= List of Beatmania video games =

This list comprises the entire Beatmania, Beatmania IIDX and Beatmania III catalog of music video games. This list does not contain beta, demo, bootlegged, or unreleased games.

This list is incomplete. If you know of a release that is not listed please add it.

== Legend ==
Flag	Country
Japan	Japanese release
South Korea	South Korean release
China	Chinese release
United States	American release
Region
European Union	European release
Asia	Asian release
North America	North American release

These lists are sorted by region of release, then platform, then best-known release date.

== Beatmania ==
	Title	Platform	Date released
Japan	Beatmania	Arcade	December 10, 1997
Japan	Beatmania 2ndMix	Arcade	March 18, 1998
Japan	Beatmania 3rdMix	Arcade	September 28, 1998
Japan	Beatmania Complete Mix	Arcade	January 19, 1999
Japan	Beatmania 4thMix the beat goes on	Arcade	April 26, 1999
Japan	Beatmania 5thMix Time to Get Down	Arcade	September 22, 1999
Japan	Beatmania Complete Mix 2	Arcade	July 27, 1999
Japan	Beatmania ClubMix	Arcade	March 28, 2000
Japan	Beatmania featuring Dreams Come True	Arcade	May 31, 2000
Japan	Beatmania Core Remix	Arcade	November 28, 2000
Japan	Beatmania 6thMix The UK Underground Music	Arcade	July 11, 2001
Japan	Beatmania 7thMix Keepin' Evolution	Arcade	January 31, 2002
Japan	Beatmania The Final	Arcade	July 26, 2002
Japan	Beatmania	Sony PlayStation	October 1, 1998
Japan	Beatmania Append 3rdMix Mini	Sony PlayStation	November 11, 1998
Japan	Beatmania Append 3rdMix	Sony PlayStation	December 23, 1998
Japan	Beatmania Append Gottamix	Sony PlayStation	May 27, 1999
Japan	Beatmania Append 4thMix	Sony PlayStation	September 9, 1999
Japan	Beatmania Append 5thMix	Sony PlayStation	March 2, 2000
Japan	Beatmania Best Hits	Sony PlayStation	July 27, 2000
Japan	Beatmania featuring Dreams Come True	Sony PlayStation	July 27, 2000
Japan	Beatmania Append Gottamix 2 Going Global	Sony PlayStation	September 7, 2000
Japan	Beatmania Append ClubMix	Sony PlayStation	December 21, 2000
Japan	Beatmania The Sound of Tokyo!	Sony PlayStation	March 29, 2001
Japan	Beatmania 6thMix + Core Remix	Sony PlayStation	January 26, 2002
Japan	Beatmania DaDaDa!	Sony PlayStation 2	March 29, 2001
Japan	Beatmania-Da!	Microsoft Windows	March 29, 2001
Japan	Beatmania GB	Nintendo Game Boy Color	March 11, 1999
Japan	Beatmania GB2 ガッチャミックス (Gotchamix)	Nintendo Game Boy Color	November 25, 1999
Japan	Beatmania GB ガッチャミックス2 (Gotchamix 2)	Nintendo Game Boy Color	September 28, 2000
Japan	Beatmania for Wonderswan	Bandai WonderSwan	April 28, 1999
Japan	Beatmania	Bemani Pocket	December 23, 1998
Japan	Bemani Pocket Skeleton	Bemani Pocket	1999
Japan	Beatmania Pocket 2	Bemani Pocket	March 25, 1999
Japan	Bemani Pocket Summer Mix	Bemani Pocket	July 29, 1999
Japan	Bemani Pocket アニソンミックス (Anime song mix)	Bemani Pocket	September 16, 1999
Japan	Bemani Pocket ときめきメモリアル (Pounding memorial)	Bemani Pocket	October 28, 1999
Japan	Bemani Pocket Enjoy Georgia Signature	Bemani Pocket	2000
Japan	Bemani Pocket アニソンミックス2 (Anime song mix 2)	Bemani Pocket	February 3, 2000
Japan	Bemani Pocket 2000	Bemani Pocket	April 20, 2000
Japan	Bemani Pocket Hello Kitty	Bemani Pocket	May 18, 2000
Japan	Bemani Pocket アニソンミックス3 (Anime song mix 3)	Bemani Pocket	June 15, 2000
Japan	Bemani Pocket 猛虎進撃 (Super tiger charge)	Bemani Pocket	July 27, 2000
Japan	Bemani Pocket Cawaii!	Bemani Pocket	August 10, 2000
Japan	Bemani Pocket ときめきメモリアル2 (Pounding memorial 2)	Bemani Pocket	December 14, 2000
Japan	Bemani Pocket Love Stories	Bemani Pocket	December 14, 2000
Japan	Bemani Pocket Konamix	Bemani Pocket	January 18, 2001
Japan	Bemani Pocket Best Hits 2000	Bemani Pocket	February 15, 2001
South Korea	Beatstage	Arcade	February 1998
South Korea	Beatstage Complete Mix	Arcade	February 1999
South Korea	Beatstage 5th Mix	Arcade	February 2000
North America	HipHopMania	Arcade	February 1998
North America	HipHopMania Complete Mix	Arcade	February 1999
North America	HipHopMania Complete Mix 2	Arcade	February 2000
European Union	Beatmania	Sony PlayStation	June 2000

== Beatmania IIDX ==
	Title	Platform	Date released
Japan	beatmania IIDX	Arcade	February 26, 1999
Japan	Beatmania IIDX Club Version	Arcade	April 21, 1999
Japan	Beatmania IIDX Substream	Arcade	July 27, 1999
Japan	Beatmania IIDX 2nd Style	Arcade	September 30, 1999
Japan	Beatmania IIDX 3rd Style	Arcade	February 25, 2000
Japan	Beatmania IIDX 4th Style	Arcade	September 28, 2000
Japan	Beatmania IIDX 5th Style	Arcade	March 27, 2001
Japan	Beatmania IIDX 6th Style	Arcade	September 28, 2001
Japan	Beatmania IIDX 7th Style	Arcade	March 27, 2002
Japan	Beatmania IIDX 8th Style	Arcade	September 27, 2002
Japan	Beatmania IIDX 9th Style	Arcade	June 25, 2003
Japan	Beatmania IIDX 10th Style	Arcade	February 18, 2004
Japan	Beatmania IIDX 11 IIDXRED	Arcade	October 28, 2004
Japan	Beatmania IIDX 12 Happy Sky	Arcade	July 13, 2005
Japan	Beatmania IIDX 13 Distorted	Arcade	March 15, 2006
Japan	Beatmania IIDX 14 Gold	Arcade	February 21, 2007
Japan	Beatmania IIDX 15 DJ Troopers	Arcade	December 19, 2007
Japan	Beatmania IIDX 16 Empress	Arcade	November 19, 2008
Japan	Beatmania IIDX 17 Sirius	Arcade	October 21, 2009
Japan	Beatmania IIDX 18 Resort Anthem	Arcade	September 14, 2010
Japan	Beatmania IIDX 19 Lincle	Arcade	September 15, 2011
Japan South Korea	Beatmania IIDX 20 Tricoro	Arcade	September 25, 2012
Japan South Korea	Beatmania IIDX 21 Spada	Arcade	November 13, 2013
Japan South Korea	Beatmania IIDX 22 Pendual	Arcade	September 17, 2014
Japan South Korea	Beatmania IIDX 23 Copula	Arcade	November 11, 2015
Japan South Korea	Beatmania IIDX 24 Sinobuz	Arcade	October 26, 2016
Japan South Korea	Beatmania IIDX 25 Cannon Ballers	Arcade	December 21, 2017
Japan South Korea	Beatmania IIDX 26 Rootage	Arcade	November 7, 2018
Japan South Korea United States	Beatmania IIDX 27 Heroic Verse	Arcade	October 2019
Japan South Korea United States	Beatmania IIDX 28 Bistrover	Arcade	October 28, 2020
Japan South Korea United States	Beatmania IIDX 29 CastHour	Arcade	October 13, 2021
Japan South Korea United States	Beatmania IIDX 30 Resident	Arcade	October 19, 2022
Japan South Korea United States	Beatmania IIDX 31 Epolis	Arcade	October 18, 2023
Japan South Korea United States	Beatmania IIDX 32 Pinky Crush	Arcade	October 2024
Japan South Korea United States	Beatmania IIDX 33 Sparkle Shower	Arcade	September 17, 2025
Japan South Korea United States	Beatmania IIDX 34 ZINRAI	Arcade	September 16, 2026
Japan	Beatmania IIDX 3rd Style	Sony PlayStation 2	November 2, 2000
Japan	Beatmania IIDX 4th Style	Sony PlayStation 2	March 29, 2001
Japan	Beatmania IIDX 5th Style	Sony PlayStation 2	August 30, 2001
Japan	Beatmania IIDX 6th Style	Sony PlayStation 2	July 18, 2002
Japan	Beatmania IIDX 7th Style	Sony PlayStation 2	March 13, 2004
Japan	Beatmania IIDX 8th Style	Sony PlayStation 2	November 18, 2004
Japan	Beatmania IIDX 9th Style	Sony PlayStation 2	March 24, 2005
Japan	Beatmania IIDX 10th Style	Sony PlayStation 2	November 17, 2005
Japan	Beatmania IIDX 11 IIDXRED	Sony PlayStation 2	May 18, 2006
Japan	Beatmania IIDX 12 Happy Sky	Sony PlayStation 2	December 14, 2006
Japan	Beatmania IIDX 13 Distorted	Sony PlayStation 2	August 30, 2007
Japan	Beatmania IIDX 14 Gold	Sony PlayStation 2	May 29, 2008
Japan	Beatmania IIDX 15 DJ Troopers	Sony PlayStation 2	December 18, 2008
Japan South Korea	Beatmania IIDX 16 Empress + Premium Best	Sony PlayStation 2	October 15, 2009
Asia	Beatmania IIDX 14 Gold	Arcade	July 2007
Asia	Beatmania IIDX 15 DJ Troopers	Arcade	June 12, 2008
South Korea	Beatstage II 2nd Style	Arcade	December 1999
China	狂热节拍IIDX	Arcade	May 30, 2011
China	Beatmania IIDX Tricoro 狂热节拍IIDX2	Arcade	September 21, 2013
North America	Beatmania	Sony PlayStation 2	February 2006
Japan	Beatmania IIDX Infinitas	PC (Konami Game Station)	December 1, 2015
Japan	Beatmania IIDX Ultimate Mobile	iOS, Android	December 9, 2019

== Beatmania III ==
	Title	Platform	Date released
Japan	Beatmania III	Arcade	March 2000
Japan	Beatmania III Append Core Remix	Arcade	December 2000
Japan	Beatmania III Append 6thMix	Arcade	July 2001
Japan	Beatmania III Append 7thMix	Arcade	January 2002
Japan	Beatmania III The Final	Arcade	July 2002

== See also ==
- List of Dance Dance Revolution games
- List of GuitarFreaks & DrumMania games
