= Beatmania IIDX 23: Copula =

23rd entry in the Beatmania IIDX rhythm game series

- Developer: Konami Digital Entertainment
- Publisher: Konami Digital Entertainment
- Series: Beatmania IIDX, Bemani
- Platform: Arcade
- Release: November 11, 2015
- Genre: Music
- Modes: Single-player & Multiplayer
- Arcade system: Konami Bemani PC (E4690)

Beatmania IIDX 23: Copula is the 23rd installment of the Beatmania IIDX series. The first location test was held at the Tokyo Leisure Land #2 location in Akihabara, Japan, from July 10 through July 12, 2015. It was released on November 11, 2015. It was the last entry in the Beatmania series made by Konami Digital Entertainment before the division was renamed Konami Amusement.

== Gameplay ==
For more information about the gameplay of Beatmania IIDX in general, please refer to Beatmania IIDX#Gameplay.

Beatmania IIDX tasks the player with performing songs through a controller consisting of seven key buttons and a scratchable turntable. Hitting the notes with strong timing increases the score and groove gauge bar, allowing the player to finish the stage. Failing to do so depletes the gauge until it is empty, abruptly ending the song.

Beatmania IIDX 23: Copula retains the core gameplay introduced in the first game in the series, and builds upon features added in subsequent versions. Notes fall from the top of a vertical track, and players are required to either press buttons or turn turntables as they reach the bottom. Copula introduces a number of new features and gameplay elements to this base, including a new "hell charge note", additional beginner note charts available in standard mode, an "Assisted Easy" difficulty mode, and various other adjustments and features.

=== Gameplay changes ===
==== Hell charge notes ====
In Beatmania IIDX 17: Sirius, "charge notes" and "backspin scratch" notes were introduced, where the player has to hold a button or continuously spin the turntable for a specified amount of time. Traditionally, these charge notes were effectively treated as a note at the start and end, with the end note being automatically treated as missed if the note is not held. In Copula, a new type of charge note, the "hell charge note" was introduced, in which the Groove Gauge meter would continuously drop or increase during the extent of the charge note, depending on whether it was correctly held. Additionally, with hell charge notes, it became possible to recover from failing to hold the note by pressing and holding after the correct start point.

==== Assisted Easy mode ====
In addition to the Easy mode available in previous versions, which reduced the rate at which the Groove Tauge drops when notes are missed, Copula added a new "Assisted Easy mode", in which the rate at which the gauge drops is the same as in Easy mode, but the threshold for clearing a chart is reduced from 80% to 60%. Charts cleared in this manner are marked as being "assist cleared".

==== Class mode changes ====
Class mode (段位認定モード) is a mode in which players select from a series of preselected 4-song courses (ranked by the difficulty level of the course). The difficulty level of the highest level course cleared is often used as an indicator of the overall strength of the player.

In Copula, several changes were made to the Class mode system. First, options were added to play a Class mode course with notes mirrored (mirror mode), with the Groove Gauge dropping faster than normal (EX mode), or both. These options were previously available in Beatmania IIDX 22: Pendual, but Mirror mode was selected based on whether the current day was "present phase" or "future phase", and EX mode required payment to be made using Konami's Paseli electronic currency; in Copula, both options are available through normal menus.

Additionally, Chūden (中伝), a new class rank, was added between classes 10th Dan (十段) and Kaiden (皆伝), while Class mode courses for dual-side play were changed from having 3 tracks to 4 tracks and began on 7th Kyū (七級) instead of 5th Kyū (五級).

==== Changes to song selection menus ====
Certain beginner charts which were previously only available in the "step-up" training mode are now available in other modes such as standard mode, under the "All Beginner" folder. Various other minor changes were made to the song select UI, including a rainbow indication for unlocked hidden tracks, and new sort options.

=== Unlocking Modes ===
==== Rainbow Tickets and Pulaco Tickets ====
Rainbow Tickets is a Paseli-Purchasable Item (similar to Pendual's Time Hourglass) which was available on November 26, 2015. The effect of this ticket would temporarily unlock any locked songs in Pendual and Copula (except for some songs), and the Leggendaria folder songs (which were otherwise only available in the Extra Stage in Paseli pay mode) for only one session of gameplay. Tickets also gave boosts to unlocks when used in any Unlocking events. Note that the Rainbow Tickets will not work on any past unlock event songs from tricoro and SPADA, as these songs are regularly unlocked. Rainbow Tickets have a validity of 60 days upon purchase. The tickets would all be sold out on October 19, 2016, and would expire on October 26, 2016.

In an update on February 3, 2016, most of the unlocks from Pendual (excluding two Floor Infectikn songs, five songs from previous unlock events (which must be unlocked on Expert mode), and all 17 Leggendaria Charts) can be unlocked by purchasing the charts (either all at once, or individually) on the Pulaco Ticket store using Pulas (the in-game currency similar to Dellars and Fricos). The Pulaco tickets function the same way as unlocking using Angel Cards from tricoro and the Sunlight Holograms from Pendual.

==== Season Line ====
Season Line is the Extra Stage system, which debuted on November 19, 2015, in which players must clear the songs through the first three stages in the game to access the songs. Each of the Season Line songs is based on a seasonal theme. Unlike the past Extra Stage Systems, there are no specific song conditions for players to play to unlock. The six Songs and their respective Season Lines were:

- Dunkel Weihnachten: nightmare before oversleep (available from November 19, 2015)
- 冬尽く小江戸 (Fuyutsuku Koedo): 麗 ～うらら～(Urara) (available from January 14, 2016)
- Spring Festival: La dolce primavera (available from March 17, 2016)
- occasional rain: 紫陽花 -AZISAI-(Ajisai -AZISAI-) (available from May 12, 2016)
- kilogramme de l'aventure: か・し・ま・し☆PUMP UP!(Ka・shi・ma・shi☆PUMP UP!) (available from August 10, 2016)
- えきねこ (Ekineko): 駅猫のワルツ(Ekineko no Waltz) (available from September 15, 2016)

The play conditions for access are made easier every Thursday. In the first week, the player can only access the Normal Chart. The second week allowed the Hyper chart to be played, and finally, the Another Chart on the third week. The total levels accumulated in the first three stages based on difficulty would also be lowered each week up to the fifth week of appearance. In addition, selecting any of the Season Line songs makes a distinctive sound when played. The sixth week further simplifies the clearing condition, with the player getting an A grade instead of AA or higher.

Initially, Season Line songs do not have One More Extra stages, just like SPADA's Leggendaria and tricoro's Limit Burst Extra Stage System. In an update starting September 15, 2016, all six of the Season Line songs could be unlocked by playing the songs once during the Extra Stage (without using Assist, Easy Gauge, Random, or Mirror modifiers), and the unlock must be done in one-player mode only (playing with a second player will prevent the song from being unlocked). A coloured emblem of the corresponding Season Line song would be displayed next to the difficulty level when it's unlocked. When the player obtains all six emblems, the player can play NZM as their One More Extra stage song under the corresponding difficulty unlocked for the six songs (a fixed set of modifiers would be automatically toggled, with the Ex-Hard gauge as enabled and Random/Mirror as disabled). The gauge used for this stage is specially designed to only decrease for missed notes and doesn't recover (a gauge identical to the beatmania's Expert Mode Gauge). If the player fails the song, the emblems will be confiscated, and the player must collect them by playing all six songs again, but the play becomes easier on subsequent attempts (such as using a simpler gauge (Hard, Default, or Easy), and allowing the gauge to recover (except in the third attempt)). Once the final boss is cleared, regardless of the type of gauge used, NZM would be unlocked for regular play.

==== Kaitsū! Tokotoko Line ====
The first major unlocking event for this game began on November 26, 2015, and ended on April 24, 2016. The objective of the event is to build a railway and its station facilities through five areas in order to unlock the songs. Building a railway requires Material Points, which can be obtained by playing songs in the game (the number of points varies in each game mode). Material Points can be boosted further depending on the partners selected, or fulfilling conditions (such as playing one song from each game version, using various items such as Rainbow Tickets, or playing certain songs in a single playthrough)

Completing the railway in an area would be a given rank promotion and allowed players to select one of the songs for unlocking (the order of the song is not specified; songs may be selected in random order). The player can revisit the area for further unlocks. Each area has one to three stations to build, and building one of them (which is indicated by the Area Happiness Gauge) would earn Pulars. Building all of the stations in the same area would unlock the console-exclusive and Revived Songs (the unlocks are pre-determined). Finally, building all 12 stations throughout five areas would also unlock Blue Spring Express and the player can proceed to the second part of the event.

The second part (which began on December 22, 2015) required players to build facilities in the same five areas, and likewise, building facilities would require filling up the Development Happiness Gauge certain times in order to unlock them. Building one facility in an area would earn Pulars; building all the facilities in the area would also unlock songs. When the player completely built all 11 facilities in all five areas, the final song 真 地獄超特急 -HELL or HELL- would also be unlocked for regular play, and the event is completed.

The event has a total of 16 songs (eight songs in each part) to unlock.

==== Expert Mode ====
The Expert Mode, in which players play four consecutive songs without stopping, was initially absent in the game's release, but was made available through an update on February 3, 2016. Similar to the past instalments, players are required to select a course of four songs and play them in order without emptying the gauge to clear the course. Most of the features of the courses (such as Internet Ranking, Customised and Random Courses) from PENDUAL were retained, including the ability to unlock songs under the Secret Course Folder.

Likewise, in order to unlock the secret songs, players are to play the respective secret course a certain number of times. The progress is shown by a gauge at the end of the gameplay, and the increase rate would depend on their performance and the modifiers used in-game. Filling the gauge would then unlock the song (and the corresponding difficulty) for normal play, even if the song has been previously unlocked.

Currently, 13 songs (including eight new songs from Copula) are available for unlocking in this mode.

==== Mystery Line ====
The second major unlocking event began on April 27, 2016. The event folder would appear between My Favourite and Level Difficulty Folders during the game's final/Extra Stage, with an on-screen alert for any new destinations available. Players may not exit the mode once the folder is opened, and switching play styles between Singles and Doubles will be temporarily disabled.

The unlocking process is split into two parts. The first part is the 'Mystery Line' folder; each destination would be chosen at random, and only one would be visited at a time. Players can also choose to redeem three Rainbow Tickets if they want to change the destination, but the player must explore the area once decided. Note that playing the song once, regardless of the difficulty selected, would be saved on the second part.

The second part is the 'Mystery Explore' folder. A pool of songs for the song's corresponding theme (with all the difficulty levels ranging from levels 1 to 12) and their charts (all four difficulties, including Beginner charts) would be selected at random. Playing a song fills up a portion of a pie chart-like gauge that would unlock the chart for normal playing, with a rate determined on the selected level and the clear type. Depending on the difficulty chosen for unlocking, more songs were required to be played and were based on the areas being explored (Normal is the plains area, Hyper is the wild area, and Another is the mystery area). Regardless of the outcome, each play would remove one star from the parking counter. When all three stars were used up, the train would move on to a new destination the next time the player enters the folder, whether the chart has been unlocked or not.

Some destinations are also marked secret and would be priorly selected over normal destinations. To access these destinations, players must further satisfy certain song conditions during the first two stages of gameplay, with some charts needing to be unlocked in advance.

There are sixteen songs that have to be unlocked in this event.

== Music ==
Currently, there are 97 new songs, including 81 all-new songs, 3 returning songs with alternate Another charts, 2 returning songs with added Hell Charge Notes, 7 songs from console versions, and 3 revived songs. A total of 23 songs from previous games have been removed.

Song	Artist	Genre	Other Information
New Regular Songs
Acid Pumper	ni-21	Hard Dance	
Aublia	onoken feat. ALIAKE	Post J-Traditional	
Damage Per Second	Maozon	Cyber Drumstep	
Devil's Gear	DJ Myosuke	Mainstream Hardcore	
DIAMOND CROSSING	S-C-U vs L.E.D.	Hard Electric Pop	System BGM.
do the thing feat. Kanae Asaba	MK	EDM	
Donkey Donk	Ryu☆	Donk	
Dreamin Train	DJ NAGAI feat. Ayumi Nomiya	J-Core Express	
Dynamite	USAO	Hybrid Twerk	
Everlasting Last	HHH×MM×ST	J-Dance Pop	
Exchange Place	Dirty Androids	Future Jersey	
GET READY!!	DJ Shimamura	Hardcore Rave	
Go Faraway	DJ Noriken feat. Yukacco	Trapstyle	
Inner Spirit	lapix	HiTech Fullon	
m1dy Dynamic	m1dy	Tokyo Style Speedcore	
Muzik LoverZ	RoughSketch	Hardstyle	
NANAIRO	LIQU@。	Metal Pops	
Nowhere	Nhato	Electro Trance	
refrain	dj TAKA feat.AiMEE	Trance	From Reflec Beat Groovin'!!.
Ride To The Core	GUHROOVY feat NO+CHIN & Yuki	J-Core	
Routing	かめりあ	Jazzy-Electro	
Set U Free feat. Kanae Asaba	Y&Co.	Hard Trance	
SHELTER OF THE MIND	YURiCa/花たん	Rockin' Drum&Bass	
STARLIGHT DANCEHALL	P*Light	Happy Emotion	
SURVIVOR	SOUND HOLIC Vs. ZYTOKINE feat. Nana Takahashi	Gravity Pop	
To The Paradise	DJ Genki feat. SHIN from HYPERNOVA	EDM	
Transport	Sota Fujimori	Tech-Trance	
Uh-Oh	kors k	Candy Rave	
Wheel of Journey	Vivian	Ethnic	
オルタネイトβ (Alternate β)	Xceon feat. Mayumi Morinaga	Hyper J-Pop	
朝焼けから始まるボクらの小さな旅 (Asayake Kara Hajimaru Bokura no Chiisana Tabi)	cosMo@暴走P	Artcore Rock	
星屑ディスタンシア (Hoshikuzu Distancia)	ARM feat. 普透明度 + Brasscapsule	Glitch Jazz	
めいさいアイドル☆あいむちゃん♪ (Meisai Idol Aimu-chan)	DJ SHARPNEL feat. みらい	電波デステクノ (Denpa Death Techno)	
セロトニン (Serotonin)	U1 overground	Orbitalictro	
灼熱 Pt.2 Long Train Running (Shakunetsu Pt.2 Long Train Running)	DJ Mass MAD Izm*	Broken Samba Break	
少女アリスと箱庭幻想コンチェルト (Shōjo Alice to Hakoniwa Gensō Concerto)	DJ TOTTO	空想ファンタジーシリーズ (Kūsō Fantasy Series)	
シュッパツシンコウ・シサカンコ (Shuppatsushinkō Shisakanko)	星野奏子	Kana-Pop	
太陽SUNSUNボンジュールアバンチュール (Taiyō SUNSUN Bonjour Adventure)	Project B-	Pieced Sunday	
追想快晴テーマパーク (Tsuisō Kaisei Theme Park)	PHQUASE	Future E-Pop	
Added Songs
Derelict Star feat. Ryu*	REMO-CON	Hard Dance	from REMO-CON's Compilation Album "DECADE 05-15 -The Greatest Works-".
Violet Pulse	G.K	Glitch Electro	from EXIT TUNES "EDP presents ravemania".
StrayedCatz	削除	Fantasy	part of NEW GENERATION Natsu no Ryüsei Festa 2016.
Triple Counter	DJ YOSHITAKA meets dj TAKA	Risk + Vacuum	part of NEW GENERATION Natsu no Ryüsei Festa 2016 (conditional unlock).
LEGGENDARIA Folder
Almagest (HCN Ver.)	Galdeira	Akashic Records	From Beatmania IIDX 17: Sirius.
Clione†	kors k	Dutch Trance	From Beatmania IIDX 4th Style.
Golden Palms†	Dirty Androids	Nu Disco	From Beatmania IIDX 18 Resort Anthem.
Kailua (HCN Ver.)	kors k	Energetic Hawaiian Trance	From Beatmania IIDX 18 Resort Anthem.
RIDE ON THE LIGHT (HI GREAT MIX)†	Mr.T	Power Fusion	From Beatmania IIDX 5th Style.
Season Line
Nightmare before oversleep	猫叉Master	Sorrow Step	Season Line- Dunkel Weihnachten.
麗 ～うらら～ (Urara)	SOUND HOLIC feat. Nana Takahashi	Winter Glow	Season Line- 冬尽く小江戸 (Fuyutsuku Koedo).
La dolce primavera	OSTER Project	Primavera Jazz Waltz	Season Line- Spring Festival.
紫陽花 -AZISAI- (Ajisai -AZISAI-)	Camellia Vs. Expander	Oriental Techdance	Season Line- occasional rain.
か・し・ま・し☆PUMP UP! (Ka・shi・ma・shi☆PUMP UP!)	miko	Summer Workout	Season Line- Kilogramme de l'aventure.
駅猫のワルツ (Ekineko no Waltz)	ミニョンヌ鉄道兄弟	にゃんコア (Nyan Core)	Season Line- えきねこ (Ekineko) based on Frédéric Chopin's Grande Valse Brillante in E-flat major.
NZM	The 4th	End Roll	Season Line- One More Extra Stage.
Expert Mode-Exclusive Unlocks
Godspeed	dj TAKA xxx 猫叉Master xxx L.E.D.	Joint Work	
Glitch Nerds	かめりあ	Gamer's Electro/Complextro	from EXIT TUNES "EDP presents ravemania".
NINJA IS DEAD IIDX ver.	P*Light	Shinobi Speed	from EXIT TUNES "EDP presents ravemania".
STARLiGHT	星龍	Dance Speed Gold	from Ryu☆'s album "Ryu☆BEST -STARLiGHT-".
Angelic Jelly	t+pazolite	Happy で Hardcore (Happy De Hardcore)	part of NEW GENERATION Natsu no Ryüsei Festa 2016.
Grand Chariot	xi	Hard Art Core	part of NEW GENERATION Natsu no Ryüsei Festa 2016.
Sephirot	SHIKI	Trance	part of NEW GENERATION Natsu no Ryüsei Festa 2016.
ZEPHYRANTHES	TAG	Bloom Core	part of NEW GENERATION Natsu no Ryüsei Festa 2016.
Otegaru!LINK TRACK
CODE:1 [revision 1.0.1]	HEXA	Techno	From Reflec Beat Volzza.
Journey	猫叉Master	World/Electronica	from Reflec Beat Volzza.
SEITEN NO TERIYAKI	Kobaryo	Chaotic Speedcore	From Reflec Beat Volzza.
Super Duper Racers	kors k & Numb'n'dub	Hardcore	From Reflec Beat Groovin'!!.
Kaitsuu! Tokotoko line
New Songs
Central Station	Recycle	Future Bass	
Rock It	Hommarju	Hardcore	
Violet Rose	OSTER Project	Latin Jazz Trio	from the album "Recursive Call".
量子の海のリントヴルム (Ryóshi no Umi no Lindwurm)	黒猫ダンジョン	エピックプログレ (Epic Progressive)	from Jubeat copious.
Blue Spring Express	DJ Scratch & Bend	Dream Core	
Arcana	Maozon	Uplifting Trance	
chaos eater -IIDX edition-	猫叉Master+	Hard Step	remastered edition from DanceDanceRevolution 2014.
Konzert V	Remo-con vs. dj TAKA	Jungle Classic	from REMO-CON's Compilation Album "DECADE 05-15 -The Greatest Works-".
On The FM	C-Show	Radio Showcase	
真 地獄超特急 -HELL or HELL- (Shin Jigoku Chōtokkyu -HELL or HELL-)	DJ TECHNORCH Vs. L.E.D.Light-G	新世紀進步的羽扇子音楽 (Shinseiki Shinpoteki Haisensu Ongaku/ New Skool Hardcore Rave)	
Revived/Console Unlocks
GOBBLE	Kimitaka Matsumae	Canterbury&Beat	from beatmania IIDX 4th Style (JP PS2).
炸裂！イェーガー電光チョップ！！ (JAEGER FINAL ATTACK) (Sakuretsu! Jaeger Denkó Chop!! (JAEGER FINAL ATTACK))	L.E.D.	Hardstyle	from beatmania IIDX 9th Style (JP PS2).
夕焼け ～Fading Day～ (Yúyake ～Fading Day～)	JAKAZiD	Aural Adrenaline	Revived Song from Beatmania IIDX 18 Resort Anthem.
Battle Train -IIDX Edition-	Sota Fujimori	Hard Dance	from beatmania IIDX 15 DJ TROOPERS (JP PS2).
Welcome	Uraken	Hardcore	from beatmania IIDX 14 GOLD (JP PS2).
SWEETEST SAVAGE	ASLETICS	Hip Hop	Revived Song from beatmania IIDX 9th Style.
Mystery Line
New Songs
AO-1	電龍	Dance Express	
GENERATE feat.綾倉盟 (GENERATE feat.Ayakura Mei)	Masayoshi Minoshima	Electronic Dance	
NO LIMIT -オレ達に限界はない- (NO LIMIT -Oretachini Genkai Wa Nai-)	SUPER STAR 満-MITSURU- vs. 伝説のダンサー マイク	Only One Dance Music	
Highcharge Divolt	HuΣeR	Bemanized Digital Rock	
明鏡止水 (Meikyōshisui)	TOMOSUKE feat. あさき	禅ジャズ (Zen Jazz)	from pop'n music 10.
M4K3 1T BOUNC3	kors k	HDM	
Outbreak	USAO	Frenchcore	
POSSESSION	TAG Underground	Psychic Flash	from Dance Dance Revolution X2.
ギョギョっと人魚♨爆婚ブライダル (Gyogyotto Ningyo♨Bakkon Bridal)	海の底からマーメイド♨Prim by ARM×狐夢想	Hi-RESORT電波 (Hi-RESORT Denpō)	
199024club -Re:BounceKiller-	DJ Mass MAD Izm*	Tech Breakbeats	
Daily Lunch Special	Lucky Vacuum	ラッキーハードコア (Lucky Hardcore)	from Reflec Beat Colette.
X	D.J.Amuro	Renaissance	
Revived/Console Unlocks
Tori-no-kimochi	猫叉Master+	World/Electronica	from Beatmania IIDX 16 EMPRESS (JP PS2).
quick master (reform version)	youhei shimizu	J-Tenko	from Beatmania IIDX 15: DJ Troopers (JP PS2). first appeared on beatmania completeMIX.
SOMETHING WONDERFUL	L.E.D.	Epic Trance	revived song from Beatmania IIDX 5th Style (JP PS2).
OUTER LIMITS ALTERNATIVE	L.E.D.-G	Hardcore	from Beatmania IIDX 13: Distorted (JP PS2).
