= Beatmania IIDX 19: Lincle =

2011 video game

- Developer: Konami
- Series: Beatmania IIDX, Bemani
- Platform: Arcade
- Release: JP: September 15, 2011
- Genre: Music
- Modes: Single-player & Multiplayer
- Arcade system: Konami Bemani PC Type 2

Beatmania IIDX 19: Lincle is the 19th game in the beatmania IIDX series of music video games. The location test itself was announced on April 18, 2011. The location test was held first on Akihabara on April 20, 2011. Umeda's location test started on April 22, 2011, and both ended on April 25, 2011. Fukuoka and Nagoya had their location test started from April 28, 2011, until May 1, 2011. Kyoto and Sapporo's location test started on May 6, 2011, until May 8, 2011. It was released on September 15, 2011.

== Gameplay ==
For more information about the gameplay of Beatmania IIDX in general, please refer to Beatmania IIDX#Gameplay.

Beatmania IIDX tasks the player with performing songs through a controller consisting of seven key buttons and a scratchable turntable. Hitting the notes with strong timing increases the score and groove gauge bar, allowing the player to finish the stage. Failing to do so depletes the gauge until it is empty, abruptly ending the song.

Beatmania IIDX 19: Lincle retains the basic gameplay, which is hitting notes that fall from the top of the screen using either keys or disc to be scratched in order to fill up the Groove Meter, which is considered passed if at the end of the stage the Groove Meter is on 80% or above. Backspin Scratch (spinning the disc from one direction and spinning it to the opposite direction on the end) and Charge Notes (holding keys until the end of the note) from Beatmania IIDX 17: Sirius also make a comeback.

=== New Features ===
In this installment, there are several features that are new in this release, the most notable being the introduction of Free Plus Mode, which is Free Mode for two players. There is also Hazard Mode which is Standard Mode with the Hazard (1 Poor or Miss will fail the stage) option being automatically on, and also Step Up Mode which replaces Story Mode from Beatmania IIDX 17: Sirius. There are also new options in the game, Ex Hard, which is a more difficult option of Hard and Sudden+ Type B, a new Sudden+, in which the lane cover height will automatically change when there is a BPM change. A customizable player avatar called Q-PRO was added.

Meanwhile, Song Previews from Dance Dance Revolution are presented in Beatmania IIDX Lincle; hovering over a song will automatically play the preview of the song before the background music is played back. There is also a new feature, Help Display. This can be accessed by holding the Vefx button to display help on the Mode Select and Music Select screens. In addition to this release, Paseli users can now purchase a new pass known as "DJ VIP Pass" that can be done before playing the first stage.

=== Unlocking System ===
==== Lincle Kingdom ====
Lincle Kingdom system had first appeared on September 28, 2011, via Standard Mode. Players can choose dungeons and were brought to the usual song selection screen. However, in-game, there would be animations of the player's Avatar in battle with monsters. Defeating them will result in earning several Dellar and experience points. Reaching some levels would unlock new songs (classified as Revivals, both from older installments or from console releases). By fulfilling certain requirements, boss songs may be played.

==== Lincle Link and APPEND TRAVEL ====
With the Lincle Link system, players are able to unlock several songs from jubeat and two new songs for both Beatmania IIDX and jubeat. Append Travel also unlocks a new song for both of them. This event also unlocked several accessories for the player's Avatar. Lincle Link Phase 5 also unlocks several songs from Reflec Beat Limelight.

==== Lincle Princess and Stamp Collection ====
This unlocking system would unlock 3 new songs, with two of them taken from the ROOTS26 Vol.5 drama CD. This event also unlocked several new Avatars and accessories for the player's Avatar.

== Music ==
beatmaniaIIDX 19: Lincle has over 60 new songs and several revivals from older installments and console releases. Hundreds of older songs also made appearances.

Song	Artist	Genre	Tier
New Regular Songs
24th Century BOY	Tatsh	Speed Rave	
A MINISTREL ~ver.short-scape~	KANTASIA by S.S.D. PRODUCTS	La Fabero	
Almace	Qrispy Joybox	Techno	
ANAGRAMS I to Y	Mayumi Morinaga	Dance Pop	
BLACK.by X-Cross Fade	DJ Mass MAD Izm*	Tech-Breakbeats	
CALL	猫叉Master	World/Electronica	
Change the World	Tatsh feat.小田ユウ	Speed Pop	
DON'T WAKE ME FROM THE DREAM (2010 Summer Edition)	YOJI	Tech Dance	Licensed song.
Drive Me Crazy	kors k feat.古川未鈴	Akiba Rave	
Electric Super Highway	MACHO ROBOT feat.nouvo nude	Electro	
ЁVOLUTIΦN	TЁЯRA	Platinum Japanesque	From the album ЁVOLUTIΦN.
EXPRESS EMOTION	REDALiCE feat.Shihori	J-Core	
F	D.J.Amuro	Renaissance	
Follow Tomorrow	HHH×MM×ST	J-Dance Pop	
GIGANT	seiya-murai	Marching Rock	
Into The Sunlight	kobo feat.RIO	Drum & Bass	
KYAMISAMA ONEGAI!	Dr.Honda feat. Moe	トレンディーポップス (Trendy Pops)	
LAX5 feat.Ryota Yoshinari	Katana Sounds	Loud Techno	
Liquid Crystal Girl feat.echo	kmp	Electro	
LOVE B.B.B.	SWAN K feat. Asuka M	Drum'n'Bass	
Lucky Days	Sota Fujimori feat. Kanako Hoshino	Dream Trance	
Mermaid Girl -秋葉工房MIX- (Mermaid Girl -Akira Koubou MIX-)	Remixed by DJ Command.	Eurobeat	
Miami Sunset Drive	Dirty Androids	80's Electro House	
Phoenix	Hommarju	Hard NRG	
prompt	w×s ft.*spiLa*	Nu Progressive	
Quick Silver	Mystic Moon	Rave Fusion	
Release the Music	kors k	Tech Dance	
Round and Round	Masayoshi Minoshima feat. 綾倉盟	Hyper Electro	
Session 12 -Esther-	PRASTIK DANCEFLOOR	Progre Synthetic	
Several Words	CAPACITY GATE	Valiant Beat	
Star Trail	Nhato	Trance	
Thunderbolt	雷龍	Ravers Dance Speed	Appeared in Beatmania IIDX 18 Resort Anthem and Reflec Beat as part of the Lincle LINK#1 event.
Voxane	Remo-con	Tech Dance	
Yellow Sunrise	xac	Drum'n'Bass	
衰色小町メランコリア (Suishoku Komachi Melancholia)	iNO	Neo Classical Dance	
蛇神 (Kagachi)	Zektbach	Oriental Mythology	From Pop'n Music 18: Sengoku Retsuden.
恋する☆宇宙戦争っ!! (Koisuru☆Uchuu Sensou!!)	Prim	Hi-Bleep	
君のハートにロックオン (Kimi no Heart ni Lock-on)	Dr.Honda	トレンディーフュージョン (Trendy Fusion)	
ユミル (Ymir)	MYTHOLOGIA by MLREC.	Symphonic-Tek	
Extra Stage
SHADE	DJ MURASAME Vs. dj Killer	Techno	Split into 3 versions (for NORMAL, HYPER, and ANOTHER charts respectively).
One More Extra Stage
DIAVOLO	度胸兄弟	Transcendental Etudes	Based on Grandes études de Paganini, Étude No. 6 (Theme and Variations).
Promotion Songs
SA.YO.NA.RA. SUPER STAR	SUPER STAR 満-MITSURU-	Only One Finale	To promote beatmania IIDX VISUAL EMOTIONS 9.
Snake Stick	DJ Yoshitaka VS. DJ MASS MAD Izm*	Tech-Breakbeats	To promote beatmania IIDX VISUAL EMOTIONS 9.
Trust -MATERIAL ver- (IIDX EDITION)	Tatsh feat. ヨーコ	Character Song	To promote Tatsh's first album MATERIAL.
Lincle Princess Event song
突撃！ガラスのニーソ姫！ (Totsugeki! Glass no Kneesock Hime!)	山本椛 (monotone)	電波 (Denpa)	
Stamp Collection Event songs
LETHEBOLG ～双神威に斬り咲けり～ (LETHEBOLG ~Futatsukamui ni Kiri Sakeri~)	TЁЯRA	Platinum J-Pop One	From the album "ЁVOLUTIΦN". To promote "Beatmania IIDX Drama CD Roots26".
RESISTANCE	セリカ	Mysterious Rock	To promote "Beatmania IIDX Drama CD Roots26".
Lincle Kingdom
Lincle Kingdom - Phase 1
CS Songs
ƒƒƒƒƒ	Five Hammer	Hard Pƒ	from Beatmania IIDX 15: DJ Troopers (PS2). first appeared on Pop'n Music 13 カーニバル.
Infinite cave	猫叉Master+	Drum 'n' bass	from Beatmania IIDX 13: Distorted (PS2).
PentaCube Gt.(RX-Ver.S.P.L.)	高田雅史	Alternative Ethno Pop	from Beatmania IIDX 14: Gold (PS2).
QUANTUM TELEPORTATION	L.E.D.	Techno	from Beatmania IIDX 13: Distorted (PS2).
子供の落書き帳 (Kodomo no rakugaki chou)	佐々木博史	Progressive	from Beatmania IIDX 15: DJ Troopers (PS2). first appeared on GuitarFreaks 6thMIX & Drummania 5thMIX.
Revivals
2 tribe 4 K	Remo con	Tribal	from Beatmania IIDX 15: DJ Troopers.
bag	Reven-G	Spiritual	from Beatmania IIDX 9th Style first appeared in Dance Dance Revolution Extreme.
desolation	Mr. T	Piano Ballad	from Beatmania IIDX 10th Style.
entrance	Kobo project with Masa	Techno	from Beatmania IIDX 5th Style (PS2).
Hormiga obrera	Shawn The Horny Master	Alternative House	from Beatmania IIDX 8th Style.
Lincle Kingdom - Phase 1 Boss
The Sampling Paradise	Mamonis	Hard Trance	represents Greed. name is a variation on Mammon.
Scharfricter	Ashemu	Hard Rock	represents Lust name is a variation on Asmodeus.
In The Blackest Den	Bulluvegola	Progressive Rock	represents Sloth. name is a variation on Belphegor.
聖人の塔 (Seijin no Tou)	Beridzebeth	Battle Track	represents Gluttony. name is a variation on Beelzebub.
Lincle Kingdom - Phase 2 Event
Lincle Kingdom - Phase 2 Boss
Todestrieb	Rche	Sacred Trance	represents Pride. name is a variation on Lucifer.
NNRT	Levaslater	Electro Gothic	represents Envy. name is a variation on Leviathan.
The Limbo	STN	Cyber Punk	represents Wrath. name is a variation on Satan.
YAKSHA	Neulakyussra	Terror Core	represents Judgement. name is a variation on Narakasura.
Lincle Kingdom One More Extra Stage
天空の夜明け (Tenkuu no Yoake)	Cuvelia	Anthem	The Last Guardian represents Rebirth. name is a variation on Cybele.
APPEND TRAVEL unlock
532 nm	Ryu☆	Hardcore	beatmania IIDX 19: Lincle x jubeat copious APPEND.
Lincle LINK
Lincle LINK#2 Event songs
Far east nightbird	猫叉Master	Drum'n'Bass	Lincle x jubeat copious From jubeat knit.
I'm so Happy	Ryu☆	Happy Hardcore	Lincle x jubeat copious From jubeat knit.
Snow Goose	Mutsuhiko Izumi	Electric Pomp	Lincle x jubeat copious From jubeat.
陽炎 (Kagerou)	星野奏子	Pop	Lincle x jubeat copious
Lincle LINK#3 Event songs
WONDER WALKER	L.E.D.	Hard Trance	Lincle x jubeat copious
yellow head joe	S-C-U	Tek-Trance	Lincle x jubeat copious
Lincle LINK#5 Event songs
ビューティフル レシート (Beautiful Receipt)	Lucky Vacuum	Happy Hardcore	Lincle x REFLEC BEAT limelight From REFLEC BEAT limelight / Dance Dance Revolution X3 vs 2ndMix.
Flip Flap	kors k	Candy Handz Up	Lincle x REFLEC BEAT limelight From REFLEC BEAT limelight.
Castle on the Moon	青龍	Dance Speed	Lincle x REFLEC BEAT limelight From REFLEC BEAT limelight.
TITANS RETURN	L.E.D.	Drumstep	Lincle x REFLEC BEAT limelight From REFLEC BEAT limelight.
quaver♪	Risk Junk	Happy	Lincle x REFLEC BEAT limelight From REFLEC BEAT limelight.
HAERETICUS	D.J.Amuro Vs MAX MAXIMIZER	Eccentric	Lincle x REFLEC BEAT limelight
