= Beatmania IIDX (video game) =

1999 music video game

- The title screen
- Developer: Bemani
- Publisher: Konami
- Series: Beatmania IIDX
- Platform: Arcade
- Release: JP: February 26, 1999
- Genre: Music
- Modes: Single-player, multiplayer
- Arcade system: Bemani Twinkle

Beatmania IIDX (Note: Japanese: ビートマニア ツーディーエックス, Hepburn: Bītomania Tsū Di Ekkusu) (stylized as beatmaniaIIDX) is an arcade music video game developed by Bemani and published by Konami. It was released in Japan on February 26, 1999. The objective is to perform songs using a controller with seven keys and a turntable. After the surprise success of Beatmania, Benami conceived IIDX to simulate an actual disc jockey (DJ) live performance. Its arcade cabinet contains a widescreen monitor, speakers, and eight spotlights. Bemani later developed several updated versions of IIDX to increased success. The game retrospectively received a positive reception from video game publications for its gameplay and increased difficulty. A sequel, Beatmania III, was released in 2000.

== Gameplay ==
The player hits notes during the M-Flo song "The Theme from Flo Jack".

The objective of Beatmania IIDX is to perform songs using a controller with seven key buttons and a scratchable turntable. Hitting notes with accurate timing increases the player's score and groove gauge bar, allowing the player to finish the stage. Failing to do so depletes the gauge and can prematurely end the song. IIDX has four play modes: 4 Keys, 5 Keys, 7 Keys, and Expert. The controls in the 4 Keys mode are limited to only the white buttons. 5 Keys is a mode where the player uses "3 white keys on bottom and 2 black keys on top" like in Beatmania. The 7 Keys mode utilizes all buttons and Expert has the player select a course and obtain the highest score. Clearing four or more stages in Internet Ranking results in a password, which can be submitted to Konami so that the player's score is registered and shown in worldwide rankings.

== Development and release ==
In 1997, Konami distributed its Games & Music Division's (G.M.D.) Beatmania in Japan as an arcade DJ simulator, significantly influencing rhythm games. Its surprise success prompted the developer to rename itself Bemani, a portmanteau of the game's title. The studio made more music-themed video games following its release, including Pop'n Music and Dance Dance Revolution. Bemani conceived Beatmania IIDX as a sequel to Beatmania. It was designed to simulate the experience of a DJ performing songs live at a music venue which gave it a "club Visual Jockey feel." The game was released on February 26, 1999. While its predecessor used five keys, the IIDX controller had seven. The controller was one of components used in the game's Benami Twinkle cabinet, along with a large 40-inch widescreen monitor, large speakers, eight spotlights, and the Effect Fader (located in the control panel); the last of which is used to alter the sound during gameplay.

== Reception and legacy ==
Neil Foster of Hardcore Gaming 101 noticed that player one's controller had the turntable relocated to the left side, which was advantageous to "some players." He commented that with the addition of a widescreen monitor, the black keys were given easily identifiable lanes. He called the game "a rocky start" for the Beatmania IIDX series, since it had music from Beatmania's first two iterations (1st Mix and 2nd Mix) paired with new songs and remixes. According to Foster, many players were initially not impressed with performing old songs on upgraded hardware, so they switched to Beatmania 4th Mix.

Bemani developed several sequels to the game after its release. Konami decided to link Beatmania IIDX Club Version (later Substream) cabinets with Dance Dance Revolution 2ndMix machines for simultaneous play, leading to increased success. In late 1999, the publisher hired artist Goli to design graphics and characters for Beatmania IIDX 2nd Style. Featuring a new visual theme, 3rd Style was ported to the PlayStation 2. In 2002, 8th Style was released after the discontinuation of the original Beatmania. Foster stated these popularized IIDX to the point where it overshadowed its predecessor, as the game not only earned more new songs, but became very difficult. A sequel with a five-key controller, Beatmania III, was released in 2000.

== Notes and references ==
=== Bibliography ===
- Ashcraft, Brian; Snow, Jean (2008). Arcade Mania! The Turbo-Charged World of Japan's Games Centers. Kodansha International. ISBN 978-4-7700-3078-8.
- Cook, Nicholas; Pettengill, Richard (May 16, 2013). Taking It to the Bridge: Music as Performance. University of Michigan Press. ISBN 9780472051779.
