= Beatmania IIDX 18 Resort Anthem =

2010 video game

- Developer: Konami
- Publisher: Konami
- Series: Beatmania IIDX, Bemani
- Platform: Arcade
- Release: JP: September 15, 2010
- Genre: Music
- Modes: Single-player & Multiplayer
- Arcade system: Konami Bemani PC Type 2

Beatmania IIDX 18 Resort Anthem is a music video game in the Beatmania IIDX series of games by Konami. On April 19, 2010, Bemani fansite Zenius -I- Vanisher reported that Konami had announced the first location test for the newest game in the IIDX series. The location test ran from April 22 to April 26 at the Cat's Eye Machida (キャッツアイ町田) in Machida, Tokyo. Follow-up location tests ran in Chōfu, Tokyo and Kyoto from April 30 to May 6, in Nagoya and Sapporo from May 14 to May 20 and in Chiyoda, Tokyo from June 11 to June 12. The game was released on September 15, 2010, This Beatmania iteration's theme focuses heavily on a futuresque modern relaxation and tropical beach resort concert-like setting, with the interface making use of sleek mechanical components with simple whites and bright colors that are easy on the eyes.

== Gameplay ==
Beatmania IIDX tasks the player with performing songs through a controller consisting of seven key buttons and a scratchable turntable. Hitting the notes with strong timing increases the score and groove gauge bar, allowing the player to finish the stage. Failing to do so depletes the gauge until it is empty, abruptly ending the song.

There are some changes made for this series. The song wheel is now circular rather than vertical, similar to the one in Dance Dance Revolution. 2 new modes are presented; Premium Free Mode, a mode where the player plays for 8 minutes as opposed to 2 stages, and DJ Order Mode, a mode which is similar to Pop'n Music's Challenge Mode, where a player can select missions (similar to pop'n's Normas) and earn DELLAR POINTS. Other than that, all of the gameplay remains the same.

=== Unlocking System ===
Resort Anthem only has one Extra Stage, making it the first to do this since Beatmania IIDX 12: Happy Sky. However, players can get new songs through Beat Unlocks, JAPAN TOUR, WORLD TOUR and other unlockable events.

==== Append festival ====
With the announcement of APPEND FESTIVAL, a new crossover from jubeat series was unlocked on March 11, 2011, and another crossover from jubeat knit APPEND was unlocked on March 23, 2011. This unlocking system needs an e-Amusement card.

==== Lincle LINK ====
KONAMI announced the Lincle LINK event on June 30, 2011. This event would start in the middle of July, linking Resort Anthem and REFLEC BEAT together through song unlocking. Again, this event needed an e-Amusement card.

== Music ==
Beatmania IIDX 18 Resort Anthem feature 74 new songs as well as 567 songs from previous releases for a total of 641 songs. A total of 21 songs had been removed from this game.

Song	Artist	Genre	Tier
New Regular Songs
Aegis	IT medalion	Techno	
Answer	星野奏子	Star Pop	
Believe In Me	Uraken feat. Calyn Tsukishima	Hardcore	
BLUST OF WIND	Anemo=Aspel by MLREC.	Crossover House	
Bounce Bounce Bounce	kors k feat. Kanata Okajima&楽天斎	Dancehall	
BROKEN EDEN	MYTHILOGIA by MLREC.	Symphonic-Tek	
Cansei de S NIK	PRASTIK DANCEFLOOR	Fidget house	
Destiny Sword	CAPACITY GATE	Electric Step	
DAYDREAMER	ピンクターボ	Girly Rock	
Energy Drive	kevin energy	Hardcore	
EXTREMA PT.2	Remo-con	Tech Dance	
Fantasia	TЁЯRA	Hyper Fantasia	From pop'n music 17: THE MOVIE.
Get Out	壱岐尾彩花	Electro	Licensed song.
Golden Palms	Dirty Androids	Nu Disco	
I FIGHT ME	kobo feat. Marsha	Drum&Bass	
かげぬい ～Ver.Benibotan～ (Kagenui ~Ver.Benibotan~)	CULTVOICE by S.S.D.PRODUCTS	Natsu Matsuri	
La Mar	seiya-murai feat.David Solanes Venzala	Catalā Lounge	
Mermaid girl	Cream puff	Bubblegum Dance	
Never Fade Away	Sota Fujimori feat.dj MAX STEROID	IIDX Handz Up!!	
New Castle Legions	Dirty Androids	Dystopia	
おおきなこえで (Ookinakoede)	猫叉Master feat. Sana	World/Pop	
passionate fate	Ryu☆	Handz Up	
Programmed Life	kors k	Psy Trance (Full On)	
Programmed Sun (xac Antarctic Ocean mix)	Remixed by xac.	Uplifting Trance	
ラクエン Feat.Chiharu Chonan -JAKA respect for K.S.K. Remix (Rakuen Feat.Chiharu Chonan -JAKA respect for K.S.K. Remix)	Remixed by JAKAZiD.	Techy Freeform	
"恋愛レボリューション21 -秋葉工房mix-" (Ren'ai Revolution 21 -Akiba Koubou mix-)	DJ Command feat. うさ&ともみん	Eurobeat	Cover of the 11th single performed by Morning Musume.
reunion	Tatsh	Cyber Waltz	
Rock Da House	M-Project fw.GUHROOVY	UK Hardcore	
Session 9 -Chronicles-	PRASTIK DANCEFLOOR	Rockin'Drum'n'Bass	
Space Time	NISH	Energetic Trance	
Stay my side	DJ Yoshitaka feat.RINA	R&B	From Reflec Beat.
Take Me Higher	Sota Fujimori feat. Sachi	Synthetic Electro	Theme song for Road Fighters.
THE DOOR INTO RAINBOW	L.E.D.	Trance	
Tropical April	Risk Junk	Vacation Dance	
Vermillion	Mystic Moon	Psyche Fusion	Ending song for IIDX SIRIUS.
Watch Out Pt.2	DJ Mass MAD Izm* vs. DJ Yoshitaka	Tech-Breakbeats	
WISE UP!	木之下慶行 feat.星野奏子	Resort House	
XANADU OF TWO	T.Kakuta With Starving Trancer + 森永真由美	Dance-pop	
You Were the One	good-cool ft. Brenda Vaughn	Italo House	
夕焼け ～Fading Day～ (Yuuyake ~Fading Day~)	JAKAZiD	Aural Adrenaline	
ZETA ～素数の世界と超越者～ (ZETA ~Sosuu no Sekai to Chouetsusha~)	Zektbach	IDM	From pop'n music 15: ADVENTURE.
Extra Stage
ANTHEM LANDING	DJムラサメ	Latin Tek	Split into 3 versions (for NORMAL, HYPER, and ANOTHER charts respectively).
One More Extra Stage
灼熱Beach Side Bunny (Shakunetsu Beach Side Bunny)	DJ Mass MAD Izm*	Broken Samba Break	
beat#2 Unlocks
SABER WING	TAG	Shooting Waltz	From Dance Dance Revolution X.
sakura storm	Ryu☆	Happy Hardcore	From Dance Dance Revolution Universe 3.
旅人リラン (Tabibito Re-Run / The Flying Rerun)	XOGO BRYKK	Eleclore	
beat#3 Unlocks
ALBIDA	DJ YOSHITAKA	Hard Renaissance	From jubeat ripples APPEND.
Everlasting Resort	SUPER STAR 満 -MITSURU-	Only One Anthem	Ending song (Credits screen).
黒髪乱れし修羅となりて (Kurokami Midareshi Shura to Narite)	村正クオリア	撫子メタル (Nadeshiko Metal)	From pop'n music 18: Sengoku Retsuden.
JAPAN TOUR
New Songs
DM STAR ～関西 energy style～ (DM STAR ~Kansai energy style~)	NAOKI	Speed Rave	Original version is a theme song of Dance Evolution.
Raise your hands	Keichii Ueno feat. RIISA	Okinawa Anthem	
WE LOVE SHONAN	Studio Bongo Mango feat. Likkle Mai	Surf & Dub	
ELECTRIC MASSIVE DIVER	L.E.D.-G	Gabba	
Dances with Snow Fairies	Dr.Honda	トレンディートランス (Trendy Trance)	
Revival Unlocks
ヒマワリ (Himawari)	小坂りゆ	J-Happy Hardcore	First appeared in Happy Sky. (From Guitar Freaks 10th MIX & Drum Mania 9th MIX).
LOVE♥SHINE	小坂りゆ	J-Happy Hardcore	First appeared on 9th Style. (From Dance Dance Revolution Extreme).
真夏の花・真夏の夢 (Manatsu No Hana, Manatsu No Yume)	Sana	House	First appeared on 9th Style. Revived with Charge Notes added to the Another chart.
Pink Rose	Kiyommy+Seiya	Heart	First appeared on Happy Sky. (From Keyboardmania 3rd MIX). Revived with Another chart changed with the one containing Charge Notes.
Under the Sky	南さやか (BeForU) with platoniX	J-Eurotrance	First appeared in Happy Sky.
WORLD TOUR
Breaking the ground	Art of Fighters	Hardcore	
LIFE SCROLLING	HIROSHI WATANABE	Detroit Techno	
Hardcore Mania	DJ Weaver	Hardcore	
Kailua	kors k	Energetic Hawaiian Trance	
THE BLACK KNIGHT	L.E.D.	Goa Trance	
Let The Track Flow	Brisk & Ham	UK Hardcore	
PARADISE LOST	Ryu☆ Vs. L.E.D.-G	Trance Core	
perditus┼paradisus	iconoclasm	Anthem Core	
Story Mode Unlocks
Eternal Tears	ツガル	Winter Ballade	
Medicine of love	イロハ & リリナ	Magical Pop	
APPEND FESTIVAL Unlocks
Love♥km	dj TAKA feat. REN	Happy Core	From jubeat knit. Unlocked on March 11, 2011.
STELLAR WIND	L.E.D.	Hard Dance	APPEND FESTIVAL unlock (started on March 23, 2011).
Lincle Link Unlocks
Broken	DJ TAKA feat. AiMEE	Trance	From REFLEC BEAT.
中華急行 (Chuka Kyuko)	Ryu☆	Happy Hardcore	Preview song from REFLEC BEAT limelight.
Sakura Reflection	Ryu☆	Happy Hardcore	From REFLEC BEAT.
SPECIAL SUMMER CAMPAIGN!	Lucky Vacuum	Buchiage Trance	From REFLEC BEAT.
Survival Games	VENUS	90's electropop	From REFLEC BEAT.
THE FALLEN	L.E.D.-G	Goth Nu-Style Gabba	From REFLEC BEAT.
Thunderbolt	雷龍	Ravers Dance Speed	Preview song from Beatmania IIDX 19: Lincle.
Wuv U	kors k	Candy Rave	From REFLEC BEAT.
