= Beatmania IIDX 3rd Style =

2000 video game

- PlayStation 2 cover art
- Developer: Bemani
- Publisher: Konami
- Series: Beatmania IIDX
- Platforms: Arcade & Sony PlayStation 2
- Release: Arcade: JP: February 25th, 2000; PlayStation 2: JP: November 2nd, 2000
- Genre: Music
- Modes: Single-player & Multiplayer
- Arcade system: Bemani Twinkle

beatmania IIDX 3rd Style is a music video game developed by Bemani and published by Konami, initially released as an arcade game in Japan on February 25, 2000, and subsequently ported to the PlayStation 2 on November 2. 3rd Style removed the 4-keys mode from previous installments and replaced it with the Light7 difficulty, giving most songs a fully separate, easier notechart. The game also introduced Free Mode and Extra Stage, and featured a new aesthetic.

== Gameplay ==
Beatmania IIDX tasks the player with performing songs through a controller consisting of seven key buttons and a scratchable turntable. Hitting the notes with strong timing increases the score and groove gauge bar, allowing the player to finish the stage. Failing to do so depletes the gauge until it is empty, abruptly ending the song. 3rd Style removed the 4-keys mode from previous installments and replaced it with the Light7 difficulty, giving most songs a fully separate, easier notechart. The game also introduced Free Mode and Extra Stage, and featured a new rave-themed aesthetic.

== Development and release ==
Bemani developed several updates to Beatmania IIDX after its release. Konami decided to link Beatmania IIDX Club Version (later Substream) cabinets with Dance Dance Revolution 2ndMix machines for simultaneous play, leading to increased success. In late 1999, the publisher hired artist Goli to design graphics and characters for Beatmania IIDX 2nd Style. Featuring a new visual theme and song selection influenced by electronic music and rave music, 3rd Style was released as an arcade title on February 25, 2000.

== Home version ==
3rd Style was the first Beatmania game to receive a PlayStation 2 port, which was published on November 2. This version includes various songs from the first three styles, though some remain arcade-exclusive.
