= Beatmania IIDX 16: Empress =

2008 video game

- Artwork for the PlayStation 2 release which includes the Premium Best disc with the game.
- Developer: Konami Digital Entertainment
- Publisher: Konami Digital Entertainment
- Series: Beatmania IIDX, Bemani
- Platforms: Arcade, PlayStation 2
- Release: Arcade: JP: November 19, 2008; PlayStation 2: JP/SK: October 15, 2009
- Genre: Music
- Modes: Single-player & Multiplayer
- Arcade system: Konami Bemani PC Type 2

Beatmania IIDX 16: Empress is the 16th game in the Beatmania IIDX series of music video games. It was released in arcades by Konami on November 19, 2008 (11 months since the arcade release of Beatmania IIDX 15: DJ Troopers). The game features over 50 new songs, some of which are unlocked over Konami's e-Amusement platform. The design of Empress's interface is based on a pink color scheme, dominated by sparkles, butterfly wings, and motifs of royalty and jewellery. A PlayStation 2 port for the game was released on October 15, 2009, in Japan.

== Gameplay ==
Beatmania IIDX tasks the player with performing songs through a controller consisting of seven key buttons and a scratchable turntable. Hitting the notes with strong timing increases the score and groove gauge bar, allowing the player to finish the stage. Failing to do so depletes the gauge until it is empty, abruptly ending the song.

The core gameplay remains the same in Empress. A new hidden modifier called "ALL-SCRATCH" changes most of the notes into scratches. More tutorials have been added to the Tutorial mode from DJ Troopers. Many sound effects in the user interface have also been changed. A new mode that is introduced before DJ Troopers CS, "Hazard Mode", instantly fails the player if a combo is broken many times (effectively requiring a full combo in order to pass the stage). To access this mode, All the black buttons must be pushed (when highlighting Free mode in mode selection) to activate the Hazard mode.

The upgrade to Empress also comes with a new turntable design, which has been built to be easier to trigger, and also features a more textured surface.

== e-Amusement ==
More advanced statistics can be accessed through e-Amusement's online components. Jewels can be collected for the Empress Place system using e-Amusement.

=== Empress Place ===
Empress Place is the Extra Stage system used by Empress. During regular play, players randomly accumulate colored jewels (the algorithm has not been disclosed). These jewels are used to unlock the 3 songs, each song representing a famous empress. The 3 songs are Kung-fu Empire by 飛燕流舞 (Consort Yang Yuhuan), Arabian Rave Night by dj MAX STEROID (Cleopatra), and Marie Antoinette by Marguerite du Pre {Marie Antoinette}. When all songs have been cleared with an AAA rating using te HARD option and the player is playing on ANOTHER, then the player would have the opportunity to play the One More Extra Stage, 卑弥呼 by 朱雀 VS 玄武 {Himiko}.

== Music ==
=== New songs ===
Genre	Song	Artist	Tier
Hardcore	"ALL I NEED YOUR LOVE"	GUHROOVY fw. M-Project	
Only One Eurobeat	"ALL MY TURN -このターンに、オレの全てを賭ける-"	SUPER STAR 満-MITSURU-	
Dragon'Bass	"アタック NO.3" (Attack No.3)	IDEA NOTE	
Reckless Rave	"B4U (BEMANI FOR YOU MIX)"	Remixed by DJ YOSHITAKA with Michael a la mode.	
House	"Bahram Attack -猫又Master Remix-"	猫又Master feat. JUNE	
Happy☆Jig	"BRIDAL FESTIVAL !!!"	S.S.D. with ななっち	
Nostalish Requiem	"CaptivAte2 ～覚醒～"	e-lma	
Buchiage Trance	"Cyber Force -DJ Yoshitaka Remix-"	Remixed by DJ YOSHITAKA.	
Mega Mix	"Flash Back 90's"	kors k as Disconation	
Dream Trance	"Fly Above"	Sōta Fujimori	
Trance Core	"Go Beyond!!"	Ryu☆ Vs. Sota	From DistorteD (CS).
House	"HOUSE NATION" (HOUSE NATION feat. LISA)	ravex	House Nation licensed song.
Nu School Breaks	"Just a Little Smile"	Sōta Fujimori	From Happy Sky (CS).
Hou-Rock	"ハリツヤランデヴー" (Haritsuya Rendez-vous)	Des-MASTERS	
Morning Full On	"HYPERION"	L.E.D.	
Techno Pop	"I'm Screaming LOVE"	Creative Life	
Mixture	"Jack"	DesQ	From Pop'n Music 10.
Hardcore	"JEWELLERY STORM"	L.E.D.-G fw. Eriko Tanzawa	
J-Dance Pop	"まほろば" (Mahoroba)	HHH+H	
Trendy Techno	"ミッドナイト堕天使" (Midnight Datenshi)	Dr. Honda	
Electro-Tech	"Mind Mapping"	Ryu☆	
Eurobeat	"Monkey Dance '09"	Y&Co. Feat. DOMINO	
Trance	"MY FUTURE"	PINK PONG	
Tech-Breakbeats	"naughty girl@Queen's Palace"	DJ Mass MAD Izm*	
Energetic Trance	"neogenesis"	DM Ashura	
Dance Music of Sorrow	"NΦ CRIME" ^{*1}	C×F (Music Produced by NAOKI MAEDA)	
House	"Our Song" (Our Song (HOUSE NATION Edit))	Shinichi Osawa	House Nation licensed song.
Psychedelic trance	"PSYCHE PLANET-GT"	Remixed by L.E.D.	
E-Dance Pop	"Punch Love ♥ 仮面"	上野圭市(a.k.a. Baby Weapon, DJ SWAMI) feat. 星野奏子	
Big beat	"Queen's Tragedy"	猫又Master+	
撫子ロック (Nadeshiko Rock)	"凛として咲く花の如く" (Rin to Shite Saku Hana no Gotoku) ^{*2}	紅色リトマス	From Pop'n Music 15: Adventure.
Tech-Para	"Secrets"	good-cool ft. CHiCO	
Candy Rave	"smooooch ･∀･"	kors k	
Techno	"SOLITON BEAM"	L.E.D.	From IIDX RED (CS).
Rage Against Empress	"天空脳番長危機十六連打 " (Tenkuu Nou Banchou Kiki Juuroku Renda)	D.J.SETUP	
Iron Concerto	"鉄甲乙女 -under the steel-" (Tekkou Otome -under the steel-)	Seiya Murai	
Only One Epilogue	"THANK YOU FOR PLAYING"	SUPER STAR 満-MITSURU-	Ending Theme (credits BGA).
UK Hardcore	"THE SHINING POLARIS (kors k mix)"	Remixed by kors k.	
House	"thunder HOUSE NATION Remix"	Remixed by Sunset In Ibiza (SII).	Collaborated with "House Nation".
J-Trance	"翼" (Tsubasa)	小林ゆう	
Elemental Chant	"Turii -Panta rhei-"	Zektbach	
Progressive	"V2"	TAKA	
90's Rave	"Y&Co. is dead or alive"	Y&Co.	
ポップス (Pops)	"山岡晃の「クイズ！家事都合！」" (Yamaoka Akira no Quiz! Kajitsugou! / Akira Yamaoka)	AKIRA YAMAOKA feat. 喜屋武ちあき	
Only One Techno	"You'll say "Now!""	BLACK STAR 幸広-YUKIHIRO-	
Psy Trance (Full On)	"Programmed World"	kors k as StripE	Extra (ES).
Dance Speed	"3y3s"	青龍 (Seiryuu)	One More Extra.
Jumpstyle	"BITTER CHOCOLATE STRIKER"	L.E.D.-G	Extra (OMES).
Happy Hardcore	"Colorful Cookie"	Lucky Vacuum	Extra (OMES).
Hardcore	"不沈艦CANDY" (Fuchinkan Candy)	Risk Junk	Extra (OMES).
Asian Jangle	"Kung-fu Empire"	飛燕流舞(猫叉Master)	EP.
Arabic Hardcore	"Arabian Rave Night"	dj MAX STEROID(Sota Fujimori)	EP.
宮廷円舞曲 (Court Waltz)	"Marie Antoinette"	Marguerite du Prê	EP
Esoteric Speedcore	"卑弥呼" (Himiko)	朱雀 (Suzaku) VS 玄武 (Genbu)	EP OMES.

Regular Song	Unlock	From CS	Extra Stage	Empress Place

*1 NΦ CRIME had 2 versions in Empress.
*2 was originally only playable in Beginner mode. A patch over e-Amusement unlocked it for regular play.

== Home version ==
The home version was released on October 15, 2009. Unlike previous home versions, the home version of Beatmania IIDX 16: Empress contains two discs. The first one is the EMPRESS disc, which contains songs from the arcade version, home version-originals, and some revivals. The second, called PREMIUM BEST disc, contains the rest of the revivals which were selected from the whole Beatmania IIDX series games. Each disc contains 99 songs, adding the total to 198 songs. It was the final version of Beatmania IIDX to be released on the PlayStation 2.

=== CS-exclusive songs ===
Genre	Song	Artist	Tier
Trance	"Back Into The Light -Feelings Won't Fade Vocal Mix-"	Sota Fujimori	
Electro	"Electrogasm"	Sota Fujimori	
Hardcore	"ERaSeR EnGinE DistorteD"	L.E.D.-G VS GUHROOVY	
Tech House	"From Time To Time"	sanodg	
Drum'n'Bass	"FLAG OF PEACE"	GUHROOVY fw. NO+CHIN	
BOSSA ELECTRO	"Gymnopedie 009"	Studio Bongo Mango feat. Junko Wada	
Happy Hardcore	"RIZING YOU UP"	Ryu*	
乙女ハウス (Maiden House)	"Sunshine Hero"	Kors K feat. Mari*Co.	
Progressive	"たまゆら"	佐々木博史	From Guitar Freaks 8th Mix / DrumMania 7th Mix.
Trance	"Time to Empress"	dj TAKA feat. wac & secret K	
WORLD/ELECTRONICA	"Tori-no-kimochi"	猫叉Master+	
New Age	"ToyCube Pf.(RX-Ver.S.P.L.)"	高田雅史	
Drum'n'Bass	"Troposphere"	kobo	
Breakbeats Trance	"Unicorn tail"	DJ YOSHITAKA	

== Removals and revivals ==
35 songs were removed in total from Empress. Major removals include the remaining songs by Reo Nagumo, BeForU, and BeForU's members. Nagumo had left Konami in 2006, and BeForU had also recently signed into a new recording contract with Avex Group in the same year, officially severing their ties with Konami. However, their first single under Avex, Red Rocket Rising - which was also removed, appeared in Gold. Other removals include the DJ Yoshitaka remix of I'm In Love Again, which also would not appear in the console version of DJ Troopers. No reasons have been given for the removals.

On the contrary, many songs by Takehiko "Slake" Fujii have been revived. Make A Difference from Beatmania IIDX 9th Style had also been revived, and it had received new Hyper and Another charts. SOLITON BEAM had also received new charts.
