= Beatmania (European video game) =

2000 video game

- Cover art
- Developer: Konami
- Publisher: Konami
- Platform: PlayStation
- Release: EU: June 2000
- Genre: Music game
- Modes: Single-player, multiplayer

beatmania, referred as beatmania European Edit in the game's credits, is a music game for the PlayStation by Konami. It was released in the European market in 2000 and was sold in combination with the beatmania Controller. It featured seven tracks that weren't included in the Japanese version, for example "Dreaming" by Ruff Driverz and "Sing it Back" by Moloko.

== Controller ==
The beatmania Controller for PlayStation by Konami (Sony ID: SLEH-00021, Konami product no. RU024) is used with the music video game beatmania. It features a keyboard with five keys and a turntable-like platter. The controller and game disc were also sold as a bundle.

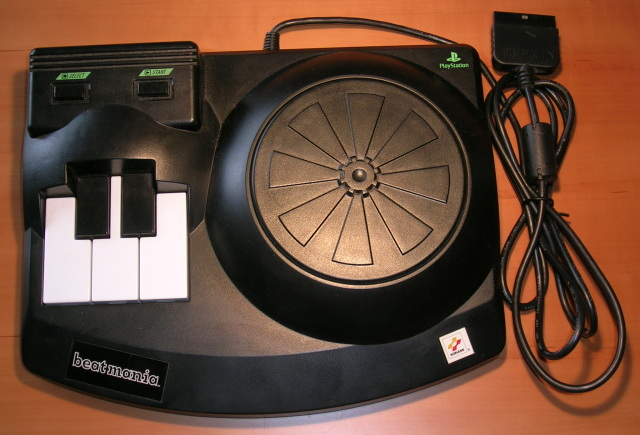
Beatmania Controller for PlayStation
