= Beatmania IIDX 27: Heroic Verse =

Konami rhythm arcade game

Beatmania IIDX 27 HEROIC VERSE
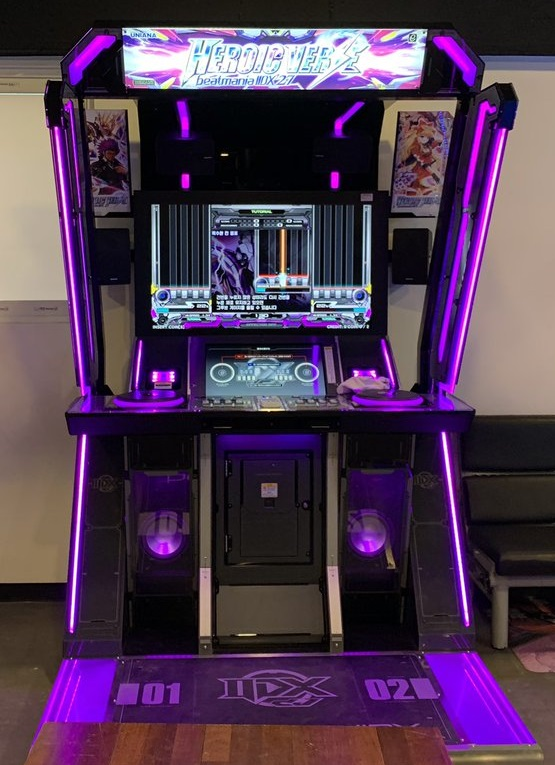
- The Lightning Model cabinet of Beatmania IIDX 27
- Developer: Konami Digital Entertainment
- Publisher: Konami Digital Entertainment
- Series: Beatmania IIDX, Bemani
- Platform: Arcade
- Release: October 16, 2019
- Genre: Music
- Modes: Single-player, multiplayer
- Arcade system: Intel Core i5 9400F

Beatmania IIDX 27: Heroic Verse is the 27th installment of the Beatmania IIDX series. It takes on the theme of superheroes within a rhythm game multiverse, and was the first arcade game in its series to have an official release in North America.

== Release ==
The first location test of Heroic Verse was held at the Game Silk Hat location in Kawasaki, Japan from July 12 through July 15, 2019, with a follow-up location test from August 8 to August 11, 2019, at Comtech Tower, Aichi, Nagoya, Japan. It was released on October 16, 2019, through an online update, and upgraded "lightning model" (LM) cabinets were distributed in the following months. The introduction of the alternative LM cabinet marked the first major redesign of the arcade cabinet since the series' introduction; the distribution of these cabinets also marked the first time a Beatmania IIDX arcade game was released with an official North American version.

== Gameplay ==
Beatmania IIDX tasks the player with performing songs through a controller consisting of seven key buttons and a scratchable turntable. Hitting the notes with strong timing increases the score and groove gauge bar, allowing the player to finish the stage. Failing to do so depletes the gauge until it is empty, abruptly ending the song.

=== Notable changes from previous releases ===
In addition to the standard 3 difficulties available for each song, beginner and leggendaria difficulty settings are available for selection in the standard song wheel on songs that have charts in those difficulties.

A feature called NOTES RADAR has been added to indicate the parameters of a particular song, such as density of scratch or charge (hold) notes or severity of BPM changes. This feature is similar to the groove radar system introduced in DDRMAX Dance Dance Revolution 6thMix.

==== Lightning model exclusive ====
Eisei dan (永世段位) courses are available only on LM cabinets; they function similar to previous dan courses as a challenge to determine one's overall skill level, with additional restrictions. To complete an eisei dan course, the corresponding dan course must be completed 5 times in a row. Failing any one time resets the player's progress, and the groove gauge is limited on each consecutive attempt to the lowest value it dropped to on the previous completed course. Clearing an eisei dan course imparts a golden glow to the player's ranking.

Three additional hidden songs are unlockable and playable only on LM cabinets.

== Hardware ==
While beatmania IIDX 27 functions on standard Bemani PC cabinets used for many of the previous entries in the series, the new LM cabinets had significant upgrades on the hardware side, in addition to integrations with the software that would allow for exclusive features. LM cabinets include an additional 23-inch LCD touchscreen in the base and a 120 Hz display, replacing the original 60 Hz display used on previous models, in addition to improved CPU, RAM and GPU, which include Intel Core and Nvidia Geforce GTX components. It is the first game in the Beatmania series to run at 120 FPS.
