= Beatmania IIDX =

1999-present rhythm game series

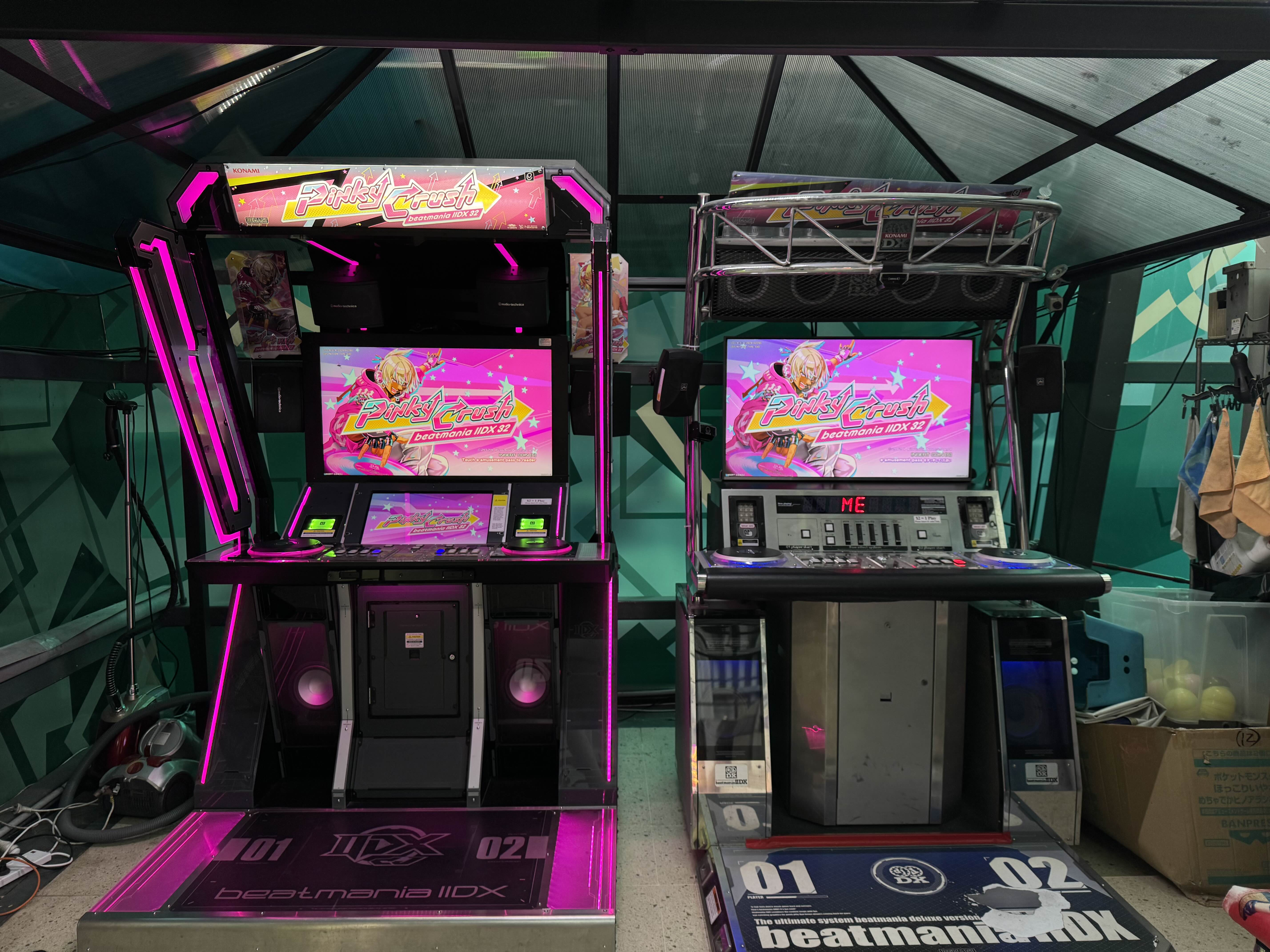
- A LIGHTNING MODEL (left) and a standard (right) cabinet, both running Beatmania IIDX 32 Pinky Crush
- Genre: Music
- Developer: Bemani
- Publisher: Konami
- First release: Beatmania IIDX: JP: February 26, 1999
- Latest release: Beatmania IIDX 34: Zinrai: JP: September 16, 2026
- Parent series: Beatmania

Beatmania IIDX (Japanese: ビートマニア ツーディーエックス, Hepburn: Bītomania Tsū Di Ekkusu) (IIDX) is a series of rhythm video games, that was first released by Konami in Japan on 26 February 1999. Beatmania IIDX has since spawned 35 arcade releases and 14 console releases on the Sony PlayStation 2. It is the sequel to the beatmania game series, and is part of the Bemani line of music games.

Initially conceived and developed as a sequel to Beatmania, Konami released Beatmania IIDX in Japan in 1999. The development team designed the game to simulate the experience of a DJ performing at a real venue, and gave the cabinet a "club Visual Jockey style." While its predecessor used five keys, IIDX has seven of them, increasing the game's complexity and skill ceiling. The larger controller was integrated into the cabinet alongside a larger 40-inch widescreen monitor, dual speakers, and spotlights to replicate the feeling of performing at a live venue.

== Gameplay ==
Beatmania IIDX tasks the player with performing songs through a controller consisting of seven buttons and a turntable. Hitting the notes at the correct time increases the score and groove gauge bar, which if equal to or above 80% on Normal difficulty will allow the player to clear the stage. Failing to hit the notes at the correct time depletes the players groove gauge until it is empty.

Starting from beatmania IIDX 17 SIRIUS, two new note types are added: Charge Notes, which require the user to hold and release buttons in time with the music, and Backspin Scratches, which involve spinning the turntable in one direction and then turning it in the opposite direction at the end of the note. beatmania IIDX 23 copula introduced a variation called Hell Charge Notes, which refill the gauge when held down but rapidly deplete it when not. Unlike regular Charge Notes, they can be pressed at any time, though missing the start or end will still break the player's combo.

Aside from standard single play with seven buttons and a turntable, Beatmania IIDX offers doubles play-style, where users can play with fourteen buttons and two turntables. Certain versions of Beatmania IIDX have modes that are available in both single and double play-styles such as Course mode, Step-up and Arena. In Course mode players are challenged to complete four songs in a row of similar difficulty with a shared health bar, if the health bar reaches zero during any song, the game ends. Step-up mode allows players to play up to four songs without fear of a game-over. However, only a small selections of songs will be available. Arena mode matches up to 4 players in a competitive lobby where each player can pick one song, whichever player performed the best across all 4 songs wins.

=== Difficulty levels ===
Originally, Beatmania IIDX difficulties ranged from "Level 1" to "Level 7". However, beatmania IIDX 5th Style, beatmania IIDX 10th Style and beatmania IIDX 11 IIDXRED added "Flashing 7s", "Level 8" and "Level 8+" respectively.

With the release of beatmania IIDX 12 HAPPY SKY, songs were re-rated on a new difficulty scale ranging from "Level 1" to "Level 12". This has remained the standard in all subsequent releases.

=== Groove gauge ===
When playing a song in Beatmania IIDX players can set how their groove gauge functions. Easy & Assist Gauge will drain slower on misses, with Assist lowering the bar to clear to 50% instead of the usual 80%. Hard & EX Hard Gauges drain at higher rates when a player misses, and do not regrow as quickly as other gauges. When a Hard or EX Hard gauge hits zero, the song immediately ends.

When a song is cleared, a player will be rewarded with a lamp relative to the gauge used to clear. Available lamps are: Fail, Assist Clear, Easy Clear, Normal Clear, Hard Clear, EX Hard Clear & Full Combo. The lamps appear next to songs during song select.

== History ==
In 1997, Konami distributed its Games & Music Division's (G.M.D.) Beatmania in Japan as a DJ-themed arcade title, significantly influencing rhythm games. Its surprise success influenced the G.M.D. to rename itself Bemani, a portmanteau of "Beatmania", and the studio made several spinoffs following its release, including Pop'n Music and Dance Dance Revolution. Due to the success of Beatmania, Konami developed and released its sequel 2 years later in 1999.

Bemani developed several updates to the game after its release, including a crossover in Beatmania IIDX Club Version (later Substream) cabinets with Dance Dance Revolution 2ndMix Club Version 1 and 2 machines for simultaneous play, leading to increased success and popularity. In late 1999, the publisher hired artist Goli to design graphics and characters for Beatmania IIDX 2nd Style. The next game in the IIDX series, 3rd Style, featured a new aesthetic and was ported to the PlayStation 2. In 2002, 8th Style was released after the discontinuation of the original five-key Beatmania. Foster said the updates popularized the game to the point that it overshadowed Beatmania, and IIDX earned more new songs and became known for being very difficult. A sequel with a five-key controller, Beatmania III, was released in 2000 but did not see similar success. Beatmania IIDX still receives yearly arcade updates which feature new songs, new theming and new events.

=== Home releases ===
A video game named Beatmania was released in North America in 2006 for the PlayStation 2, This was one of the only official ways to play Beatmania IIDX in the west. In 2015, a PC release titled beatmania IIDX INFINITAS was announced, and began alpha testing in September. On January 29, 2020, Heroic Verse's LIGHTNING MODEL cabinets received a North American release. On August 5, 2020, a new version of Infinitas was released. This new version is similar to the Lightning upgrade for arcade releases, having support for 120 Hz displays and an improved engine.

In 2019, three mobile games were announced by Konami during the Japan Amusement Expo, representing three Bemani series: Beatmania IIDX, Dance Dance Revolution, and Sound Voltex. Only Beatmania IIDX Ultimate Mobile was released to the public, with Sound Voltex and Dance Dance Revolution Ultimate Mobile being cancelled shortly after location tests.

== Hardware ==
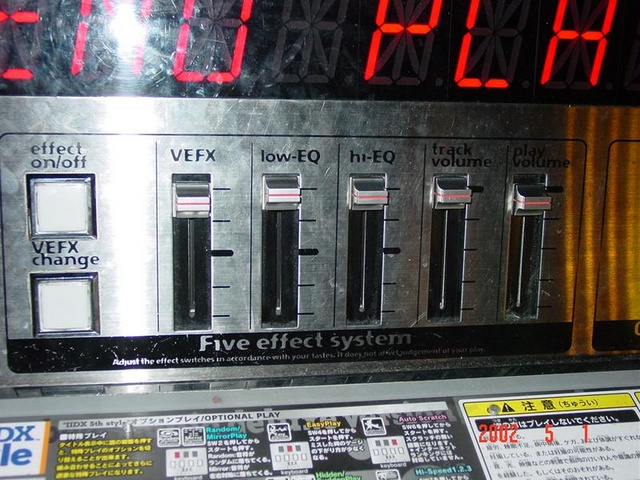
Effector controls and led ticker in a standard cabinet. The track volume slider has been replaced by a "filter" controller since 9th Style.

The beatmania IIDX cabinet has many standard features that are found in traditional arcade cabinets such as a widescreen display, powerful speakers, and start buttons. Also, unique to IIDX cabinets are the effector buttons and sliders, a bass platform transducer, marquee, and DJ simulating controller. The effector buttons and sliders allow the player to control the volume levels within the game and manipulate the music by adding additional sound effects. The bass platform vibrates beneath the player's feet to the beat of the music being played. The marquee is a series of sixteen-segment display LEDs, used to display game information and scores during gameplay.

=== Controller information ===
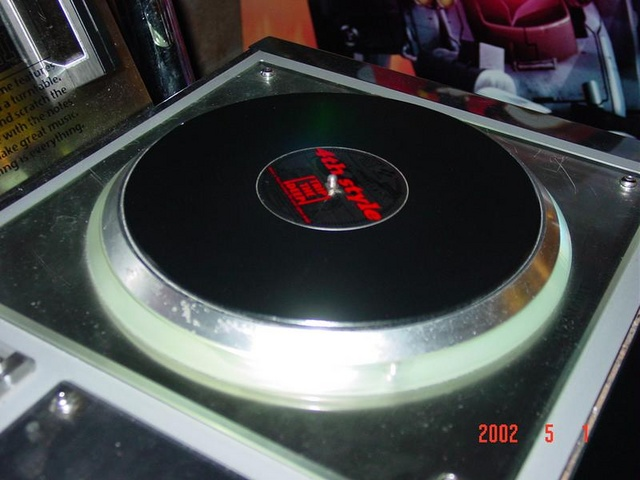
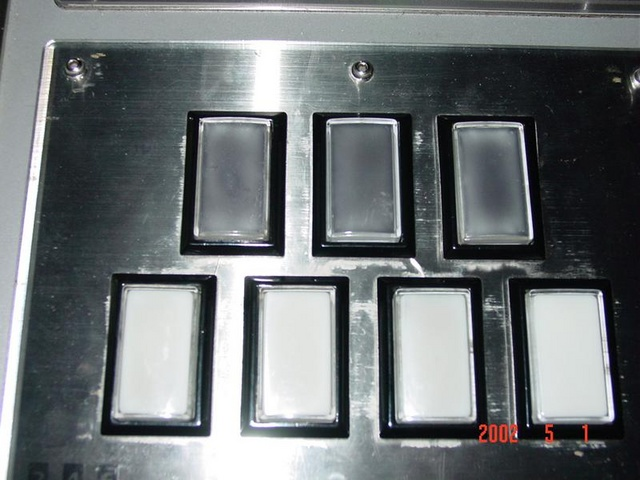
Beatmania IIDX's controller has seven keys and a turntable.

beatmania IIDX controls consist two sets of seven keys on each player's side, along with a turntable on each side. The turntable for the left player's side is to the left of the keys, while the one on the right player's side is to the right.

Each set of keys is arranged in a pattern of four white keys beneath three black keys. The black keys are offset from the white keys so that each pair of adjacent white keys has a black key above and in between them. This arrangement mimics the F, F#, G, G#, A, A#, B keys on a musical keyboard, though beatmania keys, being about twice as long as they are wide, do not resemble piano keys. The keys are commonly numbered 1 through 7, from left to right. The four white keys are numbered 1, 3, 5, and 7; the three black keys are numbered 2, 4, 6.

Along the release of Beatmania IIDX 25 Cannon Ballers, two cameras are installed, one on the metal cage pointing to the controls, and another at left pointing to the players. Initially, the game would not boot up if the cameras weren't attached; this was fixed after initial release. After the release of Beatmania IIDX 26 Rootage, QR code reading functionality was added to the left camera.

With the release of beatmania IIDX 27 Heroic Verse, a new cabinet called LIGHTNING MODEL was introduced. The effect sliders, LCD marquee and keypads have been replaced with a touchscreen called the Premium Area, located under the screen where the sliders used to be. Due to the removal of the slider panel, the start buttons have been relocated to the upper-left and upper-right of the 1P and 2P keys respectively, and the VEFX and EFFECT buttons are located above the coin slot, as with 5-key beatmania machines. The front of the cabinet also features 3.5mm headphone jacks on each side, although this does not mute the speakers.

=== e-amusement ===
Since 9th Style, the game has featured integration with Konami's e-amusement platform, which uses a card inserted at the beginning of the game to save stats, scores, allow customization, and track scores in comparison to previous plays and against others over the internet. A magnetic card reader was used from 9th Style to Happy Sky (12th). From Distorted onwards the newer type Contactless smartcard Konami e-amusement Pass system has been used. 9th Style did not require an internet connection to use a subset of the e-amusement functionality, but 10th and on required an internet connection to function, which must be provided by a subscription from Konami. Some versions can customize frames, BGM in SELECT MUSIC screen, notes, etc.. e-amusement is not available outside of the primary markets for IIDX (Japan, Asia, and the United States), which has left imported machines outside of Asia without full access to hidden songs and extra stages due to the increasing functionality and integration of e-amusement in more recent styles. However, new songs from e-amusement enabled styles can still be accessed on console versions (which can be imported from Japan) or in INFINITAS. As of Tricoro, required an internet connection to startup instead. As of Rootage, offline kits are returned.

=== Internal hardware ===
Each game since 9th style runs on a Bemani PC, a custom PC based system designed specifically for Bemani's games. Games prior to 9th style use Bemani Twinkle, which in turn is a PlayStation with a superimposer and an advanced sound board combined with a DVD player. As of the newest cabinet model for the "Lightning" cabinet introduced with Beatmania IIDX 27: Heroic Verse, there is an Nvidia GTX 1660, an Intel Core i5 9400F, 8GB of DDR4 RAM, and a 256GB SATA SSD. The cabinets also use a custom amplifier in addition to an Asus Xonar XE sound card, and run a limited version of Windows 10. There is also a 120 Hz main display and a touchscreen second display. Older versions of the cabinets running PC based hardware generally were significantly weaker as they did not have to power 2 displays. The final revision prior to the Lightning Model use Bemani PC ADE-6291, that is powered by an AMD RX-421BD, an R7 Radeon GPU and has 4GB of RAM.

== Music ==
Music is an integral part of the beatmania IIDX series. Featuring a wide selection of genres and artists, both licensed and in-house, the Beatmania IIDX series is well known for its original music. Konami produces an original soundtrack of each game, usually a few months after release, due to the appeal of the music. Konami also releases original albums by Beatmania IIDX artists through its online store, Konamistyle. It's also a tradition that Konami crossovers some songs from and into other Bemani games such as Pop'n Music, Dance Dance Revolution, and Sound Voltex.

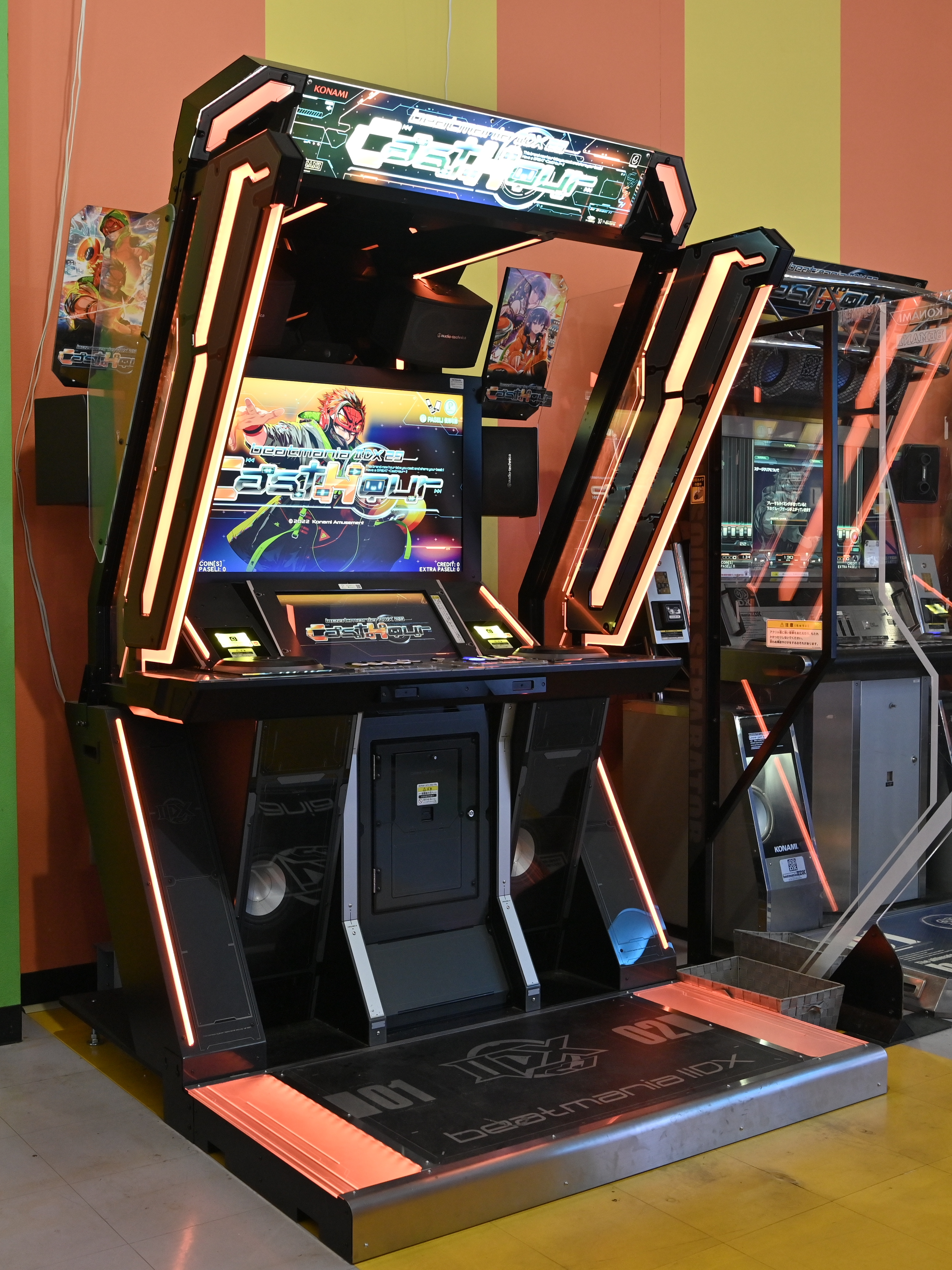
A LIGHTNING MODEL cabinet running beatmania IIDX 29 CastHour

Each new AC release typically features around 11 songs at least to 123 songs at most, with a selection of songs returning from previous versions and some songs having LEGGENDARIA charts. The current release, beatmania IIDX 34 ZINRAI, features a library of 1,881 songs (43 new, 1,919 carried over, and 0 returning). Some songs are split across difficulties or styles. CS releases feature all of the new songs of their corresponding AC versions (with limited exceptions), 5-10 CS exclusive songs, around 25 "revival" (returning) songs, and 1-3 preview songs, for a total of around 60-100 songs (Empress uses 2 discs, each with 99 songs per disc). Arcade versions since 9th Style run on Bemani PC, rather than the PlayStation-based Bemani Twinkle, allowing them to have more songs with higher quality sound due to larger hard drives and higher end hardware.

Songs often include music videos when played, although only some songs contain dedicated videos. Some songs contain generic videos shared by multiple songs, and some of these have additional animated graphics overlaid atop them. Beginning with beatmania IIDX 19 Lincle, players can select Qpro characters or customize them, and some songs show Qpros as part of overlays (exc. in beatmania IIDX Infinitas, due to Qpros being unsupported). Beginning with beatmania IIDX 20 tricoro, overlays of some songs were removed, and in beatmania IIDX 9th Style, the effector system is not available, both due to hardware limitations. Beginning with beatmania IIDX 25 CANNON BALLERS, the effector system is expanded to 8 effect options, adjunt with EQ ONLY. In mobile games and in beatmania IIDX Infinitas (2015), the effector system is disabled.

Beatmania IIDX arcade release timeline
1999	Beatmania IIDX
1999	Beatmania IIDX substream
1999	Beatmania IIDX 2nd style
2000	Beatmania IIDX 3rd style
2000	Beatmania IIDX 4th style
2001	Beatmania IIDX 5th style
2001	Beatmania IIDX 6th style
2002	Beatmania IIDX 7th style
2002	Beatmania IIDX 8th style
2003	Beatmania IIDX 9th style
2004	Beatmania IIDX 10th style
2004	Beatmania IIDX 11 IIDX RED
2005	Beatmania IIDX 12 HAPPY SKY
2006	Beatmania IIDX 13 DistorteD
2006	Beatmania IIDX 14 Gold
2007	Beatmania IIDX 15 DJ Troopers
2008	Beatmania IIDX 16 Empress
2009	Beatmania IIDX 17 SIRIUS
2010	Beatmania IIDX 18 Resort Anthem
2011	Beatmania IIDX 19 Lincle
2012	Beatmania IIDX 20 Tricoro
2013	Beatmania IIDX 21 SPADA
2014	Beatmania IIDX 22 PENDUAL
2015	Beatmania IIDX 23 Copula
2016	Beatmania IIDX 24 SINOBUZ
2017	Beatmania IIDX 25 CANNON BALLERS
2018	Beatmania IIDX 26 Rootage
2019	Beatmania IIDX 27 HEROIC VERSE
2020	Beatmania IIDX 28 BISTROVER
2021	Beatmania IIDX 29 CastHour
2022	Beatmania IIDX 30 RESIDENT
2023	Beatmania IIDX 31 EPOLIS
2024	Beatmania IIDX 32 Pinky Crush
2025	Beatmania IIDX 33 Sparkle Shower
2026	Beatmania IIDX 34 ZINRAI

== Releases ==
Beatmania IIDX is an arcade sequel to Konami's Beatmania Series, starting with bi-annual "Style" releases in 1999 followed by themed annual releases from 2004 onwards. Starting with 3rd style, Beatmania IIDX saw releases on the PlayStation 2 home consoles which continued up until Empress.

Beginning with Beatmania IIDX 27 HEROIC VERSE, LIGHTNING MODEL cabinets were officially sold for use in the United States due to the increase presence of Round One arcades.

=== Home releases ===
Starting with 3rd style, Beatmania IIDX was released in Japan on PlayStation 2 home consoles. These releases generally followed their corresponding arcade versions up until Beatmania IIDX 16 EMPRESS, which was the final style to have a corresponding console version. PlayStation 2 versions of Beatmania IIDX never saw sale overseas however the US received Beatmania in 2006 which contained songs from both the beatmania and Beatmania IIDX series, as well as eight new licensed songs. This was the only beatmania game officially released in the region until Beatmania IIDX 27 HEROIC VERSE in 2020.

Beatmania IIDX home releases are known as CS (Consumer Software or Console) versions, while the arcade versions are known as AC (Arcade Cabinet) versions. The CS games can be played with a DualShock controller or with a special controller sold by konami that recereates the arcade experience.

In 2015 Konami released Beatmania IIDX INFINITAS for Home PCs. The game required a monthly subscription to play. Infinitas was given a major overhaul in 2020 allowing for 120 Hz gameplay to be inline with the LIGHTNING MODEL. Unlike other home releases, this version does not tie in with an arcade version.

Cover of the CS version of IIDX 11 IIDXRED

Cover of the CS version of IIDX 12: Happy Sky

Cover of the CS version of IIDX 13: Distorted

Cover of the CS version of IIDX 14: Gold

== See also ==
- Beatmania
- Beatmania III

== Notes and references ==
=== Bibliography ===
- Ashcraft, Brian (2008). Arcade Mania! The Turbo-Charged World of Japan's Games Centers. Kodansha International. ISBN 978-4-7700-3078-8.
- Cook, Nicholas; Pettengill, Richard (May 16, 2013). Taking It to the Bridge: Music as Performance. University of Michigan Press. ISBN 9780472051779.
