= Beatmania IIDX 17: Sirius =

2009 video game

- Arcade flyer
- Developer: Konami Computer Entertainment Tokyo
- Publisher: Konami Computer Entertainment Tokyo
- Series: Beatmania IIDX, Bemani
- Platform: Arcade
- Release: JP: October 21, 2009
- Genre: Music
- Modes: Single-player & Multiplayer
- Arcade system: Konami Bemani PC Type 2

Beatmania IIDX 17: Sirius is the 17th installment in Konami's Beatmania IIDX series of music video games. The main motif of Sirius's UI is astronomy, as the game is named after Sirius, known to be the brightest star in the night sky. Public location tests began on May 27, 2009, and the game itself was released on October 21, 2009.

== Development ==
The existence of a 17th version in the beatmania IIDX series was confirmed by Konami on May 25, 2009, alongside the announcement of the first public location tests at the Cat's Eye arcade in Japan, which had already been promoting the location tests set to begin on the 27th of May for several days before the official announcement.

The location tests revealed new features contained in the game, such as "charge notes", and contained a sampling of songs slated to be included in the final release. Additional tests were held in late June to early July in Nagoya and at an arcade at the Norbesa in Sapporo.

== Gameplay ==
Beatmania IIDX tasks the player with performing songs through a controller consisting of seven key buttons and a scratchable turntable. Hitting the notes with strong timing increases the score and groove gauge bar, allowing the player to finish the stage. Failing to do so depletes the gauge until it is empty, abruptly ending the song.

Sirius adds two additional note types to the game, "charge notes", or Hold-me Notes which must be held for their duration, and the "back spin scratch", a type of scratching which must be spun on one direction continuously and spun again to the opposite side at the end of the note. Selected songs contained these features in the location test build.

A new "party mode" consists of a story mode where players earn "fans" based on their performances.

Another new mode, "League Mode" is a course where each song is selected based on the grade that they chose, from D grade to S grade. Songs chosen and the score that earns will convert into League points in the end. The selected songs number is ranged from 4 to 12. The score from this mode is also available to upgrade their own standards.

== Song list ==
There are 66 new songs and 512 songs carried over from previous releases for a total of 578 songs in this game. The entire song list contains songs by Konami original artists and others.

Genre	Song	Artist	Tier
E-Dance Pop	"beatchic☆仮面～好き、でいさせて～"	上野圭市 (transforming into Masao♥Lovely) feat. 星野奏子	
Electropop	"being torn the sky"	猫叉Master+ feat. JUNE	
Happy hardcore	"bloomin' feeling"	Ryu☆	
Latin house	"Brazilian Fire"	Ben Franklin	
Trip hop	"Chocolate Dancing"	Yoche feat.Mayu	
Electro	"Do Back Burn"	PRASTIK DANCEFLOOR	
UK hardcore	"DESIRE"	M-Project fw. GUHROOVY	
Hardcore techno	"DOMINION"	L.E.D.-G	
White Sequence	"DROP"	dj TAKA feat. Kanako Hoshino	
Trance-core	"Elisha"	DJ YOSHITAKA	
Cyberpunk	"Empire State Glory"	Dirty Androids	
Hardcore techno	"GALGALIM"	L.E.D.	
Tech-dance	"Hydrogen Blueback"	MAD CHILD	
Eurobeat	"Keep it -秋葉工房Mix-"	DJ Command feat.NAGISA	
Electro	"Last Burning"	Dirty Androids	
Bubblegum dance	"Light Shine"	Ryu☆	
Serious Step	"London Affairs Beckoned With Money Loved By Yellow Papers."	Paddington Private Detective	
Buchiage trance	"MIRACLE MEETS"	Lucky Vacuum	
Electropop	"MIRU key way"	Jacca PoP	Licensed song.
Eurobeat	"Mysterious Time"	Y&Co.	
Only One Idol Song	"NEW SENSATION -もう、あなたしか見えない-"	SUPER HEROINE 彩香 -AYAKA-	
Electropop	"NoN-Fiction Story!"	Creative Life	
Techno, dance	"One of A Kind"	Crystal Begley	
Psy Trance (Morning)	"Programmed Sun"	kors k	
Astral Choir	"Raison d'être～交差する宿命～" (Raison d'être -Intersection of Fates-)	Zektbach	
Tech-breakbeats	"Red, by Full Metal Jacket"	DJ Mass MAD Izm*	
Actress	"Roots of my way!"	ナイア (Voiced by Masumi Asano)	
Only One Ballad	"She is my wife"	SUPER STAR 満-MITSURU-	Appeared in DDR X2.
Emo	"Sorrows"	Asako Yoshihiro	from Pop'n Music 16: Party.
Drum'N'Metal	"Sunrise"	good-cool ft. KOЯO	
Club 80's	"To the Future"	seiya-murai	
Electro	"with me..."	Sōta Fujimori feat. Kemy	
Insanio	"かずあそび" (Kazuasobi)	CULTVOICE by S.S.D.PRODUCTS	
J-pop	"コスモス" (Cosmos)	TSU-NA	
Distorted new age	"バビロニア" (Babylonia)	劇団レコード	
モッシュ (Moshing)	"フェティッシュペイパー ～脇の汗回転ガール～ (Fetish Paper ~Waki no Ase Kaiten Girl~)	ガキ大将ティーム	
Star pop	"未来のプリズム" (Mirai No Prism / Prism of Future)	星野奏子	
Pops	"たからもの" (Takaramono)	セリカ&エリカ (Voiced by Mai Nakahara & Rina Satō)	Party Mode Secret Song.
Electric Fusion	"Session 1 -Genesis-"	PRASTIK DANCEFLOOR	Extra Stage.
Industrial	"Bad Maniacs"	kors k as teranoid	One More Extra Stage.

=== Parallel Rotation ===
The "Parallel Rotation" is an Extra Stage system contained within Sirius, containing various tiers based on previous releases of the Beatmania IIDX franchise, each containing various remixes of songs from their respective title and songs previously exclusive to their respective home version.

Genre	Song	Artist	Tier
Hardcore	"eRAseRmOToRpHAntOM"	L.E.D.-G VS GUHROOVY	P.R. RED
Psychedelic trance	"spiral galaxy -L.E.D. STYLE SPREADING PARTICLE BEAM MIX-"	Remixed by L.E.D..	P.R. RED
World/Electronica	"水上の提督 (Short mix from "幻想水滸伝V")" (The Dahak's Departure)	猫叉Master	P.R. RED
Valse	"ワルツ第17番 ト短調"大犬のワルツ" (Waltz No. 17 in G minor, "Valse du Grande Chien")	virkato	P.R. RED Extra
Drum and bass	"DAWN -THE NEXT ENDEAVOUR-"	L.E.D. fw.堀澤麻衣子	P.R. Happy Sky
Trance	"SPARK ! -essential RMX-"	Remixed by dj TAKA VS PINK PONG.	P.R. Happy Sky
World/Electronica	"サヨナラ・ヘヴン" (Sayonara Heaven)	猫叉Master	P.R. Happy Sky
Hardcore techno	"EXUSIA"	L.E.D.-G	P.R. Happy Sky Extra
Sublime Techno	"CaptivAte ～裁き～(SUBLIME TECHNO MIX)"	Remixed by DJ YOSHITAKA.	P.R. DistorteD
Trance	"quell ～the seventh slave～"	dj TAKA Vs. DJ YOSHITAKA	P.R. DistorteD
Hardstyle	"SOLID STATE SQUAD"	kors k Vs. L.E.D.	P.R. DistorteD
Experimental music	"G59"	怒れる金の獅子	P.R. DistorteD Extra
Psyche Trance	"DENJIN AKATSUKINI TAORERU -SF PureAnalogSynth Mix-"	Remixed by Sota Fujimori.	P.R. Gold
Epic trance	"The Story Begins"	SADA & Sota	P.R. Gold
Techno	"GOLDEN CROSS"	dj REMO-CON VS dj TAKA	P.R. Gold
Techno Pop Speed	"mosaic"	Auridy	P.R. Gold Extra
Drum and bass	"BEAUTIFUL ANGEL"	DJ SWAN (Toshiaki Komiya & Keiichi Ueno)	P.R. DJ Troopers
Eurobeat	"Dazzlin' Darlin -秋葉工房Mix-"	Remixed by DJ Command.	P.R. DJ Troopers
Drum & Bass	"THE LAST STRIKER"	L.E.D.	P.R. DJ Troopers
Next Skool Breakbeats Hardcore	"D"	Eagle	P.R. DJ Troopers Extra
Akashic Records	"Almagest"	Galdeira (DJ YOSHITAKA & TOMOSUKE)	P.R. One More Extra Stage

=== Jubeat ripples x Beatmania IIDX 17 SIRIUS Append Style ===
Beatmania IIDX 17 Sirius can be linked with jubeat ripples which can unlock new songs for both games. Starting from March 8, 2010, the player can unlock "bass 2 bass", "IN THE NAME OF LOVE", and "Special One" using saved data of jubeat ripples on e-AMUSEMENT. Then, starting from March 18, 2010, if the player has played those three unlocks on Beatmania IIDX 17 Sirius, the player may unlock "AIR RAID FROM THA UNDAGROUND" in thecthen-newly released jubeat ripples APPEND. After playing that song, it would also unlock in Beatmania IIDX 17 Sirius. Finally, after playing all four songs above on Beatmania IIDX 17 Sirius, "Evans" will be unlocked on that game.

Genre	Song	Artist	Tier
Bubblegum Dance	"bass 2 bass"	Ryu☆	Jubeat ripples x Beatmania IIDX 17 Sirius from Jubeat
Eurobeat	"IN THE NAME OF LOVE"	Y&Co. feat. Erica	Jubeat ripples x Beatmania IIDX 17 Sirius from Jubeat
J-House	"Special One"	kors k feat. Suzuyo Miyamoto	Jubeat ripples x Beatmania IIDX 17 Sirius from Jubeat
Speedcore	"AIR RAID FROM THA UNDAGROUND"	GUHROOVY	Jubeat ripples APPEND x Beatmania IIDX 17 Sirius
Hard Renaissance	"Evans"	DJ YOSHITAKA	Jubeat ripples APPEND x Beatmania IIDX 17 Sirius from Jubeat
