= Beatmania IIDX 20: Tricoro =

2012 video game

- Developer: Konami Corporation
- Publisher: Konami Corporation
- Series: Beatmania IIDX, Bemani
- Platform: Arcade
- Release: September 19, 2012 (Dedicated cabinet); September 25, 2012 (Upgrade kits)
- Genre: Music
- Modes: Single-player & Multiplayer
- Arcade system: Konami Bemani PC (E4690)

beatmania IIDX 20 tricoro is a music video game and the 20th installment of the beatmania IIDX series of video games. It was first announced on April 14, 2012. Location tests began in Akihabara and Osaka on April 18 and 20, 2012 respectively. Both ended on April 24, 2012. It was released on September 19, 2012 for new cabinets and September 25, 2012 for upgrade kits of old machines. It is the first game in its franchise that runs in 720p HD and that requires an internet connection for startup.

== Gameplay ==
Beatmania IIDX tasks the player with performing songs through a controller consisting of seven key buttons and a scratchable turntable. Hitting the notes with strong timing increases the score and groove gauge bar, allowing the player to finish the stage. Failing to do so depletes the gauge until it is empty, abruptly ending the song.
