= Beatmania IIDX 5th Style =

2001 video game

- Front cover of the CS version
- Developer: Konami
- Publisher: Konami
- Director: Tadao Kageyama
- Series: Beatmania IIDX & Bemani
- Platforms: Arcade & Sony PlayStation 2
- Release: Arcade: JP: March 27, 2001; PlayStation 2: JP: August 30, 2001
- Genre: Music
- Modes: Single-player & Multiplayer
- Arcade system: Bemani Twinkle

Beatmania IIDX 5th Style is the fifth game in the beatmania IIDX series of music video games. It was released in arcades by Konami in 2001. The game features 35 new songs, five of which are hidden. New features introduced in this version are auto-scratch (allows the player to focus on the 7 keys instead of the turntable), as well as two more Hi-Speed settings (HS2 and HS3.) 5th Style's songlist featured the first songs that would later become "flashing 7s", here differentiated from regular 7s with a kanji meaning "forbidden".

== Gameplay ==
Beatmania IIDX tasks the player with performing songs through a controller consisting of seven key buttons and a scratchable turntable. Hitting the notes with strong timing increases the score and groove gauge bar, allowing the player to finish the stage. Failing to do so depletes the gauge until it is empty, abruptly ending the song.

== Music ==
Notable songs from this version include:

- Deadline - the first song in the series to be licensed by the Japanese Avex Trax label.
- V - a popular song by dj. TAKA which is a remix of Vivaldi's Concerto for Violin in F Minor, Op. 8, No. 4, RV297, "Winter", I. Allegro non molto. The song has been featured in eight console versions of beatmania IIDX (5th - 10th, 12th and the US version). It has also been featured as a "crossover song" in Konami's other music game series Dance Dance Revolution and Pop'n music. The song would later be recognized as the oldest song with a difficulty rating of 12, for its Another chart.

== Home version ==
A home version of 5th style was released in Japan for the PlayStation 2 on August 30, 2001. As with other IIDX home releases, it contains all the new songs from the Arcade version, revivals from older styles, and new songs. The game also features a Beginner mode, "Drill Mode" and is supported by the PS2 Hard Drive to improve loading times.
