= Beatmania IIDX Club Version =

1999 video game

- Developer: Konami Computer Entertainment Tokyo
- Publisher: Konami Computer Entertainment Tokyo
- Series: Beatmania IIDX & Bemani
- Platform: Arcade
- Release: JP: April 21, 1999
- Genre: Music
- Modes: Single-player & Multiplayer
- Arcade system: Bemani Twinkle

Beatmania IIDX Club Version was released on April 21, 1999 by Konami to the Japanese arcade audience. It could be linked with a Dance Dance Revolution machine for simultaneous play.

== Gameplay ==
Beatmania IIDX tasks the player with performing songs through a controller consisting of seven key buttons and a scratchable turntable. Hitting the notes with strong timing increases the score and groove gauge bar, allowing the player to finish the stage. Failing to do so depletes the gauge until it is empty, abruptly ending the song.

== Development and release ==
In 1999 Beatmania IIDX was released. Neil Foster of Hardcore Gaming 101 called the game "a rocky start" for the Beatmania IIDX series, since it had music from Beatmania's first two iterations (1st Mix and 2nd Mix) paired with new songs and remixes. According to Foster, many players were initially not impressed with performing old songs on upgraded hardware, so they switched to Beatmania 4th Mix. Bemani developed several updates to the game after its release, including Beatmania IIDX Club Version. Konami decided to link Club Version (later Substream) cabinets with Dance Dance Revolution 2ndMix machines for simultaneous play, leading to increased success.
