= Beatmania IIDX Substream =

1999 video game

- Developer: Konami Computer Entertainment Tokyo
- Publisher: Konami Computer Entertainment Tokyo
- Series: Beatmania IIDX & Bemani
- Platform: Arcade
- Release: JP: July 27, 1999
- Genre: Music
- Modes: Single-player & Multiplayer
- Arcade system: Bemani Twinkle

beatmania IIDX substream is a 1999 music video game which had a different songlist and could be linked to a Dance Dance Revolution machine for simultaneous play. If either the Dance Dance Revolution player or IIDX player made mistakes, the other game became more difficult.

== Gameplay ==
Beatmania IIDX tasks the player with performing songs through a controller consisting of seven key buttons and a scratchable turntable. Hitting the notes with strong timing increases the score and groove gauge bar, allowing the player to finish the stage. Failing to do so depletes the gauge until it is empty, abruptly ending the song.

Song List:

1. BRILLIANT 2U - NAOKI, from DDR 2ndMIX
2. deep in you - dj nagureo, from DDR 2ndMIX Club Version
3. Gentle stress - DJ Swan, from DDR 2ndMIX Club Version
4. GENOM SCREAMS (IIDX Edit) - L.E.D. LIGHT, from DDR EXTREME & DDR 2ndMIX Club Version
5. Macho Gang - ANAL SPYDER, from DDR 2ndMIX Club Version
6. NaHaNaHa vs. Gattchoon Battle - DJ Senda & Tiny-K
7. PARANOiA MAX ~DIRTY MIX~ - 190/ from DDR 2ndMIX
8. RUGGED ASH - SYMPHONIC DEFOGGERS (Yasushi Kurobane), from DDR 2ndMIX Club Version
9. THE EARTH LIGHT - L.E.D. LIGHT, from DDR 2ndMIX Club Version
10. Chotto Kiitena (ZANSHIN-NA MIX) - Laugh & Peace, from DDR 2ndMIX Club Version

== Development and release ==
In 1999 Beatmania IIDX was released. Neil Foster of Hardcore Gaming 101 called the game "a rocky start" for the Beatmania IIDX series, since it had music from Beatmania's first two iterations (1st Mix and 2nd Mix) paired with new songs and remixes. According to Foster, many players were initially not impressed with performing old songs on upgraded hardware, so they switched to Beatmania 4th Mix. Bemani developed several updates to the game after its release, including Beatmania IIDX Substream. Konami decided to link Club Version (later Substream) cabinets with Dance Dance Revolution 2ndMix machines for simultaneous play, leading to increased success.
