= Beatmania (2006 video game) =

- Developer: Konami
- Publishers: Konami of America, Inc
- Platform: PlayStation 2
- Release: NA: March 28, 2006
- Genre: Music game
- Modes: Single-player, multiplayer

Beatmania is a music video game and part of the beatmania IIDX series. Designed for the North American market, it was the only beatmania IIDX game released in the region until the arcade release of beatmania IIDX 27 HEROIC VERSE in 2020. It was released by Konami for the PlayStation 2 on March 28, 2006.

== Reception ==
Reception

Aggregate score
Aggregator	Score
Metacritic	67/100

Review scores
Publication	Score
Electronic Gaming Monthly	5.83/10
Game Informer	8.5/10
GamePro	4.5/5
GameRevolution	B−
GameSpot	5.6/10
GameSpy	3/5
GameZone	8/10
Hardcore Gamer	4/5
IGN	6/10
Official U.S. PlayStation Magazine	3/5
PlayStation: The Official Magazine	7.5/10

The game received "average" reviews according to the review aggregation website Metacritic.
