= Beatmania IIDX 9th Style =

2002 video game

- PS2 cover art
- Developers: Konami (Arcade), Konami Computer Entertainment Studio (Console)
- Publisher: Konami
- Designer: KCET
- Series: beatmania IIDX & Bemani
- Platforms: Arcade & Sony PlayStation 2
- Release: Arcade: JP: June 25, 2003; PlayStation 2: JP: March 24, 2005
- Genre: Music
- Modes: Single-player & Multiplayer
- Arcade system: Konami Bemani PC Type 1

Beatmania IIDX 9th Style is the ninth game in the beatmania IIDX series of music video games. It was released in arcades by Konami in 2003. The game features over 50 new songs, some of which can be unlocked using Konami's e-Amusement platform – which made its official debut on 9th Style.

The interface used by 9th Style is more modern and crisper looking than previous styles, taking advantage of the better graphics capabilities of the new PC-based hardware which 9th Style now utilizes. The new hardware also eliminates the separate DVD player which was used on previous versions for background videos, as all the videos and data are now stored on the hard drive contained within the machine.

== Gameplay ==
Beatmania IIDX tasks the player with performing songs through a controller consisting of seven key buttons and a scratchable turntable. Hitting the notes with strong timing increases the score and groove gauge bar, allowing the player to finish the stage. Failing to do so depletes the gauge until it is empty, abruptly ending the song.

The core gameplay remains the same in 9th Style. 5-key mode has been removed and replaced by a separate 5-key modifier, which can be used on any song on any difficulty.

== Hardware upgrade ==
9th Style was the first version of Beatmania IIDX to use a new Windows XP PC-based platform nicknamed the Bemani PC instead of the PlayStation-based Bemani Twinkle hardware which had been used since the beginning of the series. The improved platform had its benefits, such as better graphics capabilities, network support through e-Amusement, larger storage, and background videos being stored on the hard drive along with the game data (dropping the need for a separate DVD player).

The new platform however, became blamed for a multitude of issues with 9th Style, such as longer load times and off-sync timing windows on some songs.

== e-Amusement ==
9th Style was the first version of IIDX to have support for Konami's new e-Amusement system, which can be used for the saving of stats and records to "entry cards". The entry cards were magnetic cards usually containing game artwork, inserted into a card reader mounted on the sides of the cabinet, and protected by a 4-digit pin. The cards could save stats and scores in between games, allowing new features such as the ability to sort songs by a player's previous performance on it (by letter grades, clear status, or full combos). When connected to the internet, scores could also be uploaded to the internet, but unlike future implementations, this was entirely optional. 9th Style did not require a network connection for full e-Amusement compatibility, and thus could be used while offline too.

== Extra Stage ==
An extra stage can be earned for meeting specific criteria on the final stage. If the last stage is played on Another with Hard Mode enabled on any song rated a Flashing 7, and the player gets a AAA, the player is able to play PARANOiA survivor MAX by 290, well known as the boss song of DDR Extreme. If the stage is played on Hard mode and a grade of AAA is obtained, the player is forced to play One More Extra Stage, this song being Quasar by Outphase. In the PS2 version, getting an A is sufficient.

== Home version ==
A home version of 9th Style was released in Japan for the PlayStation 2 on March 24, 2005. As with other IIDX home releases, it contains all the new songs from the Arcade version, revivals from older styles, and new songs. The home version also features higher quality graphics than previous versions, and S/PDIF audio output for higher quality sound. Of note, the console version of 9th Style does not suffer from the same timing issues as the Arcade version.

The engine and UI of 9th Style (but recolored purple and orange) were also used for the US release of Beatmania.

== Songs ==
This is the complete list of new songs from the arcade version of Beatmania IIDX 9th Style. Songs highlighted green need to be unlocked. The Extra Stage is "PARANOIA survivor MAX", while the One More Extra Stage is "quasar".

Genre	Song	Artist
TRANCE CORE	"Abyss -The Heavens Remix-"	dj TAKA remixed by Ryu*
RAVE	"ACT"	RAM
ELECTRONICA	"ADVANCE"	SLAKE
ENSEMBLE	"ATOMIC AGE"	SHUNZZY
NRG	"BAD BOY BASS!! (dj Remo-con MIX)"	Y&Co.
SPIRITUAL	"bag"	Reven-G
ULTRA ROCK BEAT	"Be Rock U (1998 burst style)"	NAOKI
TECHNO	"BREEDING"	SLAKE
ROCOCO TEK	"BRIGHTNESS DARKNESS"	SPARKER
FRENCH BOSSA	"CHARLOTTE"	Db.Saka feat.Piasa
HEALIN' HARDCORE	"Cradle"	positive MA feat. akino
MIXTURE	"Distress"	dj TAKA remixed by TaQ
ELECTRO POP	"Dreamin' Sun"	Yu Takami
TRANCE	"e-motion 2003 -romantic extra-"	e.o.s remixed by dj TAKA
TECHNO	"ECHOES"	DRAGOON
LATIN GROOVE	"FESTA DO SOL"	Mt.Circle
FUNK SHUFFLE	"fun"	Mr.T
TURKISH PIANO 'N' BASS	"Golden Horn"	Osamu Kubota
POPS	"Honey"	good-cool
EUROBEAT	"HYPER EUROBEAT (2DX style)"	NAOKI feat. PAULA TERRY
EXTREME GRANGE	"I can fly, I've got reason"	Yu Takami
EUROBEAT	"I Was The One (80's EUROBEAT STYLE)"	good-cool remixed by NAOKI
EUROBEAT	"I'm In Love Again -Y&CO. EURO MIX-"	dj TAKA remixed by Y&Co.
DRUM 'N' BASS	"Karma"	TaQ
LOLIPOP	"Let's say Hello!"	Takuma Saiki
TRANCE	"Let The Snow Paint Me (Y&Co. Remix)"	Sana remixed by Y&Co.
SOUL	"lights"	flare
TECHNO	"Logic Board"	dj nagureo
FORKTRONICA	"LOVE IS DROWING"	SLAKE feat.EMIKO
J-HAPPY HARDCORE	"LOVE♥SHINE"	小坂りゆ
TECHNO	"lower world"	D.J.SETUP
GOSPEL	"Make A Difference"	Lala Moore with CoCoRo*Co
EUROBEAT	"MARIA (I believe...)"	NAOKI feat. PAULA TERRY
POST ROCK	"moon_child"	少年ラジオ
HARDCORE RAVE	"one or eight"	sampling masters AYA
HOUSE	"OVER THE CLOUDS -Flying Grind mix-"	Lala Moore remixed by Flying Grind
TRANCE	"POWER DREAM"	PINK PONG
TRANCE	"Prelude"	NAOKI underground
PSYCHEDELIC	"Quickening"	dj TAKA
R&B	"Really Love"	大部真由美
ELECTRO 2 STEP	"RISLIM -Remix-"	ric remixed by Hisashi Nawata
GABBA	"rottel-the-Mercury-"	sampling masters MEGA
HAPPY HANDBAG	"Silvia Drive"	dj TAKA feat. Noria
DRUM 'N' BASS	"SNOW"	RAM
TRANCE	"STAR FIELD"	SADA
HAPPY HARDCORE	"SWEET SWEET ♥ MAGIC"	jun
HIP HOP	"SWEETEST SAVAGE"	ASLETICS
TECHNO	"SWITCH"	RAM
FILTER HOUSE	"The Biggest Roaster"	D.J.Spugna
ELECTRONICA	"The end of my spiritually"	EeL
2 STEP	"traces -tracing you mix-"	TaQ remixed by kors k feat. U
EUROBEAT	"Two DAYS OF LOVE"	tiger YAMATO with マイク吉川 feat. ma-sa
EPIC HOUSE	"u gotta groove -extended joy style-"	dj nagureo remixed by Mr.T
US HARD HOUSE	"WANNA TELL THAT WORD"	SADA
HOUSE	"Your Body"	good-cool feat. Aundréa L. Hopkins
ボデー	"ライオン好き"	AKIRA YAMAOKA
HOUSE	"真夏の花・真夏の夢"	Sana
テクノチョップ	"昭和企業戦士荒山課長"	AKIRA YAMAOKA
JUNGLE MIXTURE	"PARANOIA survivor MAX"	290
TRANCE	"quasar"	OutPhase

Notable songs from this version include:

- Rislim ~remix~ – a remix of Rislim from 5th Style. The song is a subject of an inside joke in the IIDX community, involving a player's fondness for the song, and specific times on when to actually play it.
- rottel-the-Mercury – a continuation of sampling masters MEGA's series of Rotterdam techno songs. The video contains many scenes of food preparation and fishing, creating a double meaning for the title (where Mercury can either be a planet in relation to their previous song rottel-the-sun, or a chemical sometimes found in fish).
- PARANOiA survivor MAX – well known as the most difficult song on the then-recently released DDR Extreme. The song is one of several crossovers from Extreme that are present in 9th Style. It is also the first Extra Stage song to be removed in later arcade releases, as it was removed from Beatmania IIDX 14: Gold.
