= Tomosuke Funaki =

Japanese composer

Tomosuke Funaki 舟木 智介
- Also known as: TOMOSUKE
- Origin: Japan
- Genre: Video game music
- Occupation: Composer
- Years active: 1999–present

Tomosuke Funaki (舟木智介, Funaki Tomosuke; born January 1) is a Japanese composer who has contributed to the Bemani series of music video games. He has produced songs for Beatmania, Beatmania IIDX, Pop'n Music, Dance Maniax, Guitar Freaks, DrumMania, Mambo a Gogo, and Dance Dance Revolution (Dancing Stage). He collaborated with the Shibuya-Kei vocalist "EeL" to provide original songs for BEMANI under his "EeL" pseudonym.

Between 2000 - 2004 Funaki produced a series of Lounge Music compositions to accompany games created by Bemani Works using the name "Orange Lounge". The tracks were recorded with French-speaking Japanese vocalist Shizue Tokui. In all they recorded just 14 tracks, with another eight or more extended remixes Orange Lounge's signature track, "Love Is Orange" is a reference to the 1967 instrumental hit "Love Is Blue" by Paul Mauriat, whose work Funaki has cited as an influence.

"Nick boys" is the pseudonym for his Hip hop-influenced collaboration with Des-ROW. "Zektbach" is the pseudonym used for his classical music influenced concept pieces by forms of fantasy worlds, usually with choirs and classical instrumentation.

== Bemani works ==
=== beatmania ===
- Feel the light, beatmania 6th Mix
- What is love?, beatmania 7th Mix
- u gotta groove -Future Latin Mix-, beatmania Core Remix (remix of u gotta groove, originally made by dj nagureo)

=== Mambo a Gogo ===
- Lover's high
- La brise d'ete
- Gamelan de couple
- Sci-Fi Girl
- Nova Emocao
- One minute Kitchen Battle!

=== Dance ManiaX ===
- Mobo★Moga, Dance ManiaX (under Orange Lounge)
- Jane Jana, Dance ManiaX
- All my love, Dance ManiaX
- Mind Parasite, Dance ManiaX 2nd Mix
- Stay (Mad bouncy version), Dance ManiaX 2nd Mix
- Stay (Organic House version), Dance ManiaX 2nd Mix

=== beatmania IIDX ===
- Comment te dire adieu, beatmania IIDX 6th style (as Orange Lounge, a cover of the Françoise Hardy song written by Serge Gainsbourg)
- Marmalade Reverie, beatmania IIDX 7th style (as Orange Lounge)
- Love Is Orange, beatmania IIDX 8th style (as Orange Lounge)
- The end of my spiritually, beatmania IIDX 9th style (with vocalist EeL)
- Astral Voyage, beatmania IIDX 10th style (with vocalist EeL)
- Les filles balancent, beatmania IIDX 11: IIDX Red (as Orange Lounge)
- Tizona d'El Cid, beatmania IIDX 12: HAPPY SKY
- Apocalypse ～dirge of swans～, beatmania IIDX 13: DistorteD (as Zektbach)
- BREAK OUT, beatmania IIDX 13: DistorteD (as Orange Lounge, a cover of the Swing Out Sister song)
- INFERNO, beatmania IIDX 13: DistorteD (as Caldeira, a collaboration with DJ Yoshitaka)
- カゴノトリ～弐式～ (Kagonotori ~Nishiki~), beatmania IIDX 13: DistorteD (as 橙色特別室 (Orange Lounge))
- Blind Justice ~Torn souls, Hurt Faiths~, beatmania IIDX 14: Gold (as Zektbach)
- クルクル☆ラブ~Opioid Peptide MIX~ (Curucuru Love~Opioid Peptide MIX~), beatmania IIDX 14: GOLD (as イオンチャンネル (Ion Channel))
- Cookie Bouquets (L.E.D. vs Tomosuke fw.crimm) IIDX 15: DJ Troopers
- Ristaccia, beatmania IIDX 15: DJ Troopers (as Zektbach)
- Turii -Panta rhei-, beatmania IIDX 16: EMPRESS (as Zektbach)
- Marie Antoinette(beatmania IIDX 16 EMPRESS：Marguerite du Pré)
- Raison d'être〜交差する宿命〜(beatmania IIDX 17 Sirius：Zektbach)
- Almagest (beatmania IIDX 17 SIRIUS: Galdeira, with DJ Yoshitaka)
- Todestrieb (beatmania IIDX 19 Lincle: Rche)

=== pop'n music ===
- Dimanche, pop'n music 7 (as Orange Lounge)
- Marigold, pop'n music 8
- 100sec. Kitchen Battle!!, pop'n music 8 (as Orange Lounge)
- 777, pop'n music 8 (with vocalist EeL)
- Nick boys, pop'n music ee'MALL (with Des-ROW as Nick Boys)
- 明鏡止水 (Meikyou Shisui), pop'n music 10 (with Asaki)
- Pinky nick, pop'n music ee'MALL 2nd avenue (with Des-ROW as Nick Boys)
- 空言の海 (Munagoto no umi), pop'n music ee'MALL 2nd avenue
- Nick ring, pop'n music 11 (with Des-ROW as Nick Boys)
- Orange AIR-LINE, pop'n music 11 (as Orange Lounge)
- Space Merry Go-Round, pop'n music 12 IROHA (as Dormir)
- Ferris Wheel, pop'n music 13 CARNIVAL
- 文明開化 (Bunmei Kaika), pop'n music 13 CARNIVAL
- コキュトス (Cocytus), pop'n Music 13 CARNIVAL (with Hirofumi Sasaki)
- ポップンカーニバルマーチ (pop'n CARNIVAL Theme), pop'n music 13 CARNIVAL CS
- にゃんだふる55 marble version (Nyandafuru 55 marble version), pop'n music 13 CARNIVAL (as Dormir)
- CODENAME: APRIL, pop'n music 14 FEVER!
- DA DA DA DANCING, pop'n music 14 FEVER! (with Des-ROW)
- Dollar Dollar, pop'n music 14 FEVER! (with Des-ROW as Nick Boys)
- NIGHT FEVER, pop'n music 14 FEVER!
- シャムシールの舞 (Shamshir no Mai), pop'n music 14 FEVER! (as Zektbach)
- 魔法のたまご (Mahou on Tamago), Pop'n music 14 FEVER! CS
- 凛として咲く花の如く (Rinto shite saku hana no gotoku), pop'n Music 15 ADVENTURE
- El pais del sol (GIVE ME MORE SALSA MIX), pop'n music 15 ADVENTURE (as Berimbau '66, remix of El pais del sol, originally by Señorita Rica)
- ポップン大冒険メドレー (Pop'n Daibouken Medley), pop'n music 15 ADVENTURE
- Apocalypse 〜memento mori〜, pop'n music 15 ADVENTURE (as Zektbach)
- Zeta～素数の世界と超越者～ (ZETA ~Sosuu no sekai to chouetsu sha~), pop'n music 15 ADVENTURE (as Zektbach)
- Sorrows, pop'n music 16 PARTY (with Asako Yoshihiro)
- Ergosphere, pop'n music 16 PARTY
- みずうみの記憶 (Mizuumi no kioku), pop'n music 16 PARTY (as Dormir)
- シュレーディガーの猫 (Shurēdingā no neko), pop'n music 16 PARTY (as Cait Sith)
- 誰がために陽はのぼる (Daregatameni yō wa noboru), pop'n music 17 THE MOVIE (with the vocalist MAKI)
- リンゴロジック (Ringorojikku), pop'n music 17 THE MOVIE (as Dormir)
- 蛇神 (Kagachi), pop'n music 18 せんごく列伝 (as Zektbach)
- 黒髪乱れて修羅となりて (Kurokami midarete shura to narite), pop'n music 18 せんごく列伝 (as composer/arranger, song performed by Muramasa Qualia)
- なまいきプリンセス (Namaiki Princess), pop'n music 19 Tune Street (as Dormir)
- μ9, pop'n music portable 2 (as PAXA)
- 恋はどう?モロ◎波動OK☆方程式!! (Koi wa dou? Moro◎Hado OK☆Hoteishiki!!), pop'n music 20 fantasia (with Rikei Danshi)

=== ee'MALL ===
- Nick Boys (as NICK BOYS)
- Pinky Nick (as NICK BOYS)
- 空言の海 (Munagoto no umi) (with 音々 (Nene))

=== Guitar Freaks & DrumMania ===
- IMPLANTATION, DrumMania 2nd Mix
- MONDO STREET, DrumMania 2nd Mix (as Orange Lounge)
- FuriFuri'60, DrumMania 3rd Mix (as Orange Lounge+)
- GIANT SLUG, DrumMania 3rd Mix
- Orange Jet Stream, Guitar Freaks 5th Mix
- Sunflower Girl, Guitar Freaks 6th Mix & DrumMania 5th Mix (as SHORTCUTS)
- Brazilian Anthem, Guitar Freaks 6th Mix & DrumMania 5th Mix (as Berimbau'66)
- Rebirth, Guitar Freaks 7th Mix & DrumMania 6th Mix
- jet coaster☆girl, Guitar Freaks 7th Mix & DrumMania 6th Mix (with Three Berry Icecream)
- pot-pourri d'orange, Guitar Freaks 7th Mix & DrumMania 6th Mix (as Orange Lounge)
- CHOCOLATE PHILOSOPHY, Guitar Freaks 8th Mix & DrumMania 7th Mix (with Yuu Tokiwa)
- INFINITE, Guitar Freaks 8th Mix & DrumMania 7th Mix (as PARALLEL FLOATERS)
- 777 (GFDM ver.), Guitar Freaks 9th Mix & DrumMania 8th Mix (with vocalist EeL)
- Twinkle Star, Guitar Freaks 9th Mix & DrumMania 8th Mix (with serena)
- mint candy ☆ citrus drop, Guitar Freaks 10th Mix & DrumMania 9th Mix (with U.KI)
- カゴノトリ (Kagonotori), Guitar Freaks 10th Mix & DrumMania 9th Mix (as 橙色特別室 (Daidaiiro Tokubetsushitsu), with Asaki and Shizue Tokui)
- pot-pourri d'marmalade, Guitar Freaks 10th Mix & DrumMania 9th Mix (as Orange Lounge)
- Reaching for the Stars, Guitar Freaks 11th Mix & DrumMania 10th Mix (with serena)
- にゃんだふる55 (Nyandafuru 55), Guitar Freaks V & DrumMania V (as Dormir)
- Flow, Guitar Freaks V & DrumMania V (as PARALLEL FLOATERS)
- rebirth of love, Guitar Freaks V & DrumMania V (as Ark of the Covenant)
- Die Zauberflöte, Guitar Freaks V & DrumMania V (as わんにゃん☆パニックス, with Asaki and Hideyuki Ono)
- αρχη, Guitar Freaks V3 & DrumMania V3
- walk with you, Guitar Freaks V6 & DrumMania V6: BLAZING!!!!
- cosmic agenda, Guitar Freaks XG2 & DrumMania XG2: Groove to Live (with frances maya)

=== Dance Dance Revolution/Dancing Stage ===
- Electrical Parade ~Retro Future Mix~, Dancing Stage featuring Disney's Rave (with U1-ASAMi)
- It's a Small World ~Ducking Hardcore Mix~, Dancing Stage featuring Disney's Rave (with U1-ASAMi)
- Vem brincar, Dance Dance Revolution SuperNOVA 2 (under Caldeira, with DJ YOSHITAKA)
- Dreamin', Dance Dance Revolution HOTTEST PARTY 2 (with Adreana)
- Shine, Dance Dance Revolution X2 (with Adreana)
- Seasons, Dance Dance Revolution (2010 Wii release), Dance Dance Revolution X3 VS 2ndMIX(with Crystal Paloa)
- Diamond Night, Dance Dance Revolution II (with Alexa Slaymaker)
- Resurrection, Dance Dance Revolution X3 VS 2ndMIX (under Dormir, with crimm)

=== Jubeat ===
- Macuilxochitl, Jubeat Ripples
- さようならトリップ (Sayonara Trip), Jubeat Knit (under Dormir, with crimm)
- 量子の海のリントヴルム (Ryoshi no Umi no Lindworm), Jubeat Copious (under 黒猫ダンジョン)

=== Reflec Beat ===
- L'erisia (Primal Logic), Reflec Beat (under Zektbach)
- Wenkamui, Reflec Beat (under Zektbach)
- Une mage blanche (under Dormir, with crimm)

== Discography ==
- marble
- The Epic of Zektbach -Ristaccia-
- The Epic of Zektbach -Fragments of Aria Te'Laria-
- The Epic of Zektbach -Masinowa-
- Petit March (with Dormir)
