= Jubeat =

2008 rhythm game series

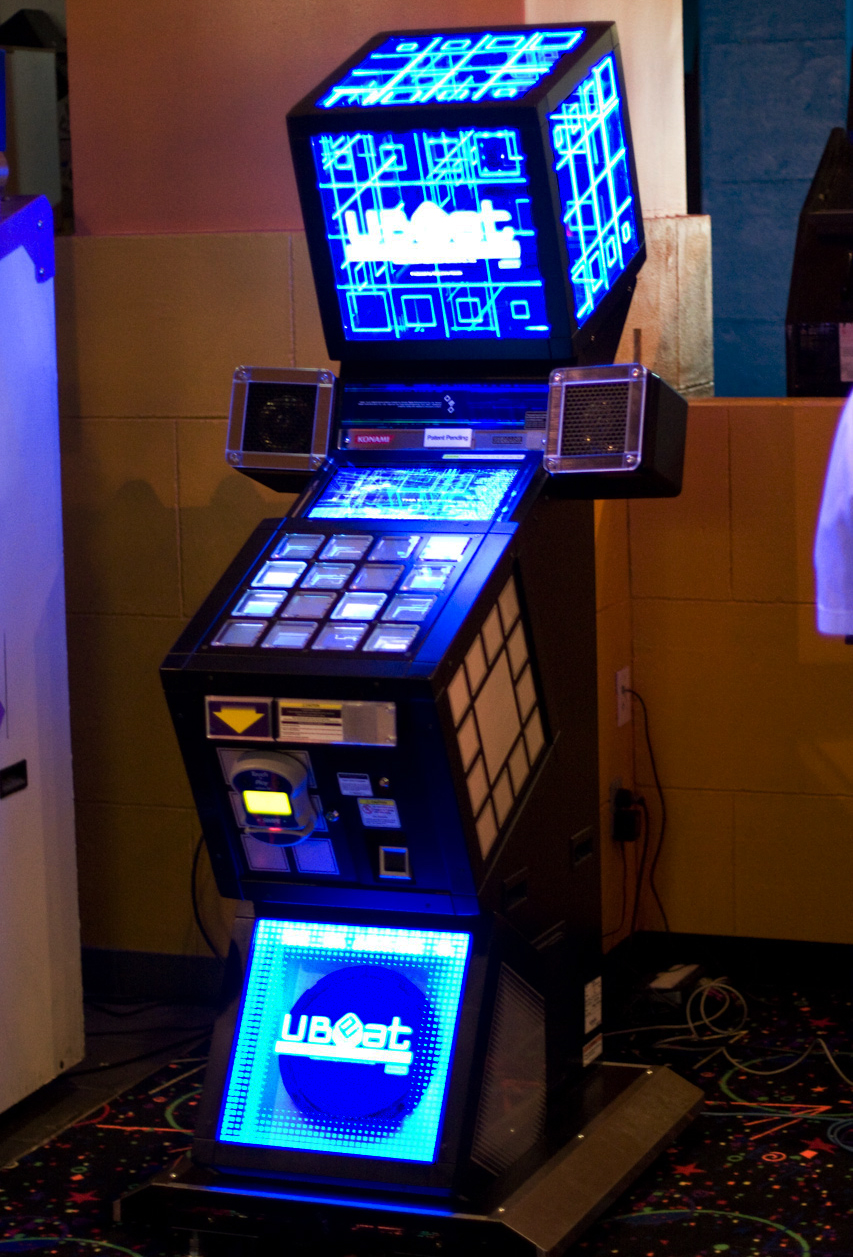
- A Jubeat cabinet (under the title "UBeat") during an American location test in 2008
- Developer: Konami
- Publisher: Konami
- Series: Bemani
- Platforms: Arcade game, iOS
- Genre: Music
- Modes: Single-player, Multiplayer

Jubeat (ユビート, Yubīto), stylized as jubeat, is a series of arcade music video games developed by Konami, and is a part of Konami's Bemani line of music video games. The series uses an arrangement of 16 transparent buttons in a 4x4 grid for gameplay, and each of the 16 buttons overlays a screen.

The game went on several location tests in Asia since December 2007, and was released on July 24, 2008, in Japan, and December in Hong Kong and Macau. The game was not available in mainland China until early 2010. Two attempts to localize the game for the United States market have been made since August 2008, including UBeat, a variant of the first version, and Jukebeat in 2009, a variant based on Jubeat Ripples.

A port of the game for the iOS, Jubeat Plus, was released on Apple's Japanese App Store in 2010. The game was released in the US App Store under the name Jukebeat in 2011. On April 1, 2021, Konami announced a major overhaul to Jubeat Plus via the official Jubeat Twitter account, rebranding it as Jubeat. On May 7, 2021, the rebranded title was launched as a successor to both Jukebeat and Jubeat Plus on both Android and iOS.

The series' current arcade release is Jubeat Beyond the Ave, released on September 20, 2023.

== Gameplay ==
The basic gameplay of the series can be roughly compared to Nintendo DS music games such as Osu! Tatakae! Ouendan and Elite Beat Agents and can be considered to be similar to Whac-A-Mole. The play area is divided into 16 squares, each of which is a touch-sensitive panel with a screen underneath used to navigate and play the game. Animated explosions or other animations, called "markers", that can be chosen at the song select screen are shown within the panels synced to a track of the player's choosing; when they reach a "hot point", which is dependent on the marker chosen, the player must tap the corresponding screen along with the rhythm of the song to score points. Taps can be judged as either Perfect, いい感じ (Good), 早い (Fast), or 遅い (Slow). 3 difficulties (Basic, Advanced, and Extreme) are offered for each song.

As with other Konami games, an e-Amusement card can be used to save statistics and a player ranking, and can also be used to access unlockable songs. Single player and linked multiplayer modes with multiple cabinets are also offered. In the app version of Jubeat, players can choose from three different levels of difficulty, just like in the arcade version: basic, advanced and extreme.

== Games in the series ==
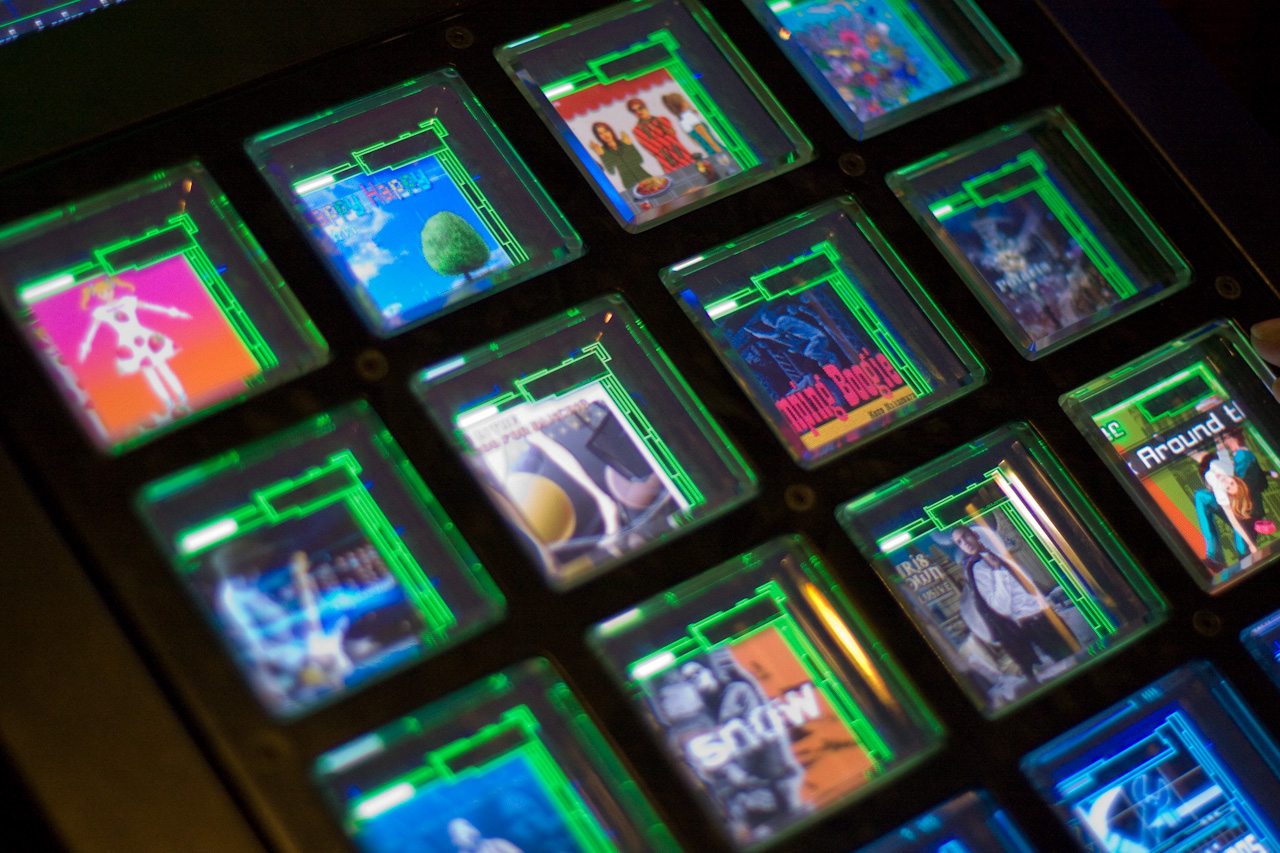
The original jubeat song selection screen

=== Arcade (AC) versions ===
- jubeat (July 24, 2008)
- jubeat ripples (August 5, 2009)
- jubeat ripples APPEND (March 18, 2010)
- jubeat knit (July 29, 2010)
- jubeat knit APPEND (March 23, 2011)
- jubeat copious (September 15, 2011)
- jubeat copious APPEND (March 14, 2012)
- jubeat saucer (September 25, 2012)
- jubeat saucer fulfill (March 3, 2014)
- jubeat prop (February 20, 2015)
- jubeat Qubell (March 30, 2016)
- jubeat clan (July 26, 2017)
- jubeat festo (September 5, 2018)
- jubeat Ave. (August 3, 2022)
- jubeat beyond the Ave. (September 20, 2023)

=== Home (CS) version ===
- jubeat Plus (November 8, 2010)
