= Music of Dance Dance Revolution SuperNova =

Mexicoan

The music of Dance Dance Revolution SuperNova is composed largely of Konami Originals, in-house music written and performed by Konami staff, including older songs carried over from Dance Dance Revolution Extreme and new songs introduced in the SuperNova series. It also contains several licensed tracks.

== Lists of songs ==
=== Arcade ===
The arcade release of SuperNova contains 303 songs, of which 119 are all-new additions to the game. The arcade release of SuperNova 2 contains 357 songs, of which 62 are all-new additions to the game.

Most of the songs featured in SuperNova and SuperNova 2 returned in subsequent arcade releases:

- Dance Dance Revolution X features 97 songs from SuperNova and 61 songs from SuperNova 2.
- Dance Dance Revolution X2 features 82 songs from SuperNova and 50 songs from SuperNova 2.
- Dance Dance Revolution X3 features 81 songs from SuperNova 2.
- Dance Dance Revolution 2013 features 80 songs from SuperNova 2.

Song	Artist	Note
Licensed songs (19 total)
"A LOVE LIKE THIS"	PANDORA	from Dancemania EX 5
"CENTERFOLD (130BPM move it remix)"	CAPTAIN JACK	from Dancemania EX 2
"DA CAPO"	ACE OF BASE	from Dancemania EX 6
"DOESN'T REALLY MATTER"	JANET JACKSON	from the Nutty Professor II: The Klumps Soundtrack
"FEELS JUST LIKE IT SHOULD"	LH MUSIC CREATION	cover of Jamiroquai
"GIRL IN A DAYDREAM"	PANDORA	from Dancemania EX 6
"GIVE ME UP"	LH MUSIC CREATION	cover of Michael Fortunati
"GOLDEN SKY"	SMiLE.dk	from Dancemania EX 5
"I'll Make Love To You"	LH MUSIC CREATION	cover of Boyz II Men
"JERK IT OUT"	CAESARS	from Dancing Stage Unleashed from the album Love for the Streets
"La Bamba"	LH MUSIC CREATION	New Konami Original cover of a classic Mexican folk song
"LONG TRAIN RUNNIN'"	X-TREME	from Dancemania EX 2 cover of The Doobie Brothers
"LOVE AT FIRST SIGHT (TwinMasterplan Mix)"	KYLIE MINOGUE	from Dancemania EX 7
"MODERN GIRL"	SHEENA EASTON	from Dancemania CLASSICS
"MR.DABADA (Groove Wonder Remix)"	CARLOS JEAN	from Dancemania EX 4
"SURRENDER (YOUR LOVE)"	JAVINE	from the album Surrender
"TOXIC (FT Company Edit)"	HELEN	from Dancemania COVERS 01 cover of Britney Spears
"WHAT A WONDERFUL WORLD"	BEATBOX vs DJ MIKO	from Dancemania EX 1 cover of Louis Armstrong
"WOOKIE WOOKIE"	MACHOMAN	from Dancemania EX 9
New Konami Original songs (13 total)
"Baby's Tears"	MIKI ROBERTS	New Konami Original
"Flow"	Scotty D. revisits U1	New Konami Original
"Flow (True Style)"	Scotty D. revisits U1	New Konami Original
"Fly away"	ChiyoTia	New Konami Original
"華爛漫 -Flowers-" (Hana Ranman -Flowers-)	TЁЯRA	New Konami Original
"HONEY♂PUNCH"	小坂りゆ	New Konami Original
"INNOCENCE OF SILENCE"	nc ft. NRG Factory	New Konami Original
"Morning Glory"	BeForU	New Konami Original
"My Only Shining Star"	NAOKI feat. Becky Lucinda	New Konami Original
"PEACE(^^)v"	BeForU	New Konami Original
"SEDUCTION (Vocal Remix)"	NC feat. NRG Factory	New Konami Original
"Star Gate Heaven"	SySF. feat. Donna Burke	New Konami Original
"TRUE♥LOVE"	jun feat. Schanita	New Konami Original
New BEMANI Crossover songs (29 total)
"AA"	D.J.Amuro	from beatmania IIDX 11 IIDXRED
"cachaca"	Mokky de Yah Yah's	from GuitarFreaks 8thMix & DrumMania 7thMix
"CAN'T STOP FALLIN' IN LOVE -super euro version-"	NAOKI with Y&Co.	from Para Para Paradise
"CENTAUR"	Jimmy Weckl	from DrumMania 2ndMix
"チカラ" (Chikara)	BeForU	from GuitarFreaks 9thMix & DrumMania 8thMix
"CURUS"	D-crew	from pop'n music 12 いろは
"男々道" (Dandandou)	Des-ROW・組	from pop'n music 9
"Dragon Blade"	Kozo Nakamura	from GuitarFreaks 11thMix & DrumMania 10thMix
"Drivin'"	NAOKI feat. PAULA TERRY	from beatmania IIDX 8th Style
"DYNAMITE RAVE -super euro version-"	NAOKI with Y&Co.	from Para Para Paradise
"月光蝶" (Gekkōu Chōu)	あさき	from GuitarFreaks 9thMix & DrumMania 8thMix
"HAPPY☆ANGEL"	jun with TAHIRIH	from beatmania IIDX 12 HAPPY SKY
"Hunting for you"	Togo Project feat. Megu & Scotty D.	from beatmania 4thMix -the beat goes on-
"怒れる大きな白い馬" (Ikareru Ookina Shiroi Uma)	Morning Blue Dragon	from pop'n music 11
"カゲロウ" (Kagerōu)	Des-ROW・組スペシャルr	from pop'n music 11
"この子の七つのお祝いに" (Kono ko no Nanatsu no Oiwai ni)	あさき	from GuitarFreaks 10thMix & DrumMania 9thMix
"MONDO STREET"	Orange Lounge	from DrumMania 2ndMix
"MOON"	dj TAKA feat. Erika	from pop'n music 13 カーニバル
"夢幻ノ光" (Mugen no Hikari)	TЁЯRA	from pop'n music 12 いろは
"murmur twins"	yu_tokiwa.djw	from beatmania IIDX 8th Style
"虹色" (Nijiiro)	DJ YOSHITAKA feat G.S.C license	from pop'n music 13 カーニバル
"No.13"	TAKA respect for J.S.B	from beatmania IIDX 10th Style
"Quick Master"	act deft	from pop'n music
"rainbow rainbow"	Ryu☆	from beatmania IIDX 10th Style
"RED ZONE"	Tatsh&NAOKI	from beatmania IIDX 11 IIDXRED
"Ska Ska No.3"	亜熱帯マジ-SKA爆弾	from pop'n music 6
"TIERRA BUENA"	WILMA DE OLIVEIRA	from GuitarFreaks 9thMix & DrumMania 8thMix
"Under the Sky"	南さやか (BeForU) with platoniX	from beatmania IIDX 12 HAPPY SKY
"Xepher"	Tatsh	from beatmania IIDX 12 HAPPY SKY
New From Console Version songs (54 total)
"A Stupid Barber"	Sho-T	from Dance Dance Revolution Extreme (JP PS2)
"Bad Routine"	D.J. Spugna	from DDRMAX2 Dance Dance Revolution from beatmania IIDX 7th Style
"BAILA! BAILA!"	DANDY MINEIRO	from Dance Dance Revolution Ultramix from Dance Maniax
"Baile Le Samba"	Big Idea	from Dance Dance Revolution Ultramix 2
"BALALAIKA, CARRIED WITH THE WIND"	Julie ann Frost	from Dance Dance Revolution Ultramix 2 from GuitarFreaks 6thMix & DrumMania 5thMix
"BALLAD FOR YOU ~想いの雨~" (BALLAD FOR YOU ~Omoi no Ame~)	NM feat. Thomas Howard	from Dance Dance Revolution Ultramix from beatmania IIDX 6th Style
"Brazilian Anthem"	Berimbau '66	from Dance Dance Revolution Ultramix 3 from GuitarFreaks 6thMix & DrumMania 5thMix
"BRILLIANT R・E・D"	NAOKI feat. TAHIRIH WALKER	from Dance Dance Revolution Ultramix 3
"Can Be Real"	Vision F	from Dance Dance Revolution Party Collection
"DoLL"	TЁЯRA	from Dance Dance Revolution Strike from beatmania IIDX 10th Style
"Forever Sunshine"	Chel Y.	from DDRMAX2 Dance Dance Revolution
"Freedom"	BeForU	from Dance Dance Revolution Party Collection
"Funk Boogie"	Funk Kid feat. KOOL BOYS	from Dance Dance Revolution Extreme (NA PS2)
"GORGEOUS 2012"	THE SURRENDERS	from Dance Dance Revolution Ultramix from Dance Maniax
"ヒマワリ" (Himawari)	RIYU from BeForU	from Dance Dance Revolution Ultramix 3 from GuitarFreaks 10thMix & DrumMania 9thMix
"I Need You"	Supa Fova feat. Jenny F.	from DDRMAX2 Dance Dance Revolution
"I'M FOR REAL"	SLAKE feat. JP Miles	from DDRMAX Dance Dance Revolution from beatmania IIDX 4th Style
"iFUTURELIST (DDR VERSION)"	AKIRA YAMAOKA	from Dance Dance Revolution Strike from beatmania IIDX 13 DistorteD
"INSERTiON (Machine Gun Kelly Mix)"	Thuggie D.	from Dance Dance Revolution Ultramix
"INSIDE YOUR HEART"	AKIRA YAMAOKA	from Dance Dance Revolution Extreme 2
"Jam & Marmalade"	FinalOffset	from DDRMAX Dance Dance Revolution from beatmania III
"Keep on Liftin'"	dj nagureo	from DDRMAX2 Dance Dance Revolution from beatmania III
"KEEP ON MOVIN' (DMX MIX)"	N.M.R.-typeG	from Dance Dance Revolution Ultramix from Dance Maniax
"KI・SE・KI (DDR edit)"	BeForU	from DDR Festival Dance Dance Revolution from beatmania IIDX 11 IIDXRED
"Knock Out Regrets"	MAKI@TOGO. BAND	from Dance Dance Revolution Strike
"LOGICAL DASH"	DJ TAKA	from DDRMAX Dance Dance Revolution from beatmania 4thMix -the beat goes on-
"LOVE IS ORANGE"	Orange Lounge	from Dance Dance Revolution Extreme 2 from beatmania IIDX 8th Style
"Make A Difference"	Lala Moore with CoCoRo*Co	from Dance Dance Revolution Extreme 2 from beatmania IIDX 9th Style
"MARIA (I believe...)"	NAOKI feat. PAULA TERRY	from Dance Dance Revolution Extreme 2 from beatmania IIDX 9th Style
"祭 (J-SUMMER MIX)" (Matsuri (J-SUMMER MIX))	RE-VENGE	from Dance Dance Revolution Ultramix from Dance Maniax 2ndMix
"MAX 300 (Super-Max-Me Mix)"	Jondi & Spesh	from Dance Dance Revolution Ultramix 2
"MAXIMIZER"	CLI-MAX S.	from Dance Dance Revolution Extreme (NA PS2)
"MIDNIGHT SPECIAL"	Love machineguns	from Dance Dance Revolution Ultramix 2 from DrumMania 2ndMix
"Mind Parasite"	TOMOSUKE	from Dance Dance Revolution Ultramix from Dance Maniax 2ndMix
"Monkey Punk"	Big Idea	from Dance Dance Revolution Ultramix 2
"PARANOiA -Respect-"	.3k	from Dance Dance Revolution Party Collection
"PASSION OF LOVE"	NAOKI feat. PAULA TERRY	from Dance Dance Revolution Extreme 2
"peace-out"	dj nagureo	from DDRMAX Dance Dance Revolution from beatmania 4thMix -the beat goes on-
"Polovtsian Dances And Chorus"	Naoto Suzuki feat. Martha	from Dance Dance Revolution Extreme 2 Theme song of OZ
"PUT YOUR FAITH IN ME (SATURDAY NIGHT MIX)"	UZI-LAY	from Dance Dance Revolution Ultramix from Dance Maniax
"Quickening"	dj TAKA	from Dance Dance Revolution Ultramix from Dance Maniax 2ndMix
"rainbow flyer"	dj TAKA	from Dance Dance Revolution Ultramix 3 from beatmania IIDX 8th Style
"Saturday Night Love"	Sota feat. Brenda V.	from Dance Dance Revolution Extreme 2
"Scorching Moon"	Shawn the Horny Master	from Dance Dance Revolution Extreme (JP PS2)
"SEDUCTION"	nc ft. FINALFORCE	from Dance Dance Revolution Extreme 2
"STARS★★★ (2nd NAOKI's style)"	TЁЯRA	from Dance Dance Revolution Party Collection
"THE SHINING POLARIS"	L.E.D. feat. Sana	from DDRMAX Dance Dance Revolution from beatmania IIDX 4th Style (PS2)
"TOMORROW"	nc ft. Dreamscanner	from Dance Dance Revolution Extreme 2
"Tomorrow Perfume"	dj TAKA	from DDRMAX2 Dance Dance Revolution from beatmania IIDX 7th Style
"Try 2 Luv. U"	S.F.M.P.	from DDRMAX2 Dance Dance Revolution
"un deux trois"	SDMS	from Dance Dance Revolution Extreme (JP PS2)
"You gotta move it (feat. Julie Rugaard)"	Yuzo Koshiro	from Dance Dance Revolution Extreme 2
"You're Not Here"	Heather	from Dance Dance Revolution Extreme (NA PS2) from Silent Hill 3
"Your Rain (RAGE MIX)"	Akira Yamaoka feat. Mary Elizabeth McGlynn	from Dance Dance Revolution Extreme (NA PS2) from Silent Hill 4: The Room
Extra Stage songs (4 total)
"Healing-D-Vision"	DE-STRAD	New Konami Original; Extra Stage#1
"Fascination MAXX"	100-200-400	New Konami Original; Extra Stage#2
"Fascination -eternal love mix-"	2MB	New Konami Original; Extra Stage#3
"CHAOS"	DE-SIRE retunes	New Konami Original; Encore Extra Stage
Removed songs (56 total)
"BURNIN' THE FLOOR (MOMO MIX)"	NAOKI	from Dance Dance Revolution Extreme
"CARTOON HEROES (Speedy Mix)"	BARBIE YOUNG	from Dance Dance Revolution Extreme
"I DO I DO I DO"	CREAMY	from Dance Dance Revolution Extreme
"IRRESISTIBLEMENT"	WILDSIDE	from Dance Dance Revolution Extreme
"LA COPA DE LA VIDA"	PATRICK VICTORIO	from Dance Dance Revolution Extreme
"Last Message"	good-cool feat. Meg	from Dance Dance Revolution Extreme
"SENORITA (Speedy Mix)"	JENNY ROM	from Dance Dance Revolution Extreme
"SKY HIGH"	DJ MIKO	from Dance Dance Revolution Extreme
"SPEED OVER BEETHOVEN"	ROSE	from Dance Dance Revolution Extreme
"WE ARE THE CHAMPIONS (Factory Team Remix)"	LIVE 2 LOVE	from Dance Dance Revolution Extreme
"WE WILL ROCK YOU"	HOUSEBOYZ	from Dance Dance Revolution Extreme
"White Lovers"	新谷さなえ	from Dance Dance Revolution Extreme
"FANTASY"	LOCKOUT	from DDRMAX2 Dance Dance Revolution 7thMix
"IT'S RAINING MEN (Almighty Mix)"	GERI HALLIWELL	from DDRMAX2 Dance Dance Revolution 7thMix
"LITTLE BOY (BOY ON BOY MIX)"	CAPTAIN JACK	from DDRMAX2 Dance Dance Revolution 7thMix
"LIVING IN AMERICA"	ROSE & JOHN	from DDRMAX2 Dance Dance Revolution 7thMix
"LONG TRAIN RUNNIN'"	BUS STOP	from DDRMAX2 Dance Dance Revolution 7thMix
"MAXIMUM OVERDRIVE (KC Club Mix)"	2 UNLIMITED	from DDRMAX2 Dance Dance Revolution 7thMix
"Spin the disc"	good-cool	from DDRMAX2 Dance Dance Revolution 7thMix
"THE REFLEX"	DURAN DURAN	from DDRMAX2 Dance Dance Revolution 7thMix
"THERE YOU'LL BE"	DJ SPEEDO feat. ANGELICA	from DDRMAX2 Dance Dance Revolution 7thMix
"WAKA LAKA"	JENNY ROM vs ZIPPERS	from DDRMAX2 Dance Dance Revolution 7thMix
"COWGIRL"	BAMBEE	from DDRMAX Dance Dance Revolution 6thMix
"DO YOU REMEMBER ME"	JENNY	from DDRMAX Dance Dance Revolution 6thMix
"FANTASY"	MELISSA	from DDRMAX Dance Dance Revolution 6thMix
"HIGHS OFF U (Scorccio XY Mix)"	4 REEEL	from DDRMAX Dance Dance Revolution 6thMix
"I'M IN THE MOOD FOR DANCING"	SHARON	from DDRMAX Dance Dance Revolution 6thMix
"LET'S GROOVE"	TIPS & TRICKS VS WISDOME	from DDRMAX Dance Dance Revolution 6thMix
"LOVIN' YOU (Rob Searle Club Mix)"	VINYL BABY	from DDRMAX Dance Dance Revolution 6thMix
"MIRACLE"	ST.JENNARO	from DDRMAX Dance Dance Revolution 6thMix
"MY SWEET DARLIN'"	WILDSIDE	from DDRMAX Dance Dance Revolution 6thMix
"NORI NORI NORI"	JUDY CRYSTAL	from DDRMAX Dance Dance Revolution 6thMix
"ORDINARY WORLD"	AURORA featuring NAMIEE COLEMAN	from DDRMAX Dance Dance Revolution 6thMix
"SO DEEP (Perfect Sphere Remix)"	SILVERTEAR	from DDRMAX Dance Dance Revolution 6thMix
"そばかす FRECKLES (KCP Re-Edit)" (Sobakasu FRECKLES (KCP Re-Edit))	TIGGY	from DDRMAX Dance Dance Revolution 6thMix
"SOMEWHERE OVER THE RAINBOW"	COSMIC GATE	from DDRMAX Dance Dance Revolution 6thMix
"TELEPHONE OPERATOR (Club Mix)"	SHELLEY PETER	from DDRMAX Dance Dance Revolution 6thMix
"THE CENTRE OF THE HEART (Stonebridge Club Mix)"	ROXETTE	from DDRMAX Dance Dance Revolution 6thMix
"TWILIGHT ZONE (R-C Extended Club Mix)"	2 UNLIMITED	from DDRMAX Dance Dance Revolution 6thMix
"WITCH DOCTOR (Giant Toons Version)"	CARTOONS	from DDRMAX Dance Dance Revolution 6thMix
"WWW.BLONDE GIRL (MOMO MIX)"	JENNY ROM	from DDRMAX Dance Dance Revolution 6thMix
"夜空ノムコウ" (Yozora no Muko)	EUROBEAT LOVERS	from DDRMAX Dance Dance Revolution 6thMix
"I Was The One"	good-cool	from Dance Dance Revolution 5thMix
"Mr. T (take me higher)"	Risky Men feat. Asuka M	from Dance Dance Revolution 5thMix
"RHYTHM AND POLICE (K.O.G G3 MIX)"	CJ CREW feat. CHRISTIAN D.	from Dance Dance Revolution 4thMix Plus
"SYNCHRONIZED LOVE (Red Monster Hyper Mix)"	JOE RINOIE	from Dance Dance Revolution 4thMix Plus
"SAINT GOES MARCHING (REMIX)"	THE SAINT	from Dance Dance Revolution 4thMix
"CAPTAIN JACK (GRANDALE REMIX)"	CAPTAIN JACK	from Dance Dance Revolution 3rdMix
"DAM DARIRAM"	JOGA	from Dance Dance Revolution 3rdMix
"EL RITMO TROPICAL"	DIXIES GANG	from Dance Dance Revolution 2ndMix
"GET UP'N MOVE"	S&K	from Dance Dance Revolution 2ndMix
"I believe in miracles"	HI-RISE	from Dance Dance Revolution 2ndMix
"IF YOU WERE HERE"	JENNIFER	from Dance Dance Revolution 2ndMix
"BUTTERFLY"	SMiLE.dk	from Dance Dance Revolution
"LET'S GET DOWN"	JT PLAYAZ	from Dance Dance Revolution
"LITTLE BITCH"	THE SPECIALS	from Dance Dance Revolution

=== PlayStation 2 ===
The PlayStation 2 release of Dance Dance Revolution SuperNova contains 79 songs (5 of them only available online) in North America and 84 songs in Japan, while the PlayStation 2 release of Dancing Stage SuperNova contains 69 songs.

==== North America ====
Song	Artist	Note
Licensed songs (20 total)
"Battle Without Honor Or Humanity"	Tomoyasu Hotei	from Kill Bill Vol.1
"CENTERFOLD (130BPM move it remix)"	CAPTAIN JACK	from Dancemania EX 2
"COME CLEAN"	NM featuring Susan Z	cover of Hilary Duff
"Dance, Dance"	Fall Out Boy	from the album From Under the Cork Tree
"Do You Want To"	Franz Ferdinand	from the album You Could Have It So Much Better
"FRECKLES (KCP Re-Edit)"	TIGGY	from DDRMAX Dance Dance Revolution 6thMix cover of Judy and Mary
"Funkytown"	Lipps's. Inc	from beatmania (USA) from the album Mouth to Mouth
"Girls Just Wanna Have Fun"	Cyndi Lauper	from Dancing Stage Max from the album She's So Unusual
"HEAVEN IS A PLACE ON EARTH (German Election Mix)"	JULIA	from Dance Dance Revolution Strike cover of Belinda Carlisle
"JERK IT OUT"	CAESARS	from Dancing Stage Unleashed from the album Love for the Streets
"L.E.F. (Loud Electronic Ferocious)"	Ferry Corsten	from the album L.E.F.
"Let's Dance"	DAVID BOWIE	from Dance Dance Revolution Strike from the album Let's Dance
"MR.DABADA (Groove Wonder Remix)"	CARLOS JEAN	from Dancemania EX 4
"Robogirl"	The Crystal Method	from the album London (Original Motion Picture Soundtrack)
"Shivers (Radio Edit)"	Armin van Buuren	from the album Shivers
"Shout"	Lulu	from Dancing Stage Max from the album Something to Shout About
"SINCE U BEEN GONE"	KELLY CLARKSON	from the album Breakaway
"The Other Side (radio mix)"	Paul van Dyk feat. Wayne Jackson	from the album The Politics of Dancing 2
"Turn on the Music (Axwell Radio Edit)"	Roger Sanchez	from the album Come with Me
"Video Killed The Radio Star"	The Buggles	from Dancing Stage EuroMix from the album The Age of Plastic
New Konami Original songs (15 total)
"Baby's Tears"	MIKI ROBERTS	from Dance Dance Revolution SuperNova
"Feelings Won't Fade (Extend Trance Mix)"	SySF.	New Konami Original; Online exclusive song
"Flow (Jammin' Ragga Mix)"	Scotty D. revisits U1	New Konami Original
"Flow (True Style)"	Scotty D. revisits U1	from Dance Dance Revolution SuperNova
"Fly away"	ChiyoTia	from Dance Dance Revolution SuperNova
"Fly away -mix del matador"	Shawn the Horny Master feat. ChiyoTia	New Konami Original
"HONEY♂PUNCH"	RIYU KOSAKA	from Dance Dance Revolution SuperNova; Online exclusive song
"INNOCENCE OF SILENCE"	nc ft. NRG Factory	from Dance Dance Revolution SuperNova
"My Only Shining Star"	NAOKI feat. Becky Lucinda	from Dance Dance Revolution SuperNova
"PEACE(^^)v"	BeForU	from Dance Dance Revolution SuperNova
"Silver Platform -I wanna get your heart-"	U1 Reincarnates w/Leah	New Konami Original; Online exclusive song
"Star Gate Heaven"	SySF. feat. Donna Burke	from Dance Dance Revolution SuperNova
"Star Gate Heaven (FUTURE LOVE Mix)"	SySF. feat. Donna Burke	New Konami Original
"Trim"	kobo	New Konami Original; Online exclusive song
"TRUE♥LOVE"	jun	from Dance Dance Revolution SuperNova
New BEMANI Crossover songs (20 total)
"AA"	D.J.Amuro	from beatmania IIDX 11 IIDXRED
"CAN'T STOP FALLIN' IN LOVE -super euro version-"	NAOKI with Y&Co.	from Para Para Paradise
"CENTAUR"	Jimmy Weckl	from DrumMania 2ndMix
"CURUS"	D-crew	from pop'n music 12 いろは
"DYNAMITE RAVE -super euro version-"	NAOKI with Y&Co.	from Para Para Paradise
"Gekkou chou"	Asaki	from GuitarFreaks 9thMix & DrumMania 8thMix
"HAPPY☆ANGEL"	jun	from beatmania IIDX 12 HAPPY SKY
"KAGEROW (Dragonfly)"	Des-ROW・UNITED special+r	from pop'n music 11
"MOON"	dj TAKA feat. Erika	from pop'n music 13 カーニバル
"Mugen"	TЁЯRA	from pop'n music 12 いろは
"murmur twins"	Yu_tokiwa.djw	from beatmania IIDX 8th Style
"NIJIIRO"	DJ YOSHITAKA feat G.S.C. license	from pop'n music 13 カーニバル; Online exclusive song
"No.13"	TAKA respect for J.S.B	from beatmania IIDX 10th Style
"Quick Master"	act deft	from pop'n music
"rainbow rainbow"	Ryu☆	from beatmania IIDX 10th Style
"RED ZONE"	Tatsh&NAOKI	from beatmania IIDX 11 IIDXRED
"Ska Ska No.3"	ANETTAI MAJI-SKA BAKUDAN	from pop'n music 6
"TIERRA BUENA"	WILMA DE OLIVEIRA	from GuitarFreaks 9thMix & DrumMania 8thMix
"Tino's White Horse"	Morning Blue Dragon	from pop'n music 11
"Xepher"	Tatsh	from beatmania IIDX 12 HAPPY SKY
Returning Konami Original songs (19 total)
"Baile Le Samba"	Big Idea	from Dance Dance Revolution Ultramix 2
"BALALAIKA, CARRIED WITH THE WIND"	Julie ann Frost	from Dance Dance Revolution Ultramix 2 from GuitarFreaks 6thMix & DrumMania 5thMix
"BLUE IMPULSE (for EXTREME)"	NAOKI feat. YUKI	from Dance Dance Revolution Extreme from beatmania IIDX 8th Style
"Brazilian Anthem"	Berimbau '66	from Dance Dance Revolution Ultramix 3 from GuitarFreaks 6thMix & DrumMania 5thMix
"DoLL"	TЁЯRA	from Dance Dance Revolution Strike from beatmania IIDX 10th Style
"Gamelan de Couple"	TOMOSUKE	from Dance Dance Revolution Extreme from Mambo a Go Go
"GORGEOUS 2012"	THE SURRENDERS	from Dance Dance Revolution Ultramix from Dance Maniax
"GRADUATION"	BeForU	from Dance Dance Revolution Extreme
"Hit 'n' Slap"	Asletics	from Dance Dance Revolution Ultramix 2 from beatmania THE FINAL
"iFUTURELIST (DDR VERSION)"	AKIRA YAMAOKA	from Dance Dance Revolution Strike from beatmania IIDX 13 DistorteD
"KI・SE・KI (DDR edit)"	BeForU	from DDR Festival Dance Dance Revolution from beatmania IIDX 11 IIDXRED
"Knock Out Regrets"	MAKI@TOGO. BAND	from Dance Dance Revolution Strike
"Love Is Dreaminess"	L.E.D.-G vs GUHROOVY fw/asuka	from Dance Dance Revolution Ultramix 2 from beatmania IIDX 5th Style (PS2)
"LOVE♥SHINE"	RIYU KOSAKA	from Dance Dance Revolution Extreme
"MATSURI (J-SUMMER MIX)"	RE-VENGE	from Dance Dance Revolution Ultramix from Dance Maniax 2ndMix
"MIDNIGHT SPECIAL"	Love machineguns	from Dance Dance Revolution Ultramix 2 from DrumMania 2ndMix
"Monkey Punk"	Big Idea	from Dance Dance Revolution Ultramix 2
"PUT YOUR FAITH IN ME (SATURDAY NIGHT MIX)"	UZI-LAY	from Dance Dance Revolution Ultramix from Dance Maniax
"The Least 100sec"	Hirofumi Sasaki	from Dance Dance Revolution Extreme from GuitarFreaks 5thMix & DrumMania 4thMix
Extra Stage songs (5 total)
"MAX 300 (Super-Max-Me Mix)"	Jondi & Spesh	from Dance Dance Revolution Ultramix 2 Extra Stage#1
"Healing-D-Vision"	DE-STRAD	from Dance Dance Revolution SuperNova; Extra Stage#2
"Fascination MAXX"	100-200-400	from Dance Dance Revolution SuperNova; Extra Stage#3
"Fascination -eternal love mix-"	2MB	from Dance Dance Revolution SuperNova; Extra Stage#4
"CHAOS"	DE-SIRE retunes	from Dance Dance Revolution SuperNova; Encore Extra Stage

==== Japan ====
Song	Artist	Note
Licensed songs (18 total)
"A LOVE LIKE THIS"	PANDORA	from Dancemania EX 5
"CENTERFOLD (130BPM move it remix)"	CAPTAIN JACK	from Dancemania EX 2
"DA CAPO"	ACE OF BASE	from Dancemania EX 6
"FEELS JUST LIKE IT SHOULD"	LH MUSIC CREATION	cover of Jamiroquai
"GIRL IN A DAYDREAM"	PANDORA	from Dancemania EX 6
"GIVE ME UP"	LH MUSIC CREATION	cover of Michael Fortunati
"GOLDEN SKY"	SMiLE.dk	from Dancemania EX 5
"I'll Make Love To You"	LH MUSIC CREATION	cover of Boyz II Men
"JERK IT OUT"	CAESARS	from Dancing Stage Unleashed from the album Love for the Streets
"La Bamba"	LH MUSIC CREATION	from Dance Dance Revolution SuperNova cover of a classic Mexican folk song
"LONG TRAIN RUNNIN'"	X-TREME	from Dancemania EX 2 cover of The Doobie Brothers
"LOVE AT FIRST SIGHT (TwinMasterplan Mix)"	KYLIE MINOGUE	from Dancemania EX 7
"MODERN GIRL"	SHEENA EASTON	from Dancemania CLASSICS
"MR.DABADA (Groove Wonder Remix)"	CARLOS JEAN	from Dancemania EX 4
"SURRENDER (YOUR LOVE)"	JAVINE	from the album Surrender
"TOXIC (FT Company Edit)"	HELEN	from Dancemania COVERS 01 cover of Britney Spears
"WHAT A WONDERFUL WORLD"	BEATBOX vs DJ MIKO	from Dancemania EX 1 cover of Louis Armstrong
"WOOKIE WOOKIE"	MACHOMAN	from Dancemania EX 9
New Konami Original songs (21 total)
"Baby's Tears"	MIKI ROBERTS	from Dance Dance Revolution SuperNova
"Baby's Tears (スカイガールズ・オープニングテーマ)" (Baby's Tears (SKY GIRLS opening theme))	小坂りゆ	New Konami Original; Opening theme of Sky Girls
"Feelings Won't Fade (Extend Trance Mix)"	SySF.	from Dance Dance Revolution SuperNova (NA PS2)
"Flow"	Scotty D. revisits U1	from Dance Dance Revolution SuperNova
"Flow (Jammin' Ragga Mix)"	Scotty D. revisits U1	from Dance Dance Revolution SuperNova (NA PS2)
"Flow (True Style)"	Scotty D. revisits U1	from Dance Dance Revolution SuperNova
"Fly away"	ChiyoTia	from Dance Dance Revolution SuperNova
"Fly away -mix del matador"	Shawn the Horny Master feat. ChiyoTia	from Dance Dance Revolution SuperNova (NA PS2)
"華爛漫 -Flowers-" (Hana Ranman -Flowers-)	TЁЯRA	from Dance Dance Revolution SuperNova
"HONEY♂PUNCH"	RIYU KOSAKA	from Dance Dance Revolution SuperNova
"INNOCENCE OF SILENCE"	nc ft. NRG Factory	from Dance Dance Revolution SuperNova
"MOONSTER"	kobo uniting Marsha & D.	New Konami Original
"Morning Glory"	BeForU	from Dance Dance Revolution SuperNova
"My Only Shining Star"	NAOKI feat. Becky Lucinda	from Dance Dance Revolution SuperNova
"PEACE(^^)v"	BeForU	from Dance Dance Revolution SuperNova
"SEDUCTION (Vocal Remix)"	NC feat. NRG Factory	from Dance Dance Revolution SuperNova
"Silver Platform -I wanna get your heart-"	U1 Reincarnates w/Leah	from Dance Dance Revolution SuperNova (NA PS2)
"SOUL CRASH"	nc ft. HARDCORE NATION	New Konami Original
"Star Gate Heaven"	SySF. feat. Donna Burke	from Dance Dance Revolution SuperNova
"Star Gate Heaven (FUTURE LOVE Mix)"	SySF. feat. Donna Burke	from Dance Dance Revolution SuperNova (NA PS2)
"TRUE♥LOVE"	jun	from Dance Dance Revolution SuperNova
New BEMANI Crossover songs (29 total)
"AA"	D.J.Amuro	from beatmania IIDX 11 IIDXRED
"cachaca"	Mokky de Yah Yah's	from GuitarFreaks 8thMix & DrumMania 7thMix
"CAN'T STOP FALLIN' IN LOVE -super euro version-"	NAOKI with Y&Co.	from Para Para Paradise
"CENTAUR"	Jimmy Weckl	from DrumMania 2ndMix
"チカラ" (Chikara)	BeForU	from GuitarFreaks 9thMix & DrumMania 8thMix
"CURUS"	D-crew	from pop'n music 12 いろは
"男々道" (Dandandou)	Des-ROW・組	from pop'n music 9
"Dragon Blade"	Kozo Nakamura	from GuitarFreaks 11thMix & DrumMania 10thMix
"Drivin'"	NAOKI feat. PAULA TERRY	from beatmania IIDX 8th Style
"DYNAMITE RAVE -super euro version-"	NAOKI with Y&Co.	from Para Para Paradise
"月光蝶" (Gekkōu Chōu)	あさき	from GuitarFreaks 9thMix & DrumMania 8thMix
"HAPPY☆ANGEL"	jun with TAHIRIH	from beatmania IIDX 12 HAPPY SKY
"Hunting for you"	Togo Project feat. Megu & Scotty D.	from beatmania 4thMix -the beat goes on-
"怒れる大きな白い馬" (Ikareru Ookina Shiroi Uma)	Morning Blue Dragon	from pop'n music 11
"カゲロウ" (Kagerōu)	Des-ROW・組スペシャルr	from pop'n music 11
"この子の七つのお祝いに" (Kono ko no Nanatsu no Oiwai ni)	あさき	from GuitarFreaks 10thMix & DrumMania 9thMix
"MONDO STREET"	Orange Lounge	from DrumMania 2ndMix
"MOON"	dj TAKA feat. Erika	from pop'n music 13 カーニバル
"夢幻ノ光" (Mugen no Hikari)	TЁЯRA	from pop'n music 12 いろは
"murmur twins"	yu_tokiwa.djw	from beatmania IIDX 8th Style
"虹色" (Nijiiro)	DJ YOSHITAKA feat G.S.C license	from pop'n music 13 カーニバル
"No.13"	TAKA respect for J.S.B	from beatmania IIDX 10th Style
"Quick Master"	act deft	from pop'n music
"rainbow rainbow"	Ryu☆	from beatmania IIDX 10th Style
"RED ZONE"	Tatsh&NAOKI	from beatmania IIDX 11 IIDXRED
"Ska Ska No.3"	亜熱帯マジ-SKA爆弾	from pop'n music 6
"TIERRA BUENA"	WILMA DE OLIVEIRA	from GuitarFreaks 9thMix & DrumMania 8thMix
"Under the Sky"	南さやか (BeForU) with platoniX	from beatmania IIDX 12 HAPPY SKY
"Xepher"	Tatsh	from beatmania IIDX 12 HAPPY SKY
New From Console Version songs (11 total)
"BALALAIKA, CARRIED WITH THE WIND"	Julie ann Frost	from Dance Dance Revolution Ultramix 2 from GuitarFreaks 6thMix & DrumMania 5thMix
"BALLAD FOR YOU ~想いの雨~" (BALLAD FOR YOU ~Omoi no Ame~)	NM feat. Thomas Howard	from Dance Dance Revolution Ultramix from beatmania IIDX 6th Style
"Brazilian Anthem"	Berimbau '66	from Dance Dance Revolution Ultramix 3 from GuitarFreaks 6thMix & DrumMania 5thMix
"BRILLIANT R・E・D"	NAOKI feat. TAHIRIH WALKER	from Dance Dance Revolution Ultramix 3
"GORGEOUS 2012"	THE SURRENDERS	from Dance Dance Revolution Ultramix from Dance Maniax
"ヒマワリ" (Himawari)	RIYU from BeForU	from Dance Dance Revolution Ultramix 3 from GuitarFreaks 10thMix & DrumMania 9thMix
"INSERTiON (Machine Gun Kelly Mix)"	Thuggie D.	from Dance Dance Revolution Ultramix
"KEEP ON MOVIN' (DMX MIX)"	N.M.R.-typeG	from Dance Dance Revolution Ultramix from Dance Maniax
"祭 (J-SUMMER MIX)" (Matsuri (J-SUMMER MIX))	RE-VENGE	from Dance Dance Revolution Ultramix from Dance Maniax 2ndMix
"PUT YOUR FAITH IN ME (SATURDAY NIGHT MIX)"	UZI-LAY	from Dance Dance Revolution Ultramix from Dance Maniax
"rainbow flyer"	dj TAKA	from Dance Dance Revolution Ultramix 3 from beatmania IIDX 8th Style
Extra Stage songs (5 total)
"Trim"	kobo	from Dance Dance Revolution SuperNova (NA PS2); Extra Stage#1
"Healing-D-Vision"	DE-STRAD	from Dance Dance Revolution SuperNova; Extra Stage#2
"Fascination MAXX"	100-200-400	from Dance Dance Revolution SuperNova; Extra Stage#3
"Fascination -eternal love mix-"	2MB	from Dance Dance Revolution SuperNova; Extra Stage#4
"CHAOS"	DE-SIRE retunes	from Dance Dance Revolution SuperNova; Encore Extra Stage

==== Europe ====
Song	Artist	Note
Licensed songs (10 total)
"All The Things She Said"	t.A.T.u.	from the album 200 km/h in the Wrong Lane
"Biology"	Girls Aloud	from the album Chemistry
"Bruised"	Sugababes	from the album Taller in More Ways
"Hey Boy, Hey Girl"	The Chemical Brothers	from the album Surrender
"Hoodie"	Lady Sovereign	from the album Public Warning
"Jacques Your Body (Make Me Sweat)"	Les Rhythmes Digitales	from the album Darkdancer
"Right Here, Right Now"	Fatboy Slim	from the album You've Come a Long Way, Baby
"Romeo"	Basement Jaxx	from the album Rooty
"Supersonic"	Jamiroquai	from the album Synkronized
"Take On Me"	A-ha	from the album Hunting High and Low
New Konami Original songs (15 total)
"Baby's Tears"	MIKI ROBERTS	from Dance Dance Revolution SuperNova
"Feelings Won't Fade (Extend Trance Mix)"	SySF.	from Dance Dance Revolution SuperNova (NA PS2)
"Flow (Jammin' Ragga Mix)"	Scotty D. revisits U1	from Dance Dance Revolution SuperNova (NA PS2)
"Flow (True Style)"	Scotty D. revisits U1	from Dance Dance Revolution SuperNova
"Fly away"	ChiyoTia	from Dance Dance Revolution SuperNova
"Fly away -mix del matador"	Shawn the Horny Master feat. ChiyoTia	from Dance Dance Revolution SuperNova (NA PS2)
"HONEY♂PUNCH"	RIYU KOSAKA	from Dance Dance Revolution SuperNova
"INNOCENCE OF SILENCE"	nc ft. NRG Factory	from Dance Dance Revolution SuperNova
"My Only Shining Star"	NAOKI feat. Becky Lucinda	from Dance Dance Revolution SuperNova
"PEACE(^^)v"	BeForU	from Dance Dance Revolution SuperNova
"Silver Platform -I wanna get your heart-"	U1 Reincarnates w/Leah	from Dance Dance Revolution SuperNova (NA PS2)
"Star Gate Heaven"	SySF. feat. Donna Burke	from Dance Dance Revolution SuperNova
"Star Gate Heaven (FUTURE LOVE Mix)"	SySF. feat. Donna Burke	from Dance Dance Revolution SuperNova (NA PS2)
"Trim"	kobo	from Dance Dance Revolution SuperNova (NA PS2)
"TRUE♥LOVE"	jun	from Dance Dance Revolution SuperNova
New BEMANI Crossover songs (20 total)
"AA"	D.J.Amuro	from beatmania IIDX 11 IIDXRED
"CAN'T STOP FALLIN' IN LOVE -super euro version-"	NAOKI with Y&Co.	from Para Para Paradise
"CENTAUR"	Jimmy Weckl	from DrumMania 2ndMix
"CURUS"	D-crew	from pop'n music 12 いろは
"DYNAMITE RAVE -super euro version-"	NAOKI with Y&Co.	from Para Para Paradise
"Gekkou chou"	Asaki	from GuitarFreaks 9thMix & DrumMania 8thMix
"HAPPY☆ANGEL"	jun	from beatmania IIDX 12 HAPPY SKY
"KAGEROW (Dragonfly)"	Des-ROW・UNITED special+r	from pop'n music 11
"MOON"	dj TAKA feat. Erika	from pop'n music 13 カーニバル
"Mugen"	TЁЯRA	from pop'n music 12 いろは
"murmur twins"	Yu_tokiwa.djw	from beatmania IIDX 8th Style
"NIJIIRO"	DJ YOSHITAKA feat G.S.C. license	from pop'n music 13 カーニバル
"No.13"	TAKA respect for J.S.B	from beatmania IIDX 10th Style
"Quick Master"	act deft	from pop'n music
"rainbow rainbow"	Ryu☆	from beatmania IIDX 10th Style
"RED ZONE"	Tatsh&NAOKI	from beatmania IIDX 11 IIDXRED
"Ska Ska No.3"	ANETTAI MAJI-SKA BAKUDAN	from pop'n music 6
"TIERRA BUENA"	WILMA DE OLIVEIRA	from GuitarFreaks 9thMix & DrumMania 8thMix
"Tino's White Horse"	Morning Blue Dragon	from pop'n music 11
"Xepher"	Tatsh	from beatmania IIDX 12 HAPPY SKY
Returning Konami Original songs (19 total)
"Baile Le Samba"	Big Idea	from Dance Dance Revolution Ultramix 2
"BALALAIKA, CARRIED WITH THE WIND"	Julie ann Frost	from Dance Dance Revolution Ultramix 2 from GuitarFreaks 6thMix & DrumMania 5thMix
"BLUE IMPULSE (for EXTREME)"	NAOKI feat. YUKI	from Dance Dance Revolution Extreme from beatmania IIDX 8th Style
"Brazilian Anthem"	Berimbau '66	from Dance Dance Revolution Ultramix 3 from GuitarFreaks 6thMix & DrumMania 5thMix
"DoLL"	TЁЯRA	from Dance Dance Revolution Strike from beatmania IIDX 10th Style
"Gamelan de Couple"	TOMOSUKE	from Dance Dance Revolution Extreme from Mambo a Go Go
"GORGEOUS 2012"	THE SURRENDERS	from Dance Dance Revolution Ultramix from Dance Maniax
"GRADUATION"	BeForU	from Dance Dance Revolution Extreme
"Hit 'n' Slap"	Asletics	from Dance Dance Revolution Ultramix 2 from beatmania THE FINAL
"iFUTURELIST (DDR VERSION)"	AKIRA YAMAOKA	from Dance Dance Revolution Strike from beatmania IIDX 13 DistorteD
"KI・SE・KI (DDR edit)"	BeForU	from DDR Festival Dance Dance Revolution from beatmania IIDX 11 IIDXRED
"Knock Out Regrets"	MAKI@TOGO. BAND	from Dance Dance Revolution Strike
"Love Is Dreaminess"	L.E.D.-G vs GUHROOVY fw/asuka	from Dance Dance Revolution Ultramix 2 from beatmania IIDX 5th Style (PS2)
"LOVE♥SHINE"	RIYU KOSAKA	from Dance Dance Revolution Extreme
"MATSURI (J-SUMMER MIX)"	RE-VENGE	from Dance Dance Revolution Ultramix from Dance Maniax 2ndMix
"MIDNIGHT SPECIAL"	Love machineguns	from Dance Dance Revolution Ultramix 2 from DrumMania 2ndMix
"Monkey Punk"	Big Idea	from Dance Dance Revolution Ultramix 2
"PUT YOUR FAITH IN ME (SATURDAY NIGHT MIX)"	UZI-LAY	from Dance Dance Revolution Ultramix from Dance Maniax
"The Least 100sec"	Hirofumi Sasaki	from Dance Dance Revolution Extreme from GuitarFreaks 5thMix & DrumMania 4thMix
Extra Stage songs (5 total)
"MAX 300 (Super-Max-Me Mix)"	Jondi & Spesh	from Dance Dance Revolution Ultramix 2 Extra Stage#1
"Healing-D-Vision"	DE-STRAD	from Dance Dance Revolution SuperNova; Extra Stage#2
"Fascination MAXX"	100-200-400	from Dance Dance Revolution SuperNova; Extra Stage#3
"Fascination -eternal love mix-"	2MB	from Dance Dance Revolution SuperNova; Extra Stage#4
"CHAOS"	DE-SIRE retunes	from Dance Dance Revolution SuperNova; Encore Extra Stage
