= Dance Dance Revolution X2 =

2010 video game

- Japanese flyer for Dance Dance Revolution X2
- Developers: Konami, Bemani
- Publisher: Konami
- Series: Dance Dance Revolution
- Platform: Arcade
- Release: Arcade: JP/AS: July 7, 2010; NA: December 31, 2010 (see release history); EU: May 13, 2011
- Genres: Music, exercise
- Modes: Single-player, multiplayer
- Arcade system: Bemani PC Type 4 (Windows XP Embedded)

Dance Dance Revolution X2 (ダンスダンスレボリューションX2, Dansu Dansu Reboryūshon Ekkusu Tsū) (DDR X2) is a music video game, and a part of the Dance Dance Revolution series. The arcade version of DDR X2 was revealed by Konami on November 20, 2009. The sequel to Dance Dance Revolution X, X2 began public beta testing on November 25, 2009. The game was released in Japan and Asia on July 7, 2010, North America on December 31, 2010, and Europe on May 13, 2011. It was the last arcade installment of Dance Dance Revolution with international releases until Dance Dance Revolution A.

== Development ==
The first public location test for Dance Dance Revolution X2 was announced by Konami on November 20, 2009, to be held from November 25 to December 3, 2009, in Akihabara, Tokyo. The location test revealed new features such as a redesigned song selection interface, new adjustable versions of the Sudden and Hidden modifiers, and the ability to adjust these settings and the speed of the arrows in-game using the control buttons on the cabinet. The location test version did not contain an Extra Stage song, but "POSSESSION" was accessible on the build if certain conditions were met.

== Features ==
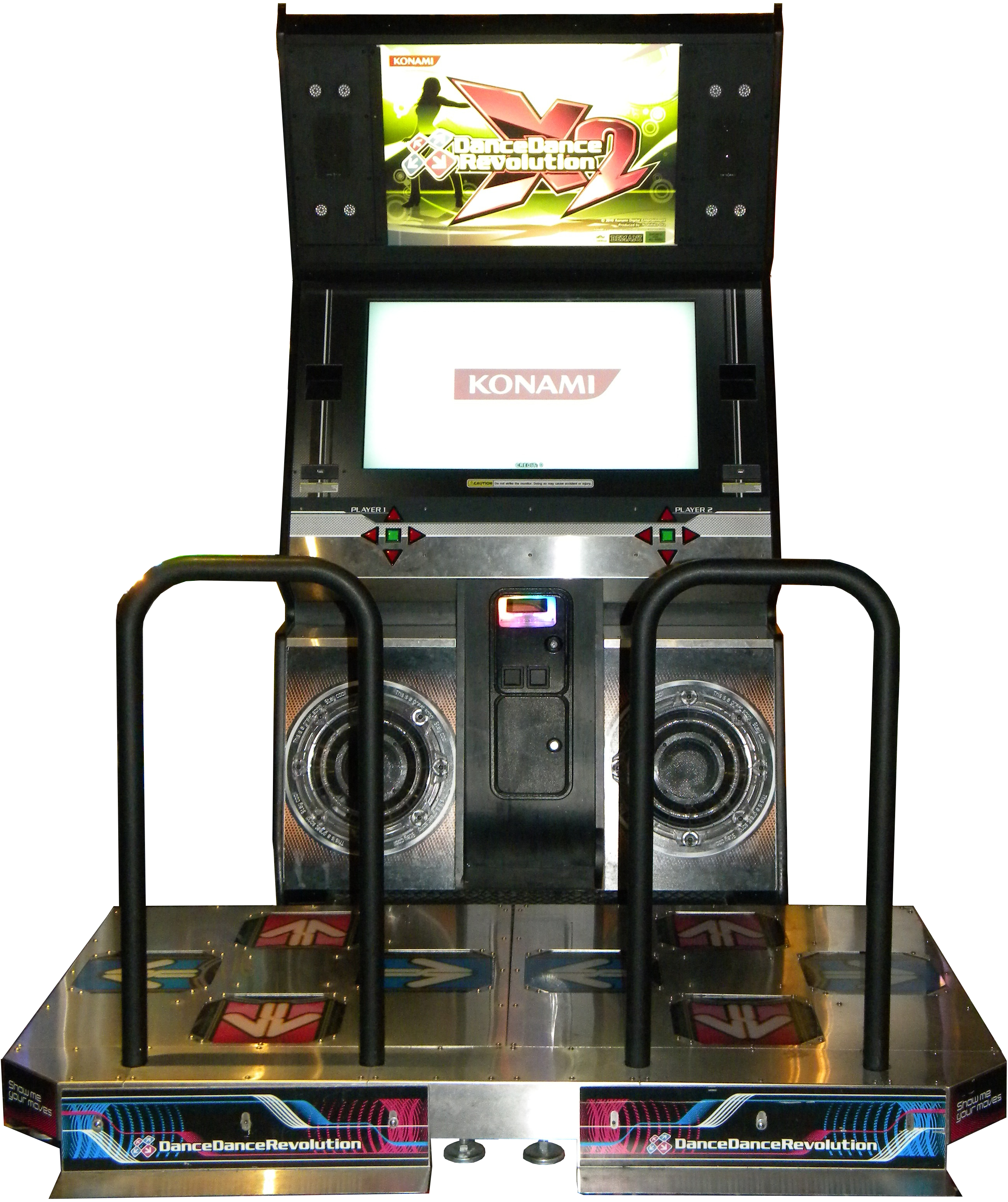
DDR X2 arcade cabinet in Canada

- A redesigned Cover Flow-like song list. This design is based on DDR Universe 3.
- New "Happy" and "Pro" play modes. Happy mode is designed for beginners, with a simplified interface and reduced song list. Pro is basically the "normal" mode.
- Two new options have been added. The first are HIDDEN+ and SUDDEN+, which are alternate versions of HIDDEN and SUDDEN that can be activated using the up and down buttons on the cabinet. The second is the RISKY option, which gives the player one life bar (like in ENCORE EXTRA STAGE); it is only available when playing SINGLE or DOUBLE mode. If the player missteps, the stage will end and skip to the next stage. This is useful for the players who want to achieve higher scores. In addition, SPEED can also be adjusted using the up and down buttons on the cabinet.
- PASELI digital payment system
  - MARATHON MODE, exclusive for PASELI owners. Players can play up to 7 stages using the PASELI e-money system. Certain CHALLENGE charts for songs are also only available in this mode.
- BATTLE MODE has been removed from the game.
- Step Rating BOO is renamed back to MISS and merged with N.G. ALMOST have been removed entirely (its window has been merged with GOOD)

A total of 17 characters are available in X2, featuring new costumes. Two characters, Rena and Rinon, make their first arcade appearance. The other 15 characters are from DDR X. Rinon can appear in one of seven colors by selecting the Replicant-D Action folder. In X2 and subsequent releases, the character selection screen and accessories are only accessible on the e-Amusement website. The game defaults to selecting a random character when choosing a song.

== Extra Stage ==
=== Extra Stage ===
The Extra Stage system in this game has been changed. The player must obtain performance grade of AA or AAA from the First Stage to a Final Stage to reach Extra Stage. There are no longer songs exclusive to Final Stage that are required to access Extra Stage as with previous versions. The special song available in Extra Stage is KIMONO PRINCESS, but the difficulty ratings of the chart is based on the sum of difficulty ratings and the number of stages on the credit. The list is as follows.

Quantity of stages	Beginner	Beginner, Basic	Beginner, Basic, Difficult	Beginner, Basic, Difficult, Expert
2	1 (2 x 0 + 1) to 12 (2 x 6)	13 (2 x 6 + 1) to 18 (2 x 9)	19 (2 x 9 + 1) to 26 (2 x 13)	27 (2 x 13 + 1) to 38 (2 x 19)
3	1 (3 x 0 + 1) to 18 (3 x 6)	19 (3 x 6 + 1) to 27 (3 x 9)	28 (3 x 9 + 1) to 39 (3 x 13)	40 (3 x 13 + 1) to 57 (3 x 19)
4	1 (4 x 0 + 1) to 24 (4 x 6)	25 (4 x 6 + 1) to 36 (4 x 9)	37 (4 x 9 + 1) to 52 (4 x 13)	53 (4 x 13 + 1) to 76 (4 x 19)
5	1 (5 x 0 + 1) to 30 (5 x 6)	31 (5 x 6 + 1) to 45 (5 x 9)	46 (5 x 9 + 1) to 65 (5 x 13)	66 (5 x 13 + 1) to 95 (5 x 19)

The Extra Stage uses Battery Dance Meter; its quantity of lives is 4. The players can choose options for Extra Stage.

=== Encore Extra Stage ===
To access Encore Extra Stage, the player needs to get AA or better on KIMONO PRINCESS on Expert during Extra Stage. Unlike previous version where the players may choose any song, Encore Extra Stages have been reverted to the style in DDR MAX, where only a specific song can be played. The song is (by default) Roppongi EVOLVED on Expert. The version of the song is chosen randomly. Players are still able to set options before challenging Encore Extra Stage.

=== Replicant D-Action ===
For Replicant D-Action, each song has different requirements to access.

- Pierce The Sky is accessed by passing at least 20 songs in the X2 folder.
- Sakura Sunrise is accessed by passing at least 2 songs in each song folder (at least 24 songs).
- Shiny World is accessed by passing 6 courses and 1 drill course.
- POSSESSION is accessed by getting at least 100 difficulty ratings on CHALLENGE difficulty, and scoring AA or better on Pierce The Sky and Sakura Sunrise on the same difficulty.
- New Decade is accessed by getting a full combo on 15 different song charts (same songs can have multiple full combos on separate difficulties), and scoring AA or better on Sakura Sunrise and Shiny World on the same difficulty.
- Anti-Matter is accessed by playing Trial Mode 3 times, and scoring AA or better on Pierce The Sky and Shiny World on the same difficulty. (Note that POSSESSION, New Decade, and Anti-Matter's difficulty depends on what difficulties the player plays on previous songs).

Scoring AA or better on each song will net a medal.

When the player subsequently earns all six, the player immediately will access the special Encore Extra Stage, Valkyrie dimension on Expert. The player is forced to play the song immediately, which means they cannot change options or take a break.

== Release ==
Dance Dance Revolution X2 was released on December 31, 2010 in the United States. Internationally, Dance Dance Revolution X2 was imported in Canada on December 5, 2011 at the Funhaven amusement centre in Ottawa, Ontario. As of August 2019, this is the sole venue in Canada to feature this game, after a competitor withdrew an upgraded machine.

New cabinets, and Dance Dance Revolution X upgrades, feature a 37" monitor at 720p. Legacy cabinets, initially running SuperNova 2 or an older release, feature a 29" monitor at 480p.

== Music ==
There are 83 new songs featured in X2 (81 new songs in the North American and European releases). 17 out of 19 licensed songs from Dance Dance Revolution SuperNova and 10 out of 13 from Dance Dance Revolution SuperNova 2 have been removed due to their licenses expiring. The licensed material from Dance Dance Revolution X remains, including tracks from the Dancemania compilation series, as well as A Different Drum records. Four classic licensed songs from earlier DDR mixes have also returned in remastered form, along with a special remixed license track. The first location test build contained 14 new songs, plus one secret song, POSSESSION, which had special conditions required in order to be unlocked. Three additional songs were added on an updated build installed several days after the testing began.

In the 2010 Japanese Arcade Operators Union expo (AOU2010), Konami showed a newer build of the game. This newer version showcased even more new songs, including additional material from other BEMANI music games.

The final release of the build revealed many new unlocks, special remixes by Konami artists, and song revivals. The licenses include selections by well known Japanese and Western artists. This the very first DDR arcade release to include licenses from the Cyber Trance series of albums. It is also the first time that Super Eurobeat tracks have been featured in a DDR game since Dancing Stage featuring Disney's Rave. Other songs have been ported over from the latest PlayStation 2, Wii, and Xbox 360 DDR releases. There are a total of 444 songs in this game (442 songs in the North American and European releases).

A total of four songs, all which debuted in Dance Dance Revolution Hottest Party 3 for the Wii, are exclusive to Dance Dance Revolution X2 in arcades:

- "Bonafied Lovin" by Chromeo
- "Daft Punk Is Playing at My House" by LCD Soundsystem 💿
- "Feel Good Inc." by Gorillaz
- "Ice Ice Baby" by Vanilla Ice 💿

In addition, a total of 16 songs are exclusive to Dance Dance Revolution X and X2 in arcades.

One of the new features included in the main game mode is a special Extra Stage system. Known as Replicant D-Action, this mode allows players to choose from a set of 6 difficult songs, 3 level 14's (slower songs) and 3 level 17's (faster + tempo change songs). When a player gets rank AA or more one of these songs (any difficulty), they receive a medal for that particular track. When players subsequently earn all 6 medals, they can access the Encore Extra Stage, Valkyrie dimension (Expert). Valkyrie dimension is known as the first song in the series that is harder than the Extra Stage despite the latter having one life, let alone the most difficult song in the entire series.

On March 23, 2011, Konami introduced a special promotion called APPEND Festival. This allowed players to unlock 2 special songs for 5 BEMANI games, including DDR X2 and the recently released upgrade version of jubeat knit, jubeat knit APPEND. However, these songs are not available in the North American and European versions of the game due to the lack of e-Amusement in those regions.

The PlayStation 2 version of Dance Dance Revolution X2 was released in 2009, prior to the arcade version. It includes 60 songs, including 19 which made their arcade debut in X2. Another 25 songs originate from older releases, but are also available in X2 for the arcade, for a total of 44 common songs in both versions of X2. The remaining 16 songs are console exclusives.

Dance Dance Revolution X2 arcade song list
Song	Artist	Other Information
Licensed Songs (21 total)
"Be your wings" 🎬	GIRL NEXT DOOR	from the album Next Future
"Bonafied Lovin'" 🎬	Chromeo	from Dance Dance Revolution Hottest Party 3 from the album Fancy Footwork
"CAPTAIN JACK (GRANDALE REMIX)"	CAPTAIN JACK	from Dancemania SPEED 2 original cut from Dance Dance Revolution 3rdMix
"DAFT PUNK IS PLAYING AT MY HOUSE" 🎬 💿	LCD Soundsystem	from the album LCD Soundsystem
"DAM DARIRAM"	JOGA	from Dancemania X3 original cut from Dance Dance Revolution 3rdMix
"ETERNITY"	ALEKY	from Super Eurobeat Vol. 199
"Everytime We Touch" 🎬	Cascada	from Dance Dance Revolution Universe from the album Everytime We Touch
"EZ DO DANCE" 🎬	TRF	from the album EZ DO DANCE
"Feel Good Inc." 🎬	Gorillaz	from Dance Dance Revolution Hottest Party 3 from the album Demon Days
"HERO"	PAPAYA	from Dance Dance Revolution X (NA PS2) from Dancemania EXTRA original cut from Dance Dance Revolution 2ndMix
"Hide-away" 🎬	AAA	from the album Heartful
"ICE ICE BABY" 💿	VANILLA ICE	from the album To the Extreme
"IF YOU WERE HERE"	JENNIFER	from Dancemania EXTRA original cut from Dance Dance Revolution 2ndMix
"IF YOU WERE HERE(L.E.D.-G STYLE REMIX)" 🔒	JENNIFER	Exclusive remix
"more more more"	capsule	from jubeat ripples from the album More! More! More!
"only my railgun" 🎬	fripSide	from the album Infinite Synthesis; Opening theme of とある科学の超電磁砲
"resonance"	NAOKI-EX	from Dance Dance Revolution Furu Furu Party (JP Wii) cover of the opening theme of ソウルイーター
"Super Driver" 🎬	平野綾	from the album Speed Star; Opening theme of 涼宮ハルヒの憂鬱
"SUPER EUROBEAT <GOLD MIX>"	DAVE RODGERS feat. FUTURA	from SUPER EUROBEAT VOL.201 - COLLABORATION OF EUROBEAT
"TENSHI" 🎬	GOURYELLA	
"Time After Time" 🎬	Novaspace	from the album Supernova cover of Cyndi Lauper
Konami Original Songs (10 total)
"All My Love" 🎬 (BG) 🔒	kors k feat.ЯIRE	New Konami Original
"CG Project" 🔒	Latenighters	New Konami Original
"Decade" 🎬 (BG) 🔒	kors k VS. dj TAKA	New Konami Original
"KISS KISS KISS 秋葉工房 MIX" (KISS KISS KISS Akiba Kōubōu MIX) 🎬 (BG) 🔒	Remixed by DJ Command	New Konami Original
"Poseidon (kors k mix)" 🎬 (BG) 🔒	NAOKI Underground	New Konami Original
"☆shining☆" 🎬 (BG)	ピンクターボ	New Konami Original
"Sky Is The Limit" 🎬 (BG) 🔒	Sota F. feat. ANNA	New Konami Original
"someday..." 🎬 (BG)	杏野はるな	New Konami Original
"Theory of Eternity" 🔒	TAG	New Konami Original
"WH1TE RO5E" 🎬 (BG) 🔒	Y&Co.	New Konami Original
From Console Version (25 total)
"888" 🔒	DJ TECHNORCH	from Dance Dance Revolution Universe 3
"A Brighter Day"	NAOKI feat. Aleisha G.	from Dance Dance Revolution S+
"aftershock!!" 🔒	DM Ashura	from Dance Dance Revolution Universe 3
"Crazy Control" 🔒 💿	D-crew with VAL TIATIA	
"ΔMAX" 🎬	DM Ashura	from Dance Dance Revolution Universe 3
"dirty digital" 🔒	kors k	from Dance Dance Revolution Universe 3
"Dummy" 🔒	RAM	from Dance Dance Revolution Universe 3
"Freeze" 🔒 💿	nc ft. NRG Factory	
"Gotta Dance" 🔒 💿	NAOKI feat. Aleisha G	
"Heatstroke" 💿	TAG feat. Angie Lee	
"in love wit you" 🔒	Kotaro feat. Aya	from Dance Dance Revolution X (JP PS2)
"La libertad" 🔒 💿	Cherryl Horrocks	
"La receta" 🔒 💿	Carlos Coco Garcia	
"Love Again" 🔒 💿	NM feat. Mr. E	
"oarfish"	kors k	from Dance Dance Revolution Universe 3
"Pluto The First" 🔒 💿	WHITE WALL	from Dance Dance Revolution Hottest Party (JP Wii)
"real-high-SPEED" 🔒	Makoto feat. SK	from Dance Dance Revolution X (JP PS2)
"Sacred Oath" 💿	TЁЯRA	
"sakura storm" 🎬 (BG)	Ryu☆	from Dance Dance Revolution Universe 3
"Shine" 💿	TOMOSUKE feat. Adreana	
"Taking It To The Sky" 🔒 💿	U1 feat. Tammy S Hansen	
"THIS NIGHT" 🔒 💿	jun feat. Sonnet	
"What Will Come Of Me" 🔒 💿	Black Rose Garden	
"You Are A Star" 💿	NAOKI feat. Anna Kaelin	
"Your Angel" 🔒	DM Ashura feat. kors k	from Dance Dance Revolution Universe 3
BEMANI Crossover Songs (18 total)
"BALLAD THE FEATHERS" 🎬 (BG)	SHIN SOUND DESIGN feat. Naomi Koizumi	from beatmania IIDX 13 DistorteD
"Dazzlin' Darlin" 🎬	HHH	from beatmania IIDX 15 DJ TROOPERS
"Dazzlin' Darlin-秋葉工房 mix-" (Dazzlin' Darlin-Akiba Kōubōu mix-) 🔒	Remixed by DJ Command	from beatmania IIDX 17 SIRIUS
"DROP" 🎬 🔒	dj TAKA feat. Kanako Hoshino	from beatmania IIDX 17 SIRIUS
"FIRE FIRE" 🎬 (BG) 🔒	StripE	from beatmania IIDX 14 GOLD
"不沈艦 CANDY" (Fuchinkan CANDY) 🎬 (BG)	Risk Junk	from beatmania IIDX 16 EMPRESS
"going up" 🎬 🔒	colors	from GuitarFreaks V & DrumMania V
"GOLD RUSH" 🎬 🔒	DJ YOSHITAKA-G feat. Michael a la mode	from beatmania IIDX 14 GOLD
"I'm so Happy"	Ryu☆	from jubeat knit
"Leaving..." 🎬 (BG)	seiya-murai meets "eimy"	from beatmania IIDX 13 DistorteD
"MAX LOVE"	DJ Yoshitaka feat. 星野奏子	from beatmania IIDX 15 DJ TROOPERS
"冥" (Mei) 🎬 (BG) 🔒	Amuro vs. Killer	from beatmania IIDX 12 HAPPY SKY
"Melody Life"	Noria	from beatmania IIDX 13 DistorteD
"Second Heaven" 🎬 (BG)	Ryu☆	from beatmania IIDX 14 GOLD
"She is my wife" 🎬	SUPER STAR 満-MITSURU-	from beatmania IIDX 17 SIRIUS
"smooooch ・∀・" 🎬	kors k	from beatmania IIDX 16 EMPRESS
"VANESSA" 🎬 (BG) 🔒	朱雀	from beatmania IIDX 14 GOLD
"ZETA ~素数の世界と超越者~" (ZETA ~Sosūu no Sekai to Chōuetsusha~) 🎬 (BG) 🔒	Zektbach	from pop'n music 15 ADVENTURE
Boss Songs (2 total)
"KIMONO PRINCESS" 🎬 (BG) 🔒 💿	jun	Accessible as EXTRA STAGE
"roppongi EVOLVED" 🎬 (BG) 💿 🔒	TAG underground	Versions A, B, C and D available Version D: New Konami Original; Accessible as ENCORE EXTRA STAGE
Replicant D-Action Songs (7 total)
"Pierce the Sky" 🎬 (BG) 🔒	JAKAZiD feat. K.N.	New Konami Original; Accessible as EXTRA STAGE#1
"Sakura Sunrise" 🎬 (BG) 🔒	Ryu☆	New Konami Original; Accessible as EXTRA STAGE#2
"Shiny World" 🎬 (BG) 🔒	CAPACITY GATE	New Konami Original; Accessible as EXTRA STAGE#3
"New Decade" 🎬 (BG) 🔒	Sota F.	New Konami Original; Accessible as EXTRA STAGE#4
"Anti-Matter" 🎬 (BG) 🔒	Orbit1 & Milo	New Konami Original; Accessible as EXTRA STAGE#5
"POSSESSION" 🎬 (BG) 🔒	TAG underground	New Konami Original; Accessible as EXTRA STAGE#6
"Valkyrie dimension" 🎬 (BG) 🔒	Spriggan	New Konami Original; Accessible as ENCORE EXTRA STAGE
Newly Revived Songs (9 total)
"Freedom" 🔒	BeForU	from Dance Dance Revolution SuperNova
"ヒマワリ" (Himawari) 🔒	RIYU from BeForU	from Dance Dance Revolution SuperNova
"Under the Sky" 🔒	南さやか(BeForU) with platoniX	from Dance Dance Revolution SuperNova
"GRADUATION ～それぞれの明日～ " (GRADUATION ~Sorezore no Ashita) 🔒	BeForU	from Dance Dance Revolution Extreme
"LOVE♥SHINE" 🔒	小坂りゆ	from Dance Dance Revolution Extreme
"♥LOVE²シュガ→♥" (♥LOVE² Sugar→♥)	dj TAKA feat. のりあ	from Dance Dance Revolution Extreme
"TEARS" 🔒	NAOKI underground feat. EK	from Dance Dance Revolution Extreme
"BREAK DOWN!" 🔒	BeForU	from DDRMAX2 Dance Dance Revolution 7thMix
"CANDY♥" 🔒	小坂りゆ	from DDRMAX2 Dance Dance Revolution 7thMix
Removed Songs (39 total)
"HOW TO PLAY"	MC X	from Dance Dance Revolution X
"Xmix1 (Midnight Dawn)"	dj jiggens	from Dance Dance Revolution X
"Xmix2 (Beats 'n Bangs)"	DJ Inhabit	from Dance Dance Revolution X
"Xmix3 (Stomp Dem Groove)"	DJ nagi	from Dance Dance Revolution X
"Xmix4 (Linear Momentum)"	dj jiggens	from Dance Dance Revolution X
"Xmix5 (Overcrush)"	DJ Inhabit	from Dance Dance Revolution X
"AIN'T NO MOUNTAIN HIGH ENOUGH"	SLOTH MUSIC PROJECT feat. MALAYA	from Dance Dance Revolution SuperNova 2
"Burn Baby Burn"	SLOTH MUSIC PROJECT feat. ANDY L.	from Dance Dance Revolution SuperNova 2
"COME CLEAN"	NM featuring Susan Z	from Dance Dance Revolution SuperNova 2
"FAINT"	PEGASUS	from Dance Dance Revolution SuperNova 2
"ME AGAINST THE MUSIC"	HELEN	from Dance Dance Revolution SuperNova 2
"My Favorite Things"	SLOTH MUSIC PROJECT feat. ALISON WADE	from Dance Dance Revolution SuperNova 2
"SUNRISE (JASON NEVINS REMIX)"	DURAN DURAN	from Dance Dance Revolution SuperNova 2
"TWO MONTHS OFF"	TECHNO MASTERS	from Dance Dance Revolution SuperNova 2
"Unbelievable"	EMF	from Dance Dance Revolution SuperNova 2
"WAITING FOR TONIGHT"	P.A.T	from Dance Dance Revolution SuperNova 2
"A LOVE LIKE THIS"	PANDORA	from Dance Dance Revolution SuperNova
"CENTERFOLD (130BPM move it remix)"	CAPTAIN JACK	from Dance Dance Revolution SuperNova
"DA CAPO"	ACE OF BASE	from Dance Dance Revolution SuperNova
"DOESN'T REALLY MATTER"	JANET JACKSON	from Dance Dance Revolution SuperNova
"DYNAMITE RAVE -super euro version-" †	NAOKI with Y&Co.	from Dance Dance Revolution SuperNova
"FEELS JUST LIKE IT SHOULD"	LH MUSIC CREATION	from Dance Dance Revolution SuperNova
"GIRL IN A DAYDREAM"	PANDORA	from Dance Dance Revolution SuperNova
"GIVE ME UP"	LH MUSIC CREATION	from Dance Dance Revolution SuperNova
"I'll Make Love To You"	LH MUSIC CREATION	from Dance Dance Revolution SuperNova
"JERK IT OUT"	CAESARS	from Dance Dance Revolution SuperNova
"LONG TRAIN RUNNIN'"	X-TREME	from Dance Dance Revolution SuperNova
"LOVE AT FIRST SIGHT (TwinMasterplan Mix)"	KYLIE MINOGUE	from Dance Dance Revolution SuperNova
"MODERN GIRL"	SHEENA EASTON	from Dance Dance Revolution SuperNova
"MR. DABADA (Groove Wonder remix)"	CARLOS JEAN	from Dance Dance Revolution SuperNova
"SURRENDER (YOUR LOVE)"	JAVINE	from Dance Dance Revolution SuperNova
"TOXIC (FT company Edit)"	HELEN	from Dance Dance Revolution SuperNova
"WHAT A WONDERFUL WORLD"	BEATBOX vs DJ MIKO	from Dance Dance Revolution SuperNova
"WOOKIE WOOKIE"	MACHOMAN	from Dance Dance Revolution SuperNova
"DYNAMITE RAVE (Down Bird SOTA Mix)" †	NAOKI	from Dance Dance Revolution Extreme
"DYNAMITE RAVE (B4 ZA BEAT MIX)" †	NAOKI	from DDRMAX2 Dance Dance Revolution 7thMix
"true... (radio edit)"	小坂りゆ	from DDRMAX Dance Dance Revolution 6thMix
"true... (Trance Sunrise Mix)"	小坂りゆ	from DDRMAX Dance Dance Revolution 6thMix
"END OF THE CENTURY" †	NO.9	from Dance Dance Revolution 3rdMix
Absent outside of Asia (2 total)
"I'm so Happy"	Ryu☆	from Dance Dance Revolution X2
"Theory of Eternity"	TAG	from Dance Dance Revolution X2

Dance Dance Revolution X2 PlayStation 2 song list
Song	Artist	Note
Console exclusive licenses (13 total)
"Closer" 🎬	Ne-Yo	from the album Year of the Gentleman
"Disturbia"	Rihanna	from the album Good Girl Gone Bad: Reloaded
"Do You Know (The Ping Pong Song)" 🎬	Enrique Iglesias	from the album Insomniac
"Dream On Dreamer" 🎬	Brand New Heavies	from the album Brother Sister
"I Know You Want Me (Calle Ocho)"	Pitbull	from the album Pitbull Starring in Rebelution
"Just Dance" 🎬	Lady Gaga	from the album The Fame
"La Camisa Negra" 🎬	Juanes	from the album Mi Sangre
"Let's Get It Started" 🎬	Black Eyed Peas	from the album Elephunk
"Pocketful Of Sunshine" 🎬	Natasha Bedingfield	from the album Pocketful of Sunshine
"So What"	Pink	from the album Funhouse
"Viva La Vida" 🎬	Coldplay	from the album Viva la Vida or Death and All His Friends
"When I Grow Up" 🎬	Pussycat Dolls	from the album Doll Domination
"You Got It (The Right Stuff)" 🎬	New Kids On The Block	from the album Hangin' Tough
Console and arcade licenses (2 total)
Please consult the arcade song list.
New Konami Originals (14 total)
Please consult the arcade song list.
Konami Original console exclusives (3 total)
"DYNAMITE RAVE"🔒	NAOKI	Uses console exclusive charts Original song from DDR 3rdMix uses new music from DDR X (NA/EU)
"Keep on movin'"🔒	NM	from Dance Dance Revolution Furu Furu Party (JP Wii) remake of the song from Dance Dance Revolution 2ndMix
"TRUE♥LOVE (Clubstar's True Club Mix)"🔒	jun feat. Schanita	from Dance Dance Revolution Hottest Party (JP Wii)
Konami Original revivals (24 total)
"A Geisha's Dream"🔒	NAOKI feat. SMiLE.dk	from Dance Dance Revolution X
"AM-3P("CHAOS" Special)"🔒	KTz	from Dance Dance Revolution SuperNova 2 Maxing out Chaos aspect Original song from Dance Dance Revolution 2ndMix
"B4U("VOLTAGE" Special)"🔒	NAOKI	from Dance Dance Revolution SuperNova 2 Maxing out Voltage aspect Original song from Dance Dance Revolution 4thMix
"Baile Le Samba" 🎬	Big Idea	from Dance Dance Revolution Ultramix 2
"Blue Rain"🔒	dj TAKA vs Ryu☆	from beatmania IIDX 15 DJ TROOPERS
"BRILLIANT 2U("STREAM" Special)"🔒	NAOKI	from Dance Dance Revolution SuperNova 2 Maxing out Stream aspect Original song from Dance Dance Revolution 2ndMix
"Chance and Dice"🔒	Nippon Shonen	from jubeat
"D2R("FREEZE" Special)"🔒	NAOKI	from Dance Dance Revolution SuperNova 2 Maxing out Freeze aspect Original song from DDRMAX2 Dance Dance Revolution 7thMix
"DYNAMITE RAVE("AIR" Special)"🔒	NAOKI	from Dance Dance Revolution SuperNova 2 Maxing out Air aspect Original song from DDR 3rdMix uses new music from DDR X (NA/EU)
"HYSTERIA"	NAOKI 190	from Dance Dance Revolution Solo Bass Mix
"L'amour et la liberté(DDR ver.)" 🎬	NAOKI underground	from beatmania IIDX 6th Style
"La Bamba"	LH MUSIC CREATION	from Dance Dance Revolution SuperNova cover of a classic Mexican folk song
"La Señorita Virtual"	2MB	from Dance Dance Revolution 3rdMix (PS)
"Let the beat hit em! (CLASSIC R&B STYLE)"	Stone Bros.	from Dance Dance Revolution Extra Mix
"LOVE IS ORANGE" 🎬	Orange Lounge	from beatmania IIDX 8th Style
"MARS WAR 3"	JET GIRL SPIN	from pop'n music 13 カーニバル
"MOONSTER"	kobo uniting Marsha & D.	from Dance Dance Revolution SuperNova (JP PS2)
"MY SUMMER LOVE (TOMMY'S SMILE MIX)"	MITSU-O! with GEILA	from DDRMAX2 Dance Dance Revolution 7thMix
"NADESHIKO" (凛として咲く花の如く) 🎬🔒	Red Litmus (紅色リトマス)	from pop'n music 15 ADVENTURE
"TIERRA BUENA"	WILMA DE OLIVEIRA	from GuitarFreaks 9thMix & DrumMania 8thMix
"Übertreffen"🔒	TAKA respect for J.S.B.	from pop'n music 14 FEVER!
"un deux trois" 🎬	SDMS	from Dance Dance Revolution Extreme (JP PS2)
"ZERO" 🎬🔒	TЁЯRA	from beatmania IIDX 14 GOLD
Boss Songs (5 total)
"Dance Dance Revolution" 🔒	DDR ALL STARS	from Dance Dance Revolution Extreme; Accessible as FINAL STAGE#1
"Pluto The First" 🔒	WHITE WALL	from Dance Dance Revolution Hottest Party (JP Wii); Accessible as EXTRA STAGE#1; Accessible as FINAL STAGE#2
"KIMONO♥PRINCESS" 🔒	jun	New Konami Original; Accessible as ENCORE EXTRA STAGE#1; Accessible as EXTRA STAGE#2; Accessible as FINAL STAGE#3
"DEAD END("GROOVE RADAR" Special)" 🔒	N&S	from Dance Dance Revolution SuperNova 2 Maxing out all aspects Original song from Dance Dance Revolution 3rdMix; Accessible as ENCORE EXTRA STAGE#2; Accessible as EXTRA STAGE#3
"roppongi EVOLVED" 🔒	TAG underground	New Konami Original; Accessible as ENCORE EXTRA STAGE#3 song is split into 3 versions

Notes

- † This song was absent in the North American and European releases of Dance Dance Revolution X.
- 🎬 This song has a music video which is played full-screen.
- 🎬 (BG) This song has a music video which is played in an in-game background dance stage.
- 💿 This song originates from DDR X2 for the PlayStation 2, and from DDR Hottest Party 3 for the Wii.

== Courses ==
In Course Mode, players go through anywhere from four to seven songs with no breaks. Players may set options before a course is played, but not midway between songs. There are two kinds of courses: ordinary courses and drill courses. Ordinary courses offer two difficulties: Normal and Difficult. The dance gauge used is different between ordinary courses; those with five songs use the normal dance gauge, while those with six or seven songs use the battery dance gauge, where scoring a "Good", "Miss", or "N.G." judgment step will drain a non-renewable bar. In Normal difficulty, players start with eight bars, while Difficult only gives them four bars. As for drill courses, all of them contain four songs, there is only one difficulty option, and the songs are different between Single and Double Style. In the drill course list, the colors yellow, fuchsia, green, and navy blue indicate that the song is played on Basic, Difficult, Expert, and Challenge, respectively.

=== Courses ===
Name	Songs
HAPPY TUNES!!	1. "Taking It To The Sky"
HAPPY TUNES!!	2. "Gotta Dance"
HAPPY TUNES!!	3. "Shine"
HAPPY TUNES!!	4. "Sky Is The Limit"
HAPPY TUNES!!	5. "A Brighter Day"
joyfull WORKOUT	1. "La receta"
joyfull WORKOUT	2. "Freeze"
joyfull WORKOUT	3. "You are a Star"
joyfull WORKOUT	4. "La libertad"
joyfull WORKOUT	5. "Crazy Control"
ESSENTIAL	1. "more more more"
ESSENTIAL	2. "only my railgun"
ESSENTIAL	3. "EZ DO DANCE"
ESSENTIAL	4. "Hide-away"
ESSENTIAL	5. "Be your wings"
POWER PUSH X2	1. "Everytime We Touch"
POWER PUSH X2	2. "Time After Time"
POWER PUSH X2	3. "DAFT PUNK IS PLAYING AT MY HOUSE"
POWER PUSH X2	4. "TENSHI"
POWER PUSH X2	5. "ETERNITY"
POWER PUSH X2	6. "SUPER EUROBEAT <GOLD MIX>"
From IIDX	1. "smooooch・∀・"
From IIDX	2. "Dazzlin' Darlin"
From IIDX	3. "Second Heaven"
From IIDX	4. "不沈艦CANDY"
From IIDX	5. "FIRE FIRE"
From IIDX	6. "She is my wife"
REVIVAL	1. "Butterfly (2008 X-edit)"
REVIVAL	2. "IF YOU WERE HERE"
REVIVAL	3. "HERO"
REVIVAL	4. "DUB-I-DUB (2008 X-edit)"
REVIVAL	5. "DAM DARIRAM"
REVIVAL	6. "CAPTAIN JACK (GRANDALE REMIX)"
SPEED MASTER	1. "volcano"
SPEED MASTER	2. "DROP OUT"
SPEED MASTER	3. "The Least 100sec"
SPEED MASTER	4. "Across the nightmare"
SPEED MASTER	5. "real-high-SPEED"
DIVA & best	1. "All My Love"
DIVA & best	2. "THIS NIGHT"
DIVA & best	3. "Sacred Oath"
DIVA & best	4. "Super Driver"
DIVA & best	5. "Leaving..."
Sakura Street	1. "華爛漫 -Flowers-"
Sakura Street	2. "Sakura Sunrise"
Sakura Street	3. "桜"
Sakura Street	4. "sakura storm"
Sakura Street	5. "GRADUATION ～それぞれの明日～"
DDR ARCHIVES	1. "What Will Come of Me"
DDR ARCHIVES	2. "in love wit you"
DDR ARCHIVES	3. "Dummy"
DDR ARCHIVES	4. "CG Project"
DDR ARCHIVES	5. "Love Again"
DDR ARCHIVES	6. "aftershock!!"
Boss Rush X2	1. "KIMONO♥PRINCESS"
Boss Rush X2	2. "ZETA ～素数の世界と超越者～"
Boss Rush X2	3. "VANESSA"
Boss Rush X2	4. "888"
Boss Rush X2	5. "ΔMAX"
Boss Rush X2	6. "roppongi EVOLVED ver.D"
TAG	1. "Heatstroke"
TAG	2. "SABER WING"
TAG	3. "roppongi EVOLVED ver.A"
TAG	4. "SABER WING (Akira Ishihara Headshot mix)"
TAG	5. "POSSESSION"
greatFull REMIXER	1. "☆shining☆"
greatFull REMIXER	2. "Dazzlin' Darlin -秋葉工房mix-"
greatFull REMIXER	3. "Poseidon (kors k mix)"
greatFull REMIXER	4. "IF YOU WERE HERE (L.E.D.-G STYLE REMIX)"
greatFull REMIXER	5. "KISS KISS KISS 秋葉工房 MIX"
Pluto Story	1. "PARANOiA ~HADES~"
Pluto Story	2. "Pluto"
Pluto Story	3. "Pluto Relinquish"
Pluto Story	4. "Pluto The First"
Pluto Story	5. "冥"
dj TAKA's Lounge	1. "Decade"
dj TAKA's Lounge	2. "DROP"
dj TAKA's Lounge	3. "someday..."
dj TAKA's Lounge	4. "going up"
dj TAKA's Lounge	5. "Melody Life"
dj TAKA's Lounge	6. "Freeway Shuffle"
VS REPLICANT	1. "Pierce The Sky"
VS REPLICANT	2. "Sakura Sunrise"
VS REPLICANT	3. "Shiny World"
VS REPLICANT	4. "Anti-Matter"
VS REPLICANT	5. "New Decade"
VS REPLICANT	6. "POSSESSION"
VS REPLICANT	7. "Valkyrie dimension"

=== Drill courses ===
Name	SINGLE	DOUBLE
DANCE DRILL Lv.1	1. "AFTER THE GAME OF LOVE"	1. "BABY BABY GIMME YOUR LOVE"
DANCE DRILL Lv.1	2. "BABY BABY GIMME YOUR LOVE"	2. "SO IN LOVE"
DANCE DRILL Lv.1	3. "GORGEOUS 2012"	3. "i feel..."
DANCE DRILL Lv.1	4. "DESTINY"	4. "Forever Sunshine"
DANCE DRILL Lv.2	1. "Baile Le Samba"	1. "KISS ME ALL NIGHT LONG"
DANCE DRILL Lv.2	2. "I Need You"	2. "A Stupid Barber"
DANCE DRILL Lv.2	3. "Try 2 Luv.U"	3. "ABSOLUTE"
DANCE DRILL Lv.2	4. "THE SHINING POLARIS"	4. "HIGHER"
DANCE DRILL Lv.3	1. "Saturday Night Love"	1. "Don't Stop! (AMD 2nd MIX)"
DANCE DRILL Lv.3	2. "Jam&Marmalade"	2. "蒼い衝動 (for EXTREME)"
DANCE DRILL Lv.3	3. "CUTIE CHASER"	3. "♥LOVE² シュガ→♥"
DANCE DRILL Lv.3	4. "PUT YOUR FAITH IN ME"	4. "HYSTERIA"
DANCE DRILL Lv.4	1. "think ya better D"	1. "Silver Platform -I wanna get your heart-"
DANCE DRILL Lv.4	2. "Kind Lady"	2. "dream of love"
DANCE DRILL Lv.4	3. "♥LOVE² シュガ→♥"	3. "Kind Lady"
DANCE DRILL Lv.4	4. "BURNIN' THE FLOOR"	4. "A thing called LOVE"
DANCE DRILL Lv.5	1. "LOVE AGAIN TONIGHT (For Melissa MIX)"	1. "サナ・モレッテ・ネ・エンテ"
DANCE DRILL Lv.5	2. "KISS KISS KISS"	2. "La Senorita"
DANCE DRILL Lv.5	3. "STARS★★★ (2nd NAOKI's style)"	3. "Let the beat hit 'em! (CLASSIC R&B STYLE)"
DANCE DRILL Lv.5	4. "Happy Wedding"	4. "Miracle Moon (L.E.D. LIGHT STYLE MIX)"
DANCE DRILL Lv.6	1. "Quickening"	1. "SOUL CRASH"
DANCE DRILL Lv.6	2. "BRILLIANT 2U"	2. "Why not"
DANCE DRILL Lv.6	3. "My Only Shining Star"	3. "un deux trois"
DANCE DRILL Lv.6	4. "華爛漫 -Flowers-"	4. "SUNKiSS DROP"
DANCE DRILL Lv.7	1. "B4U"	1. "MAKE IT BETTER"
DANCE DRILL Lv.7	2. "LEADING CYBER"	2. "V (for EXTREME)"
DANCE DRILL Lv.7	3. "TRIP MACHINE"	3. "stealth"
DANCE DRILL Lv.7	4. "Saturn"	4. "Music In The Rhythm"
DANCE DRILL Lv.8	1. "Dance Dance Revolution"	1. "321STARS"
DANCE DRILL Lv.8	2. "Freeway Shuffle"	2. "Feelings Won't Fade (Extend Trance Mix)"
DANCE DRILL Lv.8	3. "xenon"	3. "Raspberry♥Heart (English version)"
DANCE DRILL Lv.8	4. "PARANOiA"	4. "AM-3P"
DANCE DRILL Lv.9	1. "Blue Rain"	1. "TRIP MACHINE (luv MIX)"
DANCE DRILL Lv.9	2. "ABSOLUTE"	2. "Electrified"
DANCE DRILL Lv.9	3. "革命"	3. "華爛漫 -Flowers-"
DANCE DRILL Lv.9	4. "The Least 100sec"	4. "TOMORROW"
DANCE DRILL Lv.10	1. "INNOCENCE OF SILENCE"	1. "革命"
DANCE DRILL Lv.10	2. "DYNAMITE RAVE"	2. "BROKEN MY HEART"
DANCE DRILL Lv.10	3. "VANITY ANGEL"	3. "Votum stellarum -forest #25 DDR RMX-"
DANCE DRILL Lv.10	4. "AA"	4. "AFRONOVA"
DANCE DRILL Lv.11	1. "CAN'T STOP FALLIN' IN LOVE (SPEED MIX)"	
DANCE DRILL Lv.11	2. "Across the nightmare"	2. "SEDUCTION"
DANCE DRILL Lv.11	3. "Healing Vision (Angelic mix)"	3. "Uranus"
DANCE DRILL Lv.11	4. "on the bounce"	4. "Horatio"
DANCE DRILL Lv.12	1. "Übertreffen"	1. "Fly away -mix del matador-"
DANCE DRILL Lv.12	2. "Xepher"	2. "CaptivAte ~誓い~
DANCE DRILL Lv.12	3. "Unreal"	
DANCE DRILL Lv.12	4. "MAX 300"	
DANCE DRILL Lv.13	1. "NGO"	1. "Healing Vision (Angelic mix)"
DANCE DRILL Lv.13	2. "PARANOIA survivor MAX"	2. "Xepher"
DANCE DRILL Lv.13	3. "MAXX UNLIMITED"	3. "SUPER SAMURAI"
DANCE DRILL Lv.13	4. "MAX 300 (Super-Max-Me Mix)"	4. "Arrabbiata"
DANCE DRILL Lv.14	1. "Fascination ~eternal love mix~"	1. "PARANOiA -Respect-"
DANCE DRILL Lv.14	2. "Trim"	2. "PARANOIA survivor MAX"
DANCE DRILL Lv.14	3. "SABER WING (Akira Ishihara Headshot mix)"	3. "MAX 300 (Super-Max-Me Mix)"
DANCE DRILL Lv.14	4. "Fascination MAXX"	4. "Fascination ~eternal love mix~"
DANCE DRILL Lv.15	1. "Trigger"	1. "Fascination MAXX"
DANCE DRILL Lv.15	2. "Healing-D-Vision"	
DANCE DRILL Lv.15	3. "PARANOiA ~HADES~"	3. "Pluto Relinquish"
DANCE DRILL Lv.15	4. "Pluto Relinquish"	4. "PARANOiA ~HADES~"

== In popular culture ==
In the 2012 Disney animated film Wreck-It Ralph, an arcade cabinet of the game can be seen in the opening of the wide-view of Litwak's Arcade during Ralph's speech.
