= Fascination =

Fascination may refer to:

== Film and television ==
- Fascination (1922 film), an American silent film directed by Robert Z. Leonard
- Fascination (1931 film), a British film directed by Miles Mander
- Fascination: Portrait of a Lady, a 1977 Japanese pornographic film directed by Kōyū Ohara
- Fascination (1979 film), a French horror film directed by Jean Rollin
- Fascination (2004 film), an American-German film directed by Klaus Menzel
- Fascinación, a 1949 Argentine film directed by Carlos Schlieper
- "Fascination" (Star Trek: Deep Space Nine), a 1994 TV episode

== Games ==
- Fascination (redemption game), a game commonly found in amusement parks
- Fascination (video game), a 1991 video game by Coktel Vision

== Music ==
- "Fascination" (1905 song), a 1905 song used in several films and recorded many times
- "Fascination", a stride piano composition by James P. Johnson recorded in 1917 (as a piano roll) and 1939 (acoustic)
- "Fascination" (David Bowie song), 1975
- Fascination!, a 1983 album by The Human League
  - "(Keep Feeling) Fascination", a 1983 song in The Human League album Fascination!
- "Fascination" (Donna Summer song), 1987
- "Fascination" (Alphabeat song), 2006
- Fascination (album), a 2009 album by The Greencards
- Fascination, a 2022 album by The Birthday Massacre
- "Fascination (Eternal Love Mix)", a song from the music video game Dance Dance Revolution SuperNova
- Fascination Records, part of the Polydor record label

== Other uses ==
- Fascination (short story collection), a 2004 short story collection by William Boyd
- MS Fascination, the fourth ship in Carnival Cruise Lines' Fantasy class of mega-cruise ships
- Fascination, an automobile prototype developed by Paul M. Lewis
- Fascination, a 1992 production by the Cirque du Soleil
- Fascination, a Marvel Comics character and member of Technet, more commonly known as Scatterbrain

== See also ==
- Fascinated (disambiguation)
- Fasciation, an abnormal plant growth
- Fascinación, a 1949 film by Carlos Schlieper
- Fasciinatiion, 2008 album by The Faint
- Fascinate, a graffiti painting in Bromsten, Stockholm
- Fascinus, the embodiment of the divine phallus in ancient Roman religion and magic
