= Fascinated =

Fascinated may refer to:

- "Fascinated" (Company B song), 1987
- "Fascinated" (FreeSol song), 2011
- "Fascinated" (Ivy song), 2011
- Fascinated (Rick Ross song)

== See also ==
- Fascination (disambiguation)
