= Dance Dance Revolution Ultramix 3 =

2005 video game

Dance Dance Revolution ULTRAMIX 3
- Developer: Konami Computer Entertainment Hawaii
- Publisher: Konami
- Series: Dance Dance Revolution
- Platform: Xbox
- Release: NA: November 15, 2005; EU: March 17, 2006
- Genre: Music
- Modes: Single player, multiplayer

Dance Dance Revolution ULTRAMIX 3 is a music video game developed by Konami and the tenth entry of Dance Dance Revolution released in the United States. It was released on November 15, 2005 for the Xbox. About 70 songs are available in total in this version. The game was announced in a press release by Konami on May 17, 2005, and unveiled at the E³ expo in Los Angeles that same day.

== Gameplay ==
Similar to previous Dance Dance Revolution (DDR) titles, this game is played by listening to the music and hitting the up/down/left/right arrows when they hit the outline at the top of the screen after coming up from the bottom. This may be done with an Xbox controller or a DDR controller (dance mat). If you miss steps, your health goes down, but if you time one correctly, the health bar in the upper left slightly goes up. Each individual arrow gets a rating on how close the timing was.

Game Mode is the main mode of DDR Ultramix 3. It plays similarly to the version in the arcade, where a song is picked at a certain difficulty (beginner, light, standard, heavy) and is played through. If you run out of health before the song is completed, the song ends and you fail it. After the song, you get a rating depending on how well you did. Game Mode may also be played with two pads instead of one. Some songs also support an Oni difficulty mode, which may be as difficult, slightly less difficult, or slightly more difficult as the heavy difficulty. While selecting a song, the order of the songs can be changed by default order, alphabetical order, speed of the songs, artist order, and banner order. When holding down A to select a song, there are ways to modify the song before playing through it, such as changing the speed, direction of the arrow flow, and other modifiers.

The goal of Attack Mode is to knock your opponents down to the bottom line. Getting a combo of a certain five arrows in a row will create an effect during the song to help you or hinder your opponents. In Bomb Mode, everyone passes around a bomb which will explode after a certain amount of time, and last one standing without the bomb wins. Quad Mode is similar to Game Mode, but the player uses four pads at once. With Sync Mode, everyone must press the arrow at the same time to get through the song. Getting a Good or lower on any step will immediately end the song.

In Score Battle, whoever gets the highest score wins. Point Battle is made for two players, each person starting with 16 points. A player loses a point if the rating of an opponent’s step is higher than the other’s. The game ends when the loser’s points get to zero. Freestyle follows the basics of picking a song, but there are always four players, and there are no arrows to follow. Players have to hit arrows according to the music. Tips at the bottom of the screen give players tips on how to be a better freestyle dancer throughout the course of the song.

In Quest Mode, players take control of a character and move around North America trying to become the best dancer. While playing, there are two types of values. One is Fanbase, which is how well you do on a certain song. If you do well in a certain area (get a high enough Fanbase on a song), then you will be recognized as a great dancer there. The other value is Points. Points are gained with each step taken during a song and can be used to buy new things like managers, dancers for your team, and fees for traveling between cities. Getting new managers or dance members on your team throughout the game will make your Fanbase and Points go up even faster with every song.

When Workout Mode is enabled, the game will keep track of every step made by the controller attached to the port. When the "Summary Screen" is called upon, it will display everything that the user has done in every game mode. There is also an option to input the weight, and turn on the "Calorie Tracker", which tells the player how many calories a player burns. In Challenge Mode, there will be specific challenges the game will give you to move on to the next level. There are ten levels to be completed, each with its set of unique objectives. Training Mode changes the style of songs and uses helping modifiers in order to learn a certain song. It can be started and stopped at any time, and make way for practicing of only certain parts. Jukebox Mode makes the songs available for listening without having to play them.

Edit Mode allows you to customize the steps for any song, allowing you to play at your own style. These customized steps can also be used in other modes, and uploaded or downloaded via Xbox Live. Xbox Live also allows the player to connect with other people who are currently playing the game, and can be used for downloading song packs.

== Soundtrack ==
Ultramix 3 features more than 70 songs of different genres.

Song Title	Artist
Alphabet Aerobics	Blackalicious
Bag	RevenG
Balalaika, Carried With The Wind (Jondi & Spesh mix)	Julie Ann Frost
Bassile	OR-IF-IS
Bath of Least Resistance	NOFX
Body Rock (Olav Basoski's Da Hot Funk Da Freak Funk Remix)	Moby
Breakdown	BeForU
Butterfly	Smile.dk
Bye Bye Baby Balloon	JOGA
Candy(star)	Luv unlimited
Carnival Day	Paula Terry & Fu Fu's
Come With Me	Yahel & Tammy
Come With Me	Raindancer
Conflict (Turmoil mix)	The Azoic
Crazy In Love	wg feat. Indra J
Daikenkai	Des-ROW 限UNION
Delta 32(UFO! Remix)	True Force
Destiny Lovers	Kunitake Miyuki
e-motion	e.o.s.
Firefly	BeForU
Frozen Ray (DIRTYHERTZ mix)	dj TAKA
Hash the Sun	Chatanix
Hateful	The Clash
Hey Mama	The Black Eyed Peas
Hot On the Phone	Boyjazz
I Am Gothic (2003 Remix)	Spray
I Just Wanna Live	Good Charlotte
Imperfection (Tycho Brahe mix)	Real Life
Istanbul (Not Constantinople)	They Might Be Giants
Kiss Me All Night Long	NAOKI J-STYLE feat. MIU
Mi Alma	Ozomatli
Midnight Frankenstein	Stay Gold Pony Boy
Miracle Moon ~L.E.D. LIGHT STYLE MIX~	Togo Project feat. Sana
Moment 40	Moshic
Nari Narien (Jay Dabhi remix)	Jay Dabhi vs. Hisham Abbas
Play That Funky Music	wg feat. Tony L.
Pot-pourri d'orange	Orange Lounge
Raise Your Hands	Midihead
Rock Lobster	The B-52's
Rock-a-billy Willy	Big Idea
Sakura	RevenG
So Many Times	Gadjo
Stakeout (Ultra:mix)	Freezepop
Sunflower Girl	SHORTCUTS
Superstylin'	Groove Armada
The Cat In The Moon	901(Clay)
The Cult of Gnosyllis	Orange Koresh
The Imperial Carnival	kumiko
The Spirit of Hawk	chuji
TOGETHER & FOREVER	CAPTAIN JACK
Virtual Insanity	wg feat. Austin Willacy (Originally by Jamiroquai)
Walk This Way	Run D.M.C. and Aerosmith
What I'd Say	Ray Charles
Where's Your Head At?	Basement Jaxx
Whip It	Devo
Why (Club Mix)	Nevarakka

== Reception ==
Reception

Aggregate score
Aggregator	Score
Metacritic	75/100

Review scores
Publication	Score
GameSpot	7.5/10
GameSpy	3.5/5
GameZone	7.5/10
TeamXbox	8.5/10

Dance Dance Revolution Ultramix 3 received "generally favorable" reviews, according to the video game review aggregator Metacritic.

Preceded by Dance Dance Revolution Ultramix 2	Dance Dance Revolution Ultramix 3; 2005	Succeeded by Dance Dance Revolution Ultramix 4
