= Beatmania IIDX 10th Style =

2004 video game

- Titlescreen of the CS version
- Developer: Konami Computer Entertainment Tokyo
- Publisher: Konami
- Series: Beatmania IIDX & Bemani
- Platforms: Arcade & Sony PlayStation 2
- Release: Arcade: JP: February 2004; PlayStation 2: JP: November 17, 2005
- Genre: Music
- Modes: Single-player & Multiplayer
- Arcade system: Konami Bemani PC Type 1

beatmania IIDX 10th Style is the tenth game in the beatmania IIDX series of music video games. It was released in arcades by Konami in early 2004.

== Gameplay ==
Beatmania IIDX tasks the player with performing songs through a controller consisting of seven key buttons and a scratchable turntable. Hitting the notes with strong timing increases the score and groove gauge bar, allowing the player to finish the stage. Failing to do so depletes the gauge until it is empty, abruptly ending the song.

The core gameplay remains the same in 10th Style. The previous flashing 7 difficulty level was replaced by a difficulty level of 8. In addition, an animated particle effect now occurs if a full combo is scored on a song. Also, now two players can set different modifiers.

== e-Amusement ==
e-Amusement support was extended in 10th Style, now being able to sort songs in folders based on whether they have been cleared in various ways. These include Failed, Cleared, Easy Clear (for songs played with the Easy modifier), and Full Combo.

== Songs ==
Genre	Song	Artist	Tier
Piano Ambient	5.8.8.	dj nagureo	
Game Music	A-JAX (3-WAY MIX)	Mr.T	
Psychedelic Trance	ALIEN TEMPLE	PINK PONG	
Dream Techno	ASTRAL VOYAGE	EeL	
Italo Pop	BABY LOVE	Noria	
2Step Pop Trance	Back Into The Light	Sota Fujimori	
Dance & Electronic	Alive	3XM Feat. Natalie Horler	
Rococo Tek	BOUNDARY	SPARKER	
Eurobeat	CARRY ON NIGHT (English version)	platoniX (EURO Style)	
Psychedelic Trance	Changes	TaQ	
J-Revival	choo choo train (dnb mix)	SLAKE feat. Mika	
Electronica	Cosmic Raise	Toshiji Katoh	
Eurobeat	Daisuke	Y&Co.	
Ethno Hardcore	Debty Daddy	sampling master AYA	
Piano Ballad	desolation	Mr.T	
Hyper J-Pop	DoLL	TËЯRA	Appeared in SuperNova
J-Revival	どんなときも。 (Donnatokimo)	Mr.T と Brother Hiro	
J-Pop	Don't forget	中山結衣	
House	Drop on the floor	good-cool	
Electroshock	EXE	Mr.T	
Break Beats	Feedback	Audio Highs	
Drum'n'Bass	FEEL IT	RAM	
Natural Sound	Freezing atmosphere	Twin AmadeuS	
Goa Trance	GHOST REVIVAL	L.E.D.	
Gradius	GRADIUS (FULL SPEED)	Mr.T	
Rave	HIGH	RAM	
Trance	HI SCHOOL DREAM	PINK PONG	
J-Revival	一途な恋 (HYPER J-EURO MIX) (Ichizuna Koi (J-EURO MIX))	TËЯRA	
Techno	Innocent Walls	TaQ	
J-Revival	JAM	TAKA with Junpei & 三上	
Medium Wave	Let's run	Mitsuto Suzuki	
Techno	LIMITED	SLAKE	
Trance	Love is Eternity	kors k	
Rave	LOW	RAM	
Dance Pop	Lucy	ELE BLOCK	
Artcore	Narcissus at Oasis	Ryu☆	
Progressive Baroque	No. 13	TAKA respects for J.S.B.	Appeared in SuperNova
Hiphop	NO DOUBT GET LOUD	ASLETICS	
Trance	pandora	dj TAKA feat. Tomomi	
RB	PLATONIC-XXX	platoniX (RB Style)	
Rave	R2	tiger YAMATO	
Happy Hardcore	rainbow rainbow	Ryu☆	Appeared in SuperNova
Nu Jazz	Ready to Rackit Blues	SLAKE	
Trance	Rise'n Beauty	SOTA feat. Cyborg Akemi	
Piano Ambient	scherzo	Osamu Kubota	
Tech House	SCORE	DJ Remo-con	
Break Beats	Shakin'31	DJ Remo-Con	
Hard House	雪月花 (Setsugekka)	Ryu☆	
J-Pop	SHOOTING STAR	小坂りゆ	
Trance	Smell Like This	Y&Co.	
戦艦テクノ (Battleship Techno)	SPACE FIGHT	AKIRA YAMAOKA	
ムートラ (Mootora(Mood Trance))	システムロマンス (System Romance)	ヒロシ&チー子	
Northern Europe	Think of me	good-cool feat. Sana	
お江戸テクノ (Oedo Techno)	1st Samurai	sampling master MEGA	ES
Happy	One More Lovely	Risk Junk	OMES

== Home version ==
The home version was released in Japan on November 17, 2005 for the PlayStation 2. It contained previews from Happy Sky, along with several exclusive songs, including crossover tunes from other Bemani games like DDR Ultramix 3.
