= Mambo a Go Go =

2002 arcade video game

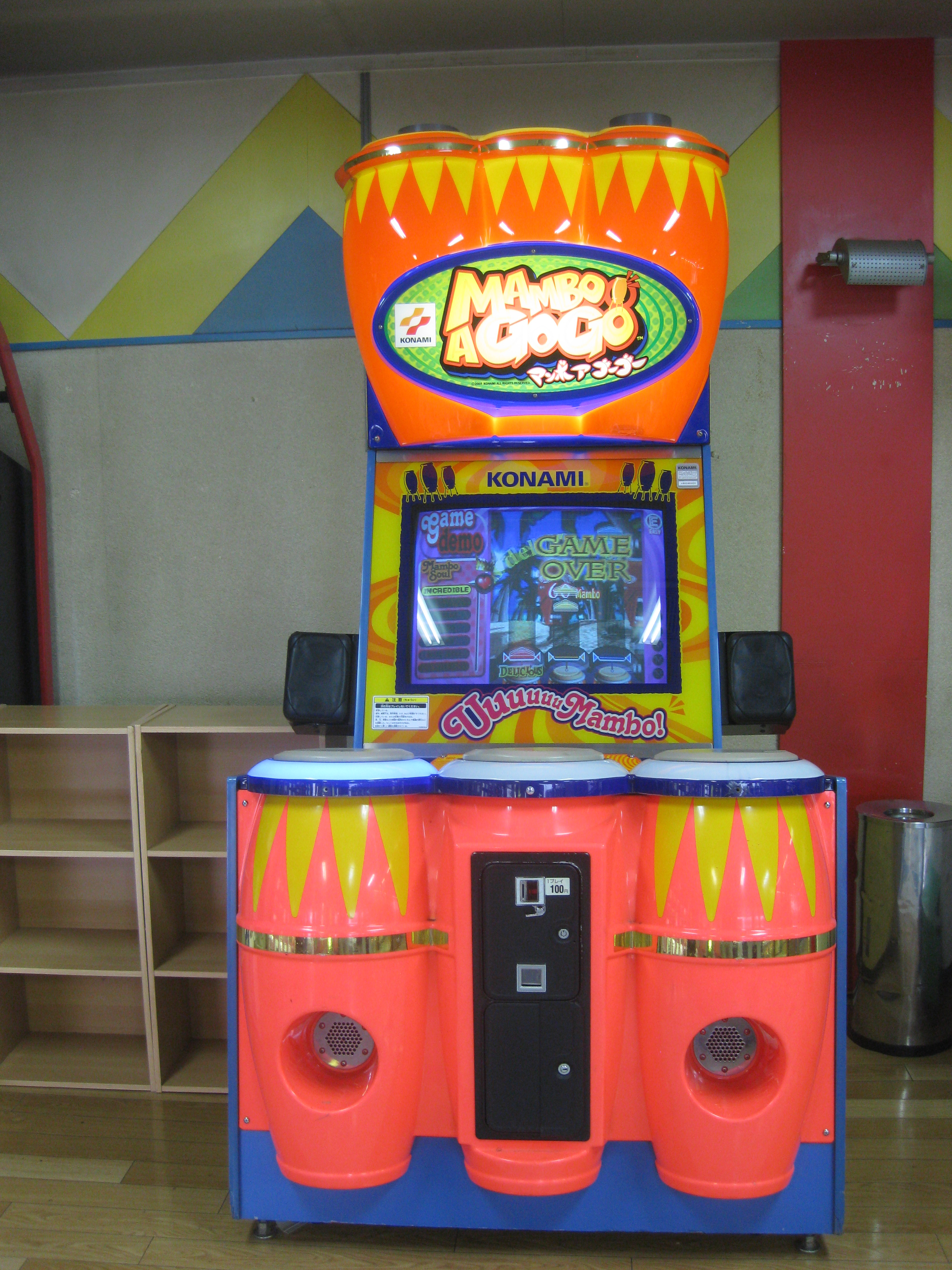
A Mambo a Go Go arcade cabinet

Mambo a Go Go, is a music video game produced by Konami as part of their BEMANI franchise of games. Players must rhythmically beat conga drums as colored notes fall from the top of the screen. There are 3 drums, each one divided into three sections, giving players a maximum of nine places to hit.

The game predominantly features Latin music including "Mambo No. 5", "La Bamba" and "El Bimbo", the song that served as the basis for "El Ritmo Tropical" used in the Dance Dance Revolution series.

Mambo a Go Go is likely one of the most obscure BEMANI games released, as it was overshadowed by another music game produced by Sega; Samba de Amigo. Despite this, some songs such as "Gamelan de Couple" and "La Bamba" were popular enough to make appearances in other BEMANI series games such as beatmania, Dance Dance Revolution, and pop'n music.

A release of Mambo a Go Go in the United States under the title Mambo King was planned, but never materialized.

== Reception ==
In Japan, Game Machine listed Mambo a Go Go on their September 1, 2001 issue as being the eleventh most-successful dedicated arcade game of the month.
