= Yoshitaka Nishimura =

Yoshitaka Nishimura 西村宜隆
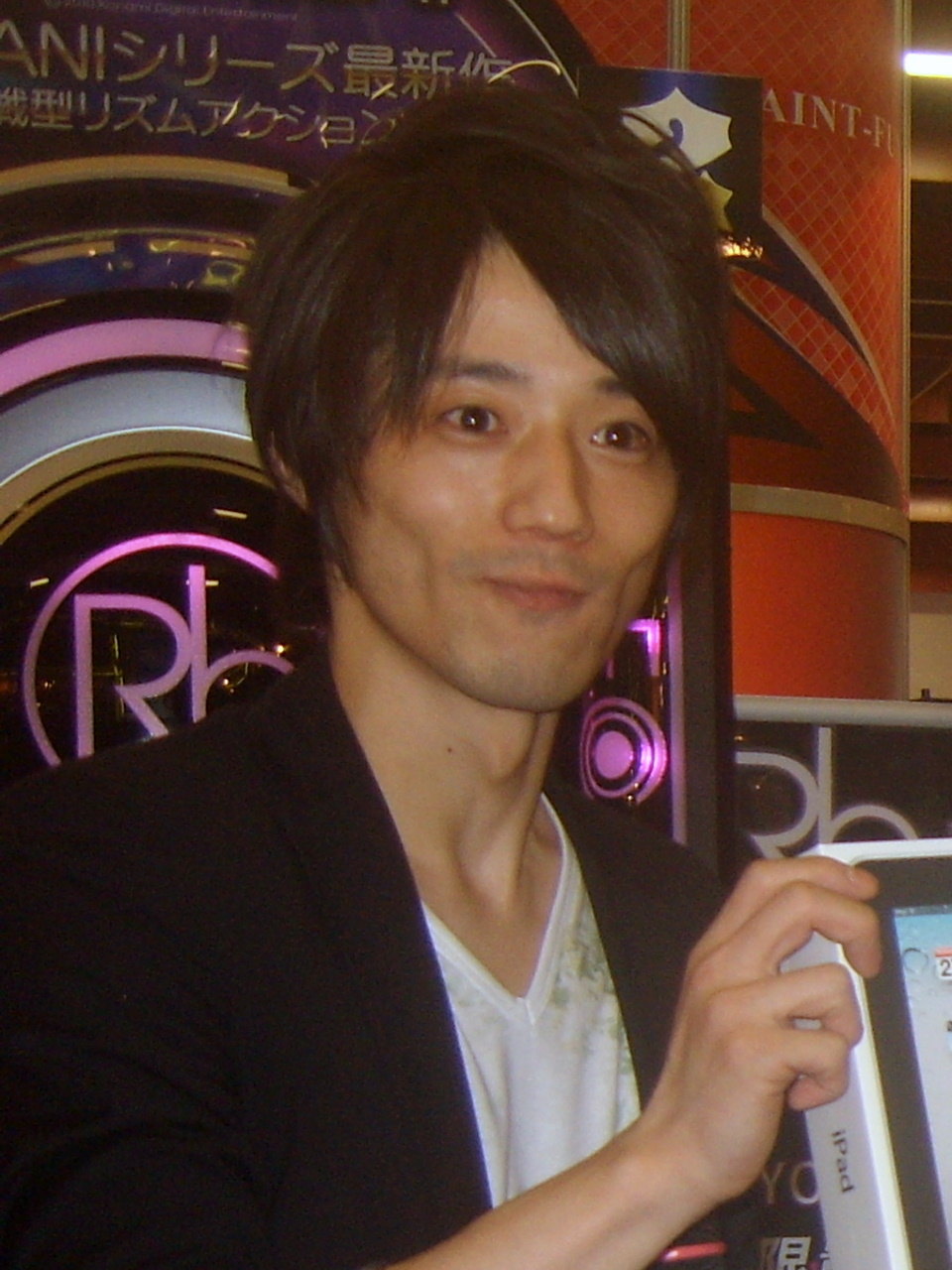
- Yoshitaka Nishimura in 2011

Background information
- Also known as: DJ YOSHITAKA
- Born: February 9, 1979 (age 47); Kyushu, Japan
- Occupations: Composer; producer; business executive
- Years active: 2004-present
- Label: Konami

Yoshitaka Nishimura (Japanese: 西村宜隆, Hepburn: Nishimura Yoshitaka; born February 9, 1979), better known as DJ Yoshitaka, is a Japanese musician and businessman best known for his work on Konami's line of Bemani games. He has been making solo songs since the release of Beatmania IIDX 11: IIDX Red, though he has had previous Bemani involvement as a member of Osamu Migitera's Des-ROW group. He often composes for the Beatmania IIDX and the Pop'n music series, and then began composing for the Guitar Freaks & DrumMania and the Dance Dance Revolution series in 2005 and 2007, respectively. DJ Yoshitaka often works with Des-ROW for songs in the Pop'n music series. In the Reflec Beat series, DJ Yoshitaka regularly composes and sings alongside fellow composer Sota Fujimori as a double act, Venus.

DJ Yoshitaka's Bemani Music Foundation artist page states that he likes taking trips, fine days, cappuccino, Shibuya, motorbikes, vegetable pancakes and people who are kind. It says that he dislikes rainy seasons and people who are cold.

Along with dj Taka, L.E.D., Sota Fujimori, Ryu☆, kors k, and 猫叉Master, DJ Yoshitaka is part of Beatnation Records.

DJ Yoshitaka has been one of the sound producers for Beatmania IIDX since the release of Beatmania IIDX 11: IIDX Red. He became the sound director of the Reflect Beat series since 2010. In 2013, he became the producer of Sound Voltex II -infinite infection-, a sequel to the original KONAMI game Sound Voltex Booth.

In 2015, Yoshitaka served as the production manager of Konami Digital Entertainment. In March 20th, 2019, he was promoted to Executive Officer of Konami Amusement. On October 1, 2025, Nishimura became president of Konami's newly formed Konami Arcade Games subsidiary, when the Konami Group restructured. Due to taking on management roles, his solo musical appearances in Bemani has dwindled as of 2015.

== Songs ==
=== beatmania IIDX ===
beatmania IIDX 11 IIDX Red

- D.A.N.C.E.! (with Kanako Hoshino)
- Close my Eyes for Me (with D-crew and Dennis Gunn)
- リグレット (with Kanako Hoshino; CS version song)

beatmania IIDX 12 Happy Sky

- Catch Me (with ERi)
- CaptivAte ~浄化~ (with A/I)
- Endless Summer Story (with Kanako Hoshino; CS version song)

beatmania IIDX 13 DistorteD

- Spring Rain (Lluvia de Primavera)
- wish (with Kotomi Sugimura)
- WISH (Eurobeat Mix) (with Kotomi Sugimura)
- Bloody Tears (IIDX Edition) (also appears in Dance Dance Revolution SuperNova 2)
- Inferno (with Tomosuke as Caldeira; vocals by Kanako Hoshino)
- タシカナモノ (with dj Taka, Mr. T and Tatsh as the Band; vocals by Kanako Hoshino)
- Contract (under another alias, 朱雀 [Suzaku])
- quell -the seventh slave- (with dj TAKA; CS version song)

beatmania IIDX 14 Gold

- CaptivAte ~誓い~ (with A/I; also appears in Dance Dance Revolution SuperNova 2)
- 星をこの手に (with Kanakplpo Hoshino)
- Ghostbusters
- Vanessa (under another alias, 朱雀 [Suzaku])
- Gold Rush (as DJ Yoshitaka-G, with Michael a la mode)
- Guilt & Love (with jun as The Plastic Ambition; CS version song)

beatmania IIDX 15 DJ Troopers

- I'm In Love Again -DJ Yoshitaka Remix-
- Max Love (with Kanako Hoshino)
- Anisakis -somatic mutation type"Forza"- (under another alias, 朱雀 [Suzaku])
- Mendes (under another alias, Humanoid)
- Claiomh Solais (with S.S.D.; CS version song)

beatmania IIDX 16 Empress

- B4U (Bemani For You Mix, with Michael a la mode)
- CaptivAte2 ~覚醒~ (with e-lma)
- Cyber Force -DJ Yoshitaka Remix-
- I'm Screaming LOVE (with TSU-NA as Creative Life)
- 翼 (with Yuu Kobayashi)
- 卑弥呼 (under another alias, 朱雀 [Suzaku]; with wac as 玄武 [Genbu])
- Colorful Cookie (under another alias, Lucky Vacuum)
- Unicorn tail (CS version song)

beatmania IIDX 17 Sirius

- Non-Fiction Story! (with TSU-NA as Creative Life)
- Elisha (shorter version appears in Reflec Beat)
- Miracle Meets (as Lucky Vacuum)
- フェティッシュペイパー ~脇の汗回転ガール~ (with Akira Yamaoka as ガキ大将ティーム)
- たからもの
- CaptivAte ~裁き~(Sublime Techno Mix)
- Almagest (with Tomosuke as Galdeira)
- Evans -prototype- (used in the Normal and Hyper difficulties of the song from jubeat)

beatmania IIDX 18 Resort Anthem

- Watch Out Pt.2 (with DJ Mass MAD Izm*)
- Stay my side (also appears in Reflec Beat)

beatmania IIDX 19 Lincle

- Snake Stick (with DJ Mass MAD Izm*)

=== Dance Dance Revolution ===
Dance Dance Revolution SuperNova 2

- Girigili 門前雀羅 (Girigili Burning 24H) (with Des-ROW and mur.mur.kurotoh as Cheki-ROWS)
- Vem brincar (with Tomosuke as Caldeira; vocals by Téka Penteriche)

Dance Dance Revolution Hottest Party 2

- Super Hero (with Michaela Thurlow)
- The Lonely Streets (with Robert "RAab" Stevenson)

Dance Dance Revolution X2

- Valkyrie dimension (as Spriggan)

=== GuitarFreaks & DrumMania ===
GuitarFreaks V & DrumMania V

- Endless Cruising (with Des-ROW; vocals by SHIGE)

GuitarFreaks V2 & DrumMania V2

- CaptivAte ~裁き~ (with A/I; also appeared in beatmania IIDX 14 GOLD)

GuitarFreaks V3 & DrumMania V3

- Day's (with Kanako Hoshino)
- 差無来!! (with Des-ROW)

GuitarFreaks V4 & DrumMania V4 Rock×Rock

- Darling my LUV (with B-Agents; also appeared in beatmania IIDX 15 DJ TROOPERS)

GuitarFreaks V5 & DrumMania V5 Rock to Infinity

- 腐斯偽堕日本 (with Des-ROW)
- VANESSA -転生編- (under another alias, 朱雀 [Suzaku]; with TAG)

GuitarFreaks XG & DrumMania XG

- 幻想花 (with Kanako Hoshino)

=== jubeat ===
jubeat

- Evans (also appeared in beatmania IIDX 17 Sirius)

jubeat ripples Append

- ALBIDA (also appeared in beatmania IIDX 18 Resort Anthem)

jubeat knit Append

- FLOWER (also a crossover to REFLEC BEAT as part of the "Append Festival" event held in March 2011)

jubeat copious Append

- Jomanda

jubeat saucer fulfill

- Lisa-Riccia

jubeat Qubell

- Triple Counter (with Takayuki Ishikawa)

jubeat clan

- Couleur=Blanche (with Ryutaro Nakahara)

=== pop'n music ===
pop'n music 12 Iroha

- MY
- 雪上断火 (with Des-ROW as Des-ROW・組)

pop'n music 13 Carnival

- 虹色 (with G.S.C license; also appeared in Dance Dance Revolution SuperNova and beatmania IIDX 13: DistorteD)
- SUN/光線 (with Des-ROW as Des-ROW・組スペシアルz)
- 太陽とバトル (as つよし; a collaboration with Yoshihiko Koezuka, which the artist name is a wordplay of both of their names as Two-Yoshi)
- ランブルメドレー (with cutie smashers)
- 真超深tion (with Des-ROW and Asaki as Des-あさ)

pop'n music 14 Fever!

- High School Love (with DWP; also appeared in beatmania IIDX 14: Gold)
- 晴香-Haruka- (with Kanako Hoshino)
- レトロスペクト路 (with Des-ROW as Des-ROW・組スペシアルz)
- 踊るフィーバーロボ

pop'n music 15 Adventure

- ウィーアー!
- 儚きは我が決意
- 路男 (with Des-ROW as Des-ROW・組ユナイテッド)

pop'n music 16 Party

- Love☆Ba☆zooka！ (with ななっち)
- プリンシプル (with Des-ROW as Des-ROW+Y)

pop'n music 17 The Movie

- Star Ship★Hero (as Lucky Vacuum)

pop'n music 18 Sengoku Retsuden

- Gold RUsh (pop'n Gold Mountain rush) (as DJ Yoshitaka-G feat. Michael a la mode)
- 心のコラージュ (with Yoshihiko Koezuka as つよし)
- 三日天下モンキー

pop'n music 19 Tune Street

- Shion

pop'n music 20 Fantasia

- MANA

pop'n music Sunny Park

- Brand New World (with Sota Fujimori as VENUS)

=== Reflec Beat ===
Reflec Beat

- Choo Choo Train -Venus mix- (with Sota Fujimori as Venus)
- Juicy (with kors k as Lovers DJ Yoshitaka)
- イミテーション語ル死ス (with Des-ROW)
- Special Summer Campaign! (as Lucky Vacuum)
- Survival Games (with Sota Fujimori as Venus)
- Diamond Dust -Try to Sing Ver.- (with Tag, vocal)
- Seed

Reflec Beat limelight

- 1/3の純情な感情 (with Sota Fujimori as Venus)
- limelight world (with DWP)
- ビューティフル レシート (as Lucky Vacuum)
- Far Away (with Sota Fujimori as Venus)
- 威風堂々 -チュートリアルより- (as Rb. Conductor)
- Vallis-Neria

Reflec Beat Colette

- Chu☆Chu☆Tonight (with Sota Fujimori as Venus)
- Cosmic Hurricane -Try to Sing Ver.- (with Tag)
- Daily Lunch Special (as Lucky Vacuum)
- Freedom (with Sota Fujimori as Venus)
- Survival Games - Zeus Mix- (with Sota Fujimori as Venus)
- Unlimited Fire - Try to Sing Ver.- (with Tag, vocal)
- Wow Wow Venus (with Sota Fujimori as Venus)
- 三日月 (with Sota Fujimori as Venus)

=== Bemani Events ===
- Elemental Creation (with dj Taka, private Benami Academy, remixed in GitaDora as Elemental Creation (-Gitado Rock ver.))

=== Other works ===
- rainbow flyer (DJ Yoshitaka Remix) (found in beatmania IIDX 8th style - V-RARE 8)
- I'm In Love Again - DJ Yoshitaka Remix - (found in dj TakaA's album "milestone")
- CaptivAte ~裁き~(Sublime Techno Mix, performed in the beatnation summit ~beatmania IIDX premium Live~)
- Photongenic - DJ YOSHITAKA Remix- (found in L.E.D.'s album "電人K")
- Cyber Force - DJ Yoshitaka Remix- (found in Sota Fujimori's album "Synthesized")
- Is This Love?(This is LOVE mix) (found in Keiichi Ueno's album "Rewind!")
- Second Heaven -Samba, Samba, SomeBody Mix- (found in Ryu☆'s album "starmine")
- Juicy (with kors k as Lovers DJ Yoshitaka, found in kors k's album "Ways For Liberation")
