= Dance Dance Revolution Ultramix 2 =

2004 video game

- Cover art
- Developer: Konami Computer Entertainment Hawaii
- Publisher: Konami
- Series: Dance Dance Revolution
- Platform: Xbox
- Release: NA: November 18, 2004
- Genres: Music, Rhythm game Exergaming
- Modes: Single-player, Multiplayer

Dance Dance Revolution Ultramix 2, or simply Ultramix 2, is a music rhythm video game released on November 18, 2004, by Konami in American markets for the Microsoft Xbox. In line with other online-enabled games on the Xbox, multiplayer on Xbox Live was available to players until 15 April 2010. Ultramix 2 is now playable online again on the replacement Xbox Live servers called Insignia.

== Music ==
Dance Dance Revolution Ultramix 2 has a unique songlist compared to previous releases on other console systems. Rather than focusing on songs pulled from specific arcade versions, there is more emphasis on completely new material. This is also the first DDR release to feature licenses from A Different Drum records, a trend that would continue on throughout the Ultramix and DDR Universe series, as well as the arcade release of Dance Dance Revolution X. This is also the second DDR game to use downloadable content after its predecessor, allowing users to download song packs off of Xbox Live.

A large portion of the new songs were ported over to the Japanese PlayStation 2 release, Dance Dance Revolution Strike.

Song	Artist	Note
New Licensed Songs
"After All (Svenson & Gielen Remix Edit)"	Delerium	
"Brick House"	The Commodores	
"Burn For You"	Kreo	
"I'm in Heaven (Radio Version)"	Jason Nevins Presents Holly James	
"Jam On It"	Newcleus	
"Life Is A Game"	Arctic Blue	
"Play My Game"	Lightning	
"Rubberneckin' (Paul Oakenfold Remix Radio Edit)"	Elvis Presley	
"Sleepwalker"	Perfect Ending	
"Tough Enough"	Vanilla Ninja	
"Wherever You Are"	Laava	
A Different Drum Collaboration Songs
"Standing Still in Time"	Neuropa	
"Close Your Eyes"	daybehavior	
"Looking For You"	BOYJAZZ	
"skulk"	echo !mage	
"Mello"	Alien #Six13	
"C Squared"	Alien #Six13	
"Superstar (Nevarakka Mix)"	daybehavior	
New Dancemania Licensed Song
"Don't Stop"	Freestylers	
Returning Dancemania Licensed Songs
"DAM DARIRAM"	JOGA	
"DREAM A DREAM (MIAMI BOOTY MIX)"	CAPTAIN JACK	
"Flashdance...What a Feeling"	MAGIKA	
"MOONLIGHT SHADOW (New Vocal Version)"	MISSING HEART	
"NIGHT IN MOTION"	Cubic 22	
"VOL.4"	RAVERS CHOICE	
Returning Konami Originals
"321 STARS"	DJ SIMON	
"A"	DJ Amuro	
"Air"	DJ SIMON	
"B4U"	NAOKI	
"Dead End"	N&S	
"DROP OUT"	NW260	
"Leading Cyber"	dj TAKA	
"Love ♥ Shine"	Kosaka Riyu	
"MACHO GANG"	ANAL SPYDER	
"MAKE A JAM!"	U1	
"Make Your Move"	good-cool feat. JP Miles	
"My Summer Love"	Mitsu-O! with Geila	
"V (for EXTREME)"	TAKA	
"MAXX UNLIMITED"	Z	From DDRMAX2 Dance Dance Revolution 7thMix
New Original Songs and BEMANI Crossovers
".59 Remix"	Jesper Kyd	
"19, November"	good-cool	
"Altitude"	Kause & Konception	
"Baile le Samba"	Big Idea	
"Catch It!"	Total Science	
"Disco Break"	Art of Hot	
"EyeSpy"	or-if-is	
"Fly Through the Night"	Mr. T	
"Gyruss -Full Tilt-"	JT. 1Up	
"Hit n' Slap"	ASLETICS	
"I feel... (T.O.Y. Remix)"	T.O.Y.	
"In My Eyes (Midihead Remix)"	Midihead	
"Istanbul Café"	Jesper Kyd	
"La Cucaracha"	Big Idea	
"Love is Dreaminess"	L.E.D.-G vs Guhroovy fw/asuka	From Beatmania IIDX 5th Style (PS2 Version); Now first appeared in the original arcade version of Dance Dance Revolution SuperNOVA
"Luv to Me (Ucchie's Edition)"	tiger YAMATO	
"Make a Jam! (Dub/House)"	Big Idea	
"Midnight Special"	Love Machineguns	
"Monkey Punk"	Big Idea	New Konami original song Now first appeared in the original arcade version of Dance Dance Revolution SuperNOVA
"R10K"	tiger YAMATO	
"Red Room"	Jesper Kyd"	
"Ride on the Light (Hi Great Mix)"	Mr. T	
"Route 80s"	Sampling Masters MEGA	
"Starmine"	Ryu*	From Beatmania IIDX 4th Style; Now first appeared in the arcade game DanceDanceRevolution (2014)
"The Big Voyager -Infinite Prayer Reinterpretation-"	L.E.D.	
"Tittle Tattle"	ZONK	
"TOE JAM"	Big Idea	
"VJ Army"	good-cool	
"Zero-One"	Mr. T	
"G2"	Aya	
"MAX 300 (Super-Max-Me Mix)"	Jondi & Spesh	New Konami original song Now first appeared in the original arcade version of Dance Dance Revolution SuperNOVA

=== Downloadable content ===
Song Pack 7 soundtrack

No.	Song	Artist
1	"End of the Century"	No. 9
2	"Era (NostalMix)'	Taq
3	"I Feel... (Junk Circuit Mix)"	Junk Circuit
4	"La Senorita"	Captain.T
5	"Silent Hill"	Thomas Howard

Song Pack 8 soundtrack

No.	Song	Artist
1	"Balalaika, Carried with the Wind"	Julie Ann Frost
2	"Cosmic Cowgirl"	Toshio Sakurai
3	"In My Eyes (Neuromix)"	Neuropa
4	"Kind Lady (Interlude)"	Okuyatos
5	"More Deep (Ver.2.1)"	Togo Project feat. Sana

Song Pack 9 soundtrack

No.	Song	Artist
1	"Disabled the Flaw"	D-crew
2	"Forever Sunshine"	Chel Y.
3	"Jelly Kiss"	Togo Project feat. Sana
4	"O Jiya"	Asmat & Emi
5	"Regret"	Ryo & Q-Mex S

Song Pack 10 soundtrack

No.	Song	Artist
1	"Hack"	Komaba
2	"Love This Feelin'"	Chang Ma
3	"R5"	Tiger Yamato with Ultrabeatbox
4	"Real"	Aya
5	"Waverer (Slide Mix)"	Akira Yamaoka

Song Pack 11 soundtrack

No.	Song	Artist
1	"Diamond Jealousy"	Akira Yamaoka
2	"Guilty"	DJ Setup
3	"Helpless"	Taeko
4	"Hold On Me"	Tiger Yamato
5	"Open the P.A."	Akira Ishihara

Song Pack 12 soundtrack

No.	Song	Artist
1	"Backfire"	Chatanix
2	"Feel the Light"	Tomosuke
3	"Infinite"	Parallel Floaters
4	"Jack and Mark Get Busy!"	Distant Soundz Feat. MC Image
5	"Jet World"	Mutsuhiko Izumi

=== Music sampler ===
Dance Dance Revolution ULTRAMIX 2 LIMITED EDITION MUSIC SAMPLER

Soundtrack album by Various Artists
- Released: November 18, 2004
- Genre: Various Genres
- Length: 60:00
- Label: Konami
- Producer: Konami

Various Artists chronology
Dance Dance Revolution Extreme Limited Edition Music Sampler (2004)	Dance Dance Revolution ULTRAMIX 2 LIMITED EDITION MUSIC SAMPLER (2004)	Dance Dance Revolution Extreme 2 Limited Edition Music Sampler (2005)

Dance Dance Revolution Ultramix 2 Limited Edition Music Sampler is a bonus music CD featuring songs from the game. These samplers are available only to those who reserve the game before its release, typically at a GameStop or EB Games retail outlet. The CD contains tracks taken directly from the game as well as unique remixes done by Konami's in-house artists from a broad range of musical styles.

Known to Konami as V-RARE SOUNDTRACK-4 USA, the V-RARE moniker had first been used by Konami to release similar albums in Japan to commemorate Bemani game releases there and still are to this date are. In Japan the music CDs are usually bundled with a given game upon release. To date Konami has released 13 V-RARE discs in the US to promote various Dance Dance Revolution game releases and has released them through various video game and non-video game vendors such as GameStop, EB Games, Toys "R" Us, and Burger King.

Track	Song	Artist	Genre
1	air	DJ SIMON	HOUSE
2	Skulk	echo image	DANCE POP
3	Starmine	Ryu	HAPPY HARDCORE
4	fly through the night	Mr. T	TRANCE
5	G2	Aya	DRUM'N'BASS
6	Hit 'n' Slap	Asletics	HIPHOP
7	C Squared	Alien#Six13	BIG BEAT
8	Midnight Special	Love Machineguns	SKA
9	GYRUSS -FULL TILT-	JT.1Up	ARCADE REMIX
10	In My Eyes (Midihead Remix)	Midihead	PROGRESSIVE TRANCE
11	Love Is Dreaminess	L.E.D.-G vs GUHROOVY feat. Asuka	HAPPY HARDCORE
12	Standing Still in Time	Neuropa	SYNTHPOP
13	ZERO-ONE	Mr. T	ELECTROSHOCK
14	THE BIG VOYAGER -INFINITE PRAYER REINTERPRETATION-	L.E.D.	GOA TRANCE
15	Baile Le Samba	Big Idea	SAMBA
16	I feel... (T.O.Y. Remix)	T.O.Y.	TRANCE
17	Make A Jam! (Dub/House)	Big Idea	DUB/HOUSE
18	Superstar (Neverakka Mix)	Daybehavior	ATMOSPHERIC TRANCE
19	MAX 300 (Super-Max-Me Mix)	Jondi & Spesh	HARDCORE TECHNO/TRANCE
EXCLUSIVE BONUS TRACKS
20	Skulk (Album version)	echo image	DANCE POP
21	GYRUSS (Original theme)	Konami Classics	ARCADE
22	Superstar (Neverakka Mix) (Album version)	Daybehavior	ATMOSPHERIC TRANCE
23	C Squared (Album version)	Alien#Six13	BIG BEAT
24	In My Eyes (Midihead Supalong Mix)	Midihead	PROGRESSIVE TRANCE

Of the tracks that comprise this CD the more notable ones are MAX 300 (Super-Max-Me Mix) a remix of MAX 300 from the Japanese DDRMAX arcade and is also one song of many that marks the first time Konami has allowed outside talent to remix their in-house music, and In My Eyes (Midihead Remix) which introduces Bemani fans to Midihead, an artist that also goes by the name Monolithic and has been well received by DDR fans for his unique vocals and song structure.

Preceded by Dance Dance Revolution Ultramix	Dance Dance Revolution Ultramix 2; 2004	Succeeded by Dance Dance Revolution Ultramix 3
