= BeForU =

Japanese pop group

- Origin: Japan
- Genres: Pop, rock, trance
- Years active: 2000–2009
- Labels: Konami (2000–2006); Avex Trax (2006–2007); Gambit (2008–2009)
- Past members: Riyu Kosaka; Ayano Tachibana; Hiromi Nishiuchi; Megumi Fukushita; Noria Shiraishi; Risa Sotohana; Shiyuna Maehara; Yoma Komatsu; Miharu Arisawa; Sayaka Minami

BeForU was a Japanese pop girl group that performed music primarily for the Bemani series of rhythm games. Their 2000 debut song "Dive" was particularly notable as being the first Japanese-language pop song in the Dance Dance Revolution series. BeForU was produced by Naoki Maeda, one of the lead Konami musical producers. In 2006, the group made their major label debut under Avex Trax.

== Biography ==
=== The first generation ===
BeForU formed via a competition held on November 20, 2000, for a new J-pop group singing for Konami and their bemani series of video games, namely Dance Dance Revolution. The four winners chosen for their talent, ability and emphasis were Riyu Kosaka (then aged 15; born January 17, 1985), Noria Shiraishi (then aged 19; born September 12, 1981), Yoma Komatsu (then aged 26; born December 30, 1974) and Shiyuna Maehara (then aged 21; born November 30, 1979). Their first single "Dive", promoted widely throughout the J-Pop community, appeared in the 2001 French film Wasabi, made its first appearance on DDR Extra Mix, and its official debut on DDR 5th Mix.

The group name "BeForU", the winning result of a contest to name the group, is both a reference to the song "B4U" from DDR 4th Mix (composed and produced by Naoki Maeda) and a play on the words "before you." In another play on words, when BeForU originally formed, they had four members. In DDRMAX 6th Mix, BeForU released another song entitled "Firefly". Riyu also performed two solos which were then released on her first solo single, "true...". By DDR -Max 2- 7th Mix, Shiyuna was the only member of the group that had not received a solo in any Bemani game. As a group, they released another song entitled "Break Down!", that was later re-arranged for Guitar Freaks and DrumMania. Yoma debuted as a soloist with her song ever snow, her only solo song at her time she was in the group. Their eponymous first album BeForU was released on November 28, 2003. In 2004, Shiyuna, the only BeForU member without any solos, left the group to pursue other venues.

=== New members and Avex label ===
After Shiyuna's departure, BeForU had another contest for two new members. Somewhere along the line, there was a tie for either first or second place, so the grand total became six instead of five. The additions were Miharu Arisawa (born October 12, 1989), Sayaka Minami (born December 24, 1983), and Risa Sotohana (born January 28, 1988). These girls would form the second generation of BeForU known as BeForU NEXT. This new generation of BeForU debuted with their single "KI・SE・KI", released on November 18, 2004. This song was released as a CD-single and was featured in DDR Festival, both released on the same day. BeForU released a new album, BeForU II, on February 14, 2006. They also performed live for the first time, which was released later that year, on DVD as BeForU FIRST LIVE at ZeppTokyo 2006.

From that point, there were no releases on CD until a Bemani secret live event in which Riyu Kosaka and Noria revealed that they had signed onto the Avex label and would subsequently release a single each. In the following month, BeForU soon followed and released the single "Red Rocket Rising" on November 1, 2006. On December 22, 2006, BeForU released Get set Go!! BeForU Astronauts Set, which contained the song Get set GO!!. Their single "Strike Party!!!" followed, and was released on January 17, 2007. "Strike Party!!!" is featured during the ending credits of the 3rd season of the anime MAJOR. They also released an EP called 6Notes on March 3 that was under their Be+Wings Records label. Each of the 6 songs is a solo by each member. This CD was only available at live events and on their website and as of February 29, 2008, is no longer available.

BeForU's third album, BeForU III: Breaking Into the Probability Changes was released on March 14, 2007, under the Avex label. Following this, BeForU returned to Zepp Tokyo and performed live for BeForU LIVE 2007 at Zepp Tokyo and a DVD was released later. The next single released by the group was "Yoru Hanabi", released on July 11, 2007. Following its release, the group was quiet for the rest of that year, though Riyu continued to release solo singles.

On December 12, 2007, Riyu announced on her blog that due to illness, Miharu Arisawa would retire from the group. Similarly, Yoma Komatsu had chosen to depart for personal reasons. Their departures were effective immediately, and as such, these two members would be unable to perform at a scheduled concert on December 30, where a "graduation" took place for Noria and Risa Sotohana. These two members planned to move on to solo careers.

=== Third generation and Indefinite hiatus ===
On February 15, 2008, the Be+Wings site was reopened and it was announced that three new members would be joining the group: Ayano Tachibana (born March 8, 1988), Hiromi Nishiuchi (born March 8, 1989) and Megumi Fukushita (born April 24, 1984). A new song entitled "Kimi to Sora to Zutto" was announced at Riyu's Carnival and the 3rd Generation performed it, without Sayaka due to illness. Sayaka later announced that her recuperating was not going well, and that she had left the group.

The debut of the third generation, as well as Riyu's solo concert was filmed and released on DVD as BeForU/Four Piece Riyu Kosaka/Live 2008. The first official single from the group followed on September 10, 2008, but not on the Avex label. Instead, it released on their new label, Gambit (Sheeps Eyes). This single, "Shangri-La" was a cover of a Denki Groove song of the same name. Their next album, also titled Shangri-La but written in katakana (シャングリラ) this time, followed on October 8, 2008. There have been no recent news or updates about the group since 2009 and their website no longer exists. There has also been no mention of BeForU on members' blogs. It is assumed that BeForU was disbanded shortly after the release of シャングリラ.

With the release of Dance Dance Revolution X on December 24, 2008, in Japan, and worldwide in June 2009, "Chikara" is the only song from BeForU available in the game. In contrast, both SuperNova games featured a total of nine BeForU songs, plus many solo songs. With the release of Dance Dance Revolution X2 on July 7, 2010, in Japan, four of the group's songs returned: "Chikara" is available by default, while the remainder must be unlocked with the Enjoy Level system in Asia. All four songs are available by default on February 23, 2011, in Asia, and on the release date in North America and Europe, including in all subsequent Dance Dance Revolution games worldwide. This also applies to "Tears" and "Under the Sky", which are solo songs by Noria Shiraishi and Sayaka Minami, respectively.

== Discography ==
=== Albums ===
- BeForU - (2003.11.28)
- BeForU II - (2006.02.14)
- BeForU III ~Breaking Into The Probability Changes~ (2007.03.14)
- Shangri-La (シャングリラ) - (2008.10.08)

=== Singles ===
- KI・SE・KI - (2004.11.18)
- Red Rocket Rising - (2006.11.01)
- Get set GO!! ~BeForU astronauts set~ (2006.12.22)
- Strike Party!!! - (2007.01.17), #49 at Oricon Singles Chart
- Yohanabi (夜花火; Night Fireworks) - (2007.07.11)
- SHANGARI-LA - (2008.09.10)

=== Video games ===
BeForU has a total of 9 songs and one remix in the Dance Dance Revolution series.
In addition, two songs featuring a BeForU solo member other than Riyu Kosaka are present in the series.

| Song | Arcade game | | | | | | | | | |
|---|---|---|---|---|---|---|---|---|---|---|
| Song | 5th | MAX | MAX2 | Ex | DSF | SN | SN2 | X | X2 | Other |
| "Dive" | Yes | | | | Yes | | | | | |
| "Dive (more deep & deeper style)" | | Yes | Yes | Yes | | Yes | Yes | | | |
| "Firefly" | | Yes | Yes | Yes | Yes | Yes | Yes | | | |
| "Break Down" | | | Yes | Yes | | Yes | Yes | | Unlockable | Yes |
| "Graduation" | | | | Yes | | Yes | Yes | | Unlockable | Yes |
| "Tears" † | | | | Yes | | Yes | Yes | | Unlockable | Yes |
| "Chikara" | | | | | | Yes | Yes | Yes | Yes | Yes |
| "Freedom" | | | | | | Yes | Yes | | Unlockable | Yes |
| "Ki-Se-Ki" | | | | | | Yes | Yes | | | |
| "Morning Glory" | | | | | | Yes | Yes | | | |
| "Peace" | | | | | | Yes | Yes | | | |
| "Under the Sky" ‡ | | | | | | Yes | Yes | | Unlockable | Yes |
"Other" includes Dance Dance Revolution X3 vs. 2ndMix and newer. This table excludes solo releases by Riyu Kosaka.

† This song is credited to Naoki Underground featuring EK. EK refers to BeForU member Noria Shiraishi.
‡ This song is credited to Sayaka Minami (BeForU) with platoniX.
