= Ryutaro Nakahara =

Ryūtarō Nakahara 中原 龍太郎
- Also known as: Ryu☆ Seiryū (青龍); Kraken
- Born: October 1, 1979 (age 46); Fukuoka, Japan
- Genres: Happy hardcore; J-pop; trance
- Occupations: Musician; composer; arranger
- Years active: 2000–present
- Labels: Exit Tunes; Konami

Ryutaro Nakahara (Japanese: 中原 龍太郎, Hepburn: Nakahara Ryūtarō) born October 1, 1979, better known by his stage name Ryu☆, is a Japanese record producer, DJ, musician and arranger. In 2000, Ryu, along with kors k won a contest started by Konami, in which composers were to make music such that the winners would get their songs in the next Beatmania IIDX installment. Ryu's entry "Starmine" and kors k's "Clione" won the contest and both songs were featured in Beatmania IIDX 4th Style.

Ryu returned in Beatmania IIDX 9th Style with a remix of Dj taka's "Abyss", and composed more songs in 10th style onwards. Since then, Ryu has become a mainstay composer for Konami's Bemani series as well as a freelance musician. Ryu has become a part of beatnation records, which compose of Kors K, DJ Taka, L.E.D., Sōta Fujimori and DJ Yoshitaka.

He has numerous works outside of Konami as well, including "Orion" from HARDCORE TANO*C's "HARDCORE SYNDROME 2" album and remixes of "Caramelldansen" and "Caipirinha".
