= Beatmania IIDX 6th Style =

2001 video game

- Titlescreen of the CS version
- Developers: Konami (Arcade), Konami Computer Entertainment Japan (Console)
- Publishers: Konami (Arcade), Konami Computer Entertainment Japan (Console)
- Series: Beatmania IIDX & Bemani
- Platforms: Arcade & Sony PlayStation 2
- Release: Arcade: JP: September 28 2001; PlayStation 2: JP: July 18, 2002
- Genre: Music
- Modes: Single-player & Multiplayer
- Arcade system: Bemani Twinkle

Beatmania IIDX 6th Style is the sixth game in the beatmania IIDX series of music video games released in arcades by Konami in 2001 and features 40 new songs. 6th Style introduced new features such as letter grades (ranging from F to AAA) and the new hard mode (which removes the usual 80% lifebar requirement but makes the lifebar itself stricter).

The interface used by 6th Style is more modern looking than previous styles. The arcade version also switched the background movies to use a DVD instead of a VCD. 6th Style also introduced the current font design for the judgement labels.

== Gameplay ==
Beatmania IIDX tasks the player with performing songs through a controller consisting of seven key buttons and a scratchable turntable. Hitting the notes with strong timing increases the score and groove gauge bar, allowing the player to finish the stage. Failing to do so depletes the gauge until it is empty, abruptly ending the song.

== Music ==
Notable songs from this version include:

- DIVE ~INTO YOUR HEART~ - an English-language remix of BeForU's debut song by Naoki and Paula Terry.
- Night of Fire - a remix of the popular Eurobeat song.
- Flowtation & Fly Away - two songs by UK trance artist Vincent de Moor.
- PARAPARA PARADISE, Romeo & Juliet & Yesterday - Avex Trax Eurobeat licenses along with Night of Fire. All three of these songs have also been included in Konami's ParaParaParadise.
- 電人イェーガーのテーマ (Theme of DENJIN J) - the first song of LED's Denjin Jaeger series, which would later be extended with several other songs in future styles.

== Home version ==
A home version of 6th Style was released in Japan for the PlayStation 2 on July 18, 2002. As with other IIDX home releases, it contains all the new songs from the Arcade version, revivals from older styles, and new songs. The game also features "Drill Mode", an unlockable artwork gallery, Tatsujin movies, and the ability to view the videos from the songs. It was Last Series Developed From Konami Computer Entertainment Japan.
