= Beatmania IIDX 8th Style =

2002 video game

- Japanese cover art and title screen of the console version
- Developers: Konami (Arcade), Konami Computer Entertainment Studio (Console)
- Publisher: Konami
- Series: Beatmania IIDX & Bemani
- Platforms: Arcade & Sony PlayStation 2
- Release: Arcade: JP: September 27, 2002; PlayStation 2: JP: November 18, 2004
- Genre: Music
- Modes: Single-player & Multiplayer
- Arcade system: Bemani Twinkle

beatmania IIDX 8th Style is a 2002 arcade game released by Konami. A PlayStation 2 version was released in 2004.

== Gameplay ==
Beatmania IIDX tasks the player with performing songs through a controller consisting of seven key buttons and a scratchable turntable. Hitting the notes with strong timing increases the score and groove gauge bar, allowing the player to finish the stage. Failing to do so depletes the gauge until it is empty, abruptly ending the song.

== Music ==
This is the complete list of new songs from the arcade version of Beatmania IIDX 8th Style. Songs highlighted in green need to be unlocked. The Extra Stage is "桜", while the One More Extra Stage is "xenon".

Genre	Song	Artist
BIG BEAT	"abstract"	TaQ
INSTRUMENTAL	"airflow"	Mr.T
PSYCHEDELIC TRANCE	"ALIEN WORLD"	PINK PONG
DRUM 'N' BASS	"ALL RIGHT"	RAM
TRANCE	"Attitude"	Y&Co.
テクノ歌謡	"bit mania"	AKIRA YAMAOKA
EUROBEAT	"Blame"	good-cool feat.Jeff Coote
80's EURO	"Blown My Heart Away"	good-cool feat.Jeff Coote
EURO GROOVE	"CELEBRATE NITE"	N.M.R
EUROBEAT	"Colors -Y&Co. Eurobeat Remix-"	dj TAKA (remixed by 横田商会)
NU SKOOL	"DANCER"	DE VOL
TRANCE	"dissolve"	kobo
HYPER EUROBEAT	"Drivin'"	NAOKI feat. PAULA TERRY
GARAGE HOUSE	"dual control"	Mr.T
DEEP HOUSE	"FLUTE MAN"	SPARKER
TRANCE	"Foundation of our love"	dj TAKA feat.ASAKO
ELECTRO	"FUNKY BINGO PARADISE"	SAWASAKI YOSHIHIRO
PSYCHEDELIC TECHNO	"Giudecca"	D.J.SETUP
GIRL ROCK	"Halfway of promise"	Yu Takami feat. Shihori Nakane
ALTERNATIVE HOUSE	"Hormiga obrera"	Shawn The Horny Master
GOA TRANCE	"HYPER BOUNDARY GATE"	L.E.D.LIGHT
ELECTRO	"I.C.F.5800"	Reo Nagumo feat. Mayumii Shizawa
A.O.R.	"jelly kiss"	Togo project feat. Sana
RAVE	"LAB"	RAM
HARD CHANSON	"LOVE IS ORANGE"	Orange Lounge
2 STEP	"Luv 2 Feel Your Body"	Shoiciro Hirata
BEAT ROCK	"memories"	TAKA
EUROBEAT	"Monkey Dance"	Y&Co.
CUDDLECORE	"murmur twins"	yu_tokiwa.djw
TECHNO	"MUSIC TO YOUR HEAD"	SLAKE
HARDCORE BREAKBEATS	"OUTER LIMITS"	L.E.D.-G
DISCO	"PLEASE DON'T GO"	ASLETICS
TRANCE	"rainbow flyer"	dj TAKA
LATIN SWING	"Red Nikita"	Osamu Kubota
JAZZ FUNK	"Small clone"	Yu Takami
NU-FUSION	"Smoke"	Aya
TECHNO	"SPEED TRANCE MACH 3"	SAWASAKI YOSHIHIRO
TRANCE	"STAR DREAM"	PINK PONG
2 STEP	"Stick Around"	Megu with Scotty D
HOUSE	"thunder"	Lion MUSASHI
ROCKET BEATS	"TRIBAL MASTER"	NAPAKICK
TRANCE	"V35"	tiger YAMATO
HIP HOP	"WAR GAME"	ASLETICS
POPS	"World Wide Love"	MTO
J-TRANCE	"蒼い衝動"	NAOKI feat. YUKI
NU-NRG	"合体せよ!ストロングイェーガー!!"	L.E.D.
METAL HOUSE	"夜のサングラス"	good-cool feat. すわひでお
SPIRITUAL	"桜"	Reven-G
ELECTROSHOCK	"xenon"	Mr.T

== Home version ==
beatmania IIDX 8th Style: Direct port of the arcade version, with three preview songs from IIDX RED, as well as new songs, and some revivals.
