= Dancing Stage MegaMix =

2003 video game

- Developers: Konami, Bemani
- Publisher: Konami
- Series: Dance Dance Revolution, Dancing Stage
- Engine: DDRMAX2/EuroMix 2
- Platform: PlayStation 2
- Release: EU: May 30, 2003; AU: September 26, 2003
- Genres: Music, exercise
- Modes: Single-player, multiplayer

Dancing Stage MegaMiX is the fifth home release in the Dancing Stage series, a European version of the Dance Dance Revolution series of music video games. MegaMix was the first Dancing Stage game released on the Sony PlayStation 2 game console - and as with Dancing Stage EuroMix 2, MegaMix introduced many new features to Europe, such as Freeze Arrows, the Options menu, and a cleaner interface. Based largely on Dancing Stage EuroMix 2, MegaMiX was separated from the arcade game by a completely different track list of songs. The game was marketed by Konami as a family game and an exercise tool in efforts to make the niche series more mainstream.

== Gameplay ==
The gameplay of Dancing Stage MegaMiX is exactly like Dancing Stage EuroMIX 2, which had been released the previous year. Players who had not played EuroMIX 2 would be introduced to Konami's "Freeze Arrow" in this game, where players have to step on the correct arrow and hold their foot down until the game signaled to release it. This added more dynamics to the overall gameplay of MegaMiX and introduced situations where the player is forced to hold one foot down and hit a series of arrows solely with the other foot, maintaining balance at the same time. For beginner players MegaMiX was the first console title to feature the Beginner difficulty level, containing the absolute easiest steps possible for a song, never featuring anything beyond the most simple of step patterns, and utilizing an on-screen guide to assist

Dancing Stage MegaMiX uses the exact two-tiered scoring system that EuroMIX 2 does, but the judgment is less forgiving than EuroMIX 2, however there is a slightly larger window for perfects making it easier to pass a song overall.

As with EuroMIX 2, Dancing Stage MegaMiX was based on the Japanese release DDRMAX2: Dance Dance Revolution 7thMIX, but with modifications such as difficulty selection being done before the song instead of being offered before the song wheel (but being changeable with codes). Challenge Mode was replaced with Nonstop Mode, again to mimic EuroMIX 2. In total, the gameplay modes include the traditional game and nonstop modes, Workout Mode, Lesson Mode (containing tutorials), Training Mode (allowing the player to practice specific portions of songs), and Endless Mode, most of these modes and one additional song are unlocked through regular play.

=== Modifiers ===
Unlike EuroMIX 2, Dancing Stage MegaMiX implements the new Options Menu which debuted on DDRMAX: Dance Dance Revolution 6thMIX, allowing easier access to modifiers which required special codes entered on the difficulty selection screen on previous versions.

== Interface & graphics ==
The visual interface was completely overhauled for the console Dancing Stage series. For the first time the game played at 60fps and doubled the old video resolution from 320x240 to 640x480. Full motion background videos completely replaced the aging background animation engine, and Konami's signature dancing characters were omitted from the game for the first time on a European home version. Graphical karaoke style lyrics are displayed during some songs when there are spoken words. Occasionally videos are specifically made for a certain song, and in Dancing Stage MegaMiX's case, some licensed tracks contain their original music video in the background.

== Music ==
Dancing Stage MegaMiX song list
Song	Artist	Note
Love at First Sight	Kylie Minogue	
One Step Closer	S Club Juniors	
Shake UR Body	Shy FX & T-Power feat. Di	
When You Look At Me	Christina Milian	
A Little Less Conversation (Elvis vs JXL)	Elvis vs JXL	
Stealin' Beats	Kid Galahad	
The Lovecats	The Cure	
Arcade BEMANI crossovers (4 total)
BROKEN MY HEART	NAOKI feat. PAULA TERRY	from Dance ManiaX
I Was The One	good-cool	from beatmania IIDX 2nd Style
Let the beat hit em! BM IIDX version	Stone Bros.	from beatmania IIDX 2nd Style
Spin the disc	good-cool	from beatmania IIDX 5th Style
Returning Songs (6 total)
DROP THE BOMB -System S.F. Mix-	Scotty D.	from DDRMAX Dance Dance Revolution (NA PS2)
Groove 2001	Sho-T feat. Blenda	from Dance Dance Revolution Extra Mix
Kind Lady	OKUYATOS	from DDRMAX Dance Dance Revolution 6thMix (JP PS2)
PARANOiA KCET (clean mix)	2MB	from Dance Dance Revolution (JP PS1)
Share My Love	Julie Frost	from Dance Dance Revolution 4thMix (JP PS1)
SO IN LOVE	Caramel.S	from DDRMAX Dance Dance Revolution 6thMix (JP PS2)
Returning Arcade Songs (10 total)
BRILLIANT 2U (Orchestra-Groove)	NAOKI	from Dance Dance Revolution 2ndMix
CRASH!	mr.BRAIN & THE FINAL BAND	from Dancing Stage EuroMix 2 from Dance Dance Revolution Extreme
MEMORIES	NAOKI feat. PAULA TERRY	from Dancing Stage EuroMix 2 from Dance Dance Revolution Extreme
MY SUMMER LOVE	mitsu-O! with GEILA	from Dance Dance Revolution 4thMix
Remember You	NM feat. Julie	from Dance Dance Revolution 5thMix
Secret Rendez-vous	DIVAS	from DDRMAX2 Dance Dance Revolution 7thMix
Sweet Sweet ♥ Magic	jun	from DDRMAX2 Dance Dance Revolution 7thMix
TRIP MACHINE CLIMAX	DE-SIRE	from Dance Dance Revolution 4thMix
TSUGARU	RevenG vs DE-SIRE	from DDRMAX2 Dance Dance Revolution 7thMix
VANITY ANGEL	FIXX	from Dancing Stage EuroMix 2 from Dance Dance Revolution Extreme
Unlockable songs (1 total)
MAX 300	Ω	from DDRMAX Dance Dance Revolution 6thMix

=== Courses ===
Note: The colors indicate the preset difficulty of the songs in the courses; STANDARD is yellow, DIFFICULT is red, and EXPERT is green.

Dancing Stage MegaMiX course list
Course	Songs
EASY 1
EASY 1	One Step Closer
EASY 1	When You Look At Me
EASY 1	Remember You
EASY 1	Love at First Sight
EASY 1	Shake UR Body
EASY 2
EASY 2	Spin the disc
EASY 2	A Little Less Conversation (Elvis vs JXL)
EASY 2	Stealin' Beats
EASY 2	Let the beat hit em! BM IIDX version
EASY 2	The Lovecats
EASY 3
EASY 3	Kind Lady
EASY 3	MY SUMMER LOVE
EASY 3	Share My Love
EASY 3	SO IN LOVE
EASY 3	The Lovecats
NORMAL 1
NORMAL 1	MY SUMMER LOVE
NORMAL 1	I Was The One
NORMAL 1	When You Look At Me
NORMAL 1	Secret Rendez-vous
NORMAL 1	Share My Love
NORMAL 2
NORMAL 2	MEMORIES
NORMAL 2	CRASH!
NORMAL 2	Kind Lady
NORMAL 2	Let the beat hit em! BM IIDX version
NORMAL 2	VANITY ANGEL
NORMAL 3
NORMAL 3	Love at First Sight
NORMAL 3	SO IN LOVE
NORMAL 3	BROKEN MY HEART
NORMAL 3	Remember You
NORMAL 3	MEMORIES
HARD 1
HARD 1	VANITY ANGEL
HARD 1	DROP THE BOMB -System S.F. Mix-
HARD 1	Sweet Sweet ♥ Magic
HARD 1	CRASH!
HARD 1	TRIP MACHINE CLIMAX
HARD 2
HARD 2	Spin the disc
HARD 2	Shake UR Body
HARD 2	Stealin' Beats
HARD 2	Let the beat hit em! BM IIDX version
HARD 2	GROOVE 2001
HARD 3
HARD 3	BRILLIANT 2U (Orchestra-Groove)
HARD 3	TRIP MACHINE CLIMAX
HARD 3	PARANOiA KCET (clean mix)
HARD 3	TSUGARU
HARD 3	MAX 300

=== Notable music ===
- MAX 300 - First seen in DDRMAX: Dance Dance Revolution 6thMIX. As the title suggests, this song plays at 300 BPM, The song is usually considered to be the first 10-foot difficulty song, and is also notably the only unlockable song.

== Other versions ==
On September 26, 2003, Konami released a localized version of Dancing Stage MegaMiX to the Australian audience. The game was simply re-rated and there were no changes made that sets it apart from the European release.

== Reception ==
Reception

Aggregate score
Aggregator	Score
GameRankings	76%

Review scores
Publication	Score
Eurogamer	6/10
GameSpot	7.6/10
GamePlanet	4/5
TVG	6/10
All About Games	8.3/10
Contact Music	7/10
RewiredMind	3.5/5

Konami launched Dancing Stage MegaMiX with promotional ads in game magazines and videos. Konami attempted to reach the "underground" dancing crowd with the slogan "Take the Stage" and a television spot that displayed hip, young teens breakdancing on the dance mats to the songs in the game.

The general public took the new game with mixed emotions. While many praised the introduction of the Dancing Stage series on the PlayStation 2 and how it brought with it better graphics and smoother gameplay, others were chastising the meager song selection it brought to the table. Released against the home version of DDRMAX2 Dance Dance Revolution 7thMIX in Japan and the North American DDRMAX2 Dance Dance Revolution, it was considered the weakest of the three and hardcore European fans recommended importing one of the other two or picking up an older release instead. In the end, however, most people were happy with the game overall and gave it points for being one of the best Dancing Stage games at the time.

== See also ==
- DDRMAX2 Dance Dance Revolution 7thMix
- DDRMAX2 Dance Dance Revolution
