= Dancing Stage Fusion =

2004 video game

- PlayStation 2 cover art
- Developers: Konami, Bemani
- Publisher: Konami
- Series: Dance Dance Revolution
- Engine: 4thMix and Extra Mix (PS1); Extreme (USA) (PS2)
- Platforms: Arcade, PlayStation, PlayStation 2
- Release: PlayStation, PlayStation 2: EU: 5 November 2004; Arcade: EU: April 2005
- Genres: Music, Exercise
- Modes: Single-player, multiplayer
- Arcade system: Bemani Python

Dancing Stage Fusion is a music video game released by Konami for the European PlayStation and PlayStation 2 on 5 November 2004. In April of the following year, it was released as an arcade game.

== Gameplay ==
The main mode of Dancing Stage Fusion is the Game Mode, where up to two players compete for points over up to five songs. Each player can choose a different difficulty, with a substantial number of tweaks and settings that can be applied to make the game more or less difficult. Besides the Game Mode, a Workout mode is also included, which is targeted towards fitness or workout, as well as an Endless Mode which allows the players to dance continuously.

For the PlayStation 2 release of the game, EyeToy support is featured, as well as additional songs from artists like The Darkness, DJ Bobo and others. There is also an option to use two dance mats at the same time, or against each another in versus mode, with eight levels of varying difficulty.

== Music ==
The songlist for Dancing Stage Fusion received an improvement from its predecessors, containing considerably more difficult songs, as well as more songs overall.

The arcade release of the game consists of 49 songs, while the PlayStation 2 version consists of 54 songs, replacing five arcade licenses with ten console-only licenses. The soundtrack of the PlayStation release is a cut down list of the music available on the PlayStation 2 version, having only 20 of the PlayStation 2 version’s 54 songs.

Dancing Stage Fusion soundtrack
Licensed songs (Arcade & Console) (11 total)
Song	Artist	Note
"Danger! High Voltage"	Electric Six	
"Familiar Feeling"	Moloko	
"Freak Like Me" †	Sugababes	Cover of Adina Howard
"Good Luck"	Basement Jaxx feat. Lisa Kekaula	
"Heaven and Earth"	Pop!	
"It's Raining Men (Almighty Mix)"	Geri Halliwell	Cover of The Weather Girls
"Kids in America"	Kim Wilde	
"Mickey" †	Toni Basil	
"Move Your Feet" †	Junior Senior	
"Rappers Delight"	Sugarhill Gang	
"Sunlight" †	DJ Sammy	
SuperNOVA previews (3 total)
"Tomorrow Perfume"	DJ Taka	
"You're Not Here" ‡	Heather	
"Your Rain (Rage Mix)"	Akira Yamaoka feat. Mary Elizabeth McGlynn	
From DDR Extreme (11 total)
"321Stars" †‡	DJ Simon	
"A" ‡	DJ Amuro	
"A Stupid Barber" †	Sho-T	Debuted in the JP PS2 version
"Across the Nightmare"	Jimmy Weckl	
"Be Lovin"	D-Crew	
"Colors (For Extreme)"	DJ Taka	
"Destiny Lovers" ‡	Miyuki Kunitake	
"Paranoia Survivor" ‡	270	
"Sync (Extreme Version)" ‡	OutPhase	
"Un Deux Trois" ‡	SDM	Debuted in the JP PS2 version
"Xenon" ‡	Mr. T	
From DDRMAX2 (2 total)
"Kakumei" ("The Revolutionary Étude") †‡	DJ Taka with Naoki	Cover of Frédéric Chopin
"Try 2 Luv. U" †	S.F.M.P.	Debuted in the PS2 version
From DDRMAX (3 total)
"Candy☆" ‡	Luv Unlimited	
"Dynamite Rave (Down Bird Sota Mix)" ‡	Naoki	Debuted in the PS2 version
"Firefly"	BeForU	
From DDR 5thMix (4 total)
"Can't Stop Fallin' in Love (Speed Mix)" †	Naoki	
"Dive" †	BeForU	
"Healing Vision (Angelic Mix)" †	2MB	Debuted in the PS1 version
"Still In My Heart" †	Naoki	
From Dance Dance Revolution 4th Mix (1 total)
"Orion.78 (Civilization Mix)" †	2MB	Debuted in the PS1 version
From Dance Dance Revolution Solo 2000 (1 total)
"Trip Machine (Luv Mix)" ‡	2MB	
From DDR 3rdMix Plus (1 total)
"La Senorita Virtual" ‡	2MB	
From DDR 3rdMix (1 total)
"La Senorita"	Captain.T	
From DDR 2ndMix (4 total)
"AM-3P" †	KTz	
"Keep On Movin'" †	N.M.R	
"Make It Better (So-Real Mix)" ‡	Mitsu-O! Summer	Internet Ranking song
"Paranoia Max (Dirty Mix)" †	190	
From Dance Dance Revolution (2 total)
"Make It Better" †	Mitsu-O!	
"Trip Machine"	De-Sire	
Arcade-only songs (5 total)
"Believe"	Eddie.J	Cover of Cher
"Ladies' Night"	∠R	Cover of Kool & the Gang
"Like a Virgin"	tama_happytone	Cover of Madonna
"Tough Enough"	Vanilla Ninja	
"Waiting For Tonight"	P.A.T	Cover of Jennifer Lopez
Console-only songs (10 total)
"Chihuahua 2002"	DJ Bobo	
"Come Into My World" †	Kylie Minogue	
"Go West"	Pet Shop Boys	Cover of Village People
"Gotta Get Thru This" †	Daniel Bedingfield	
"I Believe in a Thing Called Love" †	The Darkness	
"OK"	Big Brovaz	
"Promises"	Kylie Minogue	
"Sexiest Man in Jamaica"	Mint Royale feat. Prince Buster	
"Someone like Me"	Atomic Kitten	
"Superstar"	Jamelia	
† indicates songs that are also on the PlayStation version.
‡ indicates songs that are locked in the PlayStation 2 version.

== See also ==
- Dance Dance Revolution Extreme
- Dancing Stage
- List of Dance Dance Revolution video games
