= Dancing Stage (video game) =

1999 video game

- Developer: Konami
- Publisher: Konami
- Series: Dance Dance Revolution
- Engine: 2ndMix (Arcade); 3rdMix (PlayStation)
- Platforms: Arcade, PlayStation
- Release: Arcade: EU: March 9, 1999; NA: March 9, 1999; PlayStation: NA: March 6, 2001
- Genres: Music, Exercise
- Modes: Single player, Multiplayer

Dancing Stage is a music video game, developed by Konami, released in European arcades on March 9, 1999. In North America, the game was released as Dance Dance Revolution on the same date, and it received a PlayStation port on March 6, 2001. It is the first international release of the game. The arcade version features 13 songs, with 11 of these available on the PlayStation port, while Dancing Stage Internet Ranking adds another three exclusive songs to arcades.

== Gameplay ==
The core gameplay involves the player stepping their feet to correspond with the arrows that appear on screen and the beat. During normal gameplay, arrows scroll upwards from the bottom of the screen and pass over a set of stationary arrows near the top (referred to as the "guide arrows" or "receptors", officially known as the Step Zone). When the scrolling arrows overlap the stationary ones, the player must step on the corresponding arrows on the dance platform, and the player is given a judgement for their accuracy of every streaked note.

== Music ==
All versions include the following songs:

- "AM-3P" by kTz
- "Boom Boom Dollar" by King Kong & D.Jungle Girls
- "Brilliant 2U" by Naoki
- "Brilliant 2U (Orchestra-Groove)" by Naoki
- "Have You Never Been Mellow" by The Olivia Project
- "Make It Better" by mitsu-O!
- "My Fire" by X-Treme
- "PARANOiA" by 180
- "Put Your Faith In Me" by UZI-LAY
- "Put Your Faith In Me (Jazzy Groove)" by UZI-LAY
- "Trip Machine" by De-Sire

"Butterfly" by Smile.dk and "Make It Better (So-Real Mix)" by mitsu-O! are exclusive to the arcade release.

180, kTz, mitsu-O! and UZI-LAY are pen names for Naoki Maeda. Songs with "Groove" or "Mix" in the title require certain criteria to be unlocked by the player.

Dancing Stage Internet Ranking was released exclusively in Europe. It adds another three licensed covers, credited with the original artists:

- "It's Like That" (cover of Run–D.M.C. vs. Jason Nevins)
- "Last Thing On My Mind by Step Ahead (cover of Steps)
- "Uh La La La" by Party All Night (cover of Alexia)
Dance Dance Revolution courses

No.	Nonstop	Songs
1	Simple Mix	"Have You Never Been Mellow"
1	Simple Mix	"Boom Boom Dollar"
1	Simple Mix	"El Ritmo Tropical"
1	Simple Mix	"Put Your Faith In Me"
2	Konami Mix	"Let Them Move"
2	Konami Mix	"Put Your Faith In Me"
2	Konami Mix	"Keep On Movin'"
2	Konami Mix	"Trip Machine"
3	Club Mix	"20, November D.D.R. Version"
3	Club Mix	"My Fire"
3	Club Mix	"Drop the Bomb"
3	Club Mix	"AM-3P"
4	Weird Mix	"Smoke"
4	Weird Mix	"Paranoia"
4	Weird Mix	"Get Up'n Move"
4	Weird Mix	"Afronova"
5	Pop Mix	"Keep On Movin'"
5	Pop Mix	"Dub I Dub"
5	Pop Mix	"I Believe In Miracles"
5	Pop Mix	"If You Were Here"
6	Party Mix	"Have You Never Been Mellow"
6	Party Mix	"El Ritmo Tropical"
6	Party Mix	"Make It Better"
6	Party Mix	"La Senorita"
7	Hard Mix	"Put Your Faith In Me (Jazzy Groove)"
7	Hard Mix	"Drop the Bomb"
7	Hard Mix	"Brilliant2U"
7	Hard Mix	"Dynamite Rave"
8	Random Mix	?
8	Random Mix	?
8	Random Mix	?
8	Random Mix	?

== Reception ==
Reception

Aggregate scores
Aggregator	Score
GameRankings	84%
Metacritic	90/100

It was a runner-up for GameSpot's annual "Best PlayStation Game" and "Best Music/Rhythm Game" awards, which went to Tony Hawk's Pro Skater 3 and Frequency, respectively.

== See also ==
- Dancing Stage
- Dance Dance Revolution

Preceded by nothing	Dance Dance Revolution; 2001	Succeeded by Dance Dance Revolution Konamix
