= Dance Dance Revolution Disney Mix =

2000 video game

- North American PlayStation cover art
- Developer: Konami Computer Entertainment Tokyo
- Publisher: Konami
- Series: Dance Dance Revolution
- Platforms: Arcade, Game Boy Color, PlayStation, Plug and Play
- Release: Arcade: JP: November 30, 2000; PlayStation: JP: November 30, 2000; NA: September 18, 2001; WW: September 28, 2001; Plug and Play: WW: December 12, 2006
- Genres: Music, exercise
- Modes: Single-player, multiplayer
- Arcade system: Bemani System 573 Digital

Dancing Stage featuring Disney's Rave (ダンシングステージフィーチャリングディズニーズレイブ, Danshingu Sutēji fīcharingu Dizunīzu Reibu) is a music video game released in Japan in arcades on November 30, 2000. On the same day, it was also released for the PlayStation, but under the name Dance Dance Revolution Disney's Rave (ダンスダンスレボリューションディズニーズレイブ, Dansu Dansu Reboryūshon Dizunīzu Reibu). It was later released in September 2001 North America as Dance Dance Revolution Disney Mix and in Europe and Australia as Dancing Stage Disney Mix. It is based on Konami's Dance Dance Revolution (DDR) series with animated Disney characters and electronic dance music remixes of past Disney songs. They also include a few non-Disney songs that were popular at the time of the game's release. It is considered to be one of the rarest DDR game released in arcades.

== Gameplay ==
Gameplay is typical to other 4th Mix generation DDR games. The game also features Dance Magic mode, an item battle mode using a tug of war style lifebar, where combos increase a gauge which sends modifiers to the other player. The mode was not seen on any future DDR game until it was revived as Battle mode on SuperNOVA.

== Releases ==
=== Arcade ===
The arcade release of Disney's Rave was historically available at a few Walt Disney Parks and Resorts locations, including Disneyland in Anaheim, California (at Innoventions) and Walt Disney World in Lake Buena Vista, Florida (at Innoventions West and Tomorrowland) The parks also carried other dance games which would eventually replace Disney's Rave, and conversely, Disney's Rave is also available at non-Disney locations.

=== Console ===
The PlayStation version was the only version officially released outside Japan. The non-Japanese versions had slightly different song lists and included an unlockable "Maniac" difficulty level that could be reached once "Basic" and "Trick" difficulties were completed for each song. A Game Boy Color version of the game was also released in Japan.

=== Plug and play ===
Konami partnered with Majesco to release Dance Dance Revolution Disney Mix as a plug and play TV game with dance pad on December 12, 2006. It was originally sold exclusively at Walt Disney Parks and Resorts. The 8-bit video game is single-player only, with Arcade and Free Play modes, and is built into the basic dance pad. The song list is limited to nine chiptune renditions of Disney music. The game requires four AA batteries and uses built-in composite cables to connect to a television.

== Music ==
The Disney games feature a total of 31 songs. The Japan-exclusive songs are licensed covers of non-Disney music, while the non-Japan exclusive songs are Konami original songs.

Standard songs	Also available on plug and play	† Not on Game Boy Color

Dance Dance Revolution Disney Mix soundtrack
Song	Artist	DJ	Note
"Mickey Mouse March (Eurobeat Version)"	DOMINO	Mickey Mouse	cover of The Mickey Mouse Club
"IT'S A SMALL WORLD"	AbeatC ALL STARS	Chip 'n' Dale	cover of Sherman Brothers
"Macho Duck"	DOMINO	Donald Duck	
"Zip-A-Dee-Doo-Dah"	DOMINO	Pluto	cover of James Baskett
"Mickey Mouse March (SUMMERTIME EXTENDED Version)"	DOMINO	Mickey Mouse	cover of The Mickey Mouse Club
"Chim Chim Cher-ee"	DOMINO	Huey, Dewey, and Louie	cover of Julie Andrews and Dick van Dyke
"D.D.D ! 〜Happy 65th Anniversary for Donald Duck〜"	THE ALFEE feat. Donald Duck	Donald Duck	
"IT'S A SMALL WORLD (Ducking Hardcore MIX)" †	♪♪♪♪♪	Donald Duck	cover of Sherman Brothers
"Supercalifragilisticexpialidocious"	Go Go Girls	Chip 'n' Dale	cover of Julie Andrews and Dick Van Dyke
"Mr.Bassman"	♪♪♪♪♪	Donald Duck	cover of Johnny Cymbal
"(Are You Ready) Do The Bus Stop" †	♪♪♪♪♪	Goofy	cover of Fatback Band
"Night of Fire"	NIKO	Huey, Dewey, and Louie	
"Fire" †	Combined	Huey, Dewey, and Louie	cover of Scooter
"Let's Twist Again"	Chubby Checker	Goofy	
Japan exclusives (11 total)
"ELECTRICAL PARADE (Retro Future MIX)"	♪♪♪♪♪	Goofy	cover of Perrey and Kingsley
"Surfin' U.S.A." †	♪♪♪♪♪	Mickey Mouse	cover of The Beach Boys
"Johnny B. Goode" †	♪♪♪♪♪	Chip 'n' Dale	cover of Chuck Berry
"Disco Inferno" †	♪♪♪♪♪	Huey, Dewey, and Louie	cover of The Trammps
"Twilight Zone" †	Zodiac	Goofy	cover of 2 Unlimited
"Superstition"	♪♪♪♪♪	Donald Duck	cover of Stevie Wonder
"Vacation" †	♪♪♪♪♪	Pluto	cover of Connie Francis
"Let's Groove"	♪♪♪♪♪	Mickey Mouse	cover of Earth, Wind & Fire
"The Bump" †	♪♪♪♪♪	Goofy	cover of Commodores
"Macarena"	2 Locos in a Room	Chip 'n' Dale	cover of Los del Rio
"I Want You Back"	♪♪♪♪♪	Pluto	cover of The Jackson 5
North America exclusives (6 total)
"B4U" †	NAOKI	Mickey Mouse	from DDR 4thMix and Konamix
"HIGHER" †	NM feat. SUNNY	Pluto	from DDR 4thMix and Konamix
"Let the beat hit 'em!" †	STONE BROS.	Goofy	from DDR Solo Bass Mix
"Midnite Blaze" †	U1 Jewel Style	Mickey Mouse	from DDR 4thMix (PS) and DDRMAX (AC/PS2)
"MY SUMMER LOVE" †	MITSU-O! with GEILA	Pluto	from Dance Dance Revolution 4thMix
"Share My Love" †	Julie Frost	Chip 'n' Dale	from DDR 4thMix (PS) and DDRMAX (AC/PS2)

== Reception ==
Reception

Aggregate scores
Aggregator	Score
GameRankings	72.95%
Metacritic	74/100

Review scores
Publication	Score
Electronic Gaming Monthly	5.5/10
GamePro	14.5/20
GameSpot	6.4/10
Jeuxvideo.com	14/20
Official U.S. PlayStation Magazine	4/5

Dance Dance Revolution Disney Mix garnered "mixed or average" reviews from professional critics, according to aggregate website Metacritic, although it was widely recommended to fans of Disney and the Dance Dance Revolution series. Kim Wild, in a 2017 piece for Retro Gamer, described Disney's video games in the late-1990s and early 2000s-period prior to Kingdom Hearts (2002) as uninventive, capitalizing on established trends such as Mario Kart-esque racing video games, skateboarding games, and platformers. Dance Dance Revolution Disney Mix, for example, was part of the popularity of dance pad-controlled games.

The most discussed aspect of Dance Dance Revolution Disney Mix was its track list, which divided critics. The inclusion of both Disney covers and unrelated songs was appreciated as diverse by Jeuxvideo.com writer Pilou and Official U.S. PlayStation Magazine reviewer Joe Rybicki, while Jeff Gerstmann of GameSpot found it an "odd mix". David Smith was enthusiastic towards the Disney songs, elaborating that their amalgamation of child-like lyrics and hard techno styles separated the game from other DDR games. Less positively, they were considered mediocre by Electronic Gaming Monthly's Chris Johnston and "awful Eurobeat remixes" by Gerstmann. Joe Rybicki enjoyed the non-Disney tracks more, particularly "Let's Twist Again" and cuts that were also in Japanese versions of other DDR games, arguing players would have to be Disney fans to enjoy dancing to the Disney renditions. The tracks were unfavorably compared to previous DDR games by Gerstmann, who found them "a little too similar to be exciting" which went against the "charm" of DDR games, and Miss Spell of GamePro, who opined they were not as "infectious" as other DDR titles. Miss Spell cited "Chim Chim Cheree” and "It's a Small World (Ducking Hardcore Mix)" as the weakest songs.

In terms of difficulty, critics summarized Normal and Trick was really easy and lacked any "feverish energy" in the step patterns, while Maniac was the only one to give adult DDR players a challenge. Electronic Gaming Monthly's Chris Johnston argued the game had little replay value due its small amount of songs, not helped by the Disney covers being forgettable. Modes such as two-player, Diet and Dance Magic were highlighted by Rybicki and Jeuxvideo.com writer Pilou, while Johnston disliked Dance Magic as "unbalanced and short-lived". Gerstmann and Pilou found the backgrounds un-noticeable and sufficing for the function they serve, although Gerstmann found the animation "a bit choppy". On the other hand, Miss Spell called them out as too stilted for a late-era PlayStation title with an animation license, and resulting in some steps accidentally camouflaging.
