= Dancing Stage =

1999 Video game

Dancing Stage is a series of music video games developed and published by Konami. It is a spin-off of Dance Dance Revolution for the European market as well as a few Japanese titles. Games were released for arcade, PlayStation, PlayStation 2 and Wii.

== European releases ==
Release timeline
1999	Dancing Stage
1999	Dancing Stage Internet Ranking
1999	Dancing Stage Solo (cancelled)
2000	Dancing Stage EuroMix
2001
2002	Dancing Stage EuroMix 2
2003
2004
2005	Dancing Stage Fusion
2006	Dancing Stage SuperNova
2007
2008	Dancing Stage SuperNova 2 (cancelled)

=== Dancing Stage ===
Dancing Stage is a music video game, developed by Konami, released in arcades on March 9, 1999. This game was released as Dance Dance Revolution in North America. It includes 13 songs: nine composed by Naoki Maeda, and four licenses. It uses the Dance Dance Revolution 2ndMix engine. In North America, the game received a PlayStation port, which omits "Butterfly" and "Make It Better (So-Real Mix)". Songs in the arcade version include:

- "AM-3P" by kTz
- "Boom Boom Dollar" by King Kong & D.Jungle Girls
- "Brilliant 2U" by Naoki
- "Brilliant 2U (Orchestra-Groove)" by Naoki
- "Butterfly" by Smile.dk
- "Have You Never Been Mellow" by The Olivia Project
- "Make It Better" by mitsu-O!
- "Make It Better (So-Real Mix)" by mitsu-O!
- "My Fire" by X-Treme
- "PARANOiA" by 180
- "Put Your Faith In Me" by UZI-LAY
- "Put Your Faith In Me (Jazzy Groove)" by UZI-LAY
- "Trip Machine" by De-Sire

180, kTz, mitsu-O! and UZI-LAY and are pen names for Naoki Maeda. Songs with "Groove" or "Mix" in the title require certain criteria to be unlocked by the player.

Dancing Stage Internet Ranking was released exclusively in Europe. It adds another three licensed covers, credited with the original artists:

- "It's Like That" (cover of Run–D.M.C. vs. Jason Nevins)
- "Last Thing On My Mind by Step Ahead (cover of Steps)
- "Uh La La La" by Party All Night (cover of Alexia)

=== Dancing Stage EuroMix ===
Dancing Stage EuroMix was released in 2000, and is based on the Dance Dance Revolution 3rdMix engine. It includes 28 tracks and can be expanded to a total of 34 tracks with Internet Ranking enabled. Contrary to 3rdMix, EuroMix does not use a PC Card. The game's console port was released for PlayStation on June 1, 2001 and contains 24 songs. It removes the Dancemania licenses and all but one song added in the Internet Ranking version, but adds five Konami Original songs.

=== Dancing Stage EuroMix 2 ===
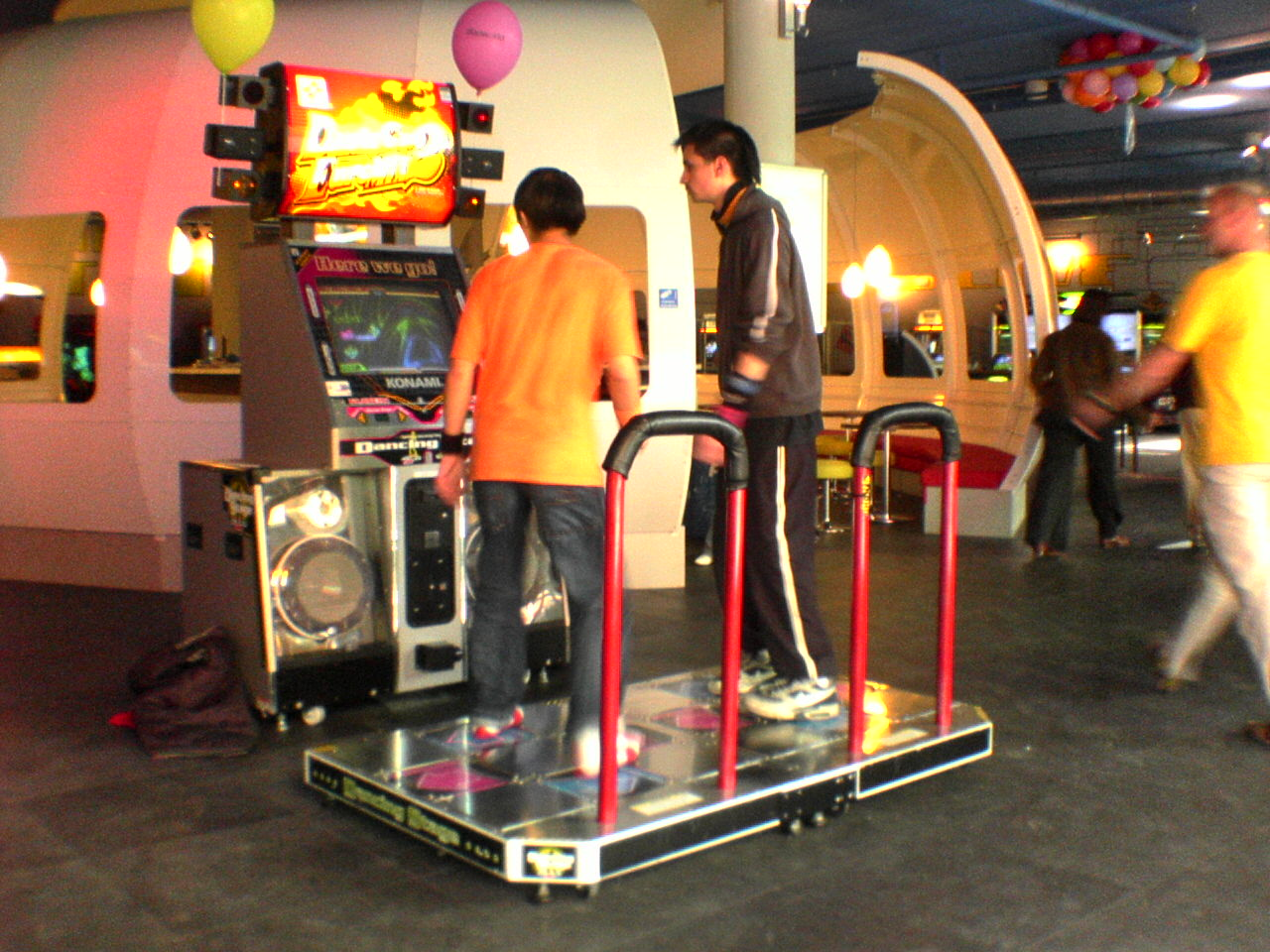
Dancing Stage EuroMix 2 arcade machine

Dancing Stage EuroMix 2 was released in 2002, and is based on the DDRMAX2 Dance Dance Revolution 7thMix engine. It includes 68 tracks, of which 52 are new and 16 are Konami originals from EuroMix. EuroMix 2 requires a PC Card and omits the Internet Ranking feature.

In contrast to EuroMix, there is no home version of EuroMix 2. However, Dancing Stage MegaMix features a similar interface. This game features 28 songs, including 11 Konami originals from EuroMix 2 and a remix of "Let the beat hit em!"

Complete song list

Song	Artist	Note
Licensed songs
"5, 6, 7, 8"	STEPS	from the album Step One
"AARON'S PARTY (COME GET IT)"	AARON CARTER	
"CARIBBEAN QUEEN"	BILLY OCEAN	from the album Suddenly
"COTTON - EYE JOE	REDNEX	from the album Sex & Violins
"DON'T TRY TO STOP IT"	ROMAN HOLIDAY	
"I WANT YOU TO WANT ME"	SOLID HARMONIE	from the album Solid HarmoniE
"LIVING IN AMERICA"	ROSE & JOHN	also in DDRMAX2; from Dancemania SPEED 8
"LOVE YOU LIKE A FOOL"	JESSICA FOLKER	from the album Dino
"NEVER ENDING STORY (Power Club Vocal Mix)"	DJ AC/DC	also in 5thMix; from Dancemania X8
"NEVER GONNA MAKE (FACTORY DANCE TEAM MIX)"	MORGANA	also in 4thMix; from Dancemania X6
"NORI NORI NORI"	JUDY CRYSTAL	also in DDRMAX; from Dancemania HAPPY PARADISE 2
"SO DEEP (PERFECT SPHERE REMIX)"	SILVERTEAR	also in DDRMAX; from The Best Of World Trance FantasiA
"STOMP"	STEPS	from the album Buzz
"TEST MY BEST"	E-ROTIC	also in 5thMix; from Dancemania X8
"That Was Then, This Is Now"	HI FIVE	from the album Faithful
"The Centre Of The Heart (STONEBRIDGE CLUBMIX)"	Roxette	also in DDRMAX; from the album Room Service
"THE REFLEX	DURAN DURAN	also in DDRMAX2; from Dancemania 80's TWO
"THE VIBE IS RIGHT"	RUBY TURNER	from the album The Other Side
"WWW.BLONDE GIRL (MOMO MIX)"	JENNY ROM	also in DDRMAX; from Dancemania SPEED BEST 2001
Konami Original songs
"20, NOVEMBER (D.D.R. VERSION)"	N.M.R feat. DJ nagureo	from Dance Dance Revolution 2ndMix
"AFRONOVA"	RE-VENGE	from Dance Dance Revolution 3rdMix
"B4U"	NAOKI	from Dance Dance Revolution 4thMix
"B4U (B4 ZA BEAT MIX)"	NAOKI	from DDRMAX2 Dance Dance Revolution 7thMix
"BURNIN' THE FLOOR"	NAOKI	from Dance Dance Revolution 4thMix
"CAN'T STOP FALLIN' IN LOVE"	NAOKI	from Dance Dance Revolution Solo 2000
"CAN'T STOP FALLIN' IN LOVE (SPEED MIX)"	NAOKI	from Dance Dance Revolution 5thMix
"CANDY★"	Luv unlimited	from DDRMAX Dance Dance Revolution 6thMix
"CRASH!"	mr.BRIAN & THE FINAL BAND	New Konami Original
"D2R"	NAOKI	from DDRMAX2 Dance Dance Revolution 7thMix
"DEAD END"	N&S	from Dance Dance Revolution 3rdMix
"DESTINY"	NAOKI feat.PAULA TERRY	from DDRMAX2 Dance Dance Revolution 7thMix
"DYNAMITE RAVE"	NAOKI	from Dance Dance Revolution 3rdMix
"ECSTASY"	d-complex	from Dance Dance Revolution 5thMix
"END OF THE CENTURY"	NO.9	from Dance Dance Revolution 3rdMix
"exotic ethnic"	RevenG	from DDRMAX Dance Dance Revolution 6thMix
"Groove 2001"	Sho-T feat. Brenda	from Dance Dance Revolution Extra Mix
"Healing Vision (Angelic mix)"	2MB	from Dance Dance Revolution 5thMix (PS)
"HIGHER"	NM feat. SUNNY	from Dance Dance Revolution 4thMix
"HYPNØTIC CRISIS"	Blue Destroyers	from Dance Dance Revolution 4thMix
"Jam Jam Reggae (AMD SWING MIX)"	RICE.C feat. jam master '73	from Dance Dance Revolution 3rdMix
"KEEP ON MOVIN'"	N.M.R	from Dance Dance Revolution 2ndMix
"La Senorita"	CAPTAIN.T	from Dance Dance Revolution 3rdMix
"Let the beat hit 'em!"	Stone Bros.	from Dance Dance Revolution Solo BASS MIX
"LET THEM MOVE"	N.M.R	from Dance Dance Revolution 2ndMix
"Look To The Sky"	SySF. feat.ANNA	from Dance Dance Revolution 5thMix (PS)
"LOVE THIS FEELIN'"	Chang Ma	from Dance Dance Revolution 2ndRemix (PS)
"LUV TO ME (AMD MIX)"	DJ KAZU feat. tiger YAMATO	from Dance Dance Revolution 3rdMix
"MAKE A JAM!"	U1	from Dance Dance Revolution (JP PS)
"MAX 300"	Ω	from DDRMAX Dance Dance Revolution 6thMix
"MEMORIES"	NAOKI feat. PAULA TERRY	New Konami Original
"MY SUMMER LOVE"	mitsu-O! with GEILA	from Dance Dance Revolution 4thMix
"PARANOiA KCET (clean mix)"	2MB	from Dance Dance Revolution (JP PS)
"rain of sorrow"	NM feat. EBONY FAY	from DDRMAX2 Dance Dance Revolution 7thMix
"PARANOiA Rebirth"	190'	from Dance Dance Revolution 3rdMix
"Remember You"	NM feat. Julie	from Dance Dance Revolution 5thMix
"Secret Rendez-vous"	DIVAS	from DDRMAX2 Dance Dance Revolution 7thMix
"Silent Hill"	THOMAS HOWARD	from Dance Dance Revolution 3rdMix
"TRIP MACHINE (luv mix)"	2MB	from Dance Dance Revolution 2ndRemix (PS)
"TRIP MACHINE CLIMAX"	DE-SIRE	from Dance Dance Revolution 4thMix
"TSUGARU"	RevenG VS. DE-SIRE	from DDRMAX2 Dance Dance Revolution 7thMix
"VANTIY ANGEL"	FIXX	New Konami Original
BEMANI crossover songs
"AFRONOVA PRIMEVAL"	8-bit	from Dance Maniax
"DXY!"	TaQ	from beatmania IIDX 4th Style
"Electro Tuned (the SubS mix)"	TaQ	from beatmania IIDX 2nd Style
"era(nostalmix)"	TaQ	from beatmania IIDX 3rd Style
"HYSTERIA 2001"	NM	from beatmania 6thMix -THE UK UNDERGROUND MUSIC-
"never let you down"	good-cool	from beatmania IIDX 3rd Style
"Spin the disc"	good-cool	from beatmania IIDX 5th Style

=== Dancing Stage Fusion ===
Dancing Stage Fusion is the first arcade release to be powered by the PlayStation 2 through a Bemani Python board. Despite the improved hardware, this game has fewer songs than its predecessor. Fusion features 49 songs, of which ten were available in previous Dancing Stage arcade releases, ten are from the arcade release of Dance Dance Revolution Extreme and seven are from older Japanese arcade releases. The remaining 21 songs premiered in Fusion: six are Konami Originals that later appeared in Dancing Stage SuperNova, while 15 are licenses that do not return in later arcade releases, with the exception of "Waiting For Tonight" by P.A.T's reappearance in Dance Dance Revolution SuperNova 2 and Dance Dance Revolution X.

=== Dancing Stage SuperNova ===
Dancing Stage SuperNova used the Bemani Python 2 board.

=== Console exclusives ===
- Dancing Stage Disney Mix is a direct port of Dance Dance Revolution Disney Mix, the American equivalent of the Japanese Dancing Stage featuring Disney's Rave. It was released on September 28, 2001, for the PlayStation.
- Dancing Stage Party Edition is a port of the American Dance Dance Revolution Konamix, with the addition of 5 licensed songs and the removal of 6 Konami Original songs for a total of 51 songs. It was released on November 15, 2002.
- Dancing Stage Unleashed is the European counterpart to the North American Dance Dance Revolution Ultramix series for the Xbox console. Three games were released annually from 2004 to 2006: Unleashed, Unleashed 2 and Unleashed 3, each with exclusive songs replacing some of the Ultramix songs. No European counterpart to Ultramix 4 was released. These games cannot be played on the Xbox 360 or newer consoles.
- Dancing Stage Fever is the second European DDR game to be released for the PlayStation 2, although a port for PlayStation was also released. The PS2 edition uses a recolored DDRMAX2 engine with an aqua blue background complemented with star motifs instead of black and gray, while the PS edition uses a recolored DDR 4thMix engine. Also, the PS edition omits freeze arrows and full motion videos.

The PlayStation 2 edition has 29 songs: 8 licenses, 16 Konami originals (of which 14 are also on Dancing Stage SuperNova for arcades) and 5 Bemani crossovers (of which 4 are also on Dancing Stage SuperNova for arcades). The PlayStation edition only features 15 of these songs: 5 licenses, 8 Konami originals and 2 Bemani crossovers.

All licensed songs, with one exception, are exclusive to Fever. Both Fever releases include "All That She Wants", "Cool for Cats", "One Step Beyond" and "Virtuality" (by VBirds). On the PlayStation 2, these songs feature their music video, except for "Cool for Cats". The "Virtuality" music video notably shows the VBirds members dancing on flying dance pads to the rhythm of the arrows shown on screen. The PlayStation 2 version also exclusively features "Come On Eileen", "Teenage Kicks" (with its music video) and "The Boys Are Back in Town". "Wannabe" was once exclusive to both Fever releases, but it was later included on Dance Dance Revolution Party Collection.

- Dancing Stage Universe is the European counterpart to the North American Dance Dance Revolution Universe series for the Xbox 360. Dancing Stage Universe was released in 2007 in Europe and Australia, while Universe 2 was released in 2008 for Europe only. Both games feature exclusive songs, replacing some of the North American songs. No European counterpart to Dance Dance Revolution Universe 3 was released, as Konami launched a Chinese edition of Universe 3 in 2009 instead. These games cannot be played on the Xbox One or newer consoles.
- Dancing Stage SuperNova 2 was originally meant to complement the planned arcade release of the same name. The arcade version was cancelled, however, making this a console exclusive.

== Japanese releases ==
=== Dancing Stage featuring True Kiss Destination ===
Dancing Stage featuring True Kiss Destination
- The cover art for the Japanese PlayStation port of True Kiss Destination.
- Developer: Konami
- Publisher: Konami
- Series: Dance Dance Revolution; Bemani
- Engine: Dance Dance Revolution
- Platforms: Arcade, PlayStation
- Release: Arcade: JP/AS: July 27, 1999; PlayStation: JP: December 9, 1999
- Genres: Music & Exercise
- Modes: Single-player & Multiplayer
- Arcade system: Bemani System 573 Analog

Dancing Stage Featuring True Kiss Destination (ダンシングステージフィーチャリングトゥルーキスデスティネーション, Danshingu Suteji Fīcharingu Tourū Kisu Desutinēshon) is the first "Dancing Stage" title of the Dance Dance Revolution series released in Japan and other parts of Asia on July 27, 1999. The Dancing Stage games in Japan all deviate away from the main DDR series of games and for True Kiss Destination, it features a themed set of music by the Japanese group of the same name as well as original music from Konami's in house artists.

On December 9, 1999, Konami released the game on the Sony PlayStation. It was part of their "Dance Simulation" series of titles for the PlayStation.

This game notably includes the songs "Celebrate Nite" and "Sexy Planet", credited to aliases of Naoki Maeda, which returned in Dance Dance Revolution Solo 2000 and later Dance Dance Revolution 4thMix Plus. With the exception of DDRMAX Dance Dance Revolution 6thMix, these songs were subsequently kept in every main DDR release, including the current title, Dance Dance Revolution World.

=== Dancing Stage featuring Dreams Come True ===
Dancing Stage featuring Dreams Come True
- PlayStation cover art
- Developer: Konami
- Publisher: Konami
- Series: Dance Dance Revolution; Bemani
- Engine: DDR, DDR PlayStation
- Platforms: Arcade, PlayStation
- Release: Arcade: JP: December 25, 1999; PlayStation: JP: April 20, 2000
- Genres: Music, Exercise
- Modes: Single-player, Multiplayer
- Arcade system: Konami System 573

Dancing Stage featuring Dreams Come True (ダンシングステージフィーチャリングドリームズカムトゥルー, Danshingu Sutēji fīcharingu Dorīmuzu Kamu Tourū) is the second Japanese Dancing Stage video game. The gameplay is similar to Dance Dance Revolution and it has songs performed by the J-Pop group, Dreams Come True.
