= System 573 =

Arcade system board by Konami

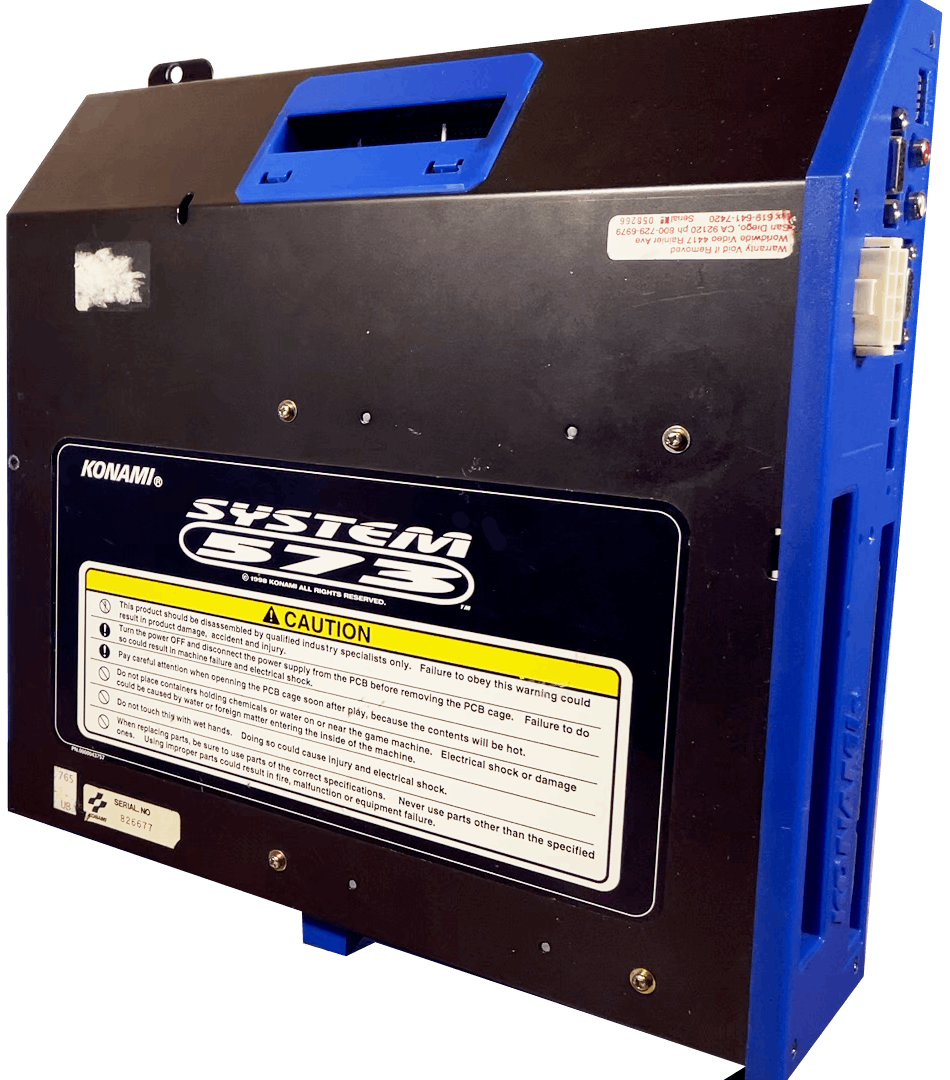
- System 573 with a blue and black case
- Developer: Konami
- CPU: MIPS R3000A @ 33.8688 MHz

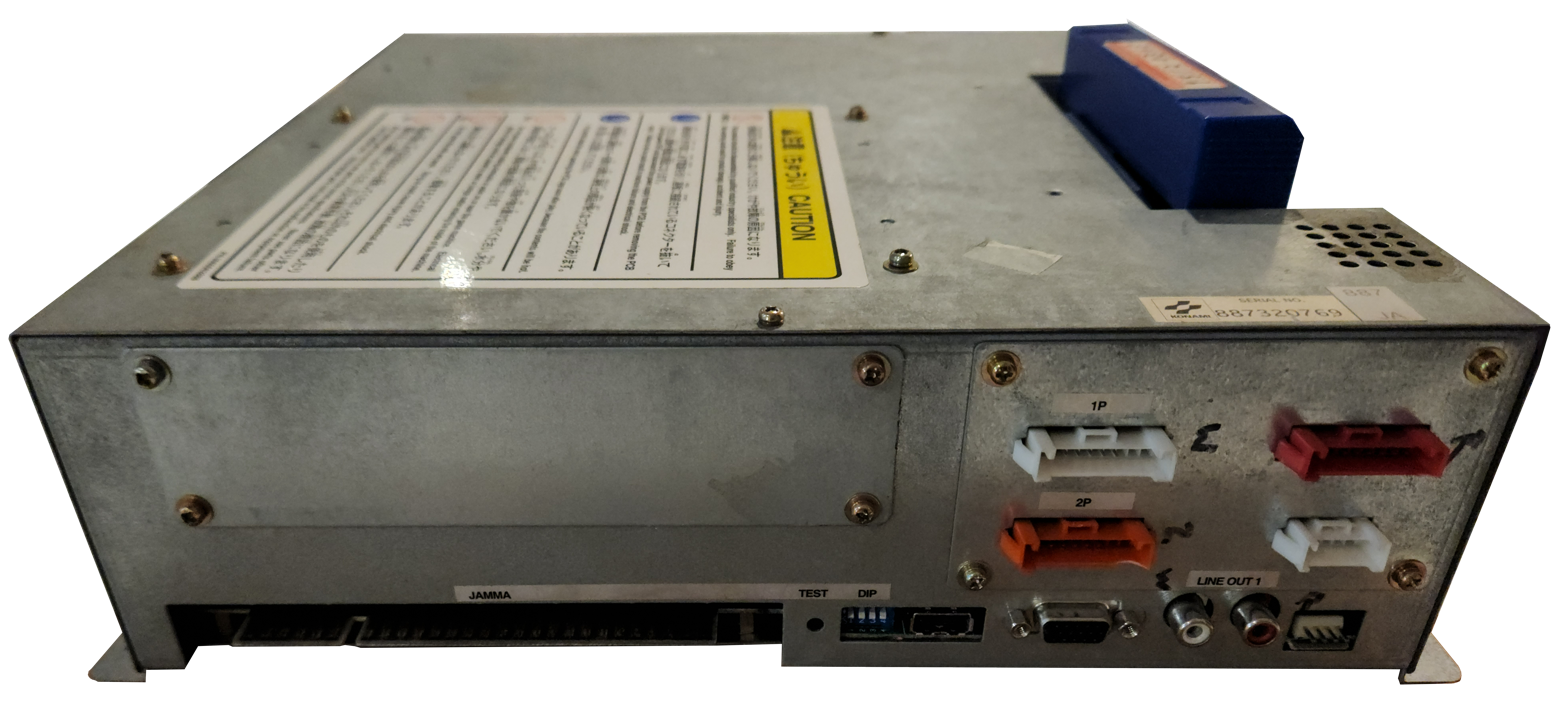
BEMANI System 573 in a silver case design (as used in Dance Dance Revolution)

The System 573 is an arcade system board made by Konami based on the original PlayStation. The hardware was used primarily for Konami's Bemani series of music video game arcades, including the popular Dance Dance Revolution series introduced in 1998. The System 573 is available is configurable with various expansion IO boards to add extra input or output, such as the analog and digital I/O boards for Dance Dance Revolution and other Bemani games. Systems with these IO boards are often called System 573 Analog and System 573 Digital respectively. There is another variant called the System 573 Satellite Terminal which allows for up to eight cabinets to be networked to a central one.

The name of the board is rooted in Japanese wordplay; each number in Japanese can be read with a number of different names, with Konami's name being one of many possible readings for "five-seven-three."

== Technical specifications ==
- Central processor: 33.8688 MHz MIPS R3000A RISC processor, 4KB cache.
- Memory: 4MB of EDO work RAM, 2MB VRAM, 512KB sound RAM.
- Storage: ATAPI CD-ROM drive, 16MB flash storage, 16MB PC-CARD flash storage.
- Sound processor: PlayStation SPU, MAS 3507-D MPEG 1/2 decoder chip for decoding 573 Digital game audio.
- I/O processor: Hitachi H8/3644 MCU for JVS functions.
- Screen resolution: 256x224p or 640x480i.

The System 573 uses the same system design as the original Sony PlayStation but with a few upgrades. Notably the 573 uses double the work RAM and video RAM and is missing the CD controller from the PlayStation. Also added was an IDE port, RTC with battery backed SRAM, dedicated JAMMA and JVS interfaces, a security cart which could be used to easily add basic expansion I/O hardware and dual PCMCIA slots, although these are only wired up as memory devices and cannot be used for I/O cards.

The System 573 exists in several configurations, sharing the same base motherboard but being packaged into various cases and with addon IO expansions for different games. Such configurations include:

- BEMANI Analogue - A community name for System 573 rhythm games using a 20-bit output board. Games on this system use CD-Audio to stream game music.
- BEMANI Digital - Another variation which uses an expansion board with an FPGA and MP3 decoder to stream encrypted audio from the CD drive (or from integrated RAM for song previews) to stream game music. It also added a digital ID, a RS232 port and network ports using an ARCnet physical interface.
- Fishing Board - A system 573 which uses a blue and black case design but has an extra IO board for use with the fishing reel control input.
- Gun Board - A 573 which has an integrated control board for use with Gunmania, which uses real BB bullets and other mechanical parts for gameplay.

Konami's e-Amusement service was available on some games with the use of a separate network PCB, which plugged into the System 573 using the lower PCMCIA slot. It used a system-on-a-chip design and ran a customised version of Toshiba's NetNucleus software to connect to the service and download data onto a 20GB IDE hard disk drive.

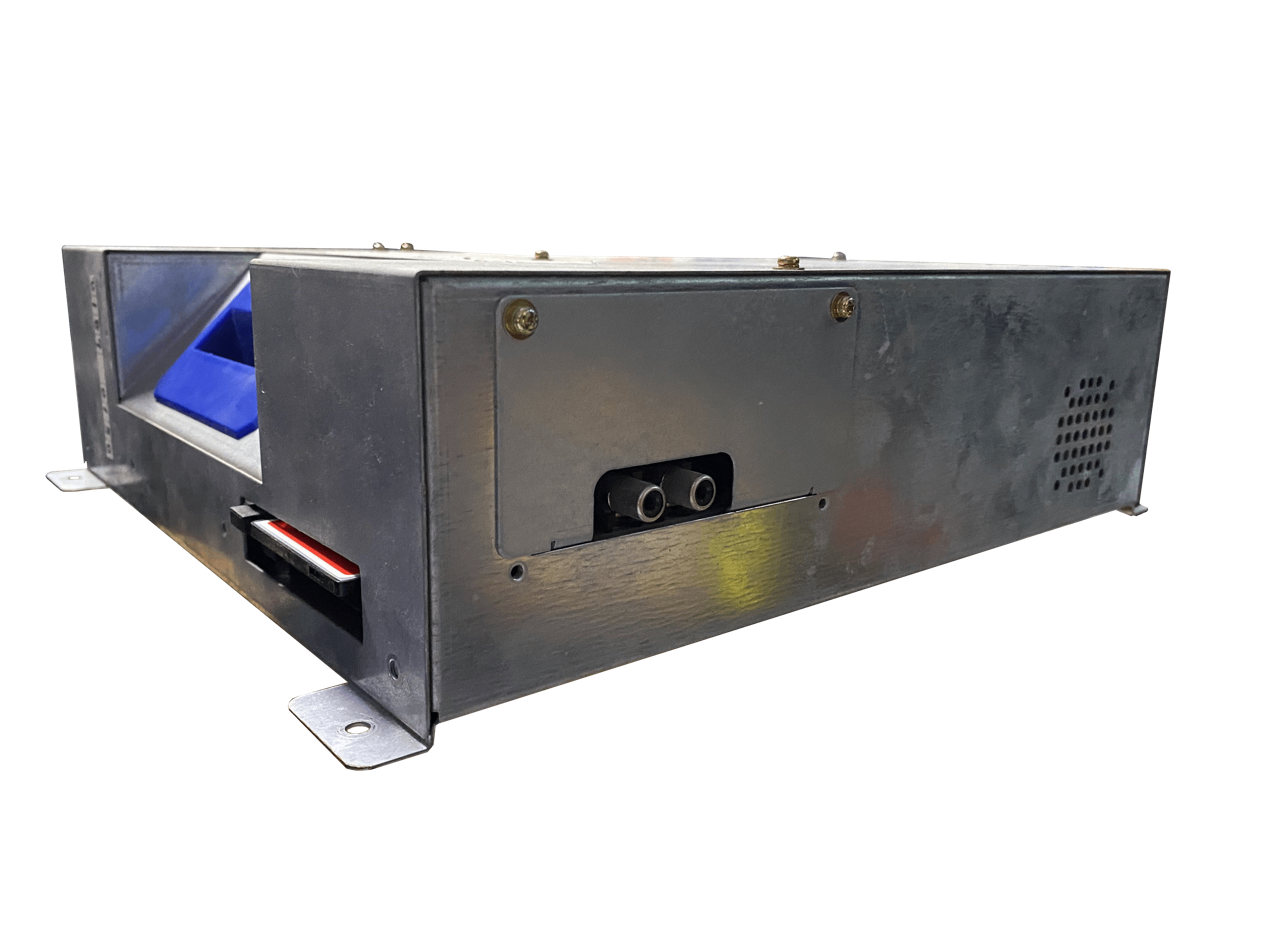
BEMANI System 573 in a silver case with ARCnet ports

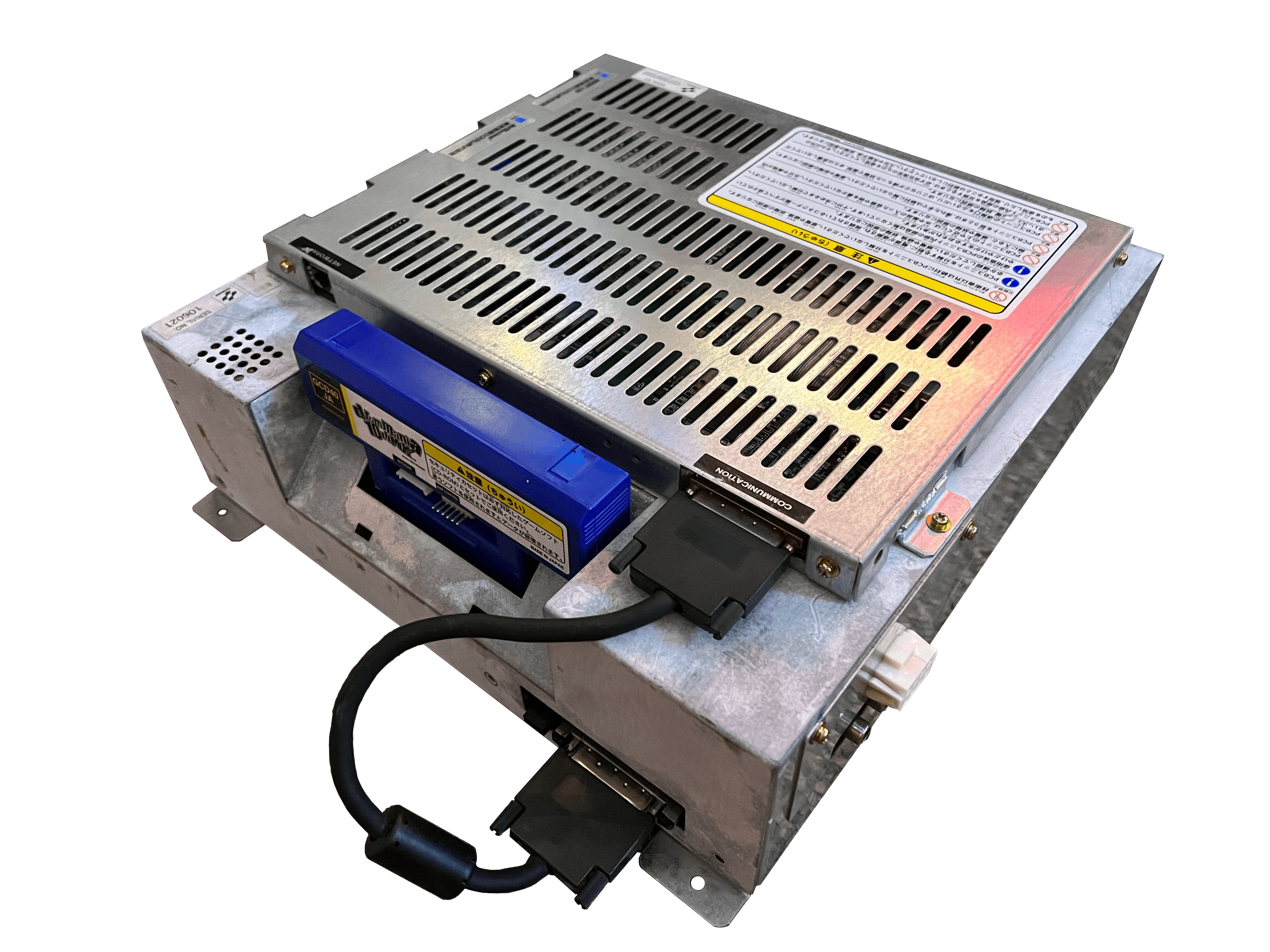
System 573 with e-Amusement network board

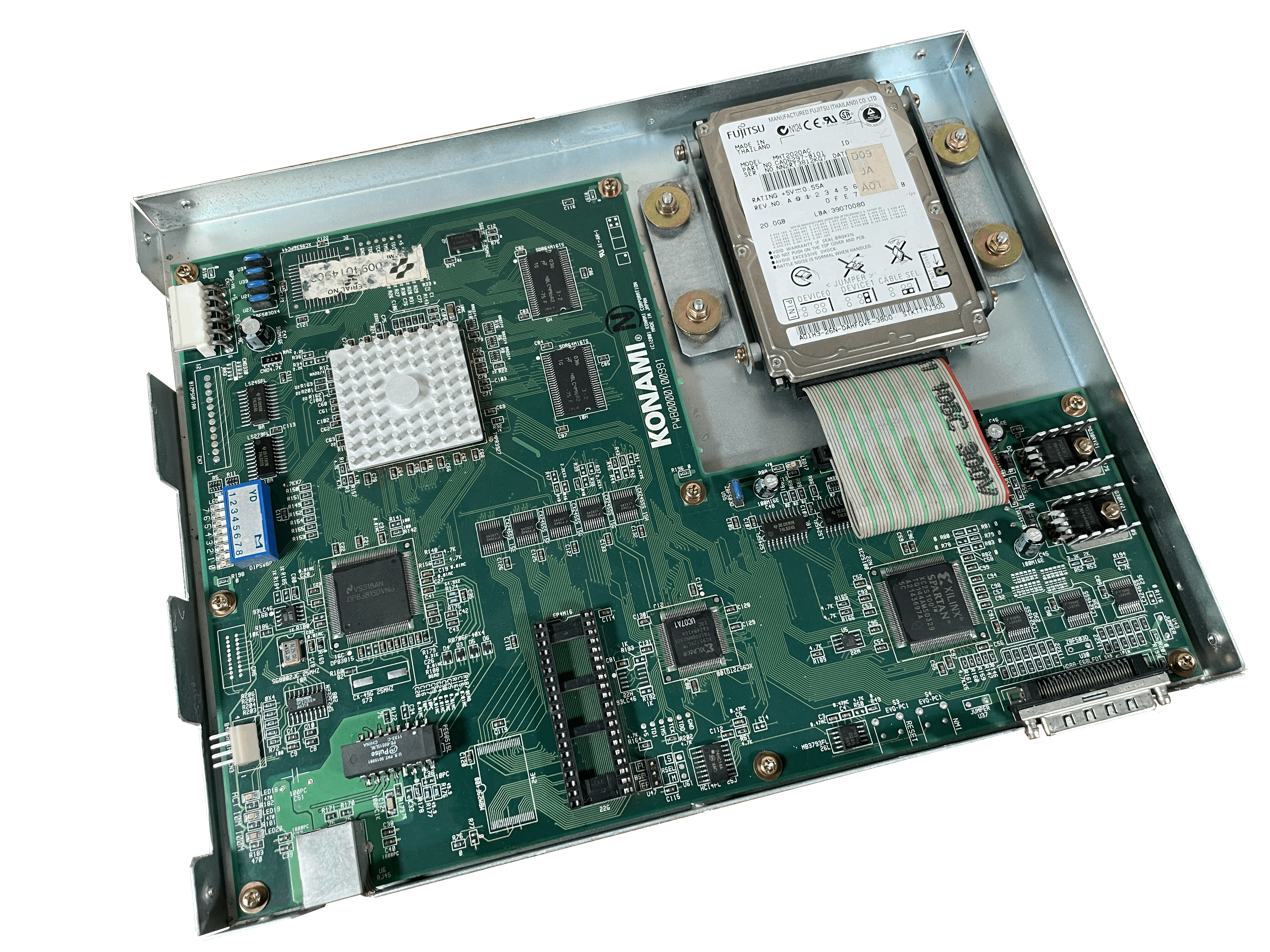
A System 573 e-Amusement network interface board

== List of System 573 games ==
=== System 573 ===
- Fighting Mania
- Fisherman's Bait
- Fisherman's Bait 2
- Fisherman's Bait 3
- Gun Mania
- Hyper Bishi Bashi
- Great Bishi Bashi Champ
- Jikkyō Powerful Pro Yakyū EX
- Konami 80's Arcade Gallery

=== Bemani System 573 Analog ===
- Dance Dance Revolution (Dancing Stage in Europe)
- Dance Dance Revolution 2ndMix and variants
- Dancing Stage featuring True Kiss Destination
- Dancing Stage featuring Dreams Come True
- DrumMania
- GuitarFreaks
- GuitarFreaks 2ndMix

=== Bemani System 573 Digital ===
- Dance Dance Revolution 3rdMix and variants
- Dance Dance Revolution 4thMix and variants
- Dance Dance Revolution 5thMix
- DDRMAX Dance Dance Revolution 6thMix
- DDRMAX2 Dance Dance Revolution 7thMix
- Dance Dance Revolution Extreme
- Dancing Stage Euromix
- Dancing Stage Euromix 2
- Dancing Stage featuring Dreams Come True
- Dance Maniax
- DrumMania 2ndMix through 10thMix
- GuitarFreaks 3rdMix through 11thMix
- Mambo a Go Go
- Martial Beat

=== System 573 Satellite Terminal ===
- Monster Gate
- Monster Gate 2
- Monster Gate 3
