= VBirds =

British animated girl group

- Origin: United Kingdom
- Genres: R&B; hip hop; dance; electronica
- Years active: 2002–2003
- Labels: Cartoon Network Music; EMI; Liberty Records; Mattel
- Past members: Wow; Boom; D:Lin; Bling

VBirds were a British virtual girl group, created in 2002 by a team of designers, producers and musicians. An animated television series of the same name, consisting of six one-minute episodes, aired on Cartoon Network between long-form programming. The band's only single, "Virtuality", was released on Liberty Records and reached No. 21 in the UK Singles Chart in early 2003. A spin-off series of dance tutorials, VBirds: Perfect, aired in 2003. Despite its success as a promotional tool to keep young viewers watching during ad breaks, no further singles were released. It was also seen in The Powerpuff Girls Movie VHS in the UK after "The Pirates are Out to Get You!" Advert by Federation Against Copyright Theft.

The band's backstory revolved around them being exiled from their home planet of Planet V by its ruler, King He:Lin, for refusing to participate in the dance farms on their planet. They were shrunk down in size and put into a dance machine which was launched from the planet down to Earth, so the humans could play with them as long as they wanted. The story concluded with He:Lin's echoing words "Enjoy yourselves while you can, VBirds. For you will never escape your dance machine prison!"

The VBirds were interviewed on SMTV Live. In the interview, Bling and Wow compare their music to that of fellow girl groups Destiny's Child, Mis-Teeq and the Sugababes.

== Development ==
The band was developed in early 2002, motivated by the success of Gorillaz, a successful British virtual band. Support was given from UB40 with animation for the characters designed by Ali Campbell and graphic arts student Dann Hanks and music coming from Birmingham-based Star Company, of UB40 drummer James Brown. Their debut single, Smoove, was set to be distributed at the Miami Winter Music Conference in Miami in March 2002. A website was being created and plans for a film were being outlined.

In January 2003, the band was signed by EMI and was reportedly valued at £1 million. The goal set by the label was to rival the global success of the Spice Girls and would follow a marketing campaign that would culminate that Christmas. With the failure of CD singles, EMI opted to release the single only on DVD and release a line of merchandising to go with it. On 14 April, VBirds: Perfect premiered on Cartoon Network. There was also the possibility of the show airing on either BBC One or ITV1 at a later date.

The band made its first concert in Birmingham on 20 April 2003 (Easter Sunday) with the unveiling of their first single at the Custard Factory in a special concert for schoolchildren. Virtuality released on 21 April. On the week of its release, the band made a second concert in Edinburgh, which included a dance competition at the Big W store on Milton Road. On 29 May, the band toured Liverpool to support Blazin' Squad. This pairing was repeated on 1 June when the band toured Belfast.

The music video to Virtuality was available from 27 February 2004 as part of an international agreement Cartoon Network had with the Vodafone live! portal.

== Members ==
- Boom is perhaps the most witty and energetic member of the group, although she can also be very bad tempered. Boom is able to create and throw pulsating balls of colour by blowing a kiss into her hand. This gives her a knack for decoration.
- Wow is the most mature VBird. Her powers calm those around her, allowing her to keep most arguments under control.
- Bling is the most fashionable of the girls and can easily show it by using her powers to create new costumes for the group in an instant. Although this ability comes in handy for the group during performances, she prefers to use it in her free time to annoy the other girls.
- D:Lin is the youngest in the group, and with green skin she stands out more than the other VBirds. D:Lin loves nothing more than DJing whenever the group is not performing, and she also uses records as throwing weapons whenever the situation calls for it.

== Single ==
"Virtuality"

Single by VBirds
- B-side: "Dance With Me"
- Released: 21 April 2003

"Virtuality" is the group's only single. It includes the B-side "Dance With Me", which samples the Woo! Yeah! portion of "Think (About It)" by Lyn Collins and vocals from "Virtuality". A music video for "Virtuality" was also released and included in select versions of the CD single.

UK CD
| No. | Title | Length |
|---|---|---|
| 1. | "Virtuality (Radio Edit)" | 3:40 |
| 2. | "Virtuality (Extended Video Edit)" |
| 3. | "Dance With Me" | 3:41 |
| 4. | "Virtuality (Slim Redz Planet V Mix)" | 3:43 |

== Legacy ==
"Virtuality" is featured in Dancing Stage Fever.
