= Dance Dance Revolution Extreme =

2002 video game

- Japanese PlayStation 2 version cover art
- Developers: Konami, Bemani
- Publisher: Konami
- Series: Dance Dance Revolution
- Platforms: Arcade, PlayStation 2
- Release: Arcade: JP: December 25, 2002; PlayStation 2: JP: October 9, 2003; NA: September 21, 2004
- Genres: Music, exercise
- Modes: Single-player, multiplayer
- Arcade system: Bemani System 573 Digital

Dance Dance Revolution Extreme is a music video game by Konami and is the eighth release in the main Dance Dance Revolution (DDR) series. It was released on December 25, 2002, for Japanese arcades, on October 9, 2003, for the Japanese PlayStation 2, and on September 21, 2004, for the North American PlayStation 2. This game is the ninth release in North America, but despite having the same name as its Japanese counterpart, its gameplay and soundtrack is significantly different and won the Video Music Awards in 2005 on MTV for Best Video Game Soundtrack.

While the PlayStation 2 version came out in North America, the arcade version was exclusive to Japan. Despite this, the arcade version was exported to many arcades worldwide, most of them being bootlegged. Dance Dance Revolution Extreme was the last game in the main DDR arcade franchise for almost four years, until the worldwide release of Dance Dance Revolution SuperNova (branded Dancing Stage SuperNova in Europe) in 2006. The arcade release of Extreme contains one of the largest soundtracks of any DDR game, featuring 240 songs, as well as music from other Bemani music titles. Konami issued an in-game thank you to the fans of Dance Dance Revolution and announced a rejuvenation of the entire series, but did not go into details. Konami's announcement led people to believe that DDR Extreme might be the final DDR release, or that the series might be on hiatus or rebooted in the same manner as Beatmania and Beatmania IIDX.

== Gameplay ==
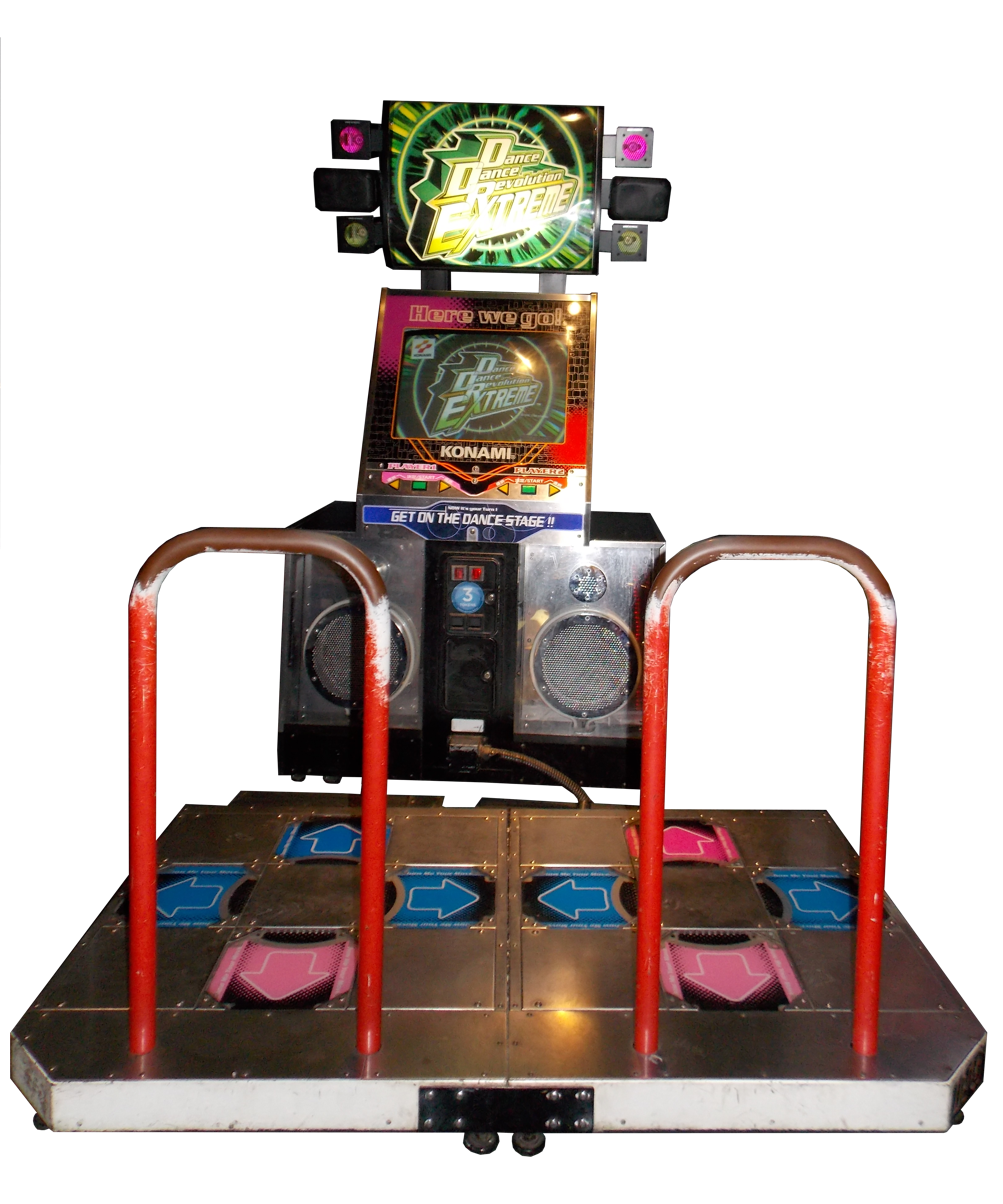
Dance Dance Revolution Extreme arcade cabinet

DDR Extreme is similar to DDRMAX2 7th mix. The game introduced "Beginner" and "Nonstop" modes, a mode similar to the previous "Challenge mode", but with an updated "life bar", a graded rating at the end of each course and a random banner. Perhaps the most noticeable changes in DDR Extreme are the extra stage and the updated green color scheme. Players can pick their own song to try to pass the extra stage, including "The Legend of Max". If they do well on the "Extra Stage", they can progress to One More Extra Stage. The banner of Dance Dance Revolution unlocks access to other songs. If the player passes, a special ending is unlocked. New songs are introduced, including the Bemani revival songs, like "Beatmania IIDX", "pop'n music" or "Keyboardmania", and versions of DDR Solo, Home DDR and DDR Club songs created by DDR Extreme. A "cheat code" reveals the true number of songs, including hidden songs. Pressing the left and right buttons simultaneously unlocks the Series, Alphabetical, Beats-per-minute, Player-best and Default sort orders.

The home version was released October 9, 2003. This was a follow-up to the DDR Party Collection which featured 58 characters. DDR Extreme included lesson mode and credits too. Also included were 4 new Bemani songs, 6 CS Extreme songs and a new song, Max. (period). Unlocked characters can play all nonstop modes, Nonstop orders can be turned into Oni orders and a 'diet' mode is available.

=== Courses ===
Nonstop mode uses the same gameplay and life found in regular modes, except that players must complete four consecutive songs without pausing. Also, players lose more of the dance gauge bar for each missed step as they progress further along each song.

Challenge mode, returning from DDRMAX2 Dance Dance Revolution 7thMix, is the most difficult game mode. In the arcade version, each player begins with four lives, and loses a life for breaking a combo (getting a judgment of "Good" or inferior) or letting go of a freeze arrow. Some songs replenish the life bar when completed, but if a player runs out of lives during a song, the game ends for that player. In the PlayStation 2 version, players are presented with specific goals to meet, such as passing a particular section of a song with different variations, playing a song with special modifiers, or earning a set score.

Nonstop and Challenge modes contain a new step judgment called Marvelous. The judgment uses a stricter timing window than Perfect, representing very accurate steps made by players. Marvelous is displayed after each such step in white, and is not displayed during normal gameplay. A fan project known as Dance Dance Revolution Extreme Pro enables the Marvelous judgment in all play modes.

=== Difficulty ===
DDR Extreme introduces two difficulty modes as mainstays in the series.

The first is Beginner mode, which appeared in Dance Dance Revolution USA and Dancing Stage EuroMix. It is easier than Light, only available in four-panel mode, and represented by a light-blue color. The background animations in Beginner mode are replaced with an on-screen dancer who follows the actual step patterns of the song, cueing the player when and where to step. Players are also given a brief tutorial on how to play Dance Dance Revolution after selecting their first stage. By default, "Beginner" mode automatically passes players on their first stage regardless of accuracy; subsequent stages play to end of the song even if failed. Players can exit or enter Beginner mode anytime during stage selection.

The "Challenge" difficulty level is above "Heavy", but the complexity of its step patterns are not necessarily always greater than "Heavy". Challenge mode cannot be selected at the start of the game; instead, players must enter during stage selection, represented by a purple color. Unlike other difficulty levels, relatively few songs have a Challenge difficulty level. In contrast, some songs contain only Challenge step patterns and selecting them automatically chooses the Challenge level for those songs. In the arcade release of DDR Extreme, no visual indicates that a song has Challenge step patterns. In the PlayStation 2 release, icons representing each difficulty level including Beginner and Challenge light up when a highlighted song is playable on those levels. During normal gameplay, Challenge uses the same rules as other levels.

=== Extra Stage ===
DDR Extreme uses a slightly different rule for Extra Stage, although the basic principle remains the same. Players who rate AA or better on Heavy/Challenge difficulty access the Extra Stage. However, the player can choose any song for Extra Stage, though the regular ES modifiers (1.5x (speed), Reverse (scroll), Heavy (difficulty), No Recovery dance meter) still used. The Legend of MAX will be added on ES. If the player gets AA on The Legend of MAX as ES, the player access One More Extra Stage (OMES), where Dance Dance Revolution is the sole choice (using 3x (speed), Reverse (scroll), Challenge (difficulty), and Sudden Death dance meter).

=== Extreme (2004) gameplay ===
Party Mode Dance Dance Revolution Extreme introduced Party Mode which contains a number of mini games, some of which require the EyeToy accessory to play.

Hyper Dash Hyper Dash does not require the EyeToy. The game uses the dance pad like the Power Pad and has players race each other down a city street avoiding obstacles and using power ups.

Feeding Time Feeding Time does not require the EyeToy. A type of food is assigned to each arrow and players must step on the one that best matches the animal being displayed on screen.

Watch Me Dance Watch Me Dance uses the EyeToy to place a live video of the player as the background during normal game play.

Clean the Screen Clean the Screen requires players to move their arms across the EyeToy's view to wipe away visual obstructions during normal game play.

Hands and Feet Hands and Feet add two hand targets to the arrow receptors at the top of the screen during normal game play. A special difficulty appears during song select that lets players play with their hands and feet at the same time.

Magical Ball Magical Ball does not require the dance pad. Players use their hands to knock a ball into a set of block in an effort to clear them all without losing the ball, similar to Arkanoid.

Coconut Panic Coconut Panic does not require the dance pad. Players shake palm trees with their movement and attempt to catch all the falling coconuts.

Song wheel In Dance Dance Revolution Extreme the song wheel introduced in Dance Dance Revolution 5thMix was altered and put in the center of the screen, song scrolling left and right instead of up and down. The banners are displayed at the top of screen with the Foot Ratings listed below in the center of the wheel. The Groove Radar has been removed and Nonstop and Challenge modes are selectable on the wheel instead of during difficulty select.

Workout Mode

== Music ==
The arcade release of Dance Dance Revolution Extreme features 80 new songs of 240 total. Among the new songs, three are from Dancing Stage EuroMix 2, and 11 are from both Club Version releases. The game received two regional releases for the PlayStation 2 (PS2), each with a different soundtrack. The Japanese release features a total of 111 songs, of which 68 are from the arcade release; "Senorita (Speedy Mix)" and Club Version songs are excluded. The North American release features a total of 71 songs, of which 41 are from the arcade version.

== Release ==
Dance Dance Revolution Extreme was developed by Konami Computer Entertainment Tokyo (KCET) and published in 2002 by Konami Digital Entertainment, Inc. (KDEI). Yoshihiko Ota served as executive producer of the arcade release, with Naoki Maeda serving as the lead sound director.

The official soundtrack was released on Toshiba EMI's Dancemania series of albums and contains two discs. The first disc contains a portion of the new music featured on the arcade and PlayStation 2 game along with the game's menu music and an uncut version of Graduation ~それぞれの明日^{?}~ performed by BeForU. The second disc is a nonstop megamix of the tracks from the first disc into a single uninterrupted performance. The megamix features the game's menu music and the in-game announcer, Londell "Taz" Hicks, mimicking the feel of playing the arcade game. Taz is also a vocalist for three songs featured in the soundtrack: "1998", "Dance Dance Revolution" and "Hyper Eurobeat".

=== Promotion ===
In the fall of 2006, Burger King in North America held a Dance Dance Revolution-themed promotion. Part of the promotion was a minigame on the Burger King website that if beaten provided an unlock code for the then two-year-old Dance Dance Revolution Extreme. Entering this code into the game unlocks the song "Memories". Prior to the release of this code DDR fan groups who had read the contents of the game disc and noticed the song believed its absence to be a last minute change or a glitch.

== Sequel ==
Dance Dance Revolution Extreme 2
- Developer: Konami
- Publisher: Konami
- Series: Dance Dance Revolution
- Platform: PlayStation 2
- Release: NA: September 27, 2005
- Genre: Music
- Modes: Single player, multiplayer

Dance Dance Revolution Extreme 2 is the tenth home version of Dance Dance Revolution to be released in North America. It was released by Konami on September 27, 2005, for the PlayStation 2 video game console. It was announced in a press release by Konami on May 17, 2005, and unveiled at the E3 expo in Los Angeles that same day.

The game includes 74 songs, 50 of which are unlocked through normal play or through points earned in Dance Master Mode. The majority of the songs are Konami originals composed by Naoki Maeda. Extreme 2 is the first PlayStation DDR game to include online multiplayer.

Dance Dance Revolution Extreme 2 features a total of 74 songs. All songs feature unique videos designed for this game, except for "Get Busy" by Sean Paul, which features a shorter version of its official music video. Many songs from Extreme 2 appear in subsequent Dance Dance Revolution releases, and their Extreme 2 videos are preserved in these releases. The song "Insertion (Machine Gun Kelly Mix)" is unrelated to the mainstream rapper Machine Gun Kelly. The official music video for Block Rockin' Beats appears in Dancing Stage Unleashed 3.

== Reception ==
Critical reception

Aggregate score
Aggregator	Score
Metacritic	77/100 (PS2)

Review score
Publication	Score
IGN	8.0

It received a runner-up position in GameSpot's 2004 "Best Puzzle/Rhythm Game" award category across all platforms, losing to Katamari Damacy.

== Legacy ==
Fans have modified the Dance Dance Revolution Extreme engine to implement features that were first introduced in subsequent games. DDR Extreme Pro enables the Marvelous timing window in all play modes, a feature that debuted in Dance Dance Revolution SuperNova 2. DDR Extreme Clarity improves upon Pro by adding Slow and Fast timing indicators, a feature only available at the operator's discretion beginning with Dance Dance Revolution X2, and only available with an e-Amusement membership since the 2014 release of DDR.

The lack of official releases outside of Japan led to bootlegged versions of Dance Dance Revolution Extreme. Most of these merely remove security checks compared to the original. Some have additional modifications, however:

- Dance Dance Revolution Megamix modifies game graphics.
- Dance Dance Revolution Extreme Plus modifies game graphics, including block-style graphics for regular arrows. It also adds a CPU speed modifier on Beginner, Light or Standard difficulties. If activated, this overclocks the System 573 CPU by 10% or 20%, which could cause damage to the CPU.
- Dance Dance Revolution Extreme Clean replaces several songs, which could be considered inappropriate, with "Healing Vision ~Angelic mix~".
- Dance Dance Revolution Extreme also saw bootleg cabinets, which use a PlayStation 2 home version of Extreme. These were recalled by Namco Cybertainment, as the game was of poorer quality than described.

To celebrate the 20th anniversary of Dance Dance Revolution, Dance Dance Revolution A received a DDR Selection mode, featuring songs from older mixes. Nine songs available in DDR Extreme, including two DDRMAX songs and three DDRMAX2 songs, can be played with the Extreme interface by using this mode. Dance Dance Revolution A20 also offers this mode.

Dance Dance Revolution A20 introduced the Legend License campaign on golden cabinets, adding a new cover version of a song from previous games as free downloadable content monthly. Of the five songs released to date, four are available in DDR Extreme:

- A Barbie Young cover of "Cartoon Heroes" by Aqua was exclusively featured in DDR Extreme. On April 25, 2019, DDR A20 introduced a remix of "Cartoon Heroes" by nc featuring Jasmine And Dario Toda.
- A Bus Stop cover of "Long Train Runnin' by The Doobie Brothers premiered in DDRMAX2 and returned in Extreme, while the SuperNova series and DDR X replaced it with a new cover by the artist X-Treme with different lyrics. On May 30, 2019, DDR A20 introduced a remix of "Long Train Runnin'" by Haruki Yamada (ATTIC INC.) with Bodhi Kenyon, which incorporates lyrics from both the Bus Stop and X-Treme covers.
- A DJ Miko cover of "Sky High" by Jigsaw premiered in DDR Solo 2000 and returned in Extreme. On June 27, 2019, DDR A20 will introduce a remix of "Sky High" by Haruki Yamada (ATTIC INC.) with Martin Leroux. This song is not to be confused with "Sky High" by Lucyfer, which exclusively appeared in DDR 4thMix Plus and DDR 5thMix.
- "Butterfly" by Smile.dk was featured in the first Dance Dance Revolution video game and returned in many subsequent releases, including Extreme. On July 25, 2019, DDR A20 introduced a remix of "Butterfly" by Sota F. from BEMANI Sound Team.

== See also ==
- DDR Festival Dance Dance Revolution (engine used for North American release)
- Dancing Stage Fusion (similar to Extreme's North American release)
