= Dance Dance Revolution 4thMix =

2000 video game

- Japanese Flyer for Dance Dance Revolution 4thMix
- Developer: Konami
- Publisher: Konami
- Series: Dance Dance Revolution
- Engine: n/a
- Platforms: Arcade, PlayStation, Microsoft Windows
- Release: Arcade: JP: August 24, 2000; JP: December 28, 2000; (4thMix Plus); PlayStation: JP: March 15, 2001; NA: April 30, 2002; (as DDR Konamix): EU: November 15, 2002; (as DS Party Edition); Microsoft Windows: NA: May 24, 2002
- Genres: Music, exercise
- Modes: Single player, multiplayer

Dance Dance Revolution 4thMix (Note: Dansu Dansu Reboryūshon Fōsu Mikkusu (ダンスダンスレボリューションフォースミックス)) is the fourth game in the main Dance Dance Revolution series of music video games. It was released as an arcade game by Konami on August 24, 2000, in Japan. 4thMix features 136 songs, of which 37 are new songs available and 12 are new unlockables that require an operator code. Dance Dance Revolution 4thMix Plus is an update that unlocks these 12 songs without an operator code, while also adding 14 new songs of its own, for a total of 150 songs.

== Gameplay ==
The core gameplay of 4thMix is the same as the previous Dance Dance Revolution games. For scoring, Each step is given a score based on the accuracy of the step and the running combo. A judgment of Great or Perfect will award points and increase the combo, whereas any lower judgment will break the combo, reducing it to zero. Jumps are only worth one judgment, and only adds one to the combo. Each Great is worth 555 points and each Perfect is worth 777 points. The player also receives 333 points multiplied by the current combo after every step. 4thMix is unusual in that it is the only game in the series where Boo steps do not deplete the dance gauge.

A player may play anywhere from one to five songs, depending on how many the arcade operator sets the machine to play each game. At the end of each song, the player sees their accumulated points, bonus points, and how many of each kind of step they stepped. They also get a letter grade that is dependent on the judgments received during play, ranging from "AA" (all steps Perfect) to D (failure, only seen in Versus mode when the other player passes). If the player manages to pass his or her songs, a cumulative results screen is given, totaling the stats from all played stages.

=== Nonstop ===
Nonstop Mode, a feature from Dance Dance Revolution 3rdMix, allows the player to play a course of several pre-determined songs without stopping.

=== Battle ===
Battle Mode replaced the Unison and Couple modes from previous mixes, and is chosen at the difficulty selection screen while on Versus mode. Battle steps must be played by both players, and are generally designed to make each player take turns between playing simple and complex patterns. As an added challenge, the steps rise from the middle of the screen, and drift to either player's side while continuing upwards.

=== Link data ===
Some machines have the ports to insert PlayStation memory cards. Such memory cards have to be PlayStation memory cards with Link Data from the home version of 4thMix or earlier. It can exchange data with 4thMix, as well as any earlier version that has songs that are in 4thMix. It can also use Edit Data, custom steps made on the home version.

=== Downloadable content ===
In the months after the release of the Windows version of Dance Dance Revolution, Konami offered free downloads for the game on the product website. The free downloads consisted of additional dancing character that were displayed during game play. The characters ranged from general styles (Club DJs, trendy outfits) to odd and seasonal styles (Bondage gear, Christmas dresses, Halloween costumes, robots). The download page displayed blank entries for up and coming downloads. The nature of the new dancers were revealed when the downloads were posted. Dancing characters were released as pairs (Usually a man and a woman when gender applied), however the final blank entry was a lone dancing character instead of a pair. The final character was a bonus character named Jason, that replaced Guy, a previous downloadable character.

== Variants ==
=== Konamix and Party Edition ===
Dance Dance Revolution Konamix and Dancing Stage Party Edition are international ports of 4thMix released in 2002 for the Sony PlayStation. Konamix was released in North America and consisted of 52 Konami original tracks, produced by the company's in-house music staff. Party Edition was released in Europe and included 46 of the Konami original tracks found on Konamix, plus five exclusive new licenses. It was also the last game in the series to be released for the PlayStation in North America.

=== Dance Dance Revolution (Windows) ===
Dance Dance Revolution was released for Microsoft Windows computers on May 24, 2002. The game used the engine and interface from 4thMix, and like Konamix, it only includes Konami original songs. However, the song count in the Windows version is reduced to 40 songs, of which 21 are unavailable in Konamix.

=== Dancing Stage Fever and Fusion ===
Dancing Stage Fever was released on October 24, 2003 for the PlayStation and PlayStation 2. Dancing Stage Fusion was released on November 5, 2004 for the same systems. The original PlayStation releases used a variant of the 4thMix engine, while also incorporating the announcer from DDR Solo 2000, though Solo Mode is absent. Fever also incorporates some menu music from 5thMix. These releases omit freeze arrows and include fewer songs than their PlayStation 2 counterparts.

== Music ==
Dance Dance Revolution 4thMix adds 49 new songs and removes one older song, for a total of 136 songs. Of these, 10 are unavailable in Asia.

=== 4thMix Plus music ===
Dance Dance Revolution 4thMix Plus adds 14 new songs and automatically unlocks the 12 locked songs in 4thMix, bringing the playlist to a total of 150 songs. Songs that are new to 4thMix Plus also return in the 5thMix soundtrack and arcade game, while the 4thMix locked songs are also automatically unlocked in 5thMix.

The 14 new songs include a cover of the theme from Enter the Dragon arranged by Naoki Maeda, and Ventura remixes of the Cat's Eye and Lupin the Third anime theme songs.

Of the 14 new songs, only four returned in the main Dance Dance Revolution arcade series after 5thMix. Two songs, which are remixes of "Rhythm and Police" and "Synchronized Love", returned exclusively in the Dance Dance Revolution Extreme arcade game in Japan and the DDRMAX PlayStation 2 game in North America. Two other songs, "Celebrate Nite" and "Sexy Planet", are Naoki Maeda compositions that premiered in Dancing Stage featuring True Kiss Destination and returned in DDR Solo 2000. 4thMix Plus introduced these songs to the main DDR series. With the exception of DDRMAX, these songs were subsequently kept in every main DDR release, including the current title, Dance Dance Revolution A20.

== Sequel ==
Dance Dance Revolution 5thMix (Note: Dansu Dansu Reboryūshon FifusuMikkusu (ダンスダンスレボリューションフィフスミックス)) is the fifth game in the Dance Dance Revolution series. It was released for Japanese arcades by Konami on March 27, 2001. 5thMix contains a total of 122 songs, of which 31 are new songs and 9 are new unlockables that require an operator code.

5thMix introduced the song wheel interface used when selecting songs. During gameplay, the resolution is now 240p at 60 fps, as opposed to the 30 fps rate used in previous releases.

All of the 18 new licenses in 5thMix, plus the two long versions of Konami originals, do not return in subsequent DDR arcade releases. "Never Ending Story" and "Test My Best", however, return in Dancing Stage EuroMix 2. Additionally, this does not include "Can't Stop Fallin' In Love" by Naoki, which was originally deemed to be a license, but was reclassified as a Konami original in DDRMAX2 and EuroMix 2.

The song "Be Together" was featured on a fictional Dance Dance Mania machine in the 2018 romantic comedy The Kissing Booth on Netflix. The film features a dance cover of the TM Network song, as does 5thMix, but it is covered by Sikora in the film instead of Ni-Ni.

== Reception ==
Aggregate review scores
Game	GameRankings	Metacritic
Konamix	85.66%	84/100

The PlayStation version of Dancing Stage Party Edition received a "Platinum" sales award from the Entertainment and Leisure Software Publishers Association (ELSPA), indicating sales of at least 300,000 copies in the United Kingdom.
