= DDRMAX Dance Dance Revolution 6thMix =

2001 video game

- Developers: Konami, Bemani
- Publisher: Konami
- Series: Dance Dance Revolution
- Platforms: Arcade, PlayStation 2
- Release: Arcade: JP: 2001; PlayStation 2: JP: May 16, 2002; NA: October 28, 2002
- Genres: Music, exercise
- Modes: Single-player, multiplayer
- Arcade system: Bemani System 573 Digital

DDRMAX Dance Dance Revolution 6thMix (Note: DDRMAXダンスダンスレボリューションシックスミックス (Dī Dī Ā Makkusu Dansu Dansu Reboryūshon ShikkusuMikkusu)) is the 6th game in the Dance Dance Revolution series of music video games. It was released in the arcades by Konami in 2001 and for the PlayStation 2 on May 16, 2002, in Japan. 6thMix contains a total of 42 songs, all which made their first arcade appearance on this release. 11 of these songs debuted in various console releases prior to 6thMix. All arcade songs from Dance Dance Revolution to Dance Dance Revolution 5thMix were removed in 6thMix, although many of the Konami originals from those games would later be revived in future arcade releases.

== Gameplay ==
The interface used is a recoloring and smoothing of the song wheel interface first introduced in Dance Dance Revolution 5thMix, with the addition of changeable sort settings and a longer time limit. Core gameplay remained mostly the same on 6thMix and 7thMix, with the addition of Freeze Arrows and a new scoring system:

Freeze Arrows appear as green arrows with a long extension. If they are held for the entire length successfully, a O.K. is scored. If it is not held down for the entire length, a N.G. (no good) is scored. Freezes affect the life bar. Scores are calculated with 2 distinct scoring systems, the long-score system used to determine rankings, and an independent dance point system (known on later games as EX SCORE) now used to determine the grade.

All songs have a long-score ceiling of 50 million points, and a bonus score is tacked onto it based on the difficulty of the song and other factors. Rankings are given for the highest long-score accumulations a round. If a player plays more than three songs, then it only counts the last three played. If a song is played repeatedly among the three songs used for ranking, then the repeated songs carry no bonus score.

The dance-point system uses raw step values to determine the grade. A 'perfect' step adds two points, a 'great' step adds one point, a 'good' step is worth nothing, a 'boo' step takes away four points, and a 'miss' step takes away eight points. An 'O.K.' freeze adds six points, and an 'N.G.' freeze is worth nothing. The dance points are also tied to the life bar. As always, if a player takes too many bad steps and depletes the life bar, they will fail, and the game will end immediately. If the first song is in Light mode, then the game will allow a player to fail that song and continue, but will fail the player out if they fail a second song. In two-player games, if one player fails, they can continue dancing, but it ceases to accumulate dance points for the failed player, accumulates score points at only 10 points per step, and automatically gives the failed player an 'E' for the song.

The grade is dependent on the number of dance points accumulated: 100% dance points is 'AAA', at least 93% is 'AA', at least 80% is 'A', at least 65% is 'B', at least 45% is 'C' and anything below 45% is a 'D'. If a net dance-point total of zero is obtained without depleting the life bar and, thus, failing, an 'E' is awarded. The final grade for the entire game is an average of the grades from the last three songs and not derived from the actual dance points scored.

This 2-tiered scoring system is still utilized on DDRMax2, though the long-score system is reformed. For the long-score system in DDRMax2, it now has a maximum for each song of 10,000,000 multiplied by the foot rating for the routine. Maximum scores can range from 10 million to 100 million for individual songs. Bonus scores are abolished, though the new long-score system tends to be weighted so that errors early in a routine are not as costly as errors late. The dance point system, which determines grade, remains unchanged. This scoring system would be kept for Dance Dance Revolution Extreme.

6thMix was intended to be the Next Generation of Dance Dance Revolution. As such, there are many changes. First, the difficulty levels were renamed. 'Basic' was renamed 'Light', 'Trick' was named 'Standard', and 'Maniac' was named 'Heavy'. They are also given Japanese difficulty names in conjunction: 楽 (raku), 踊 (you), and 激 (geki), respectively. Their color codes—orange, fuchsia and green, respectively—remain the same. Also, all songs from previous versions have been removed in 6thMix (although the prototype version of this game had some songs from previous DDR versions), intending the game to start from scratch. Many past songs do return on 7thMix and later releases, however.

=== Interface and graphics ===
Dancing characters have been removed in 6thMix, 7thMix and Extreme. Instead, the arrows scroll over clips of full motion video, hence the game does not render any polygons. The screen refreshes at a full speed of 60 frames per second. In addition, the arrows themselves have been tweaked too, now having a rounded edge on their outer tip rather than the V-shaped cut used in all previous games.

These games retain the Song Wheel interface introduced in 5thMix, but add an easier method to enter modifiers. In previous versions, modifiers like "Sudden" or "Shuffle" required a combination of dance steps. Beginning in 6thMix, a player only needs to hold the Start button when they select a song to bring up a full menu of available modifiers, including the ability to speed up or slow down the scrolling of arrows, and a final chance to select the song difficulty they wish to play.

=== Modifiers ===
A new options menu accessed by holding down the Start button when selecting a song debuted on 6thMix, and is retained on future mixes.

Some of the available modifiers include Speed mods, which change the arrow speed. Boost, which causes the arrows to accelerate as they near the step zone, Appearance, which changes the appearance of the arrows. Turn mods modify the stepchart itself, Other affects the difficulty of the steps, Scroll changes the scroll direction of the arrows, and Freeze Arrows can also be turned off.

=== Extra Stage ===
New to 6thMix is the "Extra Stage", where players are rewarded for meeting conditions set by the game. If a AA is scored on the final stage on Heavy mode, a message inviting the player to "Try Extra Stage" is shown instead of the Cleared graphic. For the Extra Stage, the song wheel is locked on "MAX 300", and the song is played with several forced modifiers, including 1.5x speed and Reverse. The song is also played in Pressure mode, where the dance gauge starts filled, and can only go down.

If the player scores a AA or higher on the Extra Stage the game again rewards them with "One More Extra Stage". This time, the song wheel is locked to "CANDY☆", an easier song but with more difficult Modifiers. The exact same modifiers are used, but the song is played in Sudden Death mode, where any step judgment which breaks a combo immediately ends the game. If the player clears the song with a full combo (which is the only way to do so in Sudden Death mode), a special credits movie is shown. When this second Boss Song is passed for the first time it too will be unlocked for normal play, also displayed on the Song Wheel in red.

=== Link data ===
Some machines have the ports to insert PlayStation memory cards. Such memory cards have to be original PlayStation (not PS2) memory cards with Link Data from the home version of DDR 5thMix (the home version of 6thMix cannot create arcade-compatible Link Data). 5thMix can create two different kinds of arcade link data; the Link Data file for 6thMix is known as "New Version" Link Data and is forward-compatible with 7thMix arcade machines as well. Link Data serves two primary purposes: Score-saving and Internet Ranking. The user can save his or her scores from arcade performances, and whenever the game is played in the future, the arcade game will load the scores for each user and show them on the song-selection screen to show the player's best performances. These scores can also be viewed at home with 5thMix. 6thMix also provides Internet Ranking codes based on the user's performance in a given set of songs. As with all of Konami's Internet Ranking events, the website for the game would allow users to enter in a generated password which contains their initials and scores for that session, and the website would display the rankings for those who have submitted codes. Link Data saves these passwords so that they may be entered much more conveniently.

The arcade game can exchange custom stepchart data with 6thMix, as well as any earlier version that has songs that are in 6thMix, though this requires special steps to be taken in 6thMix to write a PlayStation-formatted save file, which must then be copied to the PlayStation memory card by the user.

== Release ==
=== Home versions ===
The home version of DDRMAX Dance Dance Revolution 6thMix was released in Japan on May 16, 2002, for the Sony PlayStation 2 video game console. It featured all 42 songs from the arcade version as well as two additional console-exclusive songs "Kind Lady" and "So In Love". 6thMix's hidden songs can be unlocked automatically, without additional play, by accessing its save data on home versions of DDRMAX2 Dance Dance Revolution 7thMix or Dance Dance Revolution Extreme.

DDRMAX Dance Dance Revolution, with the mix number omitted, is the home version released in North America for the PlayStation 2 video game console. The North American version is considerably different from the Japanese version. It displays song difficulties using the traditional foot-rating system and the Groove Radar in tandem.

== Sequel ==
DDRMAX2 Dance Dance Revolution 7thMix
- Developer: Konami
- Publisher: Konami
- Series: Dance Dance Revolution; Bemani
- Engine: 7thMix, 7thMix PlayStation
- Platforms: Arcade, PlayStation 2
- Release: Arcade: JP: March 27, 2002; PlayStation 2: JP: April 24, 2003; NA: September 23, 2003
- Genres: Music, Exercise
- Modes: Single-player, Multiplayer
- Arcade system: Bemani System 573 Digital

DDRMAX2 Dance Dance Revolution 7thMix (Note: Dī Dī Ā Makkusu Tsū Dansu Dansu Reboryūshon SebunsuMikkusu (DDRMAX2ダンスダンスレボリューションセブンスミックス)) is the seventh game in the Dance Dance Revolution series of music video games. It was released in Japanese arcades by Konami on March 27, 2002, though bootleg installations are available internationally. The Japanese release of DDRMAX2 contains a total of 135 songs, with 53 of these making their first arcade appearance on this release. This game was rated 8.5/10 stars by IGN.

Dancing Stage EuroMix 2 is an arcade variant of DDRMAX2 for the European market. It has fewer features and a reduced soundtrack of 68 songs. Dancing Stage MegaMix was released exclusively for the PlayStation 2 in Europe and Australia, and this game also uses the DDRMAX2 engine.

DDRMAX2 Dance Dance Revolution is a game for the PlayStation 2 in North America.

== Music ==
DDRMAX includes 42 songs in the arcade release, and 44 songs in the Japanese PlayStation 2 release. DDRMAX2 includes 135 songs in the arcade release, and 74 songs in the Japanese PlayStation 2 release.

DDRMAX Dance Dance Revolution 6thMix Japanese soundtrack
Song	Artist	Note
Licensed songs (25 total)
"Lovin' You (Rob Searle Club Mix)"	Vinyl Baby	from The Best of World Trance FantasiA
"Somewhere Over the Rainbow"	Cosmic Gate	from The Best of World Trance FantasiA
"Highs Off U (Scorccio XY Mix)"	4 Reeel	from Dancemania Summers 2001
"www.blonde girl (Momo Mix)"	Jenny Rom	from Dancemania Speed Best 2001
"Ordinary World"	Aurora featuring Naimee Coleman	from The Best of World Trance Fantasia
"Bye Bye Baby Balloon" 🔷	Joga	from Dancemania 20
"COW GIRL"	Bambee	from Dancemania Happy Paradise 2
"Ghosts (Vincent de Moor Remix)" 🔷	Tenth Planet	from The Best of World Trance Fantasia
"Miracle"	St. Jannaro	from Dancemania Summers 2001
"Witch Doctor (Giants Toons Version)"	Cartoons	from Cartoons Toontastic!
"Do You Remember Me"	Jenny	from Dancemania Happy Paradise 2
"Telephone Operator (Club MIX)" 💚	Shelley Peter	from Dancemania Summers 2001
"Justify My Love"	Tess	from Dancemania X8
"The Centre Of The Heart (Stonebridge Clubmix)"	Roxette	from the album Room Service
"夜空ノムコウ" (Yozora no Mukōu)	Eurobeat Lovers	from Dancemania Happy Paradise 2
"I'm In the Mood for Dancing"	Sharon	from Dancemania Happy Paradise 2
"Nori Nori Nori"	Judy Crystal	from Dancemania Happy Paradise 2
"Let's Groove"	Tips & Tricks vs. Wisdome	from Dancemania Summers 2001
"Twilight Zone (R-C Extended Club MIX)"	2 Unlimited	from Dancemania X9
"そばかす Freckles (KCP Re-Edit)" (Sobakasu Freckles (KCP Re-Edit))	Tiggy	from Dancemania Happy Paradise 2
"Flash in the Night" 🔷	Flashman	from Dancemania Happy Paradise 2
"My Sweet Darlin'"	Wildside	from Dancemania Happy Paradise 2
"So Deep (Perfect Sphere Remix)"	Silvertear	from The Best of World Trance Fantasia
"Follow Me" 🔷	Lady Baby	from Dancemania Happy Paradise 2
"Fantasy"	Melissa	from Dancemania Happy Paradise 2
Konami Original songs (3 total)
"true... (radio edit)"	小坂りゆ	New Konami Original
"Firefly"	BeForU	New Konami Original
"exotic ethnic"	Reveng	New Konami Original
Console songs (11 total)
"On the Jazz"	Jonny Dynamite!	from Dance Dance Revolution 5thMix (JP PS)
"DIVE (more deep & deeper style)"	BeForU	from Dance Dance Revolution 5thMix (JP PS)
"Groove"	Sho-T feat. Brenda	from Dance Dance Revolution 4thMix (JP PS)
"Do It Right"	Sota feat. Ebony Fay	from Dance Dance Revolution 5thMix (JP PS)
"Share My Love"	Julie Frost	from Dance Dance Revolution 4thMix (JP PS)
"Look To The Sky"	System S.F. feat. Anna	from Dance Dance Revolution 5thMix (JP PS)
"Let the beat hit 'em! (Classic R&B Style)"	Stone Bros.	from Dance Dance Revolution Extra Mix
"Midnite Blaze"	U1 Jewel Style	from Dance Dance Revolution 4thMix (JP PS)
"Healing Vision (Angelic mix)"	2MB	from Dance Dance Revolution 5thMix (JP PS)
"Groove 2001"	Sho-T feat. Brenda	from Dance Dance Revolution Extra Mix
"Orion.78 (civilization mix)"	2MB	from Dance Dance Revolution 4thMix (JP PS)
Boss songs (2 total)
"CANDY☆" 🔒	Luv Unlimited	New Konami Original; One More Extra Stage
"MAX 300" 🔒	Ω	New Konami Original; Extra Stage
Hidden song (1 total)
"true... (Trance Sunrise Mix)" 🔒	小坂りゆ	New Konami Original
PlayStation 2 exclusives (2 total)
"Kind Lady" 🔒	Okuyatos	New Konami Original
"So In Love" 🔒	Caramel.S	New Konami Original

DDRMAX2 Dance Dance Revolution 7thMix Japanese soundtrack
Song	Artist	Note
Licensed songs (19 total)
"A Minute (Extended Mix)" 🔶	X-Treme	from Dancemania 20
"Drifting Away"	Lange feat. Skye	from The Best of World Trance Fantasia 2
"Fantasy"	Lockout	from Dancemania 21
"It's Raining Men (Almighty Mix)" 🔶	Geri Halliwell	from Dancemania 20
"Long Train Runnin'"	Bus Stop	from Dancemania 21
"Look at Us (Daddy DJ Remix)"	Sarina Paris	from ZIPmania 02
"Maximum Overdrive (KC Club Mix)"	2 Unlimited	from Dancemania 21
"Nothing Gonna Stop (Dance Mania Mix)"	Micky	from Dancemania 21
"Stay"	Tess	from Dancemania 21
"The Reflex"	Duran Duran	from Dancemania 80's TWO
"Trance de Janeiro (Samba de Janeiro 2002 Epic Vocal Remix)"	Bellini	from Dancemania Super Trance Best
"Baby Love Me"	Judy Crystal	
"Little Boy (Boy on Boy Mix)" †	Captain Jack	from Captain's Best
"Living in America"	Rose & John	from Dancemania SPEED 8
"More Than I Needed to Know" 🔶	Scooth ‡	from Dancemania X7
"So Fabulous So Fierce (Freak Out)"	Thunderpuss feat. Jocelyn Enriquez	from Dancemania 20
"The Whistle Song (Blow My Whistle Bitch)"	DJ Aligator Project	from Dancemania Super Trance Best
"There You'll Be" 🔶	DJ Speedo feat. Angelica	from Dancemania Speed 8
"Waka Laka"	Jenny Rom vs Zippers	from Dancemania Speed 8
Konami Original songs (10 total)
"Destiny"	Naoki feat. Paula Terry	New Konami Original
"ever snow"	Yoma Komatsu	New Konami Original
"rain of sorrow"	NM feat. Ebony Fay	New Konami Original
"Secret Rendez-vous"	Divas	New Konami Original
"Candy♥"	小坂りゆ	New Konami Original
"D2R"	Naoki	New Konami Original
"Dive to the Night"	小坂りゆ	New Konami Original
"Sweet Sweet ♥ Magic"	jun	New Konami Original
"Tsugaru"	Reveng vs De-Sire	New Konami Original
"Bre∀k Down!"	BeForU	New Konami Original
Hidden songs (3 total)
"Burning Heat! (3 Option Mix)"	Mr.T with Motoaki. F	from beatmania IIDX 7th Style remix of theme song from Gradius
"Spin the disc"	good-cool	from beatmania IIDX 5th Style
"i feel ..."	Akira Yamaoka	from beatmania IIDX 7th Style
Challenge remixes (19 total)
These songs are listed in the Nonstop Challenge section.
Boss songs (2 total)
"革命" (Kakumei)	DJ Taka with Naoki	New Konami Original; One More Extra Stage
"Maxx Unlimited"	Z	New Konami Original; Extra Stage
Revived songs (45 total)
"Absolute"	DJ Taka	from Dance Dance Revolution 5thMix
"Abyss"	DJ Taka	from Dance Dance Revolution 5thMix
"Broken My Heart"	Naoki feat. Paula Terry	from Dance Dance Revolution 5thMix
"Can't Stop Fallin' In Love (Speed Mix)"	Naoki	from Dance Dance Revolution 5thMix
"DXY!"	TaQ	from Dance Dance Revolution 5thMix
"Ecstasy"	d-complex	from Dance Dance Revolution 5thMix
"Healing Vision"	De-Sire	from Dance Dance Revolution 5thMix
"Insertion"	Naoki underground	from Dance Dance Revolution 5thMix
"祭 Japan" (Matsuri Japan)	Re-Venge	from Dance Dance Revolution 5thMix
"サナ・モレッテ・ネ・エンテ" (Sana Mollete Ne Ente)	Togo Project feat. Sana	from Dance Dance Revolution 5thMix
"Still in My Heart"	Naoki	from Dance Dance Revolution 5thMix
"Celebrate Nite"	N.M.R.	from Dance Dance Revolution 4thMix Plus
"Sexy Planet"	Crystal Aliens	from Dance Dance Revolution 4thMix Plus
".59"	DJ Taka	from Dance Dance Revolution 4thMix
"B4U"	Naoki	from Dance Dance Revolution 4thMix
"Burnin' the Floor"	Naoki	from Dance Dance Revolution 4thMix
"Can't Stop Fallin' in Love"	Naoki	from Dance Dance Revolution 4thMix
"Drop Out"	NW260	from Dance Dance Revolution 4thMix
"era (nostalmix)"	TaQ	from Dance Dance Revolution 4thMix
"Higher"	NM feat. Sunny	from Dance Dance Revolution 4thMix
"Holic"	TaQ	from Dance Dance Revolution 4thMix
"Hysteria"	Naoki 190	from Dance Dance Revolution 4thMix
"Love Again Tonight (For Melissa Mix)"	Naoki feat. Paula Terry	from Dance Dance Revolution 4thMix
"My Summer Love"	Mitsu-O! with Geila	from Dance Dance Revolution 4thMix
"Orion.78 (AMeuro-MIX)"	Re-Veng	from Dance Dance Revolution 4thMix
"Paranoia Evolution"	200	from Dance Dance Revolution 4thMix
"Super Star"	DJ Rich feat. Tailbros.	from Dance Dance Revolution 4thMix
"Trip Machine Climax"	De-Sire	from Dance Dance Revolution 4thMix
"Wild Rush"	Factor-X	from Dance Dance Revolution 4thMix
"Drop the Bomb"	Scotty D.	from Dance Dance Revolution 3rdMix Plus
"Trip Machine ~luv mix~"	2MB	from Dance Dance Revolution 3rdMix Plus
"Afronova"	Re-Venge	from Dance Dance Revolution 3rdMix
"Dead End"	N&S	from Dance Dance Revolution 3rdMix
"Dynamite Rave"	Naoki	from Dance Dance Revolution 3rdMix
"End of the Century"	No. 9	from Dance Dance Revolution 3rdMix
"La Senorita"	Captain.T	from Dance Dance Revolution 3rdMix
"Luv To Me (AMD Mix)"	DJ Kazu feat. Tiger Yamato	from Dance Dance Revolution 3rdMix
"Paranoia Rebirth"	190'	from Dance Dance Revolution 3rdMix
"Silent Hill"	Thomas Howard	from Dance Dance Revolution 3rdMix
"AM-3P"	KTz	from Dance Dance Revolution 2ndMix
"Brilliant 2U"	Naoki	from Dance Dance Revolution 2ndMix
"Brilliant 2U (Orchestra-Groove)"	Naoki	from Dance Dance Revolution 2ndMix
"Paranoia Kcet (clean mix)"	2MB	from Dance Dance Revolution 2ndMix
"Paranoia Max ~Dirty Mix~"	190	from Dance Dance Revolution 2ndMix
"Paranoia"	180	from Dance Dance Revolution

DDRMAX2 Japanese PlayStation 2 additions
Song	Artist	Note
Previous Dance Dance Revolution songs (7 total)
"B4U"	Naoki	from Dance Dance Revolution 4thMix
"Dead End"	N&S	from Dance Dance Revolution 3rdMix
"Drop Out"	NW260	from Dance Dance Revolution 4thMix
"Dynamite Rave"	Naoki	from Dance Dance Revolution 3rdMix
"Kind Lady"	Okuyatos	from DDRMAX (JP PS2)
"Paranoia Rebirth"	190'	from Dance Dance Revolution 3rdMix
"So In Love"	Caramel.S	from DDRMAX (JP PS2)
Dance Dance Revolution Console songs (8 total)
"AM-3P (303 Bass Mix)"	KTz (remixed by U1)	from Dance Dance Revolution Konamix
"Crash!"	Mr. Brain & The Final Band	from Dancing Stage EuroMix 2 Preview song from Dance Dance Revolution Extreme
"Cutie Chaser (Morning Mix)"	Club Spice	from Oha Suta Dance Dance Revolution; Preview song from Dance Dance Revolution Extreme
"Do It Right (Harmonized 2Step Mix)"	Sota feat. Ebony Fay	from DDRMAX Dance Dance Revolution
"Drop the Bomb -System S.F. Mix-"	Scotty D.	from DDRMAX Dance Dance Revolution
"Dynamite Rave -Down Bird Sota Mix-"	Naoki	from DDRMAX Dance Dance Revolution
"Look To The Sky (True Color Mix)"	System S.F. feat. Anna	from DDRMAX Dance Dance Revolution
"Love♥Shine"	小坂りゆ	Preview song from Dance Dance Revolution Extreme
New Console songs (9 total)
"Do It Right (80's Electro Mix)"	Sota feat. Ebony Fay	New Konami Original
"I'm For Real"	Slake	fromm beatmania IIDX 4th style from DDRMAX Dance Dance Revolution
Jam & Marmalade	Final Offset	from beatmania III from DDRMAX Dance Dance Revolution
"Kind Lady (interlude)"	Okuyatos	New Konami Original
"Logical Dash"	DJ Taka	from beatmania 4thMIX -the beat goes on- from DDRMAX Dance Dance Revolution
"Look To The Sky (Trance Mix)"	System S.F. feat. Anna	New Konami Original
"Overblast!!"	L.E.D. Light	from beatmania APPEND 5thMIX -Time to get down- from DDRMAX Dance Dance Revolution
"Peace-Out"	DJ Nagureo	from beatmania 4thMIX -the beat goes on- from DDRMAX Dance Dance Revolution
"The Shining Polaris"	L.E.D. feat.Sana	from beatmania IIDX 4th style -new songs collection- from DDRMAX Dance Dance Revolution
Boss songs (3 total)
"革命" (Kakumei)	DJ Taka with Naoki	from DDRMAX2 Dance Dance Revolution 7thMix; One More Extra Stage
"Max Unlimited"	Z	from DDRMAX2 Dance Dance Revolution 7thMix; Extra Stage
"PARANOIA survivor"	270	Preview song from Dance Dance Revolution Extreme

Notes:

- † This song's title contains an in-game typo. The correct name is "Little Boy (Boy Oh Boy Mix)".
- ‡ This song's artist name contains an in-game typo. The correct artist is Scooch.
- 🔷 This song is exclusive to DDRMAX in arcades.
- 🔶 This song is unavailable in the PlayStation 2 version.
- 💚 This song is exclusive to DDRMAX and DDR Extreme in arcades.

The North American version of DDRMAX is exclusive to the PlayStation 2. It features a total of 71 songs, with 13 Konami originals (including both Boss songs and both console exclusives) and one license ("Ordinary World" by Aurora featuring Naimee Coleman) shared in common with the Japanese version. The remaining songs consist of 50 Konami originals from various sources, 5 console exclusive licenses, and 2 licenses from prior arcade releases. The North American version also features a Nonstop mode, with 6 courses consisting of 5 to 21 songs each.

=== Nonstop Challenge ===
Nonstop Challenge was introduced in the arcade version of DDRMAX2, which features 18 courses with songs in the Standard, Heavy and Challenge difficulties. In this arcade release, the Challenge difficulty is exclusive to the Nonstop Challenge mode, and there are 19 songs which solely feature a Challenge difficulty. All 19 songs involve Naoki Maeda, and have their titles hidden in-game, displaying their original counterpart's banner and background instead.

Beginning with Dancing Stage EuroMix 2, the songs "B4U (B4 ZA Beat Mix)" and "Hysteria 2001" can be played individually, with the Challenge steps available in Expert mode, as well as introducing their proper graphics. This is also the sole arcade release to offer three easier difficulties for each song, although Double mode omits the easiest of these, which is Beginner. From Dance Dance Revolution Extreme to Dance Dance Revolution SuperNova 2, all 19 songs can be played individually, with only Challenge steps available. 17 of the 19 songs remain in subsequent releases.

Eight of the 18 Nonstop Challenge courses from DDRMAX2 return in Dance Dance Revolution Extreme, with the Marvelous judgment enabled, and with "Kakumei" featuring Dark and Reverse modifiers on Demon Road 2.

Subsequent arcade games have also introduced special Challenge charts or songs:

- Dance Dance Revolution SuperNova 2 features six Groove Rader Special charts.
- Dance Dance Revolution X features 17 X-Special charts.
- Dance Dance Revolution X2 features 7 Chinese Challenge songs.

Nonstop Challenge exclusive songs
Song	Artist	BPM	Courses	Difficulty		Notes
Song	Artist	BPM	Courses	Single	Double	Notes
"Higher (Next Morning Mix)"	NM feat. Sunny	132	Pop 8 Nearly = 130	7	7	
"Afronova (from Nonstop Megamix)"	Re-Venge	200	Love Reveng	8	8	🎬
"AM-3P (AM East Mix)"	kTz	140	Midnight Blue	7	7	
"B4U (B4 ZA Beat Mix)"	Naoki	170	Naoki Platinum	7	7	†
"Brilliant 2U (K.O.G G3 Mix)"	Naoki	170	Naoki Platinum	7	7	† 🎬
"Burnin' The Floor (Blue Fire mix)"	Naoki	155	Naoki Platinum	7	7	🎬
"Celebrate Nite (Euro Trance Style)"	N.M.R	144	Naoki Platinum	8	8	
"Drop Out (from Nonstop Megamix)"	NW260	130	Demon Road 2	9	9	†
"Dynamite Rave (B4 ZA Beat Mix)"	Naoki	170	Naoki Platinum; Happy Hardcore	7	8	‡ 🎬
"Ecstasy (midnight blue mix)"	d-compleX	145	Midnight Blue	8	8	
"Hysteria 2001"	NM	190	From Solo; Soul 6	7	7	
"Matsuri Japan (fron Nonstop Megamix)"	Re-Venge	190	Fine Choice; Love Reveng	7	7	§
"My Summer Love (Tommy's Smile Mix)"	Mistu-O! with Geila	100	Fine Choice	7	7	
"Silent Hill (3rd christmas mix)"	Thomas Howard	125	Pop 8	7	7	
"Sexy Planet (from Nonstop Megamix)"	Crystal Aliens	180	Midnight Blue; Demon Road 2	7	7	† 🎬
"Still in My Heart (Momo Mix)"	Naoki	85-170	Demon Road 2 Naoki feat. Paula Terry	8	8	†
"Super Star (from Nonstop Megamix)"	D.J.Rich feat. Tailbros.	128	From Solo	7	7	†
"Tsugaru (Apple Mix)"	RevenG vs. De-Sire	165	Love RevenG; Demon Road 2	9	8	
"Wild Rush (from Nonstop Megamix)"	Factor-X	125	From Solo	7	8	†

DDRMAX2 Dance Dance Revolution 7thMix arcade courses
Course	Song title	Difficulty		Unlock level
Course	Song title	Single	Double	Unlock level
Nearly = 130
Nearly = 130	1. "Long Train Runnin'"	5	5	—N/a
Nearly = 130	2. "So Fabulous So Fierce (Freak Out)"	5	5	—N/a
Nearly = 130	3. "Look At Us (Daddy DJ Remix)"	6	6	—N/a
Nearly = 130	4. "Higher (next morning mix)"	7	7	—N/a
Nearly = 130	5. "A MINUTE (Extended Mix)"	4	5	—N/a
Tempo Changer				—N/a
Tempo Changer	1. "Era (Nostalmix)"	8	8	1st Pass
Tempo Changer	2. "Insertion"	9	8	1st Pass
Tempo Changer	3. "Somewhere Over the Rainbow"	7	7	1st Pass
Tempo Changer	4. "Let's Groove"	6	7	1st Pass
Tempo Changer	5. "More Than I Needed to Know"	7	7	1st Pass
Cool 7
Cool 7	1. "Justify My Love"	5	4	2nd Pass
Cool 7	2. "Look To The Sky"	5	5	2nd Pass
Cool 7	3. "Groove 2001"	6	6	2nd Pass
Cool 7	4. "Holic"	8	8	2nd Pass
Cool 7	5. "On The Jazz"	7	7	2nd Pass
Cool 7	6. "Rain of Sorrow"	9	8	2nd Pass
Cool 7	7. "Drifting Away"	8	8	2nd Pass
BeForU				2nd Pass
BeForU	1. "True... (Trance Sunrise Mix)"	5	6	2nd Pass
BeForU	2. "Dive to the Night"	5	6	2nd Pass
BeForU	3. "Firefly"	5	5	2nd Pass
BeForU	4. "Ever Snow"	8	8	2nd Pass
BeForU	5. "Bre∀k Down!"	9	9	2nd Pass
BeForU	6. "Candy♥"	7	7	2nd Pass
POP 8
POP 8	1. "More Than I Needed to Know"	5	5	3rd Pass
POP 8	2. "Silent Hill (3rd Christmas Mix)"	7	7	3rd Pass
POP 8	3. "Candy☆"	5	6	3rd Pass
POP 8	4. "Baby Love Me"	5	5	3rd Pass
POP 8	5. "Higher (next morning mix)"	7	7	3rd Pass
POP 8	6. "そばかす Freckles (KCP Re-Edit)"	7	8	3rd Pass
POP 8	7. "Do You Remember Me?"	8	9	3rd Pass
POP 8	8. "My Sweet Darlin'"	8	8	3rd Pass
Fine Choice
Fine Choice	1. "Nori Nori Nori"	5	5	4th Pass
Fine Choice	2. "My Summer Love (Tommy's Smile Mix)"	7	7	4th Pass
Fine Choice	3. "Matsuri Japan (From Nonstop Megamix)"	7	8	4th Pass
Fine Choice	4. "Witch Doctor (Giant Toons Version)"	4	6	4th Pass
Fine Choice	5. "The Whistle Song (Blow My Whistle Baby)"	7	7	4th Pass
Happy Hardcore				4th Pass
Happy Hardcore	1. "WWW.Blonde Girl (Momo Mix))"	7	7	4th Pass
Happy Hardcore	2. "Still in My Heart (Momo Mix)"	8	8	4th Pass
Happy Hardcore	3. "Dynamite Rave (B4 Za Beat Mix)"	7	8	4th Pass
Happy Hardcore	4. "Waka Laka"	8	8	4th Pass
Happy Hardcore	5. "Sweet Sweet ♥ Magic"	9	9	4th Pass
Love RevenG
Love RevenG	1. "Matsuri Japan (From Nonstop Megamix)"	7	8	5th Pass Also in SuperNova
Love RevenG	2. "Afronova (From Nonstop Megamix)"	8	8	5th Pass Also in SuperNova
Love RevenG	3. "Tsugaru (Apple Mix)"	9	8	5th Pass Also in SuperNova
Love RevenG	4. "Orion.78 (AMeuro-MIX)"	9	7	5th Pass Also in SuperNova
Love RevenG	5. "Exotic Ethnic"	9	9	5th Pass Also in SuperNova
From Solo
From Solo	1. "Let the beat hit 'em! (Classic R&B Style)"	6	6	5th Pass
From Solo	2. "Super Star (From Nonstop Megamix)"	7	7	5th Pass
From Solo	3. "Wild Rush (From Nonstop Megamix)"	8	8	5th Pass
From Solo	4. "Hysteria 2001"	7	7	5th Pass
From Solo	1. "Can't Stop Fallin' in Love"	8	8	5th Pass
鬼道 (Demon Road)
鬼道 (Demon Road)	1. "Drop Out"	9	9	6th Pass (Final)
鬼道 (Demon Road)	2. "D2R"	7	7	6th Pass (Final)
鬼道 (Demon Road)	3. "Waka Lake"	8	8	6th Pass (Final)
鬼道 (Demon Road)	4. "Paranoia"	8	9	6th Pass (Final)
鬼道 (Demon Road)	5. "Trance de Janeiro"	8	9	6th Pass (Final)
鬼道 (Demon Road)	6. "Paranoia Kcet ~Clean Mix~"	9	9	6th Pass (Final)
鬼道 (Demon Road)	7. "Stay"	9	9	6th Pass (Final)
鬼道 (Demon Road)	8. "Healing Vision ~Angelic Mix~"	9	9	6th Pass (Final)
鬼道 (Demon Road)	9. "Tsugaru"	9	9	6th Pass (Final)
鬼道 (Demon Road)	10. "Maxx Unlimited"	10	10	6th Pass (Final)
This table excludes the 8 courses that return in Dance Dance Revolution Extreme.

DDRMAX2 Dance Dance Revolution 7thMix Japanese PlayStation 2 courses

Name	Song title (Single/Double)
More Light
More Light	1. "Absolute" (4/4)
More Light	2. "I'm For Real" (3/3)
More Light	3. "Ever Snow" (2/2)
More Light	4. "Overblast!!" (5/5)
More Light	5. "Destiny" (5/6)
BeForU
BeForU	1. "Love♥Shine" (4/4)
BeForU	2. "Dive to the Night" (5/6)
BeForU	3. "Ever Snow" (5/6)
BeForU	4. "Bre∀k Down!" (6/6)
BeForU	5. "Candy♥" (5/5)
Nearly = 130
Nearly = 130	1. "Long Train Runnin'" (5/5)
Nearly = 130	2. "So Fabulous So Fierce (Freak Out)" (5/5)
Nearly = 130	3. "Look At Us (Daddy DJ Remix)" (6/6)
Nearly = 130	4. "Higher (Next Morning Mix)" (7/7)
Nearly = 130	5. "Spin the disc" (5/5)
From IIDX
From IIDX	1. "Jam & Marmalade" (5/5)
From IIDX	2. "Spin the Disc" (5/5)
From IIDX	3. "I'm For Real" (7/6)
From IIDX	4. "The Shining Polaris" (7/7)
From IIDX	5. "I Feel..." (6/5)
From IIDX	6. "Burning Heat! (3 Option Mix)" (9/9)
Love Song Collection
Love Song Collection	1. "Baby Love Me" (5/5)
Love Song Collection	2. "So in Love" (7/7)
Love Song Collection	3. "Silent Hill (3rd Christmas Mix)" (7/7)
Love Song Collection	4. "Dive to the Night" (7/7)
Love Song Collection	5. "My Summer Love (Tommy's Smile Mix)" (7/7)
DJ Sota
DJ Sota	1. "Look To The Sky (True Color Mix)" (6/5)
DJ Sota	2. "Kind Lady (interlude)" (8/8)
DJ Sota	3. "Dynamite Rave -Down Bird Sota Mix-" (5/5)
DJ Sota	4. "Do It Right (80's Electro Mix)" (8/8)
DJ Sota	5. "Drop the Bomb - System S.F. MIX" (7/6)
DJ Sota	6. "Do It Right (Harmonized 2Step Mix)" (7/7)
DJ Sota	7. "Look To The Sky (Trance Mix)" (8/8)
Middle tempo
Middle tempo	1. "Living in America" (5/6)
Middle tempo	2. "Nothing Gonna Stop (Dance Mania Mix)" (5/5)
Middle tempo	3. "Look At Us (Daddy DJ Remix)" (6/6)
Middle tempo	4. "Higher (Next Morning Mix)" (7/7)
Middle tempo	5. "Fantasy" (5/5)
Middle tempo	6. "Drifting Away" (8/8)
Rap Mania
Rap Mania	1. "Long Train Runnin'" (5/5)
Rap Mania	2. "Little Boy (Boy on Boy Mix)" (6/6)
Rap Mania	3. "Super Star (From Nonstop Megamix)" (7/7)
Rap Mania	4. "Hysteria 2001" (7/7)
Rap Mania	5. "D2R" (5/5)
Rap Mania	6. "Burnin' the Floor (Blue Fire Mix)" (7/7)
Rap Mania	7. "B4U (B4 Za Beat Mix)" (7/7)
Midnight Blue
Midnight Blue	1. "AM-3P (AM East mix)" (7/7)
Midnight Blue	2. "Ecstasy (Midnight Blue Mix)" (8/8)
Midnight Blue	3. "Sexy Planet (From Nonstop Megamix)" (7/7)
Midnight Blue	4. "Secret Rendez-vous" (7/7)
Midnight Blue	5. "AM-3P (303 Bass Mix)" (7/7)
BPM140
BPM140	1. "Fantasy" (2/2)
BPM140	2. "The Whistle Song (Blow My Whistle Bitch)" (4/4)
BPM140	3. "Maximum Overdrive (KC Club Mix)" (4/5)
BPM140	4. "AM-3P (AM East mix)" (7/7)
BPM140	5. "Stay" (9/9)
BPM140	6. "I Feel..." (9/9)
BPM140	7. "Rain of Sorrow" (9/8)
Tricky
Tricky	1. "Secret Rendez-vous" (5/5)
Tricky	2. "Logical Dash" (6/5)
Tricky	3. "Wild Rush (From Nonstop Megamix)" (7/8)
Tricky	4. "Ecstasy (midnight blue mix)" (8/8)
Tricky	5. "Hysteria 2001" (7/7)
Tricky	6. "Tsugaru (Apple Mix)" (9/8)
Tricky	7. "Maxx Unlimited" (10/10)
Random
Random	1. ??? (?/?)
Random	2. ??? (?/?)
Random	3. ??? (?/?)
Random	4. ??? (?/?)
Random	5. ??? (?/?)
Random	6. ??? (?/?)
Naoki Platinum
Naoki Platinum	1. "Brilliant 2U (K.O.G G3 Mix)" (7/7)
Naoki Platinum	2. "Dynamite Rave (B4 Za Beat Mix)" (7/8)
Naoki Platinum	3. "Celebrate Nite (Euro Trance Style)" (8/8)
Naoki Platinum	4. "B4U (B4 Za Beat Mix)" (7/7)
Naoki Platinum	5. "Burnin' the Floor (Blue Fire Mix)" (7/7)
Naoki Platinum	6. "D2R" (7/7)
乙女★道 (Otome★Dou)
乙女★道 (Otome★Dou)	1. "Nothing Gonna Stop (Dance Mania Mix)" (7/7)
乙女★道 (Otome★Dou)	2. "Destiny" (7/8)
乙女★道 (Otome★Dou)	3. "Dive to the Night" (7/7)
乙女★道 (Otome★Dou)	4. "Living in America" (7/8)
乙女★道 (Otome★Dou)	5. "Candy♥" (7/7)
乙女★道 (Otome★Dou)	6. "Baby Love Me" (8/8)
乙女★道 (Otome★Dou)	7. "Look At Us (Daddy DJ Remix)" (7/7)
乙女★道 (Otome★Dou)	8. "Waka Laka" (8/8)
乙女★道 (Otome★Dou)	9. "Bre∀k Down!" (9/9)
乙女★道 (Otome★Dou)	10. "Stay" (9/9)
乙女★道 (Otome★Dou)	11. "ever snow" (8/8)
乙女★道 (Otome★Dou)	12. "Love♥Shin" (7/8)
Up and Down
Up and Down	1. "Candy♥" (3/3)
Up and Down	2. "So Fabulous So Fierce (Freak Out)" (7/7)
Up and Down	3. "Bre∀k Down!" (6/6)
Up and Down	4. "So In Love" (7/7)
Up and Down	5. "Dynamite rave (B4 Za Beat Mix)" (7/8)
Up and Down	6. "My Summer Love (Tommy's Smile Mix)" (7/7)
Up and Down	7. "Drop Out (From Nonstop Megamix)" (9/9)
鬼道 (Oni Dou)
鬼道 (Oni Dou)	1. "D2R" (7/7)
鬼道 (Oni Dou)	2. "Waka Laka" (8/8)
鬼道 (Oni Dou)	3. "Trance de Janeiro (Samba de Janeiro 2002 Epic Vocal Remix)" (8/9)
鬼道 (Oni Dou)	4. "Stay" (9/9)
鬼道 (Oni Dou)	5. "Tsugaru" (9/9)
鬼道 (Oni Dou)	6. "Maxx Limited" (10/10)
鬼道 弐 (Oni Dou Ni)
鬼道 弐 (Oni Dou Ni)	1. "Drop Out (From Nonstop Megamix)" (9/9)
鬼道 弐 (Oni Dou Ni)	2. "Sexy Planet (From Nonstop Megami)" (7/7)
鬼道 弐 (Oni Dou Ni)	3. "Bre∀k Down!" (9/9)
鬼道 弐 (Oni Dou Ni)	4. "Tsugaru (Apple Mix)" (9/8)
鬼道 弐 (Oni Dou Ni)	5. "Burning Heat! (3 Option Mix)" (9/9)
鬼道 弐 (Oni Dou Ni)	6. "革命" (9/9)
ULTRA12
ULTRA12	1. "Brilliant 2U (K.O.G G3 MIX)" (7/7)
ULTRA12	2. "Sweet Sweet ♥ Magic" (9/9)
ULTRA12	3. "Sexy Planet (From Nonstop Megamix)" (7/7)
ULTRA12	4. "Afronova (From Nonstop Megamix)" (8/8)
ULTRA12	5. "Still in My Heart (Momo Mix)" (8/8)
ULTRA12	6. "Hysteria 2001" (7/7)
ULTRA12	7. "Tsugaru" (9/9)
ULTRA12	8. "革命" (9/9)
ULTRA12	9. "祭 Japan (From Nonstop Megamix)" (7/8)
ULTRA12	10. "Drop Out (From Nonstop Megamix)" (9/9)
ULTRA12	11. "Maxx Unlimited" (10/10)
ULTRA12	12. "Paranoia Survivor" (10/10)

DDRMAX2 Dance Dance Revolution North American PlayStation 2 courses

Name	Song title	Normal (Single/Double)	Difficult (Single/Double)
Light Naoki
Light Naoki	1. "Still in My Heart"	(4/4)	(6/5)
Light Naoki	2. "Can't Stop Fallin' in Love"	(3/3)	(5/4)
Light Naoki	3. "D2R"	(3/3)	(5/5)
Hit Station
Hit Station	1. "Heaven"	(4/3)	(6/6)
Hit Station	2. "Busy Child"	(5/3)	(7/6)
Hit Station	3. "Will I?"	(6/5)	(7/7)
Feel Emotion
Feel Emotion	1. "Days Go By"	(4/2)	(5/5)
Feel Emotion	2. "Take Me Away (into the night) (radio vocal)"	(4/2)	(6/5)
Feel Emotion	3. "Love At First Sight"	(4/2)	(5/4)
In Motion
In Motion	1. "Conga Feeling"	(3/4)	(5/7)
In Motion	2. "In the Navy '99 (XXL Disaster Remix"	(4/4)	(6/5)
In Motion	3. "Dream a Dream"	(6/6)	(7/7)
In Motion	4. "The Whistle Song (Blow My Whistle Baby)"	(4/4)	(7/7)
Say Yeah!
Say Yeah!	1. "Ghosts (Vincent de Moor Remix)"	(3/3)	(6/5)
Say Yeah!	2. "Long Train Runnin'"	(2/3)	(5/5)
Say Yeah!	3. "Drifting Away"	(5/5)	(8/8)
Say Yeah!	4. "Twilight Zone (R-C Extended Club Mix)"	(5/5)	(9/8)
Globetrotting
Globetrotting	1. "Conga Feeling"	(3/4)	(5/7)
Globetrotting	2. "Afronova"	(5/6)	(7/7)
Globetrotting	3. "Bre∀k Down!"	(4/4)	(6/6)
Globetrotting	4. "Tsugaru"	(6/7)	(9/9)
Globetrotting	5. "More Deep (ver.2.1)"	(5/5)	(6/6)
RMX of LOVE
RMX of LOVE	1. "Do It Right"	(5/5)	(7/8)
RMX of LOVE	2. "Silent Hill"	(6/5)	(7/7)
RMX of LOVE	3. "Kind Lady"	(6/5)	(7/8)
RMX of LOVE	4. "Do It Right (80's Electro Mix)"	(7/7)	(7/7)
RMX of LOVE	5. "Silent Hill (3rd christmas mix)"	(7/7)	(7/7)
RMX of LOVE	6. "Kind Lady (interlude)"	(8/8)	(8/8)
DJ Battle
DJ Battle	1. "The Whistle Song (Blow My Whistle Baby)"	(4/4)	(7/7)
DJ Battle	2. "Heaven"	(6/6)	(7/7)
DJ Battle	3. "Super Star (From Nonstop Megamix)"	(7/7)	(7/7)
DJ Battle	4. "Bad Routine"	(5/6)	(6/7)
DJ Battle	5. "Tomorrow Perfume"	(5/4)	(7/6)
DJ Battle	6. "Keep On Liftin'"	(5/5)	(5/6)
RMX of TRUTH
RMX of TRUTH	1. "AM-3P"	(6/6)	(8/7)
RMX of TRUTH	2. "AM-3P (AM East mix)"	(7/7)	(7/7)
RMX of TRUTH	3. "Celebrate Nite"	(6/6)	(7/7)
RMX of TRUTH	4. "Celebrate Nite (Euro Trance Style)"	(8/8)	(8/8)
RMX of TRUTH	5. "Hysteria"	(6/5)	(8/7)
RMX of TRUTH	6. "Hysteria 2001"	(7/7)	(7/7)
RMX of TRUTH	7. "Super Star"	(6/6)	(8/8)
RMX of TRUTH	8. "Super Star (From Nonstop Megamix)"	(7/7)	(7/7)
Mega Dance Hits
Mega Dance Hits	1. "Heaven"	(6/6)	(7/7)
Mega Dance Hits	2. "Days Go By"	(5/5)	(6/6)
Mega Dance Hits	3. "Love At First Sight"	(5/4)	(7/6)
Mega Dance Hits	4. "Twilight Zone (R-C Extended Club MIX)"	(5/5)	(9/8)
Mega Dance Hits	5. "Take Me Away (into the night) (radio vocal)"	(6/5)	(7/7)
Mega Dance Hits	6. "Drifting Away"	(5/5)	(8/8)
Mega Dance Hits	7. "Ghosts (Vincent de Moor Remix)"	(6/5)	(8/8)
Mega Dance Hits	8. "Will I?"	(6/5)	(7/7)
Boogie Down
Boogie Down	1. "Groove"	(6/6)	(8/8)
Boogie Down	2. "Get Down Tonight"	(5/5)	(6/6)
Boogie Down	3. "Let's Groove"	(2/3)	(5/4)
Boogie Down	4. "Do It Right"	(4/4)	(5/5)
Boogie Down	5. "Kind Lady"	(6/5)	(7/8)
Boogie Down	6. "Spin the disc"	(2/2)	(5/5)
Boogie Down	7. "Long Train Runnin'"	(5/5)	(7/7)
Boogie Down	8. "In the Navy '99 (XXL Disaster Remix)"	(6/5)	(8/8)
Rap Mania
Rap Mania	1. "Long Tran Runnin'"	(2/3)	(5/5)
Rap Mania	2. "D2R"	(3/3)	(5/5)
Rap Mania	3. "Super Star (From Nonstop Megamix)"	(7/7)	(7/7)
Rap Mania	4. "Keep On Liftin'"	(5/5)	(5/6)
Rap Mania	5. "Try 2 Luv. U"	(4/6)	(5/7)
Rap Mania	6. "Hysteria 2001"	(7/7)	(7/7)
Rap Mania	7. "Think Ya Better D"	(3/3)	(4/4)
Rap Mania	8. "End of the Century"	(4/5)	(7/6)
Rap Mania	9. "Dream a Dream"	(6/6)	(7/7)
Trancendence
Trancendence	1. "I Feel..."	(3/2)	(6/5)
Trancendence	2. "Tomorrow Perfume"	(5/4)	(7/6)
Trancendence	3. "The Shining Polaris"	(5/5)	(7/7)
Trancendence	4. "Will I?"	(6/5)	(7/7)
Trancendence	5. "Heaven"	(6/6)	(7/7)
Trancendence	6. "Ghosts (Vincent de Moor Remix)"	(3/3)	(6/5)
Trancendence	7. "Drifting Away"	(2/2)	(5/5)
Trancendence	8. "Take Me Away (into the night) (radio vocal)"	(6/5)	(7/7)
Trancendence	9. "So Deep (Perfect Sphere Remix)"	(3/2)	(5/6)
Trancendence	10. "Lovin' You (Rob Searle Club Mix)"	(2/3)	(6/5)
House Nights
House Nights	1. "Let's Groove"	(2/3)	(5/4)
House Nights	2. "Spin the disc"	(2/2)	(5/5)
House Nights	3. "Kind Lady (interlude)"	(8/8)	(8/8)
House Nights	4. "Think Ya Better D"	(4/4)	(5/7)
House Nights	5. "Don't Stop! (AMD 2nd Mix)"	(4/3)	(5/4)
House Nights	6. "Bad Routine"	(5/6)	(6/7)
House Nights	7. "AM-3P"	(5/5)	(6/6)
House Nights	8. "I Was The One"	(3/3)	(5/5)
House Nights	9. "Days Go By"	(5/5)	(6/6)
Ultimate 12
Ultimate 12	1. "Radical Faith"	(6/6)	(8/8)
Ultimate 12	2. "Vanity Angel"	(6/5)	(8/8)
Ultimate 12	3. "SP-Trip Machine (Jungle Mix)"	(7/8)	(8/8)
Ultimate 12	4. "Tsugaru"	(6/7)	(9/9)
Ultimate 12	5. "Afronova"	(7/7)	(9/9)
Ultimate 12	6. "Paranoia Kcet (clean mix)"	(7/7)	(9/9)
Ultimate 12	7. "Kakumei"	(8/8)	(9/9)
Ultimate 12	8. "Hysteria"	(6/5)	(8/7)
Ultimate 12	9. "I Feel..."	(6/5)	(9/9)
Ultimate 12	10. "Burning Heat! (3 Option Mix)"	(5/6)	(9/9)
Ultimate 12	11. "Xenon"	(6/6)	(9/9)
Ultimate 12	12. "Maxx Unlimited"	(8/8)	(10/10)

Notes for Nonstop Challenge:

- † This song is unavailable in the European release of Dance Dance Revolution World.
- ‡ "Dynamite Rave (B4 ZA Beat Mix)" made its final appearance in Dance Dance Revolution X in Asia, Dance Dance Revolution SuperNova 2 in North America, and Dancing Stage SuperNova in Europe
- § "Matsuri Japan (fron Nonstop Megamix)" made its final appearance in Dance Dance Revolution SuperNova 2 outside of Europe, and Dancing Stage SuperNova in Europe.
- 🎬 This song includes a music video in Dance Dance Revolution Extreme 2, Dance Dance Revolution SuperNova, and subsequent arcade releases.

== Reception ==
DDRMAX Dance Dance Revolution reception

Aggregate score
Aggregator	Score
Metacritic	85%

Review scores
Publication	Score
GameSpot	7 / 10
IGN	9.3 / 10

DDRMAX2 Dance Dance Revolution reception

Aggregate scores
Aggregator	Score
GameRankings	82.35%
Metacritic	82/100

Review scores
Publication	Score
Electronic Gaming Monthly	7.67/10
GameSpot	7.2/10
GameSpy	4.5/5
IGN	8.5/10
Official U.S. PlayStation Magazine	4/5

The PlayStation 2 release of DDRMAX Dance Dance Revolution received favourable reviews. GameSpot gave it a 7 out of 10 rating. IGN gave it a 9.3 out of 10. Its sequel, DDRMAX2 Dance Dance Revolution, also received "generally positive" reviews according to video game review aggregator website Metacritic.

By July 2006, the PlayStation 2 version of DDRMAX2 Dance Dance Revolution 7thMix had sold 750,000 copies and earned $28 million in the United States. Next Generation ranked it as the 84th highest-selling game launched for the PlayStation 2, Xbox or GameCube between January 2000 and July 2006 in that country. Combined sales of Dance Dance Revolution released between those dates reached 5 million units in the United States by July 2006.

== References and notes ==
Notes
