= List of Claymore episodes =

The cover of the second limited edition DVD collection released by Avex Trax.

The Claymore anime series is based on the manga series of the same name by Norihiro Yagi. The episodes are directed by Hiroyuki Tanaka and produced by Madhouse Studios. They adapt the first through eleventh volumes of the manga over 24 episodes. The remaining 2 episodes follow an original storyline not found in the manga written by Yagi. The series aired between April 2007 and September 2007 in Japan on Nippon Television. The series follows the adventures of Clare, a Claymore, or half-human, half-yoma hybrid, and her comrades as they fight for survival in a world filled with yoma, or shapeshifting demons.

Two pieces of theme music are used for the episodes: one opening theme and one ending theme. The opening theme is "Raison d'être" (レゾンデートル; lit. Reason for being) by Nightmare. The ending theme is J-pop singer Riyu Kosaka's single, "Danzai no Hana~Guilty Sky" (断罪の花 ~Guilty Sky~; lit. Flower of Conviction~Guilty Sky). A single for "Danzai no Hana~Guilty Sky" was released on May 30, 2007, and the single for "Raison d'être" was released on June 6, 2007.

9 DVD volumes, each containing 3 episodes of the anime, have been released in Japan by Avex Trax. In addition, 5 limited-edition sets have been released. The first limited-edition set contains the first DVD volume, while the other 4 sets each contain 2 DVD volumes. The latest limited-edition set and volumes were released on March 26, 2008. On February 15, 2008, Funimation announced that it has acquired the Region 1 DVD and broadcast licenses for the anime, and it released all series in 6 volumes in North America between fall 2008 and summer 2009.

== Episodes ==
No.	Title	Directed by	Written by	Original release date
1	"Great Sword"; Transliteration: "Taiken -KUREIMOA-" (Japanese: 大剣 -クレイモア-)	Hiroyuki Tanaka	Yasuko Kobayashi	April 4, 2007
A young boy, Raki's whole family was killed by a Yoma (demon), so a Claymore (half-demon, half-human hybrid) is hired to kill the Yoma. Raki interacts with the Claymore when she arrives. Raki later goes to his uncle's house and is met by the Yoma, who had taken the form of his brother, but is subsequently saved by the Claymore. After the attack, Raki is banished from the village by the frightened villagers and left to die in the deserts before he is saved by a Claymore, and subsequently attacked by another Yoma when he goes searching for her, believing her to be the one who saved him from the first. After the Yoma attacks him, the Claymore who saved him before does so again, and as she leaves, she gives him permission to join her in her travels as a cook, along with her name; Clare.
2	"The Black Card"; Transliteration: "Kuro no Sho" (Japanese: 黒の書)	Kanji Wakabayashi	Yasuko Kobayashi	April 11, 2007
Clare receives a black card from mysterious man who seems to be working with the organization she works for. Raki witnesses as Clare confronts another Claymore named Elena. Clare explains that when Claymores use too much Yoma power, they eventually succumb to the influence of their Yoma half. Once this occurs, Claymores, knowing they will have to die, often make the choice of dying with human hearts, so as they feel their humanity beginning to slip away they send a black card bearing their individualized insignia to the Claymore that they want to be slain by. Clare's closest friend, Elena, was on the verge of succumbing to her demonic nature and becoming a Yoma, a process called "awakening". Despite Raki's protests, Clare slays Elena, granting her the solace of dying as a human.
3	"The Darkness in Paradise"; Transliteration: "Mahoroba no Yami" (Japanese: まほろばの闇)	Oyunamu	Daisuke Nishida	April 18, 2007
Clare is hired to kill a "Voracious Eater" in Rabona, a holy city where Claymores are not allowed. Forced to use a special drug to disguise her Claymore-specific characteristics, she has difficulty sensing where the Yoma is hiding. She poses as a human in order to infiltrate the church and meet her organization's client. At night, she makes her way to the church again and is caught fighting two suspicious knights, but escapes. The next day, the same two knights barge into the inn room she and Raki are staying at and accuse her of being a Claymore. Raki comes to her defense saying he believes that she is more kind than anyone and doesn't deserve being accused as a monster. After the two knights leave when they find no proof of Clare being a Claymore, she tells him to give up searching for kindness within her as he will ultimately end up disappointed. At night she goes back into the church to look for the Voracious Eater, but the two knights interfere and when it shows up they only complicate the fight between it and Clare. Ultimately, as it is about to kill them, Clare does everything she can to protect them, including jump into the path of its deadly claws.
4	"Clare's Awakening"; Transliteration: "Kurea no Kakusei" (Japanese: クレアの覚醒)	Kim Dong-jun	Daisuke Nishida	April 25, 2007
Clare comes close to awakening when she uses too much of her Yoki (demon energy) in the battle against the Yoma, the Voracious Eater. She intends to commit suicide before her awakening is complete in order to find peace through dying while she is still human, but Raki pleads and begs her not to do it, saying that him meeting her was the best thing to happen to him. His pleas halt Clares awakening transformation, and one of the two knights fighting in the battle later gives Raki a sword in appreciation for what he and Clare have done for them while the other wishes for Raki to grow strong.
5	"Teresa of the Faint Smile"; Transliteration: "Bishō no Teresa" (Japanese: 微笑のテレサ)	Lee Gu-bun	Kazuyuki Fudeyasu	May 2, 2007
This is the beginning of a flashback arc. Teresa, the most powerful Claymore of her era, is hired to kill a group of six Yoma in a village, and easily kills them, and one extra, who is one that had been abusing a young, human, and mute Clare. Since she has no one else to care for her, Clare follows Teresa through the wilderness, despite Teresa's best efforts to abandon her until Teresa decides to accept taking Clare under her wing.
6	"Teresa and Clare"; Transliteration: "Teresa to Kurea" (Japanese: テレサとクレア)	Kim Jong-gu	Kazuyuki Fudeyasu	May 9, 2007
Teresa and Clare approach the next small town, and Clare still refuses to leave Teresa. In the forest at night, the bandit whose hand she cut off the last time they met returns and tries to rape Teresa, but Clare hits him with a thick branch, infuriating him. He begins to stomp on Clare, angering Teresa and making her threaten him while assuring him that while his knowledge about the rule prohibiting Claymores to kill humans is not misinformed, her choice to obey that rule is entirely her own. He flees at her warning, and Clare cries because she feels sorry for Teresa whom Clare says, always looks to be in so much pain even when she's wearing her smile. This deeply moves Teresa. When they arrive in the village and Teresa complete another job, she asks the head of the village to give Clare a home and a caretaker, but Clare refuses with pleas and tears, but Teresa leaves anyway with an unspoken apology and a wish that Clare will grow up a human, live a human life and die a human. Not long after, Teresa sees a troop of bandits on their way to the village she just left, and heads back to find the entire village in razed. When she sees Clare is in danger, she kills every one of the bandits. A hooded figure working for the organization watches, and soon after organizes a group of Claymore to execute her. After Teresa escapes the initial execution attempt, her overseer, Orsay, dispatches the second- through fifth-strongest Claymores to deal with her.
7	"Marked for Death"; Transliteration: "Shisha no Rakuin" (Japanese: 死者の烙印)	Kim Gi-du	Kazuyuki Fudeyasu	May 16, 2007
Claymores number two through five, Priscilla, Ilena, Noel, and Sophia gather together before departing to kill Teresa. Teresa and Clare find lodgings in a village, where shortly after her pursuers find them. Priscilla engages Teresa in single combat, but she is outmatched despite briefly having the upper hand. The other three Claymore pursuers decide that they must assist, and the members of the team begin to release their Yoki in preparation for the combined attack against Teresa.
8	"Awakening"; Transliteration: "Kakusei" (Japanese: 覚醒)	Jang Kil-Yong	Daisuke Nishida	May 23, 2007
Teresa easily defeats the other Claymores, but spares their lives. Priscilla, incensed by her defeat, pursues Teresa and releases too much of her Yoki during the ensuing battle. She awakens, killing Teresa and her former comrades. Clare is left cradling Teresa's severed head.
9	"Those Who Rend Asunder (Part 1)"; Transliteration: "Kiri Saku Mono Tachi (I)" (Japanese: 斬り裂く者たち(I))	Yoshifumi Sueda	Yasuko Kobayashi	May 30, 2007
After Teresa's death, Clare brings her head to Rubel and asks to become a Claymore. Back in the present, Clare is assigned to a party that will be hunting an Awakened Being. After leaving Raki behind at an inn, Clare departs on the mission with her comrades, Miria, Helen, and Deneve. Once they engage the Awakened Being, they are surprised to find that he is male and far stronger than they had expected.
10	"Those Who Rend Asunder (Part 2)"; Transliteration: "Kiri Saku Mono Tachi (II)" (Japanese: 斬り裂く者たち(II))	Kim Jong-gu	Kazuyuki Fudeyasu	June 6, 2007
The battle against the male Awakened Being seems hopeless, despite Helen, Deneve, and Miria demonstrating use of their extraordinary skills. However, Clare refuses to give up, and uses her Yoki-reading skill to dodge the enemy's attacks. Together with Miria, Clare attacks the Awakened Being and kills him. Throughout the entirety of the battle, Galatea, an "eye" for the Organization, reads the Yoki of the four Claymores from a great distance and informs her overseer Ermita of the progression of the battle.
11	"Those Who Rend Asunder (Part 3)"; Transliteration: "Kiri Saku Mono Tachi (III)" (Japanese: 斬り裂く者たち(III))	Kim Yong-ho	Yasuko Kobayashi	June 13, 2007
As the four Claymores recover from their injuries, Miria suggests that the Organization has purposely sent them on a suicide mission, since she discovers that they are all troublemakers who may have partially awakened. Deneve proves this theory by intentionally exceeding her limits in order to heal her wounds. To the Claymores' surprise, she does not awaken from the process. As the four Claymores swear an oath to each other, Mira warns them to avoid top five Claymores: Alicia, Beth Galatea, Ophelia, and Rafaela. She also reveals her intention to destroy the Organization.
12	"The Endless Gravestones (Part 1)"; Transliteration: "Hate Naki Bohyō (I)" (Japanese: 果て無き墓標(I))	Lee Hok-bun	Kazuyuki Fudeyasu	June 20, 2007
Clare is sent to engage another Awakened Being with another team. However, much to Clare's surprise, the team only consists of herself and Ophelia. To make matters worse, Ophelia's lust for blood and the threat of the Awakened Being places both Raki's and Clare's lives in jeopardy.
13	"The Endless Gravestones (Part 2)"; Transliteration: "Hate Naki Bohyō (II)" (Japanese: 果て無き墓標(II))	Kim Min-sun	Yasuko Kobayashi	June 27, 2007
Clare fights Ophelia and loses her right arm as a result. Ilena, who was presumed dead, saves Clare and severely injures Ophelia. Frustrated about the untimely demise of her brother at the hands of Priscilla and her defeat by Ilena, Ophelia becomes enraged and awakens. Clare recuperates and Ilena decides to teach Clare her "Flash Sword" technique.
14	"Qualified to Fight"; Transliteration: "Tatakau Shikaku" (Japanese: 闘う資格)	Eom Sang-yong	Kazuyuki Fudeyasu	July 4, 2007
Shortly after Clare leaves, Ilena is confronted by Rafaela. Elsewhere, aided by addition of Ilena's right arm and the newly acquired "Flash Sword" technique, Clare fights Ophelia. During the battle, Ophelia finally realizes that she has awakened, and becomes paralyzed with shock. Partially thanks to encouragement from remnants of Ophelia's humanity, Clare manages to defeat her.
15	"The Witch's Maw (Part 1)"; Transliteration: "Majo no Agito (I)" (Japanese: 魔女の顎門(I))	Lee Ho-se	Yasuko Kobayashi	July 11, 2007
Unable to contact Clare for three months after Ophelia's awakening and death, the organization decides to send Galatea to track her down. In the meantime, Clare searches for Raki, while disguised and with her energy suppressed, in a local town. She nearly runs into a party of Claymores on a hunt for an Awakened Being. The next day, a bloody and shredded Claymore limps into the town and tells Clare that the party was captured. She sets off to rescue them as, unbeknownst to her at this point, they are being tortured into awakening.
16	"The Witch's Maw (Part 2)"; Transliteration: "Majo no Agito (II)" (Japanese: 魔女の顎門(II))	Kim Jong-gu	Kazuyuki Fudeyasu	July 18, 2007
Clare arrives at a cave inhabited by two Awakened Beings: the "Abyssal One" known as Riful of the West, and her lover and protector Dauf. In her confrontation with Dauf, Clare is rescued by Galatea. They come to learn of a secret arms race between the three Abyssal Ones of the North, West, and South and Riful's intentions to raise as many Awakened troops to join her side as she can before their inevitable confrontation. As Galatea buys time by distracting Dauf, Clare races to save Jean, the only Claymore capable of penetrating Dauf's heavy armor.
17	"The Witch's Maw (Part 3)"; Transliteration: "Majo no Agito (III)" (Japanese: 魔女の顎門(III))	Woo Seung-wook	Daisuke Nishida	July 25, 2007
Clare manages to bring Jean back from an awakened state, gaining her loyalty, and returns to help Galatea. Together, the battle shifts and Dauf is defeated, though Riful saves his life. Clare finally lands a hit on Riful and so she explains about the Northern Kingdom and the name of its ruler, Isley. Galatea returns to her mission objective to return Clare to the organization, but decides to abandon it.
18	"The Carnage in the North (Part 1)"; Transliteration: "Kita no Senran (I)" (Japanese: 北の戦乱(I))	Kim Dong-jun	Daisuke Nishida	August 1, 2007
Rubel and Rafaela confront Clare and Jean, and Rubel gives Clare a mission to go to the northern lands along with twenty-three other Claymores to confront a horde of Awakened Beings and the Abyssal One Isley. He also mentions that Raki has gone there, giving Clare even more incentive to go. Once there, Clare is reunited with Miria, Helen, and Deneve. The twenty-four gathered Claymores divide into five teams and are soon confronted by three Awakened Beings. They literally strike first and attack them in the town of Pieta.
19	"The Carnage in the North (Part 2)"; Transliteration: "Kita no Senran (II)" (Japanese: 北の戦乱(II))	Lee Hok-bun	Kazuyuki Fudeyasu	August 8, 2007
The five teams defeat the three Awakened Beings. Some of them suffer serious wounds, but there are no casualties. Raki is shown wandering in the ruins of a town already destroyed by Yoma, and meets a child-like Priscilla. Priscilla takes a sudden liking to him, and Isley, Priscilla's caretaker, invites Raki to go home with him and Priscilla.
20	"The Carnage in the North (Part 3)"; Transliteration: "Kita no Senran (III)" (Japanese: 北の戦乱(III))	Kim Min-sun	Yasuko Kobayashi	August 15, 2007
Raki, who remains determined to protect Clare, persuades Isley to teach him swordsmanship; meanwhile, Priscilla continues to express a seemingly innocent and peaceful liking for Raki. Deneve confronts her captain, Undine, and the two reconcile by revealing their motivations for becoming Claymores. Flora, Clare's captain, distrusts Clare because of her borrowed arm, but accepts it after Clare reveals it came from Ilena. Undine returns to her team and addresses them rather kindly, puzzling the other Claymores. In the distance, Isley orders his lieutenant, Rigaldo to bring along the full manpower of his awakened followers to annihilate Pieta.
21	"Invasion of Pieta (Part 1)"; Transliteration: "Pieta Shinkō (I)" (Japanese: ピエタ侵攻(I))	Cho Yong-joo	Kazuyuki Fudeyasu	August 22, 2007
Clare and the rest of the Claymores prepare themselves for the next wave of Awakened Beings. Raki, Isley and Priscilla head towards Pieta while the Claymores prepare themselves. The Claymores perform well against the onslaught of Awakened Beings, causing Rigaldo to enter the fray to prevent any more casualties. Displaying his power, he dispatches four of the five captains, killing Veronica, Undine, and Flora instantly, and dealing a blow through Jean's abdomen.
22	"Invasion of Pieta (Part 2)"; Transliteration: "Pieta Shinkō (II)" (Japanese: ピエタ侵攻(II))	Park Ju-young	Daisuke Nishida	August 29, 2007
Clare and the rest of the surviving Claymores continue their battle against Rigaldo. Meanwhile Raki is comforting Priscilla, and Isley tells him the horror of her past. As Rigaldo begins to exclusively attack Miria, the other Claymores attempt to help, but are easily repelled by Rigaldo. Even Miria is quickly outmatched by Rigaldo, and as she is about to be slain, Rigaldo's arm is removed by a seemingly awakened Clare.
23	"Critical Point (Part 1)"; Transliteration: "Rinkai Ten (I)" (Japanese: 臨界点(I))	Woo Seung-wook	Kazuyuki Fudeyasu	September 5, 2007
As Raki travels towards Pieta, Clare reveals that she only allowed her legs to awaken, granting her a massive increase in speed. However, her speed is uncontrollable, allowing Rigaldo to regain the upper hand in the battle. Rigaldo, excited at the prospect of a worthy opponent since his defeat at Isley's hands, releases his full power. Raki arrives, and witnesses the partially awakened Clare. Determined to avenge Jean's apparent death, Clare releases dangerous amounts of energy, and eventually slashes Rigaldo into pieces as Jean regains consciousness.
24	"Critical Point (Part 2)"; Transliteration: "Rinkai Ten (II)" (Japanese: 臨界点(II))	Kim Dong-jun	Daisuke Nishida	September 12, 2007
Unable to return to her normal state, Clare requests that Helen decapitate her so she will not awaken, while Raki takes refuge in an alleyway. Meanwhile, Priscilla recognizes Clare's energy, and believing her to be Teresa, has her memories return. Noting Priscilla's presence, Clare gives chase to Priscilla. Intrigued by the situation, Isley orders his forces to remain on the sidelines as he observes the situation. In response to the situation, the Organization dispatches Galatea to examine the conflict in the north.
25	"For Whose Sake"; Transliteration: "Ta ga Tame ni" (Japanese: 誰が為に)	Lee Hok-bun	Yasuko Kobayashi	September 19, 2007
The fight between Clare and Priscilla rages on inside of a volcano while Isley observes the battle. Priscilla, who does not realize that she is an Awakened Being, easily repels Clare, who she believes to be Teresa. Meanwhile, Jean and Raki travel towards the battleground. As Clare is about to be killed by Priscilla, Miria, Helen, and Deneve save her. They manage to acquire an advantage, but Priscilla fully releases her power, as she had not fully awakened at that point. She effortlessly defeats the three Claymores. Determined to avenge Teresa, Clare fully releases her energy in an effort to defeat her.
26	"To the Successors"; Transliteration: "Uketsugu Mono e" (Japanese: 受け継ぐものへ)	Hiroyuki Tanaka	Yasuko Kobayashi	September 26, 2007
Clare, nearly fully awakened, continues the battle, but Priscilla still dominates the fight with apparent ease, until Clare, spurred by flashbacks of Teresa, finally hits her with multiple devastating attacks. Priscilla reverts to her human form and is about to be killed when Raki intervenes, but Clare, unable to control herself, attacks him as well. Jean takes the blow instead and, although fatally wounded, manages to have Clare revert to her human form, leaving Clare tormented with grief for the death of her comrade. Priscilla is then retrieved by Isley. In the last scenes, Miria, Helen, Deneve, and Clare announce their wish to leave the Organization and depart on separate journeys, with Helen traveling with Deneve, and Raki with Clare.

== See also ==
- List of Claymore chapters
- List of Claymore characters
