= List of Claymore chapters =

The cover of the first tankōbon of the Claymore manga released in Japan by Shueisha. It was released on January 5, 2002.

The chapters of the Claymore manga series are written and drawn by Norihiro Yagi. They began serialization by Shueisha, first in Monthly Shōnen Jump and were later on serialized in Jump Square. The series follows the adventures of Clare, a Claymore, or human-yoma hybrid, and her comrades as they fight for survival in a world filled with yoma, or shapeshifting demons.

The first chapter was released in 2001 in Monthly Shōnen Jump, but afterwards the chapters were released in the Weekly Shōnen Jump on a monthly basis due to the discontinuation of the prior magazine. The manga was later serialized in the Jump Square magazine, Shueisha's replacement for the Monthly Shōnen Jump. 155 chapters in all were released in Japan. An anime adaptation of the manga was announced in the October 2006 edition of Monthly Shōnen Jump. The first episode of the anime aired on April 3, 2007, on Nippon Television, with the last one shown on September 25, 2007.

The chapters have been compiled into 27 tankōbon in Japan by Shueisha. The first volume was released on January 5, 2002, with the 27th released on December 4, 2014. All of the volumes contain six chapters of the original manga, with the exception of the first, which contained only four chapters, and the second, incorporating the next five chapters. Viz Media announced the serialization of the Claymore manga in North America on July 18, 2006, at San Diego Comic-Con. Twenty-seven volumes of the English adaptation of the manga were released by Viz Media.

== Volume list ==
No.	Title	Original release date	English release date
01	Silver-eyed Slayer; Gingan no Zansatsusha (銀眼の惨殺者)	January 5, 2002; 978-4-08-873220-6	April 4, 2006; 978-1-4215-0618-0
Scene 1. "Silver-eyed Slayer" (銀眼の惨殺者, "Gingan no Zansatsusha"); Scene 2. "Claws in the Sky" (天空の爪, "Tenkū no Tsume"); Scene 3. "Memory of a Witch" (魔女の記憶, "Majo no Kioku"); Scene 4. "The Black Card" (黒の書, "Kuro no Sho")
Due to recent attacks by a yoma, a village has been forced to hire the services of a Claymore, a female half-human, half-yoma hybrid with extraordinary powers. A young boy, Raki, befriends the Claymore sent to the village and is subsequently saved by her when she dispatches the yoma. As she leaves, the Claymore tells Raki her name: Clare. When Raki is exiled from the village due to a false belief he is a yoma as well, Clare rescues him. Clare later kills another yoma threatening Raki, and agrees to allow Raki to travel with her in exchange for cooking meals. Clare's supervisor, Rubel, gives her a black card, and Clare meets with its owner, Elena. As Elena had been close to "awakening," or succumbing to her yoma side and becoming a yoma, Clare kills her at her behest.
02	Darkness in Paradise; Mahoroba no Yami (まほろばの闇)	May 1, 2002; 978-4-08-873266-4	June 6, 2006; 978-1-4215-0619-7
Scene 5. "Darkness in Paradise, Part 1" (まほろばの闇 I, "Mahoroba no Yami I"); Scene 6. "Darkness in Paradise, Part 2" (まほろばの闇 II, "Mahoroba no Yami II"); Scene 7. "Darkness in Paradise, Part 3" (まほろばの闇 III, "Mahoroba no Yami III"); Scene 8. "Darkness in Paradise, Part 4" (まほろばの闇 IV, "Mahoroba no Yami IV"); Scene 9. "Darkness in Paradise, Part 5" (まほろばの闇 V, "Mahoroba no Yami V")
Clare is dispatched on a mission to the holy city of Rabona, whose laws prohibit Claymores from entering the city. As a result, Clare is forced to ingest pills that suppress her outward Claymore-specific characteristics, namely her silver eyes. Clare's attempts to find the yoma are made difficult since the pills she is taking makes her unable to sense yōki, or yoma energy. She is further sidetracked by Galk and Sid, a pair of soldiers, who attempt to capture her. They become her allies after she saves them from an ambush by the yoma. Using their aid, she examines all the priests in the temple to root out the yoma. When this fails, Clare realizes the yoma's location, and barely saves Raki from the yoma. Clare fares poorly against the yoma until Raki provides Clare the statue they brought into the city, revealing Clare's sword.
03	Teresa of the Faint Smile; Bishō no Teresa (微笑のテレサ)	November 1, 2002; 978-4-08-873343-2	August 1, 2006; 978-1-4215-0620-3
Scene 10. "Darkness in Paradise, Part 6" (まほろばの闇 VI, "Mahoroba no Yami VI"); Scene 11. "Darkness in Paradise, Part 7" (まほろばの闇 VII, "Mahoroba no Yami VII"); Scene 12. "Teresa of the Faint Smile, Part 1" (微笑のテレサ I, "Bishō no Teresa I"); Scene 13. "Teresa of the Faint Smile, Part 2" (微笑のテレサ II, "Bishō no Teresa II"); Scene 14. "Teresa of the Faint Smile, Part 3" (微笑のテレサ III, "Bishō no Teresa III"); Scene 15. "Teresa of the Faint Smile, Part 4" (微笑のテレサ IV, "Bishō no Teresa IV")
Clare manages to defeat the yoma, but expended too much of her yōki in the process, bringing her on the verge of "awakening." Raki's emotional and moral support enables her to revert to normal. In a flashback, Teresa, the strongest Claymore of her time, inadvertently saves a young, mute Clare. Seeing Teresa as her savior, Clare attempts to follow Teresa, despite Teresa's refusal to allow her to accompany her. After Teresa is accosted by a group of bandits, she allows Clare to follow her after seeing her determination. One of the bandits, who had gotten their hand cut off by Teresa the previous night, returns and attempts to rape Teresa, but is attacked by Clare. The bandit turns on Clare, but Teresa, willing to break Claymore law, which stipulates that Claymores cannot kill humans, forces the bandit to retreat. After this, Clare regains her sense of speech and reveals that she knew of Teresa's sorrow of having no purpose in life, causing Teresa to shed tears and embrace Clare.
04	Marked for Death; Shisha no Rakuin (死者の烙印)	May 1, 2003; 978-4-08-873426-2	October 3, 2006; 978-1-4215-0621-0
Scene 16. "Teresa of the Faint Smile, Part 5" (微笑のテレサ V, "Bishō no Teresa V"); Scene 17. "Teresa of the Faint Smile, Part 6" (微笑のテレサ VI, "Bishō no Teresa VI"); Scene 18. "Marked for Death, Part 1" (死者の烙印 I, "Shisha no Rakuin I"); Scene 19. "Marked for Death, Part 2" (死者の烙印 II, "Shisha no Rakuin II"); Scene 20. "Marked for Death, Part 3" (死者の烙印 III, "Shisha no Rakuin III"); Scene 21. "Marked for Death, Part 4" (死者の烙印 IV, "Shisha no Rakuin IV")
After completing a mission, Teresa leaves Clare with a family willing to adopt her. As soon as she leaves, however, a bandit group attacks the village. Fearing for Clare's life, Teresa returns and slaughters all the bandits after seeing Clare's unconscious body. As a result, Teresa is set to be executed by the Claymore Organization, but she repels her executioners and leaves with Clare. To rectify this, Orsay, Teresa's supervisor, dispatches Claymore numbers two through five, the next strongest four Claymores in the organization besides Teresa, to kill her. These four, Priscilla, Irene, Noel, and Sophia, attack Teresa. Even after all four of them release their yōki, however, they are easily defeated by Teresa, who effortlessly disables Irene, Noel, and Sophia.
05	The Slashers; Kirisakumono-tachi (斬り裂く者たち)	November 4, 2003; 978-4-08-873529-0	December 5, 2006; 978-1-4215-0622-7
Scene 22. "Marked for Death, Part 5" (死者の烙印 V, "Shisha no Rakuin V"); Scene 23. "Marked for Death, Part 6" (死者の烙印 VI, "Shisha no Rakuin VI"); Scene 24. "Marked for Death, Part 7" (死者の烙印 VII, "Shisha no Rakuin VII"); Scene 25. "The Slashers, Part 1" (斬り裂く者たち I, "Kirisakumono-tachi I"); Scene 26. "The Slashers, Part 2" (斬り裂く者たち II, "Kirisakumono-tachi II"); Scene 27. "The Slashers, Part 3" (斬り裂く者たち III, "Kirisakumono-tachi III")
Sensing that Priscilla could surpass her, Teresa moves to kill her, but shows mercy and leaves with Clare. Priscilla, unable to accept her loss, pursues Teresa, and goes beyond her limit, releasing too much of her yōki. As Priscilla turns into an Awakened Being, she decapitates Teresa, dispatches Noel, Sophia, and Irene, and flies away, leaving behind a horrified Clare clutching Teresa's head. In response, Clare takes Teresa's head to a member of the Organization, asking them to place Teresa's flesh inside of her so that she could become a Claymore. In the present, Rubel, Clare's supervisor, allows her to participate in an Awakened Being hunt with fellow Claymores Miria, Deneve, and Helen. However, the Awakened Being is male, a throwback to the times when there were male Claymores, and despite Deneve and Helen displaying extraordinary abilities, they are easily defeated.
06	The Endless Gravestones; Hate-naki Bohyō (果てなき墓標)	April 30, 2004; 978-4-08-873603-7	February 6, 2007; 978-1-4215-1048-4
Scene 28. "The Slashers, Part 4" (斬り裂く者たち IV, "Kirisakumono-tachi IV"); Scene 29. "The Slashers, Part 5" (斬り裂く者たち V, "Kirisakumono-tachi V"); Scene 30. "The Slashers, Part 6" (斬り裂く者たち VI, "Kirisakumono-tachi VI"); Scene 31. "The Endless Gravestones, Part 1" (果てなき墓標 I, "Hate-naki Bohyō I"); Scene 32. "The Endless Gravestones, Part 2" (果てなき墓標 II, "Hate-naki Bohyō II"); Scene 33. "The Endless Gravestones, Part 3" (果てなき墓標 III, "Hate-naki Bohyō III")
Even Miria, demonstrating her unnatural speed, is unable to defeat the Awakened Being. In response, Clare attacks him, and using her yōki-reading abilities, is unharmed. Clare and Miria ultimately slay the Awakened Being. During this time, Ermita, a member of the Organization, had been viewing the battle with the aid of #3 Galatea. After the battle, Miria discusses her theory that the four of them were dispatched on a suicide mission since they were "half-awakened," or had all exceeded their limits, but managed to maintain their humanity. They swear to survive until their next meeting, and Miria warns none of them to engage the top five Claymores of the organization, as their power is too great. Clare is subsequently dispatched on another Awakened Being hunt, paired only with Ophelia, #4 in the Organization. Ophelia's homicidal tendencies nearly cost Raki his life, but Clare manages to flee as Ophelia and the arrived Awakened Being begin to fight.
07	Fit for Battle; Tatakau Shikaku (闘う資格)	November 4, 2004; 978-4-08-873675-4	April 3, 2007; 978-1-4215-1049-1
Scene 34. "The Endless Gravestones, Part 4" (果てなき墓標 IV, "Hate-naki Bohyō IV"); Scene 35. "The Endless Gravestones, Part 5" (果てなき墓標 V, "Hate-naki Bohyō V"); Scene 36. "The Endless Gravestones, Part 6" (果てなき墓標 VI, "Hate-naki Bohyō VI"); Scene 37. "Fit for Battle, Part 1" (闘う資格 I, "Tatakau Shikaku I"); Scene 38. "Fit for Battle, Part 2" (闘う資格 II, "Tatakau Shikaku II"); Scene 39. "Fit for Battle, Part 3" (闘う資格 III, "Tatakau Shikaku III")
Ophelia easily dispatches the Awakened Being and proceeds to pursue Clare. Sending Raki fleeing in the opposite direction, Clare begins to fight Ophelia, but is hopelessly outmatched. She loses an arm, and is about to be killed when a hooded figure arrives. Ophelia attacks, but is soon overwhelmed, and the figure reveals herself to be Illena. Illena takes Clare to her home and teachers her the Quick Sword technique. During this period, Ophelia, distraught at her loss, awakens. In order to allow Clare to properly use the technique, Illena cuts off her remaining arm for Clare to use. Shortly after Clare leaves, Illena is confronted by Rafaela, the Organization's #5, who had been sent to kill her. Clare soon encounters the Awakened Ophelia, who is unaware that she has awakened. After the two fighters come across a lake, Ophelia sees her reflection, and attacks Clare in her rage. Using the Quick Sword, Clare is able to fight on even footing.
08	The Witch's Maw; Majo no Agito (魔女の顎門)	April 28, 2005; 978-4-08-873814-7	June 5, 2007; 978-1-4215-1050-7
Scene 40. "Fit for Battle, Part 4" (闘う資格 IV, "Tatakau Shikaku IV"); Scene 41. "The Witch's Maw, Part 1" (魔女の顎門 I, "Majo no Agito I"); Scene 42. "The Witch's Maw, Part 2" (魔女の顎門 II, "Majo no Agito II"); Scene 43. "The Witch's Maw, Part 3" (魔女の顎門 III, "Majo no Agito III"); Scene 44. "The Witch's Maw, Part 4" (魔女の顎門 IV, "Majo no Agito IV"); Scene 45. "The Witch's Maw, Part 5" (魔女の顎門 V, "Majo no Agito V")
With the aid from the remnants of Ophelia's humanity, Clare manages to defeat her. After the fight she deserts the Organization to search for Raki, resulting in Galatea being dispatched to find her. Clare's search leads to a town, where she narrowly avoids a team of Claymores. Later that day, one of the Claymores limps back into town, mortally wounded. Clare agrees to her request to seek her comrades. Meanwhile, her comrades are being tortured into awakening by two Awakened Beings. One does awaken, but is dispatched by Dauf, one of the two Awakened Beings, after determining that she is too weak. Clare arrives at their location, and Dauf engages her. Dauf overwhelms Clare, who is saved by Galatea. Galatea easily deals with Dauf until a young girl, the other Awakened Being, arrives. With her advice, Dauf regains the advantage, and Clare manages to save Galatea from a mortal attack. They then discuss the young girl, who Galatea reveals to be Riful of the West, one of the three "Abyssal Ones," former number ones in the Organization who awakened.
09	The Deep Abyss of Purgatory; Fukaki Fuchi no Rengoku (深き淵の煉獄)	November 4, 2005; 978-4-08-873878-9	August 7, 2007; 978-1-4215-1051-4
Scene 46. "The Deep Abyss of Purgatory, Part 1" (深き淵の煉獄 I, "Fukaki Fuchi no Rengoku I"); Scene 47. "The Deep Abyss of Purgatory, Part 2" (深き淵の煉獄 II, "Fukaki Fuchi no Rengoku II"); Scene 48. "The Deep Abyss of Purgatory, Part 3" (深き淵の煉獄 III, "Fukaki Fuchi no Rengoku III"); Scene 49. "The Deep Abyss of Purgatory, Part 4" (深き淵の煉獄 IV, "Fukaki Fuchi no Rengoku IV"); Scene 50. "The Battle of the North, Part 1" (北の戦乱 I, "Kita no Senran I"); Scene 51. "The Battle of the North, Part 2" (北の戦乱 II, "Kita no Senran II")
Riful reveals that she has been gathering allies due to the hostility of the Abyssal One of the North. She mentions Priscilla, the Awakened who killed Teresa, and Clare demands more information, but Riful refuses unless Clare can land one hit on her. Clare attempts to do so, but is stopped by Galatea, who dispatches her to find Jean, the remaining tortured Claymore. Clare finds her nearly fully awakened, but manages to have her revert. They return to aid Galatea, and after two successive tries, Jean succeeds in using her special attack to drill through Dauf's body. Before she can deal the killing blow, Riful interferes, but Clare lands a blow on her. Fulfilling her promise, she names Isley, the Abyssal One of the North, and retreats. Galatea, forsaking her mission, leaves as well. Clare and Jean are quickly confronted by Rubel, and threatened with the power of #5 Rafaela, agree to aid in a mission in the North. Once there, Clare is reunited with Helen, Deneve, and Miria.
10	The Battle of the North; Kita no Senran (北の戦乱)	May 2, 2006; 978-4-08-874103-1	October 2, 2007; 978-1-4215-1182-5
052. "The Battle of the North, Part 3" (北の戦乱 III, "Kita no Senran III"); 053. "The Battle of the North, Part 4" (北の戦乱 IV, "Kita no Senran IV"); 054. "The Battle of the North, Part 5" (北の戦乱 V, "Kita no Senran V"); 055. "The Battle of the North, Part 6" (北の戦乱 VI, "Kita no Senran VI"); 056. "The Battle of the North, Part 7" (北の戦乱 VII, "Kita no Senran VII"); 057. "The Assault on Pieta, Part 1" (ピエタ侵攻 I, "Pieta Shinkō I")
Miria forms five teams from the 24 Claymores, with herself, Flora, Undine, Veronica, and Jean as team leaders. Shortly afterwards, three Awakened Beings assault the town, and are engaged by the teams. Through a group effort, all of the Awakened Beings are slain with no casualties. In another town, Raki wanders, and finds a childlike Priscilla. A man comes and takes both back to his home. Once there, he agrees to teach Raki swordsmanship, and reveals that his name is Isley. Leaving the house, Isley orders his lieutenant, Rigaldo, to dispatch all 27 Awakened Beings against the Claymore forces. The Claymores initially fare well due to Miria's strategies. However, Rigaldo himself enters the battle, and displaying his considerable power, effortlessly kills Veronica, Undine, and Flora, and deals a mortal wound through Jean's stomach.
11	Kindred of Paradise; Rakuen no Ketsuzoku (楽園の血族)	November 2, 2006; 978-4-08-874281-6	March 4, 2008; 978-1-4215-1571-7
058. "The Assault on Pieta, Part 2" (ピエタ侵攻 II, "Pieta Shinkō II"); 059. "The Assault on Pieta, Part 3" (ピエタ侵攻 III, "Pieta Shinkō III"); 060. "The Assault on Pieta, Part 4" (ピエタ侵攻 IV, "Pieta Shinkō IV"); 061. "The Assault on Pieta, Part 5" (ピエタ侵攻 V, "Pieta Shinkō V"); 062. "Kindred of Paradise, Part 1" (楽園の血族 I, "Rakuen no Ketsuzoku I"); 063. "Kindred of Paradise, Part 2" (楽園の血族 II, "Rakuen no Ketsuzoku II")
Rigaldo begins assaulting Miria, while easily repelling assaults from Clare, Helen, and Deneve. Ultimately, Rigaldo proves too much for Miria, and is about to kill her when Clare intervenes, cutting off Rigaldo's arm. By partially awakening her legs, Clare gains a tremendous speed advantage, but her lack of control stymies her efforts. She eventually gains control of her legs, and after awakening both of her arms, she slices Rigaldo into pieces. However, she is unable to revert, and in response, Jean, becoming impaled on the blades on Clare's awakened body in the process, aids her in reverting. The other Awakened Beings return, and the remaining Claymores are defeated. The Awakened Beings then split into two groups, heading west and east. In the west, they are confronted by Riful and Dauf, and are summarily annihilated. In the east, they are destroyed by a controlled awakening of the #1 Alicia and her twin sister Beth. However, Isley himself proceeds to the south, where he begins to fight Luciela, the Abyssal One of the South, for control over the southern lands.
12	The Souls of the Fallen; Tamashii to Tomo ni (魂と共に)	April 4, 2007; 978-4-08-874348-6	July 1, 2008; 978-1-4215-1936-4
064. "Kindred of Paradise, Part 3" (楽園の血族 III, "Rakuen no Ketsuzoku III"); 065. "The Souls of the Fallen, Part 1" (魂と共に I, "Tamashii to Tomo ni I"); 066. "The Souls of the Fallen, Part 2" (魂と共に II, "Tamashii to Tomo ni II"); 067. "The Souls of the Fallen, Part 3" (魂と共に III, "Tamashii to Tomo ni III"); 068. "The Defiant Ones, Part 1" (抗しうる者 I, "Kōshi-urumono I"); 069. "The Defiant Ones, Part 2" (抗しうる者 II, "Kōshi-urumono II")
Isley nearly kills Luciela, but the latter manages to escape. Powerless, she is confronted by Rafaela, who breaks her sister's back. Seven years in the future, the new #47, Clarice, joins her comrades in the north on an Awakened Being hunt. However, they are quickly overwhelmed by a group of Awakened Beings. As they lie unconscious, Miria, Helen, and Deneve slay all the Awakened Beings. Elsewhere, Clare continues to search for Raki, and after finding clues as to his location, asks Miria to go the southern lands. Miria fights her to test her skills, both demonstrating their newfound powers. Satisfied, Miria, Clare, and the other Claymores head south to avenge their comrades. At the Organization, Clarice is assigned to care for the highly unstable #4 Miata. Meanwhile, a group of Claymores under the direction of #3 Audrey and #5 Rachel engages Riful, and working in tandem with Audrey, Rachel manages to cut through Riful's body.
13	The Defiant Ones; Kōshi-urumono (抗しうる者)	October 4, 2007; 978-4-08-874430-8	November 4, 2008; 978-1-4215-2337-8
070. "The Defiant Ones, Part 3" (抗しうる者 III, "Kōshi-urumono III"); 071. "The Defiant Ones, Part 4" (抗しうる者 IV, "Kōshi-urumono IV"); 072. "The Defiant Ones, Part 5" (抗しうる者 V, "Kōshi-urumono V"); 073. "A Child Weapon, Part 1" (幼き凶刃 I, "Osanaki Kyōjin I"); Extra Scene 1. "A Warrior's Pride" (戦士の矜持, "Senshi no Kyōji"); Extra Scene 2. "The Phantom and the Wicked Warrior" (幻影と凶戦士, "Gen'ei to Kyō Senshi")
Riful, merely toying with the two Claymores, effortlessly disables them. The Claymores are then retrieved by Clare, Miria, Helen, and Deneve before they are killed. However, as the previous three begin to escape, Clare stays to ask Riful questions on the current balance of power in the world. Riful reveals that she came to the south to kill Isley after his victory over Luciela, but was confronted by Priscilla, who she realized was much stronger than her. Clare then attempts to escape, and despite Riful's efforts, is successful in doing so. Once they return, Audrey awakens, and Miria questions her on the status of the Organization. Elsewhere, due to Clarice's control over Miata, the Organization dispatches her to hunt down Galatea. Through breastfeeding, Clarice is able to pacify Miata, and the two proceed towards Galatea using Miata's enhanced sensory abilities. The four "extra scenes" are gaiden. The first features Teresa encountering and slaying the former #1: Rosemary, now awakened. The second recounts Miria's relationship with her friend Hilda, and her near-awakening experience with Ophelia as antagonist.
14	A Child Weapon; Osanaki Kyōjin (幼き凶刃)	May 2, 2008; 978-4-08-874516-9	March 3, 2009; 978-1-4215-2668-3
074. "The Woman's Prayer" (淑女の祈り, "Shukujo no Inori"); tankōbon: "A Child Weapon, Part 2" (幼き凶刃 II, "Osanaki Kyōjin II"): 075. "Red Rain" (赤き雨, "Akaki Ame"); tankōbon: "A Child Weapon, Part 3" (幼き凶刃 III, "Osanaki Kyōjin III"): 076. "Beyond all Expectations" (思惑の果て, "Omowaku no Hate"); tankōbon: "A Child Weapon, Part 4" (幼き凶刃 IV, "Osanaki Kyōjin IV"): 077. "Codependence" (共依存, "Kyōizon"); tankōbon: "A Child Weapon, Part 5" (幼き凶刃 V, "Osanaki Kyōjin V"): Extra Scene 3. "A Chance Encounter in the North" (北の邂逅, "Kita no Kaikō"); Extra Scene 4. "Untarnished Resolve" (錆なき覚悟, "Sabinaki Kakugo")
Miata's abilities lead her and Clarice to the holy city of Rabona, where they attempt to infiltrate due to the city's prohibition of Claymores. After Miata's cover is blown and the two warriors are pursued by patrolling guards, they are rescued by Sid who leads them to Galk's hideout. The two men explain to Clarice that Rabona has quietly permitted Claymores in their city since a Claymore (which is Clare) has helped them kill a Yoma in their midst 7 years ago. Through information passed by Sid, Clarice and Miata tracks down the now blind Galatea, who has hidden and settled down as a nun in the church. As Miata and Galatea battle in the streets, an Awakened Being named Agatha who has kept herself hidden for years appears in the city causing chaos. Galk, Sid and the rest of Rabona's soldiers attempt to kill Agatha but they are no match for her. As Miata stubbornly battles Galatea, the latter leads her to where Agatha is, leading to a three-way fight. However Galatea and Miata, who has decided to fight Agatha due to her attacking Clarice, are unable to kill her. As a helpless Clarice comes back to Miata's aid and no sign of hope, Clare and the rest of her fellow Claymores appear in time to confront Agatha. The two "extra scenes", continued from Vol. 13, are gaiden. The third scene features Priscilla first meeting and battle with Rigaldo and Isley in the north before she and Isley joined forces. The fourth and last extra scene features Clare during her initiation days and examination before being assigned a number in the Organization.
15	Genesis of War; Tatakai no Rireki (戦いの履歴)	December 4, 2008; 978-4-08-874597-8	November 3, 2009; 978-1-4215-3149-6
078. "Rebellious Warriors" (叛逆の戦士達, "Hangyaku no Senshi-tachi"); tankōbon: "Genesis of War, Part 1" (戦いの履歴 I, "Tatakai no Rireki I"): 079. "Truths in the East" (東の深意, "Higashi no Shin'i"); tankōbon: "Genesis of War, Part 2" (戦いの履歴 II, "Tatakai no Rireki II"): 080. "Seven Years' Time" (七年の星霜, "Nananen no Seisō"); tankōbon: "Genesis of War, Part 3" (戦いの履歴 III, "Tatakai no Rireki III"): 081. "A Distant Pledge" (遥かな契り, "Haruka na Chigiri"); tankōbon: "Genesis of War, Part 4" (戦いの履歴 IV, "Tatakai no Rireki IV"): 082. "The Never Ending Nightmare" (醒めない悪夢, "Samenai Akumu"); tankōbon: "Genesis of War, Part 5" (戦いの履歴 V, "Tatakai no Aireki V"): 083. "A Prospective Reunion" (再会の目途, "Saikai no Mokuto"); tankōbon: "The Lamentation of the Earth, Part 1" (大地の鬼哭 I, "Daichi no Kikoku I")
Although Agatha is dead Clarice finds herself unable to complete her mission. Miria suggests that Clarice and Miata hide in Rabona while her group crushes the Organisation. Galatea criticizes her plan but Miria reveals the Organization's and Yoma's secret origin. The world is bigger than previously realized and the continent they live on is actually a large island, the Organisation having come from a larger continent across the sea. The Organization leads an experiment attempting to create a super soldier to fight in the endless wars on the larger continent. The continent is divided between two warring camps, one of which fights alongside a tribe of dragon-like creatures and one that developed the Yoma technology and created the Awakened to combat the dragons tribe. The Organization's experiment is aimed at fully controlling the Awakened because they often run amok killing both sides. Later Clare hears from Sid that Raki was in the city with a little girl but traveled on to the west. Raki arrives in his home village and kills a Yoma revealed by the girl. They draw attention of Renée but she retreats scared by the girl who turns out to be Priscilla in a childlike form. Before she leaves Renée promises Raki that she will tell Clare that she saw him if they run into each other. Renée is later captured by Riful in the woods outside the village and is forced to awaken a strange unconscious being that turns out to be Rafaela merged with her sister Luciela. Back in the Holy City of Rabona Clare wants to go after Raki and Miria suggests that everyone settle their individual problems before making a decision about continuing their crusade against the Organization and the group splits: Clare goes to the west escorted by Cynthia and Yuma, Helen and Deneve go to the south to visit Deneve's home town. Clare's group enters a town where they encounter a group of Claymores reporting a failure to two angry Organization black cloaks, when an Awakened attacks, former #40 Yuma knocks out the group of Claymores and black cloaks. Clare's group of rogue Claymore's dispatches the Awakened with ease but is then confronted by Clare's former black cloak handler Rubel.
16	The Lamentation of the Earth; Daichi no Kikoku (大地の鬼哭)	May 1, 2009; 978-4-08-874668-5	June 1, 2010; 978-1-4215-3415-2
084. "Messenger of Temptation" (蠱惑の使者, "Kowaku no Shisha"); tankōbon: "The Lamentation of the Earth, Part 2" (大地の鬼哭 II, "Daichi no Kikoku II"): 085. "A Cause Worth Fighting For" (護るべき大義, "Mamorubeki Taigi"); tankōbon: "The Lamentation of the Earth, Part 3" (大地の鬼哭 III, "Daichi no Kikoku III"): 086. "The Violated Taboo" (侵された禁忌, "Okasareta Kinki"); tankōbon: "The Lamentation of the Earth, Part 4" (大地の鬼哭 IV, "Daichi no Kikoku IV"): 087. "Return of the Exterminators" (殲滅者の帰還, "Senmetsusha no Kikan"); tankōbon: "The Lamentation of the Earth, Part 5" (大地の鬼哭 V, "Daichi no Kikoku V"): 088. "Blind Hunters" (盲目の狩人, "Moumoku no Karyūdo"); tankōbon: "The Lamentation of the Earth, Part 6" (大地の鬼哭 VI, "Daichi no Kikoku VI"): 089. "An Unfulfilled Dream (見果てぬ夢, "Mihate nu Yume"); tankōbon: "The Lamentation of the Earth, Part 7" (大地の鬼哭 VII, "Daichi no Kikoku VII")
Rubel proves to be a spy working on failing the experiment. It was him who arranged the extermination of half-awakeneds in Vol. 05, he concealed the very phenomenon of half-awakeneds from the Organization since they are a prospective direction of research. He tells about Renée and Rafaela, Clare's group tries to figure out what his intention was. Helen and Deneve save #8 Dietrich from an awakened. Dietrich suggests kidnapping her so she is not to report about deserters. As they travel Helen and Deneve discover a very strong yoki attempting to hide itself in one of the towns. Heading there, they discover Isley is attempting to mask himself among the population but he uncovers them, goes mad and starts attacking them. However, he gets interrupted by Abyss Feeders in mid-battle. Dietrich helps Helen and Deneve to escape and they witness Isley's death. Deneve and Helen decide to join Clare's group and the Organisation dispatches Alicia and Beth to exterminate Riful.
17	The Claws of Memory; Kioku no Sōga (記憶の爪牙)	November 4, 2009; 978-4-08-874742-2	January 4, 2011; 978-1-4215-3796-2
090. "A World Without Order" (秩序亡き世界, "Chitsujo naki Sekai"); tankōbon: "Claws and Fangs of Memory, Part 1" (記憶の爪牙 I, "Kioku no Sōga I"): 091. "Awakening Movements" (覚醒の胎動, "Mezame no Taidō"); tankōbon: "Claws and Fangs of Memory, Part 2" (記憶の爪牙 II, "Kioku no Sōga II"): 092. "Soul Seal" (魂の刻印, Tamashii no Kokuin); tankōbon: "Claws and Fangs of Memory, Part 3" (記憶の爪牙 III, "Kioku no Sōga III"): 093. "Apostle of Demise" (終焉の使徒, "Shūen no Shito"); tankōbon: "Claws and Fangs of Memory, Part 4" (記憶の爪牙 IV, "Kioku no Sōga IV"): 094. "Purging Blades" (粛清の刃, "Shukusei no Yaiba"); tankōbon: "Claws and Fangs of Memory, Part 5" (記憶の爪牙 V, "Kioku no Sōga V"): 095. "Incarnation of Destruction" (破壊の化身, "Hakai no Keshin"); tankōbon: "Claws and Fangs of Memory, Part 6" (記憶の爪牙 VI, "Kioku no Sōga VI")
Helen and Deneve go to meet Clare while Dietrich delivers a message about this to Miria. Clare's group encounters Dauf and after a short battle Clare proceeds to Riful's lair. As Dauf and Riful are distracted by Renée's escape, Clare enters the castle and, guided by some force, ends up standing before Rafaela and Luciela, then she's drawn into deep mental contact with them. She finds herself in an imaginary world, where she fights Rafaela under the well-known rule: if mind dies, body becomes a corpse. Rafaela is defeated and she gives all her memories to Clare. After this Rafaela and Luciela awaken into a large statue - the Destroyer - mainly unconscious thing with a single addiction to destruction. Riful and Dauf are attacked by Abyss Feeders, Alicia and Beth. The Destroyer fires projectiles which awaken as Avatars of Destruction. Clare describes them as automations, having no vital points, and they cease to function after their energy is exhausted if not restored through their parasitic abilities. Then it's shown that one projectile has impaled Beth.
18	Ashes of Lautrec; Rōtoreku no Kaijin (ﾛｰﾄﾚｸの灰燼)	July 2, 2010; 978-4-08-870038-0	June 7, 2011; 978-1-421-53935-5
096. "Eye of Selfish Desires" (私欲の眼, "Shiyoku no Manako"); tankōbon: "Ashes of Lautrec I" (ﾛｰﾄﾚｸの灰燼 I, "Rōtoreku no Kaijin I"): 097. "Bitter Tears of Desperation" (窮余の紅涙, "Kyūyo no Kōrui"); tankōbon: "Ashes of Lautrec II" (ﾛｰﾄﾚｸの灰燼 II, "Rōtoreku no Kaijin II"): 098. "Wailing Cleave" (慟哭の劈開, "Dōkoku no Hekikai"); tankōbon: "Ashes of Lautrec III" (ﾛｰﾄﾚｸの灰燼 III, "Rōtoreku no Kaijin III"): 099. "Craving Flesh And Blood" (血肉への渇望, "Chiniku e no Katsubō"); tankōbon: "Ashes of Lautrec IV" (ﾛｰﾄﾚｸの灰燼 IV, "Rōtoreku no Kaijin IV"): 100. "Meeting with the Bitter Enemy" (仇敵邂逅, "Kyūteki Kaikō"); tankōbon: "Ashes of Lautrec V" (ﾛｰﾄﾚｸの灰燼 V, "Rōtoreku no Kaijin V"): 101. "Wedge" (楔, "Kusabi"); tankōbon: "Ashes of Lautrec VI" (ﾛｰﾄﾚｸの灰燼 VI, "Rōtoreku no Kaijin VI")
Raki is in a strange state, infested with Avatars, and captured by the Organization. Alicia incapacitates Riful, but is interrupted as awakened Beth confronts Priscilla. Alicia goes to help Beth, awakens, and together they attack Priscilla. Nearly bored by the battle Priscilla explains that she was just passing by and is not particularly interested in such weaklings. Eventually she kills them single-handedly. Then she inflicts deadly wounds on Dauf and Riful and faces Clare. Enraged Clare fights Priscilla desperately, but to no avail. She tries to awaken, but suddenly reverts to human form. Deneve explains this as a wedge Clare developed after Jean's death. Deneve and Helen escape with injured Clare using Avatars of the second wave as a cover.
19	Illusions in the Heart; Gen'ei o Mune ni (幻影を胸に)	December 3, 2010; 978-4-08-870134-9	November 1, 2011; 978-1-4215-4078-8
102. "Descending Demon" (舞い降りた悪魔, "Maiorita Akuma"); tankōbon: "Ashes of Lautrec VII" (ﾛｰﾄﾚｸの灰燼 VII, "Rōtoreku no Kaijin VII"): 103. "Reminiscence of the Abyss" (深淵の追憶, "Shin'en no Tsuioku"); tankōbon: "Ashes of Lautrec VIII" (ﾛｰﾄﾚｸの灰燼 VIII, "Rōtoreku no Kaijin VIII"): 104. "Reverberating Anguish" (悲しみの残響, "Kanashimi no Zankyō"); tankōbon: "Ashes of Lautrec IX" (ﾛｰﾄﾚｸの灰燼 IX, "Rōtoreku no Kaijin IX"): 105. "Whereabouts of Vengeance" (復讐の行方, "Fukushū no Yukue"); tankōbon: "Ashes of Lautrec X" (ﾛｰﾄﾚｸの灰燼 X, "Rōtoreku no Kaijin X"): 106. "Surprise Attack of the Phantom" (幻影の奇襲, "Gen'ei no Kishū"); tankōbon: "Illusions in the Heart I" (幻影を胸に I, "Gen'ei o Mune ni I"): 107. "Phantom and Illusion" (幻影と幻覚, "Gen'ei to Genkaku"); tankōbon: "Illusions in the Heart II" (幻影を胸に II, "Gen'ei o Mune ni II")
Weakened and cornered by Avatars, Yuma is saved by Dietrich who brings some Abyssal Feeders along and matches them against Avatars. Priscilla chases Clare's group, but is intercepted by Dauf in his awakened form and infested with Avatars. He's apparently mad and more powerful than usual to the point that he batters Priscilla into the ground with his fists. Something slips from his left hand what appears to be Riful's upper body, Helen identifies it as a corpse. Under Dauf's powerful attacks Priscilla regains her memories, kills him and sets out to kill Teresa once again in the form of Clare. Deneve chooses the Destroyer as the next cover against Priscilla. Priscilla crashes the statue with one epic blow, but the Destroyer takes its true form resembling a swirling mass of tentacles and female bodies that drains life from everything it touches. The Destroyer swallows Clare and attacks Priscilla. Miria invades the Organization's HQ, brings down Claymores, but falls slain under manipulation by #10 Raftela, the Organization's anti-warrior warrior.
20	Demon's Claw Remains; Masō no Zanshi (魔爪の残滓)	June 3, 2011; 978-4-08-870241-4	July 3, 2012; 978-1-421-54211-9
108. "Impending Peril of the Holy City" (聖都の禍機, "Seito no Kaki"); tankōbon: "Illusions in the Heart III" (幻影を胸に III, "Gen'ei o Mune ni III"): 109. "Bond of the Warriors" (戦士たちの絆, "Senshi-tachi no Kizuna"); tankōbon: "Illusions in the Heart IV" (幻影を胸に IV, "Gen'ei o Mune ni IV"): 110. "Lingering Scent" (残り香, "Nokoriga"); tankōbon: "Demon's Claw Remains I" (魔爪の残滓 I, "Masō no Zanshi I"): 111. "Reason of the Winged" (羽根持ちの所以, "Hanemochi no Yuen"); tankōbon: "Demon's Claw Remains II" (魔爪の残滓 II, "Masō no Zanshi II"): 112. "A Reason to Fight and the Path to Take" (闘う理由と進むべき道, "Tatakau Riyū to Susumubeki Michi"); tankōbon: "Demon's Claw Remains III" (魔爪の残滓 III, "Masō no Zanshi III"): 113. "Brunt of Rebellion" (反逆の矛先, "Hangyaku no Hokosaki"); tankōbon: "Demon's Claw Remains IV" (魔爪の残滓 IV, "Masō no Zanshi IV")
Deneve, Helen, Yuma, Cynthia and Dietrich arrive to Rabona and find it overwhelmed by youma and awakened beings. Looks like the Organization arranged the youma attack as a punishment for Miria's assault. Helen explains what happened to Clare. She goes to the forest, shows a big grotesque knot of flesh and calls it Clare. In this form Clare and the Destroyer seal Priscilla's movements. The assault proved to be not the first one devised by the Organization: Dietrich tells her home town suffered the same fate after the town's chief had an argument with a man in black. Tabitha and Dietrich join the Deneve group and together they go after Miria. On their way they save #7 Anastasia from a group of male awakened beings and destroy a secret facility nearby where male half-youma hybrids are made. The hybrids were delivered to a target town and once they wake up, they soon awaken and attack the town. That's how the Organization arranged punishments. Daae proceeds with his project: resurrecting three #1 warriors of previous generations. The Organization gets informed about the raid on the research facility, gathers all the warriors and orders them to destroy the rebellious group. Though Miria appears once again. Claymores understood she let them live and so were unable to kill her back then.
21	Corpse of the Witch; Majo no Shikabane (魔女の屍)	December 2, 2011; 978-4-08-870347-3	November 6, 2012; 978-1-421-54880-7
114. "The Phantom Charge" (幻影の進撃, "Gen'ei no Shingeki"); tankōbon: "Corpse of the Witch I" (魔女の屍 I, "Majo no Shikabane I"): 115. "A Strong Male Warrior" (剛健なる男戦士, "Gōken Naru Otoko Senshi"); tankōbon: "Corpse of the Witch II" (魔女の屍 II, "Majo no Shikabane II"): 116. "The Three Forbidden Warriors" (禁断の三戦士, "Kindan no San Senshi"); tankōbon: "Corpse of the Witch III" (魔女の屍 III, "Majo no Shikabane III"): 117. "The Reason for the Nickname" (異名の由縁, "Imyō no Yuen"); tankōbon: "Corpse of the Witch IV" (魔女の屍 IV, "Majo no Shikabane IV"): 118. "The Life and Death Struggle at Staff" (スタフの死闘, "Sutafu no Shitō"); tankōbon: "Corpse of the Witch V" (魔女の屍 V, "Majo no Shikabane V"): 119. "The Hatred's Cause and Effect" (憎しみの因果, "Nikushimi no Inga"); tankōbon: "Corpse of the Witch VI" (魔女の屍 VI, "Majo no Shikabane VI")
22	Claws and Fangs of the Abyss; Shinen no Tsume to Kiba (深淵の爪と牙)	June 4, 2012; 978-4-08-870434-0	May 7, 2013; 978-1-421-55238-5
120. "Awakening and Abyss" (覚醒と深淵, "Kakusei to Shinen"); tankōbon: Claws and Fangs of the Abyss I (深淵の爪と牙 I, "Shinen no Tsume to Kiba I"): 121. "Resurrected Corpses" (死体はよみがえる, "Shitai wa Yomigaeru"); tankōbon: Claws and Fangs of the Abyss II (深淵の爪と牙 II, "Shinen no Tsume to Kiba II"): 122. "Plucked Wings" (翼は撥, "Tsubasa wa Bachi"); tankōbon: Claws and Fangs of the Abyss III (深淵の爪と牙 III, "Shinen no Tsume to Kiba III"): 123. "The Elegant's Wings" (翼のエレガンス, "Tsubasa no Eregansu"); tankōbon: Claws and Fangs of the Abyss IV (深淵の爪と牙 IV, "Shinen no Tsume to Kiba IV"): 124. "The Warrior's Wing" (ウィングの戦士, "Uingu no senshi"); tankōbon: Claws and Fangs of the Abyss V (深淵の爪と牙 V, "Shinen no Tsume to Kiba V"): 125. "A Second End" (終わりによれば、, "Owari ni Yoreba,"); tankōbon: Claws and Fangs of the Abyss VI (深淵の爪と牙 VI, "Shinen no Tsume to Kiba VI")
23	Warrior's Mark; Senshi no Kokuin (戦士の刻印)	December 4, 2012; 978-4-08-870557-6	October 24, 2013; 978-1-421-55883-7
126. "Parting and Demise" (訣別と終焉, "Ketsubetsu to Shūen"); tankōbon: Claws and Fangs of the Abyss VII (深淵の爪と牙 VII, "Shinen no Tsume to Kiba VII"): 127. "Where the Abyssal One is Headed" (深淵の向かう先, "Shin'en no Mukau Saki"); tankōbon: Claws and Fangs of the Abyss VIII (深淵の爪と牙 VIII, "Shinen no Tsume to Kiba VIII"): 128. "The Destiny of the Holy City" (聖都の存亡, "Sei-to no Sonbō"); tankōbon: "Warrior's Mark I" (戦士の刻印 I, "Senshi no Kokuin I"): 129. "The Warrior's Return" (戦士の帰還, "Senshi no Kikan"); tankōbon: "Warrior's Mark II" (戦士の刻印 II, "Senshi no Kokuin II"): 130. "The Last Battlefield" (最後の戰陣, "Saigo no Senjin"); tankōbon: "Warrior's Mark III" (戦士の刻印 III, "Senshi no Kokuin III"): 131. "The Skirmish in The Holy City" (聖都の前哨, "Seito no Zenshō"); tankōbon: "Warrior's Mark IV" (戦士の刻印 IV, "Senshi no Kokuin IV")
24	Army of the Underworld; Meifu no Gunzei (冥府の軍勢)	June 4, 2013; 978-4-08-870688-7	May 6, 2014; 978-1-421-56549-1
132. "Those Free to Loiter" (彷徨える者, "Samayoeru Mono"); tankōbon: "Warrior's Mark V" (戦士の刻印 V, "Senshi no Kokuin V"): 133. "Resonance and Rally" (共鳴と再会, "Kyōmei to Saikai"); tankōbon: "Army of the Underworld I" (冥府の軍勢 I, "Meifu no Gunzei I"): 134. "The Troops of Hades" (冥府の軍勢, "Meifu no Gunzei"); tankōbon: "Army of the Underworld II" (冥府の軍勢 II, "Meifu no Gunzei II"): 135. "The Eyelid's Memory" (瞼の記憶, "Mabuta no Kioku"); tankōbon: "Army of the Underworld III" (冥府の軍勢 III, "Meifu no Gunzei III"): 136. "Gnawing Malice" (蝕む悪意, "Mushibamu Akui"); tankōbon: "Army of the Underworld IV" (冥府の軍勢 IV, "Meifu no Gunzei IV"): 137. "And Her Name Is..." (その者の名は?, "Sono-mono no Na wa"); tankōbon: "Army of the Underworld V" (冥府の軍勢 V, "Meifu no Gunzei V")
25	Sword of the Dark Deep; Yamiwada no Tsurugi (やみわだの剣)	December 4, 2013; 978-4-08-870858-4	November 4, 2014; 978-1-421-57386-1
138. "Exposed Face" (あばかれたかお, "Abakareta Kao"); tankōbon: "Army of the Netherworld VI" (冥府の軍勢 VI, "Meifu no Gunzei VI"): 139. "The Holy City of Annihilation" (殲滅の聖都, "Senmetsu no Sei-to"); tankōbon: "Sword of the Dark Deep I" (やみわだの剣 I, "Yamiwada no Tsurugi I"): 140. "A Pure, Naked Blade" (無垢なる白刃, "Muku naru Hakujin"); tankōbon: "Sword of the Dark Deep II" (やみわだの剣 II, "Yamiwada no Tsurugi II"): 141. "Impulse Towards Darkness" (闇への衝動, "Yami e no Shōdō"); tankōbon: "Sword of the Dark Deep III" (やみわだの剣 III, "Yamiwada no Tsurugi III"): 142. "Magic" (魔法, "Mahō"); tankōbon: "Sword of the Dark Deep IV" (やみわだの剣 IV, "Yamiwada no Tsurugi IV"): 143. "The Bonds Left Behind" (遺された楔, "Nokosa reta kusabi"); tankōbon: "Sword of the Dark Deep V" (やみわだの剣 V, "Yamiwada no Tsurugi V")
26	A Blade from Far Away; Kanata kara no Yaiba (彼方からの刃)	June 4, 2014; 978-4-08-880076-9	March 3, 2015; 978-1-421-57866-8
144. "Final Reunion" (時果ての再会, "Toki hate no Saikai"); tankōbon: "A Blade from Far Away I" (彼方からの刃 I, "Kanata kara no Yaiba I"): 145. "The Price of Hope" (希望の代価, "Kibō no Daika"); tankōbon: "A Blade from Far Away II" (彼方からの刃 II, "Kanata kara no Yaiba II"): 146. "Sustenance of the Weak" (弱者の糧, "Jakusha no Kate"); tankōbon: "A Blade from Far Away III" (彼方からの刃 III, "Kanata kara no Yaiba III"): 147. "The Fleeting Flash of a Sword" (刹那の剣閃, "Setsuna no Ken Sen"); tankōbon: "A Blade from Far Away IV" (彼方からの刃 IV, "Kanata kara no Yaiba IV"): 148. "Blade From Afar" (彼方からの刃, "Kanata kara no Yaiba"); tankōbon: "A Blade from Far Away V" (彼方からの刃 V, "Kanata kara no Yaiba V"): 149. "The Abyss of Remembrance" (追憶の淵より, "Tsuioku no fuchi yori"); tankōbon: "A Blade from Far Away VI" (彼方からの刃 VI, "Kanata kara no Yaiba VI")
27	Silver-eyed Warriors; Gingan no Senshi-tachi (銀眼の戦士たち)	December 4, 2014; 978-4-08-880228-2	October 6, 2015; 978-1-42-158171-2
150. "The Returning Blade" (今ひとたびの剣, "Ima hitotabi no Ken"); tankōbon: "Silver-eyed Warriors I" (銀眼の戦士たち I, "Gingan no Senshi-tachi I"): 151. "The Peerless Title" (無二の称号, "Muni no Shōgō"); tankōbon: "Silver-eyed Warriors II" (銀眼の戦士たち II, "Gingan no Senshi-tachi II"): 152. "The Call of Fate" (宿命が呼ぶ声, "Shukumei ga yobu koe"); tankōbon: "Silver-eyed Warriors III" (銀眼の戦士たち III, "Gingan no Senshi-tachi III"): 153. "That Which Is Carried" (背負いしもの, "Shoishi mono"); tankōbon: "Silver-eyed Warriors IV" (銀眼の戦士たち IV, "Gingan no Senshi-tachi IV"): 154. "Strength and Heart" (力と心, "Chikara to Kokoro"); tankōbon: "Silver-eyed Warriors V" (銀眼の戦士たち V, "Gingan no Senshi-tachi V"): Last Scene. "Proof of Life" (生の証, "Nama no Akashi"); tankōbon: "Silver-eyed Warriors VI" (銀眼の戦士たち VI, "Gingan no Senshi-tachi VI")

== Chapter not in tankōbon format ==
This single extra chapter has not been published in a tankōbon volume.

- Extra Scene 5. "Warriors Dawn" (戦士黎明編, "Senshi reimei-hen")

== See also ==
- List of Claymore episodes
- List of Claymore characters
