= Danzai no Hana: Guilty Sky =

2007 single by Riyu Kosaka

"断罪の花: Guilty Sky [Danzai no Hana: Guilty Sky]"

Single by Riyu Kosaka

from the album Every Struggle
- Released: May 16, 2007
- Genre: Pop rock; folk rock
- Label: Avex Trax
- Songwriter(s): Lyrics: Riyu Kosaka; Composer: Love+Hate

Riyu Kosaka singles chronology
"Yamato Nadeshiko" (2006)	"断罪の花: Guilty Sky [Danzai no Hana: Guilty Sky]" (2007)	"Dober Man" (2007)

CD + DVD
- CD + DVD Cover

"Danzai no Hana: Guilty Sky" (断罪の花: Guilty Sky, literally Conviction's Flower) is a single by Riyu Kosaka released on May 16, 2007. This is her third solo single. It was released as both a CD, and a CD+DVD. Danzai no Hana was used as one of the outro songs to the anime Claymore.

== CD Side ==
1. 断罪の花: Guilty Sky (Danzai no Hana: Guilty Sky)
2. Ignore
3. Danzai no Hana: Guilty Sky [English version]
4. 断罪の花: Guilty Sky instrumental
5. Ignore instrumental

== DVD Side ==
1. 断罪の花: Guilty Sky Music Clip
2. 断罪の花: Guilty Sky "Claymore" Edit

== Sources ==
- https://web.archive.org/web/20080702180206/http://bmf.i-revo.jp/beforu/disco.html
- http://www.neowing.co.jp/detailview.html?KEY=AVCA-26298
