= Ariadne in the Blue Sky =

Japanese manga series

- First tankōbon volume cover

蒼穹のアリアドネ (Sōkyū no Ariadone)
- Genre: Adventure; Fantasy
- Manga
- Written by: Norihiro Yagi
- Published by: Shogakukan
- Imprint: Shōnen Sunday Comics
- Magazine: Weekly Shōnen Sunday (2017–2022); Sunday Webry (2022–2023)
- Original run: December 6, 2017 – February 9, 2023
- Volumes: 22
- icon

Ariadne in the Blue Sky (Japanese: 蒼穹のアリアドネ, Hepburn: Sōkyū no Ariadone) is a Japanese manga series written and illustrated by Norihiro Yagi. It was serialized in Shogakukan's shōnen manga magazine Weekly Shōnen Sunday from December 2017 to September 2022, and later transferred to the online platform Sunday Webry, where it ran from September 2022 to February 2023. Its chapters were collected in 22 tankōbon volumes.

== Synopsis ==
The story centers around a certain boy who lives alone away from people, but harbors a special dream. One day, he meets a lone girl, and the story begins as he becomes part of the girl's destiny.

== Publication ==
Written and illustrated by Norihiro Yagi, Ariadne in the Blue Sky was serialized in Shogakukan's shōnen manga magazine Weekly Shōnen Sunday from December 6, 2017, to September 14, 2022. The manga was transferred to Shogakukan's online platform Sunday Webry on September 29, 2022, and finished on February 9, 2023. Shogakukan collected its chapters in 22 tankōbon volumes, released from April 18, 2018, to March 16, 2023.

=== Volumes ===
No.	Japanese release date	Japanese ISBN
1	April 18, 2018	978-4-09-128244-6
1. "The Flying City of the Heavens" (天空の飛行都市, Tenkū no Hikō Toshi); 2. "Knight of the Blue Skies" (蒼穹の騎士, Sōkyū no Kishi); 3. "Beginning of the Journey" (旅の始まり, Tabi no Hajimari); 4. "The Unknown World" (知らない世界, Shiranai Sekai); 5. "Thaick Town" (ターイックの街, Tāikku no Machi); 6. "Urban Warfare" (市街戦, Shigai-sen); 7. "The Royal Imperial Guard" (王家直属近衛兵, Ōke Chokuzoku Konoehei)
2	July 18, 2018	978-4-09-128336-8
8. "A Special Meaning" (特別な意味, Tokubetsuna Imi); 9. "Strongest Man in the World" (世界で一番強い男, Sekai de Ichiban Tsuyoi Otoko); 10. "Someone Who Will Move Forward" (先へ進む者, Saki e Susumu Mono); 11. "Everyone's Own Way of Fighting" (それぞれの闘い方, Sorezore no Tatakai-kata); 12. "The Goddess of Peace" (平和の女神, Heiwa no Megami); 13. "Shiu Tribe Village" (シウ族の村, Shiu-zoku no Mura); 14. "Odd Feeling in the Mine" (鉱山での違和感, Kōzan de no Iwakan); 15. "Three Eyes Dogs" (スリーアイズドッグ, Surīa Izu Doggu); 16. "Travelers" (旅人, Tabibito); 17. "The Shiu Tribe's Situation" (シウ族の事情, Shiu-zoku no Jijō)
3	October 18, 2018	978-4-09-128556-0
18. "Battle in the Darkness" (闇の中の戦い, Yami no Naka no Tatakai); 19. "Battle in the Tunnels" (坑道の戦い, Kōdō no Tatakai); 20. "The Living Things Called Weapons" (兵器と呼ばれる生き物, Heiki to Yoba Reru Ikimono); 21. "Suspicious Individual" (得体の知れない奴, Etaino Shirenai Yatsu); 22. "Ashen Way of Life" (灰色の生き方, Haiiro no Ikikata); 23. "Traversing the Valley" (渓谷を越えて, Keikoku o Koete); 24. "The Labyrinth Forest" (迷宮の森, Meikyū no Mori); 25. "Dense Forest Combat" (密林の戦闘, Mitsurin no Sentō); 26. "VS. Lululola" (VS．ルルロラ, VS. Rururora); 27. "Lufreya, Dominion of Light" (光の領地ルフレア, Hikari no Ryōchi Rufurea)
4	February 18, 2019	978-4-09-128776-2
28. "Dialogue with the Teacher" (導士との問答, Dōshi to no Mondō); 29. "A Change of Clothes" (召し換えの儀, Meshi Kae no gi); 30. "Cemetery of the Loosa King" (ルーサ王の墓所, Rūsa-ō no Bosho); 31. "Sudden Transformation" (豹変, Hyōhen); 32. "Al-mi'raj" (角を持つ兎(アルミラージ), Arumirāji); 33. "The Loosa Tribe's Gravekeepers" (ルーサ族の墓守り, Rūsa-zoku no Hakamori); 34. "To the Heart of the Underground Ruins" (地下遺跡の核心へ, Chika Iseki no Kakushin e); 35. "True Nature of the "Horned Ones"" (角持ち"の本領, "Tsunomochi" no Honryō); 36. "Photons vs. Lunar Photons" (光子(フオトン)vs．月光(ルナフオトン), Fuoton vs. Runafuoton); 37. "How to Defeat the Loosa Tribe" (ルーサ族の攻略法, Rūsa-zoku no Kōryaku-hō)
5	May 17, 2019	978-4-09-129158-5
38. "A True Attack" (本物の技, Honmono no Waza); 39. "Awakening" (覚醒, Kakusei); 40. "Returning to the Past" (過去返り, Kako Gaeri); 41. "Spiral Blast" (スパイラルブラスト, Supairaru Burasuto); 42. "To the Next Path" (次の道へ, Tsugi no Michi e); 43. "Shriek of the Land" (大地の悲鳴, Daichi no Himei); 44. "The Rato Tribe" (ラト族, Rato-zoku); 45. "Dragonbane" (竜退治(ドラゴンベイン), Doragonbein); 46. "The Strongest Creatures in the World" (世界最強の生物, Sekai Saikyō no Seibutsu); 47. "Noish's Reason" (ノイシュの理由, Noishu no Riyū)
6	August 16, 2019	978-4-09-129318-3
48. "The Differences Between Humans and the Rato Tribe" (ヒト族とラト族の違い, Hito-zoku to Rato-zoku no Chigai); 49. "Nines" (精鋭部隊(ナインス), Nainsu); 50. "Battle of the Different Races" (異種族の戦い, Ishuzoku no Tatakai); 51. "Abominable History" (忌むべき歴史, Imubeki Rekishi); 52. "Tiger Energy" (虎気, Koki); 53. "The Meaning of the Fists" (拳の意味, Kobushi no Imi); 54. "Skirmishes" (局地戦, Kyokuchisen); 55. "50m Class" (50m級, 50-Mētoru Kyū); 56. "The Town Where Family Is" (家族のいる町, Kazoku no Iru Machi); 57. "Bloodlust and Friendship" (殺気と友愛, Sakki to Yūai)
7	November 18, 2019	978-4-09-129440-1
58. "The People Wrapped in Light" (光に包まれた人々, Hikari ni Tsutsumareta Hitobito); 59. "Outlook" (眺望, Chōbō); 60. "Never Again" (もう二度と, Mō Nidoto); 61. "A New Journey" (新たなる旅立ち, Aratanaru Tabidachi); 62. "Burning Mountain Range" (燃える山脈, Moeru Sanmyaku); 63. "Ashes" (灰燼, Kaijin); 64. "Rockwell" (ロックウェル, Rokkueru); 65. "Whip of Virtue" (戒律の鞭, Kairitsu no Muchi); 66. "Request of the Vice Chief" (副長の頼み, Fukuchō no Tanomi); 67. "Hunting Seven Swords" (7剣狩り, 7-kengari)
8	February 18, 2020	978-4-09-129554-5
68. "Total War" (総力戦, Sōryokusen); 69. "The Ruins of the Gigantic City" (巨大都市の廃墟, Kyodai Toshi no Haikyo); 70. "Leana's Secret" (レアナの秘密, Reana no Himitsu); 71. "Essence of a Queen" (女王の本質, Joō no Honshitsu); 72. "Caligula" (カリギュラ, Karigyura); 73. "One Desires Power" (ある者は力を, Aru Mono wa Chikara o); 74. "The Kick Reached in the Mind" (思いに至る蹴り, Omoi ni Itaru Keri); 75. "Clad in Lunar Photons" (月光(ルナフォトン)を纏う, Runa Foton o Matou); 76. "Wiefe Tribe" (ヴィーフェ族, Vīfe-zoku); 77. "The Town of Arcnemy" (アークネミーの街, Ākunemī no Machi)
9	May 18, 2020	978-4-09-850071-0
78. "Divine Stage of Battle" (闘いの神台, Tatakai no Shindai); 79. "Scales of Judgement" (審判の天秤, Shinpan no Tenbin); 80. "The Power to Defeat Them" (倒せる力, Taoseru Chikara); 81. "In the Imagination" (イメージの中, Imēji no Naka); 82. "The Many Lights of the Wide Starry Skies" (あまねく星空の幾つもの光, Amaneku Hoshizora no Ikutsumo no Hikari); 83. "Discussion at the Round Table" (円卓の話し合い, Entaku no Hanashiai); 84. "The Town of Nomad" (ノマドの街, Nomado no Machi); 85. "Contents of the Wallet" (財布の中身, Saifu no Nakami); 86. "Underground River" (地下河川, Chika Kasen); 87. "Lionheart" (獅子心団(ライオンハート), Shishishindan (Raionhāto))
10	August 18, 2020	978-4-09-850172-4
88. "Reunion" (再会, Saikai); 89. "Flash" (一閃, Issen); 90. "Collision" (衝突, Shōtotsu); 91. "Overwhelming" (圧倒, Attō); 92. "Duel" (決闘, Kettō); 93. "Turning Point" (転換点, Tenkanten); 94. "Surge" (うねり, Uneri); 95. "Sniping" (狙撃, Sogeki); 96. "Sniper Rifle" (狙撃銃, Sogekijū); 97. "30000 meters" (30000m(メートル), 30000 Mētoru)
11	November 18, 2020	978-4-09-850279-0
98. "Bad Feeling" (嫌な予感, Iyana Yokan); 99. "Survivor" (生き残り, Ikinokori); 100. "Invited Land" (招待地, Shōtaichi); 101. "Killing Two Birds with One Stone" (一石二鳥, Isseki Nichō); 102. "Destination" (目指す地, Mezasu chi); 103. "Grande Rocks" (大地神の岩群(グランデロックス), Gurande Rokkusu); 104. "Overwhelming Power" (圧倒的な力, Attōtekina Chikara); 105. "Gladias of the Red Arms" (赤腕のグラディアス, Sekiwan no Guradiasu); 106. "Party Time" (宴の時間(パーティータイム), Utage no Jikan (Pātī Taimu)); 107. "A Predicament" (窮地へ, Kyūchi e)
12	February 18, 2021	978-4-09-850392-6
108. "A Death Wish" (死にたがり, Shinitagari); 109. "Three Duels" (3組の決闘, 3-kumi no Kettō); 110. "Need a Hand?" (手を貸そうか, Te o Kasou ka); 111. "Synchronicity" (シンクロニシティ, Shinkuronishiti); 112. "Countdown" (カウントダウン, Kauntodaun); 113. "Recollection" (想起, Sōki); 114. "6 Years Ago" (6年前, 6-nen Mae); 115. "Pipi and Meme" (ピピとメメ, Pipi to Meme); 116. "True Name" (真の名, Shin no Na); 117. "Child of the Great Emperor" (大帝の子, Taitei no Ko)
13	May 18, 2021	978-4-09-850528-9
118. "Flying Cities" (飛行都市, Hikō Toshi); 119. "Collapse of the World" (世界の崩壊, Sekai no Hōkai); 120. "Abominable Past" (忌むべき過去, Imubeki Kako); 121. "Worthless" (取るに足りない, Toru ni Tarinai); 122. "Beautiful, and Fleeting" (美しく、儚い, Utsukushiku, Hakanai); 123. "Flying Cities" (飛行都市, Hikō Toshi); 124. "Bundle of Light" (光の束, Hikari no Taba); 125. "Under the Starry Sky" (星空の下で, Hoshizora no Shita de); 126. "Surprise Attack" (奇襲, Kishū); 127. "Greatest Military Powers" (最高戦力, Saikō Senryoku)
14	August 18, 2021	978-4-09-850643-9
128. "Rift in Space-time" (時空の狭間, Jikū no Hazama); 129. "Small Number" (これっぽっち, Koreppocchi); 130. "Biove Kingdom" (ビオーヴ王国, Biōvu Ōkoku); 131. "Commencing Intrusion" (侵入開始, Shin'nyū Kaishi); 132. "Laboratory" (研究室, Kenkyūshitsu); 133. "Creation" (創造, Sōzō); 134. "Restraint" (拘束, Kōsoku); 135. "On the Run" (逃走中, Tōsōchū); 136. "Right Time" (頃合い, Koroai); 137. "Latest Model" (最新型, Saishingata)
15	November 18, 2021	978-4-09-850731-3
138. "To the Sea" (海へ, Umi e); 139. "Life" (息の根, Ikinone); 140. "In One Go" (一息に, Hitoiki ni); 141. "Choice of Life" (命の選択, Inochi no Sentaku); 142. "Talking to Myself" (独り言, Hitorigoto); 143. "Power of an Organization" (組織の力, Soshiki no Chikara); 144. "Path" (道筋, Michisuji); 145. "Flying Through the Sky" (空を駆ける, Sora o Kakeru); 146. "To Me" (余の下へ, Yo no Moto e); 147. "The Flies That Swarm to the Lion" (獅子にたかる蝿, Shishi ni Takaru Hae)
16	February 18, 2022	978-4-09-850870-9
148. "Scattered" (散り散りに, Chirijiri ni); 149. "Field Marshal Larini" (ラリーニ元帥, Rarīni Gensui); 150. "Arietteians" (アリエット人, Arietto-jin); 151. "Flower Picking" (お花摘み, Ohanatsumi); 152. "Disappearance" (失踪, Shissō); 153. "Tamayoko" (タマヨコ); 154. "Iron Mask" (鉄の仮面, Tetsu no Kamen); 155. "Thunderstorm" (雷雨, Raiu); 156. "Manipulating the Weather" (天候を操る, Tenkō o Ayatsuru); 157. "To the Summit" (頂へ, Itadaki e)
17	May 18, 2022	978-4-09-851126-6
158. "Arbiters of the End" (終末の裁定者, Shūmatsu no Saiteisha); 159. "Yhu" (おみゃへ, Omyahe); 160. "To Be Judged" (断罪されるべき, Danzai Sarerubeki); 161. "Unsparingly" (頭ごなし, Atamagonashi); 162. "Without Mercy" (容赦せず, Yōsha Sezu); 163. "Gungnir Blast" (天槍の光撃(グングニルブラスト), Gunguniru Burasuto); 164. "Blood Vessels of Light" (光の血脈, Hikari no Ketsumyaku); 165. "Where His Power Lies" (力の在処, Chikara no Arika); 166. "Country-Stealing" (国盗り, Kunitori); 167. "Hand-to-Hand Combat" (肉弾戦, Nikudansen)
18	August 18, 2022	978-4-09-851223-2
168. "To Hell With Them" (くそくらえ, Kusokurae); 169. "Comrade" (戦力(なかま), Nakama); 170. "Knight of the Dusk" (黄昏の騎士, Tasogare no Kishi); 171. "Sunset" (夕陽, Yūhi); 172. "Fool" (あんぽんたん, Anpontan); 173. "Bed of Life" (生命の臥所, Seimei no Fushido); 174. "Who" (何者, Nanimono); 175. "Airplane" (飛行機, Hikōki); 176. "Promised Item" (約束の品, Yakusoku no Shina); 177. "Automatic Translation Machine" (自動翻訳機, Jidō Hon'yakuki)
19	December 16, 2022	978-4-09-851390-1
178. "Full of Thorns" (棘だらけ, Ibara-darake); 179. "Mass Value" (質量数値, Shitsuryō Sūchi); 180. "Light Bugs" (光虫, Kōchū); 181. "Warning" (忠告, Chūkoku); 182. "Lost People" (迷い人, Mayoibito); 183. "Payback" (仕返し, Shikaeshi); 184. "Only" (たかが, Takaga); 185. "Tracks of Blood" (血の轍, Chi no Wadachi); 186. "My Father" (我が父, Waga Chichi); 187. "The End" (終わり, Owari)
20	January 18, 2023	978-4-09-851533-2
188. "In the Palm of Their Hand" (掌の上, Tenohira no Ue); 189. "Uruaga" (ウルアーガ, Uruāga); 190. "Vanished" (消失, Shōshitsu); 191. "Power of Darkness" (闇の力, Yami no Chikara); 192. "Become Lost" (失われる, Ushinawareru); 193. "Cause" (元凶, Genkyō); 194. "Creator" (創造主, Sōzōshu); 195. "Gatekeepers" (門番, Monban); 196. "Onward" (先へ, Saki e); 197. "Everyone" (全員, Zen'in)
21	February 16, 2023	978-4-09-851644-5
198. "Intruder" (侵入者, Shin'nyūsha); 199. "Two Attacks" (二撃, Nigeki); 200. "Nest Close" (寄り添う, Yorisou); 201. "Precious Person" (大切なもの, Taisetsu na Mono); 202. "Primordial Light" (原初の光, Gensho no Hikari); 203. "Priestess of Light" (光の巫女, Hikari no Miko); 204. "Nonsense" (戯言, Tawagoto); 205. "Greatest Military Power" (最高戦力, Saikō Senryoku); 206. "Miscalculation" (計算違い, Keisanchigai); 207. "Journey's Purpose" (旅の目的, Tabi no Mokuteki)
22	March 16, 2023	978-4-09-851776-3
208. "Dummy" (お馬鹿さん, Obaka-san); 209. "First Princess" (第一皇女, Dai'ichi Kōjo); 210. "Goes Underground" (地下へと, Chika e to); 211. "Farewell" (お別れ, Owakare); 212. "Survivor" (生き残り, Ikinokori); 213. "It'll Be Fine" (大丈夫です, Daijōbu Desu); 214. "Give It" (よこせ, Yokose); 215. "Liar" (嘘つき, Usotsuki); 216. "Adjustments for the Future" (未来への精算, Mirai e no Seisan); 217. "You Alone?" (一人か, Hitori ka)
