= Mokke =

Japanese manga series

- First tankōbon volume cover, featuring sisters Mizuki (left) and Shizuru Hibara (right)

もっけ
- Genre: Supernatural
- Manga
- Written by: Takatoshi Kumakura
- Published by: Kodansha
- Imprint: Afternoon KC
- Magazine: Afternoon Season Zōkan; (August 10, 2000 – October 10, 2002); Monthly Afternoon; (January 25, 2003 – May 25, 2009)
- Original run: August 10, 2000 – May 25, 2009
- Volumes: 9
- Anime television series
- Directed by: Masayoshi Nishida
- Produced by: Masao Maruyama
- Written by: Seiko Nagatsu
- Music by: Yoshihiro Ike
- Studio: Madhouse; Tezuka Productions
- Original network: Mētele, Tokyo MX
- Original run: October 3, 2007 – March 16, 2008
- Episodes: 24 + 2 OADs
- icon

Mokke (Japanese: もっけ; lit. 'Unexpected') is a Japanese manga series written and illustrated by Takatoshi Kumakura. It was serialized in Kodansha's seinen manga magazines Afternoon Season Zōkan (2000 to 2002) and Monthly Afternoon (2003 to 2009); its chapters were collected in nine tankōbon volumes. A 24-episode anime television series adaptation, produced by Madhouse and Tezuka Productions, was broadcast from October 2007 to March 2008.

== Plot ==
The series revolves around the Hibara sisters' encounters with Japanese demons and spirits. The older sister, Shizuru, has the ability to see these apparitions, while the younger sister, Mizuki, has a tendency to become possessed by them. They live in the countryside because their parents were unable to deal with their supernatural abilities; their grandfather is an expert in such affairs. Through their encounters with the supernatural, Mizuki and Shizuru learn about both themselves and the world at large.

== Characters ==
Shizuru Hibara (檜原 静流, Hibara Shizuru)
Voiced by: Ayako Kawasumi
Mizuki's older sister who is quiet and gentle. She has the ability to see spirits.
Mizuki Hibara (檜原 瑞生, Hibara Mizuki)
Voiced by: Nana Mizuki
Shizuru's younger sister who is energetic and emotional. She is easily possessed by spirits.
Mike-san (三毛さん)
The Hibara family's pet cat.
Ojii-chan (お爺ちゃん, Ojī-chan)
Voiced by: Katsunosuke Hori
Shizuru and Mizuki's grandfather. A local historian and skilled exorcist.
Obaa-chan (お婆ちゃん, Oba-chan)
Voiced by: Hisako Kyōda
Shizuru and Mizuki's grandmother.
Chitose Hibara (檜原 千歳, Hibara Chitose)
Voiced by: Kotono Mitsuishi
Shizuru and Mizuki's mother.

== Media ==
=== Manga ===
Written and illustrated by Takatoshi Kumakura, Mokke was serialized in Kodansha's seinen manga magazine Afternoon Season Zōkan, a spin-off magazine to Monthly Afternoon, from August 10, 2000, (Note: It debuted in the magazine's fourth issue (Summer issue; cover date September 9, 2000), released on August 10, 2000.) to October 10, 2002, when the magazine ceased its publication. It was then transferred to the main magazine, where it ran from January 25, 2003, (Note: It started in the magazine's March 2003, released on January 25 of the same year.) to May 25, 2009. (Note: It finished in the magazine's July 2009 issue, released on May 25 of the same year.) Kodansha collected its chapters in nine tankōbon volumes, released from June 21, 2002, to July 23, 2009.

==== Volumes ====
No.	Release date	ISBN
1	June 21, 2002	978-4-06-314297-6
2	March 20, 2003	978-4-06-314318-8
3	March 23, 2004	978-4-06-314341-6
4	March 23, 2005	978-4-06-314374-4
5	January 23, 2006	978-4-06-314402-4
6	November 22, 2006	978-4-06-314435-2
7	September 21, 2007	978-4-06-314468-0
8	August 22, 2008	978-4-06-314521-2
9	July 23, 2009	978-4-06-314574-8

=== Anime ===
A 24-episode anime television series adaptation was animated by Madhouse and Tezuka Productions, directed by Masayoshi Nishida, with series composition by Seiko Nagatsu, music composed by Yoshihiro Ike. was broadcast on Mētele, Tokyo MX, and other networks, from October 3, 2007, to March 16, 2008. Avex collected the episodes on nine DVDs, released from January 25 to September 26, 2008; two original DVD animation (OAD) episodes were included with the limited edition of the first DVD and the fifth one, respectively. The opening theme is "Kokoro no Ato" (ココロの跡) by Riyu Kosaka, while the ending theme is "Panorama" (パノラマ) by Mai Hashimoto.

==== Episodes ====
No.	Title	Original release date (Note: Mokke aired on Mētele on Tuesday 26:45, effectively Wednesday at 2:45 a.m. JST.)
1	"Mikoshi"; Transliteration: "Mikoshi" (Japanese: ミコシ)	October 3, 2007
2	"The Wandering Izuna"; Transliteration: "Nagare Izuna" (Japanese: ナガレイズナ)	October 10, 2007
3	"Gift"; Transliteration: "Okuri Mono" (Japanese: オクリモノ)	October 17, 2007
4	"The Laughing Darkness"; Transliteration: "Warai Yami" (Japanese: ワライヤミ)	October 24, 2007
5	"Prayer for Fine Weather"; Transliteration: "Hiyori Mōshi" (Japanese: ヒヨリモウシ)	October 31, 2007
6	"Kesran Pasaran"; Transliteration: "Kesran Pasaran" (Japanese: ケセランパサラン)	November 7, 2007
7	"Jatai"; Transliteration: "Jatai" (Japanese: ジャタイ)	November 14, 2007
8	"Yama-uba"; Transliteration: "Yamauba" (Japanese: ヤマウバ)	November 21, 2007
9	"Enenra"; Transliteration: "En'enra" (Japanese: エンエンラ)	November 28, 2007
10	"Kamaitachi"; Transliteration: "Kamaitachi" (Japanese: カマイタチ)	December 5, 2007
11	"Daimanako"; Transliteration: "Daimanako" (Japanese: ダイマナコ)	December 12, 2007
12	"Majimono"; Transliteration: "Majimono" (Japanese: マジモノ)	December 19, 2007
13	"Mameotoko"; Transliteration: "Mameotoko" (Japanese: マメオトコ)	December 30, 2008
14	"Cherry Blossom Staff"; Transliteration: "Tsuezakura" (Japanese: ツエザクラ)	January 6, 2008
15	"Bagworm"; Transliteration: "Minomushi" (Japanese: ミノムシ)	January 13, 2008
16	"Sorabayashi"; Transliteration: "Sorabayashi" (Japanese: ソラバヤシ)	January 20, 2008
17	"Sudamagaeshi"; Transliteration: "Sudamagaeshi" (Japanese: スダマガエシ)	January 27, 2008
18	"Commotion"; Transliteration: "Batabata" (Japanese: バタバタ)	February 3, 2008
19	"Mekurabe"; Transliteration: "Mekurabe" (Japanese: メクラベ)	February 10, 2008
20	"Thunder Hunting"; Transliteration: "Kaminari Gari" (Japanese: カミナリガリ)	February 17, 2008
21	"Wounded Person"; Transliteration: "Teoi Mono" (Japanese: テオイモノ)	February 24, 2008
22	"Inabayama"; Transliteration: "Inabayama" (Japanese: イナバヤマ)	March 2, 2008
23	"Six-Three"; Transliteration: "Roku San" (Japanese: ロクサン)	March 9, 2008
24	"Vestiges"; Transliteration: "Omokage" (Japanese: オモカゲ)	March 16, 2008
OAD–1	"Passing Wind"; Transliteration: "Toori Kaze" (Japanese: トオリカゼ)	January 25, 2008 (DVD only)
OAD–2	"Mitsua Shigaeru"; Transliteration: "Mitsua Shigaeru" (Japanese: ミツアシガエル)	May 23, 2008 (DVD only)
