= Angel Densetsu =

Japanese manga series

- First tankōbon volume cover, featuring Seiichirō Kitano

エンジェル伝説 (Enjeru Densetsu)
- Genre: Comedy, yankī
- Manga
- Written by: Norihiro Yagi
- Published by: Shueisha
- Imprint: Jump Comics
- Magazine: Monthly Shōnen Jump
- Original run: 1993 – 2000
- Volumes: 15
- Original video animation
- Directed by: Yukio Kaizawa
- Produced by: Takehiko Shimazu
- Written by: Naoyuki Sakai
- Music by: Ryūichi Katsumata; Tsuyoshi Itō
- Studio: Toei Animation
- Released: September 13, 1996 – December 13, 1996
- Runtime: 45 minutes
- Episodes: 2
- icon

Angel Densetsu (Japanese: エンジェル伝説, Hepburn: Enjeru Densetsu; lit. "Legend of Angel") is a Japanese manga series written and illustrated by Norihiro Yagi. It was serialized in Shueisha's shōnen manga magazine Monthly Shōnen Jump from 1993 to 2000, with its chapters collected in tankōbon 15 volumes. A two-episode original video animation (OVA) adaptation, animated by Toei Animation, was released in 1996.

== Plot ==
The series follows Seiichirō Kitano, a kind and naive boy with the heart of an angel, but the sinister looks of a devil. This paired with his horrible luck and awkward social skills causes many misunderstandings, leading people to assume that he is a delinquent and heroin addict, and (unbeknownst to himself) results in a career as the head thug, or "school guardian", at his new school.

== Characters ==
=== Hekikuu High School ===
- Seiichirō Kitano (北野 誠一郎, Kitano Seiichirō) Voiced by: Nobuo Tobita
- Seikichi Kuroda (黒田 清吉, Kuroda Seikichi) Voiced by: Kōji Ishii
- Yūji Takehisa (竹久 優二, Takehisa Yūji) Voiced by: Kyousei Tsukui
- Ryoko Koiso (小磯 良子, Koiso Ryōko) Voiced by: Tomo Sakurai
- Ikuko Hirayama (平山 郁子, Hirayama Ikuko)
- Suda
- Koide
- Takashi Ogisu (荻須 高志, Ogisu Takashi)
- Ikuno Shirataki (白滝 幾奶, Shirataki Ikuno)
- Principal Voiced by: Takaya Hashi
- Shiraishi Voiced by: Hisashi Izumi
- Murakami, the teacher in charge of Ryoko's class and the advisor for the karate club.
- Kishida, a guidance counselor at Hekikuu High.
- Iwata, a guidance counselor at Hekikuu High.

=== Hakuun High School ===
- Takeshi Kojima Voiced by: Kazuhiro Nakata
- Hayami, Hakuun High's number 2.
- Tanabe, the guidance counselor of Hakuun High.

=== Hirin High School ===
- Nakanishi, the boss of Hirin High.
- Katayama
- Shioda, Takehisa's senpai in middle school.

=== Delinquent re-educators ===
They are known as special guidance counselors, but they are actually working for the Education Committee. They are known as the "Shadowy Seven" (and "Shadowy Six" after Shirataki's retirement).

- Irie, the first of the seven guidance counselors, seen in chapter 7.
- Kumagai, the most warrior-like of the seven.
- Shirataki, the third special guidance counselor dispatched from the Education Committee to deal with Kitano.
- Haruka Hishida, first seen in chapter 43.
- The other three members of the seven/six were never introduced during the series.

=== Kitano's Parents ===
- Ryuichiro Kitano (北野 隆一郎, Kitano Ryūichirō), his father, an ordinary office worker, first seen in chapter 21.
- Midori Kitano (北野 みどり, Kitano Midori), his mother, first seen in chapter 21.

=== Ryoko's Parents ===
- Heizo Koiso, Ryoko's father.
- Mrs. Koiso, Ryoko's deceased mother.

=== The Halford Family ===
- Papa Halford, an American with a Japanese wife and two children, who moved to Japan 20 years ago.
- Mama Halford, introduced in chapter 66.
- Leo Halford (レオ·ハルフォード, Reo Harufōdo), the half-Japanese first son of the Halford family.
- Sana Halford (サナ·ハルフォード, Sana Harufodo), Leo's little sister.

=== Others ===
- Kiyomi Kaburagi, president of the Photography Club at a high school near Hekikuu High.
- Kikuchi, a member of the Photography Club.
- Yamazaki, a member of the Photography Club
- Noguchi, a member of the Photography Club
- Chuji Asai, Midori's cousin, only seen 18 years ago in chapters 76 to 78.

== Media ==
=== Manga ===
Written and illustrated by Norihiro Yagi, Angel Densetsu was serialized in Shueisha's shōnen manga magazine Monthly Shōnen Jump from 1993 to 2000. Its chapters were collected in 15 tankōbon volumes, released from August 4, 1993, to April 4, 2000.

==== Volumes ====
No.	Release date	ISBN
01	August 4, 1993	4-08-871105-X
02	February 4, 1994	4-08-871107-6
03	August 4, 1994	4-08-871145-9
04	January 11, 1995	4-08-871146-7
05	July 4, 1995	4-08-871147-5
06	December 1, 1995	4-08-871148-3
07	March 4, 1996	4-08-871149-1
08	August 2, 1996	4-08-871150-5
09	February 4, 1997	4-08-872339-2
10	August 4, 1997	4-08-872360-0
11	February 4, 1998	4-08-872522-0
12	August 4, 1998	4-08-872596-4
13	February 4, 1999	4-08-872676-6
14	August 4, 1999	4-08-872753-3
15	April 4, 2000	4-08-872857-2

=== Original video animation ===
A two-episode original video animation (OVA), animated by Toei Animation, was released on September 13 and December 13, 1996.

== Reception ==
On Anime News Network, Justin Sevakis calls the OVA "easily one of my top 10 anime comedies of all time."
