= Riyu Kosaka =

Japanese pop singer and lyricist

- Also known as: Miki Roberts
- Born: Riyu Kosaka; January 17, 1985 (age 41); Yokohama, Kanagawa, Japan
- Genres: Japanese pop; Rock; Trance; Eurobeat; Techno
- Occupations: Singer; lyricist
- Years active: 2000–present
- Labels: Konami; avex; Toshiba-EMI; 5pb.
- Website: Official website

Riyu Kosaka (小坂 りゆ（小坂 梨由）, Kosaka Riyu; born January 17, 1985) is a Japanese pop singer and lyricist. She is best known as a member of the Konami-produced Japanese teen pop girl group BeForU.

== Biography ==
=== Early life ===
Kosaka was born in Yokohama, Kanagawa Prefecture, Japan on January 17, 1985.

=== Discovery by Konami ===
On November 20, 2000, Konami and Toshiba-EMI staff held auditions to form a J-pop group, which would eventually become BeForU; Riyu, who was then fifteen years old, was one of four who went on to join the group. The group, produced by Naoki Maeda, originally made songs specifically for Bemani games—their first song, Dive, was promoted intensely in the time leading up to the release of Dance Dance Revolution 5thMix.

=== True... ===
After Dive's success in 5thMix, BeForU produced more tracks for inclusion in DDRMAX Dance Dance Revolution 6thMix, including Dive: More Deep and Deeper Style and Firefly. This is where Kosaka got her first solo track, True.... Two different versions were included in the game, True... (radio edit) and True...: Trance Sunrise Mix. For the first time for any member of BeForU, a CD single was released. including a long version of both the radio edit and the trance sunrise mix, as well as a remix of a solo performance of Dive, renamed Dive to the Night. True... was a success in the DDR community, and Kosaka continued to release other songs for use in Bemani both with BeForU and as a solo singer.

=== Breaking out from Bemani ===
While they continued to make music for Konami, BeForU began to put more emphasis on themselves as legitimate musicians, and this included Kosaka. In 2004, the band's first CD was released, containing some solo work by Kosaka; in the same year, her first full solo album, Begin, was released. Begin contained three original songs, as well as eleven re-recorded Bemani songs, some of which were covers of other artists. A year later, she released Riyu Kosaka First Live at O-EAST 2005, a CD+DVD set of her first full-blown concert. (This cannot actually be considered her first live performance, as she did limited performances to promote her single True.... ) Since that time, Kosaka has released a number of singles both on her own and with BeForU, as well as a new album with BeForU.

In 2005 and 2006, she also collaborated with Ryo Horikawa as a radio personality for Pakedio Channel, and her song Little Wings is available on the album Pakedio Channel Vol. 1.

In 2007, Riyu Kosaka recorded a song for the film Kamen Rider The Next, Platinum Smile. The song is an insert song for the movie with Kosaka providing the singing voice for Erika Mori, who portrays Chiharu Kazami, the younger sister of Shiro Kazami/Kamen Rider V3. In December 2007, Riyu released her sixth single, Kokoro no ato. The song was used as the introduction song in the anime Mokke.

In 2008, Riyu released her second studio album, Every Struggle, which was also her debut album on a major record label. The album contained her four most recent singles at the time and 7 new tracks, for a total of 11 tracks overall. Due to the break-up of BeForU in late 2008, Riyu did not produce any solo works for some time.

In 2010, Riyu announced the release of her song 'キミが聞こえる' which would be featured on 'あまつみそらに!' as the ending theme and was also released as part of the soundtrack in June 2010. This release, however, was not on avex trax but on 5pb. which may indicate she has switched labels. Kosaka will also be performing at the 'Live5pb.2010' concert.

In 2018, she provided vocals on the Dynamite Dynamite Rev -NAOKI SPECIAL ALBUM-. In 2019, she provided vocals for the opening song of the mobile game Seven's Code.

In 2021, the song 12 by Naoki and Riyu Kosaka that was in Seven's Code reappears on the game StepManiaX.

== Discography ==
This is a discography of Kosaka's solo work. For her complete discography, see the BeForU discography.

=== Singles ===
- True... (2001)
- Yamato Nadeshiko (2006) (Yamato Nadeshiko Spirit or Perfect Japanese Woman Spirit)
- Danzai no Hana: Guilty Sky (2007) (Danzai no Hana or Flower of Conviction, for the anime Claymore)
- Dober Man (2007)
- Platinum Smile (2007)
- Kokoro no ato (2007) (Kokoro no Ato or Traces of heart, for the anime Mokke)
- Saisho no Melody (2011) (First Melody or Beginning Melody, Ending theme for the PSP Game Hakugin no Karu to Soku no Jo'ou.

=== Albums ===
- Begin (2004)
- Every Struggle (2008)

=== Other CDs ===
- Baby's Tears (2006) (as part of the Sky Girls Original Soundtrack)
- I-revoミュージックICE限定配信曲 (2006) (available for download only from BeForU's i-revo homepage, this digital album is referred to by fans as Little Wings or Startup.)
- Platinum Smile (2007) as featured on the Kamen Rider the Next original soundtrack)
- あまつみそらに! Soundtracks (2010) Riyu provides vocals for the ending theme 'キミが聞こえる.'

=== DVDs ===
- Riyu Kosaka First Live at O-EAST 2005 (2005)
- Riyu's Summer Vacation (2007)
- BeForU / Four Piece Riyu Kosaka / Live 2008 (2008)

=== Video games ===
Riyu Kosaka has a total of seven songs and two remixes in the Dance Dance Revolution series.

Song	Arcade game							
Song	MAX	MAX2	Ex	SN	SN2	X	X2	Other
"true… (radio edit)"	Yes	Yes	Yes	Yes	Yes	Yes		
"true… (trance sunrise mix)"	Yes	Yes	Yes	Yes	Yes	Yes		
"Candy♥"		Yes	Yes	Yes	Yes		Unlockable	Yes
"Dive to the Night"		Yes	Yes	Yes	Yes	Yes	Yes	Yes
"Love♥Shine"			Yes	Yes	Yes		Unlockable	Yes
"Baby's Tears"				Yes	Yes			
"Baby's Tears (Sky Girls Opening Theme)"					Yes			
"Himawari"				Yes	Yes		Unlockable	Yes
"Honey♂Punch"				Yes	Yes			
"Other" includes Dance Dance Revolution X3 vs. 2ndMix and newer.

Additionally, Riyu Kosaka has a total of seven songs that appear in StepManiaX. With the exception of "VTubers Never Die! (RE-incarnation MIX)", these originally appeared in Seven's Code and Chrono Circle. Songs available in StepManiaX include:

- "Twelve -True Fix-" by Riyu Kosaka (January 29, 2021)
- "The Judgement Day" by Naoki featuring Riyu Kosaka (March 29, 2021)
- "Paradox (StepManiaX Mix)" by Naoki featuring Riyu Kosaka (June 28, 2021)
- "VTubers Never Die! (RE-incarnation MIX)" by Naoki & Eternal JK Yoripi-chan featuring Riyu Kosaka (July 25, 2022)
