= List of Claymore characters =

Claymore, a manga series by Norihiro Yagi, is set in a medieval world plagued by Yoma, humanoid shape-shifters that feed on humans. A mysterious group, known as the Organization, creates human-Yoma hybrids to exterminate Yoma for a fee. The public refer to these warriors as "Claymores," alluding to their large swords, or "Silver-eyed Witches," due to their silver eyes.

== Main characters ==
Clare (クレア, Kurea) Voiced by: Houko Kuwashima (Japanese); Stephanie Young, Cherami Leigh (Child) (English)
Clare is the series' protagonist. As a child, Clare's parents are killed by a Yoma disguised as Clare's brother; he and his pack force her to travel with them to deceive other victims Teresa destroys the pack in Teo village and inadvertently frees Clare. As Clare is an outcast, Teresa assumes responsibility for her. Condemned to death for desertion, Teresa decides to live for Clare. As a result, the Organization sends an execution team. Though Teresa defeats the team, an awakened Priscilla kills Teresa. Clare is converted into a Claymore and trains for years to attain the power necessary to kill Priscilla. As she is considered weak due to her Yoma abilities coming not from Yoma flesh but from the remains of Teresa, Clare is No. 47 - the lowest possible rank.
Teresa (テレサ, Teresa) Voiced by: Romi Park (Japanese); Christine Auten (English)
Teresa of the Faint Smile is so named as she has no apparent technique or personality trait — only her faint smile. Though she can sense Yoki flow in her opponents, she defeats Priscilla despite Priscilla's ability to hide her Yoki. Teresa is never seen using more than 10% Yoki in battle, yet consistently defeats more powerful opponents and holds the highest possible rank - No. 1. She adopts Clare, but is later killed by Priscilla. Clare takes Teresa's severed head and demands the Organization to use it in place of a Yoma to turn her into a Claymore.
Priscilla (プリシラ, Purishira) Voiced by: Aya Hisakawa (Japanese); Brina Palencia (English)
Priscilla is the main adversary of Clare. Priscilla is powerful enough to fight without Yoki, concealing her presence from sister warriors. Priscilla is assigned to lead an execution team against Teresa. Teresa defeats the team, despite Priscilla's Yoki concealment. In desperation, Priscilla begins releasing her Yoki and eventually kills Teresa. Priscilla fully awakens into a winged, one-horned demonic humanoid. She destroys the execution team, but ignores Clare. Priscilla flies to parts unknown. Eventually, Priscilla meets and defeats Isley and Rigaldo. Then she reverts to human form and regresses into childhood, losing her memory. Isley swears allegiance to Priscilla and promises to take Priscilla south. Later, she becomes attached to Raki, due to the scent of Teresa he carries, via his past exposure to Clare. Near the end of the anime, she regains her memories and battles Clare, believing her to be Teresa. Clare manages to defeat her, but before she can strike the killing blow, Raki protects Priscilla, telling Clare that she must not give into her desire for revenge as it would make her no better than a Yoma. Her life is spared, and Isley arrives to take her away with him as she again regressed to her childlike persona.
Miria (ミリア, Miria) Voiced by: Kikuko Inoue (Japanese); Monica Rial (English)
Miria plays the consummate leader in series. Her agility-based technique leaves afterimages, confusing opponents, earning her the nickname "Phantom" Miria. Miria secretly investigates the Organization after the death of a friend, Hilda, the target of an Awakened Hunt. At the end of the anime, she decides to leave the Organization, having grown disillusioned with its corruption and deception.
Deneve (デネヴ, Denevu) Voiced by: Hana Takeda (Japanese); Caitlin Glass (English)
Deneve is a Northern Campaign survivor that displays high regenerative ability. Deneve forms a close friendship with Helen early on, and after the Paburo Hunt, Deneve bonds with Miria and Clare. Deneve reveals that, as a young girl, a Yoma killed her family. She wishes to avenge her family, but as she has a strong will to live, she ends up becoming a Defensive Type instead. Ashamed of what she regards as her cowardice, she fights suicidally until she meets Helen, who convinces her that her thoughts are natural, as "We're only human, after all."
Helen (ヘレン, Heren) Voiced by: Miki Nagasawa (Japanese); Jamie Marchi (English)
Helen, the fourth member of the Paburo Hunt, can stretch her arms to extreme lengths to attack at range or bind her opponents. Helen likes to eat and drink. She is hot tempered and aggressive, and status conscious, initially disliking Clare for her low rank. Like Deneve, Miria, and Clare, Helen is partially awakened. After surviving the Northern Campaign, she combines Flexible Limb Stretching with Jean's Drill Sword technique.

== Supporting characters ==
=== Awakened Beings ===
Awakened Beings (覚醒者 Kakusei-sha) are Claymore warriors that have fully awakened. They possess abilities similar to Yoma, only of much greater magnitude. Awakened Beings can take on myriad of forms—a bird (Hilda in anime), crustacean (Agatha), humanoid (Dauf), or mammal (Isley and Rigaldo). In Organization history, there are three cases of a No. 1 warrior awakening. Known as "Creatures of the Abyss" (深淵の者 Shin'en no mono), they settle in different regions of the island—one in the West (Lautrec), one in the North (Alfons), and one in the South (Mucha). This status quo did not change until Isley, the "Silver King" of the North, began to raise an army of Awakened and expand his influence into the others' regions.

Abyss Feeders
The original Abyss Feeders (深淵喰い Shin'en gui) are 11 warriors created from the 11 Awakened Beings that attacked the Organization Headquarters after the Northern Campaign. Abyss Feeders are trained to hunt Creatures of the Abyss. Their eyes and mouths have been sewn shut, the ability to sense and radiate Yoki has been removed and they track their target by scent alone. They are trained to return home if six or more Feeders are killed. After killing Isley, they are used to track down Riful for Alicia and Beth.
Agatha (アガサ, Agasa)
Hiding in Robona, Agatha's presence is detected by Galatea, who is also in hiding. Galatea releases her Yoki, baiting the Organization to send an execution team—Clarice and Miata. They find and attack Galatea, resulting in a 3-way fight among the team, Galatea and Agatha. Later, she fights in a mummy-like body, but is defeated by the survivors of the Northern Campaign.
Alicia (アリシア, Arishia) and Beth (ベス, Besu)
Identical twin sisters, they are part of the Organization's program to develop controlled Awakened Beings. The first experiment, using non-identical sisters Luciela and Rafaela, ends in failure. Due to training from infancy, Alicia and Beth are of one mind—a two-body Claymore warrior in effect. One sister fully awakens, while the other sister retains the Twins' collective human mind and remote controls the awakened partner. The Twins are defeated and killed by Priscilla.
Dauf (ダフ, Dafu) Voiced by: Kenji Hamada (Japanese); Christopher Ayres (English)
Consort of Riful of the West. Awakened, Dauf appears as a giant armored humanoid. He forms rods from his hands, arm and mouth, firing them as projectiles. But for all his physical power, Dauf displays low intelligence and poor tactics. His regeneration and healing abilities are also low. Devoted to Riful, he fears her deserting him.
Isley (イースレイ, Īsurei) Voiced by: Koji Yusa (Japanese); John Swasey (English)
Isley is the Creature of the Abyss of the North. His awakened form resembles a centaur, whose arms can shape-shift into a lance and shield, crossbow, and sword. When Priscilla defeats him, he swears allegiance to her. In order to conceal Priscilla's true power, Isley claims that he won and that she is simply his consort. To keep his promise to take Priscilla south, Isley gathers the Northern Army. He also comes into contact with Raki, giving the young man valuable tutelage in swordsmanship. Despite being a powerful Awakened Being, he possesses a genteel manner and shows great respect towards even those who are opposed to him.
Luciela (ルシエラ, Rushiera)
No. 1 of Luciela era. She and Rafaela are the Organization's first attempt at creating a controlled Awakened Being. The experiment fails due to use of non-identical sisters. Luciela's awakened form is cat-like. Luciela loses fight with Isley over control of southern region of Mucha. Rafaela finds Luciela and kills her by breaking her spine. However, Rafaela injects her Yoki into Luciela and they successfully merged.
Ophelia (オフィーリア, Ofīria) Voiced by: Emi Shinohara (Japanese); Luci Christian (English)
Ophelia is as powerful as she is unstable. As a child, her family was killed by Priscilla, with her brother sacrificing his life to ensure that she escaped safely. As a result of this childhood trauma, she displays sociopathic behavior, even going so far as to fight her fellow Claymores. She despises Awakened Beings because of her family's death, and she relishes any opportunity to hunt them out of revenge. Ophelia's technique is Rippling Sword, where her super-flexible arm undulates the blade, creating a snake-like illusion. She styles herself "Rippling Ophelia." She tries to kill Clare, but Ilena interrupts Clare's execution. Ophelia is defeated and badly injured. Pushed to the brink of insanity by her defeat and her past trauma, Ophelia awakens into a serpentine form; despite her transformation, she believes that she is still in control of her mind and body (the only oddity she notes is a newfound appetite for entrails). She tracks down Clare and they do battle in a lake. After seeing her reflection in the water, Ophelia allows Clare to kill her. As she dies, she has a vision of her brother, believing that she will reunite with him in the afterlife.
Riful (リフル, Rifuru) Voiced by: Nana Mizuki (Japanese); Brittney Karbowski and Cynthia Cranz (English)
Riful is the Creature of the Abyss in the West. Riful is both the youngest No. 1 and the youngest Creature of the Abyss. Riful's awakened form resembles a mermaid-octopus, composed of fleshy layers that can riffle apart. She lives with her consort, Dauf, in abandoned castles in Lautrec. To counter Isley of the North, Riful attempts to build an army of awakened Claymores.
Rigaldo (リガルド, Rigarudo) Voiced by: Hiro Yuuki (Japanese); Vic Mignogna (English)
Isley's second-in-command. Rigaldo appears composed, but angers easily when provoked. Rigaldo's lion form is smaller than most Awakened Beings, but he compensates with greater speed and agility. For long-range and surprise attacks, Rigaldo can extend his claws at high speed. In contrast to his high offensive power, Rigaldo is lacking in regenerative ability. While not friends with Isley, Rigaldo works for him, having been defeated by Isley earlier. In VIZ English translation, Isley nicknames Rigaldo as the "Silver-eyed Lion." He is killed by a nearly-awakened Clare; before dying, he expresses amazement at Clare's skill and power.

=== Claymores ===
Anastasia (アナスタシア, Anasutashia)
Anastasia is known for her ability to "float" midair on strands of hair. She and her comrades join the rebels in overthrowing the Organization. Her leadership proves critical in destroying a lab where Awakened Beings are made.
Audrey (オードリー, Ōdorī)
No. 3 of the next generation. She displays a polite demeanor, in contrast to Rachel's. Audrey uses her sword to deflect her opponent's attack without opposing it with force. Riful calls this technique a "Gentle Sword."
Clarice (クラリス, Kurarisu)
No. 47 of the next generation. An incomplete hybrid, she retains her original hair color and is susceptible to cold. Also a member of a failed Awakened Hunt led by Nina, she was rescued by survivors of the Northern Campaign. Clarice is assigned to lead an execution team for Galatea. Clarice and Miata find and attack Galatea in Rabona, only to meet an awakened Agatha. After defeat in a 3-way fight, the three warriors and city are saved by survivors of the Northern Campaign. Clarice and Miata later stay in Rabona under the supervision of Galatea.
Cynthia (シンシア, Shinshia) Voiced by: Miho Miyagawa (Japanese); Anastasia Muñoz (English)
Cynthia, a member of Team Veronica, is one of seven survivors of the Northern Campaign. Cynthia helps fight the Insectile Awakened Being during the first battle. Her personality appears cheerful and caring. She accompanies Clare to find Raki in Lautrec. Cynthia displays mental acuity when she guesses that Rubel is an enemy agent working against the Organization. After the 7-year Timeskip, Cynthia's regeneration skill have advanced to the point where she regenerates Uma's missing leg.
Dietrich (ディートリヒ, Dītorihi)
Dietrich first appears leading an Awakened Hunt into disaster. But Deneve and Helen save the warriors. Dietrich uses a technique, which she jumps skyhigh, then lands a blow on the target, bisecting it. Dietrich joins the rebels in seeking the truth about the Organization.
Flora (フローラ, Furōra) Voiced by: Miyu Matsuki (Japanese); Trina Nishimura (English)
Flora's sword drawing technique is one of the fastest of any warrior. Diplomatic personality, even when imposing discipline on Pieta Task Force. After the battle, Flora tests Clare in a sword-match. Afterward, Flora determines her Windcutter is slower, but more precise, while Clare's Quick Sword is faster. Flora says she is no longer "the fastest of warriors." Rigaldo bisects Flora with a claw. During the 7-year Timeskip, Clare invents a Yoki-less Windcutter. She uses it against a surprised Agatha, who cannot detect Clare's Yoki.
Galatea (ガラテア, Garatea) Voiced by: Ai Orikasa (Japanese); Colleen Clinkenbeard (English)
Galatea acts as "Eye" of the Organization. Well-mannered, aristocratic bearing. One of the kinder Claymore warriors. She can sense Yoki, read thoughts and emotions of other warriors from long distances. She can also control Yoki flow in Awakened Beings, misdirecting their attacks. She is sent on a mission to retrieve Clare. After fighting alongside Clare and Jean, Galatea reports them dead. Galatea deserts the Organization after the Northern Campaign. Swearing never to wield her sword again, she takes religious vows and becomes Sister Latea, a nun in Rabona, caring for orphans at a neighborhood church.
Hilda (ヒルダ, Hiruda) Voiced by: Komina Matsushita (Japanese); Colleen Clinkenbeard (English)
Hilda acts as Miria's mentor during Miria's first Awakened Hunt. Miria (then No. 17) and Hilda vow to work together again as single-digit warriors. Behind the scenes, Hilda begins to awaken. She gives her Black Card to Ophelia, who, instead of giving it to Miria, destroys it. Ophelia leads an unaware Miria on a hunt in the mountains. The giant, mummy-like Hilda scarcely resists Miria's fatal attack, possibly keeping the vow Hilda made earlier. As Hilda dies reverting to human form, a horrified Miria nearly awakens herself. Years later, Helen stumbles across Hilda's sword, which had been lost during her awakening. Miria stakes the sword as Hilda's gravemark on the mountain.
Ilena (イレーネ, Irēne) Voiced by: Minami Takayama (Japanese); Wendy Powell (English)
Ilena can fully awaken her sword-arm, yet control it in making near-unpredictable attacks. Ilena, along with Sophia and Noel, are assigned to an execution team led by Priscilla. The team fails to kill Teresa, who is beheaded by an awakening Priscilla. Sophia and Noel are killed. Ilena loses her left arm, who later goes into hiding. Years later, Ilena comes upon Ophelia, who is about to kill Clare. Ilena defeats Ophelia's Rippling Sword, wounding Ophelia in the process. Ilena brings Clare to a cabin hidden in a mountain valley, where Clare recovers. After failing to teach Clare the Quick-sword, Ilena cuts off her remaining arm and orders Clare to attach it. But after Clare leaves the valley, Rafaela shows up and presumably executes Ilena for desertion.
Jean (ジーン, Jīn) Voiced by: Kotono Mitsuishi (Japanese); Laura Bailey (English)
Jean's technique is based on twisting the sword arm, her free hand holding then releasing it in one burst. Galatea says "Among all the warriors, you have the fastest, strongest thrust." Jean and hunt members, Katea and Raquel, are captured by Dauf and Riful. Raquel and Katea are killed. After prolonged torture, Jean awakens into a butterfly-like form. Clare, repeating Galatea's technique, is able to revert Jean to her human self. As a result, Jean believes she has a debt to pay Clare, much to Clare's dismay. After an awakened Clare kills Rigaldo, she pleads with Helen to kill her. Jean, mortally wounded, uses the last of her strength to revert Clare to normal." In the anime, this occurs after Clare's battle with Priscilla.
Miata (ミアータ, Miāta)
A pre-teen, Miata has an unstable mind, which if controlled, would enable Miata to be No. 1. Miata is paired with Clarice, who acts as a surrogate mother, breastfeeding Miata from time to time. Due to her heightened five senses, Miata is assigned to track down and execute Galatea. Miata and Clarice eventually find Galatea in Rabona, which is attacked by the awakened Agatha. Galatea released Yoki, baiting the Organization to send potential allies to Rabona. Miata and Clarice desert the Organization and stay in Rabona.
Nina (ニーナ, Nīna)
Next generation's No. 9. She is cold and harsh, skilled in tactics, but a poor strategist. Nina calls her technique "Shadow Chaser," as she shadows the target's Yoki and attacks, her sword not stopping until target is killed. She leads an Awakened Hunt, which includes Clarice. The hunt is overpowered by three Awakened Beings, but the warriors are rescued by survivors of the Northern Campaign.
Noel (ノエル, Noeru)
"Storm Wind" Noel is No. 4 and 5 of the Teresa era. She has a rivalry with Sophia, as they argue about who is No. 3 and 4, only to later discover both have been demoted due to Priscilla's promotion as the new No. 2. Sophia and Noel join an execution team to find and kill Teresa. Later, an awakening Priscilla beheads Teresa. Ilena, Noel and Sophia attack Priscilla, who wounds Ilena, then kills Sophia and Noel with extendable claws.
Rachel (レイチェル, Reicheru)
Rachel's personality is the opposite of Audrey's demure manner. Rachel appears hot-tempered and confrontational. Rachel stores force in her sword blade, which she releases like a leaf spring. Riful calls this technique "Strong Sword." Despite repeated attacks and stepped-up efforts, the technique proves ineffectual against Riful. Miria and her comrades rescue Audrey and Rachel. Rachel dislikes Miria. But due to Rachel's friendship with Audrey, Rachel joins the Claymore mutiny.
Rafaela (ラファエラ, Rafaera) Voiced by: Satsuki Yukino (Japanese); Kate Oxley (English)
Rafaela and her elder sister Luciela are the Organization's first attempt at Mind Share and controlled awakening. But Luciela fully awakens and nearly destroys the Organization. Rafaela is decommissioned and exiled. Years later, after the loss of warriors No. 1 through 5, Rubel persuades Rafaela to rejoin the Organization as No. 5. Rafaela acts as an enforcer. She presumably executes Ilena for desertion and tracks down Clare and Jean. After Luciela is defeated by Isley, Rafaela finds and kills Luciela, fusing her body with her sister's. The merged bodies are found by Riful, who brings them back to her castle in Lautrec.
Renée (ルネ, Rune)
No. 6 of the next generation. She serves as "Eye" of the Organization. She first appears outside of Doga village. Renée questions Raki on how he identified a Yoma. But Priscilla frightens her away. After leaving the town, Renée is captured by Riful. In an abandoned castle, Riful tries to persuade Renée to awaken the merged Luciela-Rafaela, which Renée does.
Sophia (ソフィア, Sofia)
No. 3 and 4 of Teresa's era. She has a rivalry with Noel, as they argue about who is No. 3 and 4, only to later discover both have been demoted due to Priscilla's promotion as the new No. 2. Sophia and Noel join an execution team to find and kill Teresa. Later, an awakening Priscilla beheads Teresa. Ilena, Noel and Sophia attack Priscilla, who wounds Ilena, then kills Sophia and Noel with extendable claws.
Tabitha (タバサ, Tabasa) Voiced by: Akeno Watanabe (Japanese); Leslie Patrick and Michele Specht (English)
Tabitha is assigned to Team Miria during Northern Campaign. Tabitha, like Galatea, specializes in sensing Yoki, fulfilling the role of the "Eye" for the survivors.
Uma (ユマ, Uma) Voiced by: (Japanese); Cherami Leigh (English)
Uma is assigned to Team Miria during Northern Campaign. She is one of the seven survivors. After training during 7-year Timeskip, Uma still feels insecure and weak compared to her comrades. Later in Lacroix village, she finds that she can easily dispatch higher ranking Claymore warriors. She can throw her sword accurately over long distances.
Undine (ウンディーネ, Undīne) Voiced by: Rie Ishizuka (Japanese); Clarine Harp (English)
Undine leads Team Undine during Northern Campaign. Undine is noted for her confrontational personality. Her large muscles are due to slowly releasing Yoki. She uses two swords, the second from a fallen friend. Later, Deneve discovers an Undine shrunk to her true, slender form. Deneves guesses that reason for Undine's temporary muscles was getting permission from the Organization to carry two swords. During the second battle, Undine is killed by Rigaldo. Before the warriors' last stand, Deneve takes up Undine's own sword.
Veronica (ベロニカ, Veronika) Voiced by: Akeno Watanabe (Japanese); Michele Specht (English)
Assigned during Northern Campaign to lead Team Veronica. During first battle, Insectile Awakened decimates Team Jean, Jean left standing alone. Team Veronica reinforces Team Jean. Veronica and Cynthia act as decoys, while Jean kills Insectile. During second battle, Rigaldo kills Veronica.

=== The Organization ===
The Organization is headquartered in the eastern region of Sutafu. Rimuto is the leader. Field operatives, dressed in black, act as case officers/handlers for Claymore warriors.

Miria speculates that the island is a testing ground for creating Awakened Beings. She says that a greater continent exists beyond the island, where war rages between two sides. One side is allied with the Dragons' Descendents, the other is the parent power behind the Organization.

- Dae (ダーエ, Dāe) is chief scientist of the Retrieval Squad, responsible for creating Yoma-type entities. Left half his face is missing, exposing his eyeball and teeth. He uses the arm of Priscilla to resurrect Cassandra, Roxanne and Hysteria.
- Ermitage (エルミタ, Erumita) is the handler of Galatea and Miria. Ermita compares himself to a parent watching over his child, but also says he would never father a monster. He is voiced by Chō.
- Orsay (オルセ, Oruse)Voiced by: Hōchū Ōtsuka (Japanese); David Trosko (English)

Teresa's handler. He is voiced by Hōchū Ōtsuka.

- Rado (ラド) is Clarice's handler and the one to tell her to take care of Miata.
- Rimuto (リムト) heads the Executive committee.
- Rubel (ルヴル, Ruburu) Voiced by: Hiroaki Hirata (Japanese); R. Bruce Elliott (English)

Clare's handler. Later, Cynthia guesses that he is an enemy agent, working to destroy the Organization from within. While he gives information to Miria, he hides the existence of half-awakened Claymores, further stalling research on controlled awakening.

=== Humans ===
Raki (ラキ, Raki) Voiced by: Motoki Takagi (Japanese); Todd Haberkorn (English)
Raki first appears in series as young boy in Doga village. A Yoma disguised as an older brother, Zaki, kills Raki's family. The village chief hires Clare to find and kill the Yoma. Clare adopts Raki when he is exiled from Doga. After fleeing Ophelia in Gonahl, Clare and Raki split up, Clare promising to rejoin Raki. Later in Alfons, Raki escapes from a slave prison. Raki meets Priscilla and Isley. Isley becomes Raki's mentor. When Clare finds Raki's former prison, she and her comrades leave Alfons. He reappears in Doga as an adult, travelling with a regressed, childlike Priscilla. By now an experienced swordsman, he is shown to wear his own armor. Later in Ticelli village, Raki is struck by parasitic rods. Priscilla buries her arm into his shoulder, preventing the rods from killing Raki, but abandons him shortly thereafter Later, the Retrieval Squad captures Raki and brings him to Organization Headquarters.
Father Vincent (ヴィンセント司祭, Vuinsento shisai) Voiced by: Masaaki Yajima (Japanese); Chuck Huber (English)
Father Vincent is a priest in charge of Rabona cathedral. A bald, middle-aged man, he is dressed in religious vestments and wears a gold chain with a cross around his neck. A Yoma is killing staff members in the cathedral. Vincent asks the Organization for help. Owing to Rabona's ban on Claymores, Clare and Raki arrive in the city posing as siblings. During a meeting with Vincent, Clare gets his promise to take care of Raki should she die. Later, when Clare is injured, Vincent tends Clare's wounds, but is shocked by the Yoma scar on her abdomen.
Galk (ガーク, Gāku) Voiced by: Kazuma Horie (Japanese); Christopher Sabat (English)
Galk is a leader in the Rabona guards, and friend of Sid. He is the older and wiser of the two. A tall muscular man with short hair, he usually wears a suit of armor. He warmed up to Clare much sooner than Sid did, respecting her resolve as a warrior.
Sid (シド, Shido) Voiced by: Hiroyuki Yoshino (Japanese); Eric Vale (English)
Sid is a guard of the Holy City of Rabona, and friend of Galk. Initially, he appears brash, short-tempered and hostile toward Claymore warriors. He is skilled at knife throwing. Despite his initial dislike of Claymores, he comes to respect and admire Clare for her prowess as a warrior.
