= Claymore (manga) =

Japanese manga by Norihiro Yagi and its adaptations

- First tankōbon volume cover, featuring Clare
- Genre: Adventure; Dark fantasy; Sword and sorcery
- Manga
- Written by: Norihiro Yagi
- Published by: Shueisha
- English publisher: AUS: Madman Entertainment; NA: Viz Media
- Imprint: Jump Comics
- Magazine: Monthly Shōnen Jump; (June 6, 2001 – June 6, 2007); Jump Square; (November 2, 2007 – October 4, 2014)
- Original run: June 6, 2001 – October 4, 2014
- Volumes: 27
- Anime television series
- Directed by: Hiroyuki Tanaka
- Produced by: Manabu Tamura; Masao Maruyama; Toshio Nakatani
- Written by: Yasuko Kobayashi
- Music by: Masanori Takumi
- Studio: Madhouse (Note: Animation production assistance (アニメーション制作協力) for all episodes provided by DR Movie.)
- Licensed by: Crunchyroll: UK: Manga Entertainment; (DVD); Anime Limited; (Blu-ray)
- Original network: Nippon TV
- English network: US: Funimation Channel
- Original run: April 4, 2007 – September 26, 2007
- Episodes: 26
- Video game

Claymore: Gingan no Majo
- Developer: Digital Works Entertainment
- Genre: Action
- Platform: Nintendo DS
- Released: May 28, 2009
- icon

Claymore (stylized in all caps) is a Japanese manga series written and illustrated by Norihiro Yagi. It debuted in Shueisha's shōnen manga magazine Monthly Shōnen Jump in June 2001, where it continued until the magazine was shut down in June 2007. The series was transferred to the newly launched Jump Square, serialized from November 2007 to October 2014. Its chapters were collected in 27 tankōbon volumes.

A 26-episode anime television series adaptation by Madhouse was broadcast on Nippon Television from April to September 2007. A CD soundtrack for the anime and a CD of character songs using its voice actresses were released in July and September 2007, respectively.

The Claymore manga was licensed for English release in North America by Viz Media and released its 27 volumes from April 2006 to October 2015. The anime adaptation was licensed for release in North America by Funimation. Madman Entertainment has licensed the anime for release in Australia and New Zealand and the anime is sub-licensed by Manga Entertainment for UK distribution.

== Plot ==
=== Setting ===
The series is set on a fictional medieval island where humans are plagued by Yoma (妖魔), humanoid shape-shifters that feed on humans. A mysterious group, known as The Organization, creates human-Yoma hybrids to kill Yoma for a fee. These female warriors wear armored uniforms. The public refer to them as "Claymores", alluding to their claymore swords,^{[ch. 3]} or "Silver-eyed Witches", due to their silver eyes.^{[ch. 1]}

Yoma and Claymore warriors alike are powered by a demonic energy, Yoki (妖気), which allows shape-shifting and extreme strength. When warriors use too much Yoki, they "awaken", becoming a super-Yoma called an Awakened Being. The act of awakening is likened to the feeling of sexual climax, so while both male and female warriors existed in the past only the women proved to be successfully able to resist the allure of the awakening, and so the creation of male Claymores stopped altogether.

The island world is divided into 47 districts, with one warrior assigned to each.^{[ch. 25]} Claymore warriors No. 1 through 47 are ranked on their baseline Yoki potential, strength, agility, intelligence, sensing and leadership. A warrior's rank rises and falls according to the warrior's strength in relation to other warriors. It is unclear whether the warriors strength comes from training/experience or if the potential lies within the warriors themselves.

In addition to all having different names, most warriors (usually high in rank) further their individuality by possessing a unique sword technique, fighting style, or Yoki ability. Examples of sword techniques are: twisting the arm around and thrusting for a drill-like strike, unsheathing and re-sheathing the sword faster than the eye can see, or vibrating the sword so quickly the enemy cannot tell where the blade is coming from. A few fighting styles include: stretching the arm, fighting with two blades, and releasing a burst of Yoki for a momentary burst of speed. For Yoki ability, there are several Claymores who can sense Yoki over vast distances and very accurately in close quarters. This appears to be, while not offensive, a very rare and valuable ability and the Claymores in the Organization with this ability are usually highly ranked. In addition, there are four Claymores that have offensive techniques that are Yoki based. The first is Galatea's ability to control her opponents' Yoki for brief periods during battle, usually to cause the enemy's attack to miss. The second is Teresa's: her ability to sense Yoki is so strong that she can sense it moving around her opponents' body and can therefore sense how and when her enemy will attack next, a technique later copied by Clare. The third ability is that of Raftela who is able to manipulate the vision and movements of other Claymores. She is trained as an anti-Claymore warrior; a potential countermeasure against betrayal from within the Organization.

=== Story arcs ===
The first arc introduces the protagonist of the series: No. 47, Clare, who saves a young boy, Raki, from a Yoma and takes him on as her companion. The next arc flashes back to the time of Teresa, warrior No. 1 of her era, and the young orphan girl she saves—who is destined to one day take the name Clare. The arc ends with Teresa's tragic end at the hands of the Awakened Being Priscilla and Clare's vow to avenge the woman she had come to think of as her mother.

Flashing forward to Clare's time, the Slashers arc introduces Miria (No. 6), Deneve (No. 15), Helen (No. 22) and Galatea (No. 3). The Gravestones arc introduces the sadistic Ophelia (No. 4). The Witch's Maw arc introduces Jean (No. 9), Riful and Dauf. The Northern Campaign arc introduces Flora (No. 8), Undine (No. 11), Isley and Rigaldo. Raki and Priscilla reappear here as Clare moves to finally take her vengeance.

== Media ==
=== Manga ===
Written and illustrated by Norihiro Yagi, Claymore debuted in Shueisha's Monthly Shōnen Jump on June 6, 2001. (Note: It debuted in the magazine's July 2001 issue, released on June 6 of that same year.) The magazine ceased its publication on June 6, 2007. Following four special chapters published monthly in Weekly Shōnen Jump from July 2 to October 6, 2007, Claymore resumed publication in the then brand new magazine Jump Square on November 2 of the same year. Claymore finished after a thirteen-year-run on October 4, 2014. Shueisha collected its chapters in twenty-seven tankōbon volumes, released from January 5, 2002, to December 4, 2014.

On July 18, 2006, Viz Media announced the serialization of the Claymore manga in North America in its Shonen Jump manga anthology. Viz released the first volume of the series on April 4, 2006, and the last volume on October 6, 2015.

=== Anime ===
A 26-episode anime television series adaptation, produced by Nippon Television, D.N. Dream Partners, Avex Entertainment, and Madhouse, was broadcast on Nippon TV from April 4 to September 26, 2007. It was directed by Hiroyuki Tanaka, with Yasuko Kobayashi handling series composition, Takahiro Umehara designing the characters, and Masa Takumi composing the music. Avex collected its episodes on nine DVDs (labeled as "Chapters"), released from July 25, 2007, to March 26, 2008.

The series was licensed for English release in North America by Funimation (later Crunchyroll, LLC). Its episodes were released on six DVDs from October 14, 2008, to July 14, 2009. Funimation later released a complete Blu-ray set on February 16, 2010. After Crunchyroll merged with Funimation, the series began streaming on Crunchyroll. However, it was removed in October 2025.

==== Music ====
Two pieces of theme music are used for the episodes: one opening theme and one ending theme. The opening theme is "Raison d'être" (レゾンデートル; lit. 'Reason for being'), performed by Nightmare, and the ending theme is "Danzai no Hana: Guilty Sky" (断罪の花 ~Guilty Sky~; lit. 'Flower of Conviction: Guilty Sky'), performed by Riyu Kosaka. These two themes are used in all twenty-six episodes.

Two CDs have been released for the Claymore. The first soundtrack, entitled Claymore TV Animation O.S.T., contained tracks from the anime series and was released on July 25, 2007, with instrumental compositions by Masanori Takumi. Spanning 32 tracks, the soundtrack includes the television-sized versions of the opening and ending themes.

A second soundtrack, entitled Claymore Intimate Persona: Character Song Shuu (CLAYMORE INTIMATE PERSONA~キャラクターソング集~), was released on 27 September 2007. It contains ten tracks, one each for ten characters from the series, featuring songs performed by the character voice actresses from the anime adaptation.

=== Video game ===
Cover of Claymore: Gingan no Majo

Claymore: Gingan no Majo (CLAYMORE ～銀眼の魔女～; lit. Claymore: The Witch of the Silver Eyes) was released by Digital Works Entertainment, 28 May 2009, in Japan. In this Nintendo DS game, the player controls Clare in a similar fashion to side-scrolling Castlevania and Metroid games. Player can alter the strength of Clare's Yoki by using the touch screen and stylus. Abusing the power results in Clare becoming fully possessed by the Yoma, resulting in a game over.

=== Live-action TV series ===
In March 2025, a live-action television series adaptation was announced to be in development with CBS Studios, Propagate Content, Masi Oka, and Shueisha producing.

== Reception ==
In his review of the seventh manga volume, Carlo Santos of Anime News Network described Clare's action scenes as visually striking, with page layouts engineered for maximum dramatic effect. He noted that the drama occasionally attempted by the series felt oddly detached, and that the separation of Raki and Clare came across as a plot-driven necessity rather than an organic development. He rated the overall volume as B.

Theron Martin, also of Anime News Network, wrote in his review of the 14th manga volume that the series had lost some of its luster, with diminishing narrative progression per volume. He observed that the action scenes lacked the dynamism of earlier volumes, but affirmed that Yagi's artistry remained technically accomplished. He awarded the art an A− in his reviews for volumes eleven, twelve, and fourteen. In his review of the 16th manga volume, Martin stated that Yagi had returned to form, providing a balanced mix of returning characters, new allies, startling revelations, dire threats, and conventional action sequences, which restored the series to its strongest level since the 12th volume.

Martin also evaluated the first five episodes of the anime adaptation, remarking that despite certain flaws, they established a strong start and all but guaranteed that Funimation had a solid hit on its hands. On ICv2's "Top 50 Manga—Summer 2008" list, which subjectively ranked manga by sales and perceived popularity, Claymore placed 42nd.

Upon release, Weekly Famitsu gave Gingan no Majo a score of 21 out of 40.
