= Norihiro Yagi =

Japanese manga creator

Norihiro Yagi 八木 教広
- Born: 1968 (age 57–58) Naha, USCAR (now Naha, Okinawa, Japan)
- Areas: Writer, manga artist
- Notable works: Angel Densetsu; Claymore

Norihiro Yagi (八木 教広, Yagi Norihiro; born 1968) is a Japanese manga writer and artist from Okinawa Prefecture. He started making manga in 1990.

== Career ==
Yagi's first serialized manga was his comedy-genre Angel Densetsu, which appeared in Monthly Shōnen Jump from 1992 to 2000. His next serialized manga, Claymore, ran in the magazine between 2001 and 2014, completing at 155 chapters. Viz Media localized the manga for the North American market, and have released all 27 volumes in English as of October, 2015. His most recent series, Ariadne in the Blue Sky, was serialized in Shogakukan's Weekly Shōnen Sunday between 2017 and 2023.

== Awards ==
Norihiro Yagi is a successful manga artist, having won the 32nd Akatsuka Award for his first work, Undeadman. Undeadman appeared in Monthly Shōnen Jump and has had two sequels.

== Publications ==
- Undeadman – one-shot, 1990
- Angel Densetsu – 15 volumes, 1993–2000
- Claymore – 27 volumes, 2001–2014
- Arcadia of the Moonlight – one-shot, 2017
- Ariadne in the Blue Sky (蒼穹のアリアドネ, Sōkyū no Ariadone) – 22 volumes, 2017–2023
- The Knight and the Corpse (骸と騎士, Mukuro to kishi) – one-shot, 2024
- Bartlet Fairy Basslet – 2026 - ongoing

== Personal life ==
Yagi's favorite things to do in his spare time are to listen to hard rock music, play video games, drive, and perform martial arts. Yagi's favorite Japanese comedic duo is Downtown.
