= List of Eurobeat artists =

Name	Label(s)	Aliases	Groups	Notes
Alberto Contini	Discomagic, A-Beat C		A-Beat Friends, RCS (Rodgers, Contini and Sinclaire), A-Beat C All Stars	
Alessandra Mirka Gatti	A-Beat C, SCP-Music, Go Go's Music.	Domino, Juliet, Mirka, Eskimo, Sheela, Marie Aldridge, Paula Roberts.	Go Go Girls, King & Queen, Dynamika, A-Beat Sisters, 94 Sale, Groove Twins, Salt & Pepper, A-Beat C All Stars	
Alex De Rosso	A-Beat C, Dave Rodgers Music	Ace Warrior		
Andrea Delfino	Asia Records, FCF Records, Radiorama Productions, Time Records, Hi-NRG Attack, World Energy Music, LED Records, Flea Records, High Energy, Energy Revolution, Eurobeat Records, Beaver Music, GReurosound	Claude Maene, Judy Crystal, Lilac, Tanya Baker, Rita Hollywood, Ross, Sodapops, Veronica, Baby Gold, Black Eva, Ciao Ciao, Cindy, Claudia Vip, Dolly Pop, Giorgia Barrows, Jee Bee, Lady Energy, Leslie Hammond, Live Music Gang, Lou-Lou Marina, Maddy Layne, Mara Nell, Michelle Rose, Mony Honey, Nikita Jr, Nikka Hollywood, Mistery, Barbie Young, Virgin, Andrea, Asia Gang, Ciao Ciao, Cindy, Jenny Kee, Laurie, Mela, Moltocarina, Superlove		
Andrea Leonardi	A-Beat C, Delta, SinclaireStyle	Bratt Sinclaire	RCS (Rodgers, Contini, & Sinclaire), A-Beat C All Stars	
Annerley Gordon	A-Beat C, Time Records	Annalise, Lolita, Virginelle, Ann Sinclair, Niki Niki.	Go Go Girls, A-Beat C All Stars, Groove Twins, King & Queen.	Famous English pop singer under the name Ann Lee
Clara Moroni	Time Records, Flea Records, Asia Records, Delta Music Industry	Mela, Linda Ross, Cherry, Denise, Donna, Vanessa, Virgin, Leslie Parrish, Vicky Vale	Les Blue Belles, Guipsy & Queen, Kate & Karen, Eurobeat Girls	Owner and CEO of Delta Music Industry.
Cristiana Cucchi	Hi-NRG Attack, Flea.	Bazooka Girl, Samanta Claus, Chris, Cristiana, HRG Unlimited, Cindy, Lou Lou Marina, Princess F., Valery Scott, Leslie Hammond, Betty Blue.	Live Music Gang	
Daniela Galli	Time Records	Dany, Magika, Susy Time		
Davide Di Marcantonio	Dima Music, Energy Revolution, SCP Music, Akyr Music, Vibration, Eurobeat Union, Time Records, Eurobeat Masters, LED Records, Dave Rodgers Music, Avex Trax	Big Warez, David Dima, Dream Fighters, Nine9Nine, Platinum Saber, Power Dreams, Water Queen, Habegale, Laura Princess, Chemical Boy, David, Dave Mc Loud, Tiger Shark, David Kane, Dee Dee, Electric Rock Band, J Rush/J.Rush, Mr Odyssey, Captain America, David Bird, Jackie 'O, Jo Sterling, Chester, Dr. Money, Frank Torpedo, Robert Patton, Thomas T., Tommy K., Cindy Cooper, Eurobeat Lovers, Jimmy Bravo, Vibration All Stars, Lou Grant, Double D, SEB All Stars	Double D (as David Dima, with Dave Rodgers). Speed All Stars (with Gianni Coraini, John Desire and Maria Short). Vibration All Stars (with Gino Caria). Eurobeat Lovers (with John Desire). Double D (as David Dima, with Dave Rodgers). SEB All Stars (with Alessandra Mirka Gatti, Christian Codenotti, Ennio Zanini, Evelin Malferrari, Frederico Pasquini, Frederico Rimonti, Giancarlo Pasquini, Luigi Raimondi, Maurizio De Jorio, Mauro Farina).	Owner of Dima Music and cofounder of Eurobeat Masters with Luigi Stanga.
Denise De Vincenzo	A-Beat-C, SinclaireStyle, GoGo's Music, Dave Rodgers Music, Kawa Beat	Nuage, Go Go Girls	Go Go Girls (with Elena Gobbi Frattini in "Baby Boy")	
Elena Ferretti	Time Records, Asia Records, A Beat-C, Delta, Eurogrooves.	Sophie, Alexis, Sara, Karina, Jenny Kee, Marie Belle, Helena, Ann Sinclair, Jilly, Rose, Elisha, Victoria, Erika, Linda, Valentina, Margaret, Queen Of Times, Vanessa, Barbie, Vanity, Apple.	Love & Pride, Eurosisters, King & Queen, A-Beat Sisters, Kate & Karen, Gipsy & Queen, Za-Za	Used the alias Barbara Maniscalch at A-Beat C
Fabio Lione	A-Beat C	J. Storm	A-Beat C All Stars	Fabio Lione (J. Storm) is the vocalist in the rock band Rhapsody
Giancarlo Pasquini	Flea, Time Records, A-Beat C, Go Go's Music (producer only), Sun Fire Records, Dave Rodgers Music.	Dave Rodgers, Lucky Boy, Dr. Money, Mike Hammer, Robert Stone, Chester, Patrick Hooley, Coriander, The Big Brother, Robert Patton, Mario Ross, Romeo, Atrium, Alkogan.	The Spiders From Mars, Dynamika, Happy Hour, Aleph, A Beat Friends, Thomas & Schubert, Red Skins, RCS (Rodgers, Contini, & Sinclaire), A-Beat C All Stars.	Married Alessandra Mirka Gatti (Domino), but broke up. As a hyper techno singer, he uses the alias La Cima
Gianni Coraini	Flea, Time Records, A-Beat C, Delta, Asia, Boom Boom Beat, Vibration.	DJ NRG, KL Jones, Alvin, Maltese, Gordon Jim, Ric Fellini, Francis Cooper, Danny Keith, Ken Laszlo, Boysband, Billy the Butcher, Captain America, Otello, Fancy, Maxx Ducati, Jackie 'O, Jean Corraine, J. Corraine, Ken Hunter, Boys Band, Mr. Bean, Spencer.		
Giordano Gambogi	Time Records, Eurogrooves, A-Beat C.	Arena 69, David R. Jones, D-Team, DJ Force, Energy Man, Eurogrooves All Stars, Jim Bogart, Jordan, Kasanova, Mark Gillan, MC Thunder, Mike West, Money Man, Mr. M/Mr. Music, Petrarka, Time All Stars, Time Force, Triumph	Eurogrooves All Stars (with Christian De Leo, Annerley Gordon, and Elena Ferretti). As well as Time All Stars (Tonight Is Christmas only, with Claudio Magnani, Patrizia Saitta, and Elena Ferretti)	
Kiko Loureiro	A-Beat C, Go Go's Music		A-Beat C All Stars	Is the guitarist of Brazilian metal band Angra and American metal band Megadeth
Maurizio De Jorio	A-Beat C, Delta, SinclaireStyle.	Jack Powers, Niko, D.Essex, David Essex, Oda, Marko Polo, Morris, Max Coveri, Eddy Huntington, 7th Heaven, Cody, Casanova, Dejo.	Tokyo Future, Edo Boys.	
Roberto Tiranti	A-Beat C, Sun Fire Records, Dave Rodgers Music	Powerful T., De La Vega, Bon Tempest,	A-Beat C All Stars	

== See also ==
- List of Italo disco artists
