= J-Euro Non-Stop Best =

Compilation album by various artists
- Released: September 27, 2001
- Genre: Italo disco Hi-NRG; J-pop
- Length: 78:00
- Label: Avex Trax
- Producer: Masato "Max" Matsuura

J-Euro Non-Stop Best is a megamix compilation album, consisting of recordings by various Avex artists produced and/or remixed by various music producers mostly those of eurobeat from Italy, released in 2001 by Avex Trax.

As an album in the Super Eurobeat Presents : J-Euro series, J-Euro Non-Stop Best contained 30 tracks including ones sung by prominent Avex artists such as Ayumi Hamasaki, MAX and Every Little Thing.

J-Euro Non-Stop Best can be considered a greatest hits album, as the album consists of many smash hits in the 2000 "J-Euro" boom in the Para Para scene.

== Tracks ==
#	Track	By	Ref
1	Fly High (Euro-Power Mix)	Ayumi Hamasaki	
2	Boys & Girls (A Eurobeat Mix)	Ayumi Hamasaki	
3	Aishiattemasu? (New Generation Mix)	Key-A-Kiss	
4	Damejyan (New Generation Mix)	Key-A-Kiss	
5	Ano Natsu Eto (Time Go Go Remix)	MAX	
6	Ginga no Chikai (Eurobeat Mix)	MAX	
7	Winnie-the-Pooh (Eurobeat Version)	Key-A-Kiss	
8	True Love	Hiroko Anzai	
9	Depend on You (Extended Power Mix)	Ayumi Hamasaki	
10	monochrome (Ayu-ro Extended Mix)	Ayumi Hamasaki	
11	My Will (Sweet Dream Mix)	Dream	
12	Hikari no Veil (Extended Joyful Mix)	MAX	
13	Give Me a Shake (Euro-Power Mix)	MAX	
14	Just the Way to Love (Pete Hammond 80's Style Re-Mix)	Trinity	
15	Please Give Me Something	Osaka Purin (Tokyo Purin & Yurimari)	
16	Remember Me	Passion	
17	Heartbeat (B4 Za Beat "DJ Shu" Remix)	Passion	
18	fragile (Eurobeat Mix)	Every Little Thing	
19	Break Out! (Eurobeat Mix)	Nanase Aikawa	
20	survival dAnce ~no no cry more~ (Eurobeat Mix)	TRF	
21	Private Wars (Euro Mix)	Dream	
22	Techno Drive	PB2	
23	Freedom (Global Extended Mix)	globe	
24	Face the Change (Eurobeat Remix)	Every Little Thing	
25	Gamble Rumble	Move	
26	Speedy Speedy	Passion	
27	Deluxe (Eurobeat Mix)	Key-A-Kiss	
28	Watashi no Kare ha Sekiyuoh (Y & Co. Euro Oil Mix)	Key-A-Kiss Panic	
29	No.1 ~Kagayake Otome~ (DJ Shu's Light Mix3)	Tokyo Purin	
30	Audience (Euro-Power Mix)	Ayumi Hamasaki	

== Further details ==
#20 "survival dAnce"

J-Euro Non-Stop Best is an album in the Super Eurobeat Presents : J-Euro series launched in 2000, along with Ayu-ro Mix 1–2 featuring Ayumi Hamasaki, Euro Every Little Thing featuring Every Little Thing, Hyper Euro MAX featuring MAX, Euro Global featuring globe, Euro "Dream" Land featuring Dream, and J-Euro Best.

The non-stop mixing was done by two members of the team New Generation; Seiji Honma and Katsunari Mochizuki.

The album appeared on Oricon's weekly album chart four times and reached #29 in October 2001.

#	Track	Length	Ref	Remix / Produce	Ref
1	Fly High (Euro-Power Mix)	3:20		Dave Rodgers	
2	Boys & Girls (A Eurobeat Mix)	2:21		Sergio Dall'ora & Luca Degani	
3	Aishiattemasu? (New Generation Mix)	2:36		New Generation	
4	Damejyan (New Generation Mix)	2:24		New Generation	
5	Ano Natsu Eto (Time Go Go Remix)	2:32		Sergio Dall'ora & Luca Degani	
6	Ginga no Chikai (Eurobeat Mix)	2:24		Sergio Dall'ora & Luca Degani	
7	Winnie-the-Pooh (Eurobeat Version)	1:59		Dave Rodgers	
8	True Love	2:22		Dave Rodgers	
9	Depend on You (Extended Power Mix)	2:33		Dave Rodgers & Alberto Contini	
10	monochrome (Ayu-ro Extended Mix)	3:08		Bratt Sinclaire	
11	My Will (Sweet Dream Mix)	3:25		Laurent Newfield	
12	Hikari no Veil (Extended Joyful Mix)	2:18		Dave Rodgers & Alberto Contini	
13	Give Me a Shake (Euro-Power Mix)	2:54		Dave Rodgers	
14	Just the Way to Love (Pete Hammond 80's Style Re-Mix)	3:13		Pete Hammond	
15	Please Give Me Something	2:27		Dave Rodgers & S. Olivia	
16	Remember Me	2:23		Newfield-Sinclaire	
17	Heartbeat (B4 Za Beat "DJ Shu" Remix)	2:14		Newfield-Sinclaire	
18	fragile (Eurobeat Mix)	3:38		Laurent Newfield	
19	Break Out! (Eurobeat Mix)	1:19		Dave Rodgers & S. Olivia	
20	survival dAnce ~no no cry more~ (Eurobeat Mix)	2:42		Sergio Dall'ora & Luca Degani	
21	Private Wars (Euro Mix)	2:35		Y & Co.	
22	Techno Drive	1:55		Daisuke Asakura	
23	Freedom (Global Extended Mix)	2:31		Sergio Dall'ora & Luca Degani	
24	Face the Change (Eurobeat Remix)	2:45		Sergio Dall'ora & Luca Degani	
25	Gamble Rumble	2:34		—	
26	Speedy Speedy	2:23		Dave Rodgers	
27	Deluxe (Eurobeat Mix)	2:59		Y & Co. Ltd.	
28	Watashi no Kare ha Sekiyuoh (Y & Co. Euro Oil Mix)	2:12		Remo-con Tamura	
29	No.1 ~Kagayake Otome~ (DJ Shu's Light Mix3)	2:39		B4 Za Beat	
30	Audience (Euro-Power Mix)	3:00		Dave Rodgers	
