= Super Eurobeat Presents Euro Dream Land =

Remix album by Dream
- Released: September 20, 2000
- Genre: Electronic, Pop (Hi-NRG, J-pop)
- Length: 60:00
- Label: Avex Trax

Super Eurobeat Presents Euro Dream Land is a remix album, consisting of recordings by Japanese all-girl dance band Dream, released in the late 2000 by Avex Trax.

As an album in the Super Eurobeat Presents : J-Euro series, Euro Dream Land mainly features eurobeat remixes of previously released Dream's songs. The album also contains one megamix and several cover versions of eurobeat songs originally made in Italy.

== Tracks ==
#	Track	Length	Ref
1	Reality (Euro-dream Mix)	4:37	
2	Send A Little Love (Eurobeat Mix)	5:30	
3	Private Wars (Dream Land Mix)	5:15	
4	Start Me Up (Sweet Dream Mix)	5:22	
5	Heart On Wave (Eurobeat Mix)	5:03	
6	Breakin' Out (Euro-Power Mix)	5:09	
7	Movin' On (Eurobeat Mix)	5:47	
8	Jealousy	4:07	
9	Hello Goodbye	3:36	
10	Do You Wanna Dance	4:14	
11	Night of Fire	4:07	
12	Euro Dream Land Hyper Non-Stop Megamix	7:05	

== Further details ==
#5 "Heart On Wave (Eurobeat Mix)"

Euro Dream Land is an album in the Super Eurobeat Presents : J-Euro series launched in 2000, along with Ayu-ro Mix 1–2 featuring Ayumi Hamasaki, Euro Every Little Thing featuring Every Little Thing, Hyper Euro MAX featuring MAX, Euro Global featuring globe, J-Euro Best and J-Euro Non-Stop Best.

The album appeared on Oricon's weekly album chart six times and reached #10 by November 6, 2000.

#	Track	Written by	Composed by	Remixed by	Ref
1	Reality (Euro-dream Mix)	Mai Matsumuro	Y@suo Ohtani	Dave Rodgers	
2	Send A Little Love (Eurobeat Mix)	Mai Matsumuro	Hideaki Kuwahara	Luca Degani & Sergio Dall'ora	
3	Private Wars (Dream Land Mix)	Yuko Ebine	D.A.I	Bratt Sinclaire	
4	Start Me Up (Sweet Dream Mix)	Yuko Ebine	Hideaki Kuwahara	Delta Team	
5	Heart On Wave (Eurobeat Mix)	Yuko Ebine	Kazuhito Kikuchi	Luca Degani & Sergio Dall'ora	
6	Breakin' Out (Euro-Power Mix)	Yuko Ebine	Kazuhito Kikuchi	Dave Rodgers	
7	Movin' On (Eurobeat Mix)	Yuko Ebine	Hideaki Kuwahara	Luca Degani & Sergio Dall'ora	
8	Jealousy	Yuko Ebine	A. Contini, G. Pasquini, S. Oliva	—	
9	Hello Goodbye	Yuko Ebine	G. Foglia - C. Moroni	—	
10	Do You Wanna Dance	Masumi Iizuka	G. Pasquini, S. Oliva	—	
11	Night of Fire	Mai Matsumuro	A. Leonardi	—	
12	Euro Dream Land Hyper Non-Stop Megamix	Various	Various	Katsunari Mochizuki, Seiji Honma	

Track 12 is a megamix with 7 tracks. The non-stop mixing was handled by Katsunari Mochizuki and Seiji Honma.

"Send A Little Love (Eurobeat Mix)" in the megamix

#	Track	Ref
12-1	Reality (Euro-dream Mix)	
12-2	Breakin' Out (Euro-Power Mix)	
12-3	Private Wars (Dream Land Mix)	
12-4	Start Me Up (Sweet Dream Mix)	
12-5	Heart On Wave (Eurobeat Mix)	
12-6	Send A Little Love (Eurobeat Mix)	
12-7	Movin' On (Eurobeat Mix)	
