= Super Eurobeat Presents Ayu-ro Mix =

2000 remix album by Ayumi Hamasaki

Remix album by Ayumi Hamasaki
- Released: February 16, 2000
- Genres: Eurobeat, J-pop
- Length: 75:37
- Label: Avex Trax

Ayumi Hamasaki chronology
Ayu-mi-x (1999)	Super Eurobeat Presents Ayu-ro Mix (2000)	Ayu-mi-x II Version Jpn (2000)

Super Eurobeat Presents Ayu-ro Mix is the second remix album by Japanese singer Ayumi Hamasaki. The album was released on February 16, 2000, and became the second highest selling remix album in Japan of 2000, with 700,000 copies sold. The album became Hamasaki's longest charting remix album with over 31 weeks on the chart. It is the 4th best selling remix album in Japan and also the 7th best selling remix album worldwide.

== Overview ==
Ayu-ro Mix is an album in the Super Eurobeat Presents: J-Euro series launched in 2000, along with Euro Every Little Thing featuring Every Little Thing, Hyper Euro MAX featuring MAX, Euro Global featuring globe, Euro "Dream" Land featuring Dream, and the successor Ayu-ro Mix 2. Several tracks on the album were later included on J-Euro Best and J-Euro Non-Stop Best.

== Track listing ==
1. Fly High (Euro-Power Mix) (from Loveppears) Remixed by Dave Rodgers
2. Appears (Aggressive Extended Mix) (from Loveppears) Remixed by Sergio Dall'ora & Luca Degani
3. Boys & Girls (A Eurosenti Mix) (from Loveppears) Remixed by Sergio Dall'ora & Luca Degani
4. Depend on You (Eurosenti Mix) (from A Song for ××) Remixed by Dave Rodgers & Alberto Contini
5. Monochrome (Ayu-ro Extended Mix) (from Loveppears) Remixed by Bratt Sinclaire
6. Too Late (Euro-Power Mix) (from Loveppears) Remixed by Dave Rodgers & Alberto Contini
7. Trauma (Eurobeat Mix) (from Loveppears) Remixed by Dave Rodgers & Alberto Contini
8. Trust (A Eurobeat Mix) (from A Song for ××) Remixed by Sergio Dall'ora & Luca Degani
9. Whatever (Sentimental Mix) (from Loveppears) Remixed by Laurent Newfield
10. End Roll (Ayu-ro Extended Mix) (from Loveppears) Remixed by Laurent Newfield
11. Poker Face (Eurosenti Mix) (from A Song for ××) Remixed by Dave Rodgers & Alberto Contini
12. You (Aggressive Mix) (from A Song for ××) Remixed by Bratt Sinclaire
13. To Be (Eurobeat Mix) (from A Song for ××) Remixed by Dave Rodgers
14. immature (Sweet Mix) (from Loveppears) Remixed by Laurent Newfield
15. kanariya (Power Mix) (from Loveppears) Remixed by Laurent Newfield

Copies sold: 650,000+ (Japan) 800,000 (Worldwide)

== Charts ==
Weekly charts
Chart (2000)	Peak position
Japanese Albums (Oricon)	2

Year-end charts
Chart (2000)	Position
Japanese Albums (Oricon)	38

== Super Eurobeat Presents Ayu-ro Mix 2 ==
Super Eurobeat Presents Ayu-ro Mix 2

Remix album by Ayumi Hamasaki
- Released: September 27, 2001
- Genres: Electronic, Hi-NRG
- Label: Avex Trax
- Producer: Max Matsuura

Ayumi Hamasaki chronology
ayu-mi-x III Acoustic Orchestra Version (2001)	Super Eurobeat Presents Ayu-ro Mix 2 (2001)	Cyber Trance Presents Ayu Trance (2001)

Super Eurobeat Presents Ayu-ro Mix 2 is the fifth remix album by Japanese singer Ayumi Hamasaki. Remixed by various eurobeat producers from Italy, it was released on September 27th, 2001 by Avex Trax.

"You (Aggressive Mix)" by Ayumi Hamasaki
Remixed by Bratt Sinclaire, from Ayu-ro Mix

It is Hamasaki's only remix album to reach the #1 spot on the chart. The album sold a total of 435,760 copies by the end of its chart run.

=== Track listing ===
1. Audience "Euro-Power Mix" (from Duty) – remixed by Dave Rodgers
2. Evolution "Time Is Pop Mix" – remixed by Luca Degani and Sergio Dall'ora
3. Seasons "A Eurobeat Mix" (from Duty) – remixed by Luca Degani and Sergio Dall'ora
4. Duty "Power Mind Mix" – remixed by Laurent Newfield
5. Vogue "Traditional Mix" (from Duty) – remixed by Dave Rodgers
6. M "Sweet Heart Mix" (from A Best) - remixed by Laurent Newfield
7. Never Ever "Eurobeat Mix" – remixed by Dave Rodgers
8. Endless Sorrow "A Aggressive Mix" – remixed by Luca Degani and Sergio Dall'ora
9. Far Away "ayu-ro Extended Mix" (from Duty) – remixed by Bratt Sinclaire
10. Surreal "Time A Go-Go Mix" (from Duty) – remixed by Luca Degani and Sergio Dall'ora
11. Appears "Melodic Extended Mix" (from Loveppears) – remixed by Luca Degani and Sergio Dall'ora
12. Kanariya "Sweet Mix" (from Loveppears) – remixed by Laurent Newfield
13. Immature "Power Mix" (from Loveppears) - remixed by Laurent Newfield
14. Unite! "Euro-Power Mix" – remixed by Dave Rodgers

=== Charts ===
Weekly charts
Chart (2001)	Peak position
Japanese Albums (Oricon)	1

Year-end charts
Chart (2001)	Position
Japanese Albums (Oricon)	51

== "J-Euro" ==
Like its predecessor Ayu-ro Mix, the album is an issue in the Super Eurobeat Presents: J-Euro series launched in 2000, along with Euro Every Little Thing featuring Every Little Thing, Hyper Euro MAX featuring MAX, Euro Global featuring globe, and Euro "Dream" Land featuring Dream. Several tracks on the album can also be found on J-Euro Non-Stop Best.

== See also ==
- List of best-selling remix albums worldwide
