= Super Eurobeat presents Euro Every Little Thing =

Super Eurobeat Presents Euro Every Little Thing

Remix album by Every Little Thing
- Released: September 5, 2001; September 12, 2016
- Genres: Italo disco; Hi-NRG
- Length: 77:00
- Label: Avex Trax
- Producer: Various

Every Little Thing chronology
4 Force (2001)	Super Eurobeat Presents Euro Every Little Thing (2001)	Every Ballad Songs (2001)

Super Eurobeat Presents Euro Every Little Thing is a remix album, consisting of recordings by Japanese pop group Every Little Thing remixed by various eurobeat producers from Italy, released in 2001 by Avex Trax.

== Tracks ==
#	Track	Style	Remixer	Length	Ref
1	For the Moment	Euroverdrive Remix	Laurent G. Newfield	5:19	
2	Face the Change	Melodic Remix	Luca Degani, Sergio Dall'ora	5:28	
3	Deatta Koro No You Ni	Pop Remix	Bratt Sinclaire	4:08	
4	Forever Yours	Euro-Pop Mix	Dave Rodgers	5:00	
5	Rescue Me	Melancholy Mix	Luca Degani, Sergio Dall'ora	4:44	
6	Necessary	Power Mix	Bratt Sinclaire	5:16	
7	Future World	Euro-Power Mix	Dave Rodgers	4:06	
8	Time Goes By	Eurosenti Mix	Luca Degani, Sergio Dall'ora	5:19	
9	Pray	Delta Pop Mix	Bratt Sinclaire	5:07	
10	Someday Someplace	Europop Mix	Luca Degani, Sergio Dall'ora	5:20	
11	Shapes of Love	Plug And Play Mix	Laurent G. Newfield	5:35	
12	Over and Over	Traditional Mix	Dave Rodgers	4:54	
13	Feel My Heart	Eurobeat Mix	Luca Degani, Sergio Dall'ora	5:30	
14	Sure	Eurolovers Remix	Laurent G. Newfield	5:33	
15	Fragile	White Roses Remix	Laurent G. Newfield	5:52	

== Further details ==
Euro Every Little Thing is an album in the Super Eurobeat Presents : J-Euro series launched in 2000, along with the likes of Ayu-ro Mix 1–2 featuring Ayumi Hamasaki, Hyper Euro MAX featuring MAX, Euro Global featuring globe, Euro "Dream" Land featuring Dream, J-Euro Best and J-Euro Non-Stop Best.

#12 "Over and Over (Traditional Mix)"

The album appeared on Oricon's album chart ten times, and reached #3.
