= Unison: Rebels of Rhythm & Dance =

2000 video game

- North American PlayStation 2 cover art
- Developer: Tecmo
- Publisher: Tecmo
- Platform: PlayStation 2
- Release: JP: November 30, 2000; NA: March 26, 2001
- Genre: Music
- Modes: Single-player, multiplayer

Unison: Rebels of Rhythm & Dance (sometimes known as simply Unison) is a rhythm video game released for the PlayStation 2 in 2000 which featured unique controls and generally considered to have above-average graphics for its genre of game. It is heavily inspired by J-pop, anime and the formation of musical girl groups.

== Gameplay ==
At the start of the game, players choose whether to directly control any one of the girls: Trill, Cela or Chilly. This choice roughly corresponds to a difficulty selection - Trill is Normal, Cela is Hard and Chilly is Very Hard. Once a story cutscene has introduced the song to be performed in the next act, the game moves into a practice session to teach the player the movements necessary to successfully pull off the performance. Movements are accomplished by following the on-screen markers using the PS2's analog sticks to mimic the motions of arms and legs throughout a dance; if a character on the screen is waving their right arm, the movement is likely accomplished by rolling the right analog stick like a waving arm.

For the practice session, the song can either be learned in its entirety, or in portions. In the original Japanese release, songs had to be successfully learned in parts, and then as the entire number before moving on. The US release made this process much simpler by allowing the player to keep the markers present throughout the entire game; in the Japanese version, these would progressively be taken away, meaning the player had to commit the dances to memory, making the practice session much more necessary. In either version, the game contains a total of twelve songs that can be played in "Club Tecmo" mode ("Club Afro" in the Japanese version) with up to three players by using a PS2 multitap. The song lists have some differences between the versions.

== Plot ==
The game's plot, taking place in the futuristic city of Twin Ships, centers around the exploits of three girls - Trill, Cela and Chilly - and mascot Friday as they struggle against the dictatorship of a man known only as Ducker, who can use his voice to exert a hypnotic influence over people and only allow them to experience his peculiar brands of fun, which has outlawed anything creative aside from his own music; dancing, in particular, is especially prohibited. Gathered together by a man known as Doctor Dance - who happens to dress in what passes as stereotypical 1960s attire and possesses a large afro - the three girls form the musical dance group Unison, and set about putting on a series of performances over Twin Ships' airwaves to rally the public to their cause and bring dancing back to the people. In opposition of Unison are Ducker and his personal servants who routinely try to capture the girls.

== Characters ==
Japanese names are italicized.

- Trill: Unison's lead vocalist and dancer, she plays the role of the stereotypical ditzy blonde. Easily excited and eager to do the right thing. Voiced by Rumiko Varnes.
- Cela: A quiet green-haired girl who seems to have a history with Ducker, and the most logical minded of the trio. Voiced by Terry Osada.
- Chilly: A tomboy who practices Unison's most demanding dance moves. Voiced by Gerri Sorrells.
- Friday: Chilly's pet robot, the token "cute animal thing" for the story.
- Doctor Dance (Dance Teacher): The organizer of Unison and the mastermind of their plan to reintroduce the citizens of Twin Ships to dancing. He is of another world. Friday frequently tries to chew on his hair. Voiced by Paul Lucas.
- Emperor Ducker: The evil leader of Twin Ships, who is often seen literally riding in an oversized rubber ducky. Voiced by Chris Wells.
- June Baby (Manajun): A singer trained by Ducker to regain his audience from Unison's pirate broadcasts, easily driven to anger when she's not getting what she wants. She Likes Doctor Dance. Voiced by Rumiko Varnes.
- Like & Y'Know (Potti & Guno): Heads of the Ducker Fan Club, both of whom are frequently subjected to Ducker's wrath, either by accident or in retribution for messing up a plan. As their names suggest, Like tends to include the word "like" in his sentences, and the same for Y'Know. They are voiced by Tom Clark and Jeff Manning, respectively.
- The Barn Family (Yamashita Family): A trio of average Twin Ships citizens - a man and his wife and daughter - who are fans of Ducker's music shows. As they are subjected to Unison's broadcasts, they are shown to gradually become fans of the girls. They reflect the changing, pro-dancing attitude of Twin Ships as a whole.

== Japanese Songlist and Original Artists ==
- Y.M.C.A. - The Village People
- Neraiuchi (Take Aim and Shoot) - Linda Yamamoto
- First Love - Hikaru Utada
- Love Machine - Morning Musume
- Sailor-Fuku o Nugasanaide (Don't Make Me Take Off My Sailor Suit) - Onyanko Club
- Yosaku (Honor and Virtue) - Saburō Kitajima
- Boys & Girls - Ayumi Hamasaki
- Night of Fire - Niko
- Dschinghis Khan - Dschinghis Khan
- Hajimete no Chuu (First Kiss) - Anshin Papa
- UFO - Pink Lady
- Synchronized Love Millennium - Joe Rinoie

== American Songlist and Original Artists ==
- Y.M.C.A. - The Village People
- Country Grammar - Nelly
- We Are Family - Sister Sledge
- Stop the Rock - Apollo 440
- Barbie Girl - Aqua
- Yosaku (Honor and Virtue) - Saburō Kitajima
- That's the Way (I Like It) - KC and the Sunshine Band
- Night of Fire - Niko
- Nowhere - Faze4
- O.P.P. - Naughty By Nature
- Everybody Dance - Chic
- Synchronized Love Millennium - Joe Rinoie

== Development ==
The game was showcased at the Autumn Tokyo Game Show. 10-15 people were working on the game.

== Reception ==
Reception

Aggregate score
Aggregator	Score
Metacritic	68/100

Review scores
Publication	Score
AllGame	2/5
Edge	5/10
Electronic Gaming Monthly	6.17/10 (Note: Three critics of Electronic Gaming Monthly gave the game each a score of 7/10, 6/10, and 5.5/10.)
Famitsu	30/40
Game Informer	7.75/10
GameSpot	5.2/10
IGN	8.3/10
Next Generation	4/5
Official U.S. PlayStation Magazine	3.5/5
X-Play	3/5

The game received "average" reviews according to the review aggregation website Metacritic. Kevin Rice of NextGen said of the game, "It's not the same leap that PaRappa was, but it's a great rhythm game with beautiful graphics, excellent music, and creative controls. Recommended." In Japan, Famitsu gave it a score of 30 out of 40. However, Four-Eyed Dragon of GamePro said, "Don't expect Unison to be anything like other dance games. Its most distinguishable feature, which is also the game's low point, is the control. Using both analog sticks, you must move in particular directions to make your character dance. With no cues, this 'dancing' is more memorization than following a beat, which makes Unison frustrating. The cutesy visuals, however, may put a smile on your face, while decent music pays homage to tunes from the '70s, '80s, and '90s. That's not enough to swing to this awful routine, though – you'll never be in sync with Unison." (Note: GamePro gave the game 3/5 for graphics, 4/5 for sound, 1.5/5 for control, and 2/5 for fun factor.)
