= Elena Ferretti =

Italian Eurobeat and Italo disco singer (born 1960)

- Born: Elena Ferretti; 1960 (age 65–66); San Donato Milanese, Italy
- Genres: Italo disco; Eurobeat; Hi-NRG; Eurodance
- Years active: 1983–present
- Labels: Time; Delta; Eurogrooves; Avex Trax

Elena Ferretti (born 1960), better known as Sophie or Rose, is an Italian Eurobeat and Italo disco singer. She has performed and recorded for many record labels, under many aliases. Her music was produced by various well-known Italian producers, namely Giacomo Maiolini, Mauro Farina, Sergio Dall'Ora and Giancarlo Pasquini.

She often collaborated with Clara Moroni, who wrote many of her compositions. Moroni also did most of the backing vocals/choirs for Ferretti's songs for Time Records. Together with Moroni, she was a member of the duo Gipsy & Queen. In 2011, she recorded and released an Italian folk song entitled "Io Libera". Among her best known hits is the song "My World" (as Sophie).

== Career ==
Most of her work throughout the 1990s was recorded for compilation albums such as Super Eurobeat, Maharaja Night, Eurobeat Flash, and many more.

== The Voice Senior ==
In November 2020, Ferretti participated in The Voice Senior Italy, where she passed the first round with all judges rotating their chairs. She chose to join Team Gigi. After winning the semi-finals, she participated in the grand finale, where she ended in second place after public televoting. The following year in 2021, she participated in the Sanremo Festival.

== Discography ==
=== Albums ===
- 1982 - Firefly - Firefly III (Mr. Disc Organization – MDO 58705)
- 1986 - Radiorama – Desires And Vampires (Ariola – 207 909)
- 1988 - Gipsy & Queen - Action (Time Records - TRD 1078)
- 1989 - Chip Chip - Close To Me (Flea Records – FL/LP 012)
- 1989 - King Kong & D'Jungle Girls – Boom Boom Dollar (Alfa International – 29B2-109)
- 1989 - Macho Gang - Macho & Lions (Macho Records - MACHO 12.10)
- 1989 - Sophie - My World (Victor – VDP-1458)
- 1989 - Sophie - Tales To Tell (Time Records – TRD 1098)
- 1991 - Gipsy & Queen - Love and Passion (Alfa International – ALCB-192)
- 1991 - Sophie - Maxi-Singles (Asia Pride - SMXS-1302-91)
- 1991 - Sophie - The Only Reason (Victor – VICP-130)
- 1992 - Moltocarina - Voice of The Night (Alfa International – ALCB-641)
- 1993 - Gipsy & Queen - The Best Of (Loading Bay Records - LBAYCD 502)
- 1993 - Sophie - The Best Of (Loading Bay Records - LBAYCD 501)
- 1995 - King & Queen - Season (Avex Trax – AVCD-11298)
- 1995 - Sophie - Stop The Music (Avex Trax – AVCD-11345)
- 1995 - Valentina - Your Love (Avex Trax – AVCD-11320)
- 1996 - Rose - Memories (The Best Of) (Polish Bootleg)
- 1997 - Helena - With You (Avex Trax/Time Records - AVCD-114??)
- 1999 - Gipsy & Queen - Boy Toy (Time Records - ???)
- 2000 - Sophie - Make it Feel Good (Avex Trax - AVCD-115??)
- 2002 - Valentina - That You Want (A-Beat C - none)
- 2009 - Groove Twins – Super Eurobeat presents Groove Twins Special Collection (Rodgers & Contini Records, iTunes release)
- 2009 - Valentina - Super Eurobeat presents Valentina Special Collection (Rodgers & Contini Records, iTunes release)

=== EPs ===
- Acoustic
- Live at Musicansieme 2008

=== Singles ===
A-Beat Sisters (A-Beat C)

- "We're Dancing Together" (1997)
- "Love & Peace" (1999)

Alexis (Eurogrooves)

- "Sugar Baby" (1993)
- "Don't Cry To Me" (1994)
- "Another Day Another Night" (1994)
- "Hungry Hungry" (1995)
- "Up All Night" (1996)
- "Harmony" (1998)
- "Love's Theme" (1998)
- "Fly To My Paradise" (1998)
- "Save My Heart" (1998)
- "Sweet Love & Passion" (1998)
- "Babe Je T'Aime" (1999)
- "Feelin' To Fly" (1999)
- "Stay With Me" (2000)
- "Don't Worry Baby" (2000)
- "Night Angel" (2000)
- "Passion" (2001)
- "Wonderful Night" (2002)
- "Living On A Prayer" (2002)
- "Calling My Number" (2002)
- "Wait For Me" (2003)
- "Take Me Take Me" (2004)
- "Don't You Forget My Love" (2004)
- "Love Is Burning" (2005)
- "One Night In Tokyo" (2006)
- "Blue" (2006)
- "Beautiful" (2007)
- "Night Prayer" (2007)
- "Just A Game 2008" (2008)
- "Bye Bye Japan" (Healing Eurogrooves Remix) (2010)

Andrea & Baby Girls (Eurogrooves)

- "Wake Up" (2006) - cover of the Hilary Duff song
- "The Best of Both Worlds" (2006) - cover of the Hannah Montana song
- "Barbie Girl" feat. Sergio (2009) - cover of the Aqua song

Angelica (NRJ Mania)

- "Break My Heart Tonight" (2000)

Angie Davies (Time Records)

- "Jumpin' Up" (1996)
- "Without Your Love" (1997)
- "You" (1997)
- "Forever Now" (1998)
- "Never Ending Love" (1998)
- "Feel Like Heaven" (1998)

Angie Sweet (Eurogrooves)

- "Valentine's Day" (2009)

Apple (Eurogrooves)

- "Hey Boy" (2008)
- "Playboy" (2010)

Barbie (Time Records)

- "ParaPara Girl" (2006)
- "ParaPara Girl" (DJ Boss Remix) (2007)

Chip Chip

- "Close To Me" (1990)
- "Let Me Give You All My Love" (1990)

Deborah Haslam

- "Let Me Trouble" (1984)
- "Danger For Love" (1985)
- "Hot Stuff" (1987)

Desire' (Eurogrooves)

- "Take A Look In My Heart" (2010)

Divina (NRJ Mania)

- "Feeling In My Heart" (2000)

as Elena Ferretti

- "Wanda L'ultima Maitresse" (2008)
- "Ibera Le Schiave" (2009)
- "Pagate Blu" (2009)
- "Io Libera" (2011)
- "Easy Game" (2021)

Elisa (Vibration)

- "Tell Me The Reason Why" (1998)

Elisha (Time)

- "Soul Of The Night" (2000)

Erika (Time)

- "Fever & Music" (2007)

Eskimo

- "Jump" (1989)

Eurogrooves All Stars (Eurogrooves)

- "Super Eurobeat" (2009)

Eurosisters (Time)

- "Discomania" (1996)
- "Night N' Day Lady" (1997)
- "Ready 4 Your Lovely Game" (1999)
- "Dance All Night" (2000)
- "Honey for Love" (2002)

Firefly

- "Stay (No Time)"/"Feel Alright" (1984)

Gipsy & Queen (Time)

- "I Love U.S.A." (1988)
- "Plaze De Sol" (1988)
- "Love and Passion" (1989)
- "Megamix" (1989)
- "Call Me" (1990)
- "Touch Me, Feel Me, Kiss Me" (1990)
- "Black Bird" (1991)
- "Energy" (1991)
- "Love is a Dreamland" (1991)
- "Get Into Action" (1992)
- "Feel So Good" (1993)
- "Halloween Night" (1994)
- "We Can Change The World" (1994)
- "Energy Girls" (1995)
- "Queens Of Desire" (1996)
- "Made In Italy" (1996)
- "Boy Toy (You Are)" (1998)
- "Honey Honey Honey" (1999)

Giselle (Time)

- "If You Believe Me" (2001)
- "Season Of Love" (2002)

Go Go Girls (A-Beat C)

- "D.I.S.C.O." (1998)

Groove Twins (A-Beat C)

- "Dance Is Back" (1992)
- "I Love Your Body" (1993)
- "Only You" (1993)
- "Big Trouble" (1994)
- "Kick At My Heart" (1996)
- "Are You Ready To Dance" (1998)

Harmony (Time)

- "Forever Love" (1997)

Helena (Time)

- "Queen For A Day" 1990)
- "Take My Life" (1992)
- "Just An Illusion" (1992)
- "Burning Up" (1993)
- "With You" (1994)
- "Babe Follow Me" (1994)
- "Night Girl" (1995)
- "Lonely Night" (1996)
- "Melodies Of Love" (1996)
- "Waiting For You" (1996)
- "Ez Do Dance" (1997)
- "All My Life" (1997)
- "Waiting For You" (1997)
- "Now And Forever" (1997)
- "Future World" (1998)
- "Break My Heart" (1999)
- "My Life" (1999)
- "Fly" (1999)
- "Jingle Bells" (1999)
- "Love & Pride" (2000)
- "Love Is My Paradise" (2000)
- "Tell Me" (2000)
- "Sweet Dream" (2001)
- "Supersonic Lover" (2001)
- "Voices" (2001)
- "Broken Heart" (2001)
- "Hallelujah People" (2001)
- "Illusion" (2002)
- "Dedicated To The Moon" (2002)
- "Melodies Of Love" (Euro Acoustic Version) (2002)
- "Natural" (2002)
- "Lovely Tango" (2004)
- "Melodies And Rain" (2005)
- "Your Love Is Melody" (2006)
- "Lonely Night" (2006)
- "Spanish Affairs" (2007)
- "Melodies Of Love 2007" (2007)
- "Night Harmony" (2007)
- "Lonely Night 2011" (2011)

Hely (Eurogrooves)

- "Forever Sad" (2009)

High Connection (Time)

- "Live in Paradise" (1996)

High Frequency (Time)

- "Take Me To The Top" (1993)
- "One More Chance" (1994)
- "Wonder Why" (1994)
- "Japan Japan" (1995)
- "Love in Stereo" (1995)
- "Magic Japan" (1996)
- "Gimme Gimme Gimme" (1997)

Jane & Jilly (Polydor)

- "Honey" (1987)
- "Lay Lay Baby" (1990)

Karina (Time)

- "Don't Go Breaking My Heart" (1999)
- "Rudolph The Red Nose Reindeer" (1999)
- "Spin Me Round" (2000)
- "Sunshine Dance" (2000)
- "Superlover" (2002)
- "Rock Girl" (2003)

Kate & Karen (Time)

- "High On Emotion" (1993)
- "I Wanna Be Your Love" (1993)
- "Hold You" (1994)
- "Step Into My Heart" (1995)
- "Tell Me" (1996)
- "Macho Macho Man" (1998)
- "Crazy Girls" (1999)
- "Everyday" (1999)
- "The Power of Life" (2000)
- "Up N' Down" (2000)

Kim Loren (Time)

- "Happy News" (2001)

King & Queen (A-Beat C)

- "King And Queen" (1991)
- "Turbo Lover" (1992)
- "He Hey Dancing" (1993)
- "Bolero Rhapsody" (1994)
- "Para Para" (1994)
- "Biggest Love" (1995)
- "Season (Loving Now)" (1995)
- "Seventies" (1996)
- "I Love You Babe" (1997)
- "Up Side Down" (1997)
- "Dancing Queen" (1998)
- "1999" (1999)
- "King And Queen" (Healing Version) (2001)

King Kong & The D'Jungle Girls (Polydor)

- "Lies" (1988)
- "Walkie Talkie" (1989)
- "Boom Boom Dollars" (1989)

Les Blue Belles (Time)

- "Sugar Baby Love" (1990)
- "Gonna Get Away" (1990)
- "S.O.S." (1991)
- "Something Real" (1991)
- "Shine a Little Love" (1992)
- "Crazy Little Love" (1992)
- "Bang a Boomerang" (1993)
- "Don't Let Me Be Misunderstood" (1993)
- "Let's Feel The Night" (1994)
- "Knock Knock Knock" (1996)

Linda (Time)

- "Love Desire 2007" (2007)
- "Another Passion" (2008)

Linda Ross

- "Supernight" (2000)

Lisa Johnson (Time)

- "May Day, May Day" (1996)
- "Hey Superman" (1996)
- "Move Your Time" (1996)
- "Fantasy" (1997)
- "Saturday Night" (1998)
- "Night" (1998)
- "Passion Love and Fantasy" (1999)
- "Feel The Night" (1999)
- "Your Passion (Catch My Life)" (2000)

Lisa Ferrari (NRJ Mania)

- "Love In Music" (2000)
- "Why Don't You Love Me" (2001)

Los Mayos

- "Let's Start The Dance" (1987)

Love & Pride (Time Records)

- "Shake it Up" (1992)
- "Hot Hot Hot" (1993)
- "Shotgun Killer" (1993)
- "In The Line of Fire" (1995)
- "Hellraiser" (1994)
- "Run Run" (1996)
- "Love & Passion" (1997)
- "Move On" (2000)

Macho Gang (Macho Records/Time Records)

- "Dancer" (1987)
- "Naughty Boy" (1988)
- "Obladi Oblada" (1989)
- "When Somebody Loves Me" (1990)
- "Shoot Me Bang Bang" (1992)
- "Stepping Up" (1992)
- "Dance Around The World" (1993)
- "Dancing" (1993)
- "Never Ask Me Why" (1993)
- "Got To Move" (1994)
- "Try Me Baby" (1994)
- "Rock Rock Party" (1996)
- "Love Desire" (1997)
- "Super Magic Hero" (1998)
- "Lady Marmalade" (1999)
- "Go Superman" (2000)
- "1 2 3 4 Gimme Some More" (2000)
- "Boom Boom Party" (2001)
- "All My Love Tonight" (2002)

Maggie May

- "Tonight" (1997)

Magic Fire

- "Body Dancer" (1986)

Margaret (A-Beat C)

- "Rocking Romance" (1992)
- "Dance For Joy" (1993)
- "Hold On" (1993)
- "1-4-U" (1993)
- "Mine Is Your Love" (1993)
- "Stereo Love" (1994)
- "How Many Times" (1994)
- "Somebody Else" (1994)
- "Living Out" (1994)
- "You're In My Heart" (1994)
- "Revelation" (1995)
- "Renegade" (1995)
- "Stand Up (And Shout)" (1995)
- "I'm Your Lucky Star" (1996)
- "Tokyo, How Are You Tonite" (1996)
- "TV Show" (1996)
- "Waiting For Your Love" (1996)
- "Because The Night" (1996)
- "Blue Eyes" (1996)
- "Right Away" (1996)
- "Gonna Feel So Good" (1997)
- "Turn On The Light" (1997)
- "Far Away" (1997)
- "Chilly Man" (1998)
- "Mama" (1998)
- "Mine In Your Love" (Healing Remix) (2001)

Melody (Delta)

- "One More Night" (1996)
- "Endless Love" (1996)

Milk & Coffea (Asia Records)

- "Go Go Babe" (1998)

Moltocarina (Asia Records)

- "Voice of The Night" (1988)
- "Hold On Me" (1989)

Niki Niki (Time Records)

- "Boom Boom Baby (feat. Karen)" (1997)
- "1...2...3..." (1998)
- "Let Me Be Your Love" (1998)
- "Tell Me Why (I Love You) (1999)
- "Wonderland" (2000)
- "Summer" (2001)
- "Without U" (2003)

Olivia (Time Records)

- "Love Paradise" (1997)

Queen Of Times (A-Beat C)

- "Call Me" (1991)
- "Family" (1991)
- "Love Love" (1992)
- "Holiday" (1992)
- "So Much In Love" (1994)
- "Ever And Ever" (1994)
- "Why?" (1994)
- "Nothing' Gonna Stop Me Tonite" (1994)
- "Do Me Right" (1995)
- "First Class Love" (1995)
- "I Need A Change" (1995)
- "So Long" (1995)
- "One More Chance" (1995)
- "Deep And Strong" (1996)
- "One Of These Nights" (1997)
- "Feeling Free" (1997)
- "Now Is The Time" (1997)
- "Give It Up" (1998)
- "If I Only Knew" (1999)

Radiorama

- "Vampires" (1986)

Rose (Time Records)

- "Fairy-Tale" (1985)
- "Make Me Up" (1987)
- "I Wanna Be Your Love" (1988)
- "Perfect Time" (1989)
- "Never Fall In Love Again" (1992)
- "Matter Of Feeling" (1992)
- "Love Is Like Paradise" (1993)
- "Mister Right" (1994)
- "Celebrate" (1995)
- "Bad Love" (1996)
- "Hold On" (1996)
- "Take My Heart" (1996)
- "Open Up Your Heart (Today)" (1996)
- "Come On Come Over" (1997)
- "Eternally (You Belong To Me)" (1997)
- "Dream" (1998)
- "Love And Destiny" (1998)
- "Doctor Of My Heart" (1998)
- "Don't Stop My Fire" (1999)
- "Honey And Heart" (1999)
- "World Of Fantasy" (1999)
- "Santa Claus is Coming To Town" (1999)
- "Wonderdul Love" (2000)
- "A Song For You" (2000)
- "Goodbye Goodbye" (2000)
- "Like A Children" (2000)
- "You And Me" (2000)
- "Especially For You" (2001)
- "Prayer In The Dark" (2001)
- "Spanish Melody" (2001)
- "Rainy Days" (2002)
- "Everytime Is Love" (2002)
- "Histoire D'Amour" (2003)
- "This Is My Song (For You)" (2003)
- "Supernatural" (2004)
- "It's Fine" (2005)
- "Magic Rainbow" (2006)
- "Santa Claus Lives In Tokyo" (2006)
- "Merry X-Mas" (2007)
- "Over The Sky" (2007)

Sara (Asia Records)

- "The Beat Of The Night" (1989)
- "Time Goes On" (1989)
- "Love Is Like A Replay" (1990)

Sophie (Time Records)

- "My World" (1989)
- "Soft Time" (1989)
- "Face To Face" (1989)
- "Tonite Tonite" (1989)
- "Rapture" (1989)
- "Lovely Day" (1989)
- "Tell Me Why" (1990)
- "Soft Time" (Red Monster Remix) (1990)
- "Love Never Slipping Away" (1991)
- "Dial My Number" (1991)
- "Only Wanna Be With You" (1991)
- "Talk To Me" (1991)
- "Where Do We Go" (1991)
- "The Promise You Made" (1991)
- "Stop The Music" (1992)
- "The Only Reason" (1992)
- "Treat Me Right" (1992)
- "Hold Me" (1993)
- "Are You Ready To Fly" (1993)
- "Like An Angel" (1994)
- "It's Rainy Day" (1995)
- "Stop The Music" (Y. & Co. Remix) (1995)
- "Music" (1996)
- "Make It Feel Good" (1996)
- "White Christmas" (1996)
- "Over 'N' Over" (1997)
- "Lonely Love" (1998)
- "Shoobee Doo Bee Doo" (1998)
- "In The Name Of Love" (1998)
- "Only 4 Your Love" (1998)
- "Don't You (Forget About My Love)" (1999)
- "Love Is Always On My Mind" (1999)
- "Ah L'Amour" (2000)
- "All Of My Life" (2000)
- "Lovely Passion" (2002)
- "Waiting For The Sun" (2002)
- "Tell Me Why" (Remake) (2002)
- "Love Devotion & Surrender" (2003)
- "Magic Time" (2004)
- "Touch Me Touch Me" (2005)
- "Eternal Symphony" (2005)
- "My World 2006" (2006)
- "Drive In The Night" (2006)

Stars

- "Funkytown Medley: Let's All Chant" (1987)

Time All Stars/Time Acoustic Trio (Time Records)

- "Christmas Time" (1995)
- "Happy X'Mas, Merry X'Mas" (1996)
- "Ring The Bells" (1996)
- "Christmas in Tokyo" (1998)
- "Tonight is Christmas" (2001)
- "Melodies of Love" (Acoustic) (2001)
- "150" (2004)

Tom Cat

- "Black Jack" (1988)

Torias

- "A-yo Mexico" (1983)

Valentina (A-Beat C)

- "Never Let You Say Goodbye" (1991)
- "Honey" (1991)
- "Do You Know" (1992)
- "Waste My Time" (1992)
- "Lovin' Inside" (1992)
- "Occasional Dream" (1992)
- "Love & Passion" (1993)
- "Brown Brown Sugar" (1993)
- "Harmony" (1994)
- "Moonlight Shadows" (1994)
- "Tonite" (1994)
- "Wake Up Honey" (1994)
- "I Know" (1994)
- "Shake Me Up" (1994)
- "A Lotta Fantasy" (1995)
- "I'm In Love With You" (1995)
- "Tomorrow" (1995)
- "Sleep In Your Arms" (1995)
- "Shake Me Up" (Midi Wave Remix) (1995)
- "That You Want" (1995)
- "Your Love" (1995)
- "I Love Spaghetti" (1996)
- "Breakfast In Bed" (1996)
- "Cha Cha Cha" (1996)
- "Question" (1996)
- "I Just Called To Say I Love You" (1996)
- "Where Is The Happiness" (1996)
- "Satellite Love" (1997)
- "Freedom" (1997)
- "Purify Your Love" (1998)
- "Don't Leave Me This Way" (1998)
- "Standing Ovation" (1998)
- "Harmony" (Midi-Wave Remix) (1998)
- "Baby Don't Worry" (1998)
- "I Love You Like You Are" (1999)
- "Don't Fly Away" (2000)
- "Don't Stop The Music" (2000)
- "I Wanna Live" (2000)
- "The Colour Of My Love" (2001)
- "Mr. Lover" (2001)
- "'Cause I Love You" (2001)
- "Broken Illusion" (2001)
- "Trust Me Now" (2002)
- "Wonder" (2002)

Vanessa (Time Records)

- "You Light My Fantasy" (2000)
- "The Final Countdown" (2000)
- "Running In The Dark" (2001)
- "Take Your Time" (2001)
- "Memories And Melodies" (2002)
- "Live In Me" (2002)
- "If One More Day" (2003)
- "Saturday Morning" (2004)
- "Stand Up" (2005)
- "I'm Ready" (2007)
- "Take It Easy" (2008)
- "Love And Pasion 2008" (2008)

Vanity (Time Records)

- "Take A Look In My Heart" (2007)

Veronique (Time Records)

- "Dream On Violin" (1984)
- "Night Style" (1985)

Victoria (Time Records)

- "I Don't Wanna Let You Go" (1992)
- "For You" (1992)
- "Give Me The Night" (1993)
- "Happy Song" (1994)
- "Playtime" (1994)
- "Hi-Dee-Ho" (1995)
- "Born To Be Your Angel" (1996)
- "Sexy Toy (Come And Try Me)" (1996)
- "Please Don't Go" (1997)
- "Stay" (1998)
- "Sunshine Dance" (1999)
- "Love Rhapsody" (2000)

== See also ==
- List of Eurobeat artists
