= J-Euro Best =

Compilation album by various artists
- Released: January 11, 2001
- Genre: Electronic (Hi-NRG)
- Label: Avex Trax
- Producer: Max Matsuura

J-Euro Best is a compilation album, consisting of recordings by various Avex artists produced and/or remixed by various music producers mostly those of eurobeat from Italy, released in 2001 by Avex Trax.

As an album in the Super Eurobeat Presents : J-Euro series, J-Euro Best contained 14 tracks including ones sung by prominent Avex artists such as Ayumi Hamasaki, MAX and Every Little Thing.

J-Euro Best can be considered a greatest hits album, as the album consists of many smash hits in the 2000 "J-Euro" boom in the para para scene.

== Track listing ==
1. Boys & Girls (A Eurobeat Mix) – Ayumi Hamasaki
2. Ginga No Chikai (Eurobeat Mix) – MAX
3. Survival Dance (No No Cry More) (Eurobeat Mix) – TRF
4. Break Out! (Eurobeat Mix) – Nanase Aikawa
5. Pray (Eurobeat Mix) – Every Little Thing
6. Blazin' Beat (Eurobeat Mix) – Move
7. Heartbeat – Passion 2000
8. Private Wars (Euro Mix) – Dream
9. Aishiattemasu (New Generation Mix) – Key-A-Kiss
10. No.1 (Kagayake Otome) (DJ Shu's Light Mix3) – Tokyo Purin
11. Deluxe (Eurobeat Mix) – Key-A-Kiss
12. Fly High (Euro-Power Mix) – Ayumi Hamasaki
13. Give Me A Shake (Euro-Power Mix) – MAX
14. Freedom (Global Extended Mix) – Globe
