= Eurobeat =

Music genre

- Super Eurobeat Vol. 250 cover art
- Stylistic origins: Hi-NRG; Italo disco (Note: Italy is a Eurobeat "Mecca" to either variant of Eurobeat; first produced in Italy and West Germany.); dance-pop; synth-rock
- Cultural origins: British Eurobeat: Mid 1980s, United Kingdom; Contemporary Eurobeat: Late 1980s, Italy, West Germany and Japan

Fusion genres
- J-pop

Regional scenes
- United Kingdom; Italy; Japan; Germany

Other topics
- J-Euro; Para Para; synthwave; Stock Aitken Waterman

Eurobeat refers to two styles of dance music that originated in Europe: one is a British variant of Italian Eurodisco-influenced dance-pop, and the other is a hi-NRG-driven form of Italo disco. The former was developed in the 1980s, while the latter was developed starting from the early 1990s and continuing in the following decades, distancing itself from its Italo disco origins as time went on.

Producer trio Stock Aitken Waterman and pop band Dead or Alive made Eurobeat music more popular in the United States and Southeast Asia, where Eurobeat was historically marketed as hi-NRG (pronounced as "high energy"). For a short while, it also shared this term with Italo disco.

== Overview ==
In the late 1970s, Eurodisco musicians such as Silver Convention and Donna Summer were popular in America.

In the 1980s, a highly polished production with "musical simplicity" at its core. An average British Eurobeat song took very little time to complete. Bananarama's "Venus" and Mel & Kim's "Showing Out (Get Fresh at the Weekend)" were said to be completed in a day, according to Pete Waterman of Stock Aitken Waterman.

In the mid-1980s, Japanese label Alfa Music offered a deal with Italo disco singer, songwriter and producer Mauro Farina in search for music to target to Japanese discoteques which were very few and had limited access to suitable dance music.

In 1990, then small Japanese import record shop Avex, following expansion plans, bought the Super Eurobeat compilation series, which had its first volume that same year, and partnered with newborn Italian label A-Beat-C.

A-Beat-C was the first label to progressively detach the term Eurobeat from being synonymous with Italo disco in Japan, establishing it as a distinct genre.

"Speedway"
Beginning (0:00-0:31) → riff in Niko's "Speedway", from Super Eurobeat Vol. 101 (released in 2000)

"Boom Boom Fire"
Megamix-beginning → riff [then cut to] chorus → riff in D.Essex's "Boom Boom Fire" (produced in 1997), from Super Eurobeat Vol. 140 (released in 2003)

Italian Eurobeat lyrics have varying degrees of complexity and themes, and are accompanied by very complex melodies. Many songs produced starting in the mid-1990s feature electric guitars throughout the song, along with a thunderous, highly technical synthesizer riff (also known as the sabi), which can be composed of up to 20 audio tracks layered together. The sabi is heard after the introduction and after the chorus. Songs usually repeat the verse, bridge, and chorus multiple times during the song, every time with a different arrangement, keeping the listener eager to discover how the next iteration is gonna be. The introduction can resemble an instrumental rendition of the verse, bridge, or chorus, while the riff can bear close resemblance to an instrumental version of the chorus. The general structure of a Eurobeat song is as follows:

beginning (intro) → sabi → A melo (verse) → B melo (bridge) → chorus → sabi → ending

— The intro is the introduction into the song, the riff (also known as the sabi) is the musical part without voices. The A melo, or a-melody is any verse in the song independent of lyrics, the B melo is the bridge of the song, and there is a vocal chorus (also known as C Melo or c-melody). There are always (expect for rare cases) 2 verse → bridge → chorus progressions with different lyrics in the 2 verses

Eurobeat song artists are seldom called by the real name of the singer(s), instead preferring aliases. This practice started in the Italo disco scene where the very low number of available performers forced the authors to came up with multiple names for everyone to give the impression of a bigger team on compilations.

With the musicians' transition to Eurobeat, the practice remained alive. It is common to see singers performing under different aliases (for example Clara Moroni having sung under aliases such as Cherry, Denise, Vicky Vale and many more) and aliases being performed by different singers in different time periods (for example the Max Coveri alias was first used by Mauro Farina, then by Massimo Brancaccio, then by Roberto Gabrielli, then by Maurizio De Jorio and more recently by Corrado Beretta). The very few instances where songs have been released under the real name of the singer happened with an equally limited amount of singers such as Annerley Gordon (credited with her full name as well as similar variations like A. Gordon), Gino Caria and Elena Ferretti, all of which also sung under multiple aliases.

Multiple aliases used by the same singer(s) can also be used to separate different styles. For example, both Fastway and Dusty are used by Ennio Zanini but the former focusses on a more typical Eurobeat sound, while the latter is more rock–oriented

== Use of the term ==
British record producer Ian Levine's Eastbound Expressway, released the single "You're a Beat" in recognition of the slower tempo of hi-NRG music emerging from Europe. Many European acts managed to break through under this new recognition, namely the likes of Modern Talking, Bad Boys Blue, Taffy, and Spagna. The term "Eurobeat" was subsequently used commercially to describe the Stock Aitken Waterman–produced hits by Dead or Alive, Bananarama, Jason Donovan, Sonia, and Kylie Minogue which were heavily based on the British experience with Italo disco. During 1986–1988, it was used for specific Italian 1980s Eurodisco imports, such as Sabrina Salerno, Spagna, and Baltimora but was also used in the United States as a catch-all term for UK-based dance and electropop groups of the time such as Pet Shop Boys, purported to have a "European beat", hence Eurobeat. By 1989, with the advent of Eurodance and Euro house, the term was dropped completely in the UK.

In Japan, the term Eurobeat was used to refer to Italo disco imports from Italy by the mid-1980s after Japanese label Alfa Music made a deal with Italo disco singer, songwriter and producer Mauro Farina. The name itself came from Farina's answer to a question by an Alfa spokesperson. In English, the spokesperson asked what genre the songs Alfa were interested in belonged to. Because the songs they were interested in were ones Farina's team believed would not sell well in Italy, he did not have an answer. Considering the that he was located in Europe and that the word beat accurately described the style of these songs, he improvised the name Eurobeat. Answering the spokesperson with that's Eurobeat, which would go on to be the name of the That's Eurobeat compilation series.

== History ==
=== United Kingdom ===
"It's a great hybrid with Motown-style lyrics, an Italian-style melody, and a Eurobeat. It sounds really great on the radio."

— Waterman (1986) on Bananarama "I Heard a Rumour".

The trio of British record producers, songwriters, and former DJs Mike Stock, Matt Aitken, and Pete Waterman were involved in the British underground club culture, encountering the Black American soul music-focused scene called Northern Soul, Italian pop-Eurodisco, and sped-up Motown Sound-inspired tracks. As underground record producers, they sought to recapture the "nostalgia" of Motown Sound with a hint of campy playfulness where the simplicity of musical structures, like in Italian disco, was preferred. This musical formula was proven to be successful enough to be capitalized on as they had a string of top 10 UK hits in the 1980s to the point of their version of Eurobeat becoming synonymous with British pop music as a whole.

Pete Burns of Dead or Alive regularly fought the production team over "[having to adhere] to their production methods and concepts" which SAW were "quite firm about". Burns went on making a next album, produced by Burns and Dead or Alive drummer Steve Coy, without them, called Nude. Epic (licensed by Sony Europe) was reluctant about releasing the album but it turned out to be so successful in Japan that it was awarded the Japan Record Award Grand Prix for Best International Album of 1989 in the 'Pop' or 'Popular' Category.

=== Italy and Japan ===
"Three labels have been with us for years now, and they believed in us. Without them, we could not have made it happen."

— Avex Trax's Haji Taniguchi (2000)

Meanwhile, in Japan starting in the mid-1980s, the term "Eurobeat" was applied to all Italo disco music imports. That sound became the soundtrack of the at the time very niche Para Para nightclub culture, which has existed since the early 1980s. Japan experienced Italo disco through the success of the West German group Arabesque, which broke up in 1984. This did not prevent the release of two Italo disco-sounding singles in 1985 and 1986, produced and mixed by Michael Cretu (of Enigma). The later solo success of Arabesque's lead singer Sandra further introduced this sound to Japan. This attracted the attention of many Italo disco producers (mostly Italians and Germans), though by the late 1980s the West Germans had faded out of Italo disco and focused on more popular scenes, mainly trance. At this time Italian singer, songwriter and producer Mauro Farina entered the Japanese scene by introducing the term Eurobeat and selling part of his team's catalog to the Japanese label Alfa Music.

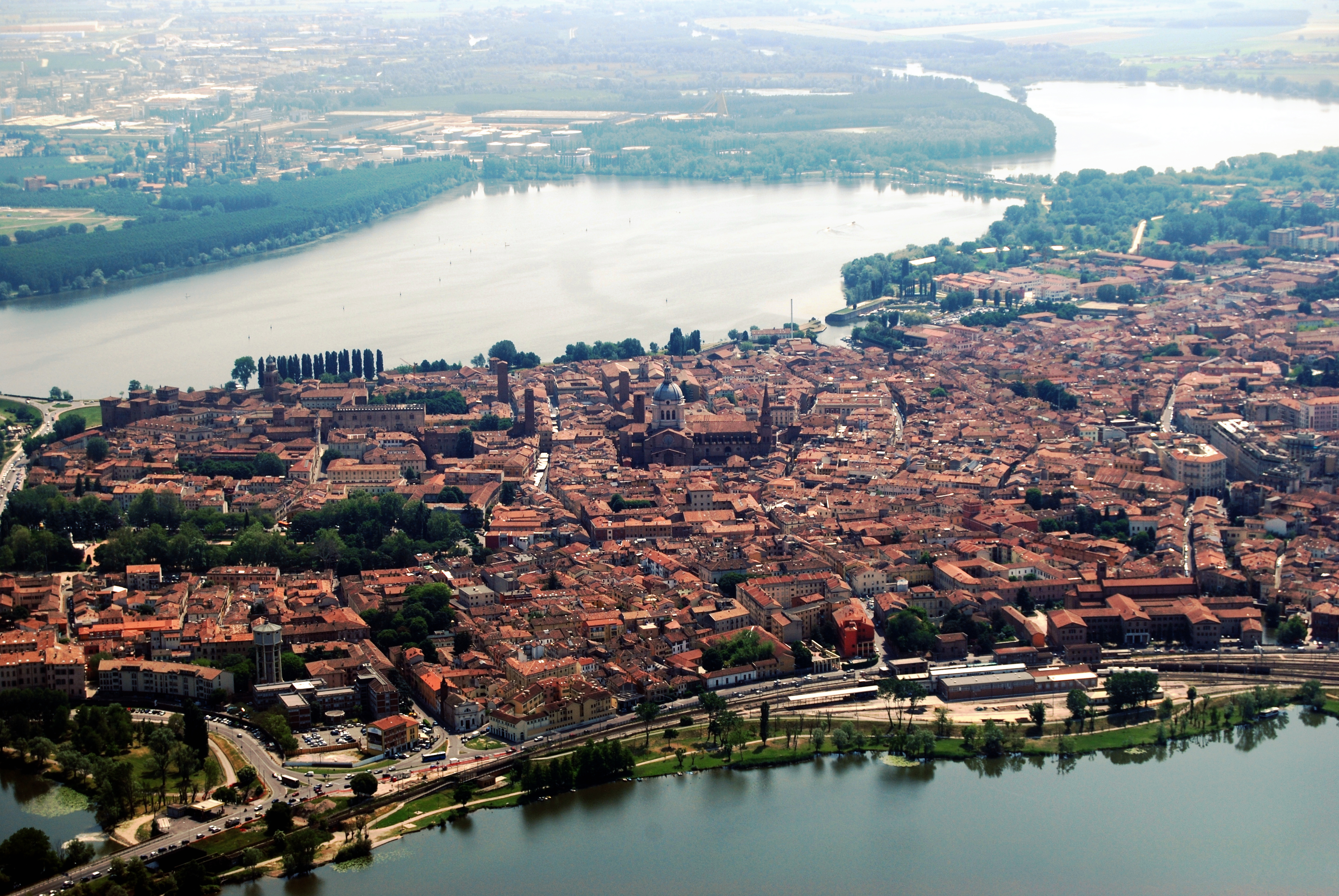
The majority of Italian Eurobeat labels have been based in Northern Italy, in cities such as Lugagnano, Brescia and Mantua (pictured)

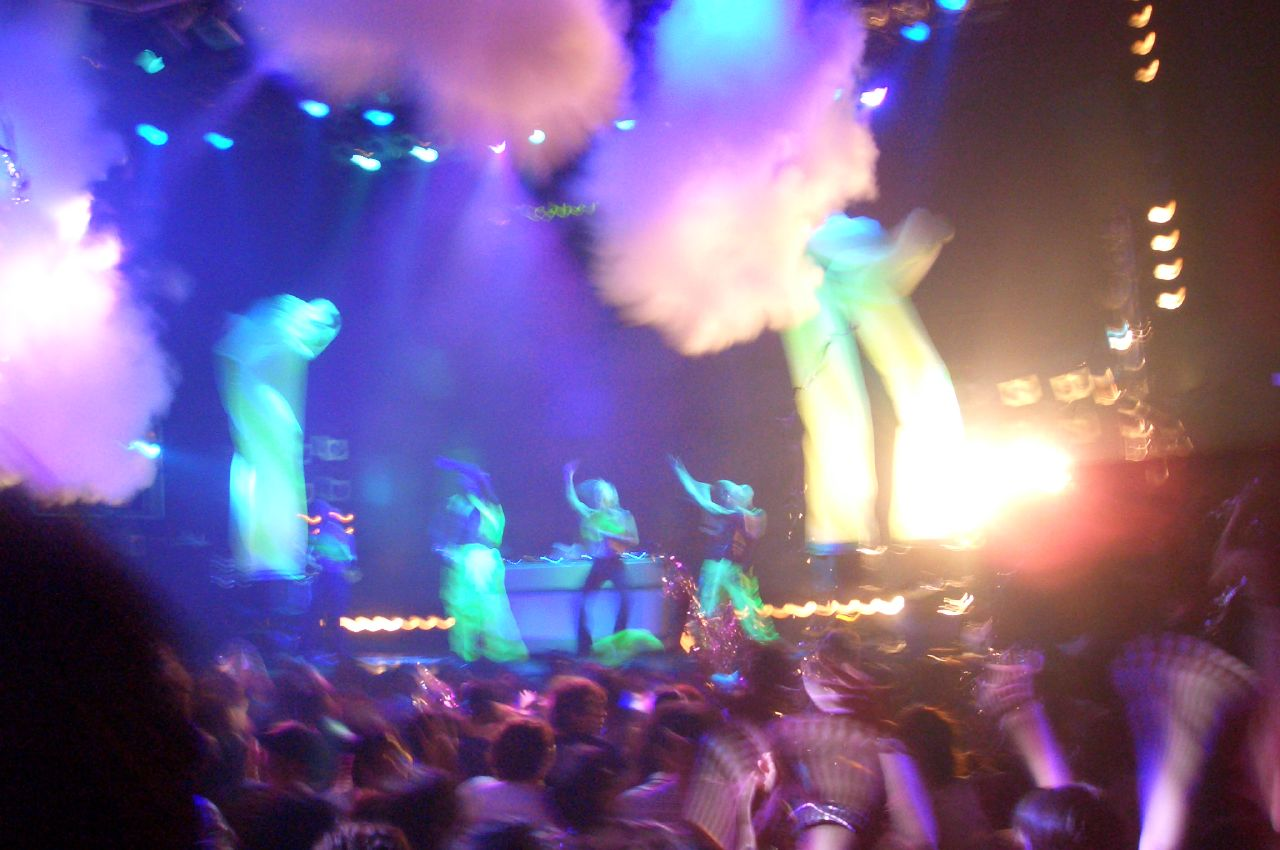
Velfarre, a discotheque located in Tokyo, was considered a mecca of Eurobeat during the 1990s and 2000s.

The Japanese Para Para dance culture is highly influenced and closely related by Eurobeat. In 1990, then small Japanese import record shop Avex, following expansion plans, partnered with newborn Italian label A-Beat-C, founded the same year by Giancarlo Pasquini and Alberto Contini after a meeting at Contini's house with the two, along with Alessandra Mirka Gatti, and Avex founders Max Matsuura and Tom Yoda in which it was decided that Avex would restart, in the end of 1990, the Super Eurobeat compilation, which was beforehand an Italo disco–based CD series released by the label Beat Freak in the same year.

With A-Beat-C, Time Records and Delta (the latter 2 would join Avex's Super Eurobeat in the following years) the term Eurobeat progressively became its own district genre abandoning the Italo disco synonym definition.

The new Super Eurobeat compilation saw instant success and ignited an explosion of Eurobeat's popularity in Japan.

Eurobeat's sound contains certain instruments that recur throughout most of the genre: a sequenced octave bass, the energetic and heavy use of synths, distinctive brass and harp sounds, and tight, rhythmic percussions in the background, though some songs may be more experimental than others, for example by including distinctively acoustic instruments such as acoustic guitars. The vast majority of sounds are custom-made by the producers and are not stock presets.

Starting in the mid-1990s, electric guitars also started to become more common with varying degrees of sonic presence in the song. From the mid-1990s to the early 2000s, Jennifer Batten worked as composer and electric guitarist with Giancarlo Pasquini and his team at A-Beat-C.

Megamix-intro of "I Wanna Dance"
"I Wanna Dance", Eurobeat song by Domino, from Super Eurobeat Vol. 90 Anniversary

The 1996 video game Sega Touring Car Championship first featured Eurobeat as racing music. The 1998 anime series Initial D, based on the manga by Shuichi Shigeno, uses highly-energetic Eurobeat music regularly in its episodes during racing scenes between the characters to accompany the adrenaline of the races, and because of this a narrow set of Eurobeat has come to the attention of some anime fans outside Japan. The series, as well as the Arcade Stage video games by Sega, use a large playlist of Eurobeat songs (for example, the trio of "Deja Vu" by Dave Rodgers, from Second Stage "Running in the 90s" by Max Coveri, from First Stage, Arcade Stage 2 and Special Stage and "Gas Gas Gas" by Manuel from Fifth Stage and Arcade Stage 5; all of which later became internet memes where these songs are played with video footage of rapidly moving objects or people). There are also some Eurobeat songs based on the series itself, such as "Takumi" by Neo, "Speed Car" by D-Team from Fourth Stage, Arcade Stage 4 and Extreme Stage and "DDD Initial D (My Car is Fantasy)" by Mega NRG Man from Fifth Stage. Initial D's successor, MF Ghost, the 2023 anime uses Eurobeat as background music in the same way as its predecessor. The anime One Piece used eurobeat in their 2nd Anime Opening and on their short film called Jango's Dance Carnival on 2001. In 2003, an anime called Dear Boys, which focuses on basketball, also features Eurobeat during basketball game sequences. In 2005, Ichigo 100% used eurobeat on the Anime Ending Credits.

In 1998, Bemani, a branch of the video game company Konami, made a hit video dance machine, Dance Dance Revolution. The game acquired Eurobeat songs from the Dancemania compilation series published by Toshiba EMI. Though there was not much Eurobeat from 2006's SuperNOVA on, the series still features some tracks as of 2021. Other music games in Konami's lineup feature a large number of Eurobeat tracks, including Beatmania, Beatmania IIDX, jubeat, and many more. The popularity of the genre also led Konami to create a Para Para game, ParaParaParadise, though it was less successful than their other series.

Wangan Midnight the Movie, which was a 2009 film adaptation of the manga and anime series of the same name, features some Eurobeat songs, though only in some scenes as it has an original score playing through race sequences. Similarly, the Wangan Midnight Maximum Tune arcade games by Namco feature a trance soundtrack, in a similar way to how Initial D has Eurobeat.

== J-Euro ==
Types of music called "J-Euro" (Japanese Eurobeat) include:

- Eurobeat songs made in Italy, covered by Japanese artists with Japanese lyrics. This type of "J-Euro" appeared first in the early 1990s. Notable artists of this type of "J-Euro" have included MAX, D&D, V6, Dream, and Namie Amuro.

"You (Aggressive Mix)" by Ayumi Hamasaki
Remixed by Bratt Sinclaire, from Ayu-ro Mix

- J-pop songs made in Japan, remixed in the style of Eurobeat by Italian Eurobeat producers. This type of "J-Euro" appeared first on the 1999 issue of Super Eurobeat, Vol. 100, with several tracks of this type of "J-Euro" by MAX, Every Little Thing, and Ayumi Hamasaki. This type of "J-Euro" has been popular in the para para scene since around 2000. Avex Trax launched the Super Eurobeat Presents : J-Euro series in 2000. This series included Ayu-ro Mix 1, 2 and 3, plus a fourth remix album missing the "Super Eurobeat" tag featuring Ayumi Hamasaki, Euro Every Little Thing featuring Every Little Thing, Hyper Euro MAX featuring MAX, Euro global featuring globe, Euro Dream Land featuring Dream, J-Euro Best, J-Euro Non-Stop Best, etc.
- Eurobeat songs made in Japan, and sung by Japanese artists themselves. This type of Eurobeat has always been present since the 2000s, but only started to gain attention once the para para scene began promoting songs in this style. Most songs are anime remixes or J-pop covers, which has led to some calling it an anime boom. Eurobeat labels that showcase this type of J-Euro are A-One, Akiba Koubou INC/Akiba Records, Eurobeat Union, Fantasy Dance Tracks, Plum Music, Sound Holic, SuganoMusic, TTL Sound, Takanashi Koubou and more.

=== Para Para ===
One of the dance moves Eurobeat spawned was para para (パラパラ), a type of Eurobeat music-inspired Japanese youth social dance performed in unison.

== See also ==
- List of Eurobeat artists
- Super Eurobeat
- Eurobeat Disney
- Initial D
- Italo disco
