= Bratt Sinclaire =

Italian Eurobeat/Italo disco producer (born 1967)

- Born: Andrea Leonardi; 26 April 1967 (age 59); Milan, Italy
- Genres: Italo disco; Eurobeat
- Instruments: Synthesizer; electric guitar
- Years active: 1990–present
- Label: SinclaireStyle
- Website: www.sinclairestyle.net

Bratt Sinclaire (born Andrea Leonardi, 26 April 1967) is an Italian Eurobeat/Italo disco producer. He has produced a countless number of tracks for the Super Eurobeat series, the world's longest-running series of dance compilation albums. He is the founder and owner of the dance music record label SinclaireStyle and one of the three co-founders of Delta, one of the most well-known Eurobeat record labels.

== Background and career ==
"Night of Fire"
Sinclaire's work "Night of Fire" by Niko, from Super Eurobeat Vol. 140 Anniversary

Bratt Sinclaire was born on 26 April 1967 in Milan, Italy. He became interested in music at a young age, and after studying music theory he later went on to teach it. Originally, Sinclaire wanted to start a hard rock band, but was later drawn into electronic music.

According to the website of his current label SinclaireStyle, Sinclaire began being involved in the Eurobeat scene in 1990, when he joined the label A-Beat-C as a freelance producer. He was present when the label established a long-term partnership with Japanese label Avex Trax, thus pushing the distinct genre into the international market. Frequent collaboration with A-Beat-C's founder Alberto Contini led to Sinclaire composing over 200 tracks over the span of five years. He made his first SEB appearance in 1991 on Super Eurobeat Vol. 17 with the track, "Up And Down" (Extended Version), co-written with Contini. He subsequently appeared on Super Eurobeat Vol. 17 along with several other Italo disco artists, including Dave Rodgers.

In 1995, Sinclaire grew tired of working as a freelancer and co-founded Delta with musicians Laurent Newfield and Clara Moroni. The success of Delta during this time was more or less equally measurable to the A-Beat-C-Avex Trax partnership, as artists from both of these featured on Super Eurobeat. Sinclaire estimates that he made at least 280 different tracks during the next 10-year period, during this he produced (with vocal collaboration from Maurizio De Jorio under the alias "Niko") the award-winning track "Night of Fire", which was awarded the "Gold Album of the Year", "Animated Album of the Year" and the "Special Product of the Year" by the Recording Industry Association of Japan in 2000. As well as this, it has become one of the most popular themes in the para para scene, and has been covered by several Japanese artists including Dream and Hinoi Team. The song has been prominently featured on two of their works, one being Dream's 2000 maxi single "Night of Fire" and the other being Hinoi Team feat. Koricky's 2005 DVD single "Night of Fire"/"Play with The Numbers".

In 2006, Sinclaire took a year-long hiatus from production to move to Lecco, Italy. On January 1, 2008, he established his current label, SinclaireStyle. He regularly collaborates with De Jorio at SinclaireStyle's studio in Italy. Other artists include Bon, Les, Ana, Roberta, Nathalie, Chai, and Tora (these names are aliases).

Aside from the main SEB series, he has also produced tracks for the SEB Presents albums featuring famous Japanese artists such as Ayumi Hamasaki and Every Little Thing. Hamasaki's 2000 album Ayu-ro Mix 1 reached #2 on Oricon's album chart and ranked #38 on the 2000 yearly best-selling album chart with 649,650 copies sold. Ayu-ro Mix 2 reached #1 and ranked #51 with 433,030 copies sold. Euro Every Little Thing reached #3. Other SEB Presents issues he was involved with include Euro "Dream" Land, Dah! Dah! Dah! Boy Meets Girl With TRF, Initial D Super Euro Best, and J-Euro Non-Stop Best.
