= Hiroko Anzai =

Japanese actress, model and gravure idol (born 1979)

- Born: February 9, 1979 (age 46); Kanagawa, Japan
- Occupation(s): Actress, Model
- Height: 1.57 m (5 ft 2 in)

Hiroko Anzai (安西 ひろこ, Anzai Hiroko) (born February 9, 1979, in Kanagawa, Japan) is a Japanese actress, model and gravure idol, who has appeared in various magazines and photo albums.

Her first photo album was released in 1996 and titled Mystic. Fuji TV selected Hiroko as its Visual Queen of 1998. She has body measurements of 89-62-90 cm, and stands 1.57 m tall.

== Life and career ==
After graduating from junior high school in Sagamihara, Kanagawa, Anzai moved to Tokyo to attend Tsurukawa High School. Since the school does not allow students to appear in television commercials, however she left Tsurukawa to attend North Toshima High School, where she completed her studies.

In 1996 Anzai made her show business debut as a gravure idol, despite being one year short of the Japanese age of majority. For this reason, she actually attended the coming of age ceremony twice. Several years later she confessed to having lied about her age during an appearance on the Japanese television variety program Downtown DX. Host Masatoshi Hamada joked, "Just one (year) is ok, isn't it?" In fact the misrepresentation was considered to be a relatively minor offense, and in the end the confession caused relatively little uproar.

During the late 1990s Anzai published several photo collections and made frequent appearances on number of television variety shows, but in 1999 she made the switch from gravure idol to fashion model, appearing in teen magazines. Together with popular singer Ayumi Hamasaki, Anzai gained popularity among junior and senior high school students as a fashion leader. She made her music debut with a CD released by Avex Group in 2000, featuring appearances by Namie Amuro, MAX, and V6, and produced by Eurobeat producer Dave Rodgers. She has also appeared as an actress on television dramas.

Anzai's interests include judo and swimming. During junior high, she competed in the Kanagawa Prefecture judo tournament, where she finished in the top eight. She has been known to throw fellow guests over her shoulder during appearances on variety programs, and often speaks on talk shows about the rigor of her training during junior high school.

In November 2007 it was reported that Anzai's relationship with Kaname Kawabata of the band CHEMISTRY had ended. By that time, Anzai had largely retreated from show business, though she did serve as spokesperson for the foreign brands import shop Toko Pacific.

Anzai returned to show business in September 2008 when she appeared in the magazine Blenda Black. In the magazine, she described in detail both her work and her mental state during the previous seven years.

In March 2009 Anzai began writing a blog. In May of that year she appeared in the television program Jabekuri 007 (Nippon Television) after a long absence from the medium.

== Media appearances ==
Television dramas

- The Gift (1997, Fuji Television)
- Days (1998, Fuji Television)
- Kyu-kyu heart jiryou shitsu (1999, Kansai Telecasting Corporation)
- Nijuu-sai no kekkon (2000, Tokyo Broadcasting System)
- Star no koi (2001, Fuji Television)

Variety programs

- BiKiNi (October 1997-September 1998, TV Tokyo)
- Ucchan Nanchan no homura no challenger, kore ga dekitara 1,000,000 yen!! (April 1998-March 2000, TV Asahi)
- Gogoichi (April–September 1998, Fuji Television)
- Koi no Tune-up!! (October 1998-September 1999, Nippon Television)
- Tokusou TV! Gaburincho (October 1998-March 2001, TV Asahi)
- Kato/Ken/Takeshi no Sekimatsu Special!! (1998, Fuji Television)
- Gravure no bishoujo (MONDO21)
- Jabekuri 007 (2009, Nippon Television)

Commercials

- NTT Docomo Hokkaido
- TuKa Cellular Tokyo
- Shiseido
- Coca-Cola Japan
- Lotte Yukimi Daifuku
- ARAX Notion Pure
- Myojyo Shokuhin Ichihara-chan Ramen
- Toshiba
- Japan Red Cross
- Tokyo-to Jouhi Seikatsu Center

Films

- Nagisa no Shindobaddo (1995, Toho)
- Kishiwada Shonen Gurentai Yakyu Dan (2000)

Photo collections

- Mystic (1997) ISBN 978-4-7542-1175-2
- Heroine (1998) ISBN 978-4-592-73150-4
- Embrace (1998) ISBN 978-4-8470-2502-0
- Pleasure blue (1999) ISBN 978-4-8211-2264-6
- Privates (1999) ISBN 978-4-88618-201-2
- Saigo no Ao (2000) ISBN 978-4-7648-1909-2

Books

- Happy Girlie (2000) ISBN 978-4-391-61154-0
- Fashion Book AF (2001) ISBN 978-4-8124-0735-6
- R (2001) ISBN 978-4-06-336346-3

Slide collections

- Hiroko Anzai '97 No.1 Bishojo Idol(1997, VHS)
- Kono Mune wo Anata ni (1997, VHS)
- Hi! Roco & Roco Fuji Television Visual Queen of the Year (1998, VHS)
- Final Beauty Anzai Hiroko (1999, VHS and DVD)
- Feel in Italy (2001, DVD)
- ЯESOLUTION (2001, DVD)

== Music ==
Singles

- True Love (2000)
- Necessary (2001)
- Andersen (2001)
- Let You Go (2001)

Album

- ЯEAL (2001)

DVD

- RESOLUTION (2001)
