= Kana Tachibana =

Japanese pop singer (born 1985)

Kana Tachibana 橘 佳奈
- Born: 20 October 1985 (age 41); Higashiōsaka, Japan
- Genres: Anison; Japanese pop
- Occupations: Artist; Dancer; Musician; Singer
- Instrument: Vocals
- Years active: 2000–present
- Labels: Avex Trax (2000–2007); Rhythm Zone (2008–2010); TOKYO(w)REC(k)ORDS (2015–present)
- Formerly of: Dream
- Website: tachibana-kana.com

Japanese name
- Kanji: 橘 佳奈
- Hiragana: たちばな かな
- Katakana: タチバナ カナ
Transcriptions
- Romanization: Tachibana Kana

Kana Tachibana (橘 佳奈, Tachibana Kana; born 20 October 1985) is a Japanese pop singer. She is notable as one of the original member of pop girl group Dream along with Mai Matsumuro and Yu Hasebe. She is currently a soloist singer under TOKYO (W) REC(k)ORDS.

== Career ==
Tachibana was originally one of the first three members of dream, chosen through a nationwide talent search held by Avex Trax in 2000. When lead singer Mai Matsumuro left the group, Tachibana was pronounced leader of the newly reformed eight-member group. She remained a member of the group throughout several major changes in members. In November 2010, Tachibana announced that she would be leaving Dream in 2011.

== Discography ==
Kono Hito「この人」 (For Tokyo Purin) - 2004

Hikari「ヒカリ」 - 2015

Ano Hohoemi Wo「あの微笑みを」 - 2015

== Collaborations ==
[2005.07.27] SLOW DANCE ORIGINAL SOUND TRACK (#6 Three Years, #10 Tachibana Kana, Mayu, natsu - One More Time, #15 Tachibana Kana, Mayu - Koi no Melody)

[2012.03.07] Shirota Yu - UNO (#7 Obstinacy feat. Kana Tachibana)
