= Dream discography =

- Studio albums: 4
- EPs: 3
- Compilation albums: 5
- Tribute albums: 2
- Singles: 27
- Video albums: 13
- Remix albums: 1

The discography of Japanese pop girl group Dream consists of four studio albums, five compilation albums, two tribute albums, three extended plays, twenty-seven singles and thirteen video albums. The group debuted under Avex Trax as a three-piece group in 2000, and it has since then undergone many changes. In August 2010, Dream released their official major re-debut single, "My Way: Ulala" under Rhythm Zone after switching management to LDH.

The original trio sold over 950,700 records, and in total the group sold over 1,100,000 records over the span of 10 years.

== Studio albums ==
List of albums, with selected chart positions
Title	Album details	Peak positions	Sales (JPN) (Note: Sales provided by Oricon database and are rounded to the nearest thousand.)
Title	Album details	JPN	Sales (JPN)
Dear...	Released: February 28, 2001 (JPN); Label: Avex Trax; Formats: CD	5	125,000
Process	Released: February 14, 2002 (JPN); Label: Avex Trax; Formats: CD	8	66,000
ID	Released: March 10, 2004 (JPN); Label: Avex Trax; Formats: CD, CD/DVD	21	—N/a
Hands Up!	Released: November 24, 2010 (JPN); Label: Rhythm Zone; Formats: CD, CD/DVD	36	5,000

== Extended plays ==
List of albums, with selected chart positions
Title	Album details	Peak positions
Title	Album details	JPN
Natsuiro (ナツイロ; "Summer Color")	Released: July 27, 2005 (JPN); Label: Avex Trax; Formats: CD, CD/DVD	28
Boy meets Girl	Released: December 21, 2005 (JPN); Label: Avex Trax; Formats: CD, CD/DVD	66
DRM	Released: June 27, 2007 (JPN); Label: Avex Trax; Formats: CD, CD/DVD	108

== Compilation albums ==
List of albums, with selected chart positions
Title	Album details	Peak positions	Sales (JPN)
Title	Album details	JPN	Sales (JPN)
Eternal Dream	Released: June 26, 2002 (JPN); Label: Avex Trax; Formats: CD	9	88,000
777: Best of Dreams	Released: September 28, 2004 (JPN); Label: Avex Trax; Formats: CD	33	—N/a
777: Another Side Story	Released: March 9, 2005 (JPN); Label: Avex Trax; Formats: CD	63	5,000
7th Anniversary Best	Released: January 1, 2007 (JPN); Label: Avex Trax; Formats: CD, CD/DVD	62	8,000
Greatest Live Hits	Live album; Released: January 1, 2007 (JPN); Label: Avex Trax; Formats: CD	293	—N/a

== Cover albums ==
List of albums, with selected chart positions
Title	Album details	Peak positions
Title	Album details	JPN
Dream World	Released: February 26, 2003 (JPN); Label: Avex Trax; Formats: CD, CD/DVD	23
Dream Meets Best Hits Avex	Released: December 8, 2004 (JPN); Label: Avex Trax; Formats: CD	54

== Remix albums ==
List of albums, with selected chart positions
Title	Album details	Peak positions	Sales (JPN)
Title	Album details	JPN	Sales (JPN)
Super Eurobeat Presents Euro "Dream" Land	Released: September 20, 2000 (JPN); Label: Avex Trax; Formats: CD	10	72,000

== Singles ==
=== As lead artists ===
List of singles, with selected chart positions
Title	Year	Peak chart positions		Sales (JPN)	Album
Title	Year	JPN Oricon	JPN Hot 100 (Note: The Japan Hot 100 was established in February 2008.) (Note: Sources for chart positions are as follows: "Only You", "Darling", "Konna ni mo", "Blanket Snow",)	Sales (JPN)	Album
"Movin 'On"	2000	15	—	101,000	Dear...
"Heart on Wave"	2000	14	—	—N/a	Dear...
"Breakin' out"	2000	14	—	—N/a	Dear...
"Private Wars"	2000	13	—	—N/a	Dear...
"Reality"	2000	17	—	—N/a	Dear...
"Super Eurobeat presents Night of Fire"	2000	20	—	—N/a	Dear...
"My Will"	2000	6	—	105,000	Dear...
"Believe in You"	2001	36	—	—N/a	Dear...
"solve"	2001	17	—	—N/a	Process
"Our Time"	2001	25	—	—N/a	Process
"Stay: Now I'm Here"	2001	19	—	—N/a	Process
"Get Over"	2001	12	—	—N/a	Process
"Yourself"	2002	21	—	—N/a	Process
"Sincerely: Ever Dream"	2002	19	—	—N/a	Eternal Dream
"Music Is My Thing"	2003	18	—	—N/a	Dream World
"I Love Dream World"	2003	10	—	—N/a	ID
"Identity: Prologue"	2004	23	—	—N/a	ID
"Pure"	2004	33	—	—N/a	777: Best of dreams
"Love Generation"	2004	26	—	—N/a	777: Best of dreams
"Soyokaze no Shirabe" (そよ風の調べ; "Melody of the Gentle Breeze")	2005	26	—	9,000	7th Anniversary Best
"Story"	2005	26	—	9,000	7th Anniversary Best
"Perfect Girls" (Note: Single sold exclusively at Dream's live performances and through mu-mo.)	2009	—	—	—N/a	Hands Up!
"To The Top"	2009	—	—	—N/a	Hands Up!
"Breakout"	2010	—	—	—N/a	Hands Up!
"My Way: Ulala"	2010	29	—	5,000	Hands Up!
"Ev'rybody Alright!"	2010	34	—	3,000	Hands Up!
"Only You"	2013	7	34	23,000	Non-album singles
"Darling" (ダーリン)	2014	4	13	27,000	Non-album singles
"Konna ni mo" (こんなにも; "So Much")	2015	3	14	23,000	Non-album singles
"Blanket Snow" (ブランケット・スノウ)	2015	4	9	34,000	Non-album singles

=== As featured artists ===
List of singles, with selected chart positions
Title	Year	Peak chart positions	Sales (JPN)	Album
Title	Year	JPN Oricon	Sales (JPN)	Album
"1st X'mas" (featuring Dream, Fruit Punch, SweetS)	2003	16	—N/a	Best X'mas
"2nd X'mas" (featuring Dream, SweetS, Kayo Aiko)	2004	—	—N/a	Best X'mas
"3rd X'mas" (featuring Dream, Nagasawa Nao, SweetS, Hoshii Nanase, Kayo Aiko, Paradise Go!! Go!!, Michi Saito)	2005	—	—N/a	Best X'mas
"Peace Sunshine" (among Dance Earth Party)	2014	5	16,000	I
"Ashita Waratte Irareru Youni" (明日笑っていられるように; "To Be Able to Laugh Tomorrow") (among Tokyo Purin to Taisetsu na Nakama-tachi)	2014	97	900	Non-album single

=== Promotional singles ===
List of promotional singles, with selected chart positions
Title	Year	Peak chart positions	Album
Title	Year	JPN Hot 100	Album
"Touchy Touchy"	2008	—	DRM
"Electric"	2008	—	DRM
"Tasty"	2008	—	DRM
"To You"	2008	—	DRM
"To You..."	2011	—	Non-album single
"Dreaming Girls"	2011	—	"Celebration!" (single)
"My Day, One Way"	2013	—	"Only You" (single)
"Wanna Wanna Go!"	2013	—	"Darling" (single)

== Other appearances ==
Title	Year	Other artist(s)	Album
"Get My Way"	2010	Aili	Future
"Happy Birthday"	2017		I

== Video albums ==
=== Music video collections ===
List of media, with selected chart positions
Title	Album details	Peak positions
Title	Album details	JPN
Daydream	Released: March 7, 2001 (JPN); Label: Avex Trax; Formats: DVD, VHS	11
Daydream2	Released: March 20, 2002 (JPN); Label: Avex Trax; Formats: DVD	27
Dream Clip Selection	Released: November 11, 2002 (JPN); Label: Avex Trax; Formats: DVD	56
Dream Party	Released: March 19, 2003 (JPN); Label: Avex Trax; Formats: DVD	29

=== Live concerts ===
List of media, with selected chart positions
Title	Album details	Peak positions
Title	Album details	JPN
Dream Live 2001	Released: August 8, 2001 (JPN); Label: Avex Trax; Formats: DVD, VHS	7
Dream Live 2002 "Process"	Released: December 26, 2002 (JPN); Label: Avex Trax; Formats: DVD	50
Dream Live 2003: Dream World	Released: August 6, 2003 (JPN); Label: Avex Trax; Formats: DVD	25
Dream Party 2	Released: September 29, 2004 (JPN); Label: Avex Trax; Formats: DVD	33
Dream Christmas Party 2004	Released: March 9, 2005 (JPN); Label: Avex Trax; Formats: DVD	38
Dream Party 2006: Love & Dream	Released: June 14, 2006 (JPN); Label: Avex Trax; Formats: DVD	34
Dream Party 2006 X'mas	Released: April 11, 2007 (JPN); Label: Avex Trax; Formats: DVD	58

=== Other video albums ===
List of media, with selected chart positions
Title	Album details	Peak positions
Title	Album details	JPN
ID	Musical DVD; Released: May 26, 2004 (JPN); Label: Avex Trax; Formats: DVD	48
Boy Meets Girl: A Little More	Released: February 15, 2006 (JPN); Label: Avex Trax; Formats: DVD	146

== Vinyl ==
List of albums
Title	Album details
Euro "dream" Land EP	Released: February 28, 2001 (JPN); Label: Rhythm Republic; Formats: Vinyl
