= Maurizio De Jorio =

- Born: 24 September 1968 (age 57); Trento, Italy
- Genres: Italo disco; Eurobeat
- Instrument: Vocals
- Years active: 1987–present
- Labels: Delta Music Industry; SinclaireStyle
- Website: www.sinclairestyle.net

Maurizio De Jorio (born September 24, 1968) is an Italian music producer and singer, born in Trento, Italy. He became involved in mainstream musical production in the mid-1980s.

Like most musicians in the Eurobeat genre, De Jorio has performed under a number of pseudonyms for various labels (including Delta, and SinclaireStyle). He is most well known for being one part of the Eurodance group Max Coveri, alongside Edoardo Arlenghi, Mauro Farina, Corrado Baretta, Bratt Sinclaire, and Pamela Prandoni, producing hit tracks such as "Running in the 90s" and "Night of Fire". Both are featured in the anime Initial D – of which both appearances (among other songs featured in the anime) has garnered incredible popularity for De Jorio and the Eurobeat genre in general. Some of the other songs used in Initial D are: "Speedy Speed Boy", "Stop Your Self Control" (as 'Marko Polo'), "Golden Age", "Running in the 90s" (as 'Max Coveri'), "Take Me to the Top", (as 'D. Essex') and "No One Sleep In Tokyo (with Fernando Bonini as 'Edo Boys')".

De Jorio's musical origins starts with his single "In A New World" (as Tom Maurice) in 1987 at Out Records, then in 1991, Gino Caria had taken him to A.Beat-C. and signed him to the record, beginning his Eurobeat career. His first song that he lent his vocals to was "Love & Celebration" by David Essex. in 1992, he had started working with Andrea Leonardi (Bratt Sinclaire), who was currently freelancing for the label. He split from A.Beat-C. later in the mid-1990s to join Sinclaire and his newly co-founded Eurobeat label, Delta Music Industry, which was also co-founded by Laurent Schruster Gelmetti (Laurent Newfield) and Clara Elena Moroni, who had both worked at Time Records. De Jorio had worked with Newfield and Moroni for a good number of songs, which in 2019, were released on the Delta Ultimate Collection and Bratt Sinclaire Eurobeat Style album compilations. Currently, De Jorio performs only under his alias Dejo for Bratt Sinclaire's label, SinclaireStyle.

De Jorio joined Max Coveri in 1996, replacing Massimo Maglione before he adopted the drag queen alias Billy More.

== Partial discography ==
=== As lead artist ===
As 7th Heaven

==== 1990s ====
| Year | Title | Album |
|---|---|---|
| 1999 | Last Christmas | Super Euro X'Mas II; Aerobeat Eurobeat - Version 5 Super Eurobeat Vol. 143; Super Eurobeat Christmas 2004; Super Euro Christmas 2006; Eurobeat For Christmas; Super Euro X'mas 2007; Best Of Super Euro X'Mas; Newfield-Moroni Productions Presents Eurobeat Masters The Missing Files Stage 2 |

As Derreck Simons

- TNT

==== 2000s ====
| Year | Title | Album |
|---|---|---|
| 2003 | It's My Life | Super Eurobeat Vol. 139; Super Eurobeat Vol. 143; Newfield-Moroni Productions Presents Eurobeat Masters The Missing Files Stage 2 |

As Alan Ford

| Year | Title | Album |
|---|---|---|
| 1994 | Magic (Magic Extended Mix) | Super Eurobeat Vol. 49 - Extended Version |

As Casanova

- Lost In The Time (Extended Version) (released 21 Nov 1992) (Super Eurobeat Vol. 29 - Extended Version)
- Lost In The Time (Acappella) (released 1992) (Lost In The Time)
- Lost In The Time (Extended Mix) (released 1992) (Lost In The Time)
- Lost In The Time (Instrumental) (released 1992) (Lost In The Time)
- Lost In The Time (Radio Mix) (released 1992) (Lost In The Time)
- Power of Love (released 21 March 1993) (Super Eurobeat Vol. 31 - Extended Version)
- Lost In The Time (released 21 May 1993) (Super Eurobeat Vol. 33 - Non-Stop Mix- King & Queen Special)
- Don't Leave Me Now (released 21 Aug 1993) (Super Eurobeat Vol. 36 - Non Stop Mega Mix- King & Queen Special) (Super Eurobeat Presents Men's 濡れユーロ~ノン・ストップ男性哀愁ユーロ・スペシャル~)
- Don't Leave Me Now (Bonus Track) (released 1993) (Don't Leave Me Now)
- Don't Leave Me Now (Dance Mix) (released 1993) (Don't Leave Me Now)
- Don't Leave Me Now (Playback) (released 1993) (Don't Leave Me Now)
- Don't Leave Me Now (Radio Edit) (released 1993) (Don't Leave Me Now)
- Feel The Passion (released 24 Dec 1993) (Super Eurobeat Vol. 40 - Anniversary Nonstop Edition) (Super Eurobeat Presents Men's 濡れユーロ~ノン・ストップ男性哀愁ユーロ・スペシャル~)
- Feel The Passion (Bonus Track) (released 1993) (Feel The Passion)
- Feel The Passion (Extended Mix) (released 1993) (Feel The Passion) (Super Eurobeat Vol. 38 - Extended Version)
- Feel The Passion (Instrumental) (released 1993) (Feel The Passion)
- Feel The Passion (Radio Mix) (released 1993) (Feel The Passion)
- In The Name Of Love (Y & Co Mix) (released 1993) (In The Name Of Love (Remix) / What Is Love (Remix)) (Super Eurobeat Vol. 95)
- In The Name Of Love (released 21 July 1994) (Super Eurobeat Vol. 47 - Non-Stop Mega Mix) (Maharaja Night Vol. 12 - Non-Stop Disco Mix) (Super Eurobeat Vol. 50 - Anniversary Non-Stop Mix - Greatest Euro Hits 50!) (The Best Of Non-Stop Super Eurobeat 1994) (~The Early Days Of SEB~ Euro Darkness 3) (Super Eurobeat Presents Vol. 200 Release Special Collection Vol. 1) (The Best Of 90s Super Eurobeat 70 Mins 70 Songs)
- In The Name Of Love (Bonus Track) (released 1994) (Suspicious / In The Name Of Love)
- In The Name Of Love (Extended Version) (released 1994) (Suspicious / In The Name Of Love)
- In The Name Of Love (Extended Mix) (released 21 Apr 1994) (Super Eurobeat Vol. 44 - Extended Version)
- In The Name Of Love (Instrumental) (released 1994) (Suspicious / In The Name Of Love)
- In The Name Of Love (Radio Version) (released 1994) (Suspicious / In The Name Of Love)
- Under Pressure (Extended Mix) (released 21 July 1994) (Maharaja Night - Hi-NRG Revolution Vol. 11)
- Under Presser (Extended Mix) (released 1994) (I Love Disco Dance / Under Presser)
- Under Presser (Special Radio Mix) (released 1994) (I Love Disco Dance / Under Presser)
- Suspicious (Bonus Track) (released 1994) (Suspicious / In The Name Of Love)
- Suspicious (Extended Mix) (released 1994) (Suspicious / In The Name Of Love)
- Suspicious (FM Version) (released 1994) (Suspicious / In The Name Of Love)
- Suspicious (Playback) (released 1994) (Suspicious / In The Name Of Love)
- I Did It For Love (Extended Mix) (released 21 Aug 1995) (Super Eurobeat Vol. 59 - Extended Version)
- Help Me To Say Goodbye (released 22 May 1996) (Super Eurobeat Vol. 67) (Super Eurobeat Vol. 230 - Anniversary Hits 100 Tracks)
- Help Me To Say Goodbye (Acappella Version) (released 1996) (Help Me To Say Goodbye)
- Help Me To Say Goodbye (Extended Mix) (released 1996) (Help Me To Say Goodbye)
- Help Me To Say Goodbye (F.M. Version) (released 1996) (Help Me To Say Goodbye)
- Help Me To Say Goodbye (Playback Version) (released 1996) (Help Me To Say Goodbye)
- I Would Die for You (released 25 September 1996) (Super Eurobeat Vol. 71)
- Jealous Guy (released 23 Apr 1997) (Super Eurobeat Vol. 77)
- Just for Tonight (released 24 Jun 1998) (Super Eurobeat Vol. 89) (Eurobeat Masters Vol. 2) (Super Eurobeat Presents Men's 濡れユーロ~ノン・ストップ男性哀愁ユーロ・スペシャル~)
- Same Old Feeling (released 19 September 2002) (Super Eurobeat Vol. 131)
- Coming Home (released 2002) (The Sound Of Frozen Pop Hits)
- Superfly (released 22 January 2003) (Super Eurobeat Vol. 134) (The Best Of Non-Stop Super Eurobeat 2003)
- Satisfy My Soul (released 27 April 2005) (Super Eurobeat Presents Super GT 2005)
- The Hero (released 2005) (Super Eurobeat Vol. 157)
- Holiday (Instrumental Mix) (released 3 May 2014) (Beach Club Records Instrumental Versions - Volume 1)
- Crazy Love (released 25 January 2019, unreleased track from 2001) (Crazy Love)
- Crazy Love (Platinum Version) (released 18 June 2014) (Super Eurobeat Vol. 229 - Extended Version)

As Dejo

- 1.2.3.4. Fire! (Extended Mix) (released 1 September 2010) (Super Eurobeat Vol. 207)
- Boys Gone Wild (released 23 January 2013) (Boys Gone Wild)
- Drifting all night (released 28 October 2020) (Best of Super Eurobeat 2020)
- For The Fans with Tora (released 18 June 2014) (For The Fans)
- In The Eyes Of A Tiger with Bratt (released 18 February 2015) (In The Eyes Of A Tiger)
- Lightning Over Japan
- Loving Eurobeat with Bon (released 12 February 2013) (Loving Eurobeat)
- Too Young to Fall in Love (released 7 January 2009) (Super Eurobeat Vol. 193 - Revival Hits)
- We Rock'em All with Chai (released 22 June 2016) (Super Eurobeat Vol. 239 - Extended Version)
- Wheelpower And Go! with Bon (released 2 February 2010) (Super Eurobeat Vol. 211)
- Wilder Faster Louder (released 15 January 2014) (Wilder Faster Louder)

As Delta All-Stars (with Clara Moroni, Davide Gelosa, and Daniela Rando)
- Christmas Time
- Trust Me

As David Essex / D. Essex / D-Essex

- Goodbye Illusion
- Love & Celebration
- Sin of Love
- All Your Love (Dance Mix)
- Burning Love
- Demolition Man
- Listen to the Rhythm
- Tokyo Tokyo
- Victim of Love
- Boom Boom Fire
- Boom Boom Fire (Hyper Techno Version)
- Breaking The Law
- Dancing Crazy
- Fahrenheit Euronight
- Hyper Star Energy
- Master Power
- Max Power with Dr. Love
- Music for Hire
- Music Forever
- Restless and Wild
- Take Me to the Top
- Thank You-Arigato

As Edo Boys (with Fernando Bonini)

- No One Sleep In Tokyo
- My Rock Is For Japan

As Kevin Johnson

- Big Is Your Faith
- Welcome to my World
- Yankee

As Marko Polo

- Baby Queen Seventeen
- Cyberdance Technotrance
- Hai Hai Hai (Dance Across the Nations)
- I Want to Believe
- Mad Guy
- Money Go!
- Peace and Love for Christmas
- Saturday Night
- Speedy Speed Boy
- Stop Your Self Control
- Tokyo Fever

As Max Coveri

- Golden Age
- High Desire
- I Don't Wanna Break Your Sweet Heart
- Like a Thunder
- Running in the 90s
- Supercar

As Morris

- Crazy For Your Love
- Go Say Goal! (with Cherry)
- Still Love You All (with Cherry)
- Go! Save Goal (with Cherry)
- Bad Tonight
- Destination Unknown

As Niko

- 1 for the Money, 2 for the Show
- Electric Power
- It's My Life
- Let's Go Wild!
- Livin' On A Prayer
- Made of Fire
- Night of Fire
- Night of Fire (For Christmas Mix)
- Night of Fire (Hyper Techno Mix)
- Onto the Beat of my Bang Bang!
- Pilot Is the Hero
- Speedway
- Superbad
- Super Eurobeat
- Tora Tora Tora 2005 (with Cherry and The Prophet)
- We Came for the Rock
- Niko Kickboxing (with Cherry)
- Super Mega Stars (with Domino)

As Oda

- Face to Face
- Sex Crime
- Shy Gun
- Speed Demon (King of Kings)

As Roswell

- Alien Light
- Come On!
- My Way

As SEB All Stars (With Giancarlo Pasquini, Alessandra Gatti, Christian Codenatti, Luigi Raimondi, Ennio Zanini, Davide Di Marcantonio, Mauro Farina, Federico Pasquini, Evelin Malferrari, and Federico Rimonti)

- SEB 4 U

As SinclaireStyle All Stars (With Roberta Grana and Manuela Leschino)

- Xmas Love

As Tokyo Future (With Fernando Bonini)

- Tokyo Future (Signed as Tokyo Future ft. Marko Polo and Mako)

== Inclusion in other media ==
- Many of his songs are used for fad music on the website, YTMND.
- His promotional model, Edoardo Arlenghi, is used in place of his own image for the marketing of songs under his pseudonym "Niko". He can be seen most prominently in the music video for the song "Night of Fire".
- Various songs including "Night of Fire" (as Niko), "Speedy Speed Boy" as (Marko Polo), "Golden Age", "Running in the 90s" (both as Max Coveri), "Crazy For Your Love" (as Morris), "Take Me To The Top" (as D.Essex), and "Wheelpower & Go!" (as Dejo with Bon) are featured in the Japanese anime Initial D, which contributed to the popularity of Eurobeat music. Additionally, "Running in the 90s" became an Internet meme due to its inclusion in Initial D, being played in many videos where vehicles are seen driving at high speeds.
  - Other of his songs, such as "Stop Your Self Control" (as Marko Polo) and "Burning Love" (as D.Essex) appeared in other media based on the series.
  - Songs such as "Wilder Faster Louder" (as Dejo) and "In The Eyes Of A Tiger" (as Dejo with Bratt) are featured in the Japanese anime MF Ghost, the sequel of Initial D.
- One of his first aliases was "David Essex", which came from the 70' famous British singer David Essex (David Albert Cook). The reason why it went back to the truncated "D. Essex/D-Essex" is due to David Essex's lawyer threatening to sue for usage of the name clashing with his discography.
