= Billy More =

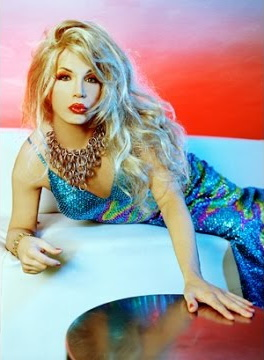

Background information
- Also known as: Massimo Maglione
- Born: Massimo Brancaccio; 3 February 1965
- Died: 14 August 2005 (aged 40)
- Occupations: Drag queen; music artist

Massimo Brancaccio, known by the stage name Billy More (3 February 1965 – 14 August 2005), was an Italian drag queen and music artist based in Milan. He is best remembered as being the former lead vocalist for Italian Eurodance group Max Coveri.

== Biography ==
Brancaccio first started out as an Italo disco singer in the 1980s, performing several songs with Max Coveri, alongside producer Mauro Farina. He left in 1992 to pursure a solo career, and was replaced by producer and vocalist Maurizio De Jorio.

The Billy More project began when Brancaccio met Roberto Santini (RSDJ), a disc jockey in Zip Club, Milan. The actual vocalist of Billy More's songs is John Biancale.

Billy More's first single, "Up & Down (Do not Fall in Love with Me)", released in 2000, reached #5 in the Italian music chart, #14 in the Austrian music chart, and #21 in the German music chart. More released another single, "Come On and Do It (Saturdaynightlife)" in 2001.

He released the singles "I Keep On Burning", "Weekend", and "Dance" in 2002 and 2003. He cooperated with DJ Speciale to produce another single called "Try Me". He released his last single "Gimme Love" in 2005.

He died from an illness resulting from leukemia in Milan on 14 August 2005. He is buried in a cemetery in Castelletto sopra Ticino, Piedmont.

== Discography ==
=== Singles ===
Title	Year	Peak Chart Positions					
Title	Year	ITA	AUT	FRA	GER	SPA	SWI
"Love Will Keep Us Higher" (as Max Coveri & Roby Gabrielli)	1989	N/A					
"Guy, Guy" (as Max Coveri)	1989	N/A					
"Toy Boy" (as Max Coveri)	1990	N/A					
"One Two Three" (as Max Coveri & Radiorama)	1990	N/A					
"Pretty Woman" (as Max Coveri)	1990	N/A					
"I Wanna Love You" (as Max Coveri)	1991	N/A					
"Dance Dance" (as Max Coveri)	1991	N/A					
"Come Back" (as Max Coveri)	1992	N/A					
"Up & Down (Don't Fall in Love with Me)"	2000	5	14	89	21	8	84
"The New Millennium Girl"	2000	36	-	-	-	-	-
"Come On and Do It (Saturday Night Life)"	2001	41	66	-	82	-	-
"Loneliness"	2001	-	-	-	-	-	-
"I Keep On Burning"	2002	32	-	-	-	-	-
"Try Me" (with DJ Speciale)	2003	-	-	-	-	-	-
"Weekend"	2003	-	-	-	-	-	-
"Boom Boom! (Let's Go Back to My Room)"	2004	-	-	-	-	-	-
"My Rhythm of the Night" (with DJ Roby Pinna)	2004	-	-	-	-	-	-
"Gimme Love"	2005	-	-	-	-	-	-
