= Alberto Contini =

Italian musician

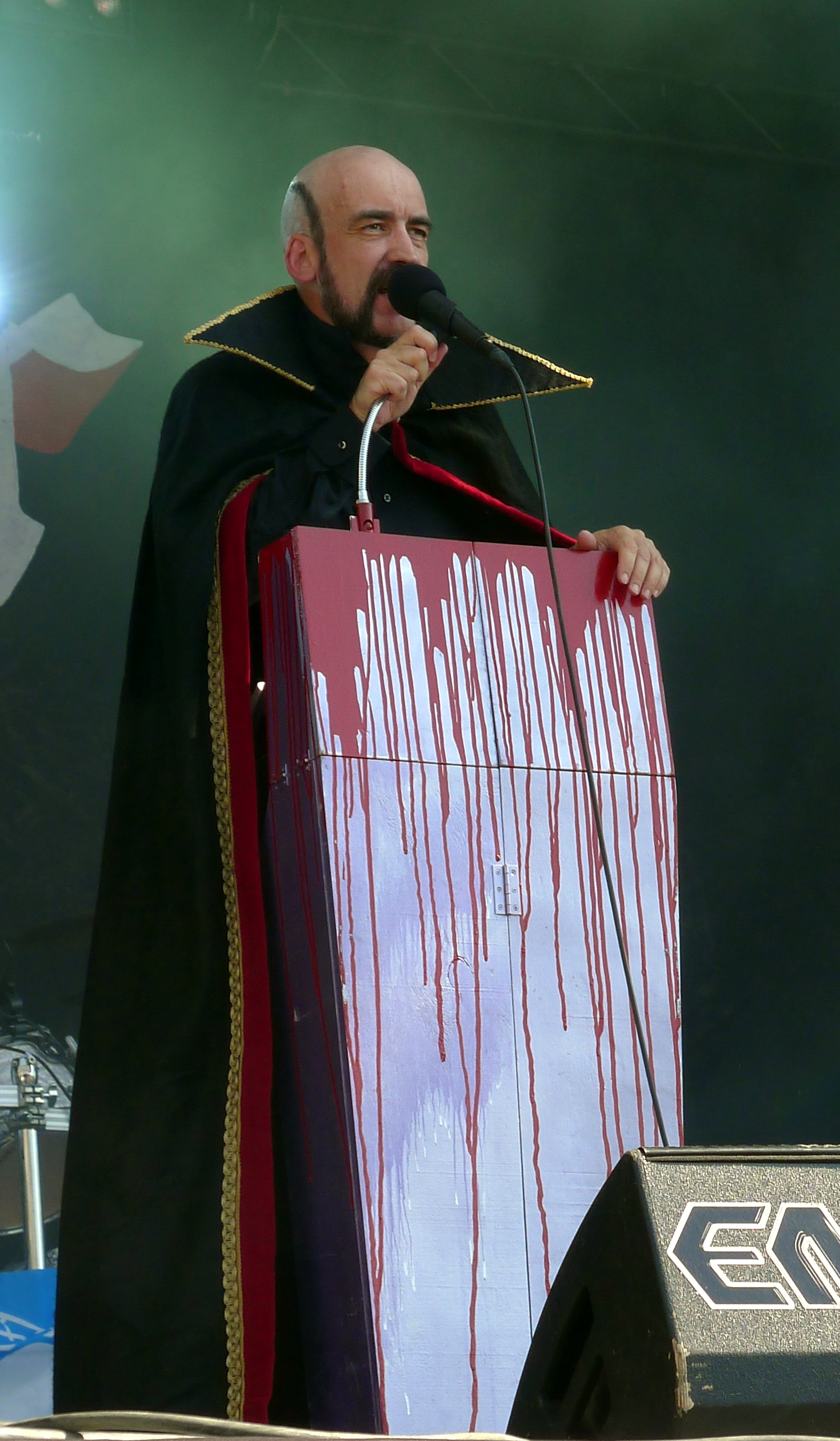
- Contini at Tuska Open Air 2011

Background information
- Also known as: A.C. Wild
- Born: 1965 (age 60–61); Italy
- Genres: Thrash metal; speed metal; black metal
- Occupations: Musician; record producer; songwriter
- Instruments: Vocals; bass; keyboards
- Years active: 1981–present
- Member of: Bulldozer

Alberto Contini (born 1965), also known as A.C. Wild, is an Italian musician and record producer. He has been the vocalist, bassist or keyboardist for the Italian extreme metal band Bulldozer since the early 1980s, and has produced many works in the Italo disco and Eurobeat scenes since the early 1990s.

== Biography ==
In 1984, Contini met Bratt Sinclaire, who later became his long term co-worker. He joined Bulldozer in the same year and served as its vocalist and bassist with the stage name A.C. Wild until 1992.

In 1990, Contini, then an A&R for Discomagic Records, co-founded the A-Beat C dance label with Dave Rodgers. The label signed a big deal with the Japanese dance label Avex Trax and produced many mega-hit works for "J-Euro" artists including MAX, V6, and the future "Queen of J-pop" Namie Amuro.

He made his first appearance on the Super Eurobeat compilation series in 1991, at Vol. 13, with three tracks co-produced with Dave Rodgers. Since then he has produced countless works for the series, including Vol. 14, 17, 18, 20, 27, 44, 58, 65, 68, 74, 82, 84, 88, 89, 92, 95, 97, 99, 103, 171, 173, and many other Eurobeat/Hi-NRG compilations and the Super Eurobeat Presents series by Avex, including the Maharaja Night series, Initial D series, and J-Euro series : Ayu-ro Mix, Hyper Euro MAX and J-Euro Non-Stop Best.

Contini re-joined Bulldozer in 2008.
