= Mai Matsumuro =

Japanese pop singer and songwriter (born 1983)

Mai Matsumuro 松室 麻衣
- Born: June 10, 1983 (age 42); Nakatsu, Ōita, Japan
- Genres: Anison; Japanese pop
- Occupations: Musician; Singer-songwriter
- Instruments: Piano; Vocals
- Years active: 2000–2002 (dream); 2006–present
- Labels: Avex Trax (2000–2002); Emotional Music (2008–present)
- Website: blog.livedoor.jp/mai0610

Japanese name
- Kanji: 松室 麻衣
- Hiragana: まつむろ まい
- Katakana: マツムロ マイ
Transcriptions
- Romanization: Matsumuro Mai

Mai Matsumuro (松室 麻衣, Matsumuro Mai; born June 10, 1983) is a Japanese pop singer and songwriter. She was one of the three original members and original lead singer of the J-pop band Dream also known as "Dream/DRM".

In July 2002, she left the band to pursue a solo career. She is also known for writing the lyrics to the Japanese version of BoA's debut single, "ID; Peace B".

In 2006, Matsumuro launched a solo career, releasing digital singles.

== iTunes songs ==
- "Destiny / Love-1|Destiny / Love-1" (iTunes exclusive) [2006.06.21]
- "Chiisa na Hikari" (小さな光) [2006.12.27]
- "Feelings '07" [2007.09.19]
- "Existence" [2008.03.19]
- "Koigoromo" (恋衣) [2008.05.07]
- "Dramatic" [2008.06.11]
