= Aleph (band) =

Italian disco band

Aleph is a 1980s Italo disco band, featuring the vocals of Dave Rodgers. The other members of the group were Donato Bellini and Marco Manzi. They achieved a fair amount of success with the single "Fly To Me" in 1985, which reached the Top Ten in several countries. They released two LPs, "Black Out" in 1988 and "Take My Life" in 1989, both originally released on Time Records. The group later released three songs in the late 1990s.

== Discography ==
Studio albums

- Black Out (1988)
- Take My Life (1989)

Singles

Year	Title	Album
1984	In Your Eyes	
1985	Fly To Me	Black Out
1986	Fire on the Moon	Black Out
1987	I'm In Danger	Black Out
1988	Check It Up	Black Out
1988	Big Brother	Black Out
1988	Black Out	Black Out
1989	Hero	Take My Life
1989	Bad Power	Take My Life
1990	Doctor	Take My Life
1990	Break Away	Take My Life
1990	Take My Life	Take My Life
1997	Let The Music Play	Super Eurobeat Vol. 77
1997	Generation of Love	Super Eurobeat Vol. 79
1998	Get Wild	Super Eurobeat Vol. 91
2018	I'm On Fire	On vinyl only
2018	Time	On vinyl only
