= Dream (Japanese group) =

Japanese pop girl group

- Origin: Japan
- Genres: Anison; Dance-pop; J-pop; Electropop; Eurobeat
- Years active: 2000–2017
- Labels: Avex Trax (2000–2008); Rhythm Republic (2008–2011); Rhythm Zone (2011–2017)
- Past members: Mai Matsumuro; Yu Hasebe; Kana Tachibana; Risa Ai; Sayaka Yamamoto; Erie Abe; Aya Takamoto; Shizuka Nishida; Ami Nakashima
- Website: dream-ldh.jp

Dream (ドリーム, Dorīmu) was a Japanese pop girl group. The group was formed as a result of a 1999 talent contest called "Avex Dream 2000". Originally a three-piece group consisting of Mai Matsumuro, Kana Tachibana, and Yu Hasebe, the group has undergone many changes since its debut in 2000 on the Avex Trax label, and none of the original trio remain. The original trio sold over 950,700 records, and in total the group has sold over 1,100,000 records over the span of 10 years.

On July 7, 2002, the main lyricist Mai Matsumuro left the group to pursue a solo career. After Matsumuro's departure, Avex held another audition to replace Matsumuro. Instead of one, six new members won the audition, resulting in an eight-member (Dream) group with the debut single "Music is My Thing". In March 2004, Risa Ai left to pursue a solo career. They became a 7-member group as performed this way until 2007. During this time, the band's name changed from dream to DRM.

In August 2008, Yu Hasebe left the group to pursue a solo career, leaving Kana Tachibana behind as the only original member of dream. Afterward, DRM became Dream again.

In August 2010, Dream released their official major re-debut single, "My Way: Ulala" on the Rhythm Zone label. On November 24, 2010, Dream released their first album as a six-member group, titled Hands Up! on the Rhythm Zone label.

On November 23, 2010, Tachibana announced that she would leave the group. This marked the departure of the last member of the original three-member group. She officially left the group on February 20, 2011. On March 30, 2012, Sayaka Yamamoto departed to pursue a solo career.

== History ==
=== Avex Dream 2000 ===
In 1999, the Avex label organized a talent contest, called "Avex Dream 2000", looking for the next big hit idol group. Over 120,000 hopefuls auditioned in front of a panel of judges, notably including Kaori Mochida of the popular band, Every Little Thing. Another of the entrants was Kumi Koda, who placed second and is now a popular singer.

The final winners of the competition were Mai Matsumuro, Kana Tachibana, and Yu Hasebe. They formed Avex's idol group Dream.

=== Debut as 3-member Dream ===
On January 1, 2000, Dream debuted with the single "Movin' On", which charted within the top 15 on the Oricon charts for seven weeks, and sold 100,910 copies. This song was used as an opening theme to the TV Tokyo show Sukiyaki!! London Boots Daisakusen. The promotional video for the A-side was released on the Daydream video. First pressings came with one of four trading cards (one of each member, and one of all three). "Reality" track was used in Dream's commercial campaign for "Sea Breeze" toiletries, and reached number 17 on the weekly Oricon charts and charted for five weeks. "Night of Fire" is a cover of the Eurobeat classic, previously recorded in English by the Italian artist Niko in 1999 and composed by Bratt Sinclaire, which also appeared in the popular anime and manga series, Initial D. The single reached #20 on the weekly Oricon charts in 2000. A promotional video for the single was released on the DAYDREAM DVD and VHS. Dream's version features Japanese lyrics by group member Mai Matsumuro. The single was simultaneously released on the same day as the Super Eurobeat Presents Euro Dream Land album.

Their next few singles all charted in similar territory, failing to break the top 10 until their sixth single, "My Will", made it to number 6 at the end of 2000. "My will" was the song that gave Dream newfound fame as it was the first ending theme to the popular anime Inuyasha. "Believe In You" was used as an ending theme for the NTV show ZZZ Romihi. "Solve" reached #17 on the weekly Oricon charts and charted for three weeks. It was the May 2001 ending theme for Nihon TV show Pinpapa and the image song for the Japanese release of Little Nicky. "Our Time" reached #25 on the weekly Oricon charts and charted for three weeks, and was used as an opening theme for the TV Tokyo show Sukiyaki!! London Boots Daisakusen. The music video of the song was shot on the location of Oahu Island in Hawaii. "Stay: Now I'm Here" reached #19 on the weekly Oricon charts and charted for two weeks, and was used in a CM for Kanebo Hadabisei (in which none of dream's members appear).

On February 28, 2001, Dream released their debut album, Dear.... The album reached number 5 on the Oricon charts. Also on November 28, 2001, Dream released "Get Over", the first opening theme to the anime Hikaru no Go. It reached number 12 on the Oricon charts. "Yourself", released in January 2002, was the image song for the 80th All Japan High School Soccer Tournament, and the group's last video single. On February 14, 2002, dream released their second album, Process, which reached number 8 on the charts. Following the release of Process, Matsumuro, who wrote most of the group's lyrics, announced that she was to leave in pursuit of a solo career. Dream then released their final single as a 3-member group, "Sincerely: Ever Dream", went public on June 10, 2002, serving as a rework of "Sincerely" from the group's album Dear..., with new lyrics by graduating member Mai Matsumuro. A promotional video was released on the Dream live 2002 Process DVD. The title song was used as the third ending theme to the anime Hikaru no Go. This single marks the graduation of the lead member Matsumuro and was released on her birthday, June 10.

On June 26, 2002, Dream released their final release as a three-member group and their first best album, Eternal Dream. On July 7, 2002, Matsumuro left Dream.

=== 8-member Dream ===
Following Matsumuro's departure, Avex held more auditions for a replacement, and ended up with six new girls. They were Risa Ai, Erie Abe, Aya Takamoto, Ami Nakashima, Shizuka Nishida, and Sayaka Yamamoto.

The new eight-girl group "re-debuted" on 13 February 2003 with the single "Music is My Thing", which was used as the fifth ending theme to the anime Hikaru no Go. The song is a Japanese-language remake of a song originally recorded in English by Belgian artist Samantha Gilles in 1986. The promotional video was released on the Dream Party DVD and its "making of" was released on the dream world limited edition CD+DVD. The single reached number 18 on the weekly Oricon charts and charted for four weeks.

In February 2003, the group released their third album, Dream World. The album reached number 23 on the Oricon charts. Following Dream World, Dream's popularity once again peaked. They participated in the first a-nation summer concert festival held by Avex. They appeared on popular singer Ayumi Hamasaki's TV show, Ayuready. Subsequently, dream's next single, "I Love Dream World", became their first single to chart within the Oricon top 10 since "My Will" in 2000. In its official title, the phrase "love dream" is represented by a combination heart/peace sign (resulting in frequent misreadings, usually "I love world" or "I world").

In February 2004, they released "Identity: Prologue, which was used as the theme song for dream's ID stage musical, the opening song for the GameCube game Custom Robo Battle Revolution, and the image song for the 2004 Yokohama International Women's Ekiden. A PV for its a-side was released on the ID CD+DVD and their final single as an 8-member group.

In 2004, following the release of Dream's fourth album ID, Ai left Dream to pursue a solo career, bringing the group's member count down to seven.

=== 7-member Dream/DRM ===
From 2004–2005, Dream released the singles "Pure" and "Love Generation". "Soyokaze no Shirabe / Story" (March 2, 2005) is their last single released on the Avex Trax label, their third single as a 7-member group, and the last before changing their name to DRM. They also released two mini albums, Natsuiro and Boy meets Girl. In addition, Dream released a best album (777: Best of Dreams), an Avex cover album (Dream Meets Best Hits Avex), and a self cover album (777: Another Side Story).

After a long period without much activity, Dream released 7th Anniversary Best (a best of album featuring songs from the group's debut as a three-member unit up till their latest single) and Greatest Live Hits (an album featuring recordings of their live performances) on January 1, 2007 (the group's 7th anniversary).

==== DRM ====
On June 27, 2007, Dream was "reborn" as the dance/chorus group DRM in an attempt to shed their image as idols. The group debuted with the mini album DRM.

In 2008, DRM released four digital singles, the first being released in January and the last, in April. The singles were released on the 7th of each month (January 7, February 7, and so on). Like their mini album, the singles were not met with much success.

=== LDH and re-debut as Dream ===
On August 1, 2008, Yu Hasebe left DRM in pursuit of a solo career, leaving Kana Tachibana behind as the only member of the original Dream. The group changed its name back to Dream and their official fanclub (Live Your Dreams) closed down. Also, the group changed management from Avex to LDH (Love Dream Happiness).

On September 9, 2009, the group released its first single as Dream and its first physical single since 2005's "Soyokaze no Shirabe / Story". The new single was titled "Perfect Girls / To The Top" and was sold exclusively at a series of free shows Dream performed throughout Japan as well as on mu-mo (an online store). As a special release, it did not chart on Oricon. To promote their comeback, Dream embarked on a nationwide tour of Japan, performing at free live appearances in numerous cities.

Dream appeared on their first TV live on December 31, 2009 on CDTV Premium Live 2009>>2010, performing Perfect Girls. On March 1, 2010, Dream released their second single as a six-member group, titled "Breakout", another mu-mo exclusive. In May 2010, having completed their nationwide free performance campaign, Dream held a 3-date live tour titled Dream Live Tour 2010: Road to Dream. Dream also toured as a special guest on labelmate Exile's "Exile Live Tour 2010 Fantasy" alongside fellow LDH artists Happiness and Flower.

On August 18, 2010, Dream released their major label debut single, "My Way: Ulala" under the Rhythm Zone label. On October 6, 2010, Dream released their second major label single, "Ev'rybody Alright!". On November 24, 2010, Dream released their debut album as a six-member group and fifth studio album overall, Hands Up!. To promote the album, Dream went on the tour, titled Dream Live Tour 2010-2011 "Hands Up!!". On November 23, 2010, Kana Tachibana announced that she would leave the group on the group's official website. She officially graduated on February 20, 2011.

The 5 member Dream provided the theme song to the drama Detective Conan. The new song, titled "To you..." aired on April 15, 2011. However, it was only available via Japanese mobile services.

In 2011, the group became part of LDH's collaborative supergroup E-girls (which is the female counterpart of Exile) alongside Happiness and Flower.

Sayaka Yamamoto officially left the group on March 31, 2012.

In late 2016, Erie Abe announced that she would be leaving the entertainment industry by the end of year. Before that, Dream released their first photobook titled dreamはDreamの夢を見る。(dream wa Dream no yumewomiru。) after 14 years of the 4 members being together on November 30. The book describes the turbulent history of the group, the number of difficulties they had to face, the twists and turns in their career and the firm bond the members have. On December 31, 2016, Erie Abe officially left the group in hopes of studying abroad.

=== Disbandment ===
It was announced that Dream had disbanded due all members leaving to pursue on their own activities. Aya would be no longer be a vocalist or performer and instead focus on working behind the scenes as the E.G family chief creative manager, Ami would focus on her solo career, and Shizuka will be focusing on her other group Dance Earth Party.

On May 22, 2019, Shizuka made her solo debut as Dream Shizuka with the single "4FEELS", after Dance Earth Party announced their indefinite hiatus in December 2018.

== Members ==
=== Original members ===
- Mai Matsumuro (松室 麻衣) (Dream 01) (2000–2002)
- Yu Hasebe (長谷部 優) (Dream 08) (2000–2008)
- Kana Tachibana (橘 佳奈) (Dream 07) (2000–2011)

=== Second generation members ===
- Risa Ai (阿井 莉沙) (Dream 02) (2002–2004)
- Sayaka Yamamoto (山本 紗也加) (Dream 09) (2002–2012)
- Erie Abe (阿部 絵里恵) (Dream 03) (2002–2016)
- Aya Takamoto (高本 彩) (Dream 04) (2002–2017)
- Ami Nakashima (中島 麻未) (Dream 05) (2002–2017)
- Shizuka Nishida (西田 静香) (Dream 06) (2002– 2017)

== Discography ==
- Dear... (2001)
- Process (2002)
- ID (2004)
- Hands Up! (2010)
