= Time Records =

Italian record label

- Parent company: Time S.p.A.
- Founded: 1984; 41 years ago
- Founder: Giacomo Maiolini
- Distributor(s): Discomagic Records (1984–1996); Self Distribuzione (1996–present)
- Genre: Various
- Country of origin: Italy
- Location: Brescia
- Official website: timerec.it

Time Records is an Italian record company and label from Brescia founded by Giacomo Maiolini in the fall of 1984, teaming up with the duo Farina-Crivellente as the art producers. Except for a few of the early releases, it became a label distributed by Disco Magic and also a partner, until 1996, when Maiolini moved to start Self Distribuzione. Time Records rose to become one of the most prominent Italo dance labels from the middle of the eighties to the end of the decade.

Main artists are Atrium, Danny Keith, Riky Maltese, Aleph, Alan Barry, Virgin, Gipsy & Queen, De Niro, and Sophie. The label also gathered some Italo 'old glories' as Fred Ventura, Albert One, Jock Hattle, Stylóo (who all started under the Turatti-Chieregato production), and others like Rudy & Co., Max Coveri, Rose, Topo & Roby, and Silver Pozzoli.

Mauro Farina did the male vocals under several artist names (Danny Keith, Atrium, Kajay, Alan Barry, Tension, Max Coveri, Stylóo, De Niro, and Fellini, among others), until he left it together with Crivellente at the end of 1988 to start Asia Records. Clara Moroni, who joined at the end of 1986, was one of the main female voices since, also doing the backing vocals and choruses in many of the releases. Another of the big names was Laurent Gelmetti, who started as the recording and sound engineer, replacing to Sandro Oliva in 1986.

== Labels ==
As well as the eponymous "Time Records", the company stable also includes "Rise" (otherwise known as "Rise Records").

=== Time Records ===
Artists include:

- Albert One
- Aleph
- Ann Lee
- Dhany
- Sophie
- Imany
- Ken Laszlo
- Studio Killers
- TJ Davis

=== Rise Italy ===
Artists include:

- Alex Gaudino
- Avicii
- Deepswing
- Dirty South
- Mousse T
- Ricky L
- Riva Starr
- Robbie Rivera
