= Super Eurobeat =

Series of compilation albums

- Super Eurobeat Vol. 162 cover art

Compilation album series
- Released: 21 January 1990–present
- Genre: Eurobeat
- Label: Avex Trax

Super Eurobeat (Japanese: スーパー ユーロビート, Hepburn: Sūpā Yūrobīto; abbreviated SEB; officially stylized as SUPER EUROBEAT) is a CD compilation album series of Japanese Eurobeat music. It has been running for over three decades, making it one of the longest-running music compilations. Following Super Eurobeat Vol. 250 in 2018, the series became an annual release.

== History ==
Originally, Time Records, Flea Records and Discomagic were some of the record labels that appeared on the original Super Eurobeat albums. After eight non-stop albums, the series was changed over to Avex Trax. The series maintained a monthly release schedule, then bimonthly, until the end of 2018, when it shifted to a yearly schedule.

== Accolades ==
Year	Ceremony	Nominated work	Recipient(s)	Category	Result
2000	Japan Gold Disc Award	Super Eurobeat Presents Initial D ~D Non-Stop Mega Mix~	Avex Trax	Animation Album of the Year	Won
2000	Japan Gold Disc Award	Super Eurobeat Vol. 100 - Anniversary Special Request Count Down 100!!	Avex Trax	Album of the Year	Won
2001	Japan Gold Disc Award	Super Eurobeat Presents Initial D Best Selection	Avex Trax	Animation Album of the Year	Won
2001	Japan Gold Disc Award	Super Eurobeat Vol. 110 - Millennium Anniversary Non-Stop Megamix	Avex Trax	Album of the Year	Won

== See also ==
- Initial D
- Dave Rodgers
