= Dave Rodgers =

Italian singer

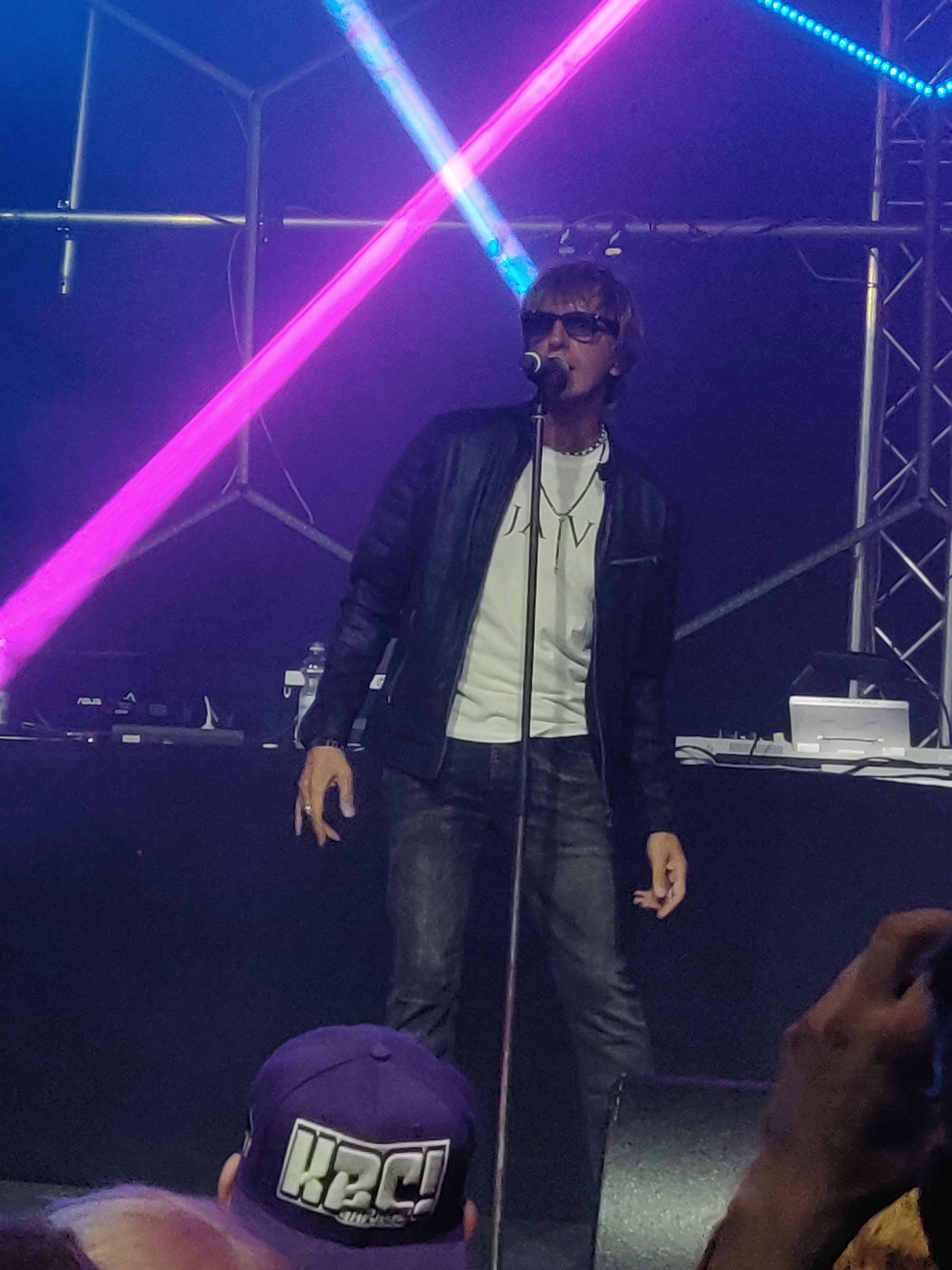
- Dave Rodgers performing at Tracon 2022 afterparty in Tampere, Finland.

Background information
- Born: Giancarlo Pasquini; February 21, 1960 (age 66); Mantua, Italy
- Genre: Eurobeat
- Occupations: Musician; singer; songwriter; record producer
- Years active: 1981–present
- Labels: A-Beat C; Dave Rodgers Music; Avex Trax

Giancarlo Pasquini (born 21 February 1960), known professionally as Dave Rodgers is an Italian singer, songwriter and producer known for his contributions to the Eurobeat genre of dance music. Born in Mantua, Italy, he formed the band Aleph before contributing to the long-running Super Eurobeat series. He owns Rodgers Studio and A-Beat C Productions alongside Alberto Contini.

In 2006, he released Blow Your Mind under the Rodgers alias, incorporating rock components in the album. In 2011, he left everything in the hands of Evelin Malferrari. During this time, Malferrari established a new Eurobeat label called Sun Fire Records, where Rodgers helped Malferrari to write a few songs.

In 2019, after a long legal battle with Malferrari (Futura Prince), he founded his own label Dave Rodgers Music and started producing a new catalogue, new videos and started collaborating and producing again with many artists like Kaioh, Annerley, Nuage, Domino, Powerful T, Norma Sheffield, Ace Warriors, Mickey B, Go Go Girls, Lou Grant, and Susan Bell.

Some of his songs, most notably "Déjà Vu", are featured in the anime Initial D, which contributed significantly to the popularity of Eurobeat music.

He is also known by the aliases Derek Simon, Robert Stone, Patrick Hoolley, Mario Ross, Red Skins, RCS, Aleph, the Big Brother, and Thomas & Schubert.

== Personal life ==
Pasquini was married to fellow Eurobeat artist Alessandra Mirka Gatti and has a son named Federico, who was raised by Gatti after their divorce. He also became involved in music as a Eurobeat singer under the stage name Kaioh (formerly known as Freddy Rodgers). Pasquini was married to Evelin Malferrari, from whom he obtained a divorce in 2020.

== Discography ==
=== Singles and album tracks ===
==== 1990s ====
Year	Title	Album
1992	Wild Heaven	TMN Song Meets Disco Style
1992	Come On Let's Dance	TMN Song Meets Disco Style
1992	Self Control	TMN Song Meets Disco Style
1992	Don't Let Me Cry	TMN Song Meets Disco Style
1992	Get Wild	TMN Song Meets Disco Style
1992	Resistance	TMN Song Meets Disco Style
1992	Come On Everybody	TMN Song Meets Disco Style
1992	Dive into Your Body	TMN Song Meets Disco Style
1992	Time to Count Down	TMN Song Meets Disco Style
1992	Love Train	TMN Song Meets Disco Style
1994	Sun City (feat. Jennifer Batten)	Maharaja Night HI-NRG Revolution 12
1995	Nothing Changed	Super Eurobeat 52
1995	Crimson Kiss	The Alfee Meets Dance
1995	Victory	The Alfee Meets Dance
1995	Sweat and Tears	The Alfee Meets Dance
1995	Fly (feat. Jennifer Batten)	Super Eurobeat 61
1996	Milan Milan Milan	Take Me Higher
1996	Music for the People (with Jennifer Batten)	Take Me Higher
1996	Woman from Tokyo	Take Me Higher
1996	I Was Made for Lovin' You	Super Eurobeat 71
1996	Boom Boom Japan	Super Eurobeat 72
1996	All I Want for Christmas Is You	Super Euro Christmas
1997	Take Me Higher	Take Me Higher
1997	Smoke on the Water	Take Me Higher
1997	Soul Gasoline	Take Me Higher
1997	I'll Be Your Hero	Take Me Higher
1997	Made in Japan	Take Me Higher
1997	Seventies	Take Me Higher
1997	Let It Be	Take Me Higher
1997	We Are the Champions (with A-Beat Friends)	Super Eurobeat 81
1998	Golden 70's Years	Super Eurobeat 84
1998	Space Boy	Super Eurobeat 87
1998	Kingdom of Rock	Super Eurobeat 89
1998	Go to the Top	Super Eurobeat 90 Anniversary Non-Stop Request Count Down 90!!
1998	Saturday Night Fever	Super Eurobeat 92
1998	Night Fever (with Mega NRG Man)	Super Eurobeat presents Initial D D Selection 2
1999	Beat of the Rising Sun	Super Eurobeat presents Initial D D Selection 3
1999	100	Super Eurobeat 99
1999	Merry Christmas Baby	Super Euro X'mas 2
1999	Deja Vu	Super Eurobeat presents Euromach 2

==== 2000s ====
Year	Title	Album
2000	The Final Countdown	Super Eurobeat 101
2000	Black Fire	Super Eurobeat 102
2000	Stay the Night	Super Eurobeat 103
2000	We Wanna Rock	Super Eurobeat 106
2000	You'll Be in My Heart	Eurobeat Disney
2000	Ale' Japan	Super Eurobeat 111
2001	Let's Go to the Show K2 the Auto Messe	Super Eurobeat 114
2001	Two Worlds	Eurobeat Disney 2
2001	Wheels of Fire	Super Eurobeat 115
2001	My Dream Team Is Verdy	Super Eurobeat 119
2001	Watch Me Dancing	Super Eurobeat 122
2001	Livin' La Vida Mickey	Eurobeat Disney 3
2001	True to Your Heart	Eurobeat Disney 3
2002	The Race Is Over	Super Eurobeat 124
2002	Fevernova (with Kiko Loureiro)	Super Eurobeat 129
2002	Dancing in the Starlight	Super Eurobeat 132
2003	Shake	Super Eurobeat 139
2004	Car of Your Dreams (with Nuage)	Super Eurobeat 144
2004	Not Gonna Get Us	Super Eurobeat 147
2004	Are We Gonna Be Together (with Meri)	Super Eurobeat 152
2005	Wild Reputation 2005	Super Eurobeat 156
2005	Don't Make Me Cry (with Nuage)	Super Eurobeat 159
2005	Space Invader	Super Eurobeat 161
2005	Eldorado	Super Eurobeat 162
2006	Make a Movement!!	Super Eurobeat 164
2006	Lucky Man	Super Eurobeat Presents Super GT 2006
2006	Ring of Fire (feat. Kiko Loureiro)	Super Eurobeat 166
2006	Love Me or Leave Me (with Nuage)	Super Eurobeat 167
2006	I Wanna Give You My Heart (with Meri)	Super Eurobeat 172
2006	Another Miracle (with Nuage)	Super Eurobeat 173
2007	Make Up Your Mind	Super Eurobeat 174
2007	Red Core (feat. Stef Burns)	Super Eurobeat 175
2007	Like a Video (with Nuage)	Super Eurobeat 176
2007	Watch Out	Super Eurobeat 177
2007	California Dreaming	Super Eurobeat 178
2007	The V.I.P. Is JP	Super Eurobeat 178
2007	Disco Fire	Super Eurobeat presents Initial D Battle Stage 2
2007	The Final Game (with Kiko Loureiro)	Super Eurobeat 182
2007	Tell Me (with Nuage)	Super Eurobeat 183
2008	Sun City 2008	Super Eurobeat 187
2009	Burning Like a Fire (feat. Alex de Rosso)	Super Eurobeat 195 ~Speedy~
2009	Love in the Elevator	Super Eurobeat 196 ~Vitamin Pop~
2009	Fire Dragon (feat. Patrick Rondat)	Super Eurobeat 197 ~King of Eurobeat~
2009	Dance in My Town (with Futura)	Super Eurobeat 199 ~Collaboration of Eurobeat~

==== 2010s / 2020s ====
Year	Title	Album
2010	Super Eurobeat (feat. Futura)	Super Eurobeat 201
2010	All Around the World (feat. M. Landau)	Super Eurobeat 202
2010	The Race Is the Game	Super Eurobeat 205
2010	The Race of the Night	Super Eurobeat 207
2010	Just Another Day with You (with Futura)	Super Eurobeat 209
2011	The House of Fire	Super Eurobeat 211
2011	Skylight	Super Eurobeat 215
2011	Sun Fire (with Futura)	Super Eurobeat 217
2013	1 Fire	Super Eurobeat 221
2013	I Want to Feel	Super Eurobeat Presents Initial D Fifth Stage D Selection Volume 1
2013	Into the Moon (with Futura)	Super Eurobeat 222
2013	Into the Sunrise	Super Eurobeat 223
2013	Magic Sunday (feat. Futura)	Super Eurobeat 225
2014	Money Money Money	Super Eurobeat 227
2014	New Race Game	Super Eurobeat 229
2015	Tell Me	Super Eurobeat 236
2016	Restarted Tonight	Super Eurobeat 239
2017	Break into the Music	Super Eurobeat 242
2018	Waiting for Love	
2018	Hydra	
2018	You Can Do Magic	
2018	Try to Fall in Love	
2018	Space Boy (2018)	
2018	Deja Vu (1:04 Mix)	
2019	Gold Night (feat. Eurobeat Union)	
2019	Misty Blue (feat. Eurobeat Union)	
2019	Don't Stop the Music (2019)	
2019	Kingdom Come (The Kingdom Mix)	
2019	Running in the 90's (Max Coveri cover)	
2019	Space Rocket	
2019	Spitfire	
2019	Deja Vu (2019)	
2019	In the Eye of the Tiger (with Kaioh)	
2019	Seventies (2020)	
2019	Music for the People (2020)	
2019	Gas Gas Gas (2020)	
2019	Space Boy (2020)	
2019	Beat of the Rising Sun (2020)	
2019	Soul Gasoline (2020)	
2022	MF Ghost	
2023	Flash Into the Night (ft. MOTSU)	
2024	2025	
2025	Bunta (You Are My Hero)	
2026	My car is in danger (with IRyS)	

=== As featured artist ===
Year	Title	Album
1997	Surrender (with Karen)	
1999	Could It Be Magic (with Karen)	
1999	Anniversary (with Domino and Virginelle)	
2001	Living in Peace (with Karen)	
2002	Contact (with Karen)	
2003	Get in Love (with Susy)	
2008	Unbelievable (with Annalise)	Super Eurobeat 192 ~Let's Party~
2020	Initial D Hell	
2023	GOLD	

=== Songs by Giancarlo Pasquini under the alias The Big Brother ===
- "Soul Gasoline"
- "Oh Oh Girls Are Dancing"
- "Wild Reputation"
- "Don't Go Breaking My Heart"
- "Rock and Roll"
- "Dancing in the Fire"
- "Big Time"
- "Ai No Corrida"
- "September"
- "Tears on My Eyes"
- "Red Fire"
- "L.A. Time"
- "Knock on Wood"

=== Songs by Giancarlo Pasquini under other aliases ===
- Raymond Barry - "Get Back"
- Chester - "Right Time"
- Dr. Money - "Give Up"
- Patrick Hooley - "Catching Your Time"
- Patrick Hooley - "Listen to Your Heart"
- Tommy J - "Desire"
- Manzi-Bellini - "In Your Eyes"
- Billy Mappy - "Get It On"
- Paul Murray - "Comedia"
- Red Skins - "Dance Around the Totem"
- Mario Ross - "More Illusions"
- Mario Ross - "Push Push Ballerina"
- RCS - "Rocking the City"
- Robert Stone - "Black Cars"
- Robert Stone - "Burning Heart"
- Robert Stone - "Dance Girl"
- Robert Stone - "Don't Give Up"
- Robert Stone - "Pocket Time"
- Robert Stone - "Welcome to the Jungle"
- Roby Benvenuto - "Gringo"
