= Dave and Domino =

Eurobeat duo

Dave and Domino are a eurobeat duo. They have appeared on the Super Eurobeat series including Super Euro X'mas and Eurobeat Disney 1–2. The names of the two singers are Giancarlo Pasquini and Alessandra Mirka Gatti (respectively).

== Family, hits, and music video ==
Giancarlo and Alessandra were married until 2004 when they divorced. They have one son, Federico Pasquini who sings under the name Kaioh. Dave and Domino had many hits including "I Believe In You", "Red Hot Zip", and "Sunshine In Your Eyes". "Sunshine In Your Eyes" is one of the few eurobeat songs to have a music video. The song's video was featured on Super Eurobeat Vol. 150 in a special DVD featuring interviews, music videos, and a history of parapara dancing.

== Post-Dave and Domino ==
The last song to be released under the duo "Dave and Domino" was "Sunshine In Your Eyes" on Super Eurobeat Vol. 145 on February 18, 2004. Domino left A-Beat C sometime in early 2003 (songs released on Super Eurobeat albums are delayed by 1–2 years) and reappeared on Super Eurobeat Vol. 164 with her song "Fuku Wa Uchi" which she produced with SCP in 2004. She also has produced "Ashiteru" with SCP, which was done for the J-Euro coverband Hinoi Team. Domino has now recently founded a new Eurobeat label, Go Go's Music (named after one of her previous group aliases, Go Go Girls), and is currently writing various new songs for singers like Elena Gobbi, Mega NRG Man, new Eurobeat artists, and for herself and the "Go Go Girls" name.

Dave Rodgers continued to record duets with female artists, carrying on the "Dave and Domino" tradition with Nuage. Some of these songs include "Don't Make Me Cry," "Car Of Your Dreams," etc. He has also produced a number of songs with famed Power metal guitarist, Kiko Loureiro. In 2009, his tradition project still keep to hold with his new wife Evelyn Malferrari (Futura) in pre-SunFire's A-Beat C (until SunFire founded in 2010).

== Discography ==
Year	Title	Album
1993	Wanted (with Edo)	Super Eurobeat 38
1995	Mary Ann	The Alfee Meets Dance
1995	Sweet Little Cinderella	The Alfee Meets Dance
1996	Friday Night	Maharaja Night HI-NRG Revolution 18
1999	Merry X'Mas	Super Euro X'Mas 2
1999	Happy X'Mas (War Is Over)	Super Euro X'Mas 2
2000	I Just Wanna Find You	Super Eurobeat 101
2000	I Believe in You	Super Eurobeat 107
2000	Red Hot Zip	Super Eurobeat 112
2000	Can You Feel The Love Tonight	Eurobeat Disney
2001	A Whole New World	Eurobeat Disney 2
2001	Nothing's Gonna Change My World	Super Eurobeat 115
2001	Give 'Em A Christmas Time	Super Euro X'Mas 3
2002	Don't Close Your Eyes	Super Eurobeat 125
2002	Shake Your Bell	Super Eurobeat 128
2002	Click Your Heart	Super Eurobeat 132
2003	Forever	Super Eurobeat 134
2003	Holy Night	Super Euro X'Mas 2003 Non-Stop Megamix
2004	Sunshine In Your Eyes	Super Eurobeat 145
2019	King & Queen	
2020	Never Gonna Give You Up	
2020	I Love You Like You Are	
2020	Another Day	
