= List of Para Para Paradise songs =

The following is the complete list of songs that have been featured in Para Para Paradise, a dancing music video game developed by Konami.

Included in each table is the title, artist, and recordings. This list is sorted by the versions the songs debuted on.

== ParaParaParadise 2ndMIX ==
Song name	Artist	Record label
Deja Vu	Dave Rodgers	A-Beat-C
Deltadance.com	Newfield-Moroni-Sinclaire	Delta Music Industry
Easy Busy	Kiki & Kika	SCP Music
I Believe in You	Dave & Domino	A-Beat-C
Jam Jam Jam	Kiki & Kika	SCP Music
Mikado	Dave McLoud	SCP Music
Number One	Fastway	SCP Music
Popteen	Domino	A-Beat-C
Sexy Sexy Sexy	Ken Martin	Boom Boom Beat
Take Me Now	Tommy K.	Time Records
Broken My Heart -super euro version-	Naoki with B4 ZA BEAT	KONAMI ORIGINAL
Ultra High-Heels -super euro version-	DJ TAKA with B4 ZA BEAT	KONAMI ORIGINAL

== ParaParaParadise1stMIXPlus ==
Song name	Artist	Record label
Mickey Mouse March	Domino	A-Beat-C
100	Dave Rodgers	A-Beat-C
Romeo & Juliet	Lolita	A-Beat-C
Burning Desire	Mega NRG Man	A-Beat-C
Go Godzilla Go	Ika	Time Records
Jealousy	Virginelle	A-Beat-C
My Sweet Banana	Go Go Girls	A-Beat-C
You Can Light My Fire	Madison	Delta Music Industry
Play with the Numbers	Domino	A-Beat-C
Don't Stand So Close	Dr. Love	Delta Music Industry
O Sole Mio	Go Go Girls	A-Beat-C
Station to Station	Derreck Simons	A-Beat-C
Money Go!	Marko Polo	Delta Music Industry
velfarre 2000	Bazooka Girls	Hi-NRG Attack / Live Music
Dancer	Mako	SinclaireStyle
Made of Fire	Niko	SinclaireStyle
Bandolero Comanchero	Franz Tornado and the "Mad Cow" Girls	Hi-NRG Attack / Live Music
Feeling of love -super euro version-	Yohei Shimizu with VENTURA	KONAMI EUROMIX from BEMANI SERIES
We Two Are One -super euro version-	Lala Moore with B4 ZA BEAT	KONAMI EUROMIX from BEMANI SERIES
Kiss Kiss Kiss -super euro version-	Naoki with B4 ZA BEAT	KONAMI EUROMIX from BEMANI SERIES

== ParaParaDancing ==
Korean release of ParaParaParadise. Compared of original release, I Wanna Dance and Tora Tora Tora were removed because of the censorship of Japanese lyrics in Korea, and Hold on me was replaced to Korean lyrics version. All new songs exclusive in this version are the songs from SM Entertainment with remixed to eurobeat style, only appearing in Freestyle mode.

Song name	Artist	Record label
Sara -super euro version-	BoA	
행복 -super euro version-	H.O.T.	
Go! H.O.T. -super euro version-	H.O.T.	
We are the future -super euro version-	H.O.T.	
너를 사랑해 -super euro version-	S.E.S.	
Oh My Love -super euro version-	S.E.S.	

== ParaParaParadise ==
Song name	Artist	Record label
Speedway	Niko	SinclaireStyle
Eurobeat	Dr. Love	SinclaireStyle
Night of Fire	Niko	SinclaireStyle
Try Me	Lolita	A-Beat-C
Yesterday	Cherry	SinclaireStyle
Like a Virgin	Virginelle	A-Beat-C
Tora Tora Tora	Domino	A-Beat-C
One Night in Arabia	Go Go Girls	A-Beat-C
Boom Boom Fire	D.Essex	SinclaireStyle
Crazy for You	Pizza Girl	Delta Music Industry
Remember Me	Leslie Parrish	Delta Music Industry
Stay	Victoria	Time Records
Kingdom of Rock	Dave Rodgers	A-Beat-C
Hold on me	tiger YAMATO	
Love Again Tonight -high speed mix-	Naoki feat. Paula Terry	
I Wanna Dance	Domino	A-Beat-C
Anniversary	Dave, Domino & Virginelle	A-Beat-C
Energy Love	Delta Queens	Delta Music Industry
Luv to Me disco mix -super euro version-	tiger YAMATO with Y&Co.	
Can't Stop Fallin' in Love -super euro version-	NAOKI with Y&Co.	
Dynamite Rave -super euro version-	NAOKI with Y&Co.	
デラックス	key-a-kiss	
アイシアッテマス？	key-a-kiss	
Ale' Japan	Dave Rodgers	A-Beat-C

== See also ==
- List of Eurobeat artists
