= Crazy for You =

Crazy for You may refer to:

== Music ==
- Crazy for You (musical), a 1992 musical comedy featuring the music of George and Ira Gershwin

=== Albums ===
- Crazy for You (Best Coast album), 2010
- Crazy for You (David Hasselhoff album), 1990
- Crazy for You (John Hicks album), 1992
- Crazy for You (Earl Klugh album), 1981

=== Songs ===
- "Crazy for You" (Hedley song)
- "Crazy for You" (Let Loose song)
- "Crazy for You" (Madonna song)
- "Crazy 4 U", a song by Kumi Koda
- "Crazy for You", a song by Adele from 19
- "Crazy for You", a song by Alexia from The Party
- "Crazy for You", a song by Eboni Foster
- "Crazy for You", a song by Hadise from Düm Tek Tek
- "Crazy for You", a song by David Hasselhoff
- "Crazy for You", a song by Incognito
- "Crazy for You", a song by NSYNC from 'N Sync
- "Crazy for You", a song by Pizza Girl from ParaParaParadise
- "Crazy for You", a song by Slowdive from Pygmalion
- "Crazy for You", a song by Tower of Power from Rhythm & Business

== Other uses ==
- Crazy for You (TV series), a Philippine soap opera
- Vision Quest (film), or Crazy for You, a 1985 film starring Matthew Modine and Linda Fiorentino
- Crazy for You, a shōjo manga by Karuho Shiina
- "Crazy for You" (The Flash), an episode of The Flash

== See also ==
- "Crazy on You"
