= Bemani Pocket =

- The logo for Bemani Pocket
- Developer: Bemani
- Publisher: Konami
- Platform: Handheld game console
- Release: JP: 1998–2002
- Genres: Music, rhythm
- Mode: Single-player

The Bemani Pocket (ビーマニポケット) is a brand of handheld video game devices created by Konami. They were introduced in the Japanese market during 1998 and they featured versions of most Bemani games, usually with an existing brand or franchise attached as advertisement. The most common releases were based on Beatmania with sixteen releases, with pop'n music and Para Para Paradise only receiving a single release.

Beginning in 1998, Bemani Pocket games were used by Nintendo in collaboration with St.GIGA as prizes for national Satellaview competitions and events.

On April Fools in 2018, Konami published a joke announcement of a jubeat pocket on Twitter.

== Releases ==
List of Bemani Pocket releases
Name	Release date	Notes
Beatmania Pocket	1998-12-23	First Bemani Pocket release.
Beatmania Pocket 2	1999-03-25	Features a rounder design than the original Beatmania Pocket. Most future Bemani Pocket's would follow this design.
Bemani Pocket Summer Mix	1999-07-25	
pop'n music Pocket	1999-08-26	
Dance Dance Revolution Pocket	1999-09-09	
Bemani Pocket Anime Song Mix ~Go Nagai and Dynamic Pro Edition~	1999-09-16	Featuring the songs of anime series created by Go Nagai.
Bemani Pocket Tokimeki Memorial	1999-10-28	Based on the dating simulation series Tokimeki Memorial.
Dance Dance Revolution Pocket Hello Kitty	1999-12-23	Based on the multimedia franchise Hello Kitty.
Dance Dance Revolution Pocket Dear Daniel	2000-02-03	Based on the Sanrio character Dear Daniel.
Bemani Pocket Anime Mix 2 ~Ishinomori Shotaro Edition~	2000-02-03	Featuring the songs of series created by Shotaro Ishinomori.
Bemani Pocket 2000	2000-04-20	
Bemani Pocket Hello Kitty	2000-05-18	Based on the multimedia franchise Hello Kitty.
Bemani Pocket Anime Mix 3 ~Matsumoto Leiji Edition~	2000-06-15	Featuring the songs of anime series created by Leiji Matsumoto.
Bemani Pocket ~Hanshin Tigers Attack~	2000-07-27	Based on the Hanshin Tigers baseball team.
Bemani Pocket Cawaii!	2000-08-10	Based on the gyaru fashion magazine Cawaii!
GuitarFreaks Pocket	2000-09-28	First Bemani pocket based on GuitarFreaks.
Dance Dance Revolution Pocket Winnie The Pooh	2000-10-26	Based on the multimedia franchise Winnie The Pooh.
Bemani Pocket Tokimeki Memorial 2	2000-12-14	Second Bemani Pocket to be based on Tokimeki Memorial.
Bemani Pocket Love Stories	2000-12-14	Songs are all themed around love.
Bemani Pocket KONAMIX	2001-01-18	Featuring songs from various Konami games.
Bemani Pocket BEST HITS 2000	2001-02-15	
GuitarFreaks Pocket 2	2001-05-24	Second and final GuitarFreaks Pocket release.
Para Para Paradise Pocket	2001-06-28	First and only Bemani Pocket to be based on Para Para Paradise.
Bemani Pocket ~Hanshin Tigers Great Attack~	2002-07-25	Second Bemani Pocket to be based on the Hanshin Tigers baseball team and the final Bemani Pocket release.
