= Gazen ParaPara!! =

Japanese album series

Gazen ParaPara!! (Japanese: 俄然パラパラ！！ also "Gazen ParaPara!! Paradise" or "Gazen ParaPara Gakuen") is the new wave of ParaPara merchandise from avex trax focused on Japanese teenagers. Several CD compilations are available, as well as ParaPara lesson DVDs, which are the first commercially released DVDs since the Para Para Paradise series.

== Gazen ParaPara!! CD Compilations ==
- Gazen ParaPara!! mixed by 9LoveJ (Japanese: 俄然パラパラ！！ mixed by 9LoveJ)
- Gazen ParaPara!! presents D-1 GRAND PRIX (Japanese: 俄然パラパラ！！ presents D-1 GRAND PRIX) +DVD
- Gazen ParaPara!! presents SUPER J-EURO BEST (Japanese: 俄然パラパラ！！ presents SUPER J-EURO BEST)
- Gazen ParaPara!! presents Campus Summit 2005 (Japanese: 俄然パラパラ！！ presents Campus Summit 2005) +DVD
- Gazen ParaPara!! presents D-1 Matsuri (Japanese: 俄然パラパラ！！ presents D-1祭) +DVD
- Gazen ParaPara!! presents Galpara (Japanese: 俄然パラパラ！！ presents ギャルパラ)
- Gazen ParaPara!! presents Campus Summit 2006 (Japanese: 俄然パラパラ！！ presents Campus Summit 2006) +DVD
- Gazen ParaPara Gakuen ~Fukushu-hen Best~ (Japanese: 俄然パラパラ学園 ～復習編ベスト～)
- Gazen ParaPara!! presents D-1 GRAND PRIX 2007 (Japanese: 俄然パラパラ！！ presents D-1 GRAND PRIX 2007) +DVD
- Gazen ParaPara!! presents Campus Summit 2007 (Japanese: 俄然パラパラ！！ presents Campus Summit 2007) +DVD
- The Best Of Gazen ParaPara & we♥TechPara 2CD+DVD

== Gazen ParaPara Gakuen DVD Series ==
- Gazen ParaPara Gakuen ~Nyuugaku-hen~ (Japanese: 俄然パラパラ学園 ～入学編～)
- Gazen ParaPara Gakuen ~ParaPara dayo! Zennin Shuugou-hen~ (Japanese: 俄然パラパラ学園 ～パラパラだよ！全員集合編～)
- Gazen ParaPara Juku ~Nyuumon-hen~ (Japanese: 俄然パラパラ塾 ～入門編～)
- Gazen Fainaru ! ~Chozen ParaPara Heno Michi~ (Japanese: 俄然ファイナル！～超然パラパラへの道～)

== Gazen ParaPara!! Magazines ==
- 俄然パラパラ！！BOOK (Magazine Book + DVD)
- 俄然パラパラ PARADISE (Magazine Book + DVD)

== Special Gazen ParaPara Releases ==
Due to some special campaigns, these DVD releases were either only available through contests or in limited quantity at retail stores.

- SUPER EUROBEAT x GAZEN PARAPARA!!
- Oboete Tanoshimeru 500yen ParaPara (Japanese: 覚えて楽しめる500円パラパラ)
- Gazen ParaPara Gakuen ~Tokubetsu Gentei-hen~ (Japanese: 俄然パラパラ学園 ～特別限定編～)

== See also ==
- Para para
