= Euro Shizuka Kudo =

EP by Shizuka Kudo
- Released: September 20, 2000
- Genre: Eurobeat
- Length: 18:24
- Label: Pony Canyon

Shizuka Kudo chronology
Millennium Best (2000)	Euro Shizuka Kudo (2000)	Shizuka Kudo Best (2001)

Euro Shizuka Kudo is the first and only remix album by Japanese singer Shizuka Kudo. It was released on September 20, 2000, through Pony Canyon. The EP features four of Kudo's hit songs remixed into Para Para-ready Eurobeat numbers. It was released as part of the Euro series by Pony Canyon, which only includes one other release, the EP Euro Onyanko, which gives the Eurobeat treatment to four songs by Onyanko Club. The EP was released after Kudo left Pony Canyon and moved to Extasy Japan and is not considered an official release on her side.

== Commercial performance ==
There is no publicity, and even the subject does not recognize its selected album Euro Shizuka Kudo debuted at number 72 on the Oricon Albums Chart, and charted for only one week, selling 3,000 copies.

== Track listing ==
All music is composed by Tsugutoshi Gotō

No.	Title	Lyrics	Remixer(s)	Length
1.	"Mugon... Iroppoi"	Miyuki Nakajima	Seiji Honma	5:12
2.	"Arashi no Sugao"	Yoshiko Miura	Honma	3:48
3.	"Kuchibiru Kara Biyaku"	Gorō Matsui	Honma	4:20
4.	"Dōkoku"	Nakajima	Honma	5:04
Total length:				18:24

== Charts ==
Chart (2000)	Peak position	Sales
Japan Weekly Albums (Oricon)	72	3,000
