= Eurobeat Disney 2 =

Compilation album by Various Artists
- Released: January 31, 2001
- Recorded: Walt Disney Records, Japan
- Genre: Eurobeat
- Length: 1:12:46
- Labels: Avex Group; Walt Disney Records
- Producers: Dave Rodgers; Brian Ice

Various Artists chronology
Eurobeat Disney (2000)	Eurobeat Disney 2 (2001)	Eurobeat Disney 3 (2001)

Eurobeat Disney 2 (ユーロビート・ディズニー２, Yūrobīto Dizunī Tsū) is the second of a series of compilation albums of various Disney songs which has been remixed in the style of eurobeat. It is produced by Walt Disney Records, and was only released in Japan. The album Eurobeat Disney 2 was released on January 31, 2001.

== Track listing ==
1. Dave & Domino - "A Whole New World" (Aladdin) - 4.18
2. Domino - "Colors of the Wind" (Pocahontas) - 4.07
3. Dave Rodgers - "Two Worlds" (Tarzan) - 4.40
4. Mega NRG Man - "Go the Distance" (Hercules) - 4.24
5. Susan Bell - "Part of Your World" (The Little Mermaid) - 4.52
6. Mickey B. - "Reflection" (Mulan) - 4.33
7. Susan Bell feat. Powerful T. - "If I Never Knew You" (Pocahontas) - 4.00
8. Mickey B. - "Circle of Life" (The Lion King) - 4.01
9. Domino - "Some Day My Prince Will Come" (Snow White and the Seven Dwarfs) - 4.21
10. Brian Ice - "Someday" (The Hunchback of Notre Dame) - 4.31
11. Norma Sheffield - "Once Upon a Dream" (Sleeping Beauty) - 4.06
12. Domino - "A Dream Is a Wish Your Heart Makes" (Cinderella) - 4.13
13. Powerful T. - "So This Is Love" (Cinderella) 4.20
14. Matt Land - "Mickey and Minnie on a Moonlit Night" (from the album Rock Around the Mouse) - 4.26
15. Mega NRG Man feat. Dave Rodgers - "Ducks Dance Too" (from the album Mousercise) - 3.53
16. Domino feat. TJ Davis - "Mickey Motion" (from the album Rock Around the Mouse) - 4.01
17. Domino - "Mickey Mouse March (Springtime Extended Version)" (The Mickey Mouse Club) -4.09
