= Dive into Disney =

Studio album by Various Artists
- Released: October 30, 2002
- Genre: Punk rock; ska
- Label: Avex Group; Walt Disney Records

Various Artists chronology
Dive into Disney (2002)	Mosh Pit On Disney (2004)

Dive into Disney is a Japanese compilation cover album containing punk rock and ska renditions of various Disney songs, such as Mickey Mouse Club March, Hakuna Matata, and It's a Small World, performed by various artists. All of the songs are recorded in English.

== Track listing ==
No.	Title	Artist	Length
1.	"Mickey Mouse March"	Beat Crusaders
2.	"Yo Ho (A Pirate's Life for Me)"	Snuff
3.	"Main Street Electrical Parade"	Reel Big Fish
4.	"It's a Small World"	H_{2}O
5.	"When You Wish Upon a Star"	The Band Apart
6.	"Baby Mine"	Husking Bee
7.	"Chim Chim Cher-ee"	ALL
8.	"Forever and Ever"	Asparagus
9.	"I Wan'na Be like You"	Voodoo Glow Skulls
10.	"Supercalifragilisticexpialidocious"	Oi-Skall Mates
11.	"Go the Distance"	Doping Panda
12.	"Bibbidi-Bobbidi-Boo"	Spoony
13.	"Hakuna Matata"	Rude Bones
14.	"Someone's Waiting for You"	Tsutchie featuring Mayu Kitaki
