= Eurobeat Disney =

Compilation album by Various Artists
- Released: July 26, 2000
- Recorded: Walt Disney Records
- Genre: Eurobeat
- Length: 1:13:53
- Label: Avex Group; Walt Disney Records
- Producer: Dave Rodgers; TJ Davis; Sandro Olivia

Various Artists chronology
Eurobeat Disney (2000)	Eurobeat Disney 2 (2001)

Eurobeat Disney (ユーロビート・ディズニー, Yūrobīto Dizunī) is the first of a series of compilation albums of various Disney songs which has been remixed in the style of eurobeat. It was released exclusively in Japan. Produced by Italian singer Dave Rodgers for Walt Disney Records, the first Eurobeat Disney was released on July 26, 2000. Some of the songs on this album are featured in the game Dance Dance Revolution Disney Mix and were part of the special event "Club Disney Super Dancin' Mania" at Tokyo Disneyland in 2000.

Eurobeat Disney was later followed up with Eurobeat Disney 2 and Eurobeat Disney 3.

== Track listing ==
1. Domino - "Mickey Mouse March" (Eurobeat Version) (The Mickey Mouse Club) - 4:21
2. Domino - "Macho Duck" (from the album Mickey Mouse Disco) - 4:42
3. ABeatC All Stars - "It's a Small World" (Disneyland's It's a Small World) 4:16
4. Derreck Simons - "Under the Sea" (The Little Mermaid) - 5:01
5. King & Queen - "Winnie the Pooh" (The Many Adventures of Winnie the Pooh) - 4:27
6. Domino - "Beauty and the Beast" (Beauty and the Beast) - 4:22
7. Go Go Girls - "Supercalifragilisticexpialidocious" (Mary Poppins) 4:08
8. Matt Land - "Heigh-Ho" (Snow White and the Seven Dwarfs) - 4:15
9. Dave Rodgers - "You'll Be in My Heart" (Tarzan) - 4:24
10. Domino - "Bibbidi-Bobbidi-Boo" (Cinderella) - 4:00
11. Brian Ice - "He Lives in You" (The Lion King II: Simba's Pride) - 4:41
12. Domino - "Chim Chim Cher-ee" (Mary Poppins) - 4:34
13. Mega NRG Man - "You've Got a Friend in Me" (Toy Story) - 4:24
14. Domino - "Zip-a-Dee-Doo-Dah" (Song of the South) 4:29
15. Dave & Domino - "Can You Feel the Love Tonight" (The Lion King) - 4:12
16. Lolita - "When You Wish upon a Star" (Pinocchio) - 4:10
17. Domino - Mickey Mouse March (Summertime Extended Version) - 3:37
