= Velfarre =

Disco located in Japan

Coordinates: 35.663981°N 139.730898°E

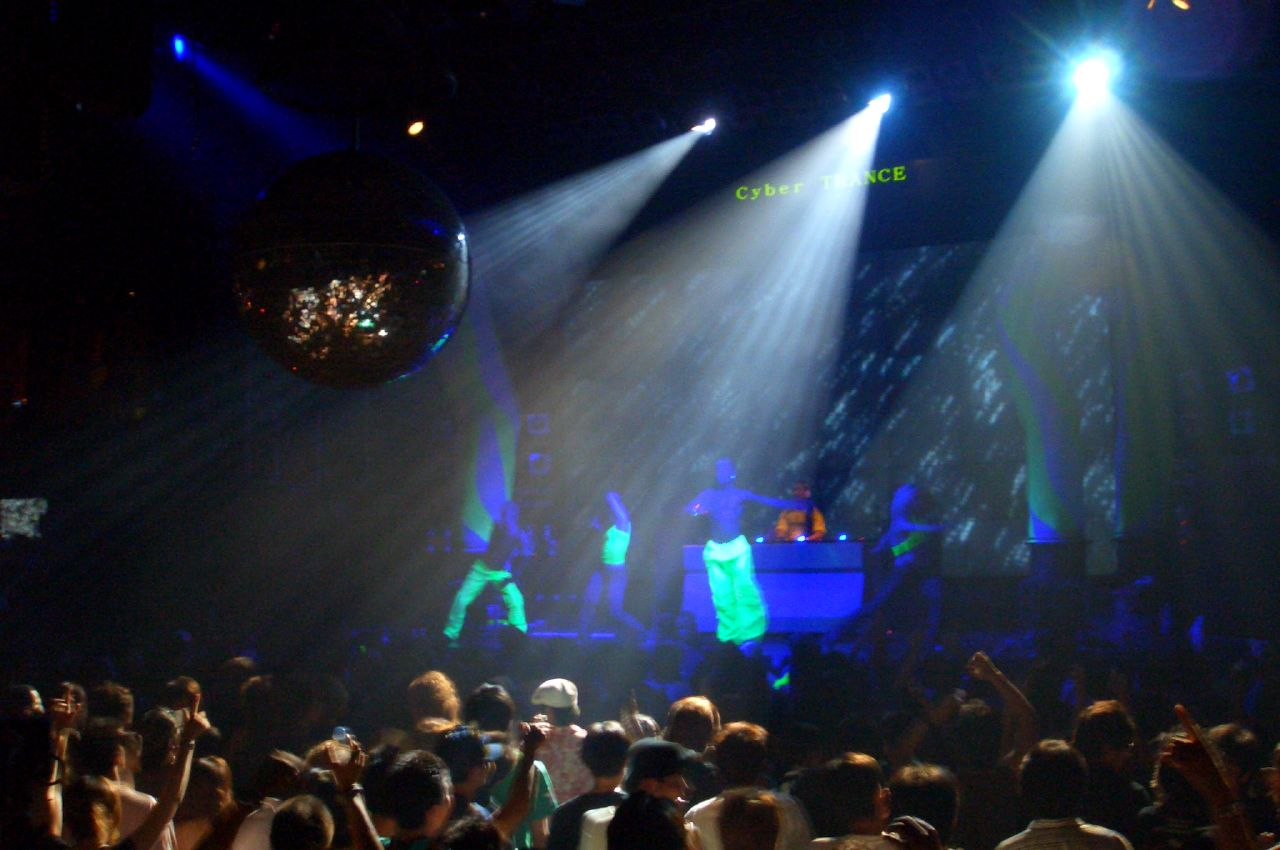
- Velfarre interior in 2005
- Address: 14-22 Roppongi 7-chome Tokyo; Japan
- Owner: Avex Inc.
- Capacity: 1,500
- Type: Discotheque

Construction
- Opened: December 2 1994
- Closed: January 1 2007
- Years active: 1994-2007

Website
- https://velfarre.avex.co.jp/

Velfarre (ヴェルファーレ, Verufāre) was a dance club located in the Roppongi district of Tokyo, Japan. Velfarre was the self-professed "largest disco in Asia" with a capacity of 1,500 people, with three floors above ground and three floors below; the club was owned by Tetsuya Komuro and Avex Trax. Velfarre was known for trance, Eurobeat, techno, Para Para, and disco related events. Velfarre held concerts for Avex Trax artists, and was able to be rented for private events. Masahiro Origuchi, the club's founder, stated that Velfarre was a combination of the brand names Versace, Ferrari, and Armani.

== Influence ==
Velfarre played a significant role in the Para Para scene. In 1998, Velfarre hosted its first Para Para event called SEF HYPER, SEF being an acronym for Super Euro Flash. The weekly Para Para event at Velfarre underwent two name changes over the years, first changing to SEF MACH! (from the 3rd Para Para boom) and later SEF GOLD.

Hi-NRG Attack Studios produced several Eurobeat songs dedicated to Velfarre, including:

- Velfarre 2000 by Bazooka Girl
- Hey Hey Velfarre by Bazooka Girl
- Super Euro Flash by Franz V.I.P. Tornado & Bazooka T.C.V. Girl
- Everybody Velfarre by Bazooka Girl
- The Class Of Velfarre by Bazooka Girl
- Velfarre 2006 by Garcon
- Velfarre 10 by Franz Tornado & Bazooka Girl

TCV stands for The Class of Velfarre; the nickname of Velfarre's VIP Floor.

Velfarre hosted many world-class trance DJs, such as Johan Gielen and Ferry Corsten. Trance was a fundamental part of Velfarre. John Robinson [ja] first introduced it at Millenia and PLANET LOVE. Cyber Trance was a natural evolution from the movement started by John Robinson at PLANET LOVE. When Gielen was working under Robinson as a resident DJ from 1995 to 1997, trance was a major part of their sets. Gielen was at the final Cyber Trance at Velfarre; Robinson was the DJ for the final New Year countdown. Gielen played after Robinson, followed by a succession of DJs who had played at Velfarre over the years before Robinson returned at 11am to play the club's final set before its closure.

== Albums ==
Avex released its first Velfarre CD "Velfarre Volume 1 - Welcome To The Future" in February 1995. This release was the first in a series of discs, which was the replacement for the "Juliana's Tokyo" mix CDs. The importance of the mix CDs cannot be understated ~ without the Juliana's Tokyo series, there would be no Avex or Velfarre as that was what provided the seed money for the rapid growth of the company. (Both series were mixed and produced by DJ John Robinson who was also the head DJ at both clubs. He was later rewarded for his efforts by being appointed to the board of directors of Velfarre). "Disco Week in Velfarre" also released in 1995 was bundled with an Avex J-POP concert album titled "TK DANCE CAMP" to make up a 2-CD set titled "AVEX DANCE MATRIX `95 LIVE". "Disco Week in Velfarre" was also the first velfarre video release in VHS/LD featuring performances by International and Japanese performers. And additional performances not found on the CD version. In 1997, with the success of the "J-POP NIGHT" events at Velfarre", Avex released "VELFARRE J-POP NIGHT presents DANCE with you" which featured MAX, SPEED, D&D and many others singing a Eurobeat rendition of classic J-POP songs by Pink Lady, Finger Five and more.

Velfarre's influence in the Cyber Trance genre prompted Avex Trax to release a moderately successful series of non-stop Trance mixes bearing velfarre's name. The first album in the series did not bear the velfarre name, released simply as "Cyber Trance" on July 4, 2001. The first album bearing velfarre's name is actually the second album in the series, "velfarre Cyber TRANCE 01 ～BEST HIT TRANCE～", released November 7, 2001. Whether series will continue after velfarre's closing is unknown. The most recent release in the series to date is a 2 CD+DVD box set titled, "Velfarre Cyber Trance Complete Collection" and "Velfarre complete best 1994-2006" which is a 6-CD box set featuring the different types of music from velfarre past broken down to groups such as "Hyper Techno Floor", "Hyper Trance Floor", "Dance Pop Floor", "Eurobeat Floor", "Disco House Floor" and "After Hours Floor" and including a booklet detailing the history of velfarre.

Legend has it that Ayumi Hamasaki first met her future producer, Max Matsuura, one night at velfarre. Ayumi was known to frequent velfarre in her teenage years.

Earth, Wind & Fire recorded a live album, Greatest Hits Live, at Velfarre in 1995.

== Closing ==
Promotional poster for the last events held at Velfarre, as seen in Roppongi, Tokyo.

Velfarre opened on December 2, 1994 and closed their doors on January 1, 2007. After 12 years of operation, Velfarre was forced to close as the lease on the land that the club was built on could not be renewed.

On December 31, 2006, Velfarre hosted its final countdown event, "Countdown to the Future", and on January 1, 2007, featured "the LAST DANCE", the final event for velfarre and the first dance of 2007. Velfarre closed its doors and ended its 12-year history at noon on January 1, 2007.

At the Cyber Trance FINAL event on 30 December 2006, Komuro Tetsuya stated on stage that, "Velfarre will be back!".

In July 2011, Niwango, the operator of Nico Nico Douga, started operating "Nicofarre" at the same place but with a smaller size. The new club has five LED wallscreens that project comments to the crowd, much like Niconico's comment system. "Nicofarre" ended its business at the end of July 2019.
