= Bemani =

Konami's music video game division

- Native name: ビーマニ
- Romanized name: Bīmani
- Formerly: Game Machine Division (1997–1999)
- Type: Division
- Industry: Video games
- Founded: 1997; 29 years ago
- Headquarters: Tokyo, Japan
- Products: Beatmania; Beatmania IIDX; BeatStream; Dance Around; Dance Dance Revolution; Dance Dance Revolution Solo; Dance Maniax; Dancerush Stardom; Gitadora (GuitarFreaks and DrumMania); Jubeat; Karaoke Revolution; Keyboardmania; Mambo a Go Go; Múseca; Nostalgia; Para Para Paradise; Pop'n Music; Reflec Beat; Sound Voltex
- Parent: Konami

Bemani (Note: Japanese: ビーマニ, Hepburn: Bīmani; /biːˈmɑːni/), stylized in all caps, is Konami's music video game division. Originally named the Game Machine Division (G.M.D.), it changed its name in honor of its first and most successful game, Beatmania, and expanded into other music-based games, most notably rhythm games such as Dance Dance Revolution, GuitarFreaks, and DrumMania.

== Video game series ==
Since 1997, Konami has published a variety of music game series under their Konami G.M.D. and Bemani brands. These game series have distinctive user interfaces and game controllers. The controllers in the Beatmania series simulate a DJ mixer and direct-drive turntable. ParaParaParadise is controlled by activating motion sensors with one's hands and arms. The controllers in GuitarFreaks and DrumMania simulate a guitar and drum set, respectively.

=== Beatmania ===
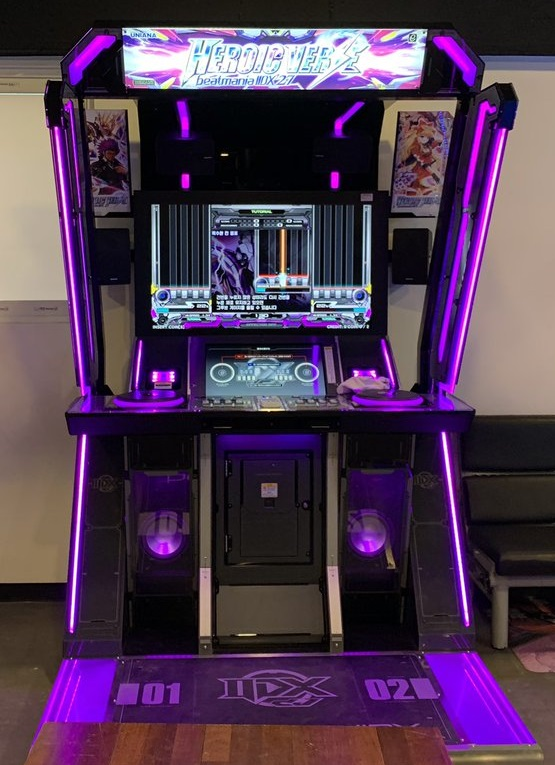
Beatmania IIDX 27: Heroic Verse (2019) running on a Lightning Model arcade cabinet

Launched in Japanese video arcades in December 1997, Beatmania was Konami G.M.D.'s first game series and franchise. The original Beatmania game was an immediate hit. Within a year's time, there were five installments in the series in video arcades in East Asia and North America, and three home console titles for the Sony PlayStation. Within two years, there were at least 30 Beatmania variations in arcades, on home consoles, and on handheld game consoles.

The franchise encompasses such series as Beatstage for the South Korean market; HipHopMania in North America; the Bemani Pocket titles for Konami's own Bemani Pocket console in Japan; the Beatmania IIDX series; as well as Beatmania III (2000) and its variants.

=== Dance Around ===
Dance Around, stylized as DANCE aROUND, was released on March 3, 2022, in Japan. Internationally, it was released on June 6, 2022 in North America and in December 2022 in China. The game is named after Round One arcades, and it is exclusive to these arcades. Dance Around uses a pair of cameras mounted on either side of the cabinet to detect the player's body using parallax. Dance Around is considered by fans to be a spiritual sequel to Bemani's own Dance Masters and Dance Evolution Arcade, and is also comparable to the Just Dance game series.

=== Dance Dance Revolution ===
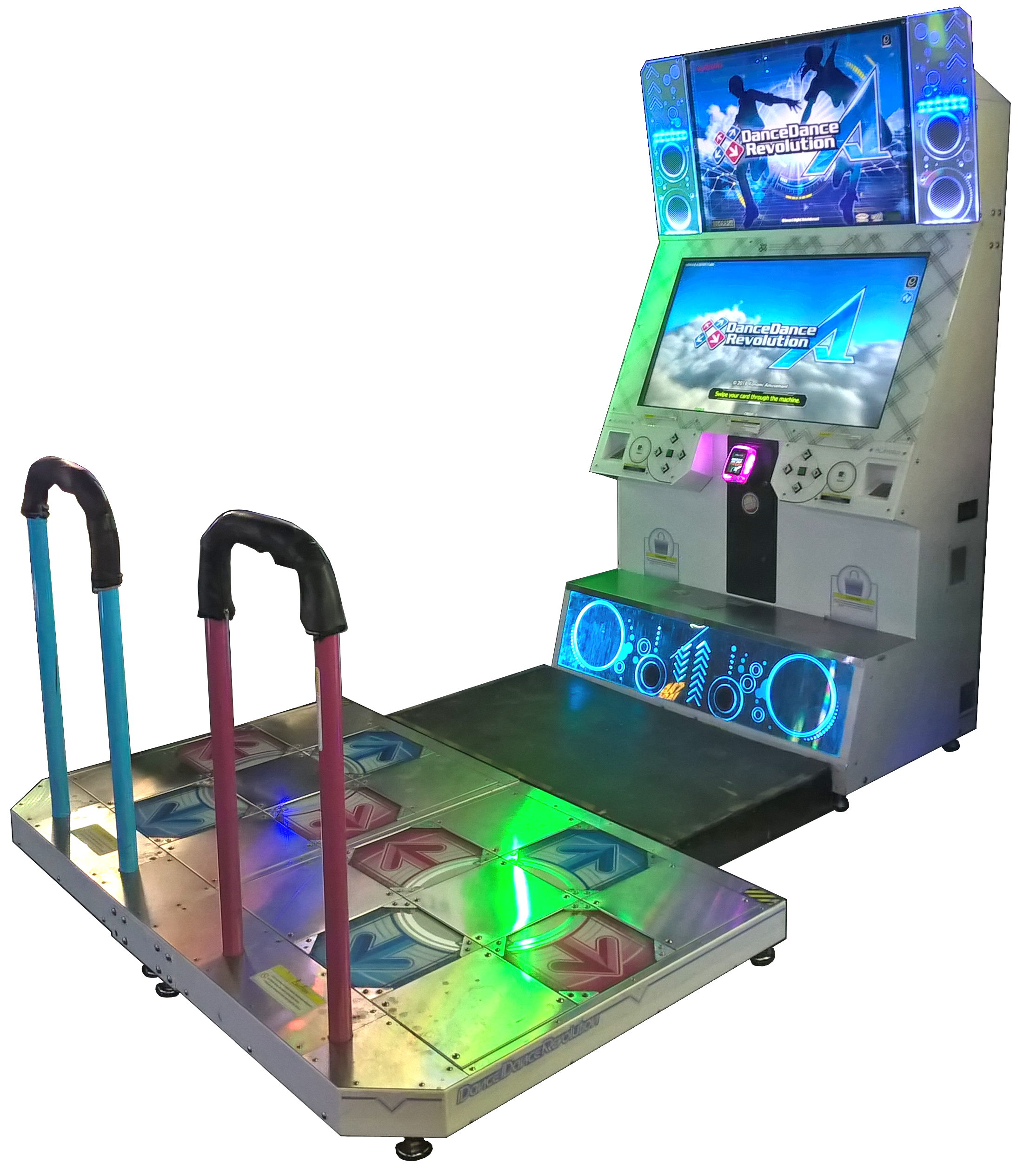
A Dance Dance Revolution White arcade cabinet

Dance Dance Revolution, often initialized to DDR and also known in Europe as Dancing Stage, was first produced in 1998. The game is played by stepping to music on a dance platform with four pressure-sensitive arrow pads. The game has changed little since its introduction but has come a long way in terms of musical selection and visual appearance. While originally an arcade title, many versions of Dance Dance Revolution have been released on many different platforms including the Sony PlayStation 2, Sega Dreamcast, Nintendo Wii, and Microsoft Xbox. Other versions have also appeared on portable handhelds, cell phones, and as standalone TV plug'n'play devices. Dance Dance Revolution is commonly considered to be the most well-known BEMANI series outside of Japan.

=== Dance Rush ===
Dance Rush Stardom, stylized as DANCERUSH STARDOM, was first released on March 23, 2018. It is marketed as a shuffle dancing simulator, and encourages the players to learn several real-life moves, such as the running man, the crab step, the SpongeBob, and the Charleston. It uses a Microsoft Kinect-like body tracking camera and a dance platform powered by an IR frame. In addition, Dance Rush has five buttons for navigating the menu, but not used during gameplay.

In Dance Rush, the player is given a set of prompts that scroll down the timeline, and must match the horizontal foot positions by stepping in the right place on the platform, sliding their feet left and right, or keeping their feet off the platform by jumping. In addition, the game also detects the speed at which the player's center of gravity moves, requiring the player to go "DOWN" in time with the prompts.

Similar to other Bemani series like Dance Dance Revolution and Dance Evolution, Dance Rush has three game modes: Light (up to two songs, or only one in South Korea), Standard (up to two songs, plus Extra Stage if the total score for the two songs exceeds 180.000) and Premium (record any one song fulfilling the license terms and upload them to YouTube).

Dance Rush also has a cooperative 2-player mode, where one player uses the front half of the platform and the other uses the back half, as well as a head-to-head battle mode using two separate cabinets. The two modes can even be activated at the same time, resulting in a 2v2 cooperative multiplayer game.

=== Gitadora (GuitarFreaks and DrumMania) ===
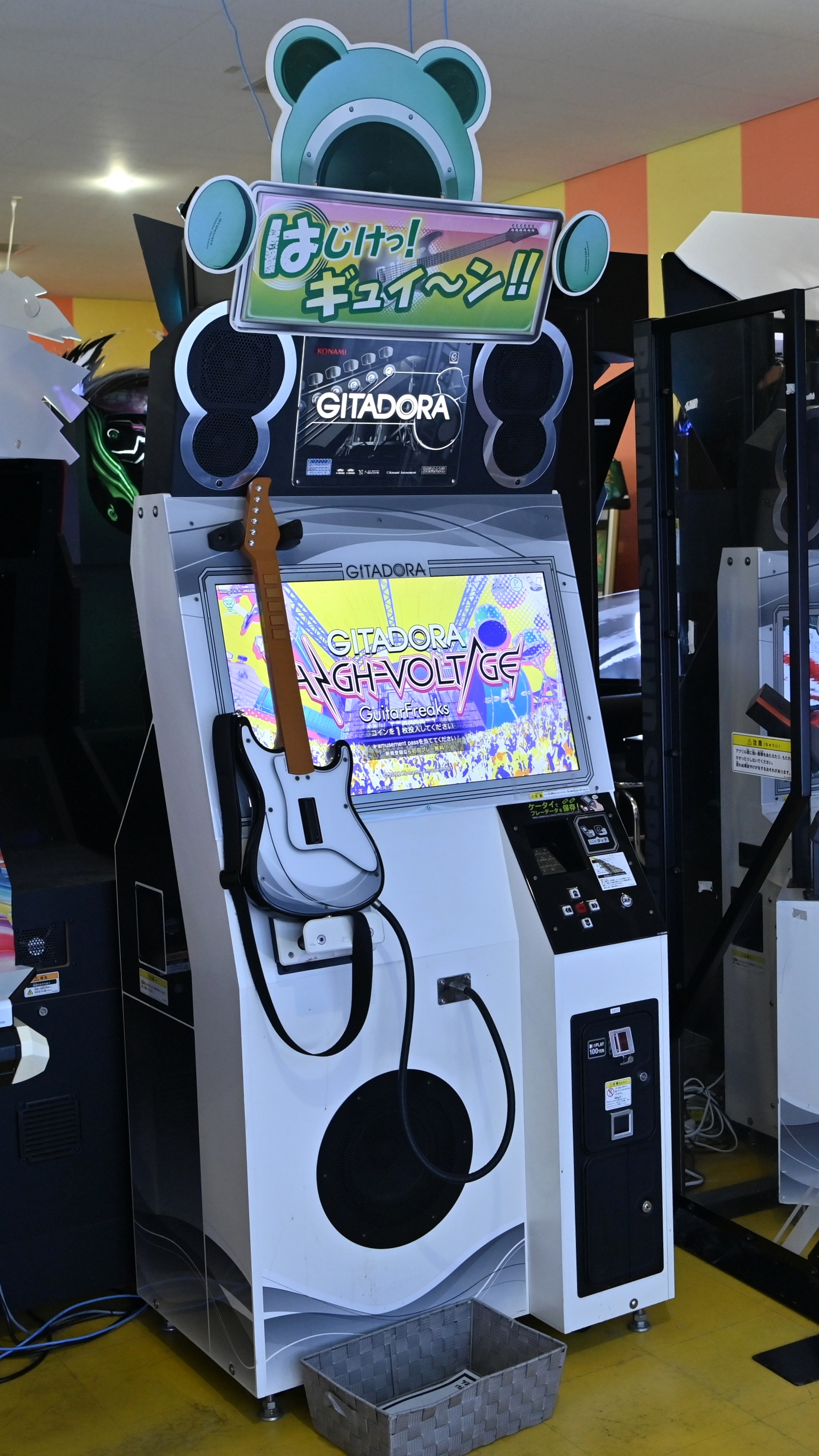
A GITADORA HIGH-VOLTAGE GuitarFreaks machine

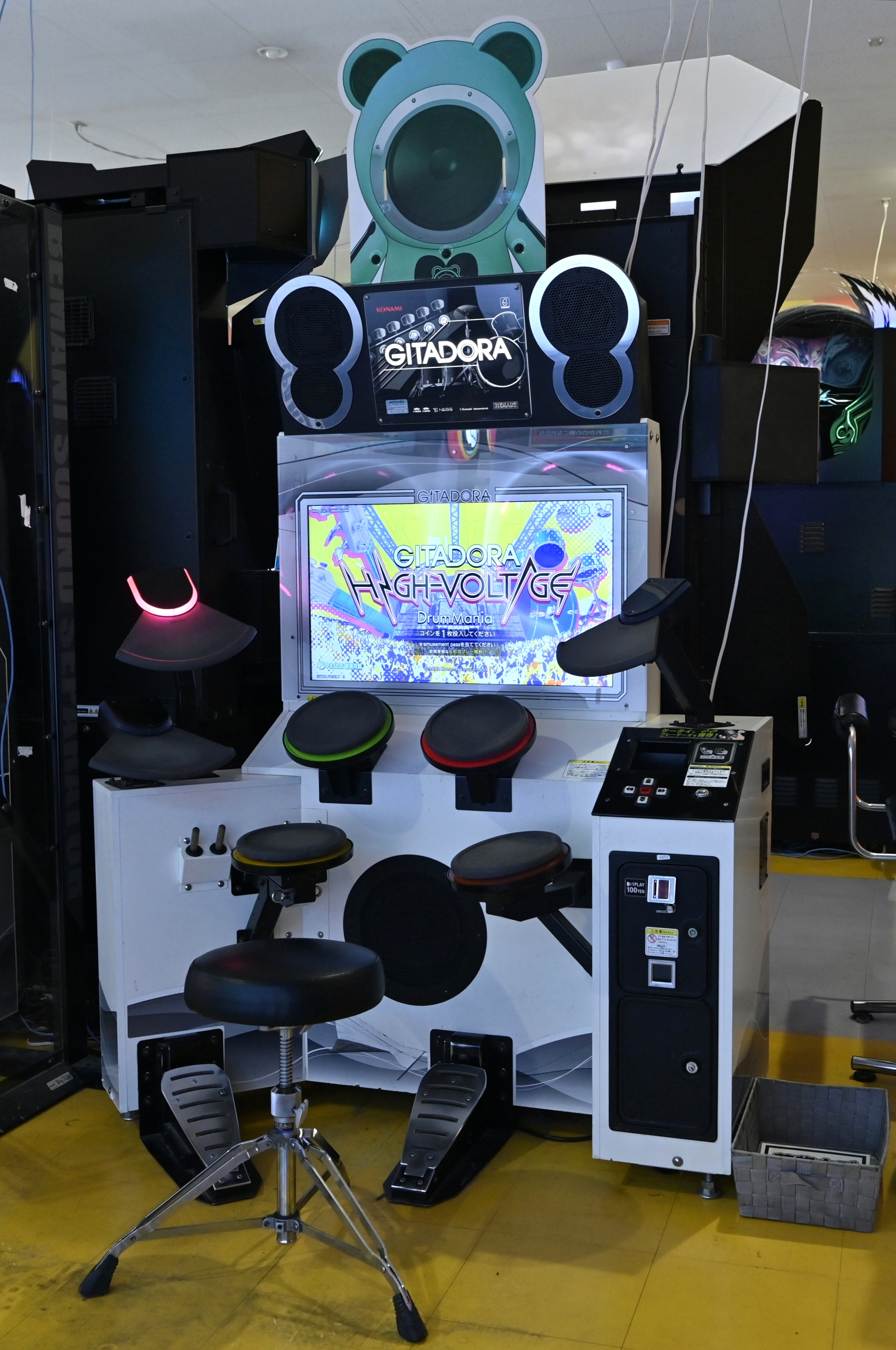
A GITADORA HIGH-VOLTAGE DrumMania machine

Also known as Gitadora in Japan, the combined series of GuitarFreaks and DrumMania are games that use simplified instruments after their namesake. GuitarFreaks uses a small, plastic guitar with three buttons known as "frets", a strum bar, and a motion sensor that players set off by pulling the neck of the guitar up and quickly down again. Despite the similarities, Guitar Freaks predates Guitar Hero by several years; in fact, the heads of RedOctane, Charles and Kai Huang, were reportedly inspired by the GuitarFreaks gameplay to develop the Western game's guitar peripheral and pitch its gameplay proposal for what would eventually become Guitar Hero.

Drum Mania lets players play a set of drums. Modeled after modern digital drum kits, the player strikes the appropriate piece with the drumsticks on cue with the music and failure to do so causes the song to sound incorrect. Many American players will recognize the Drum Mania setup from more recent games like Rock Band, which is unrelated to the Konami game.

Similar to the 5-key to 7-key upgrade from Beatmania to Beatmania IIDX, GuitarFreaks and DrumMania received a major gameplay overhaul with the 2010 release of GuitarFreaks XG and DrumMania XG, with a total of five frets and nine drums respectively. While standard GuitarFreaks and DrumMania games were originally being released alongside the XG games, the latter has now become the primary focus of the series, with the last standard series game being V8, released in 2011. The XG series was rebranded in 2013 as simply GITADORA.

Despite being separately released games that can be played independent of each other, Konami markets the GITADORA series as a pair that can be linked for co-operative play in the arcades. The two series continue to be released to this day.

=== Jubeat ===
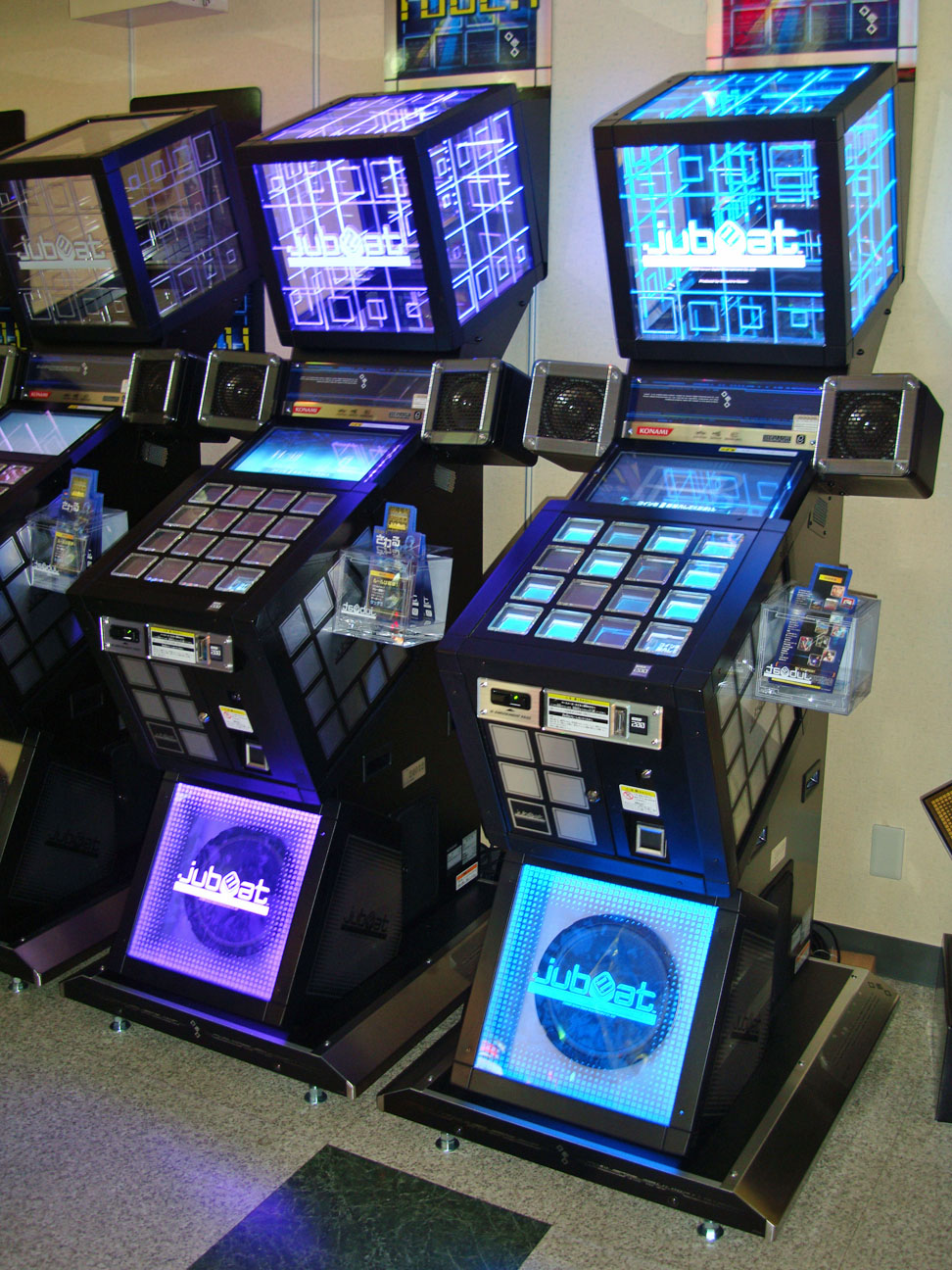
Jubeat arcade cabinets

Announced on December 22, 2007, Jubeat (pronounced "you beat"; title changed to UBeat and Jukebeat in the American test releases) is similar to Whac-A-Mole, where players must tap the square-shaped panels on a touch screen when they light up. It was released in Japan in July 2008. A localized version of the game for North America was announced the month after with tests held at an arcade in Southern California alongside Dance Dance Revolution X. After two separate testing phases Konami canceled all plans to release the game in North American arcades. Jubeat's arcade presence is localized in Japan and several East Asian countries. Free-to-play adaptations for mobile were eventually released in 2010. Japan received Jubeat Plus, available for iOS and Android. International regions received a localized version called Jukebeat, available solely on iOS. While the apps may appear similar, Jukebeat's songlist is far more restricted and features different licences.

=== NOSTALGIA ===
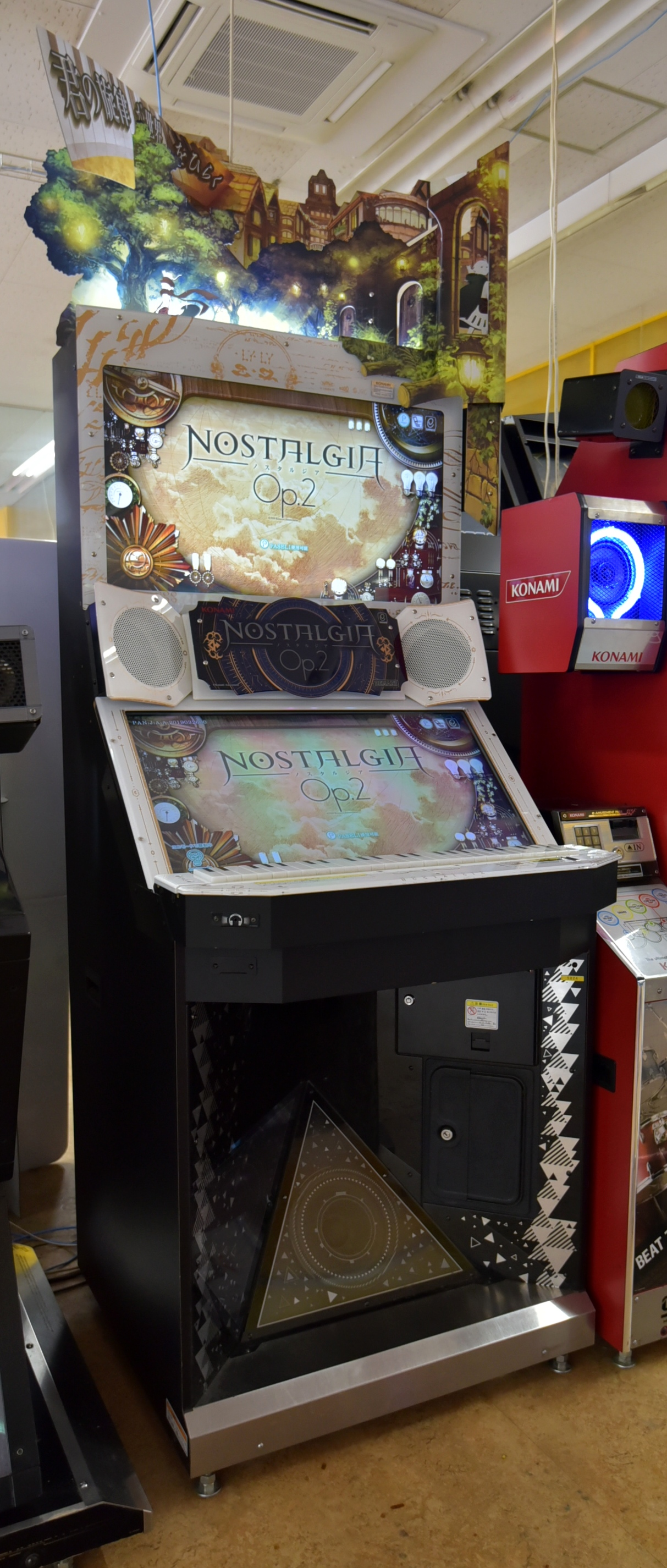
A NOSTALGIA arcade cabinet

NOSTALGIA (ノスタルジア, Nosutarujia) was first released on March 1, 2017, available as an upgrade kit for BeatStream cabinets or as a new machine. The game serves as a spiritual successor to Keyboardmania, with its gameplay involving a keyboard-esque controller used to hit notes coming from the top of the screen. Unlike Keyboardmania though, the player does not have to hit a specific key, just one in the note's general area. Only one row of keys is used as well; while the cabinet does have black keys, they are solely for decoration. The touchscreen used by BeatStream is reused to navigate the game's interface. Similar to Keyboardmania, "real" charts require players to know how to play the piano in order to easily pass the songs. Four arcade (AC) versions were released: 1st, FORTE, Op.2, and Op.3.

=== Pop'n Music ===
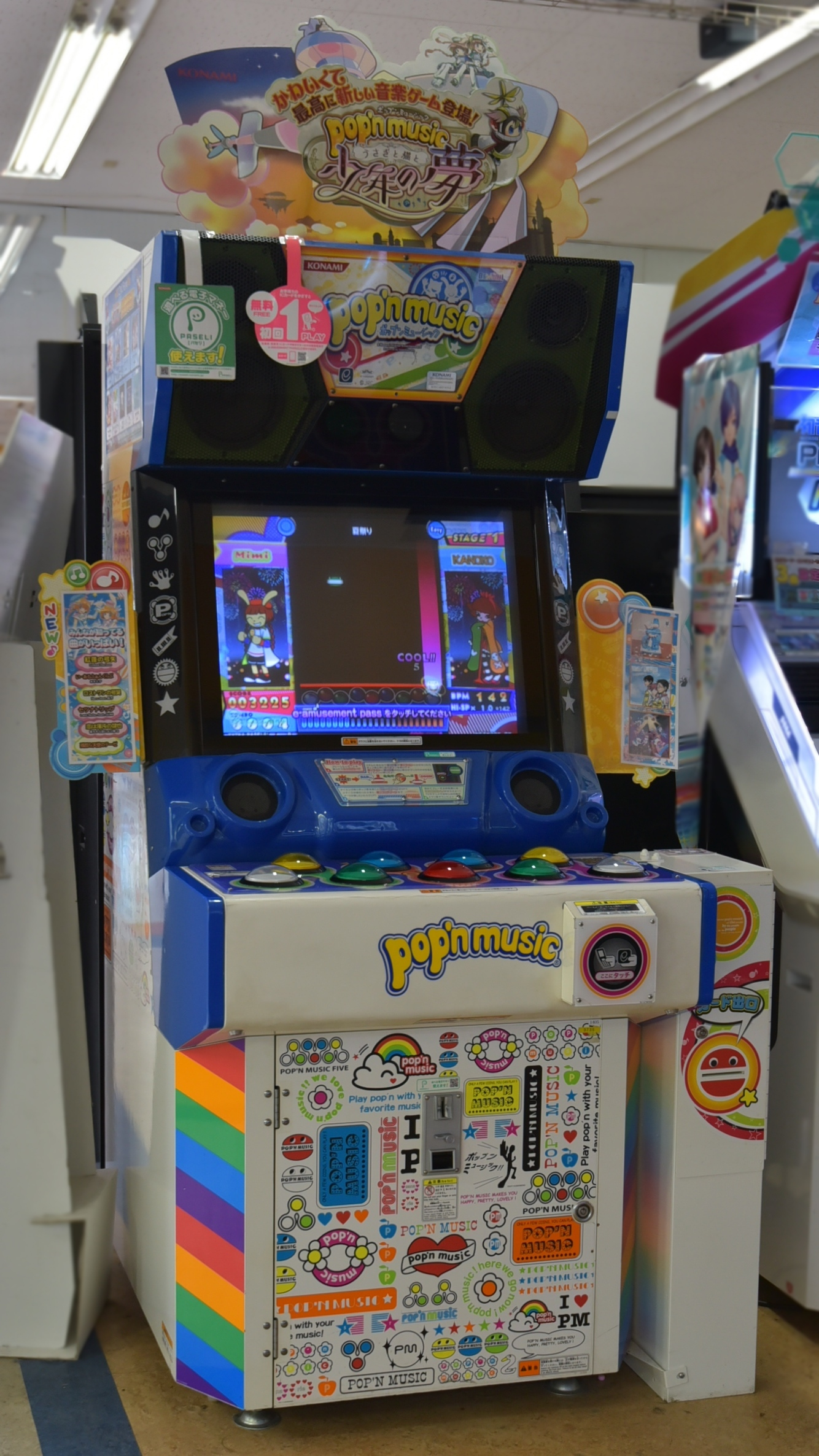
A Pop'n Music arcade cabinet

Released in 1998, Pop'n Music is like a simplified Beatmania. With larger, colorful buttons, no turntable, and easier note patterns, Pop'n Music presents players with a more childlike appearance. However Pop'n Music is viewed as every bit as difficult as Beatmania IIDX, with modes that use up to nine hand buttons at once, and having some songs that are not keysounded. Pop'n Music is stylized with cute cartoony characters and a musical selection to match. The series continues to this day as one of the most popular Bemani games.

=== Sound Voltex ===
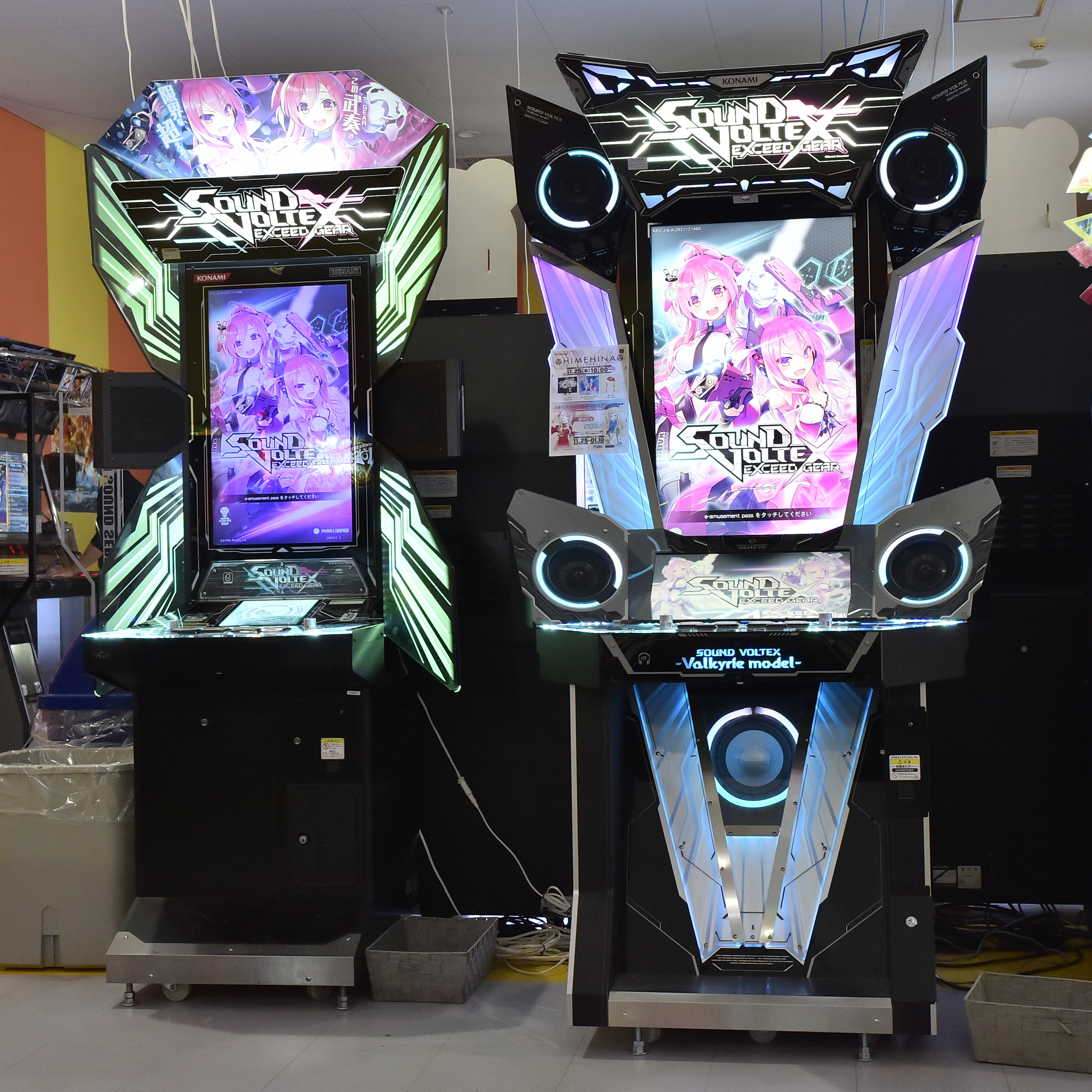
Two SOUND VOLTEX arcade cabinets, the standard model at left and the Valkyrie model at right, both running EXCEED GEAR

Sound Voltex was first released on January 18, 2012. Its gameplay involves four white buttons, two orange "FX" buttons, and two knobs, one blue and one pink. While the white and orange buttons are simply pressed or held, the knobs must be adjusted on cue with blue and pink lasers which quickly move left and right across the track. Similar to beatmania, this gameplay is meant to mimic a DJ controller, but places more focus on layering effects over the music. Besides music featured in other BEMANI series, many songs are arrangements of music from Touhou Project, and some are produced by Vocaloid artists. SOUND VOLTEX also holds regular song contests, officially called SOUND VOLTEX FLOOR, in which fans submit original songs or artwork for a chance to be part of the game's extensive songlist.

== Inactive Bemani games ==
=== Beatmania ===
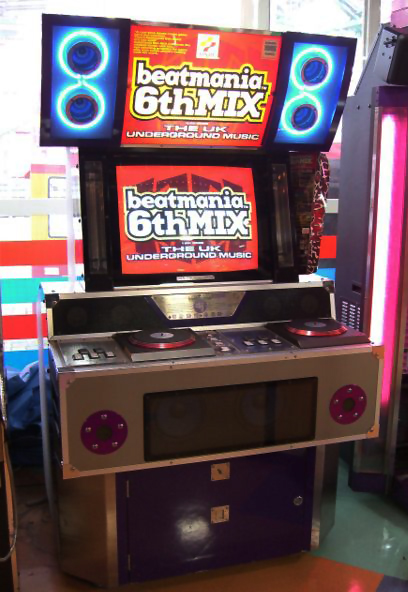
A Beatmania 6th mix arcade cabinet

Modeled after nightclub DJs and mixing boards, Beatmania, known as Hip Hop Mania in North America and Beatstage in Korea, allows the player to "spin" the music with five activator keys and a turntable. The Beatmania series was the first Bemani game introduced and its successor is still the most popular Bemani game in Japan. With numerous releases in arcades and on video game platforms Beatmania set itself as a role model for future Bemani titles. The music featured in this series of games is still in use today in Beatmania IIDX and other Bemani games.

=== Beatmania III ===
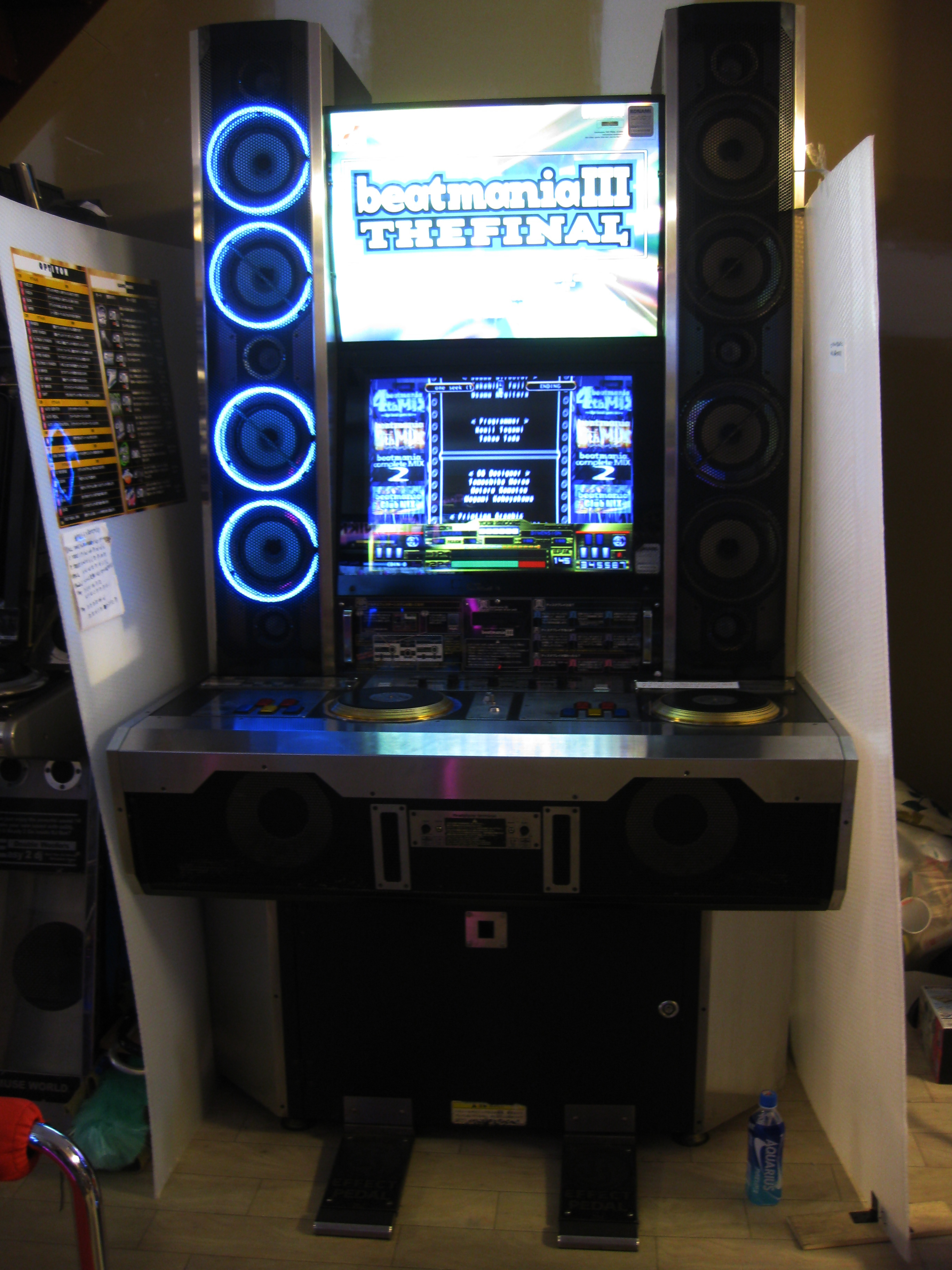
Beatmania III the Final arcade machine

Built off the Beatmania gameplay, Beatmania III added a foot pedal to the five keys and turntable used by players. The Beatmania III series was short lived with only a few releases and a series run of only two years, ending in 2002. Many songs from Beatmania III were ported to the IIDX series as well as other Bemani games.

=== BeatStream ===
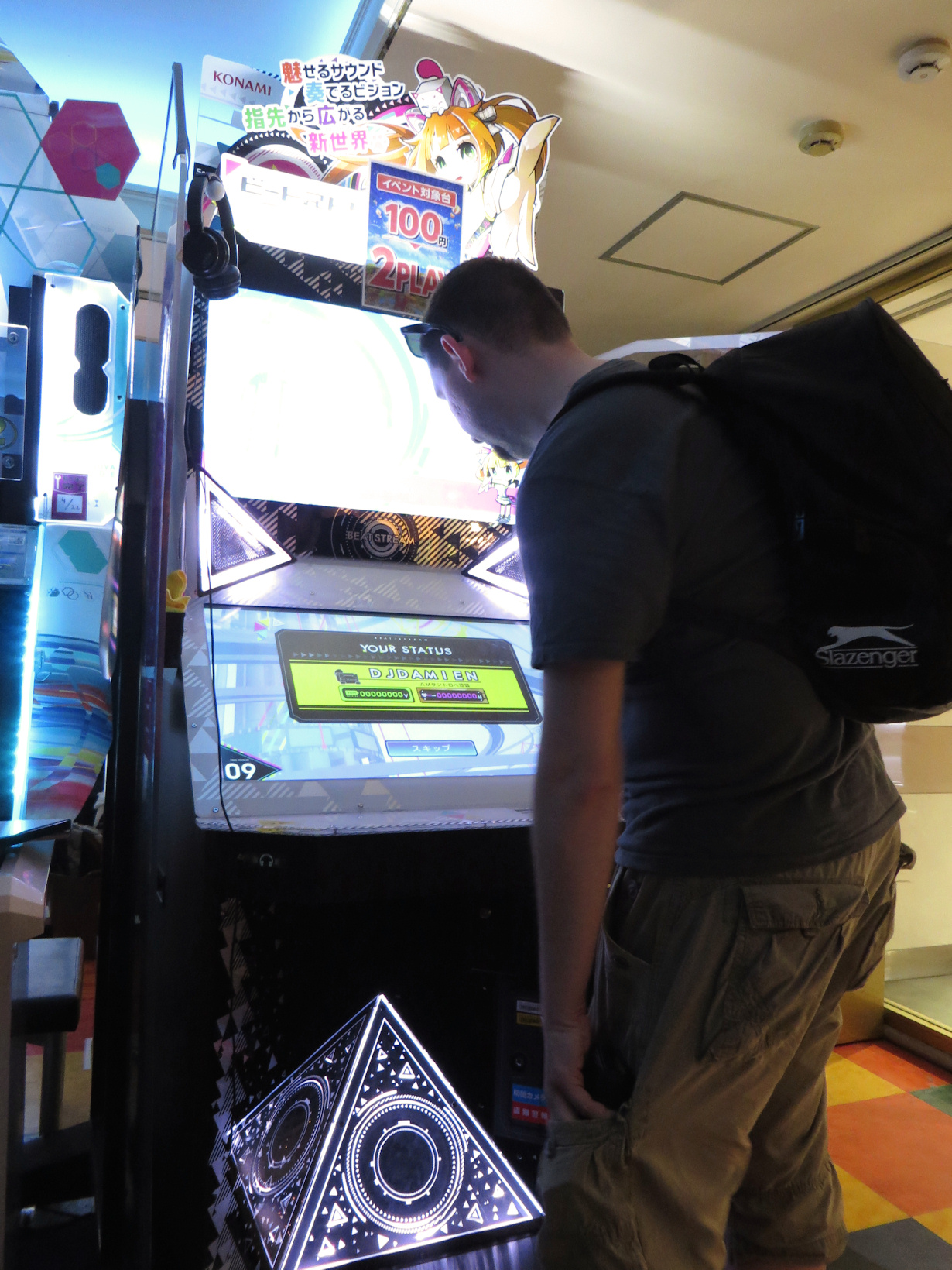
A BeatStream machine

Released on July 17, 2014, and discontinued on March 1, 2017, its gameplay involves hitting notes that come from eight directions to an octagonal judgment lines within a wide touch panel. The notes have several types: some need to be held down, and some need to be slid. Similar to Beatmania IIDX, the player starts with 30% clear gauge (represented by a ring in the middle of the screen) and have to obtain at least 70% by the end of the game to pass the stage. The music library features a good number of songs from Vocaloid and Touhou Project, like Sound Voltex, but BeatStream does have its fair share of original songs. e-Amusement support for BeatStream ended on September 1, 2017, discontinuing most cabinets that require constant e-Amusement connection, rendering the game unable to run after boot and recycling cabinets for other games. There were only two versions of the game released: 1st and AnimTribe (アニムトライヴ, Animutoraivu).

=== Bemani Pocket ===
Similar in style to Tamagotchi handhelds, the Bemani Pocket series released small, handheld versions of Dance Dance Revolution, Beatmania, and ParaParaParadise intended to be played with one's fingers. Rarer Pop'n Music and GuitarFreaks variants were produced later on.

=== Dance Dance Revolution Solo ===
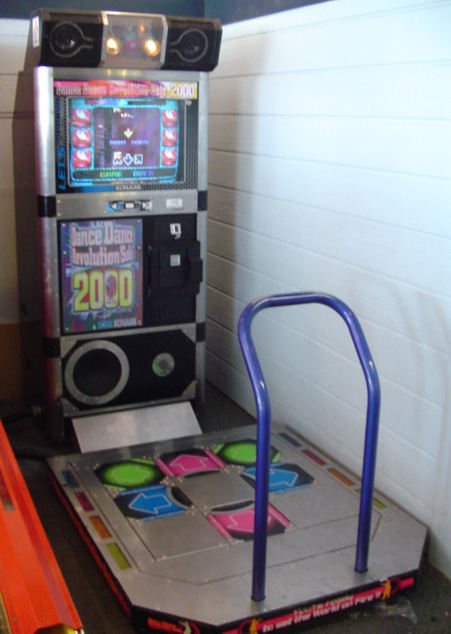
Dance Dance Revolution Solo 2000 machine

An offshoot of the Dance Dance Revolution series, Dance Dance Revolution Solo added two additional arrows to the dance stage, but supported only single-player gameplay. The Solo series saw two major releases and two complementary releases before being canceled in 2001. Most of the music exclusive to Dance Dance Revolution Solo was reused in the main Dance Dance Revolution series.

=== Dance Maniax ===
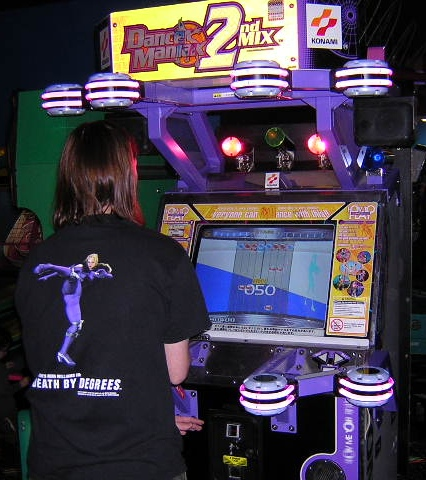
A Dance Maniax 2nd Mix arcade cabinet

Dance Maniax is an arcade video game controlled by two pairs of infrared motion sensors that detect movement of arms and legs. Several versions have been produced in 2000 and 2001. Instead of the usual concept of dropping notes in the genre (like Beatmania), they scroll up to the top of the screen instead. They can be judged as a "hit" or "miss", depending on the timing accuracy. The game featured a song list from Konami's in-house artists and Dancemania music label. There were only three versions of the game released in Japan: 1st, 2ndMIX, and 2ndMIX append JPARADISE. Its Korean version was also released, titled Dance Freaks.

=== Dance Masters and Dance Evolution ===
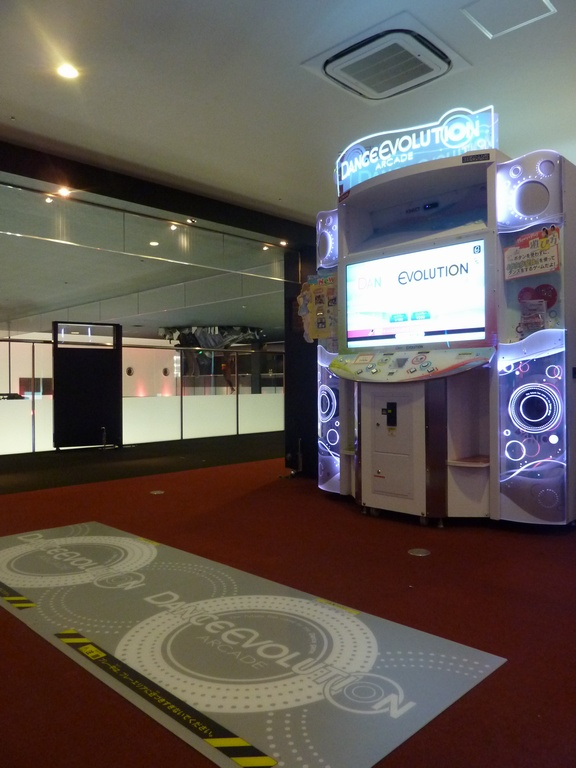
Dance Evolution Arcade

A Kinect-based game called Dance Evolution Arcade is also considered a part of Bemani series, previously being exclusive to Xbox 360. It was released on March 27, 2012. Its gameplay is similar to the original game, in which players must follow the in-game character's movements by touching and drawing line on the air correspondingly with the movement. The game ceased receiving e-Amusement service on August 31, 2016, discontinuing most cabinets that require constant e-Amusement connection, installing the offline patch and effectively terminating support for the game.

=== Keyboardmania ===
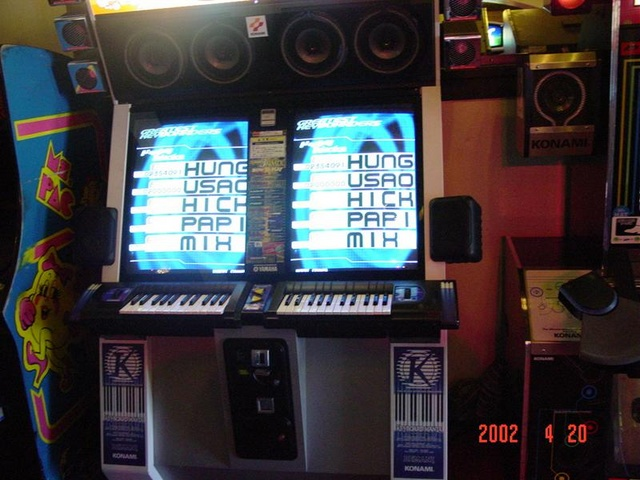
A Keyboardmania arcade cabinet

A MIDI synthesizer game. Keyboardmania features a mini-musical keyboard and players create the primarily piano based music by striking the keys to the note patterns on the screen. Keyboardmania saw only three major releases before being canceled but features exceptionally difficult and unique gameplay for the Bemani series of games. "Real Mode" actually requires players to know how to play the piano in order to easily pass the songs.

Keyboardmania can be multi-session linked with certain versions of the GuitarFreaks and DrumMania series.

=== Mambo a Go Go ===
Released exclusively in Japan in 2001, Mambo a Go Go primarily features Latin music. Players must beat three conga drums divided into three sections each. Despite its obscurity, multiple songs from Mambo a Go Go found their way into other BEMANI games. In particular, the game's title theme "One Minutes Kitchen Battle" was remixed in the Pop'n Music series as "100 Seconds Kitchen Battle".

=== Martial Beat ===
Martial Beat was designed for the PlayStation in Japan in 2001. It is based on the players' actions by use of wristband sensors. The game was shipped in a modified Dance Dance Revolution cabinet, with the sensors and the game's art on it. Although there are two sets of selection buttons (as Dance Dance Revolution supported two players), the game is one player only. To play the game, one needs to follow the on-screen instructor, and when a red light turns on located on top of the screen, the player must perform the move by repeating the instructor.

=== Mirai Dagakki FutureTomTom ===
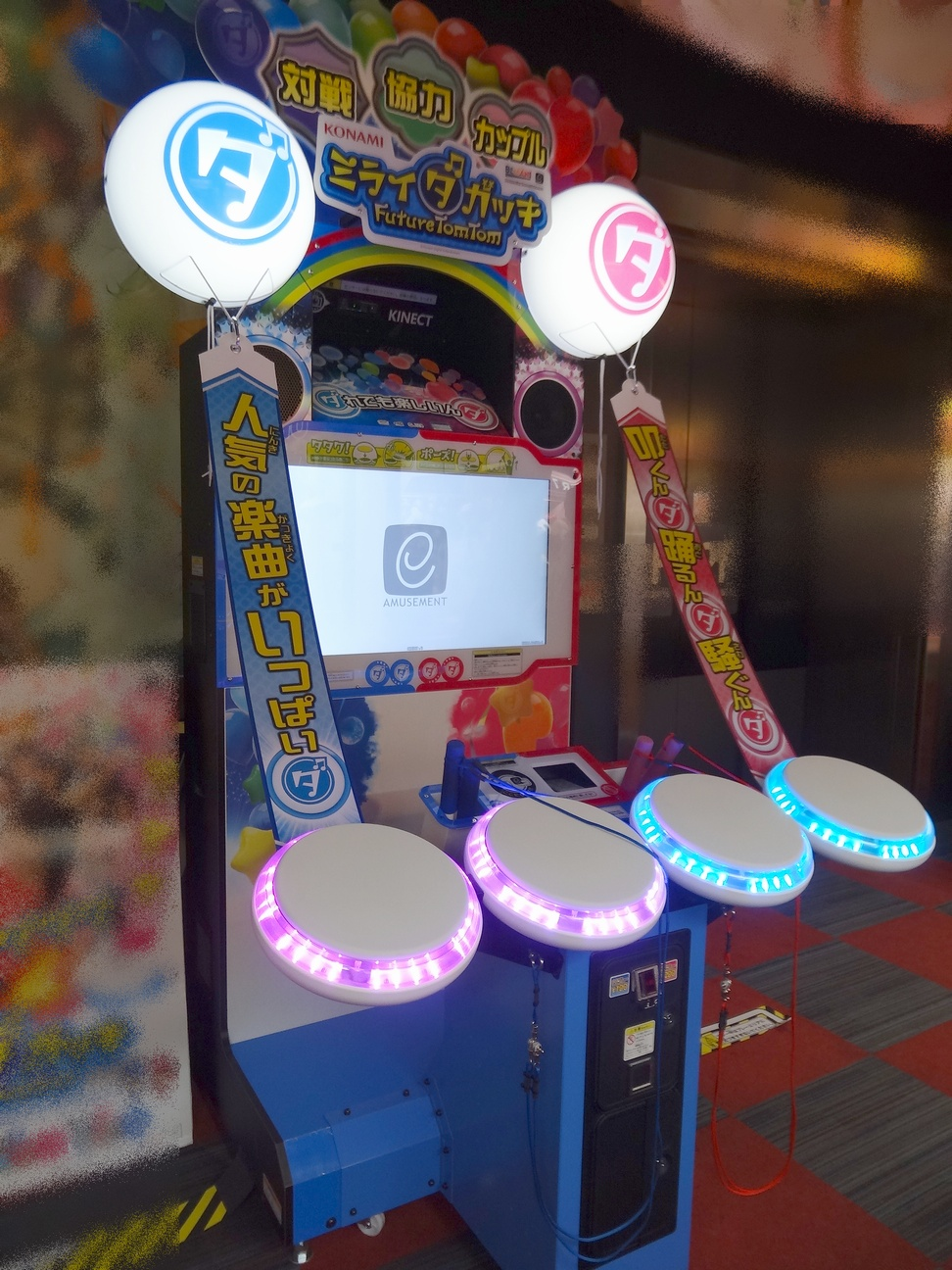
A FutureTomTom arcade cabinet

Mirai Dagakki (ミライダガッキ) FutureTomTom was first released on June 20, 2013. Its gameplay involves hitting drums to match the notes on the screen, akin to Taiko no Tatsujin. The game ceased receiving e-Amusement service on July 31, 2015, discontinuing most cabinets that require constant e-Amusement connection, installing the offline patch and effectively terminating support for the game. There were only two versions of the game released: 1st and Ver.2.

=== MÚSECA ===
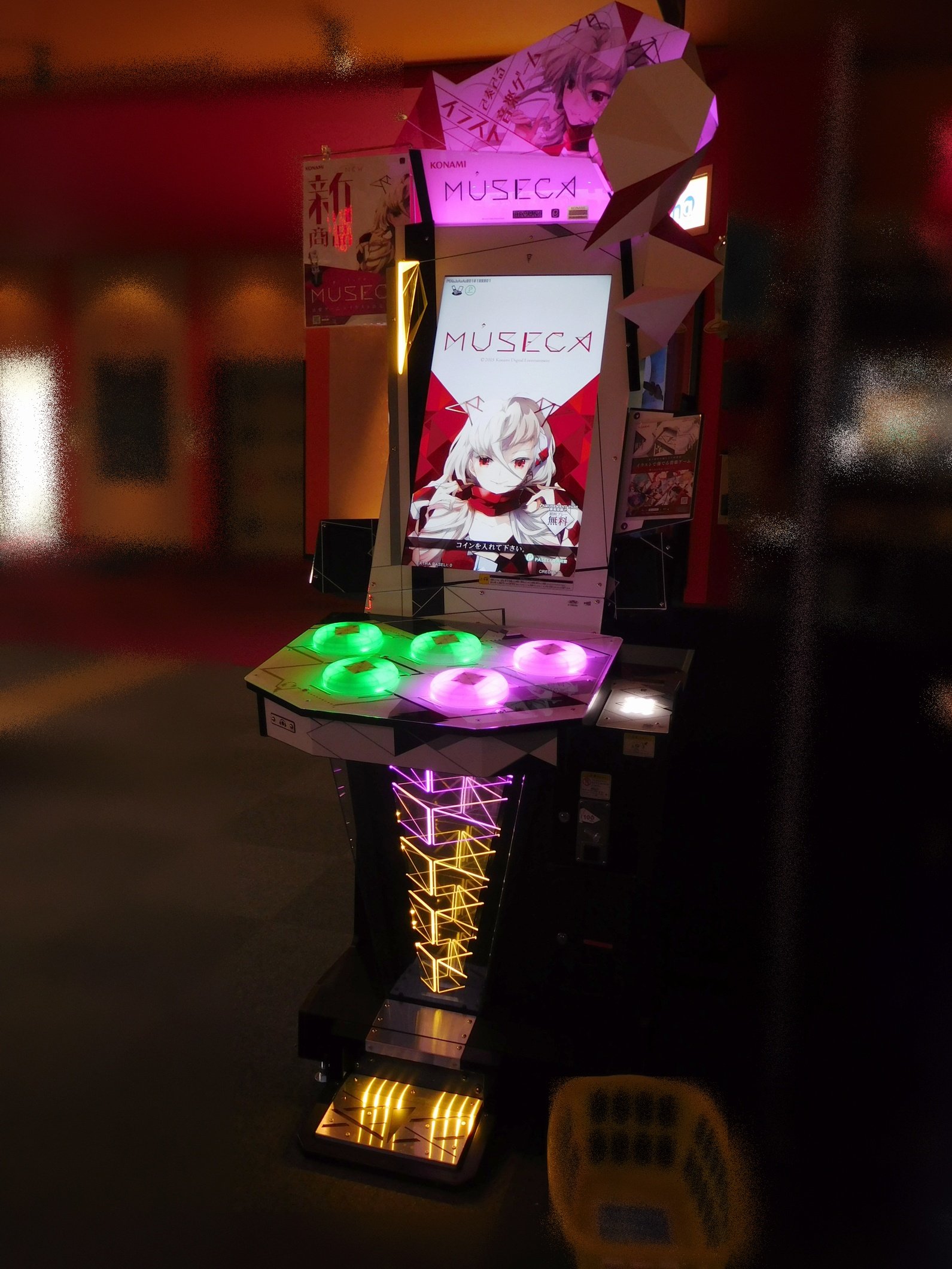
MÚSECA arcade cabinet

First released on December 10, 2015, after five location tests, MÚSECA's gameplay involves a pedal and five spinners which can be pressed, held or rotated, depending on the note type. One of MÚSECA's most important aspects are the illustrations named Grafica. A Grafica gives the player GIFTs, which are in-game bonuses that are auto-triggered at some points of the charts, slightly modifying the chart lane's judgment line. GIFTs include Life Support, Score Gain, Play Risk, and Item Collect. Most Grafica characters have their own voices that play when they're triggered in-game. The game ceased receiving e-Amusement service on July 31, 2018, discontinuing most cabinets that require constant e-Amusement connection, installing the offline patch, recycling some cabinets for other games and effectively terminating support for the game. There were only two versions of the game released: 1st and 1+1/2.

=== Para Para Paradise ===
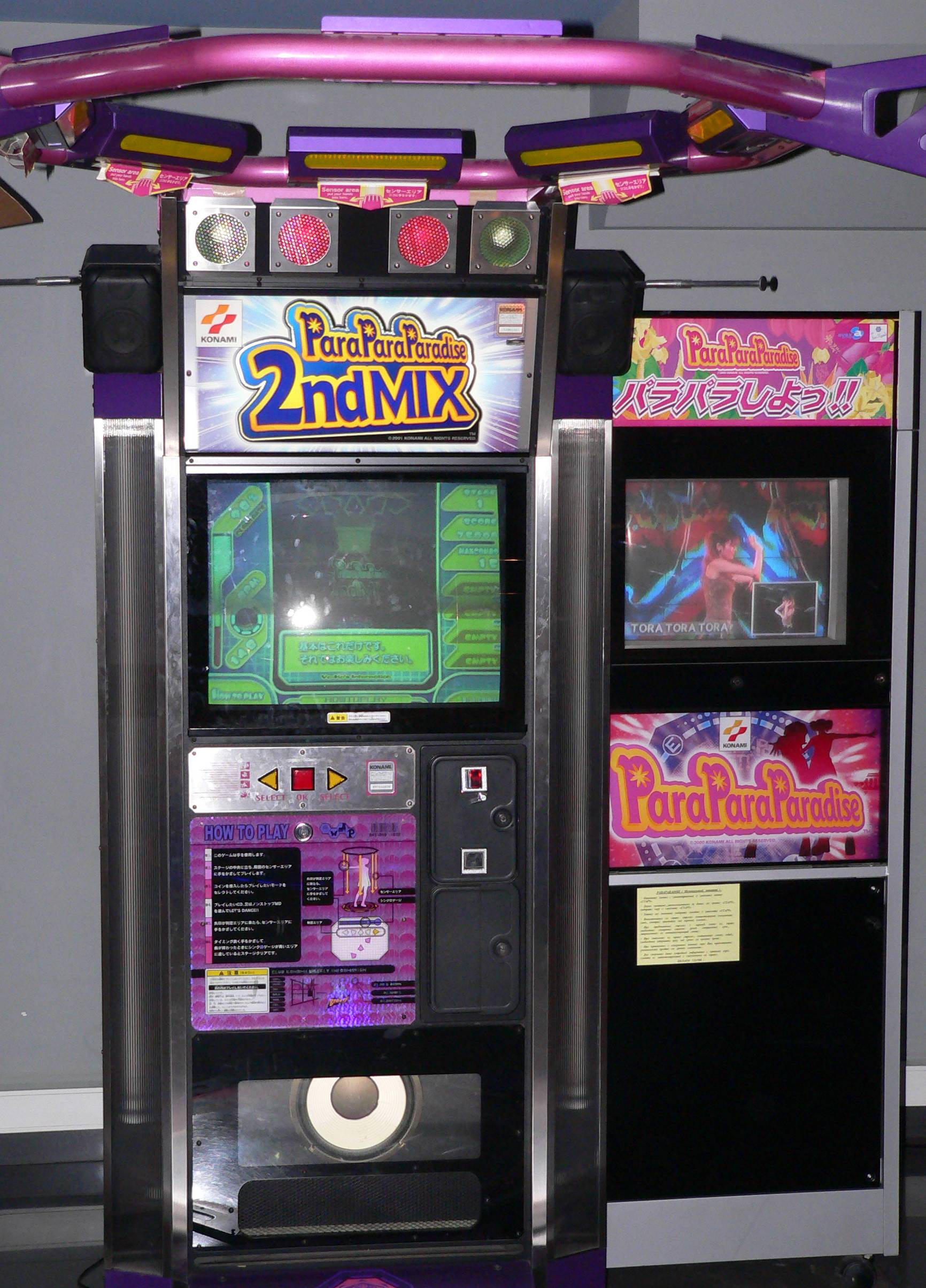
A Para Para Paradise 2nd MIX arcade cabinet

Built around the Para Para dance style made popular in Japan, Para Para Paradise recreates official dance moves within the game by setting off arrows on screen by using players' hands under a set of motion sensors. The music in the game centers around Eurobeat and features songs from Konami and Avex Trax. Only four versions of the game were released (1st, V1.1, 1st MIX Plus, and 2nd MIX) in Japan and only one version was released in South Korea (titled Para Para Dancing), as Para Para dancing fell out of mainstream popularity in Japan, and the series never saw light outside of the country beyond music game importers and localized Korean versions of the arcade machines.

=== Pop'n Stage ===
Combining game elements from Dance Dance Revolution and Pop'n Music, Pop'n Stage takes the colorful buttons and lets players play the game on a stage with their feet. There were only two versions of the game released: 1st and ex.

=== Reflec Beat ===
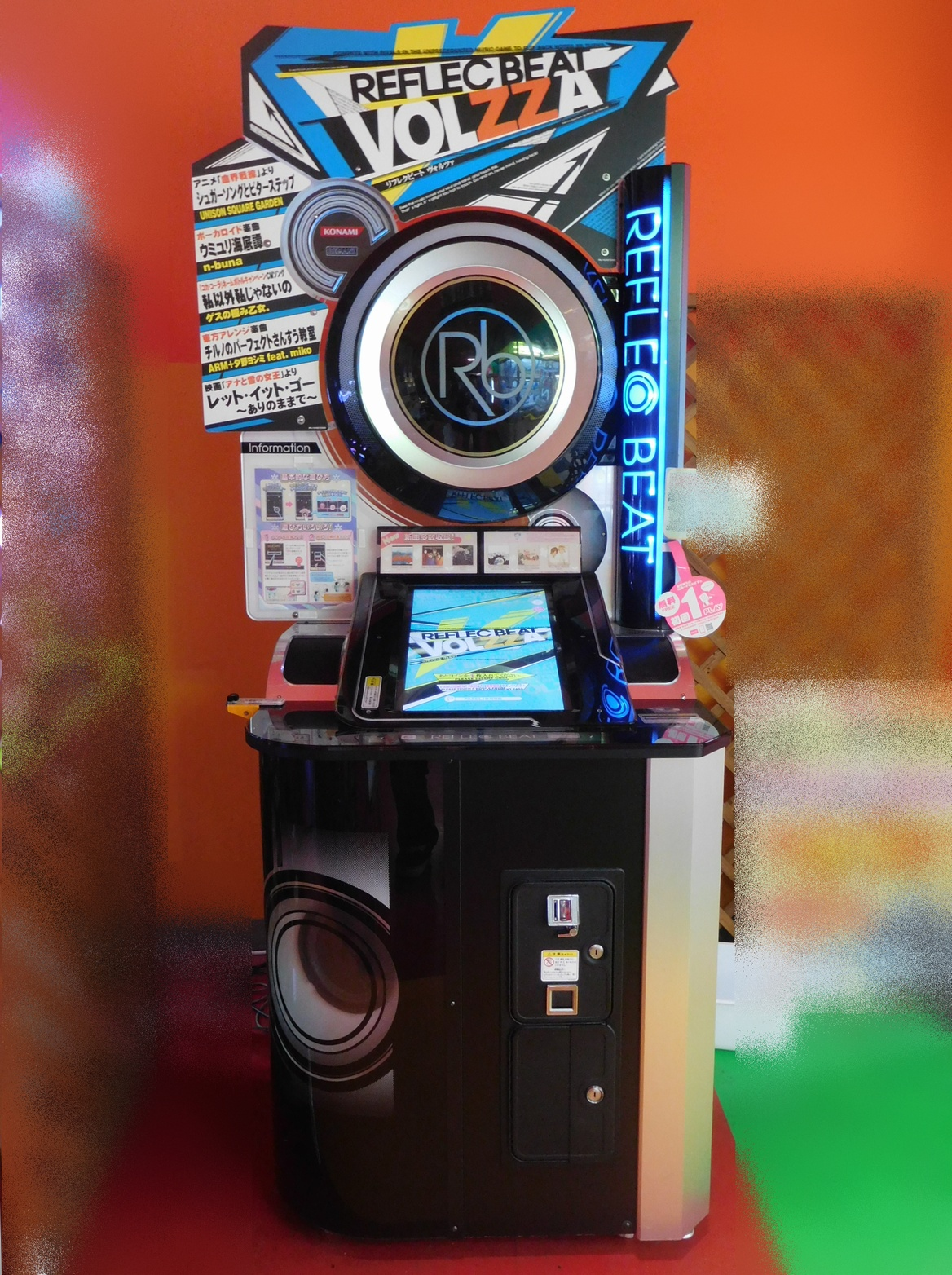
A Reflec Beat VOLZZA arcade cabinet

Reflec Beat was first released on November 4, 2010. Its gameplay is similar to air hockey, but Reflec Beat uses fingers. Players must touch circular symbols that match the color of their line moving to the player at the right time. It features a one-on-one matching system. Mobile adaptations for iOS were made in 2011, with Japan receiving Reflec Beat Plus and international regions receiving a localized version called Reflec Beat + in 2012. Like Jukebeat, Reflec Beat + contains a more restricted song list, with no licensed tracks at all.

=== Toy's March ===
Toy's March was first released on February 24, 2005. It is a simplified, kid-friendly version of DrumMania. Players act as toy soldiers in a military band. It features two player stations, each equipped with one drum pad and one cymbal pad. There were only two versions of the game released: 1st and 2.

== Bemani artists ==
In addition to licensed music tracks, Konami employs a list of in-house artists to produce the music for its Bemani series, which in 2017 started being referred to as the "BEMANI Sound Team". These artists often go by pseudonyms when credited with their songs. Some of these artists, such as TAG, have broken off to become independent artists.

== Related Konami games ==
Not all Konami-produced games involving music or rhythm bear the Bemani name.

=== Polaris Chord ===
Polaris Chord (ポラリスコード, Porarisu Kōdo) is an arcade rhythm game whose controller is made up of a slider consisting of a row of 12 shallow-pitch buttons, and a pair of levers that can be pushed to either side. It is themed after livestreaming, and focuses heavily on VTuber original songs, VTuber covers, Vocaloid, and other online hits. Some prominent VTubers whose songs are featured in the game are Houshou Marine, Tsunomaki Watame, Gawr Gura, and Calliope Mori.
