= Mosh Pit On Disney =

Compilation album by Various Artists
- Released: August 2, 2004
- Genre: Punk rock; ska
- Label: Avex Group; Walt Disney Records

Various Artists chronology
Dive into Disney (2002)	Mosh Pit On Disney (2004)

Mosh Pit On Disney is a Japanese compilation cover album containing punk rock and ska renditions of various Disney songs, such as Mickey Mouse Club March, Main Street Electrical Parade, and Under the Sea, performed by both Japanese and American artists.

== Track listing ==
1. Mosh Pit Steamroller, You Are!!! — Disney
2. Mickey Mouse Club March — Andrew W.K.
3. A Whole New World — Low IQ 01
4. Colors Of The Wind — Acidman
5. Give A Little Whistle — The Band Apart
6. You Can Fly! You Can Fly! You Can Fly! — Wrench
7. Hi-Diddle-Dee-Dee — Monteroza 4950
8. Winnie The Pooh — Asparagus
9. It's Not Easy — Reel Big Fish
10. Age Of Not Believing — The Miceteeth
11. Can't Help Falling In Love — Oi-Skall Mates
12. Heigh-Ho — The Vandals
13. Main Street Electrical Parade — Kenzi Masabuchi
14. When You Wish Upon A Star — American Hi-Fi
15. Give A Little Whistle — Toru Hidaka (Beat Crusaders)
16. I'll Try — TGMX
17. Under The Sea — Doping Panda
18. Ev'rybody Wants To Be A Cat — Brian Setzer
19. Heartbreak Hotel — Sexer
20. I Wanna Be Like You — Smash Mouth
21. Good Company — Cubismo Grafico Five
22. Under The Sea — Your Song Is Good
23. Some Day My Prince Will Come — Full Swing
24. Part Of Your World — The Suemith
