= Cristiana Cucchi =

Italian singer

Bazooka Girl (real name: Cristiana Cucchi) is a Eurobeat vocalist and one of the most well-known names on "HI-NRG Attack", an Italian record label.

Cristiana has worked under many different aliases, and before joining HI-NRG Attack, she worked under the name, "Chris", an alias that she still apparently uses at the HI-NRG Attack record company.

== Songs ==
- Bazooka Girl - Bazooka Girl
- Bazooka Girl - Campus Summit
- Bazooka Girl - Cantare Ballare (Happy Eurobeat)
- Bazooka Girl - Flying Around The World
- Bazooka Girl - Mister Robinson
- Bazooka Girl - Velfarre 2000
- Franz "V.I.P." Tornado & Bazooka "T.C.V." Girl - Super Euro Flash
- Franz Tornado & Bazooka Girl - Caballero With Sombrero
- Bazooka Girl - Nel Blu Dipinto Di Blu
- Bazooka Girl - Hey Hey Velfarre (unreleased)
- Bazooka Girl - The Class Of Velfarre
- Bazooka Girl - Everybody Velfarre
- Bazooka Girl - Money Funny Dollars
- Franz Tornado & Bazooka Girl - Motto-Motto Inamoto
- Chris - First Time (12 remix)
- Chris - First Time (last version)
- Chris - Hey Dee Jay (Dee Jay Pazzo Mix)
- )
- Chris - Not For Money
- Chris - Power Of My Love
- Chris - Take Me To The Top (ultimate mix)
- Chris - Viva L'Amour
- Chris - Two by Two
- Chriss- With A Boy Like You
- Chriss - Sweets For My Sweet
- Chriss - Lucky Boy
- Princess F. - Infidelity
- Princess F. - Technotronic Flight
- Princess F. - Shadows in the Night
- Leslie Hammond - Friends in the Name of Love
- Leslie Hammond - Feel My Body and Soul
- HRG Unlimited - Come On in Tokyo
- HRG Unlimited - The Story of Max and Kaori
- HRG Unlimited - Greatest Lover
- Betty Blue - We Can Make it Stronger
- Betty Blue - Go Go Baby
- Betty Blue - Good Time
- Betty Blue - Changes
- Valery Scott - No More Tears
- Live Music Gang - This is Para Para
- Cindy - Gucci Girl
- Cindy - Jammin' Spanish Men
- Lou Lou Marina - Latin Lover
