= Para Para =

Synchronized dance that originated in Japan

Para Para (パラパラ, ParaPara) or Para-Para is a synchronized dance that originated in Japan. Unlike most types of club and rave dancing, Para Para features specific synchronized movements for each song, much like line dancing. Para Para has been around since the early 1980s, when European countries started selling Italo disco and Eurodisco and, in the mid-to late 1970s, new wave and synthpop music in Japan. However, the dance did not achieve much popularity outside Japan until the late 1990s.

Para Para is strongly associated with Eurobeat. Eurobeat artist Dave Rodgers has described Para Para as the only way to dance to Eurobeat, which is usually "so fast."

Two dancers in 2009

== Description ==
Para Para dancing consists of mostly upper body movements in synchronization with a four-on-the-floor rhythm. Dancing involves choreographed motions with the arms and hands while stepping to the right and left, similar to the movements of traditional festival dances such as Bon Odori and cheering squads called Ōendan. Para Para dancing is generally done to Eurobeat and Eurodance music, with each track having its own dance routine. Para Para involves very little lower body movement, with the exception of moving one's hips, stepping in place, and jumping or hopping. Some routines feature more complex leg movements. Routines are generally choreographed by groups affiliated with popular clubs in Japan (see below).

Fans of Para Para often refer to themselves as "paralists" and include official and unofficial teams of dancers in Japan, Chile, Brazil, Spain, the United States, Canada, Taiwan, Hong Kong, Finland, and several other countries. Some such dance teams are recognized by major Japanese music labels such as Avex and have been featured in Japanese media like the magazine Egg.

The history of Para Para is largely described by the community and historians in terms of "booms", during which Para Para saw an increase in popularity. Times of decreased popularity are referred to as "glacial" periods. To date, there have been four distinct booms, each with a distinct cultural and historical context.

=== "Official" vs. "maniac" ===
The term "official" in the parapara world describes routines made by certain clubs/choreography groups in Japan. A non-exhaustive list of official club events are Starfire, SEF, 9LoveJ, and Twinstar. These routines are danced and learned by most people in the community.

In response to official routines, people in Japan have made their own routines, called "maniac" routines. This movement started in the late 1990s with clubs like Hibiya Radio City and Tottori Eleven choreographing their own routines. In addition to the club events mentioned, other famous maniac club events that existed were Medusa, Area, Joy, AXOS, Bless, and TMD. As of 2008, club events in Japan have not choreographed many maniac routines, and the movement has basically stopped. However, some official club events like Starfire and SEF still continue. Some paralists prefer maniac to official routines, though, and continue to host small events like Ravenous that feature maniac routines.

=== Variants ===
Some variants of Para Para include TechPara (set to hyper techno instead of Eurobeat), and TraPara or ToraPara (set to trance).

=== OriPara and refilms ===
In what is called OriPara (for "original Para Para"), some may make their own parapara routines to their favorite Eurobeat songs. The term OriPara is typically reserved for routines that are not made by famous choreographers or taught at club events.

A refilm is a home-made, usually non-profit video in which dancers film themselves dancing parapara routines. The routines usually come from commercial or club videos, but some have been known to film their own routines, which is a phenomenon called "oripara." These videos have not played a big part in the Japanese parapara community, possibly for copyright reasons, but they are very big part of the international parapara community since there are no large parapara events outside Japan. The two general purposes of a refilm are to highlight a rare routine or to show the public ones' skills. With the advent of YouTube, refilms have become more visible internationally to even non-paralists.

== Etymology ==
It is thought that the term "Para Para" is derived from the onomatopoeic expression of one's hand movements along with the music, where the beat of the music was described similarly to "Pa-pa pa-pa-ra ra-ra", similar to phrases such as "boop-boop-bee-doop" in English.

== Origin ==
There are several theories about the origin of Para Para. One theory is that it started in the early 1980s when men working in VIP rooms in clubs would choreograph dances to impress female clientele, while another is that it developed from the Takenoko-zoku subculture that would gather in the pedestrian plaza of Yoyogi Park in Harajuku to dance choreographed routines to popular music and disco.

== History ==
=== 1st boom (1987–1992) ===
ParaPara is thought to have started in the late 1980s at high-class discos during Japan's bubble era. Men dressed in black suits would teach routines at clubs such as Aoyama King & Queen and Maharaja Azabu-Jūban. It is difficult to learn some of the dances due to the fact that no recordings exist of the routines. It is also largely unknown which clubs made specific routines during this era because of this.

==== Wangan ====
The term wangan (湾岸, "bay coast") mainly describes the particular choreography from clubs around Tokyo Bay circa 1993, including Eden Roc and the aforementioned Maharaja Azabu-jūban. Like with the 1st boom, such choreography is difficult to find, albeit slightly easier due to the availability of recording devices at the time. Routines of songs from the latter half of the Eurobeat Fantasy, That's Eurobeat, Super Eurobeat volumes 1 through 49, and Maharaja Night Hi-NRG Revolution volumes 1 through 9 music series are usually categorized as wangan. Some wangan Para Para videos include the Venus Cafe's Wangan-Ou (湾岸王, "Wangan King") Special and Kyoto Gingerman One Gun. Unfortunately, many wangan dancers have since retired from the Para Para scene, and there are currently very few club events in Japan that play wangan songs.

=== 2nd boom (1993–1995) ===
Many Para Para routines originate from this era. Clubs like Xenon, Twinstar, King & Queen, and Maharaja were very popular during this period. It was also during this period when Avex Trax, the music label in Japan behind the Super Eurobeat compilation series, released one of the first officially licensed Para Para videos to clubs on March 21, 1994, entitled ParaPara Kyōten 0 (パラパラ教典 0, "Para Para Scripture 0"). The video features 40 songs from the 2nd Boom era, and most of the featured routines are still used today. The beginning of this boom can be marked by the release of Super Eurobeat volume 40, and it lasted until as late as Super Eurobeat volume 80. During the latter half of this boom, some clubs created "unofficial" or "maniac" routines, which were featured in Hibiya Radio City, Yokohama Maharaja, and Tottori Eleven.

=== 3rd boom (1999–2001) ===
The cause of this boom has largely been credited to the appearance of Takuya Kimura on television program SMAP×SMAP, dancing to Niko's "Night of Fire" and Domino's "Mickey Mouse March (Eurobeat Version)". During this period, with Xenon having closed its doors, Twinstar continued to make routines. 9LoveJ and Velfarre started making their own routines. The popularity of this period early on was amplified by gyaru culture as well. In commercial videos, Avex and competitors like Victor and Digibeat began releasing regular commercial Para Para videos that featured routines for songs from their respective Eurobeat CDs. Some of these series include Para Para Paradise, Para Para Panic!, and Euroパラパラ How. ParaPara Paradise was the most popular series in sales, and featured an idol group called ParaPara Allstars (PPA). The group originally consisted of Richie, Maki, Miho, Satoko, Tomomi, and Ryoko. At the time, Richie had been in many Twinstar videos and Satoko was featured in many 9LoveJ videos. During this period, "maniac" dances also were choreographed. Some of the more popular clubs featuring "maniac" events were Medusa and Joy.

=== 4th boom (2005–2010) ===
There was a noticeable change in the Para Para scene in 2005, when Avex became aggressive in selling Para Para DVDs like Gazen ParaPara!! and We Love TechPara in 2005, which began in this boom. The height of the 4th boom could be considered to have occurred in 2007 when Farm Records released Para Para DVDs, or circa 2009 when "Ani-Para" reached its peak of popularity. Circa 2008, many Para Para routines were being choreographed to eurobeat remixes of anime songs, mainly by 9LoveJ.

When the Ani-Para boom ended in 2010, Avex stopped releasing videos, and 9LoveJ removed Para Para from their schedule altogether. As of 2014, there had been no major commercially released ParaPara videos since. As for "maniac" events, Joy and TMD choreographed until around 2008, when they stopped altogether.

=== 4th boom glacial period (2010–) ===
With Avex Trax halting all commercial ParaPara videos, the associated marketing dwindled as well, resulting in a noticeable decline in newer paralists. This decline has deeply affected the Para Para scene and has in turn resulted in a decline of club event attendance. As a response to the attendance decline, many events such as StarFire, Ravenous, and others have moved to smaller venues to save costs rather than stopping outright.

The Internet has also changed the ParaPara scene, with many lessons (including those posted by clubs) being found on platforms like YouTube. In addition, the only official club events that are active are SEF and Starfire. 9LoveJ stopped playing Eurobeat and hyper techno around the end of 2010.

== Choreographer groups ==
There are a few choreographer groups that have stood out in the history of ParaPara.

Shishō Gundan (師匠軍団) is a long-running group of choreographers that has had many members. It is unclear when the group first began, but it is assumed to be in the early 1990s. The team had the most impact in Twinstar, where they choreographed most of the club's Para Para routines. There were many members in the 1990s, but the most famous members were Gori-shishō (ゴリ師匠) (real name Keita Fukaya), Arai-shishō (新井師匠) (real name Takashi Arai), Morita-shishō (堀田師匠) (real name Taisuke Hotta), Haru-shishō (ハル師匠) (real name Haruki Takahashi,) and Yan-shishō (ヤン師匠) (real name unknown). All five of these members have appeared in Twinstar videos at least once. As of 2011, however, the only members of Shishou Gundan (師匠軍団) are Banchō (番長) (real name Yoshihiro Yamada), Ryōhei (りょうへい) (real name Ryohei Yamaoka), and Inocchi (いのっち) (real name Katsuyoshi Inomata), who are all currently choreographers of StarFire.

T-RREX is also a long-running official choreographer group. The initials stand for Twinstar, Rie, Richie, and Xenon, which refers to who started T-RREX. The most famous and long-running members are Ryōhei, Inocchi, and Shintaro (しんたろう). They mainly choreograph for StarFire following Twinstar's closure in 2003. Shintaro ceased activity in the community in 2010, and it is unclear if he is still in T-RREX.

Team SEF is another long-running official choreographer group. They strictly choreograph for the club event SEF. The name "Team SEF" wasn't popular until the SEF Gold Club videos were first released around 2004. The members around that time were Ichi, Omami, Rena, Yano, Shingo, Kahori, and possibly Satoko. After Velfarre closed in 2006, almost all of the members were replaced when the event changed names to SEF Deluxe. The members as of 2015 are Manami, Rumine, Kaihei, Kei, Mai, Shiori and Sakiko.

== Club events ==
In any given week, there are multiple Para Para events in Japan. A typical Para Para club event begins the first 30 minutes by playing Italo disco or other such genres besides Eurobeat. Usually there are not many people during the first 30 minutes, so Eurobeat is reserved for periods of higher activity. After the first 20 or 30 minutes, depending on the number of people in the club, more danceable music is played.

Depending on the event, the first danceable songs played are different. For example, if one was at an event where the DJs played only Eurobeat songs from the 1990s, then the first songs would be from 1990 to 1991. If one were at a more official or modern event like SEF or StarFire, the songs would probably start around 1998–1999, when the 3rd ParaPara boom began. In most events, the songs have some sort of progression by year released, continuing until the end of the club event. The eras chosen vary by venue; some events may start playing songs from 2006, for example. There are some events that play techno as well as Eurobeat. In these events, there are rarely people who dance both Para Para and TechPara. Most people opt out of one segment or the other, depending on what routines they are familiar with.

At most club events, there is a lesson where new Para Para routines are taught. This is a very important part of a club event, because lessons serve to continue Para Para routines. A lesson is usually taught in 15 or 20 minutes. During a lesson, the new routine is danced first with music. After that, with spoken instructions and assistance, the dancer slowly dances each part of the routine to help attendees learn it without music. After this is done, the routine is danced for a final time with music. After the lesson, there are two or three more sets of songs played until the event ends.

== Club videos ==
Club videos are an important part of Para Para, but their importance has changed over the years. The first-known Para Para club video to be released was Avex's ParaPara Kyōten 0 on VHS. After that, many club videos were released as people were not able to film lessons by themselves in the 1990s. They became highly desirable commodities to some, as lessons were almost impossible to find before 2004–2005.

These videos are no longer sold commercially and are generally only distributed at only one event, which makes them extremely rare and essentially impossible for foreigners to see. Because of these reasons, random people began to sell club videos, mainly DVD copies, online on auction websites like Yahoo! Auctions Japan and Mobaku.jp. A full series of SEF Gold videos, for example, would usually sell for about 5,000 yen, while a much longer series like Xenon would sell for 9,000 yen or more.

In 2010, with the decline of Para Para, online sales of physical copies basically ceased. However, a project that began on March 9, 2013, on YouTube called Para Para Open Source Project has attempted to solve the problem of the rarity of club videos by uploading them to the public. Club videos released since 2009 have become less and less important, as some people have begun to upload lessons mainly to video-sharing websites like YouTube. Because of this, club events like StarFire have at least one routine on a club video that has never been taught as a lesson. In the 2010s, physical copies of club videos are not released as much anymore, with new DVDs only being distributed by StarFire and SEF every 5–6 months. This is a stark difference from the 2nd boom, when there were over 100 club videos released across Japan in the span of two years.

== List of notable clubs ==
- Twin Star (1994–2003) Kagurazaka, Shinjuku, Tokyo
- Velfarre (1994–2006) Roppongi, Tokyo
- Maharaja Roppongi (2010–present) Roppongi, Tokyo
- Maharaja Azabu-Jūban (Main Office) (1984–1997) Azabu-Jūban, Tokyo
- Yokohama Maharaja (1986–1998) Yokohama
- Shinjuku Club Complex Code (????-c. 2008) Shinjuku, Tokyo

== List of notable official club events ==
- Hyper Star Energy (1993–2003) at Twin Star in Kagurazaka, Shinjuku, Tokyo
- Xenon (c. 1994–1997) at Xenon in Shinjuku, Tokyo
- Area (1995–1998) at Area in Roppongi, Tokyo
- 9LoveJ (1998–2010?) mostly in Shibuya; also in Grace Bali in Shinjuku, Tokyo from circa 2007–2010
- Super Euro Flash [SEF] (1998–2000) at Velfarre in Roppongi, Tokyo
- SEF Mach!! (2001–2004) at Velfarre
- SEF Gold (2004–2006) at Velfarre
- SEF DX (SEF Deluxe) (2007–present) at Xross in Tokyo; presently at Maharaja Roppongi
- Starfire (2004–present) at Area until 2005, 2009–2014 at Pasela in Ginza, Tokyo; 2014–?? at Grace Bali in Shinjuku, Tokyo; Pasela from 2016–present
- B-1 Dynamite!! (late 2005–present) presently at Shinjuku Gatsby House, hosted by Starfire

== List of notable maniac club events ==
- Medusa (2000–2002), considered to be the most "official" of maniac choreography groups
- Joy (c. 1998–2008) in Ibaraki Prefecture
- TMD (2000–2008), an event marketed towards gay people which featured drag queens as guests. TMD also has the largest volume of Para Para videos ever released (over 60).

== In popular culture ==
- After Takuya Kimura of SMAP performed a Para Para routine on television (see above), it had such a large impact that even Mickey Mouse danced it in Tokyo Disneyland. People in Mickey Mouse and other Disney character costumes later appeared on television dancing alongside Kimura.
- In chapter 30 of the manga Bobobo-bo Bo-bobo, the character Don Patch performs a Para Para dance with a group of bipedal cats.
- The eighth opening to the anime Detective Conan, "Koi wa Thrill, Shock, Suspense" by Rina Aiuchi, features the main character, Edogawa Conan, performing a Para Para dance to the song.
- In one episode of the anime Dragon Ball GT, Goku, his granddaughter Pan, their friend Trunks, and even the robot Giru are made to do a Para Para-style dance by the three Para Para Brothers.
- Para Para dancing is featured heavily in the 2006 Japanese dorama Gal Circle. Many of the episodes revolve around it, and nearly all of the major characters belong to a group that is dedicated to it.
- In the manga Gals!, Para Para dancing is a popular pastime for the main character Kotobuki Ran.
- K-pop girl group Kara created a rendition of the Para Para dance (also known as the "KARApara") for their fourth Japanese single "Go Go Summer!".
- The Japanese video game company Konami has released a series of video games called Para Para Paradise as part of its Bemani series of music-based games. The games feature an octagonal platform with motion sensors above it. Players must trigger the sensors by moving their arms (or other body parts) under the sensors when the corresponding arrow reaches the top of the screen at the front of the platform.
- The song "Jimo-Ai Dash!" from Japanese multimedia franchise Love Live! Sunshine!! contains Para Para choreography, with the song itself being in a Eurobeat style.
- Para Para Sakura, a film starring Aaron Kwok, features a Para Para dance. The theme song for the film, "Para Para Sakura", however, is not related to any form of Para Para-based music.
- In the video game Rumble Roses XX, one of the penalty games of Queen's Match is Para Para dancing. The girl who loses is forced to perform the dance and, depending on the costume the player chose, the girl may have a positive, neutral, or negative reaction.

== Outside Japan ==
The United Kingdom, United States, Canada, Finland, France, Taiwan, Spain, Chile, Scandinavia, Brazil, Argentina and other countries outside Japan have an active fanbase doing refilms on the Internet. These dancers have circles and groups that host panels at anime conventions, where they teach Para Para routines.

The only western Para Para team ever to have been paid to perform Para Para in Japan is American Dream, which performed a special performance at Avex Rave 2005.

In the United States, Geneon Entertainment released the Para Para MAX US Mix series of CDs, which contain remixes of anime theme music from Neon Genesis Evangelion, Pokémon, Magic Knight Rayearth, and many other anime productions. Volumes 1, 2, and 3 were released in 2005. Geneon held contests to promote the CD and its anime series. 2005's contest was held at Otakon on August 20, 2005. Geneon's efforts failed to expand the reach of Para Para in the United States. Regardless of this, Geneon released a Para Para instructional DVD called ParaPara MAX: The Moves 101, featuring several United States paralists. The DVD did not sell well due to an exclusive sales agreement with Media Play, Sam Goody and Suncoast Motion Picture Company, which soon went out of business. After the Anime Fusion Tour's conclusion in the summer of 2006, Yoko Ishida's management changed, which led to the end of Geneon's promotion of Para Para in the United States.

Between the years of 2006 and 2007, Para Para briefly went mainstream in Germany and Austria due to the group Shanadoo, who performed Para Para dances in some of their music video clips.

Elsewhere in Asia, some editions of the Para Para Paradise series were released in Hong Kong.

== See also ==
- Eurobeat
- Italo disco
- Avex Trax
- Gazen ParaPara!!
- Para Para Paradise
