= Alessandra Mirka Gatti =

- Born: 19 November 1969 (age 56); Mantua, Italy
- Genres: Italo disco; Eurobeat
- Years active: 1985–present
- Labels: Discomagic Records; A-Beat C; SCP Music; Avex Trax

Alessandra Mirka Gatti or Alessandra Gatti born 19 November 1969 in Mantua, Italy, is an Italian Eurobeat singer who is popularly known by her stage name of Domino.

== Career ==
Alessandra Mirka Gatti first got a name in Italo disco when she met Giancarlo Pasquini in the mid-1980s. After recording various tracks as a back vocalist, she recorded her first song under her most recognized alias, Domino, in 1989. She then helped found A-Beat C with Giacarlo Pasquini and Alberto Contini, in 1990, but left in 2006 to embark on her most recent project with executive producer, Sandro Oliva, Go Go's Music (Which had its first appearance on Super Eurobeat 175, and was officially added to the label roster on Super Eurobeat 177.)

She has sung under these aliases with A-Beat C, not limited to the following:

- Domino
- Mirka
- Juliet
- Groove Twins
- King & Queen
- Salt & Pepper
- Paula Roberts
- Sheela
- Lucrezia B.
- Donna Luna
- Bella Model

Today, she sings exclusively under the alias Domino, and as a member of the Eurobeat group Go Go Girls with Elena Gobbi Frattini – for her label Go Go's Music.

Her most well-known songs are:

- "Tora Tora Tora" – Domino's most well-known song, which was produced by Bratt Sinclaire for A-Beat C in 1994.
- "Mickey Mouse March (Eurobeat Mix) – A Eurobeat cover of the famous Disney tune, which has appeared on Dance Dance Revolution and many Eurobeat and Japanese Disney albums, including Eurobeat Disney.
- "Para Girl" – A Go Go's Music production that has been very popular since its release in August 2008.

== Japan ==
Thanks to her song Mickey Mouse March (Eurobeat Version), which aired on SMAPxSMAP and was danced by Takuya Kimura, Para Para rapidly increased in popularity in Japan in 1998. Some of her songs were featured in the Konami Video game Para Para Paradise.

== Personal life ==
Gatti was married to Italo disco/Eurobeat artist Giancarlo Pasquini and has a son named Federico, who was born to him. He was raised by Gatti after their divorce, involved in music activity, and also active as a Eurobeat singer, the same as his parents, under the stage name Kaioh (Formerly known as Freddy Rodgers).

== Discography ==
=== As Domino ===
==== 1990s ====
Year	Title	Album
1989	Fever	Best Disco 7
1991	Fall in Love	Super Eurobeat 13
1991	Your Freedom	Super Eurobeat 16
1991	Hot Confession	Super Eurobeat 17
1992	Forever Young	Maharaja Night HI-NRG Revolution 01
1993	Behind You	Super Eurobeat 32
1993	Domino Dancing	Super Eurobeat 39
1994	Tora Tora Tora	Super Eurobeat 48
1995	Beat Beat Freak	Maharaja Night HI-NRG Revolution 16
1995	Baby Come Back	The Alfee Meets Dance
1995	Funky Dog!	The Alfee Meets Dance
1995	Promised Love	The Alfee Meets Dance
1995	Hot & Soul (with Aki)	Maharaja Night HI-NRG Revolution 17
1996	Talking Hands(Dave Rodgers) (with Aki)	Super Eurobeat 64
1996	Euroboy (Dave Rodgers)	Super Eurobeat 64
1996	Give Me Five	Super Eurobeat 69
1996	My Love Is Still Alive	Maharaja Night HI-NRG Revolution 19
1997	Spinning Like A Top	Super Eurobeat 79
1997	Boy Meets Girl	Super Eurobeat 80 Anniversary Non-Stop Mix Request Count Down 80!!
1998	I Wanna Dance	Super Eurobeat 88
1998	Feel My Heart	Super Eurobeat 90 Anniversary Non-Stop Request Count Down 90!!
1999	Woa Woa Woa (with Jennifer Batten)	Super Eurobeat 95
1999	Play with the Numbers	Super Eurobeat 98

==== 2000s ====
Year	Title	Album
2000	Tomodachi Big Friend	Super Eurobeat 101
2000	To Say To Do To Kiss	Super Eurobeat 106
2000	Popteen	Popteen
2000	Mickey Mouse March (Eurobeat Version)	Eurobeat Disney
2000	Macho Duck	Eurobeat Disney
2000	Beauty and The Beast	Eurobeat Disney
2000	Bibbidi-Bobbidi-Boo	Eurobeat Disney
2000	Chim Chim Cher-ee	Eurobeat Disney
2000	Zip-A-Dee-Doo-Dah	Eurobeat Disney
2000	Kill The Silence	Domino
2001	Colors of the Wind	Eurobeat Disney 2
2001	Some Day My Prince Will Come	Eurobeat Disney 2
2001	A Dream Is A Wish Your Heart Makes	Eurobeat Disney 2
2001	Mickey Motion	Eurobeat Disney 2
2001	ParaPara Paradise	Super Eurobeat 118
2001	Stop	Super Eurobeat 121
2001	Gotcha!	Super Eurobeat 122
2001	D.D.D.!	Eurobeat Disney 3
2002	1, 2, Santos	
2003	Hey Mr. Dee Jay	Super Eurobeat 138
2004	The Game of My Name	Super Eurobeat 144
2006	Fuku Wa Uchi!	Super Eurobeat 164
2007	Go Go Where You Wanna Go Go	Super Eurobeat 175
2007	Cooking Boy	Super Eurobeat 176
2008	Call Me	Super Eurobeat 190
2008	Nack 5 (with Kaioh)	Super Eurobeat 192 ~Let's Party~
2008	Para Girl	Super Eurobeat 192 ~Let's Party~
2009	Super Eurobeat (with Virginelle & Mega NRG Man)	Super Eurobeat 199 ~Collaboration of Eurobeat~

==== 2010s ====
Year	Title	Album
2010	One-O-Nine	Super Eurobeat 203
2011	Boom Boom Scream (with Scream Team)	Super Eurobeat 214
2013	Bad Girl	Super Eurobeat 226
2015	Hai Hai	Super Eurobeat 233
2017	King of the Road (with Kaioh)	Super Eurobeat 244
2019	Domination	–

==== 2020s ====
Year	Title	Album
2020	Top of the Worlds	2021
2020	Hallo Hallo Halloween	2021
2021	Ichi Ni San Shi Go	2021
2021	Game Is Over	2021
2021	Nori Nori Nori	2021
2021	Crazy Little Love (Japanese version)	2021

==== Featured songs ====
Year	Title	Album
1994	Hot Stuff (with Euroteam)	
1997	We're Dancing Together (with Valentina, Lolita & Norma)	Super Eurobeat 79
2001	You Can Fly! You Can Fly! You Can Fly! (with Lolita)	Eurobeat Disney 3
2001	Hakuna Matata (Fun Four (with Mega NRG Man & Brian Ice))	Eurobeat Disney 3
2008	Back To 80's (with Mega NRG Man)	Super Eurobeat 185
2009	Monkey Dance '09 (with Y&Co.)	Super Eurobeat 196 ~Vitamin Pop~
2011	Let's Get It Done Tonight (with Ken Laszlo)	Super Eurobeat 211
2019	Music for the People (with Dave Rodgers & Kaioh)	–

=== As Mirka ===
Year	Title
1993	Valentino Mon Amour
1995	Boom Boom DJ
1995	Shake Me Up (with Valentina)
1996	Diamond Love
1996	Whole Lotta Love
1996	A Lotta Fantasy (with Valentina)
1996	I Love Spaghetti (with Valentina)
1997	Hi Hi Baby
2010	10,000 Lovers

=== As Juliet ===
Year	Title
1993	Big Bang
1993	Heart on Fire
1993	Red Hot
1993	Speak in English
1994	Invasion of Privacy
1994	More Than Your Love
1994	Ticket to Ride
1995	Intuition
1995	Missing You
1995	You and Me

=== As Sheela ===
Year	Title
1993	Kangaroo
1993	Gimme All Your Love
1994	Confusion

== See also ==
- A-Beat-C
- Eurobeat
- Italo disco
- Para Para
