= Mickey Mouse March =

1955 song by Jimmie Dodd

Song
- Released: July 1, 1955 (publication)
- Length: 2:42
- Songwriter: Jimmie Dodd

"Mickey Mouse March" is the opening theme for The Mickey Mouse Club television show, which aired in the United States from October 1955 to 1959, on the ABC television network. The song is reprised with the slower "it's time to say goodbye" verse, at the end of each episode. In the show's opening, the song is partially performed by Jiminy Cricket. It also ended with Donald Duck attempting to hit a gong with the Mickey Mouse Club title on it but would end with comic results, such as him getting hit by lightning, or the gong turning out to be a pie, or Donald just hitting a triangle instead. It has since become the theme song for the titular Mickey Mouse and his franchise.

The song was written by the Mickey Mouse Club host Jimmie Dodd and was published by Hal Leonard Corporation, on July 1, 1955. Dodd, who was a guitarist and musician hired by Walt Disney as a songwriter, wrote other songs used over the course of the series, as well, such as the “theme day” songs sung on the show.

== Covers ==
Julie London covered the song on her 1967 album, Nice Girls Don't Stay for Breakfast. Elvis Presley performed a bit of the song during his May 2, 1975 concert in Atlanta, Georgia. A concert recording of the show was made available on the Follow That Dream Collectors' label release, Southbound - Tampa / Atlanta '75. Mannheim Steamroller covered the song as the final track on the album, Mannheim Steamroller Meets the Mouse (1999). In 2000, a eurobeat version of the song was released on the Japan-only Eurobeat Disney, recorded by Domino and Dave Rodgers. Andrew W.K. also covered the song, on the Japanese-only release of the album Mosh Pit On Disney (2004). In 2017, D-Metal Stars created a Heavy Metal cover of the song on the album "Metal Disney" featuring Mike Vescera and Rudy Sarzo. The song is sung by U.S. Marines in the final scenes of Stanley Kubrick's film Full Metal Jacket (1987).
