= Para Para Paradise =

2000 video game

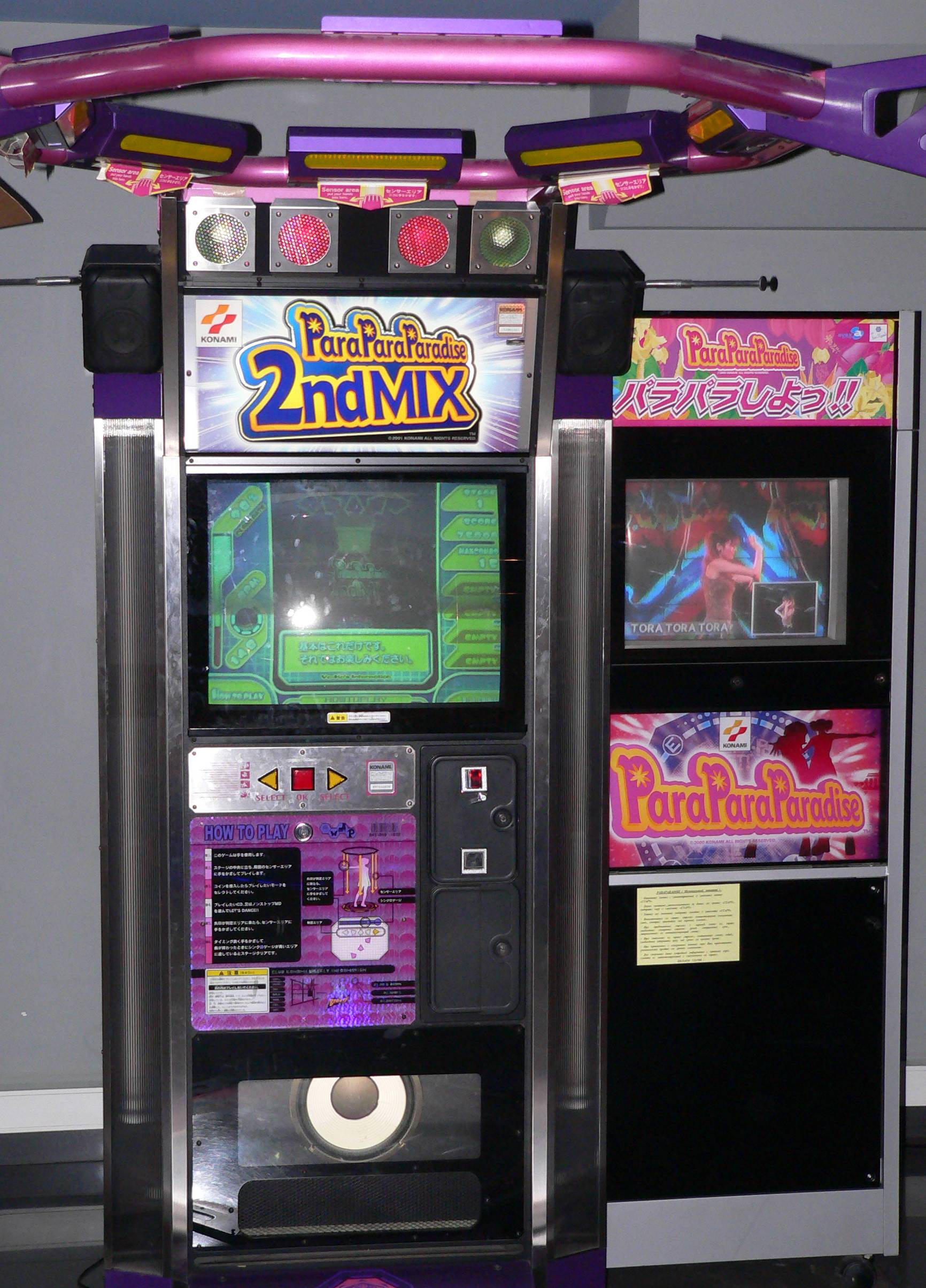
- ParaParaParadise 2nd MIX Arcade Game
- Developer: Konami
- Publisher: Konami
- Platforms: Arcade, PlayStation 2
- Release: 2000
- Genres: Rhythm, music, exercise
- Modes: Single-player, multiplayer
- Arcade system: Firebeat, Viper

ParaParaParadise (パラパラパラダイス, Para Para Paradaisu) is an arcade and PlayStation 2 dance game made by the Japanese company Konami and released under the Bemani moniker following the Para Para fad.

Konami would later release Dance Evolution for the Xbox 360, a game that shares many similarities with Para Para Paradise.

== Music ==
The music used in Para Para Paradise is exclusively fast-paced Eurobeat. The majority of tracks are "true" Para Para tracks from the Avex Trax record label, such as Velfarre 2000, Anniversary and Boom Boom Fire. A portion of the songs are Eurobeat remixes of other Bemani tracks such as CAN'T STOP FALLIN' IN LOVE. There are also two songs that are J-EURO remixes, remixes of J-pop songs (Aishiattemasu and Deluxe, both by Key-A-Kiss).

== Korean version ==
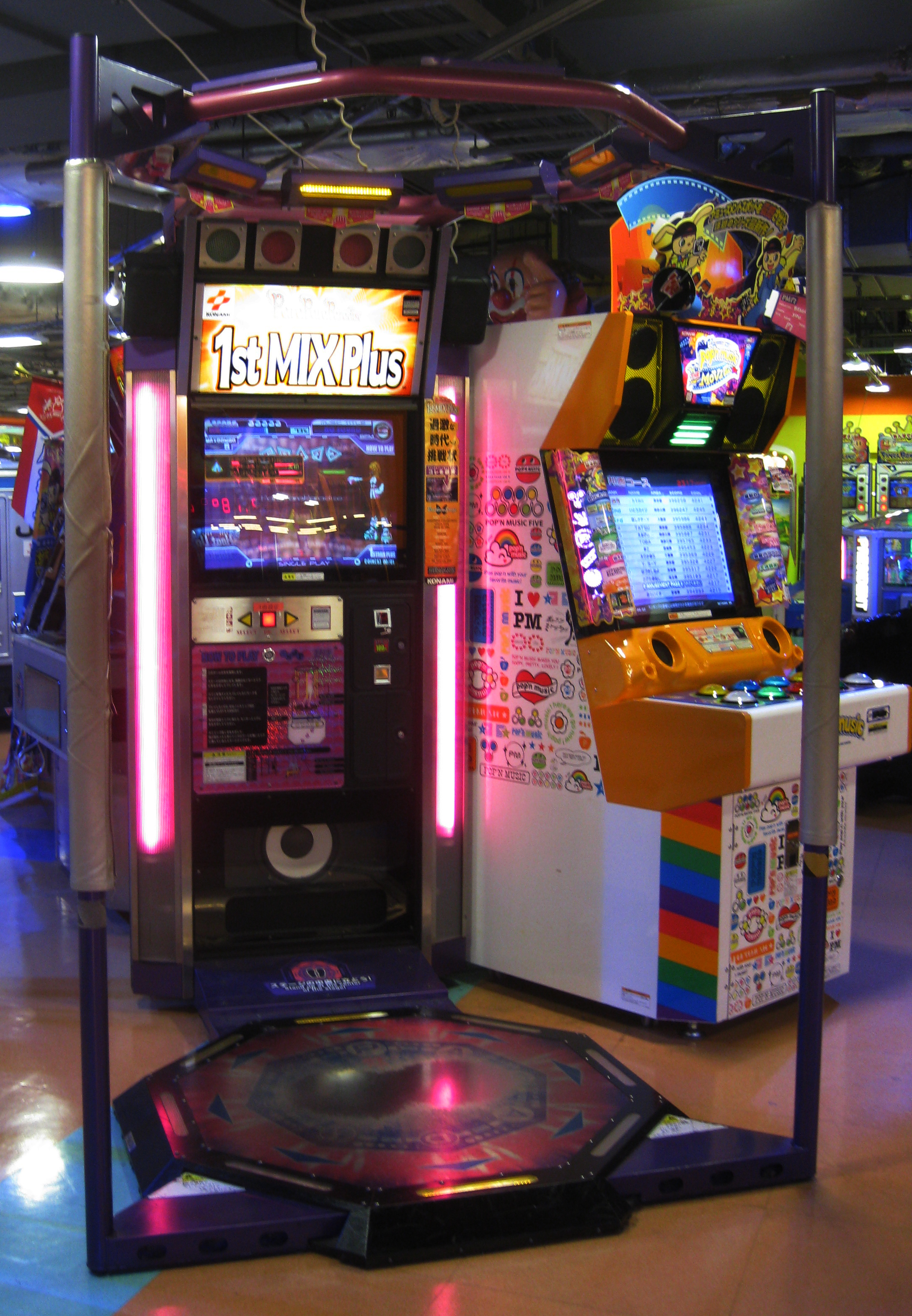
A Para Para Paradise 1st MIX Plus arcade cabinet

A Korean version of ParaParaParadise, called ParaParaDancing was also released. The songlist was changed to feature more Korean music, including a song by S.E.S. Songs by Korean artists, H.O.T. "Hold On Me", sung in Korean, was originally in Japanese. ParaParaDancing also features the ability to play on the reverse side of the stage by setting the machine to sense on the rear 5 out of the total 8 sensors, facing the spectators instead.

== Emulation and simulation ==
The developers of MAME have been working on a way to emulate the arcade machine on a computer.

I've been working on a Konami FireBeat driver for a while now. The hardware is a relatively simple set of stuff. There's currently only one game, Para Para Paradise, dumped. Currently it passes most of its bootup tests (except the RTC/backup RAM test). The test menu is also accessible, but cannot be operated since I haven't found the input ports yet.

— Ville Linde's blog

Since then, 14 other FireBeat games have been dumped, although they still remain marked as not working in MAME. The open-source music game StepMania also has support for ParaParaParadise, and CVS versions of version 4.0 support the PS2 version's controller, although actual simfiles for the game are few.

== Reception ==
On release, Famitsu magazine scored the PlayStation 2 version of the game a 31 out of 40.
