= Mizuki Sano =

Japanese actor

- Born: September 26, 1973 (age 52); Fujinomiya, Shizuoka, Japan

Mizuki Sano (佐野 瑞樹, Sano Mizuki; born September 26, 1973 in Fujinomiya, Shizuoka, Japan) is a Japanese actor and the eldest member of Johnny's Jr., the trainee unit of the well-known talent agency Johnny & Associates. He is perhaps best known for his role in Kindaichi Shounen no Jikenbo and his various activities as a member of Johnny's Jr.

== Biography ==
Mizuki Sano graduated from Fujinomiya West High School, and Shizuoka University with a degree in law. He has a younger brother, Daiki Sano, who is also an actor. Mizuki Ashiya and Izumi Sano, the two main characters in the manga Hanazakari no Kimitachi e, are named after him.

He left Johnny & Associates on December 31, 2018.

== Work ==
Mizuki Sano joined Johnny's in 1991. In 1993, he became a member of the short-lived Johnny's unit J-Eleven and also a member of KinKi Jr., a back-up group for KinKi Kids. In 1995, Sano became a first-generation member of Johnny's Sr., along with Masayuki Sakamoto, Hiroshi Nagano, and Yoshihiko Inohara of V6. Until 1996 he was a back-up dancer for Hikaru Genji, V6, SMAP, and KinKi Kids.

Unlike most of his contemporaries in Johnny's, Sano had never graduated from Junior status until he left the management of Johnny's. He now mainly performs as a stage actor.

- Unnan no Sekai Seifuku Sengen (1994)
- Aji Ichi Monme (TV Asahi, 1995) - Yuusuke
- SALE! (TV Asahi, 1995) - Kouji Kondou
- Kindaichi Shounen no Jikenbo (NTV, 1995–1996) - Makoto Makabe
- V no Honoo (Fuji TV, 1995) - himself
- Hanayome wa 16 sai! (TV Asahi, 1995) - Daisuke Tachibana
- Dareka ga Dareka ni Aishiteru (TBS, March 29, 1996) - Hiroshi Oono
- Gakkou no Kaidan R: "Hitoribocchi no Dousoukai" (Kansai TV, July 20, 1996) - Isao Yoshibashi
- Drama Shounen Suspense Series: Houkenshitsu ni Mita Kyoufu (TV Asahi, 1998) - Kaoru (lead role)
- Keishichou Sousa File: Sakura-sho no Onna-tachi (TV Asahi, July 25, 2007) - Nobuhiro
- Kero Kero Chime (1997) - Makaeru
- Shinrei (1996) - Taka
- Kindaichi Shounen no Jikenbo (1997) - Makoto Makabe
- Shounen-tai Shuen SHOW Geki '92: MASK (May 1992)
- Bishoujo Senshi Sailor Moon (1993) - Mamoru Chiba/Tuxedo Mask
- Hime-chan no Ribbon (1993) - Head of student council
- Haru wo Matsu Ie (1994) - Shouichi Tominoga
- Mizuiro Jidai (1996–1997) - Shikihito Hashimoto
- Harumachi Kusa (January 4-January 25, 1997) - Michitarou
- Hanairo no Ie (1997) - Gennosuke Tokieda
- Waga Machi (December 1997) - George Gibbs
- Yoru no Kobushi (October 9-October 25, 1998) - Kouta
- Hatsumei BOY Kanepan (December 23-January 15, 1998) - Kanepan (lead role)
- Fortinbras (May 8-May 30, 1999) - Fortinbras
- Midare Kami: Yosano Akiko to Kanemoto (October 2-October 28, 1999) - Saburou Tao
- Watashi Datte! (January 3-January 23, 2000) - Daikichi Komatsu
- Kimi wa Ii Hito, Charlie Brown (September 26-March 31, 2001) - Linus van Pelt
- Ude ni Oboeari (December 1-December 25, 2000) - Seinoshin Hiranuma
- Abarenbō Shōgun: Ken Matsudaira's New Year's Special (January 2-January 27, 2001) - Kishuu Motokage
- Koufuku Onrei (September 2-September 26, 2001) - Akimasa Ootaka
- Fuyu no Undoukai (November 2-November 27, 2001) - Kouichi Senkubo
- Yumemiru Onna (February 2-February 17, 2002) - Youichi Tadakoro
- Fortinbras (April 27-May 5, 2002) - Fortinbras
- Yome mo Shuutome mo Mina Yuurei (August 10-August 25, 2002) - Yuu Sakuma
- Tsuma-tachi no Rokumeikan (November 1-November 26, 2002) - Kenchou Suematsu
- Hakaba Naki Shisha (January 29-February 2, 2003) - Furansowa
- Edokko Geisha: Yumeyakko Funtouki (April 10-May 25, 2003) - Taiyou Yamamoto
- Comic Jack (2003) - Asato Teppen (lead role)
- Omoshiroi Machi (August 20-October 11, 2003) - Tooru Makino
- Sora no Kaa-sama (November 2-November 29, 2003) - Shousuke Kameyama
- Love Letter (February 12-March 9, 2004) - Satoshi
- Yome mo Shuutome mo Mina Yuurei (August 4-August 28, 2004) - Yuu Sakuma
- Gekijou no Kami-sama (January 5-February 26, 2005) - Sen'ichi Kondou, Genzaburou Yagyuu
- Gogo no Yuigonjou (May 5-June 28, 2005) - Daigorou Nishioka
- Akai Yuuhi no Saigon Hotel (August 8-September 30, 2005) - Gwen
- Yonjuuni Choume no Kingdom (November 11-November 27, 2005) - Makoto Tashiro, Kouhei Ootaguro
- Love Letter (June 24-July 2, 2006) - Satoshi
- *pnish* vol. 8 Wonder Box (September 21-September 26, 2006) - Atsushi Shindou
- Gakuraku Home e Irasshai (April 13-April 27, 2007)
- Shakes (October 4-October 21, 2007) - lead role
- Trifle (February 2-February 10, 2008) - lead role
- *pnish* vol. 10 Samurai Mode (June 11-June 15, 2008) - Ryoumei
- Eve no Subete (September 6-October 4, 2008)
- Onna tachino Chuushingura (May 6–26, 2013)
