= List of Inuyasha episodes =

Promotional Yomiuri TV poster, featuring Kagome Higurashi (left) and Inuyasha (right)

The episodes of the Japanese anime television series Inuyasha are based on the first 36 volumes for Rumiko Takahashi's manga series. It follows an eponymous half-demon and a high school girl Kagome Higurashi on a journey, alongside their friends, a young fox demon, Shippo; a lecherous monk, Miroku; a demon slayer, Sango; and a demon cat, Kirara, to obtain the fragments of the shattered Jewel of Four Souls, a powerful jewel hidden from Kagome, and keep the shards from being used for evil, including by the half-demon Naraku.

Produced by Sunrise, the series aired on Yomiuri TV, Nippon Television and their affiliates in Japan, from October 16, 2000, to September 13, 2004. It also aired on Animax's English-language networks in South Asia and East Asia. The English dub of the series aired on Adult Swim for Cartoon Network, from August 31, 2002, to October 27, 2006. In Canada, the series aired on YTV.

A sequel anime television series, titled Inuyasha: The Final Act, aired from October 4, 2009, to March 30, 2010. It adapted the final volumes of the manga.

== Series overview ==
Season	Episodes	Originally released	
Season	Episodes	First released	Last released
1	44	October 16, 2000	September 17, 2001
2	43	October 8, 2001	September 16, 2002
3	40	October 14, 2002	September 15, 2003
4	40	October 13, 2003	September 13, 2004
TFA	26	October 4, 2009	March 30, 2010

== Episode list ==
=== Season 1 (2000–01) ===
No. overall	No. in season	Title	Directed by	Written by	Storyboarded by	Original release date	English air date
1	1	"The Girl Who Overcame Time... and the Boy Who Was Just Overcome"; Transliteration: "Toki o Koeta Shōjo to Fūinsareta Shōnen" (Japanese: 時代を越えた少女と封印された少年)	Masashi Ikeda	Masashi Ikeda	Masashi Ikeda	October 16, 2000	August 31, 2002
2	2	"Seekers of the Sacred Jewel"; Transliteration: "Shikon no Tama o Nerau Monotachi" (Japanese: 四魂の玉を狙う者たち)	Takashi Ikehata	Masashi Ikeda	Masashi Ikeda	October 23, 2000	September 7, 2002
3	3	"Down the Rabbit Hole and Back Again"; Transliteration: "Honekui no Ido kara Tadaima!" (Japanese: 骨喰いの井戸からただいまっ！)	Tatsuya Ishihara	Katsuyuki Sumisawa	Tatsuya Ishihara	October 30, 2000	September 14, 2002
4	4	"Yura of the Demon-Hair"; Transliteration: "Sakasagami no Yōma Yūra" (Japanese: 逆髪の妖魔 結羅)	Megumi Yamamoto	Katsuyuki Sumisawa	Toshifumi Kawase	November 6, 2000	September 21, 2002
5	5	"Aristocratic Assassin, Sesshomaru"; Transliteration: "Senritsu no Kikōshi Sesshōmaru" (Japanese: 戦慄の貴公子 殺生丸)	Hitoyuki Matsui	Katsuhiko Chiba	Hitoyuki Matsui	November 13, 2000	September 28, 2002
6	6	"Tetsusaiga, the Phantom Sword"; Transliteration: "Bukimi na Yōtō Tessaiga" (Japanese: 不気味な妖刀 鉄砕牙)	Masakazu Hishida	Katsuhiko Chiba	Akira Nishimori	November 20, 2000	October 5, 2002
7	7	"Showdown! Inuyasha vs. Sesshomaru!"; Transliteration: "Gekitaiketsu! Sesshōmaru tai Tessaiga!" (Japanese: 激対決！殺生丸VS鉄砕牙!!)	Kunihiro Mori, Satoshi Toba	Katsuhiko Chiba	Masashi Ikeda	November 27, 2000	October 12, 2002
8	8	"The Toad Who Would Be Prince"; Transliteration: "Tono Yōkai Tsukumo no Gama" (Japanese: 殿様妖怪 九十九の蝦蟇)	Takashi Ikehata	Takashi Yamada	Toshifumi Kawase	December 4, 2000	October 19, 2002
9	9	"Enter Shippo... Plus, the Amazing Thunder Brothers!"; Transliteration: "Shippō Tōjō! Raijū Kyōdai Hiten Manten" (Japanese: 七宝登場！雷獣兄弟 飛天満天!!)	Megumi Yamamoto	Katsuyuki Sumisawa	Akira Nishimori	December 11, 2000	October 26, 2002
10	10	"Phantom Showdown: The Thunder Brothers vs. Tetsusaiga"; Transliteration: "Yōtō Gekitotsu! Raigekijin tai Tessaiga" (Japanese: 妖刀激突！雷撃刃VS鉄砕牙!!)	Hitoyuki Matsui	Katsuyuki Sumisawa	Hitoyuki Matsui	December 18, 2000	November 2, 2002
11	11	"Terror of the Ancient Noh Mask"; Transliteration: "Gendai ni Yomigaeru Noroi no Nōmen" (Japanese: 現代によみがえる呪いの能面)	Tatsuya Ishihara	Masashi Ikeda	Masashi Ikeda	January 15, 2001	November 9, 2002
12	12	"The Soul Piper and the Mischievous Little Soul"; Transliteration: "Tatari Mokke to Chiisana Akuryō" (Japanese: タタリモッケと小さな悪霊)	Kaoru Suzuki	Tetsuko Takahashi	Susumu Nishizawa	January 22, 2001	November 16, 2002
13	13	"The Mystery of the New Moon and the Black-Haired Inuyasha"; Transliteration: "Shingetsu no Nazo! Kurogami no Inuyasha" (Japanese: 新月の謎 黒髪の犬夜叉)	Masakazu Hishida	Katsuhiko Chiba	Tatsuya Ishihara	January 29, 2001	November 23, 2002
14	14	"Kikyo's Stolen Ashes"; Transliteration: "Nusumareta Kikyō no Reikotsu" (Japanese: 盗まれた桔梗の霊骨)	Megumi Yamamoto	Akinori Endo	Takashi Ikehata	February 5, 2001	November 30, 2002
15	15	"Return of the Tragic Priestess, Kikyo"; Transliteration: "Hiun no Miko Kikyō Fukkatsu" (Japanese: 悲運の巫女 桔梗復活)	Tatsuya Ishihara	Akinori Endo	Tatsuya Ishihara, Toshifumi Kawase	February 12, 2001	December 7, 2002
16	16	"Mystical Hand of the Amorous Monk, Miroku"; Transliteration: "Migi Te ni Kazaana Furyō Hōshi Miroku" (Japanese: 右手に風穴 不良法師 弥勒)	Hitoyuki Matsui	Takashi Yamada	Hitoyuki Matsui	February 19, 2001	December 7, 2002
17	17	"Cursed Ink of the Hell-Painter"; Transliteration: "Jigoku Eshi no Kegareta Sumi" (Japanese: 地獄絵師の汚れた墨)	Kaoru Suzuki	Katsuyuki Sumisawa	Akira Nishimori	February 26, 2001	December 14, 2002
18	18	"Naraku and Sesshomaru Join Forces"; Transliteration: "Te o Kunda Naraku to Sesshōmaru" (Japanese: 手を組んだ奈落と殺生丸)	Masakazu Hishida	Ai Ota	Kazuhisa Takenouchi	March 5, 2001	December 14, 2002
19	19	"Go Home to Your Own Time, Kagome!"; Transliteration: "Kaere, Kagome! Omae no Jidai ni" (Japanese: 帰れ、かごめ！お前の時代に)	Akira Nishimori	Ai Ota	Akira Nishimori	March 12, 2001	December 21, 2002
20	20	"Despicable Villain! The Mystery of Onigumo!"; Transliteration: "Asamashiki Yatō, Onigumo no Nazo" (Japanese: あさましき野盗 鬼蜘蛛の謎)	Tatsuya Ishihara	Takashi Yamada	Tatsuya Ishihara	March 19, 2001	December 21, 2002
21 (Note: Episodes 21 and 22 originally aired together as a one-hour special on Japanese television titled 奈落の真実に迫る桔梗の魂 前編 / 後編 (Naraku's True Identity; Kikyō's Wandering Soul (Part 1 / Part 2)). The broadcast version of Episode 21 is 5 minutes longer than the standard version. Also included in Japanese DVD and some european DVD release, but not Blu-ray release.)	21	"Naraku's True Identity Unveiled"; Transliteration: "Gojū Nen Mae no Shinjitsu; Naraku no Shōtai" (Japanese: 50年前の真実 奈落の正体)	Satoshi Toba	Takashi Yamada	Takashi Ikehata	April 9, 2001	December 28, 2002
22	22	"A Wicked Smile; Kikyo's Wandering Soul"; Transliteration: "Ashiki Bishō; Samayō Kikyō no Tamashii" (Japanese: 悪しき微笑 さまよう桔梗の魂)	Megumi Yamamoto	Akinori Endo	Masami Hata	April 9, 2001	December 28, 2002
23	23	"Kagome's Voice and Kikyo's Kiss"; Transliteration: "Kagome no Koe to Kikyō no Kuchizuke" (Japanese: かごめの声と桔梗の口づけ)	Kaoru Suzuki	Akinori Endo	Masami Hata	April 16, 2001	January 14, 2003
24	24	"Enter Sango the Demon Slayer"; Transliteration: "Yōkaitaijiya, Sango Tōjō!" (Japanese: 妖怪退治屋 珊瑚登場！)	Akira Nishimori	Katsuyuki Sumisawa	Akira Nishimori	April 23, 2001	January 15, 2003
25	25	"Naraku's Insidious Plot"; Transliteration: "Naraku no Bōryaku o Uchi Yabure!" (Japanese: 奈落の謀略をうち破れ！)	Hitoyuki Matsui	Katsuyuki Sumisawa	Hitoyuki Matsui	May 7, 2001	January 16, 2003
26	26	"Secret of the Jewel of Four Souls Revealed"; Transliteration: "Tsui ni Akasareta Shikon no Himitsu" (Japanese: ついに明かされた四魂の秘密)	Tatsuya Ishihara	Katsuyuki Sumisawa	Masami Hata	May 14, 2001	January 17, 2003
27	27	"The Lake of the Evil Water God"; Transliteration: "Suijin ga Shihaisuru Yami no Mizuumi" (Japanese: 水神が支配する闇の湖)	Megumi Yamamoto	Tetsuko Takahashi	Masami Hata	May 21, 2001	January 21, 2003
28	28	"Miroku Falls Into a Dangerous Trap"; Transliteration: "Kakokuna Wana ni Kakatta Miroku" (Japanese: 過酷な罠にかかった弥勒)	Masakazu Hishida	Takashi Yamada	Akira Nishimori	May 28, 2001	January 22, 2003
29	29	"Sango's Suffering and Kohaku's Life"; Transliteration: "Sango no Kunō to Kohaku no Inochi" (Japanese: 珊瑚の苦悩と琥珀の命)	Masashi Abe	Akinori Endo	Akira Nishimori	June 4, 2001	January 23, 2003
30	30	"Tetsusaiga Is Stolen! Showdown at Naraku's Castle!"; Transliteration: "Nusumareta Tessaiga Taiketsu Naraku no Shiro!" (Japanese: 盗まれた鉄砕牙 対決 奈落の城!)	Tatsuya Ishihara	Akinori Endo	Tatsuya Ishihara	June 11, 2001	January 24, 2003
31	31	"Jinenji, Kind Yet Sad"; Transliteration: "Kokoroyasashiki Aishū no Jinenji" (Japanese: 心優しき哀愁の地念児)	Akira Nishimori	Katsuyuki Sumisawa	Mitsuko Kase	June 18, 2001	January 28, 2003
32	32	"Kikyo and Inuyasha, Into the Miasma"; Transliteration: "Jaki ni Ochita Kikyō to Inuyasha" (Japanese: 邪気に落ちた桔梗と犬夜叉)	Satoshi Toba	Ai Ota	Masami Hata	June 25, 2001	January 29, 2003
33	33	"Kikyo, Captured by Naraku"; Transliteration: "Torawareta Kikyō to Naraku" (Japanese: 囚われた桔梗と奈落)	Masakazu Hishida	Ai Ota	Masami Hata	July 2, 2001	January 30, 2003
34	34	"Tetsusaiga and Tenseiga"; Transliteration: "Tenseiga to Tessaiga" (Japanese: 天生牙と鉄砕牙)	Tatsuya Ishihara	Takashi Yamada	Hitoyuki Matsui	July 9, 2001	January 31, 2003
35	35	"The True Owner of the Great Sword!"; Transliteration: "Meitō ga Erabu Shin no Tsukai Te" (Japanese: 名刀が選ぶ真の使い手)	Takehiro Nakayama	Takashi Yamada	Akira Nishimori	July 16, 2001	February 3, 2003
36	36	"Kagome Kidnapped by Koga, the Wolf Demon!"; Transliteration: "Kagome Ryakudatsu! Chōsoku no Yōrō Kōga!" (Japanese: かごめ略奪! 超速の妖狼 鋼牙)	Yasunao Aoki	Katsuyuki Sumisawa	Mitsuko Kase	July 23, 2001	February 4, 2003
37	37	"The Man Who Fell in Love with Kagome!"; Transliteration: "Kagome ni Horeta Aitsu" (Japanese: かごめに惚れたあいつ)	Satoshi Toba	Katsuyuki Sumisawa	Mitsuko Kase	July 30, 2001	August 25, 2003
38	38	"Two Hearts, One Mind"; Transliteration: "Hanarete Kayou Futari no Kimochi" (Japanese: はなれて通うふたりの気持ち)	Takahiro Okada	Takashi Yamada	Yasunao Aoki	August 6, 2001	August 26, 2003
39	39	"Trapped in a Duel to the Death!"; Transliteration: "Shikumareta Shitō" (Japanese: 仕組まれた死闘)	Tatsuya Ishihara	Katsuyuki Sumisawa	Masami Hata	August 13, 2001	August 27, 2003
40	40	"The Deadly Trap of Kagura the Wind Sorceress!"; Transliteration: "Kazetsukai Kagura no Yōennaru Wana" (Japanese: 風使い神楽の妖艶なる罠)	Masakazu Hishida	Katsuyuki Sumisawa	Masami Hata	August 20, 2001	August 28, 2003
41	41	"Kagura's Dance and Kanna's Mirror"; Transliteration: "Kagura no Mai to Kanna no Kagami" (Japanese: 神楽の舞と神無の鏡)	Satoshi Toba	Akinori Endo	Yasunao Aoki	August 27, 2001	September 1, 2003
42	42	"The Wind Scar Fails"; Transliteration: "Yaburareta Kaze no Kizu" (Japanese: 破られた風の傷)	Naoki Hishikawa	Akinori Endo	Eiji Yamanaka	September 3, 2001	September 2, 2003
43	43	"Tetsusaiga Breaks"; Transliteration: "Tsui ni Oreta Tessaiga!" (Japanese: ついに折れた鉄砕牙!)	Tatsuya Ishihara	Tetsuko Takahashi	Akira Nishimori	September 10, 2001	September 3, 2003
44	44	"Kaijinbo's Evil Sword"; Transliteration: "Kaijinbō no Jaaku na Tsurugi" (Japanese: 灰刃坊の邪悪な剣)	Masakazu Amiya	Takashi Yamada	Tatsuya Ishihara	September 17, 2001	September 4, 2003

=== Season 2 (2001–02) ===
No. overall	No. in season	Title	Directed by	Written by	Storyboarded by	Original release date	English air date
45	1	"Sesshomaru Wields Tokijin"; Transliteration: "Sesshōmaru, Tōkijin o Furū" (Japanese: 殺生丸、闘鬼神を振るう)	Teruo Sato	Junki Takegami	Yasunao Aoki	October 8, 2001	September 8, 2003
46	2	"Juromaru and Kageromaru"; Transliteration: "Jūrōmaru to Kagerōmaru" (Japanese: 獣郎丸と影郎丸)	Satoshi Toba	Takashi Yamada	Mitsuko Kase	October 15, 2001	September 9, 2003
47	3	"Onigumo's Heart Still Beats Within Naraku"; Transliteration: "Naraku ni Nokoru Onigumo no Kokoro" (Japanese: 奈落に残る鬼蜘蛛の心)	Masakazu Amiya	Takashi Yamada	Eiji Yamanaka	October 22, 2001	September 10, 2003
48	4	"Return to the Place Where We First Met"; Transliteration: "Deatta Basho ni Kaeritai!" (Japanese: 出会った場所に帰りたい!)	Tatsuya Ishihara	Takashi Yamada	Tatsuya Ishihara	October 29, 2001	September 11, 2003
49	5	"Kohaku's Lost Memory"; Transliteration: "Ushinawareta Kohaku no Kioku" (Japanese: 失われた琥珀の記憶)	Masakazu Hishida	Junki Takegami	Masakazu Hishida	November 5, 2001	September 15, 2003
50	6	"That Unforgettable Face!"; Transliteration: "Ano Kao ga Kokoro kara Kienai" (Japanese: あの顔が心から消えない)	Megumi Yamamoto	Junki Takegami	Hitoyuki Matsui	November 12, 2001	September 16, 2003
51	7	"Inuyasha's Soul, Devoured"; Transliteration: "Kokoro o Kuwareta Inuyasha" (Japanese: 心を喰われた犬夜叉)	Satoshi Toba	Junki Takegami	Mitsuko Kase	November 19, 2001	September 17, 2003
52	8	"The Demon's True Nature"; Transliteration: "Tomerarenai! Yōkai no Honshou" (Japanese: 止められない! 妖怪の本性)	Masakazu Amiya	Junki Takegami	Masakazu Amiya	November 26, 2001	September 18, 2003
53	9	"Father's Old Enemy: Ryukotsusei"; Transliteration: "Chichi no Shukuteki - Ryūkotsusei" (Japanese: 父の宿敵 竜骨精)	Tatsuya Ishihara	Katsuyuki Sumisawa	Tatsuya Ishihara	December 3, 2001	April 24, 2004
54	10	"The Backlash Wave: Tetsusaiga's Ultimate Technique"; Transliteration: "Tessaiga no Ougi - Bakuryūha" (Japanese: 鉄砕牙の奥義 爆流破)	Megumi Yamamoto	Katsuyuki Sumisawa	Masami Hata	December 10, 2001	May 1, 2004
55	11	"The Stone Flower and Shippo's First Love"; Transliteration: "Ishi no Hana to Shippō no Hatsukoi" (Japanese: 石の花と七宝の初恋)	Satoshi Toba	Tetsuko Takahashi	Mitsuko Kase	December 17, 2001	May 8, 2004
56	12	"Temptress in the Mist"; Transliteration: "Kiri no Oku ni Bijo no Yūwaku" (Japanese: 霧の奥に美女の誘惑)	Kiyoshi Fukumoto	Katsuhiko Chiba	Kiyoshi Fukumoto	January 14, 2002	May 15, 2004
57	13	"Fateful Night in Togenkyo, Part I"; Transliteration: "Subete wa Tōgenkyō no Yoru ni (Zenpen)" (Japanese: すべては桃源郷の夜に 前編)	Masakazu Amiya	Katsuyuki Sumisawa	Eiji Yamanaka	January 21, 2002	May 22, 2004
58	14	"Fateful Night in Togenkyo, Part II"; Transliteration: "Subete wa Tōgenkyō no Yoru ni (Kōhen)" (Japanese: すべては桃源郷の夜に 後編)	Tatsuya Ishihara	Katsuyuki Sumisawa	Tatsuya Ishihara	January 28, 2002	May 29, 2004
59	15	"The Beautiful Sister Apprentices"; Transliteration: "Bishōjo Shimai no Deshiiri Shigan" (Japanese: 美少女姉妹の弟子入り志願)	Satoshi Toba	Junki Takegami	Mitsuko Kase	February 4, 2002	June 5, 2004
60	16	"The 50 Year-Old Curse of the Dark Priestess"; Transliteration: "Kuro Miko Gojūnen no Noroi" (Japanese: 黒巫女 五十年の呪い)	Hirofumi Ogura	Katsuhiko Chiba	Toshiya Niidome	February 11, 2002	June 12, 2004
61	17	"Kikyo and the Dark Priestess"; Transliteration: "Arawareta Kikyō to Shikigami Tsukai" (Japanese: 現れた桔梗と式神使い)	Kiyoshi Fukumoto	Junki Takegami	Kiyoshi Fukumoto	February 18, 2002	June 19, 2004
62	18	"Tsubaki's Unrelenting Evil Spell"; Transliteration: "Sokoshirenu Tsubaki no Jubaku" (Japanese: 底知れぬ椿の呪縛)	Masakazu Amiya	Katsuyuki Sumisawa	Masakazu Amiya	March 4, 2002	June 26, 2004
63	19	"The Red and White Priestesses"; Transliteration: "Ikute o Habamu Kōhaku Miko" (Japanese: 行く手を阻む紅白巫女)	Tatsuya Ishihara	Katsuhiko Chiba	Tatsuya Ishihara	March 11, 2002	July 3, 2004
64	20	"Giant Ogre of the Forbidden Tower"; Transliteration: "Tahōtō no Kyodai na Oni" (Japanese: 多宝塔の巨大な鬼)	Megumi Yamamoto	Katsuhiko Chiba	Megumi Yamamoto	March 18, 2002	July 10, 2004
65	21	"Farewell Days of My Youth"; Transliteration: "Saraba Seishun no Hibi" (Japanese: さらば青春の日々)	Satoshi Toba	Junki Takegami	Mitsuko Kase	April 8, 2002	July 17, 2004
66	22	"Naraku's Barrier - Kagura's Decision"; Transliteration: "Naraku no Kekkai - Kagura no Kesshin" (Japanese: 奈落の結界 神楽の決心)	Kiyoshi Fukumoto	Tetsuko Takahashi	Kiyoshi Fukumoto	April 15, 2002	July 24, 2004
67	23	"The Howling Wind of Betrayal"; Transliteration: "Fukiareru Uragiri no Kaze" (Japanese: 吹き荒れる裏切りの風)	Masakazu Amiya	Tetsuko Takahashi	Susumu Nishizawa	April 22, 2002	July 31, 2004
68	24	"Shippo Gets an Angry Challenge"; Transliteration: "Shippō e Ikari no Chosenjō" (Japanese: 七宝へ怒りの挑戦状)	Yasuhiro Takemoto	Katsuyuki Sumisawa	Yasuhiro Takemoto	May 6, 2002	August 7, 2004
69	25	"Terror of the Faceless Man"; Transliteration: "Kao no Nai Otoko no Kyōfu" (Japanese: 顔のない男の恐怖)	Teruo Sato	Katsuhiko Chiba	Eiji Yamanaka	May 13, 2002	August 14, 2004
70	26	"Onigumo's Memory Restored"; Transliteration: "Yomigaetta Onigumo no Kioku" (Japanese: よみがえった鬼蜘蛛の記憶)	Megumi Yamamoto	Katsuhiko Chiba	Toshiya Niidome	May 20, 2002	August 21, 2004
71	27	"Three-Sided Battle to the Death"; Transliteration: "Mitsudomoe no Shitō no Hate" (Japanese: 三つ巴の死闘の果て)	Satoshi Toba	Katsuhiko Chiba	Masami Hata	May 27, 2002	August 28, 2004
72	28	"Totosai's Rigid Training"; Transliteration: "Tōtōsai no Kimyō na Shiren" (Japanese: 刀々斎の珍妙な試練)	Kiyoshi Fukumoto	Junki Takegami	Kiyoshi Fukumoto	June 3, 2002	September 4, 2004
73	29	"Shiori's Family and Inuyasha's Feelings"; Transliteration: "Shiori Ayako to Aitsu no Kimochi" (Japanese: 紫織母子とアイツの気持ち)	Tatsuya Ishihara	Akatsuki Yamatoya	Tatsuya Ishihara	June 10, 2002	September 11, 2004
74	30	"The Red Tetsusaiga Breaks the Barrier!"; Transliteration: "Kekkai Yaburu Akai Tessaiga" (Japanese: 結界破る赤い鉄砕牙)	Masakazu Amiya	Akatsuki Yamatoya	Masami Hata	June 17, 2002	September 18, 2004
75	31	"The Plot of the Panther Devas"; Transliteration: "Hyōneko Shitennō no Inbou" (Japanese: 豹猫四天王の陰謀)	Teruo Sato	Katsuhiko Chiba	Eiji Yamanaka	June 24, 2002	September 25, 2004
76	32	"Target: Sesshomaru and Inuyasha"; Transliteration: "Tāgetto wa Sesshōmaru to Inuyasha" (Japanese: 標的は殺生丸と犬夜叉!)	Megumi Yamamoto	Katsuhiko Chiba	Megumi Yamamoto	July 1, 2002	October 2, 2004
77	33	"The Panther Tribe and the Two Swords of the Fang"; Transliteration: "Hyōnekozoku to Futatsu no Kiba no Ken" (Japanese: 豹猫族とふたつの牙の剣)	Satoshi Toba	Katsuhiko Chiba	Masami Hata	July 8, 2002	October 9, 2004
78	34	"Only You, Sango"; Transliteration: "Sango Mezashite Onrī Yū" (Japanese: 珊瑚目指してオンリーユー)	Tatsuya Ishihara	Akatsuki Yamatoya	Tatsuya Ishihara	July 15, 2002	October 16, 2004
79	35	"Jaken's Plan to Steal Tetsusaiga"; Transliteration: "Jaken no Tessaiga bun Torisakusen" (Japanese: 邪見の鉄砕牙ブン取り作戦)	Kiyoshi Fukumoto	Tetsuko Takahashi	Kiyoshi Fukumoto	July 22, 2002	January 10, 2005
80	36	"Sesshomaru and the Abducted Rin"; Transliteration: "Sesshōmaru to Sarawareta Rin" (Japanese: 殺生丸とさらわれたりん)	Masakazu Amiya	Junki Takegami	Hitoyuki Matsui	July 29, 2002	January 11, 2005
81	37	"Vanishing Point; Naraku Disappears"; Transliteration: "Tachikireru Naraku no Yukue" (Japanese: 断ち切れる奈落の行方)	Teruo Sato	Junki Takegami	Teruo Sato	August 5, 2002	January 12, 2005
82	38	"Gap Between the Ages"; Transliteration: "Gendai to Sengoku no Hazama" (Japanese: 現代と戦国のはざま)	Megumi Yamamoto	Akatsuki Yamatoya	Megumi Yamamoto	August 12, 2002	January 17, 2005
83	39	"The Female Wolf-Demon and the Lunar Rainbow Promise"; Transliteration: "Onna Yōrōzoku to Gekkō no Yakusoku" (Japanese: 女妖狼族と月虹の約束)	Tatsuya Ishihara	Tetsuko Takahashi	Tatsuya Ishihara	August 19, 2002	January 18, 2005
84	40	"Koga's Bride-To-Be"; Transliteration: "Chōsoku no Hanayome Kōho" (Japanese: 超速の花嫁候補)	Satoshi Toba	Tetsuko Takahashi	Eiji Yamanaka	August 26, 2002	January 19, 2005
85	41	"The Evil Within Demon's Head Castle"; Transliteration: "Jaki ga Michiru Oni no Kubi Jō" (Japanese: 邪気が満ちる鬼の首城)	Kiyoshi Fukumoto	Junki Takegami	Kiyoshi Fukumoto	September 2, 2002	January 24, 2005
86	42	"Secret of the Possessed Princess"; Transliteration: "Yorishiro no Hime no Himitsu" (Japanese: 依り代の姫の秘密)	Masakazu Amiya	Akatsuki Yamatoya	Hitoyuki Matsui	September 9, 2002	January 25, 2005
87	43	"Kikyo's Lonely Journey"; Transliteration: "Meguru Kikyō no Kodoku na Tabiji" (Japanese: めぐる桔梗の孤独な旅路)	Teruo Sato	Katsuyuki Sumisawa	Eiji Yamanaka	September 16, 2002	January 26, 2005

=== Season 3 (2002–03) ===
No. overall	No. in season	Title	Directed by	Written by	Storyboarded by	Original release date	English air date
88	1	"The Three Sprites of the Monkey God"; Transliteration: "Sarugamisama no San Seirei" (Japanese: 猿神さまの三精霊)	Tatsuya Ishihara	Katsuhiko Chiba	Tatsuya Ishihara	October 14, 2002	January 31, 2005
89	2	"Nursing Battle of the Rival Lovers"; Transliteration: "Aitsu to Kare Omimai Taiketsu" (Japanese: アイツと彼のお見舞い対決)	Megumi Yamamoto	Katsuhiko Chiba	Megumi Yamamoto	October 21, 2002	February 1, 2005
90	3	"Sota's Brave Confession of Love"; Transliteration: "Omoikitta Sōta no Kokuhaku" (Japanese: 思いきった草太の告白)	Satoshi Toba	Akatsuki Yamatoya	Hitoyuki Matsui	October 28, 2002	February 2, 2005
91	4	"The Suspicious Faith Healer and the Black Kirara"; Transliteration: "Ayashii Kitōshi to Kuroi Kirara" (Japanese: 怪しい祈祷師と黒い雲母)	Teruo Sato	Junki Takegami	Teruo Sato	November 4, 2002	February 7, 2005
92	5	"Plot of the Walking Dead"; Transliteration: "Fukkatsu Shita Monotachi no Yabō" (Japanese: 復活した者たちの野望)	Masakazu Amiya	Tetsuko Takahashi	Masami Hata	November 18, 2002	February 8, 2005
93	6	"The Mysterious, Lecherous Monk"; Transliteration: "Shutsubotsu Suru Nazo no Sukebe Hōshi" (Japanese: 出没する謎の助平法師)	Tatsuya Ishihara	Akatsuki Yamatoya	Tatsuya Ishihara	November 25, 2002	February 9, 2005
94	7	"The Sacred Jewel Maker Part I"; Transliteration: "Shikon no Tama o Tsukuru Mono (Zenpen)" (Japanese: 四魂の玉を造る者 前編)	Satoshi Toba	Katsuhiko Chiba	Toshiya Niidome	December 2, 2002	February 14, 2005
95	8	"The Sacred Jewel Maker Part II"; Transliteration: "Shikon no Tama o Tsukuru Mono (Kōhen)" (Japanese: 四魂の玉を造る者 後編)	Masakazu Amiya	Katsuhiko Chiba	Akira Nishimori	December 9, 2002	February 15, 2005
96	9	"Jaken Falls Ill"; Transliteration: "Byōki ni Natta Ano Jaken" (Japanese: 病気になったあの邪見)	Kiyoshi Fukumoto	Katsuyuki Sumisawa	Kiyoshi Fukumoto	January 13, 2003	February 16, 2005
97	10	"Kirara Come Home!"; Transliteration: "Kaette Konai Kirara" (Japanese: 帰ってこない雲母)	Megumi Yamamoto	Akatsuki Yamatoya	Megumi Yamamoto	January 20, 2003	February 21, 2005
98	11	"Kikyo and Kagome: Alone in the Cave"; Transliteration: "Dōkutsu ni wa Kikyō to Kagome no Futari Dake" (Japanese: 洞窟には桔梗とかごめの二人だけ)	Tatsuya Ishihara	Akatsuki Yamatoya	Tatsuya Ishihara	January 27, 2003	February 22, 2005
99	12	"Koga and Sesshomaru, A Dangerous Encounter"; Transliteration: "Kōga to Sesshōmaru, Kiken Sōgū" (Japanese: 鋼牙と殺生丸 危険な遭遇)	Teruo Sato	Katsuhiko Chiba	Toshiya Niidome	February 3, 2003	February 23, 2005
100	13	"The Truth Behind the Nightmare: Battle in the Forest of Sorrow"; Transliteration: "Akumu no Shinjitsu: Nageki no Muri no Tatakai" (Japanese: 悪夢の真実 嘆きの森の戦い)	Megumi Yamamoto	Katsuyuki Sumisawa	Megumi Yamamoto	February 10, 2003	February 28, 2005
101	14	"The Snow from Seven Years Past"; Transliteration: "Are Kara Shichinen Me no Nagori Yuki" (Japanese: あれから七年目のなごり雪)	Kiyoshi Fukumoto	Junki Takegami	Kiyoshi Fukumoto	February 17, 2003	March 1, 2005
102	15	"Assault on the Wolf-Demon Tribe!"; Transliteration: "Bōrei ni Ozowareta Yōrōzoku" (Japanese: 亡霊に襲われた妖狼族)	Satoshi Toba	Tetsuko Takahashi	Akira Nishimori	February 24, 2003	May 28, 2005
103	16	"The Band of Seven, Resurrected!"; Transliteration: "Yomigaetta Shichinintai" (Japanese: よみがえった七人隊)	Tatsuya Ishihara	Junki Takegami	Tatsuya Ishihara	March 3, 2003	June 4, 2005
104	17	"The Stealthy Poison Master: Mukotsu!"; Transliteration: "Shinobiyoru Doku Tsukai: Mukotsu" (Japanese: しのびよる毒使い 霧骨)	Masakazu Amiya	Katsuhiko Chiba	Masami Hata	March 10, 2003	June 11, 2005
105	18	"The Ghastly Steel Machine!"; Transliteration: "Bukimi na Hagane no Jūsōbi" (Japanese: 不気味な鋼の重装備)	Teruo Sato	Akatsuki Yamatoya	Tatsuya Ishihara	March 17, 2003	June 18, 2005
106	19	"Kagome, Miroku, and Sango: Desperate Situation!"; Transliteration: "Kagome, Miroku, Sango, Zettai Zetsumei" (Japanese: かごめ、弥勒、珊瑚、絶体絶命)	Megumi Yamamoto	Junki Takegami	Megumi Yamamoto	April 14, 2003	June 25, 2005
107	20	"Inuyasha Shows His Tears For The First Time"; Transliteration: "Hajimete Miseru Inuyasha no Namida" (Japanese: 初めてみせる犬夜叉の涙)	Kiyoshi Fukumoto	Katsuyuki Sumisawa	Kiyoshi Fukumoto	April 21, 2003	July 2, 2005
108	21	"The Secret of the Pure Light"; Transliteration: "Kegarenaki Hikari no Himitsu" (Japanese: けがれなき光の秘密)	Tatsuya Ishihara	Katsuyuki Sumisawa	Masami Hata	April 28, 2003	July 9, 2005
109	22	"Hidden in the Mist: Onward to Mt. Hakurei!"; Transliteration: "Kiri ni Kakureta Hakureizan e Mukae" (Japanese: 霧に隠れた白霊山へ向かえ)	Satoshi Toba	Akatsuki Yamatoya	Mitsuko Kase	May 5, 2003	July 16, 2005
110	23	"Enter Bankotsu, The Leader of the Band of Seven"; Transliteration: "Shichinintai no Shuryō, Bankotsu Tōjō" (Japanese: 七人隊の首領 蛮骨登場)	Masakazu Amiya	Katsuhiko Chiba	Kiyoshi Fukumoto	May 12, 2003	July 23, 2005
111	24	"The Big Clash: Banryu versus the Wind Scar"; Transliteration: "Gekitotsu! Banryū vs Kaze no Kizu!" (Japanese: 激突! 蛮竜VS風の傷!)	Teruo Sato	Katsuhiko Chiba	Yukio Nishimoto	May 19, 2003	July 30, 2005
112	25	"Afloat on the Lake Surface: The Barrier of Hijiri Island"; Transliteration: "Komen ni Ukabu Hijiri Jima Kekkai" (Japanese: 湖面に浮かぶ聖島の結界)	Megumi Yamamoto	Junki Takegami	Megumi Yamamoto	May 26, 2003	August 6, 2005
113	26	"The Sacred Vajra and the Mystery of the Living Buddha"; Transliteration: "Seinaru Dokko to Sokushinbutsu no Nazo" (Japanese: 聖なる独鈷と即身仏の謎)	Tatsuya Ishihara	Tetsuko Takahashi	Tatsuya Ishihara	June 2, 2003	August 13, 2005
114	27	"Koga's Solitary Battle"; Transliteration: "Kōga no Kokō Naru Tatakai" (Japanese: 鋼牙の孤高なる戦い)	Satoshi Toba	Akatsuki Yamatoya	Mitsuko Kase	June 9, 2003	August 20, 2005
115	28	"Lured by the Black Light"; Transliteration: "Suikomareru Kuroi Hikari" (Japanese: 吸い込まれる黒い光)	Hirofumi Ogura	Katsuyuki Sumisawa	Kiyoshi Fukumoto	June 16, 2003	August 27, 2005
116	29	"The Exposed Face of Truth"; Transliteration: "Sarakedasareta Shinjitsu no Kao" (Japanese: さらけだされた真実の顔)	Masakazu Amiya	Katsuyuki Sumisawa	Susumu Nishizawa	June 23, 2003	September 3, 2005
117	30	"Vanished in a River of Flames"; Transliteration: "Honō no Kawa ni Kieta Aitsu" (Japanese: 炎の川に消えたアイツ)	Teruo Sato	Katsuhiko Chiba	Mitsuko Kase	June 30, 2003	September 10, 2005
118	31	"Into the Depths of Mt. Hakurei"; Transliteration: "Hakureizan no Oku no Oku" (Japanese: 白霊山の奥の奥)	Tatsuya Ishihara	Akatsuki Yamatoya	Tatsuya Ishihara	July 7, 2003	September 17, 2005
119	32	"Divine Malice of the Saint"; Transliteration: "Kōgōshii Akui no Seija" (Japanese: 神々しい悪意の聖者)	Megumi Yamamoto	Junki Takegami	Megumi Yamamoto	July 14, 2003	September 24, 2005
120	33	"Fare Thee Well: Jakotsu's Requiem"; Transliteration: "Sayonara Jakotsu no Chinkonka" (Japanese: さよなら蛇骨の鎮魂歌)	Satoshi Toba	Akatsuki Yamatoya	Masayuki Miyaji	July 28, 2003	October 1, 2005
121	34	"Final Battle: The Last and Strongest of the Band of Seven"; Transliteration: "Kessen! Saikyō Saigo no Shichinintai" (Japanese: 決戦! 最強最後の七人隊)	Hirofumi Ogura	Katsuhiko Chiba	Susumu Nishizawa	August 4, 2003	October 8, 2005
122	35	"The Power of Banryu: Duel to the Death on Mt. Hakurei"; Transliteration: "Kyōretsu Banryū: Hakureizan no Shitō" (Japanese: 強烈蛮竜 白霊山の死闘)	Masakazu Amiya	Katsuhiko Chiba	Toshiya Shinohara	August 11, 2003	October 15, 2005
123	36	"Beyond the Darkness - Naraku Reborn!"; Transliteration: "Kurayami no Saki ni Shinsei Naraku" (Japanese: 暗闇の先に新生奈落)	Tatsuya Ishihara	Katsuyuki Sumisawa	Tatsuya Ishihara	August 18, 2003	October 22, 2005
124	37	"Farewell Kikyo, My Beloved"; Transliteration: "Saraba Itoshiki Kikyō yo" (Japanese: さらば愛しき桔梗よ)	Teruo Sato	Katsuyuki Sumisawa	Mitsuko Kase	August 25, 2003	October 29, 2005
125	38	"The Darkness in Kagome's Heart"; Transliteration: "Kagome no Kokoro no Yami" (Japanese: かごめの心の闇)	Megumi Yamamoto	Tetsuko Takahashi	Megumi Yamamoto	September 1, 2003	November 5, 2005
126	39	"Transform Heartache into Courage!"; Transliteration: "Kokoro no Itami o Yūki ni Kaero" (Japanese: 心の痛みを勇気にかえろ)	Satoshi Toba	Tetsuko Takahashi	Masayuki Miyaji	September 8, 2003	November 12, 2005
127	40	"Don't Boil It! The Terrifying Dried-Up Demon!"; Transliteration: "Nichadame! Kyōfu no Himono Yōkai" (Japanese: 煮ちゃダメ! 恐怖の干物妖怪)	Masakazu Amiya	Katsuhiko Chiba	Susumu Nishizawa	September 15, 2003	January 4, 2006

=== Season 4 (2003–04) ===
No. overall	No. in season	Title	Directed by	Written by	Storyboarded by	Original release date	English air date
128	1	"Battle Against the Dried-Up Demons at the Cultural Festival!"; Transliteration: "Himono Yōkai to Gekitō Bunkasai" (Japanese: 干物妖怪と激闘文化祭)	Tomoe Aratani	Akatsuki Yamatoya	Tomoe Aratani	October 13, 2003	January 11, 2006
129	2	"Chokyukai and the Abducted Bride"; Transliteration: "Chokyukai to Ryakudatsusareta Hanayome" (Japanese: 猪九戒と略奪された花嫁)	Kiyoshi Fukumoto	Junki Takegami	Kiyoshi Fukumoto	October 20, 2003	January 18, 2006
130	3	"Shippo's New Technique, The Heart Scar!"; Transliteration: "Hoero Shippō Ōgi Kokoro no Kizu" (Japanese: 吠えろ七宝奥義 心の傷!)	Teruo Sato	Katsuhiko Chiba	Toshifumi Kawase	October 27, 2003	January 25, 2006
131	4	"Trap of the Cursed Wall Hanging"; Transliteration: "Kannon Kakejiku Noroi no Wana" (Japanese: 観音掛け軸 呪いの罠)	Megumi Yamamoto	Katsuyuki Sumisawa	Megumi Yamamoto	November 3, 2003	February 1, 2006
132	5	"Miroku's Most Dangerous Confession"; Transliteration: "Miroku Hōshi no Mottomo Kiken na Kokuhaku" (Japanese: 弥勒法師の最も危険な告白)	Masakazu Amiya	Katsuyuki Sumisawa	Mitsuko Kase	November 10, 2003	February 8, 2006
133 (Note: Episodes 133 and 134 originally aired together as a one-hour special.)	6	"The Woman Who Loved Sesshomaru, Part 1"; Transliteration: "Sesshōmaru o Aishita Onna, Zenpen" (Japanese: 犬夜叉スペシャル 殺生丸を愛した女)	Satoshi Toba, Teruo Sato	Katsuyuki Sumisawa	Mitsuko Kase, Toshifumi Kawase	November 24, 2003	February 15, 2006
134	7	"The Woman Who Loved Sesshomaru, Part 2"; Transliteration: "Sesshōmaru o Aishita Onna, Kōhen" (Japanese: 犬夜叉スペシャル 殺生丸を愛した女)	Satoshi Toba, Teruo Sato	Katsuyuki Sumisawa	Mitsuko Kase, Toshifumi Kawase	November 24, 2003	February 22, 2006
135	8	"The Last Banquet of Miroku's Master"; Transliteration: "Miroku no Shishō Saigo no Utage" (Japanese: 弥勒の師匠最後の宴)	Tomoe Aratani	Akatsuki Yamatoya	Tomoe Aratani	December 1, 2003	March 1, 2006
136	9	"A Strange Invisible Demon Appears!"; Transliteration: "Kaikitōmei Yōkai Arawaru Arawaru!" (Japanese: 怪奇透明妖怪現る現る!)	Megumi Yamamoto	Katsuhiko Chiba	Megumi Yamamoto	December 8, 2003	March 8, 2006
137	10	"An Ancestor Named Kagome"; Transliteration: "Gosenzo-sama no Namae wa Kagome" (Japanese: ご先祖の名はかごめ)	Kiyoshi Fukumoto	Tetsuko Takahashi	Kiyoshi Fukumoto	January 12, 2004	March 15, 2006
138	11	"Mountain of Demons: Survival of the Duo"; Transliteration: "Yōkai Sanga Futari no Sabaibaru" (Japanese: 妖怪山河ふたりのサバイバル)	Tomoe Aratani	Junki Takegami	Tomoe Aratani	January 19, 2004	March 22, 2006
139	12	"The Great Duel at Shoun Falls!"; Transliteration: "Shōun no Taki no Dai Kettō" (Japanese: 昇雲の滝の大決闘)	Masakazu Amiya	Junki Takegami	Masayuki Miyaji	January 26, 2004	March 29, 2006
140	13	"Eternal Love: The Naginata of Kenkon"; Transliteration: "Eien no Omoi: Kenkon no Naginata" (Japanese: 永遠の思い 乾坤の薙刀)	Satoshi Toba	Katsuyuki Sumisawa	Toshifumi Kawase	February 2, 2004	April 5, 2006
141	14	"Entei, The Demon Horse Unleashed!"; Transliteration: "Tokihanatareta Yōba Entei" (Japanese: 解き放たれた妖馬炎蹄)	Teruo Sato	Akatsuki Yamatoya	Teruo Sato	February 9, 2004	April 12, 2006
142	15	"Untamed Entei and Horrible Hakudoshi"; Transliteration: "Bōsō Entei to Senritsu no Hakudōshi" (Japanese: 暴走炎蹄と戦慄の白童子)	Megumi Yamamoto	Katsuhiko Chiba	Mitsuko Kase, Toshifumi Kawase	February 16, 2004	April 19, 2006
143	16	"3000 Leagues in Search of Father"; Transliteration: "Chichi o Tazunete San Senri" (Japanese: 父を訪ねて三千里)	Tomoe Aratani	Junki Takegami	Tomoe Aratani	February 23, 2004	April 26, 2006
144	17	"Hosenki and the Last Shard"; Transliteration: "Hōsenki to Saigo no Kakera" (Japanese: 宝仙鬼と最後のかけら)	Masakazu Amiya	Katsuyuki Sumisawa	Mitsuko Kase	March 1, 2004	May 3, 2006
145	18	"Bizarre Guards at the Border of the Afterlife"; Transliteration: "Ano Yo to no Sakai ni Iyō na Monban" (Japanese: あの世との境に異様な門番)	Satoshi Toba	Akatsuki Yamatoya	Akira Nishimori	March 8, 2004	May 10, 2006
146	19	"The Fiery Bird Master, Princess Abi"; Transliteration: "Kishōarai Toritsukai, Abi-Hime" (Japanese: 気性荒い鳥使い 阿毘姫)	Tatsuya Ishihara	Katsuhiko Chiba	Tomoe Aratani	March 15, 2004	May 17, 2006
147 (Note: Episodes 147 and 148 originally aired together as a one-hour special.)	20	"The Tragic Love Song of Destiny, Part 1"; Transliteration: "Meguriau Mae no Sadame no Koi Uta, Zenpen" (Japanese: めぐり逢う前の運命恋歌)	Masakazu Amiya, Teruo Sato	Katsuyuki Sumisawa	Mitsuko Kase, Teruo Sato	April 19, 2004	May 24, 2006
148	21	"The Tragic Love Song of Destiny, Part 2"; Transliteration: "Meguriau Mae no Sadame no Koi Uta, Kōhen" (Japanese: めぐり逢う前の運命恋歌)	Masakazu Amiya, Teruo Sato	Katsuyuki Sumisawa	Mitsuko Kase, Teruo Sato	April 19, 2004	May 31, 2006
149	22	"The Single Arrow of Chaos"; Transliteration: "Haran o Yobu Ippon no Ya" (Japanese: 波乱を呼ぶ一本の矢)	Satoshi Toba	Akatsuki Yamatoya	Akira Nishimori	April 26, 2004	June 7, 2006
150	23	"The Mysterious Light that Guides the Saint"; Transliteration: "Seija o Michibiku Fushigi na Hikari" (Japanese: 聖者を導く不思議な光)	Teruo Sato	Junki Takegami	Teruo Sato	May 3, 2004	June 14, 2006
151	24	"Kagome's Instinctive Choice"; Transliteration: "Kagome: Honnō no Sentaku" (Japanese: かごめ 本能の選択)	Megumi Yamamoto	Katsuyuki Sumisawa	Mitsuko Kase	May 10, 2004	June 21, 2006
152	25	"Protect and Plunder!"; Transliteration: "Mamore Soshite Ubaitore!" (Japanese: 守れそして奪い取れ!)	Masakazu Amiya	Katsuhiko Chiba	Tsukasa Sunaga	May 17, 2004	June 28, 2006
153	26	"The Cruel Reunion of Fate"; Transliteration: "Ummei wa Zankoku na Saikai" (Japanese: 運命は残酷な再会)	Tatsuya Ishihara	Katsuhiko Chiba	Tatsuya Ishihara	May 24, 2004	July 5, 2006
154	27	"The Demon Linked with the Netherworld"; Transliteration: "Ano Yo to Tsunagaru Yōkai" (Japanese: あの世とつながる妖怪)	Hirofumi Ogura	Akatsuki Yamatoya	Tsukasa Sunaga	May 31, 2004	July 12, 2006
155	28	"The Demon Protector of the Sacred Jewel Shard!"; Transliteration: "Shikon no Kakera o Mamoru Oni" (Japanese: 四魂のかけらを守る鬼)	Teruo Sato	Junki Takegami	Teruo Sato	June 7, 2004	July 19, 2006
156	29	"Final Battle at the Graveside: Sesshomaru Versus Inuyasha!"; Transliteration: "Bozen Kessen! Sesshōmaru vs InuYasha" (Japanese: 墓前決戦! 殺生丸VS犬夜叉)	Satoshi Toba	Katsuyuki Sumisawa	Mitsuko Kase	June 14, 2004	July 26, 2006
157	30	"Destroy Naraku with the Adamant Barrage!"; Transliteration: "Naraku o Tsuranuke Kongōsōha" (Japanese: 奈落を貫け金剛槍破)	Masakazu Amiya	Akatsuki Yamatoya	Toshifumi Kawase	June 21, 2004	August 2, 2006
158	31	"Stampede of the Countless Demon Rats!"; Transliteration: "Daibōsō Musū no Yōkai Nezumi" (Japanese: 大暴走無数の妖怪ネズミ)	Tatsuya Ishihara	Katsuhiko Chiba	Tatsuya Ishihara	July 5, 2004	October 12, 2006
159	32	"Kohaku's Decision and Sango's Heart"; Transliteration: "Kohaku no Ketsui to Sango no Kokoro" (Japanese: 琥珀の決意と珊瑚の心)	Satoshi Toba	Katsuhiko Chiba	Akira Nishimori	July 12, 2004	October 13, 2006
160	33	"The Lucky but Two-Timing Scoundrel!"; Transliteration: "Shiawase o Yobu Futamata Bōryoku Otoko" (Japanese: 幸せを呼ぶフタマタ暴力男)	Teruo Sato	Tetsuko Takahashi	Tsukasa Sunaga	July 26, 2004	October 17, 2006
161	34	"Miroku's Past Mistake"; Transliteration: "Miroku-hōshi Mukashi no Ayamachi" (Japanese: 弥勒法師昔のあやまち)	Masakazu Amiya	Akatsuki Yamatoya	Mitsuko Kase	August 2, 2004	October 18, 2006
162	35	"Forever with Lord Sesshomaru"; Transliteration: "Sesshōmaru-sama to Eien ni Issho" (Japanese: 殺生丸様と永遠に一緒)	Hirofumi Ogura	Katsuhiko Chiba	Akira Nishimori	August 9, 2004	October 19, 2006
163	36	"Kohaku, Sango and Kirara: The Secret Flower Garden"; Transliteration: "Kohaku Sango Kirara: Himitsu no Hanazono" (Japanese: 琥珀珊瑚雲母 秘密の花園)	Tatsuya Ishihara	Akatsuki Yamatoya	Tatsuya Ishihara	August 23, 2004	October 20, 2006
164	37	"Possessed by a Parasite: Shippo, Our Worst Enemy"; Transliteration: "Saikyō no Teki: Yadori Sanagi Shippō" (Japanese: 最強の敵 宿り蛹七宝)	Megumi Yamamoto	Junki Takegami	Megumi Yamamoto	August 30, 2004	October 24, 2006
165	38	"The Ultimate Key to Defeating Naraku"; Transliteration: "Naraku o Taosu Saidai no Tegakari" (Japanese: 奈落を倒す最大の手がかり)	Satoshi Toba	Katsuhiko Chiba	Susumu Nishizawa	September 6, 2004	October 25, 2006
166 (Note: Episodes 166 and 167 originally aired together as a one-hour special.)	39	"The Bond Between Them, Use the Sacred Jewel Shard! Part 1"; Transliteration: "Futari no Kizuna - Shikon no Kakera o Tsukae! Zenpen" (Japanese: 二人の絆 四魂のかけらを使え! 前編)	Teruo Sato	Katsuyuki Sumisawa	Mitsuko Kase, Teruo Sato, Yasunao Aoki	September 13, 2004	October 26, 2006
167	40	"The Bond Between Them, Use the Sacred Jewel Shard! Part 2"; Transliteration: "Futari no Kizuna - Shikon no Kakera o Tsukae! Kōhen" (Japanese: 二人の絆 四魂のかけらを使え! 後編)	Teruo Sato	Katsuyuki Sumisawa	Mitsuko Kase, Teruo Sato, Yasunao Aoki	September 13, 2004	October 27, 2006

=== The Final Act (2009–10) ===
No. overall	No. in series	Title	Directed by	Storyboarded by	Original release date	English air date
168	1	"Naraku's Heart"; Transliteration: "Naraku no Shinzō" (Japanese: 奈落の心臓)	Shinya Watada	Yasunao Aoki	October 4, 2009	October 2, 2012
169	2	"Kagura's Wind"; Transliteration: "Kagura no Kaze" (Japanese: 神楽の風)	Satoshi Toba	Yasunao Aoki	October 11, 2009	October 12, 2012
170	3	"Meido Zangetsuha"; Transliteration: "Meidō Zangetsuha" (Japanese: 冥道残月破)	Takahiko Kyōgoku	Hitoyuki Matsui	October 18, 2009	October 19, 2012
171	4	"The Dragon-Scaled Tetsusaiga"; Transliteration: "Ryūrin no Tessaiga" (Japanese: 竜鱗の鉄砕牙)	Yasuo Iwamoto	Yasunao Aoki	October 25, 2009	October 26, 2012
172	5	"The Great Holy Demon Spirit's Test"; Transliteration: "Yōrei Taisei no Shiren" (Japanese: 妖霊大聖の試練)	Takeshi Furuta	Kenji Kodama	November 1, 2009	November 2, 2012
173	6	"The End of Moryomaru"; Transliteration: "Mōryōmaru no Saigo" (Japanese: 魍魎丸の最期)	Atsushi Yano	Hitoyuki Matsui	November 8, 2009	November 9, 2012
174	7	"The Mausoleum of Mount Azusa"; Transliteration: "Azusayama no Reibyō" (Japanese: 梓山の霊廟)	Shinya Watada	Shinya Watada	November 15, 2009	November 16, 2012
175	8	"Among the Twinkling Stars"; Transliteration: "Hoshiboshi Kirameki no Aida ni" (Japanese: 星々きらめきの間に)	Satoshi Toba	Atsuo Tobe	November 22, 2009	November 23, 2012
176	9	"Sesshomaru in the Underworld"; Transliteration: "Meikai no Sesshōmaru" (Japanese: 冥界の殺生丸)	Takeshi Furuta	Kenji Kodama	November 29, 2009	November 30, 2012
177	10	"Flowers Drenched in Sadness"; Transliteration: "Kanashimi ni Nureru Hana" (Japanese: 悲しみに濡れる花)	Noriaki Saito	Masato Sato	December 6, 2009	December 7, 2012
178	11	"Kanna's Gravestone"; Transliteration: "Kanna no Bohyō" (Japanese: 神無の墓標)	Takahiko Kyōgoku	Kenji Kodama	December 13, 2009	December 14, 2012
179	12	"Sango's Feelings, Miroku's Resolve"; Transliteration: "Sango no Omoi, Miroku no Kakugo" (Japanese: 珊瑚の想い 弥勒の覚悟)	Atsushi Yano	Masashi Kojima	December 20, 2009	December 21, 2012
180	13	"A Complete Meido"; Transliteration: "Kanzen na Meidō" (Japanese: 完全な冥道)	Satoshi Toba	Mitsuko Kase	December 27, 2009	December 28, 2012
181	14	"In Pursuit of Naraku"; Transliteration: "Naraku no Tsuigeki" (Japanese: 奈落の追撃)	Takeshi Furuta	Masato Sato	January 5, 2010	January 4, 2013
182	15	"True Heir"; Transliteration: "Seitōnaru Keishōsha" (Japanese: 正統なる継承者)	Shinya Watada	Yasunao Aoki	January 12, 2010	January 11, 2013
183	16	"Hitomiko's Barrier"; Transliteration: "Hitomiko no kekkai" (Japanese: 瞳子の結界)	Noriaki Akitaya	Kenji Kodama	January 19, 2010	January 18, 2013
184	17	"Magatsuhi's Evil Will"; Transliteration: "Magatsuhi no Janen" (Japanese: 曲霊の邪念)	Satoshi Toba	Hitoyuki Matsui	January 26, 2010	January 25, 2013
185	18	"The Day of Days"; Transliteration: "Jinsei no Ichidaiji" (Japanese: 人生の一大事)	Takahiko Kyōgoku	Takahiko Kyōgoku	February 2, 2010	February 1, 2013
186	19	"Kohaku's Shard"; Transliteration: "Kōhaku no Kakera" (Japanese: 琥珀の欠片)	Atsushi Yano, Hiroki Negishi	Masashi Kojima	February 9, 2010	February 8, 2013
187	20	"When the Jewel Is Whole"; Transliteration: "Shikon no Tama ga Kansei suru Toki" (Japanese: 四魂の玉が完成する時)	Takeshi Furuta	Kenji Kodama	February 16, 2010	February 15, 2013
188	21	"Inside Naraku"; Transliteration: "Naraku no Tainai e" (Japanese: 奈落の体内へ)	Satoshi Toba	Mitsuko Kase	February 23, 2010	February 22, 2013
189	22	"Naraku: The Trap of Darkness"; Transliteration: "Naraku: Yami no Wana" (Japanese: 奈落 闇の罠)	Teruo Sato	Masato Sato	March 2, 2010	March 1, 2013
190	23	"Naraku: The Trap of Light"; Transliteration: "Naraku: Hikari no Wana" (Japanese: 奈落 光の罠)	Satoshi Toba	Kenji Kodama	March 9, 2010	March 8, 2013
191	24	"Naraku's Uncertain Wish"; Transliteration: "Naraku: Hakanaki Nozomi" (Japanese: 奈落 儚き望み)	Takeshi Furuta	Hitoyuki Matsui	March 16, 2010	March 15, 2013
192	25	"Thoughts Fall Short"; Transliteration: "Todokanu Omoi" (Japanese: 届かぬ想い)	Takahiko Kyōgoku	Mitsuko Kase	March 23, 2010	March 22, 2013
193	26	"Toward Tomorrow"; Transliteration: "Ashita e" (Japanese: 明日へ)	Teruo Sato	Yasunao Aoki	March 30, 2010	March 29, 2013

== Home media ==
=== DVD releases ===
On April 16, 2007, the first twelve Inuyasha episodes were released on DVD in the United Kingdom. In the United States, all of the seasons have been released as individual discs and, as of April 2009, season box sets.

Viz Media (Region 1)
Season	Episodes	Discs	Features	DVD release date
1	1–27	5	Japanese and English audio options; English subtitles	September 7, 2004; November 13, 2012 (re-release)
2	28–54	5	Japanese and English audio options; English subtitles	November 8, 2005; January 29, 2013 (re-release)
3	55–81	5	Japanese and English audio options; English subtitles	September 12, 2006; January 29, 2013 (re-release)
4	82–99	4	Japanese and English audio options; English subtitles	September 4, 2007; January 29, 2013 (re-release)
5	100–126	5	Japanese and English audio options; English subtitles	July 29, 2008; January 29, 2013 (re-release)
6	127–146	4	Japanese and English audio options; English subtitles	December 2, 2008; January 29, 2013 (re-release)
7	147–167	4	Japanese and English audio options; English subtitles	April 28, 2009; January 29, 2013 (re-release)

Fabulous Films/FremantleMedia Home Entertainment (Region 2)
Season	Episodes	Discs	Features	DVD release date
1a	1–12	2	Japanese and English audio options; English subtitles	April 16, 2007

=== Blu-ray releases ===
Viz Media (Region A)
Name	Date	Discs	Episodes
Set 1	July 14, 2020	4	1–27
Set 2	August 11, 2020	4	28–55
Set 3	November 10, 2020	4	56–83
Set 4	March 2, 2021	4	84–111
Set 5	May 18, 2021	4	112–139
Set 6	August 10, 2021	4	140–167

== Music listing ==
Fourteen pieces of theme music were used for the original series; six opening themes and eight ending themes.

Opening themes
Title	Artist	First Episode	Last Episode
"Change the World"	V6	1	34
"I Am"	hitomi	35	64
"Owarinai Yume" (終わりない夢, Unending Dream)	Nanase Aikawa	65	95
"Grip!"	Every Little Thing	96	127
"One Day, One Dream"	Tackey & Tsubasa	128	153
"Angelus"	Hitomi Shimatani	154	167

Closing themes
Title	Artist	First Episode	Last Episode
"My Will"	Dream	1	20, 166–167 (one-hour special episode)
"Fukai Mori"	Do As Infinity	21	41
"Dearest"	Ayumi Hamasaki	42	60
"Every Heart (Minna no Kimochi)"	BoA	61	85
"Shinjitsu no Uta (Song of Truth)"	Do As Infinity	86	108
"Itazura na Kiss" (イタズラなKISS, Mischievous Kiss)	Day After Tomorrow	109	127
"Come"	Namie Amuro	128	146
"Change the World"	V6		147–148 (one-hour special episode)
"Brand-New World"	V6	149	165
