= Hard Luck Hero =

- Directed by: Sabu
- Written by: Sabu
- Produced by: Tarō Nagamatsuya; Satoru Ogura; Arishige Shimomura; Masahiko Tan; Koji Yoshizawa
- Starring: Sakamoto Masayuki; Nagano Hiroshi; Inohara Yoshihiko; Morita Go; Miyake Ken; Okada Junichi
- Cinematography: Masao Nakabori
- Edited by: Nobuyuki Ito
- Music by: Yasuhisa Murase
- Distributed by: Avex Inc.
- Release date: November 27, 2003
- Running time: 79 minutes
- Country: Japan
- Language: Japanese

Hard Luck Hero (ハードラックヒーロー) is a 2003 Japanese film written and directed by Japanese film director Sabu to showcase the Japanese boy band V6. The film involves usual Sabu elements such as high-speed car chases and yakuza.

== Plot ==
The story follows three pairs of characters, all of whom are fleeing an illegal Thai boxing match.

The first characters shown are two restaurant workers. One persuades the other to take part in the boxing match, in place of an absent boxer. Although the bout was rigged to end in his defeat in the second round, he knocks his opponent out within seconds of the start. The pair are soon involved in a high-speech car chase with angered members of the yakuza.

The second pair of characters are two young businessmen who choose to eat at the restaurant where the boxing match is takes place, unaware of its yakuza connections. They flee the after a police raid and are involved in a high-speed car-chase with a patrol car.

The third pair of characters are in need of money to pay for damage they caused to a yakuza's expensive car. They attend the bout to steal the takings but one of them is shot and his friend drives him around in search of a hospital.

The three cars containing the six main characters crash and the postscript shows them sometime later, apparently enjoying successful lives.

== Cast ==
Info: IMDb

- Masayuki Sakamoto as Tadashi Ikeyama
- Hiroshi Nagano as Kenta Kishimoto
- Yoshihiko Inohara as Naoto Ishii
- Gô Morita as Kenji Fujita
- Ken Miyake as Yuji Fujita
- Junichi Okada as Takashi Asai
- Naomi Nishida as Sachiko Kinoshita
- Keisuke Horibe as Shinkichi Inaba
- Shihô Harumi as Referee
- Mickey Koga as Tiger Ishikura
- Masakatsu Funaki as Chef
- Arata Furuta as Yuji Wada
- Susumu Terajima as Shingo Shibata
- Sansei Shiomi as Tetsuo Mishima
