= Boku no Ikiru Michi =

- Genre: Drama
- Starring: Tsuyoshi Kusanagi; Akiko Yada; Haruka Ayase; Hiroki Uchi
- Country of origin: Japan
- Original language: Japanese
- No. of episodes: 11

Original release
- Network: Fuji TV
- Release: January 7 – March 18, 2003

My Way of Life (Boku no Ikiru Michi (僕の生きる道)) is a 2003 Japanese drama television series.

== Synopsis ==
High school teacher Hideo is diagnosed with stomach cancer and learns he has only one year to live.

== Cast and characters ==
- Tsuyoshi Kusanagi as Nakamura Hideo
- Akiko Yada as Nakamura (Akimoto) Midori
- Ren Osugi as Takayuki Akimoto
- Fumiyo Kohinata as Benzo Kaneda
- Shōsuke Tanihara as Kubo Masaru
- Aiko Morishita as Ota Reiko
- Jun Toba as Okuda Chikara
- Kinya Kikuchi as Akai Sadao
- Kazuyuki Asano as Furuta Shinsuke
- Haruka Ayase as Megumi Sugita
- Hayato Ichihara as Masato Taoka
- Hiroki Uchi as Hitoshi Yoshida
- Reina Asami as Rina Suzuki
- Natsuhi Ueno as Akasaka Shiori
- Hazuki Suzuki as Moe Kondo
- Anri Iwasaki as Aika Kuroki
- Uchuu Fujima as Mamoru Tanaka

== Awards and nominations ==
Year	Award	Category	Nominee	Result	Ref.
2003	6th Nikkan Sports Drama Grand Prix	Best Supporting Actress	Akiko Yada	Won	
2003	6th Nikkan Sports Drama Grand Prix	Newcomer Award	Hiroki Uchi	Won	
