= Risa Junna =

- 純名里沙
- Born: Junko Nakanishi (中西純子); March 15, 1971 (age 55); Minoh, Osaka, Japan
- Occupations: Actress; singer; voice actress
- Years active: 1990–present
- Musical career
- Origin: Toyonaka, Osaka, Japan
- Genres: J-pop; Crossover
- Instrument: Vocals
- Labels: Columbia; Pony Canyon; Media Remoras; Geneon; BMG Japan; Victor
- Website: risajunna.com

Risa Junna (純名りさ, Junna Risa; born March 15, 1971) is a Japanese actress, singer, and voice actress. She was part of Takarazuka Revue's Snow Troupe and Flower Troupe. During her time in the Revue, she specialized in female roles (musumeyaku). She was the musumeyaku top star from 1995 to 1996.

== Career ==
Junna was born on March 15, 1971, in Minoh, Osaka, and grew up in the nearby Toyonaka. Her parents were both junior high school teachers. Her father taught English and her mother taught physical education.

In March 1988, she passed the audition for Takarazuka Music School and subsequently entered the school. She trained for two years and graduated at the top of her class. She joined the Takarazuka Revue in 1990. Her first stage was in Flower Troupe's The Rose of Versailles: Fersen. Due to her singing ability, she was chosen to be the etoile (the singer in the last scene). From then on she was part of the Snow Troupe.

In 1994, following encouragement from the troupe, she auditioned and was chosen to star in NHK's 51st asadora Piano. She took one year off from the revue for the drama. After returning in 1995, she transferred to the Flower Troupe. She made her top musumeyaku debut that same year, starring alongside Miki Maya in East of Eden/Dandyism! Her final stage was How to Succeed in 1996. Since her retirement, she has had success as an actress in television, film, and commercials.

In 2001, she starred alongside Anita Mui and Simon Yam in the 2001 Hong Kong film Midnight Fly. She also sang its theme song. The film was nominated for nine Golden Horse Awards (including Best Supporting Actress and Best Original Film Song for Junna) and won one for Best Original Film Song.

== Stage ==
Takarazuka Revue
Year	Title	Role	Notes	Theatre
1990	The Rose of Versailles: Fersen		Flower Troupe, etoile	Takarazuka Grand Theater
1990–1991	The Apollon Mystery/Jesus Diamante	Newspaper seller/Liza (shinjin kōen)	Star Troupe, Two performances as Liza	Takarazuka Grand Theater
Snow Troupe
1991	Kagenshou/Sweet Typhoon	Girl (shinjin kōen)	Two performances as Girl	Takarazuka Grand Theater
1991–1992	The Land of Smiles	Lisa	Lead role	Takarazuka Bow Hall
1991–1992	The Great Gatsby/Lovers’ Concerto	Judy/Daisy Buchanan (shinjin kōen)	Two performances as Daisy Buchanan (musumeyaku lead), etoile	Takarazuka Grand Theater
1992	Kono Koi wa Kumo no Hate Made	Setona	Etoile	Takarazuka Grand Theater
1992–1993	Valentino	Alice		Takarazuka Bow Hall
1992–1993	Chuushingura (Hana ni Chiri Yuki ni Chiri)	Okiku/Aguri/Oran (shinjin kōen)	Two performances as Aguri/Oran (musumeyaku lead)	Takarazuka Grand Theater
1992	Jump For Joy	Maria		Theater Drama City
1993	Heaven and Hell/Take Off	Jean/Hortense/Amanda/Hérminie (shinjin kōen)	Two performances as Amanda/Hérminie (musumeyaku lead)	Takarazuka Grand Theater
1993–1994	Bourbon no Fūin/La Côte d’Azur	Henriette/Liza	Etoile	Takarazuka Grand Theater
Flower Troupe
1995	Kanashimi no Córdoba/Mega Vision	Anfelita Navarro	Etoile	Takarazuka Grand Theater
1995	Last Dance	Claudia		Takarazuka Bow Hall
1995	East of Eden/Dandyism!	Abra Bacon	Musumeyaku lead	Takarazuka Grand Theater
1995	Beni wa Kobe/Mega Vision	Marguerite Blakeney	Musumeyaku lead	National Tour
1996	Hana wa Hana Nari/Hyperion	Kasumi	Musumeyaku lead	Takarazuka, Tokyo
1996	How to Succeed	Rosemary Pilkington	Musumeyaku lead	Takarazuka, Tokyo

Post-Takarazuka
Year	Title	Role	Theatre
1997–1999	Les Misérables	Cosette	Imperial Theatre
1999	Chikyu Gorgeous Vol 3: Chizu ni Nai Machi	Izumi Sunahara	The Galaxy Theatre, Theater Drama City
2000	The Makioka Sisters	Taeko	Imperial Theatre
2000	Chikyu Gorgeous Vol 4: Sakura no Uta	Tomiko Azuma	Bunkamura Theatre Cocoon, Theater Drama City
2001	Christmas Box	Kelly	Aoyama Theatre
2002	Love Letters	Melissa Gardner	Parco Theater
2003	The Angels with Closed Eyes		Le Theatre Ginza
2003	Saturday Night Fever: The Musical	Stephanie Mangano	Shinjuku Koma Theater
2004–2005	Nine The Musical	Claudia	Theater Brava!, The Galaxy Theatre
2006	Nobunaga	Nōhime	Shinbashi Enbujō, Osaka Shochikuza Theatre
2006	Me and My Girl	Jacqueline Carstone	Imperial Theatre
2007	Blue Stockings no Onna-tachi	Noe Itō	Kinokuniya Hall
2007	LOVE 30 (Kitamuki no Onna)	Misako	Parco Theater
2007	Misuzu to Teru to Haha-sama to	Teru Kaneko/Misuzu Kaneko	Suntory Hall
2007	Ijin no uta: Antigone	Mei	New National Theatre Tokyo
2009	Reijō to Meshitsukai		Akasaka Red Theater

== Filmography ==
Film
Year	Title	Role	Notes/Ref.
1999	Ultraman Gaia: The Battle in Hyperspace	Teacher	
2001	Shokoki!	Yumi Yamada	Lead role
2001	Midnight Fly	Miki	Golden Horse Award for Best Original Film Song; Nomination, Golden Horse Award for Best Supporting Actress
2003	Ashita o Tsukutta Otoko	Unknown	Voice role
2006	Pet Box: Ichioku no Neko	Unknown	
2009	Hanamuko wa 18-Sai	Aiko Hatsuki	

Television
Year	Title	Role	Notes/Ref.
1994	Piano	Piano Sakurai	Lead role, asadora
1997	Love Generation	Sanae Mizuhara	
1998	Love Generation '98	Sanae Mizuhara	Television special
1998	Hitoribocchi no Kimi ni	Azusa Shiraishi	
1998	Seikimatsu no Uta	Rumi Sasaki	Episode: "Kurumaisu no Koi"
1999	Rasen	Miwako Andō	
2000	Aijin no Okite	Yuka Takagi	
2001	Akui	Hidaka Hatsumi	
2002	Joshi-ana Keiji Kareinaru Zaihō Satsujin	Tamae Hirose	Television special
2002	Okashina Futari 2	Maki Koga	Television special
2002	24th NHK Kayō Charity Concert	Host	Music program
2002	Kuro no Honryū	Yuko Okabashi	Television special
2002	Aibō	Reiko Iwasaki	Season 1, episode 1
2002	Ally McBeal	Jenny Shaw	Voice role, 13 episodes
2003	Kasai Chōsakan Kurenai Renjirō	Eiko Mayumura	Television special
2003	Koi no Etude	Unknown	Episode: "Storm"
2003	Chūshingura	Okaru	Television special
2003	Kōgen e Irasshai	Karu	
2003	Astro Boy	Erika Nishino	Voice role, Episode: "Robot Boy"
2003	Yosomono	Mayumi Fujiyama	Television special
2004	Sekai de Ichiban Nagai 24-jikan	Nao	Television special
2005	Ruri no Shima	Takako Nakama	2 episodes
2005	Kuidōraku! Shutchō Ryōrijin	Shōko Yoshioka	Television special
2006	Yaoh	Tamaki	Episode 9
2007	NHK Kansai Special Feature	Herself	Television special
2007	Shokatsudeka 3	Aya Hozumi	Television special
2007	Zou no Hanako	Sayoko Takano	Television special
2007	Manhattan Diaries	Mikiko Koido	
2008	Seikatsu Hot Morning	Herself	Television special
2008	Little Charo: Karada ni Shimikomu Eikaiwa	Herself (guest)	Episode 1
2008–2009	Little Charo	Charo	Voice role, 50 episodes
2008	37th NHK Kayō Charity Concert	Herself	Television special
2008	Mito Kōmon	Yū Takaoda	Season 39, episode 1
2009	Risa Junna Yūkyū no Taiga 800km no Tabi	Herself	Documentary
2009	Okan no Gyakushū	Aiko Tanaka	Lead role, television special
2009	Keiji no Genba 2	Unknown	Episode 4
2009	Kareinaru Spy	Naomi Lee	Episode: Mission 6
2010–2011	Little Charo 2	Charo	Voice role, 50 episodes
2010	Natsuko to Tensai Sagishi-tachi	Kiwa Takasugi	
2011	Kyūkyū Kyūmei-shi 8	Azusa Kataoka	Television special
2012	Yume Kikō Minamisatsuma	Herself	Documentary
2012	Little Charo: Tōhoku-hen	Charo	Voice role, 12 episodes
2013	Little Charo 4: Eigo de Aruku New York	Charo	Voice role, 36 episodes
2014	Hana wa Saku: Tōhoku ni Saku	Charo	Voice role

Radio
Year	Title	Role	Channel
2010–present	Arigatō Sensei! Another Story	Narrator	Tokyo FM
2011	Seishun Adventure: Kosode Nikki	Kyoko (Murasaki Shikibu)	NHK FM Broadcast
2011	Survivors Guilt: Watashi no Inai Machi de	Mirai Tabata	NHK FM Broadcast
2018	Seishun Adventure: Toki Suna no Ō	Himiko	NHK FM Broadcast

Video games
Year	Title	Role
2011	Little Charo Travels in English!	Charo

== Discography ==
=== Albums ===
1. [1995.09.21] Propose
2. [2007.08.22] Misty Moon
3. [2015.10.21] Silent Love (Anata o Omou 12 no Uta)

=== Singles ===
1. [1994.08.21] "Pīka Pika"
2. [1995.09.06] "Propose"
