= Ring: The Final Chapter =

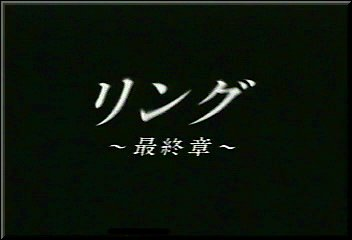
- Title card
- Screenplay by: Kouji Makita; Naoya Takayama
- Directed by: Fukumoto Yoshito; Hidetomo Matsuda; Yoshihito Fukumoto
- Starring: Toshirō Yanagiba; Tomoya Nagase; Akiko Yada; Kotomi Kyono; Tae Kimura
- Composer: Toshiyuki Watanabe
- Country of origin: Japan
- Original language: Japanese
- No. of seasons: 1
- No. of episodes: 12

Production
- Producers: Kenji Shimizu; Sousuke Osabe
- Running time: 45 minutes

Original release
- Network: Fuji TV
- Release: January 7 – March 25, 1999

Ring: The Final Chapter (リング ～最終章～, Ring ~Saishūshō~) is a television series, produced in Japan, based on the Ring film series. There are a total of 12 episodes in the series and a sequel was made called Rasen, consisting of 13 episodes.

== Production ==
After the success of the film adaptation of Ring, the television series takes liberties to change the story. For example, at the end of the first episode, Asakawa has arrived at a cabin in Japan's countryside, to find a tape that had previously doomed three other people. On placing the tape into the video player, he is greeted unexpectedly with a music video by pop idol Nao Matsuzaki.

The series was first shown on January 7, 1999 on Fuji TV and ended March 25. It was followed by a sequel TV series titled Spiral, which ran for 13 50-minute episodes. It features Akiko Yada and Tae Kimura reprising their roles, respectively.

== Cast ==
- Toshirō Yanagiba as Kazuyuki Asakawa
- Tomoya Nagase as Ryûji Takayama
- Kotomi Kyono as Akiko Yoshino
- Akiko Yada as Mai Takano
- Tae Kimura as Sadako Yamamura
- Yūta Fukagawa as Yôichi Asakawa
- Hitomi Kuroki as Rieko Miyashita

== List of episodes ==
1. "The Seal is Now Solved" - January 7, 1999
2. "Killed by a Videotape" - January 14, 1999
3. "Someone is Watching..." - January 21, 1999
4. "A Virus of Silence" - January 28, 1999
5. "The Dead Person Who Was Reborn" - February 4, 1999
6. "A New Person with Supernatural Power" - February 11, 1999
7. "Sadako Will Appear Tonight" - February 18, 1999
8. "Someone Will Die When the Curse is Solved" - February 25, 1999
9. "Planned Memory" - March 3, 1999
10. "Sadako's Revival" - March 11, 1999
11. "Ryuji Takayama Dies" - March 18, 1999
12. "The Curse Was Not Lifted. The Thirteenth Day, a New Dead Person Destroys the World" - March 25, 1999
