= Ultraman Tiga =

Japanese TV drama

- Original Japanese title card
- Genre: Superhero; Tokusatsu; Kaiju; Sci-Fi; Kyodai Hero
- Created by: Tsuburaya Productions
- Developed by: Masakazu Migita
- Directed by: Shingo Matsubara
- Starring: Hiroshi Nagano; Takami Yoshimoto; Akitoshi Ohtaki; Shigeki Kagemaru; Yukio Masuda; Yoichi Furuya; Mio Takaki
- Narrated by: Issei Futamata
- Opening theme: Take Me Higher by V6; Larger Than Life
- Ending theme: Brave Love, Tiga by 地球防衛団 (the Earth Defense Force)
- Composer: Tatsumi Yano
- Country of origin: Japan
- Original language: Japanese
- No. of episodes: 52

Production
- Running time: 30 minutes
- Production companies: Tsuburaya Productions; Mainichi Broadcasting System

Original release
- Network: JNN (MBS, TBS)
- Release: September 7, 1996 – August 30, 1997

Related
- Ultraman 80; Ultraman Dyna

Ultraman Tiga (ウルトラマンティガ, Urutoraman Tiga) is a Japanese tokusatsu TV drama and the eighth entry (twelfth overall) in the Ultra Series, Produced by Tsuburaya Productions and Mainichi Broadcasting System and commemorates the 30th anniversary of the franchise, Ultraman Tiga had aired at 6:00 pm and aired from September 7, 1996, to August 30, 1997, with a total of 52 episodes with five movies (three being crossovers, two being direct sequels to the series as well as a comic book series).

It was broadcast after a franchise hiatus of over 15 years, set in a universe different from all previous series and updated with a new look and feel. Tiga is the first Ultraman with multiple combat modes and non-red colors. It is one of the most popular entries in the Ultra Series. Because of Tiga's popularity, he had more exposure on TV and movies than any other Heisei Ultraman. Ultraman Tiga was also dubbed in English by 4Kids Entertainment and broadcast in the United States as part of the FoxBox programming block on Fox Broadcasting Company affiliates, making it the fourth Ultra Series to air in the United States after Ultraman, Ultra Seven and Ultraman: Towards the Future. A modern retelling of the drama titled Ultraman Trigger: New Generation Tiga was released on July 10, 2021, as a commemoration for the drama's 25th anniversary.

== Plot ==
Set in an alternate universe from the year 2007 until 2010 (2049 in the U.S. dub), giant monsters and evil aliens start to appear, as was foretold by an apocalyptic prophecy about uncontrollable chaos gripping the Earth. Standing against this new threat, the TPC (Terrestrial Peaceable Consortium) is created along with its branch, GUTS (Global Unlimited Task Squad). Through a holographic message in a capsule found by researchers, the GUTS learns about a golden pyramid built by an ancient human civilization. At the site, three statues of a race of giants who defended early human civilization on Earth about 30,000,000 years ago have been unearthed. GUTS finds the three ancient statues, but two of them are destroyed by the monsters Golza and Melba. The third one gains life from the spiritual energy of officer Daigo, a descendant of the ancient race. Daigo and the remaining statue merge into a single being, made of light. Shortly after defeating the two monsters, Daigo is revealed by the hologram of the prophecy that 30 million years in the past, a great evil that not even the giants could stop, destroyed the ancient civilization. Ultraman Tiga is a hero who protects the Earth. He accompanied the children throughout their childhood.

In the series finale, Gatanothor, the Ruler of Darkness, is revealed as the being who destroyed the ancient civilisation, following Tiga's battles against his servants, Gijera and Zoiger. Gatanothor defeats Ultraman Tiga with ease, withstanding the Delacium Light Stream and a modified version of the Zeperion Ray, then petrifies Tiga into a stone statue, but the light of humanity turns him into Glitter Tiga, giving him the power to defeat Gatanothor and save the Earth. However, Tiga's victory came at a cost. Daigo was no longer able to become Tiga after the Sparklence disintegrated into dust after his final battle. It is revealed that Tiga is no longer bound to Daigo, and his energy now remains in the hearts of all those who believe in Tiga, inner strength, and justice. Given the right conditions such as times of despair, the sparks will gather and the Tiga statue will be revitalized.

== Production ==
Konaka brothers (Chiaki and Kazuya) and Yoshikazu Okada separately prepared the original scripts of the 1995 film Gamera: Guardian of the Universe, where the Konaka plot was inspired by Tsuburaya and Toho's Daigoro vs. Goliath (1972), which itself was influenced by the Gamera franchise. The Konaka script was later reused for Gamera the Brave (2006), Gamera Rebirth (2023), Ultraman Tiga, and Digimon Tamers (2001) which was also influenced by Kaiju Booska (and Ultra Q) by Tsuburaya Productions.

== Episodes ==
No.	Title	Directed by	Written by	Original release date
1	"Inheritance of Light" ("The Prophecy"); Transliteration: "Hikari o Tsugu Mono" (Japanese: 光を継ぐもの)	Shingo Matsubara	Masakazu Migita	September 7, 1996
2	"Legend of the Stone" ("Monster in the Mine"); Transliteration: "Ishii no Shinwa" (Japanese: 石の神話)	Shingo Matsubara	Masakazu Migita	September 14, 1996
3	"The Devil’s Prophecy" ("The False Prophet"); Transliteration: "Akuma no Yogen" (Japanese: 悪魔の預言)	Hirochika Muraishi	Chiaki J. Konaka	September 21, 1996
4	"Goodbye, Planet Earth" ("Spark of Evil"); Transliteration: "Sa.Yo.Na.Ra Chikyū" (Japanese: サ・ヨ・ナ・ラ地球)	Hirochika Muraishi	Hidenori Miyazawa	September 28, 1996
5	"The Day When the Monster Appeared" ("Munakata’s Monster"); Transliteration: "Kaijū ga Detekita Hi" (Japanese: 怪獣が出てきた日)	Kyōta Kawasaki	Chiaki J. Konaka	October 5, 1996
6	"Second Contact" ("The Dark Cloud"); Transliteration: "Sekando Kontakuto" (Japanese: セカンド・コンタクト)	Kyōta Kawasaki	Chiaki J. Konaka	October 12, 1996
7	"The Man Who Came Down to Earth" ("Alien Invasion"); Transliteration: "Chikyū ni Oritekita Otoko" (Japanese: 地球に降りてきた男)	Yasushi Okada	Hidenori Miyazawa	October 19, 1996
8	"On the Night of Halloween" ("All Hallows Eve"); Transliteration: "Harowin no Yoru ni" (Japanese: ハロウィンの夜に)	Yasushi Okada	Masakazu Migita	October 26, 1996
9	"The Girl Who Waits for the Monster" ("Stranded"); Transliteration: "Kaijū o Matsu Shōjo" (Japanese: 怪獣を待つ少女)	Shingo Matsubara	Chiaki J. Konaka	November 2, 1996
10	"The Abandoned Amusement Park" ("Afraid of the Park"); Transliteration: "Tozasareta Yūenchi" (Japanese: 閉ざされた遊園地)	Shingo Matsubara	Hideyuki Kawakami	November 9, 1996
11	"Requiem to the Darkness" ("Friend or Foe?"); Transliteration: "Yami e no Rekuiemu" (Japanese: 闇へのレクイエム)	Shinichi Kamisawa	Junki Takegami	November 16, 1996
12	"S.O.S from the Bottom of the Sea" ("Mutant from the Sea"); Transliteration: "Shinkai kara no SOS" (Japanese: 深海からのSOS)	Shinichi Kamisawa	Nobuhisa Kodama	November 23, 1996
13	"Human Collection" ("Attack of the Crow-Men"); Transliteration: "Ningen Saishū" (Japanese: 人間採集)	Hirochika Muraishi	Minoru Kawasaki & Hirochika Muraishi	November 30, 1996
14	"The Unleashed Target" ("Nowhere to Hide"); Transliteration: "Hanatareta Hyōteki" (Japanese: 放たれた標的)	Hirochika Muraishi	Kazuyoshi Nakazaki & Hirochika Muraishi	December 7, 1996
15	"Phantom Dash" ("Revenge of Gazoto"); Transliteration: "Maboroshi no Shissō" (Japanese: 幻の疾走)	Kyōta Kawasaki	Junki Takegami	December 14, 1996
16	"The Revived Demon" ("The Monster Slayer Returns"); Transliteration: "Yomigaeru Kishin" (Japanese: よみがえる鬼神)	Kyōta Kawasaki	Hideyuki Kawakami	December 21, 1996
17	"The Battle Between Red and Blue" ("Dark vs Light"); Transliteration: "Aka to Ao no Tatakai" (Japanese: 赤と青の戦い)	Tōdō Fuyuki	Hidenori Miyazawa & Shinichi Kamisawa	December 28, 1996
18	"Golza Strikes Back!" ("Golza is Back!"); Transliteration: "Goruza no Gyakushū" (Japanese: ゴルザの逆襲)	Tōdō Fuyuki	Masakazu Migita	January 4, 1997
19	"GUTS Into Space (Part 1)" ("The Power of Light (Part 1)"); Transliteration: "Gattsu yo Sora e (Zenpen)" (Japanese: GUTSよ宙（そら）へ 前編)	Hirochika Muraishi	Chiaki J. Konaka	January 11, 1997
20	"GUTS Into Space (Part 2)" ("The Power of Light (Part 2)"); Transliteration: "Gattsu yo Sora e (Kōhen)" (Japanese: GUTSよ宙（そら）へ 後編)	Hirochika Muraishi	Chiaki J. Konaka	January 18, 1997
21	"Deban’s Turn!" ("The Show Must Go On!"); Transliteration: "Deban da Deban" (Japanese: 出番だデバン!)	Tsugumi Kitaura	Ai Ōta	January 25, 1997
22	"The Fog is Coming" ("The Fog"); Transliteration: "Kiri ga Kuru" (Japanese: 霧が来る)	Tsugumi Kitaura	Keiichi Hasegawa	February 1, 1997
23	"Planet of the Dinosaurs" ("Prehistoric Danger"); Transliteration: "Kyoryū-tachi no Hoshi" (Japanese: 恐竜たちの星)	Yasushi Okada	Junki Takegami	February 8, 1997
24	"Go! Monster Expedition Squad" ("Toxic Terror"); Transliteration: "Ike! Kaijyū Tankentai" (Japanese: 行け! 怪獣探検隊)	Yasushi Okada	Yasushi Hirano	February 15, 1997
25	"The Devil’s Judgement"; Transliteration: "Akuma no Shinpan" (Japanese: 悪魔の審判)	Hirochika Muraishi	Chiaki J. Konaka	February 22, 1997
26	"The Mysterical Monsterland"; Transliteration: "Niji no Kaijū Makyō" (Japanese: 虹の怪獣魔境)	Hirochika Muraishi	Masakazu Migita	March 1, 1997
27	"I Saw Obiko!"; Transliteration: "Obiko o Mita!" (Japanese: オビコを見た!)	Kyōta Kawasaki	Ai Ōta	March 8, 1997
28	"One Vanishing Moment"; Transliteration: "Utakata no..." (Japanese: うたかたの…)	Kyōta Kawasaki	Kyōta Kawasaki	March 15, 1997
29	"A Whiter Shade of Pale"; Transliteration: "Aoi Yoru no Kioku" (Japanese: 青い夜の記憶)	Masaki Harada	Keiichi Hasegawa	March 22, 1997
30	"The Monster Zoo"; Transliteration: "Kaijū Doōbutsuen" (Japanese: 怪獣動物園)	Masaki Harada	Kazunori Saito	March 29, 1997
31	"GUTS Base Under Attack"; Transliteration: "Osowareta Gattsu Kichi" (Japanese: 襲われたGUTS基地)	Tsugumi Kitaura	Hideyuki Kawakami	April 5, 1997
32	"The Battle of Zelda Point"; Transliteration: "Zeruda Pointo no Kōbō" (Japanese: ゼルダポイントの攻防)	Tsugumi Kitaura	Ai Ōta	April 12, 1997
33	"Vampire City"; Transliteration: "Kyūketsu Toshi" (Japanese: 吸血都市)	Hirochika Muraishi	Keiichi Hasegawa	April 19, 1997
34	"To The Farthest South"; Transliteration: "Minami no Hate Made" (Japanese: 南の涯てまで)	Hirochika Muraishi	Chiaki J. Konaka	April 26, 1997
35	"Sleeping Beauty"; Transliteration: "Nemuri no Otome" (Japanese: 眠りの乙女)	Teruyoshi Ishii	Chiaki J. Konaka	May 3, 1997
36	"The Smile Across Space and Time"; Transliteration: "Toki o Koeta Hohoemi" (Japanese: 時空をこえた微笑)	Teruyoshi Ishii	Masakazu Migita & Keiichi Hasegawa	May 10, 1997
37	"Flower"; Transliteration: "Hana" (Japanese: 花)	Akio Jissoji	Akio Satsukawa	May 17, 1997
38	"The Mirage Monster"; Transliteration: "Shinkirō no Kaijū" (Japanese: 蜃気楼の怪獣)	Kyōta Kawasaki	Shinsuke Onishi	May 24, 1997
39	"Dear Mr. Ultraman"; Transliteration: "Haikei Urutoraman-sama" (Japanese: 拝啓ウルトラマン様)	Kyōta Kawasaki	Keiichi Hasegawa	May 31, 1997
40	"Dream"; Transliteration: "Yume" (Japanese: 夢)	Akio Jissoji	Akio Satsukawa	June 7, 1997
41	"A Friend from Space"; Transliteration: "Uchū kara no Tomo" (Japanese: 宇宙からの友)	Tsugumi Kitaura	Ai Ōta	June 14, 1997
42	"The City Where the Girl Disappeared"; Transliteration: "Shōjo ga Kieta Machi" (Japanese: 少女が消えた街)	Tsugumi Kitaura	Keiichi Hasegawa	June 21, 1997
43	"The Land Shark"; Transliteration: "Chi no Same" (Japanese: 地の鮫)	Hirochika Muraishi	Chiaki J. Konaka	June 28, 1997
44	"Inheritance of Shadow"; Transliteration: "Kage o Tsugu Mono" (Japanese: 影を継ぐもの)	Hirochika Muraishi	Chiaki J. Konaka	July 5, 1997
45	"Eternal Life"; Transliteration: "Eien no Inochi" (Japanese: 永遠の命)	Shingo Matsubara	Masakazu Migita	July 12, 1997
46	"Let’s Go to Kamakura"; Transliteration: "Iza Kamakura!" (Japanese: いざ鎌倉!)	Shingo Matsubara	Masakazu Migita	July 19, 1997
47	"Goodbye to Darkness"; Transliteration: "Yami ni Sayōnara" (Japanese: 闇にさようなら)	Teruyoshi Ishii	Keiichi Hasegawa	July 26, 1997
48	"Fugitive from the Moon"; Transliteration: "Tsuki kara no Tōbōsha" (Japanese: 月からの逃亡者)	Teruyoshi Ishii	Masakazu Migita	August 2, 1997
49	"Star of Ultra"; Transliteration: "Urutora no Hoshi" (Japanese: ウルトラの星)	Masaki Harada & Kazuho Mitsuta	Shōzō Uehara	August 9, 1997
50	"Take Me Higher!"; Transliteration: "Motto Takaku!~Teiku Mī Haiyā~" (Japanese: もっと高く!～Take Me Higher!～)	Masaki Harada	Chiaki J. Konaka	August 16, 1997
51	"Ruler of Darkness"; Transliteration: "Ankoku no Shihaisha" (Japanese: 暗黒の支配者)	Hirochika Muraishi	Chiaki J. Konaka, Keiichi Hasegawa & Masakazu Migita	August 23, 1997
52	"To The Shining Ones"; Transliteration: "Kagayakeru Mono-tachi e" (Japanese: 輝けるものたちへ)	Hirochika Muraishi	Chiaki J. Konaka, Keiichi Hasegawa & Masakazu Migita	August 30, 1997

== Films ==
- Ultraman Tiga & Ultraman Dyna: Warriors of the Star of Light
- Ultraman Tiga, Ultraman Dyna, & Ultraman Gaia: The Decisive Battle in Hyperspace
- Ultraman Tiga: The Final Odyssey (2000): The story is set two years after the final episode.
- Ultraman Tiga Gaiden: Revival of the Ancient Giant (2001): A direct-to-video special set at prequel to TV series and set many years after the end of the series (Year 2038, 21 years after the events of Ultraman Dyna) In it, Daigo and Rena also have a son who is named Tsubasa.
- Superior Ultraman 8 Brothers
- Ultraman X The Movie: Here It Comes! Our Ultraman

== Cast ==
- Daigo Madoka (マドカ・ダイゴ, Madoka Daigo), Nagano (長野; 49): Hiroshi Nagano (V6) (長野 博 (V6), Nagano Hiroshi)
- Rena Yanase (ヤナセ・レナ, Yanase Rena): Takami Yoshimoto (吉本 多香美, Yoshimoto Takami)
- Megumi Iruma (イルマ・メグミ, Iruma Megumi), Yuzare (ユザレ, Yuzare; 50): Mio Takaki (高樹 澪, Takaki Mio)
- Seiichi Munakata (ムナカタ・セイイチ, Munakata Seiichi): Akitoshi Ohtaki (大滝 明利, Ōtaki Akitoshi)
- Masami Horii (ホリイ・マサミ, Horii Masami): Yukio Masuda (増田 由紀夫, Masuda Yukio)
- Tetsuo Shinjoh (シンジョウ・テツオ, Shinjō Tetsuo): Shigeki Kagemaru (影丸 茂樹, Kagemaru Shigeki)
- Jun Yazumi (ヤズミ・ジュン, Yazumi Jun): Yoichi Furuya (古屋 暢一, Furuya Yōichi)
- Souichiro Sawai (サワイ・ソウイチロウ, Sawai Sōichirō): Tamio Kawachi (川地 民夫, Kawachi Tamio)
- Masayuki Nahara (ナハラ・マサユキ, Nahara Masayuki): Uketa Take (タケ・ウケタ, Take Uketa)
- Tetsuji Yoshioka (ヨシオカ・テツジ, Yoshioka Tetsuji): Ken Okabe (岡部 健, Okabe Ken)
- Mayumi Shinjoh (シンジョウ・マユミ, Shinjō Mayumi): Kei Ishibashi (石橋 けい, Ishibashi Kei)
- Naban Yao (ヤオ・ナバン, Yao Naban): Ichirō Ogura (小倉 一郎, Ogura Ichirō)
- Reiko Kashimura (カシムラ・レイコ, Kashimura Reiko): Takako Kitagawa (北川 たか子, Kitagawa Takako)
- Yūji Tango (タンゴ・ユウジ, Tango Yūji): Yoichi Okamura (岡村 洋一, Okamura Yōichi)

=== Voice cast ===
- Ultraman Tiga: Yūji Machi (真地 勇志, Machi Yuji)
- Narrator, Ultraman (ウルトラマン, Urutoraman; 49): Issei Futamata (二又 一成, Futamata Issei)

=== Guest cast ===
- Omi Yanase (ヤナセ・オミ, Yanase Omi; 7): Shigeru Araki (荒木 しげる, Araki Shigeru)
- Ryosuke Sanada (サナダ・リョウスケ, Sanada Ryōsuke; 11, 47): Jun Yuzuhara (柚原 旬, Yuzuhara Jun)
- Sayaka Ijuin (イジュウイン・サヤカ, Ijūin Sayaka; 11, 47): Michiko Shimazaki (島崎 路子, Shimazaki Michiko)
- Zara (ザラ; 14): Shogo Shiotani (塩谷 庄吾, Shiotani Shōgo)
- Lucia (ルシア, Rushia; 14): Motoko Nagino (梛野 素子, Nagino Motoko)
- Takuma (拓磨; 15): Takuma Aoki (青木 拓磨, Aoki Takuma)
- Noodle Shop Vendor (夜鳴きそば屋, Yonaki Soba-ya; 27): Shoichiro Akaboshi (赤星 昇一郎, Akaboshi Shōichirō)
- Kiyoto Inui (イヌイ・キヨト, Inui Kiyoto; 41): Tom Saeba (冴場 都夢, Saeba Tomu)
- Keigo Masaki (マサキ・ケイゴ, Masaki Keigo; 43–44, 52): Takashi Kora (高良 隆志, Kōra Takashi)
- Shin Hayate (ハヤテ・シン, Hayate Shin; 48, 52): Masaki Kyomoto (京本 政樹, Kyōmoto Masaki)

== English dub ==
An English dub of the series was produced by 4Kids Entertainment and recorded by their in-house dubbing studio, 4Kids Productions. The dub aired on the Fox Box, which was formerly the Fox Kids Children's block on Fox in the United States. The first episode premiered on September 14, 2002.

4Kids' adaptation served as a parody of the original Ultraman series' English adaptation produced by Peter Fernandez and, as such, made some significant changes. Such changes include producing a new theme song and soundtrack that replaced the originals. Storylines were altered to comply with Fox's Standards and Practices division and accommodate commercial breaks and broadcasting scheduling. Each episode was one or two minutes shorter than its Japanese counterpart. The dub included tongue-in-cheek dialogue, which changed the personalities for some characters such as Captain Iruma, who was changed from a smart, level-headed individual to an airhead. Additionally, Captain Iruma was referred to as a "sir" instead of a "ma'am".

Some monsters were given new sound effects, and the transformation sequence was altered altogether, showcasing all of Tiga's forms and emphasizing the change from Daigo to Tiga. Tiga's "Multi, Power, and Sky Types" are changed into "Omni, Power, and Speed Modes," respectively. The Sparklence was renamed the "Torch of Tiga", although the Region 1 DVD Release refers to it as the "Spark Lance" for the first DVD but afterwards, the translation becomes "Sparklence". His light techniques were called "Luminizers", and the Color Timer is referred to as the "Biotic Sensor."

Ultraman Tiga was removed from the FoxBox lineup on March 15, 2003, due to low ratings, with only 24 episodes of the 52-episode series having aired. 4Kids initially planned to relaunch the show in September, but decided to release the Japanese episodes on DVD instead. As a result, their dub is only viewable through recordings of the original broadcasts. Erica Schroeder (who voiced Rena) claimed that part of the reason for Ultraman Tiga's limited success in the U.S. was due to 4Kids' indecision whether to satirize the show or make it serious.

=== English voice cast ===
- Wayne Grayson as Daigo Madoka
- Erica Schroeder as Rena Yanase
- Megan Hollingshead as Megumi Iruma
- Jimmy Zoppi as Masami Horii
- Andrew Paull as Tetsuo Shinjoh
- Sebastian Arcelus as Jun Yazumi
- David Moo
- Dan Green
- Mike Pollock
- Corinne Orr
- Michael Rosenbaum
- Jason Samuels
- Eric Stuart

== Remake ==
A modern retelling of the series titled Ultraman Trigger: New Generation Tiga (ウルトラマントリガー NEW GENERATION TIGA, Urutoraman Torigā Nyū Jenerēshon Tiga) was released in TV Tokyo from July 10, 2021, to January 22, 2022, as a commemoration for the 25th anniversary of the series. Actors Raiga Terasaka, Yuna Toyoda, Shunya Kaneko, Meiku Harakawa, Katsuya Takagi, Kei Hosogai and Shin Takuma portrayed as Kengo Manaka (Ultraman Trigger), Yuna Shizuma, Akito Hijiri, Tesshin Sakuma, Himari Nanase, Seiya Tatsumi, Ignis (Trigger Dark) and Mitsukuni Shizuma respectively, while M・A・O and Sumire Uesaka voiced Marluru and Carmeara respectively. The series was directed by Koichi Sakamoto as a main director, and was followed by Ultraman Decker on July 9, 2022.

== Songs ==
Opening theme

- "TAKE ME HIGHER"
  - Lyrics & Composition: Jennifer Batten, Alberto Emilio Contini, Giancarlo Pasquini
  - Japanese Lyrics: Kazumi Suzuki (鈴木 計美, Suzuki Kazumi)
  - Arrangement: Yasuhiko Hoshino (星野 靖彦, Hoshino Yasuhiko)
  - Strings Arrangement: Mitsuo Hagida (萩田 光雄, Hagida Mitsuo)
  - Chorus Arrangement: Hiroaki Suzuki (鈴木 弘明, Suzuki Hiroaki)
  - Artist: V6
  "TAKE ME HIGHER" reached #1 of the Oricon Weekly Rankings Charts for the week of September 30, 1996, and became a Platinum Record. For Mill Creek Entertainment's DVD release of the series, the song is replaced with "Mezameyo, Ultraman Tiga," except for episodes 3 and 4, which retain TAKE ME HIGHER.

Ending Theme

- "Brave Love, TIGA"
  - Producer: Gorō Kishitani (岸谷 五朗, Kishitani Gorō)
  - Lyrics: Sunplaza Nakano
  - Composition: Barbe-Q Wasada (バーベQ和佐田, Bābe Kyū Wasada)
  - Arrangement: Yasuhiko Fukuda (福田裕彦, Fukuda Yasuhiko)
  - Artist: Earth Protection Force (地球防衛団, Chikyū Bōei-dan)
  - Leader: Gorō Kishitani
  - Members: Takashi Utsunomiya (宇都宮 隆, Utsunomiya Takashi), Toshiaki Karasawa, Naoto Kine (木根 尚登, Kine Naoto), Sunplaza Nakano, Yasafumi Terawaki (寺脇 康文, Terawaki Yasufumi), Masahiko Nishimura, Barbe-Q Wasada, Papala Kawai (パッパラー河合, Papparā Kawai), Patrick Bommarito (パトリック・ボンマリート, Patorikku Bonmarīto), Funky Sueyoshi (ファンキー末吉, Fankī Sueyoshi), Yasuhiko Fukuda (福田 裕彦, Fukuda Yasuhiko), Honjamaka (ホンジャマカ; Hidehiko Ishizuka (石塚 英彦, Ishizuka Hidehiko), Toshiaki Megumi (恵 俊彰, Megumi Toshiaki))

Insert song

- "The memory of the blue night"
  - Lyrics and composition: G.BROOKER.K.RED
  - Artist: Hitomi Sudo ( Japanese Columbia )
- "ULTRAMAN LOVE FOR CHILDREN (Big band version instrumental)"
  - Composition: Hino Yasumasa
- "TAKE ME HIGHER (NEW ALBUM MIX)"
  - Lyrics and composition: Jennifer Batten, Alberto Emilio Contini, Giancarlo Pasquini
  - Japanese lyrics: Suzuki Tadashi
  - Arrangement: Hoshino Akihiko
  - Artist: V6

== Post–release ==
=== Adaptations ===
Dark Horse Comics published a Hong Kong manhua series based on Ultraman Tiga in 2003–2004, writer by Wong Yuk-long and illustrated by Khoo Fuk-lung.

=== Temporary ban on Chinese platforms ===
In September 2021, the series was removed from online streaming platforms in China. The removal triggered outcry from Chinese fans, trended on Sina Weibo, and began a hashtag which was viewed 84 million times. Various online platforms deduced that the series was banned under the pretext of the investigation into children's programming launched by Jiangsu Provincial Consumer Rights Protection Committee (江苏省消费者权益保护委员会), targeting various media for their potential negative influence on children due to violence, "dark" plots, and horrific and criminal content. The Jiangsu Committee would later deny its involvement, claiming the platforms banned the various series on their own accord.

However, due to public outcry, Ultraman Tiga and all other shows initially removed, would be returned to all major Chinese streaming video websites on September 27 of that same year, but in edited form.

== Home media ==
In July 2020, Shout! Factory announced to have struck a multi-year deal with Alliance Entertainment and Mill Creek Entertainment, with the blessings of Tsuburaya and Indigo, that granted them the exclusive SVOD and AVOD digital rights to the Ultra series and films (1,100 TV episodes and 20 films) acquired by Mill Creek the previous year. Ultraman Tiga, amongst other titles, will stream in the United States and Canada through Shout! Factory TV and Tokushoutsu. Mill Creek's DVD release of Ultraman Tiga was released on October 19, 2021.
