= Akiko Yada =

Japanese actress

- Born: December 23, 1978 (age 47); Kawasaki, Kanagawa, Japan
- Occupation: Actress
- Years active: 1995–present
- Spouse: Manabu Oshio (m. 2006; div. 2009)

Akiko Yada (矢田亜希子, Yada Akiko) is a Japanese actress. She won the award for Best Supporting Actress at the 6th Nikkan Sports Drama Grand Prix for Boku no Ikiru Michi.

== Filmography ==
=== Films ===
- Pyrokinesis (2000)
- Tales of the Unusual (2000)
- Impossibility Defense (2018)
- My Blood & Bones in a Flowing Galaxy (2021)
- Lita (2027)

=== Television ===
- Aishiteiru to itte kure (1995)
- Ring: The Final Chapter (1999)
- Rasen (1999)
- Friends (2002)
- Boku no Ikiru Michi (2003)
- Hotman (2003)
- The Great White Tower (2003–2004)
- Yume de Aimashou (2005)
- Top Caster (2006)

=== Dubbing ===
- Robots (Cappy)
