= Takami Yoshimoto =

Japanese actress

- 吉本 多香美
- Born: Takami Yoshimoto; October 13, 1971 (age 53); Ōmiya, Saitama, Japan
- Occupation(s): Actress, Model
- Years active: 1990–present
- Parent: Susumu Kurobe

Takami Yoshimoto (吉本 多香美, Yoshimoto Takami; born October 13, 1971) is a Japanese actress known for her role as Rena Yanase in 1996 Ultraman Tiga series. She won the best actress award at the 9th Japan Movie Professional Awards in 1999. She also starred the 1992 edition of "Christmas Express" commercials for the Central Japan Railway Company.

== Early life ==
On October 13, 1971, Yoshimoto was born in Tokyo, Japan. She is the eldest daughter of Susumu Kurobe who portrayed Shin Hayata in the 1966 Ultraman series.

== Career ==
In the 1990s, Yoshimoto started her career in drama series and she was known for Ultraman Tiga, which led to the 1998 Ultraman Tiga movie. In 2016, Yoshimoto starred as Tsukasa Tamaki in Ultraman X The Movie.

== Personal life ==
Yoshimoto was married in 2001 but divorced about four years later. In 2010, Yoshimoto married again. In 2011, Yoshimoto's son was born. Yoshimoto currently lives in Ishigaki Island with her family.

== Filmography ==
=== Movies ===
| Year | Title | Role | Notes |
|---|---|---|---|
| 1997 | Ki no ue no sogyo | Hiroshi Toriiyama (Hiromi) | |
| 1998 | Ultraman Tiga & Ultraman Dyna: Warriors of the Star of Light | Rena Yanase | The movie of Ultraman Dyna |
| 1999 | Minazuki | Yumi | |
| 2000 | Ultraman Tiga: The Final Odyssey | Rena Yanase | sequel of Ultraman Tiga |
| 2002 | Jam Films | | |
| 2004 | Tokyo Noir | | |
| 2005 | Mata no Hi no Chika | Chika | |
| 2008 | Great Decisive Battle! The Super 8 Ultra Brothers | Rena Yanase (credited as Rena Hayata) | alternate version of Ultraman Movie |
| 2016 | Ultraman X The Movie | Tsukasa Takami | |

=== Drama series ===
| Year | Title | Role |
|---|---|---|
| 1990 | Sekai Ururun Taizaiki | |
| 1996 | Ultraman Tiga | Rena Yanase |
| 1997 | Agri | |
| 1998 | Makasete Darling | |
| 1998 | Shin Mayonaka no Okoku (新・真夜中の王国) | |
| 1999 | Lipstick | Akiko Nagumo |
| 1999 | Rasen | Natsumi Aihara |
| 2000 | Good Job! | |
| 2000 | Paradise Thirty | |
| 2001 | Neverland | |
| 2002 | Omiya | |
| 2004 | Onyado Kawasemi | |
| 2005 | Risou no Seikatsu | |
| 2006 | Taikoki | |
