= Top Caster =

- Genre: Drama
- Written by: Yuji Sakamoto
- Directed by: Shin Hirano; Hiroki Hayama; Gō Shichitaka
- Starring: Yūki Amami; Akiko Yada; Hiroshi Tamaki; Shōsuke Tanihara
- Country of origin: Japan
- Original language: Japanese
- No. of episodes: 11

Production
- Producer: Yoshimasa Genōzono
- Running time: 54 minutes

Original release
- Network: Fuji TV
- Release: 17 April – 26 June 2006

Top Caster (トップキャスター) is a Japanese television drama series that aired on Fuji TV in 2006. Yūki Amami, who is known for The Queen's Classroom played the lead role for the first time in getsuku drama. The first episode received a viewership rating of 23.1%.

== Cast ==
- Yūki Amami as Haruka Tsubaki
- Akiko Yada as Nozomi Asuka
- Hiroshi Tamaki as Kensuke Kanihara
- Nao Matsushita as Mei Nohara
- Shota Matsuda as Shunpei Iga
- Shōsuke Tanihara as Masato Yūki

Preceded by Saiyūki; 9 January 2006 - 20 March 2006	Fuji TV Getsuku Drama; Mondays 21:00 - 21:54 (JST)	Succeeded by Suppli (10 July 2006 - 18 September 2006)
