= Rasen (TV series) =

- Genre: Drama; Mystery; Horror
- Screenplay by: Yoshihiro Kitayama
- Directed by: Yoshihiro Kitayama
- Starring: Goro Kishitani; Takami Yoshimoto; Takashi Naitou; Risa Junna; Seiichi Tanabe; Akiko Yada; Yuka Nomura; Risa Sudo; Takeshi Masu; Tae Kimura; Mayuko Azusa; Toshihide Tonesaku
- Music by: Dennis Martin
- Country of origin: Japan
- Original language: Japanese
- No. of seasons: 1
- No. of episodes: 13

Production
- Producers: Kenji Shimizu; Sousuke Osabe
- Running time: 45 minutes

Original release
- Network: Fuji TV
- Release: July 1 – September 23, 1999

Spiral (らせん, Rasen) is the sequel to the TV drama Ring: The Final Chapter, based on the novel Spiral by Koji Suzuki. Much like Ring: The Final Chapter, it does not adapt much of the original source material. There are a total of 13 episodes in the series.

== Cast ==
- Goro Kishitani as Mitsuo Ando
- Takami Yoshimoto as Natsumi Aihara
- Seiichi Tanabe as Kyōsuke Oda (Kenichi Azuma)
- Risa Junna as Miwako Ando
- Masaya Kudō as Takanori Ando
- Akiko Yada as Mai Takano (Sadako Yamamura)
- Tae Kimura as Sadako Yamamura
- Yuka Nomura as Kumiko Nishijima
- Risa Sudo as Misaki Nishijima
- Toshihide Tonesaku as Daisuke Asano
- Takeshi Masu as Toru Kawai
- Hiroshi Okouchi as Tsutomu Kasahara
- Mai Oikawa as Noriko Takamura
- Kensuke Toita as Takeo Sugisaki
- Masahiro Komoto as Keisuke Miyajima
- Tai Kageyama as Seiji Imanishi
- Aya Enjōji as Imanishi's wife
- Emiri Yada as Miyuki Takei
- Yuko Oshima as Aya/Satomi
- Mayuko Azusa as Oda's assistant
- Takashi Naito as Hiroshi Rikuta
- Shion Machida
- Hirohiko Kakegawa
- Tōru Nakane
- Chieko Namba
- Hiroto Yoshimitsu
- Yu Numazaki

== List of episodes ==
1. "Sadako's Revenge: A Horror Greater Than The Ring" - July 1, 1999
2. "The Dead Watch the Well" - July 8, 1999
3. "I Come to Kill Myself..." - July 15, 1999
4. "A Dead Person Is Resurrected to a Legendary Village" - July 22, 1999
5. "The Devil Was in This Room" - July 29, 1999
6. "Nobody Can Stop Me Any Longer" - August 5, 1999
7. "The Man Who Made Sadako" - August 12, 1999
8. "The Child Who Died Twice..." - August 19, 1999
9. "The Ring of Hatred Is Complete" - August 26, 1999
10. "The Prisoner Is Murdered by a Prison Guard" - September 2, 1999
11. "The Fortuneteller Is Murdered" - September 9, 1999
12. "The World Will Fall to Ruins Tomorrow" - September 16, 1999
13. "The Immortal" - September 23, 1999
