= Hiroshi Nagano =

Japanese singer (born 1972)

- Born: October 9, 1972 (age 53); Yamato, Kanagawa, Japan
- Occupations: Singer; actor; television host
- Years active: 1986–present
- Spouse: Miho Shiraishi (m. 2016)
- Children: 2
- Musical career
- Genres: J-pop
- Label: Avex Trax
- Formerly of: V6

Hiroshi Nagano (長野 博, Nagano Hiroshi) is a Japanese singer, actor, and television host. He is a former member of V6, a dance-vocal group formed in 1995 by Johnny & Associates, and its subunit 20th Century. He is best-known for his role in the popular tokusatsu series Ultraman Tiga, as the lead character, Daigo Madoka/Ultraman Tiga.

== Career ==
In 1986, at age 14, Nagano joined Johnny & Associates as a Johnny's Jr. He quit Johnny's Jr. in 1990 to continue his studies but rejoined in mid-1992. V6 was formed on 4 September 1995. They made their CD debut on 1 November 1995.

In 1988, Nagano made his acting debut in the television series, Kinpachi-sensei. He landed his first lead role in 1996 as Daigo Madoka in the tokusatsu television drama Ultraman Tiga. In addition to starring in the Ultraman Tiga television series, he has also appeared in several of its spin-offs and feature films.

== Personal life ==
Nagano was born on 9 October 1972 in Yamato, Kanagawa. His parents run a bicycle shop. Nagano is a qualified chef and vegetable sommelier. He married actress Miho Shiraishi on 29 November 2016. They have two children.

== Filmography ==
=== Film ===
Year	Title	Role	Director	Notes
1994	Shoot	Makoto Saiki	Kazuki Ōmori	
1998	Shinsei Toilet no Hanako-san	Professor Yabe	Yukihiko Tsutsumi	
2000	Ultraman Tiga: The Final Odyssey	Daigo Madoka/Ultraman Tiga	Hirochika Muraishi	Lead role
2001	Atlantis: The Lost Empire	Milo	Gary Trousdale, Kirk Wise	Voice role (Japanese dub)
2003	Hard Luck Hero	Kenshi Kishimoto	Sabu	Lead role with V6
2004	Thunderbirds	John Tracy	Jonathan Frakes	Voice role (Japanese dub)
2005	Hold Up Down	Yusuke Hoshino	Sabu	Lead role with V6
2008	Superior Ultraman 8 Brothers	Daigo Madoka/Ultraman Tiga	Takeshi Yagi	Lead role

=== Television (as an actor) ===
Year	Title	Role	Network	Notes
1988	Kinpachi-sensei Season 3	Kōji Naruse	TBS	
1994–1995	Shin Akakabu Kenji Funsenki	Masao Hīragi	TV Asahi	
1995	V no Honoo	Hiroshi Nagano	Fuji TV	Lead role with V6
1996	Handsome Man	Tobio Saeki	TV Asahi	Lead role
1996–1997	Ultraman Tiga	Daigo Madoka/Ultraman Tiga	TBS	Lead role
1998	Ultraman Dyna	Daigo Madoka	TBS	Guest appearance, ep 50–51
1998	Pu-Pu-Pu-		TBS	Guest appearance
1999	Tengoku ni Ichiban Chikai Otoko	Religious salesman	TBS	Episode 1
1999	Shin Oretachi no Tabi Ver.1999	Street musician	Fuji TV	
2001	Shōnen Taiya: Gypsy	Convenience store clerk	Fuji TV	Mini-drama
2002	Shōnen Taiya: Shitsuon (Yoru no Ongaku)	Masaki Mamiya	Fuji TV	Mini-drama, lead role
2002	Engimono: Nishiki★Koi	Takayuki Mizuno	Fuji TV	Mini-drama, lead role
2003	Kimi wa Pet	Yūji Yoshida	TBS	Guest appearance
2004	Engimono: Grift no Teguchi	Teramachi	Fuji TV	Mini-drama, lead role
2004	Nurseman	Tetsurō Wakatsuki	Nippon TV	Guest appearance
2005	Gekidan Engimono: Atarashii Ikimono	Takashi Ono	Fuji TV	Mini-drama, lead role
2006	2nd House	Kōichi Misawa	TV Tokyo	Lead role
2006	Keishichō Sōsaikka 9 Gakari SP	Akihisa Manabe	TV Asahi	Television special
2007	Benkyo Shiteitai!	Junpei Hashiguchi	NHK	Lead role
2008	Yasuko to Kenji	Kenichi Shimada	Nippon TV	Guest appearance
2020	Karera wo Mireba Wakaru Koto	Kamoi Yosuke	Wowow	
2020	Haken no Hinkaku 2	Atsushi Sumida	Nippon TV	Episode 6

=== Television (as a personality) ===
Year	Title	Role	Network	Notes
1993–1997	Idol on Stage	Cast member	NHK BS2	
1994	Chōjin: Dutch Ball Densetsu	Cast member	Kansai TV	
1999–2002	Boon!	Cast member	Nippon TV	
2002–2004	Mobi	Host	Nippon TV	100 episodes
2008	Gekkan Moto GP Plus	Cast member	Nippon TV	
2010–2011	Ryōri no Kaijin	Host	TV Asahi	
2011	1 Oku-ri no Dai Shitsumon!? Waratte Koraete!	Host/Cast member	Nippon TV	Host of one corner
2011–2013	Oh! Doya Kao Summit	Host/Cast member	TV Asahi	Host of the gourmet editions
2012–present	Mizuno Maki no Mahō no Restaurant R	Cast member	MBS	
2013–present	Hare, Tokidoki Farm!	Host	NHK BS Premium	
2013–2018	Ametalk	Guest	TV Asahi	5 episodes
2017–present	Yojigoji Days	Host	TV Tokyo	Wednesday host
