= Change the World (V6 song) =

2000 single by V6

Single by V6

from the album Volume 6
- B-side: "Jougen no Tsuki"; "Silver Bells"
- Released: October 25, 2000
- Genre: J-Pop
- Label: Avex Trax
- Songwriter: Rie Matsumoto
- Producer: Miki Watanabe

V6 singles chronology
"In the Wind" (2000)	"Change the World" (2000)	"Ai no Melody" (2001)

Music video
- "Change the World" on YouTube

"Change the World" is a song by Japanese boy band V6. It was released on October 25, 2000, through Avex Trax, as the band's seventeenth single. The song was used as the first opening theme for the anime series Inuyasha. The single peaked at number 3 on the Oricon singles chart and stayed on the chart for thirteen weeks.

== Track listing ==
- CD single
1. "Change the World"
2. "Jōgen no Tsuki" (上弦の月; "Quarter moon")
3. "Silver Bells"
4. "Change the World" (Original Karaoke)
5. "Jōgen no Tsuki" (Original Karaoke)
6. "Silver Bells" (Original Karaoke)

== Charts ==
=== Weekly charts ===
Chart (2000)	Peak position
Japan (Oricon)	3
