= V6 (band) =

Japanese boy band

- Origin: Tokyo, Japan
- Genres: J-pop
- Years active: 1995–2021
- Label: Avex Trax
- Past members: 20th Century; Masayuki Sakamoto; Hiroshi Nagano; Yoshihiko Inohara; Coming Century; Go Morita; Ken Miyake; Junichi Okada
- Website: V6 Avex Trax; Johnny's net

V6 (ブイシックス, Bui Shikkusu) was a six-member Japanese boy band formed by Johnny & Associates. The group debuted on November 1, 1995, with the single "Music for the People", which was used as the image song for the 1995 World Cup of Volleyball. Their first four singles, including "Music for the People", were all cover versions of the same-titled Eurobeat songs composed by Italian producers such as Giancarlo Pasquini, Andrea Leonardi, Alberto Contini, and Sandro Oliva.

Similar to their agency seniors Hikaru Genji, the group was separated into two subgroups based on age. For V6, the group was split into 20th Century and Coming Century, which consist of the three oldest members and the three youngest members, respectively. The band sold more than 13.5 million albums and singles.

As separate bands, both of them performed the opening song for the anime, Eyeshield 21. Coming Century performed "Breakthrough", the first opening theme song, and 20th Century performed "Innocence", the second opening theme song. As V6, they performed "Chain of Power" as an insert song. They also sang "Change the World" and "Brand New World", respectively the first opening and eighth ending themes of the anime series InuYasha, as well as "Break Out", the 18th opening song of the popular anime Fairy Tail. They later performed the 21st opening song of One Piece, "Super Powers".

As announced on March 12, 2021, V6 disbanded on November 1, 2021, their 26th anniversary since their debut. Many of its former members left the agency throughout 2023 as the Johnny Kitagawa sexual abuse scandal broke that year. The sub-group "20th Century" would have continued activities since.

== History ==
=== Name ===
In an interview on Hey! Hey! Hey! Music Champ, the group stated that the "V" in V6 also stood for "Versus" (20th Century versus Coming Century) at first. However, the now-disgraced then-president Johnny Kitagawa informed the group that the "V" had multiple meanings, such as "Volleyball", "Vegetable" (as Sakamoto's parents own a green grocers), "Bicycle" ("V" and "B" are indistinguishable in Japanese; Nagano's parents own a cycling store), and "Veteran".

=== 1995–2021 ===
In 1996 they made the opening for the 12th entry in the Ultraman Series, Ultraman Tiga named Take Me Higher. From 1997 to 2008, V6 hosted their own variety show Gakkō e Ikō (学校へ行こう, Let's Go to School) and later hosted Viva Viva V6 since 2001 on Fuji TV. Along with their group shows, the members also have individual TV shows, dramas, or radio programs.

In 1997, V6, Tokio and Kinki Kids were grouped together as a special unit, called J-Friends, to raise money for schools affected by the Great Hanshin earthquake in 1995. The unit disbanded in 2003, after recording 6 singles and holding special concerts and events.

The Japanese version of Thunderbirds uses "Thunderbird - your voice -" by the group for the theme song of the movie.

V6 celebrated their tenth anniversary in 2005, commemorating the event by holding about thirty concerts in sold-out arenas all over Japan, holding three major "Thank You Events", releasing the movie Hold Up Down and releasing Musicmind as their new album. They also had a rare "Handshake Session" with hundreds of thousands of fans in Tokyo, Nagoya, Osaka and Fukuoka.

As separate bands, both of them performed the opening song for the anime, Eyeshield 21. Coming Century performed "Breakthrough", the first opening theme song, and 20th Century performed "Innocence", the second opening theme song. As V6, they performed "Chain of Power" as an insert song. They also sang "Change the World" and "Brand New World", respectively the first opening and eighth ending themes of the anime series InuYasha, as well as "Break Out", the 18th opening song of the popular anime Fairy Tail. They later performed the 21st opening song of One Piece, "Super Powers".

On May 3, 2017, they released the double A-side single titled "COLORS/Taiyou to Tsuki no Kodomotachi". The title track "COLORS" was used as the theme song for member Yoshihiko Inohara's starring drama "Keishicho Sousa Ikka 9 Gakari season12" on TV Asahi. Meanwhile, "Taiyou to Tsuki no Kodomotachi" was picked up for NHK's "Minna no Uta" for April and May.

On March 12, 2021, Johnny & Associates announced V6 would disband on November 1, V6's 26th debut anniversary. In July, they announced that they would host their last concert tour, LIVE TOUR V6 groove from September 4 to November 1, the first day and the last day of the live tour, which is the date of V6 formation and their debut date. Also, they will release their new album STEP on September 4.

On October 26, 2021, V6 hosted their last TV variety show Gakkō e Ikō (学校へ行こう 2021, Let's Go to School 2021) as a group. They also released their last best album Very6 BEST.

On November 1, 2021, member Go Morita also left the agency, effectively dissolving also the sub-group "Coming Century", though Okada and Miyake continued with their individual activities. Miyake left the agency on 2 May 2023 as the Johnny Kitagawa sexual abuse scandal broke, while Okada left on 30 November 2023. Sub group "20th Century" would continue activities past that date.

=== Beyond disbandment ===
On October 26, 2025, it was announced that the discography of the group would be released on streaming and download sites on November 1, And 20th Century to open "Cafe 20th Century" in Jiyugaoka, 2 years after the opening and around 10 months after the closing of the previous store in Shibuya.

== Members ==
=== 20th Century ===
- Masayuki Sakamoto (坂本 昌行, Sakamoto Masayuki) — (leader of V6 and 20th Century)
- Hiroshi Nagano (長野 博, Nagano Hiroshi)
- Yoshihiko Inohara (井ノ原 快彦, Inohara Yoshihiko)

=== Coming Century ===
(Officially disbanded when Go Morita left)

- Go Morita (森田 剛, Morita Gō) — (leader of Coming Century) (left 1 November 2021)
- Ken Miyake (三宅 健, Miyake Ken) (left 2 May 2023)
- Junichi Okada (岡田 准一, Okada Jun'ichi) (left 30 November 2023)

== Discography ==
Studio albums

- Since 1995: Forever (1996)
- Nature Rhythm (1997)
- A Jack in the Box (1998)
- "Lucky" 20th Century, Coming Century to Be Continued... (1999)
- "Happy" Coming Century, 20th Century Forever (2000)
- Volume 6 (2001)
- Seven (2002)
- Infinity: Love & Life (2003)
- Musicmind (2005)
- Voyager (2007)
- Ready? (2010)
- Oh! My! Goodness! (2013)
- The Ones (2017)
- Step (2021)

Compilation albums

- Very Best (2001)
- Very Best II (2006)
- Super Very Best (2015)
- Very6 Best (2021)

== Videography ==
=== DVD/VHS ===
- 1996: Live for the People
- 1997: Film V6: Clips and More
- 1998: Space (from V6 Live Tour '98)
- 1999: Film V6 Cct II: Clips and More
- 2001: Very Happy!!!
- 2002: Film V6 Act III: Clips and More
- 2002: Liv6
- 2003: Hard Luck Hero (movie)
- 2004: Love & Life (V6 Summer Special Dream Live 2003)
- 2005: Film V6 Act IV (Ballad Clips and More)
- 2005: Film V6 act IV (Dance Clips and More)
- 2005: Very Best Live (1995—2004)
- 2005: Hold Up Down (movie)
- 2006: 10th Anniversary Concert Tour 2005: Musicmind
- 2008: V6 Live Tour 2007 Voyager (Boku to Bokura no Ashita)
- 2009: V6 Live Tour 2008 Vibes
- 2010: V6 Live DVD Asia Tour 2010 in Japan Ready?
- 2012: V6 Live Tour 2011 Sexy.Honey.Bunny!
- 2013: V6 Live Tour 2013 Oh! My! Goodness!
- 2016: V6 Live Tour 2015 -since 1995~forever-
- 2018: LIVE TOUR 2017 The ONES
- 2021: For the 25th anniversary
- 2022: LIVE TOUR V6 groove

==== 20th Century ====
- 2009: 20th Century Live Tour 2008 Ore Ja Nakya, Kimi Ja Nakya
- 2009: 20th Century Live Tour 2009 Honey Honey Honey

==== Coming Century ====
- 1997: Sky
- 1998: Question
- 2003: Cosmic Rescue (movie)
- 2009: We are Coming Century Boys Live Tour 2009

== Other activities ==
As a group, the members of V6 have done dramas such as V no Honoo in 1995 and movies such as Hard Luck Hero in 2003 and Hold Up Down in 2005.

=== Films ===
==== V6 ====
- "Hard Luck Hero" (ハードラックヒーロー) (2003)
- "Thunderbirds" (サンダーバード) (2004) (Japanese dub)
- "Hold Up Down" (ホールドアップダウン) (2005)

==== Coming Century ====
- COSMIC RESCUE (2003)

=== Drama ===
- "V no Honoo" (Vの炎) (1995, Fuji TV) – all members of V6
- PU-PU-PU- (1998, TBS) – members of Kamisen
- "Shin・Oretachi no Tabi Ver.1999" (新・俺たちの旅Ver.1999) (1999, NTV) – members of Kamisen
- "Shounentaiya(doramaserekushon)『Shinsen~Yoru no Ongaku』" (少年タイヤ（ドラマセレクション）『室温〜夜の音楽〜』) (Fuji TV) – members of Tonisen

=== Variety shows ===
- "Majikaru Zunou Pawaa!!" (マジカル頭脳パワー!!) (1996–1999, NTV)
- "Gakkou e Ikou!" (学校へ行こう!; lit. 'Let's Go to School!') (1997–2005, TBS)
  - "Gakkou e Ikou!MAX" (学校へ行こう!MAX, Let's Go to School!MAX) (2005–2008, TBS)
  - "Gakkou e Ikou! 2015" (学校へ行こう!2015; Let's Go to School!2015) (Nov 13, 2015, TBS)
  - "V6 no Ai Nanda 2017" (V6の愛なんだ2017 史上最高の夏まつり!; V6 This is Love 2017 – The best Summer Festival!) (Aug 30, 2017, TBS)
  - "V6 no Ai Nanda 2018" (V6の愛なんだ2018; V6 This is Love 2018) (Sep 24, 2018, TBS)
  - "V6 no Ai Nanda 2019" (V6の愛なんだ2019; V6 This is Love 2019) (Sep 23, 2019, TBS)
  - "V6 no Ai Nanda 2020" (V6の愛なんだ2020; V6 This is Love 2020) (November 3, 2020, TBS)
  - "Gakkou e Ikou! 2021" (学校へ行こう!2021; Let's Go to School!2021) (October 26, 2021, TBS)
- "24 Jikan Terebi" (24時間テレビ; 24 Hour Television) (NTV, 1998, 2000)
- "V6 no Moto" (V6の素) (1999–2000, Fuji TV)
- "Mahha buiroku" (マッハブイロク; Mach V6) (2000, Fuji TV)
- "Owarai V6 Byoutou" (お笑いV6病棟!; lit. Laughable V6 Hospital) (2000–2001, Fuji TV)
- "MyMiCen!" (ミミセン!; short form of "Mysterious Midnight Century") (2001, TBS) – Kamisen
- "Otosen!" (オトセン!; short form of "Otona Century" lit. Adult Century) (2001–2002, TBS) - Kamisen
- "Otosen II" (オトセンII) (2002, TBS) – Kamisen
- "Rabusen!" (ラブセン!; short form of "Love Century") (2002–2004, TBS)
- "Asuriito Ouen TV! Nippon! Chax3" (アスリート応援TV! ニッポン!チャ×3) (2006–2007, TBS) - Tonisen
- "VivaVivaV6" (2001–2010, Fuji TV)
- "Shinchishiki Kaikyuu Kumagusu" (新知識階級 クマグス) (2008–2010, TBS)
- "Mission V6" (ミッションV6; Mission V6) (2010–2011, TBS)
- "Otoko no Hensaachi" (男のヘンサーチ!!; Search for Strange Men) (Oct 2011 – Oct 2012, TBS)
- "Gacha Gacha V6" (ガチャガチャV6; Gacha Gacha V6) (October 2012 – March 2014, TBS)
- "V6 LOVE VICTORY" (ヴィシックスラヴヴィクトリー; V6 LOVE VICTORY) (April 2013 - 2 Episodes Aired only TBS)
- "AMAZIPANG" (アメージパング; AMAZIPANG) (April 2014 – October 2021, TBS)
