= Yoshihiko Inohara =

Japanese entertainer (born 1976)

- Born: May 17, 1976 (age 50); Asakusa, Tokyo, Japan
- Occupations: Actor; singer; host
- Years active: 1988–present
- Spouse: Asaka Seto (m. 2007)
- Children: 2
- Musical career
- Genre: J-pop
- Label: MENT Recording
- Member of: 20th Century
- Formerly of: V6
- Website: Starto Entertainment 20th Century member profile

Yoshihiko Inohara (Japanese: 井ノ原快彦, Hepburn: Inohara Yoshihiko) (born May 17, 1976) is a Japanese actor, singer and host. He is a former member of boy band V6 and a member of 20th Century. His nickname is "Inocchi".

Born in Asakusa, Taitō, Tokyo and raised in Yashio, Shinagawa, Tokyo. He belongs to Starto Entertainment and formerly served as CMO (Chief marketing officer) until June 27, 2025. His wife is actress Asaka Seto.

== Early life ==
As a child, he lived in Asakusa, Tokyo, and grew up in an apartment complex in Shinagawa Ward.

== Artistic career ==
His entry into the entertainment industry began when he watched the popular detective drama Seibu Keisatsu as a child and wished to work for Ishihara Promotions, to which the lead actor belonged. However, Ishihara Promotion was famous for making its actors eat a large meal, and he gave up Ishihara Promotion because he thought he couldn't eat a large meal, and chose to join Johnny & Associates.

Inohara sent his own resume to the Johnny & Associates when he was in the fifth grade of elementary school. Johnny's boy band Hikaru Genji was very popular in Japan at the time. A year passed, and when the invitation to audition came in the sixth grade, he went to the venue thinking he had totally passed the audition. Then there were about 100 applicants there who had practiced dancing, and he thought, "Oh no! I can't pass the audition." Inohara had written on his resume that he could do backflips, but he failed in front of Kitagawa and hit his head on the floor. Kitagawa got angry with him, saying, "You are a liar!". But then, while talking with Kitagawa, Inohara mistook the chewing gum that Kitagawa was about to eat for something he could have and said, "Thank you." Kitagawa then said, "It's not yours. But don't forget that brazenness," and he passed the audition. Inohara soon thereafter appeared as a back-up dancer at a Hikaru Genji concert.

In 1988, at the age of 12, he entered Johnny & Associates. Then he made his CD debut on November 1, 1995, as a member of the boy band V6 with the single Music for the people.

After his debut, in addition to being a member of V6, he personally hosted, mainly for the public broadcaster NHK and acted in detective dramas such as TV Asahi's Metropolitan Police Department Investigation Section 9 Series and Special investigation department 9 Series.

As of October 2023, he decided to continue with his artistic activities together with his administrative responsibilities in the agency.

== His Johnny & Associates / Smile Up / Starto Entertainment administrative roles ==
On November 1, 2022, following Hideaki Takizawa's retirement as representative director of Johnny's Island (later Annex), it was announced that Inohara had been appointed president of the company as of September 26, 2022. Johnny's Island is a company that produces stage and live performances for trainees before their debut, and discovers and trains new talent. After that, he worked as a playing manager to nurture talent and trainees (junior) at the same time.

On October 2, 2023, at a press conference regarding the new structure of Johnny & Associates, Inohara announced that he had been appointed vice president of Smile-Up.

On December 8, 2023, Inohara was appointed COO (Chief operating officer) of the newly established company Starto Entertainment. He announced that he would be resigning as vice president of Smile-Up. (formerly Johnny & Associates) on the same date. On April 10, 2024, it was announced that his position changed from COO to CMO (chief marketing officer).

With the launch of Starto, it was announced that a new division for the training of young people would be established, and trainees formerly affiliated with Annex would also be affiliated with Starto. With the closing of Annex, Inohara, who was president of the company, had reportedly already resigned at the end of March 2024.

On June 27, 2025, Inohara stepped down as CMO (Chief Marketing Officer) upon the expiration of his term and in accordance with his own wishes. It was announced that he would focus solely on his entertainment career thereafter.

== Personal life ==
On September 28, 2007, he announced his marriage to Asaka Seto, an actress with whom he had been dating for some time. On November 1, 2021, V6 disbanded, leaving him only as a member of 20th Century and as a solo performer.

Inohara says that a particularly close friend is Masahiro Matsuoka, who was the same age as him, and that they have been best friends since they were both in elementary school up to the present day. When Inohara joined to Johnny's, Matsuoka had moved to Tokyo from Hokkaido and was living in a Johnny's dormitory. He and Inohara hit it off and often visited Inohara at the apartment complex where Inohara's family lived. When Inohara was appointed president of Johnny's Island in November 2022, Matsuoka was so pleased that he commented that he was proud to be his best friend.

== Major Appearances ==
=== TV drama ===
- Metropolitan Police Department Investigation Section 9 Series - as Naoki Asawa (TV Asahi)
  - Metropolitan Police Department Investigation Section 9 SP（Special）（2006)
  - Metropolitan Police Department Investigation Section 9 season 2 (2007)
  - Metropolitan Police Department Investigation Section 9, Season 3 (2008)
  - New Metropolitan Police Department Investigation Section 9 (2009)
  - New Metropolitan Police Department Investigation Section 9, season 2 (2010)
  - New Metropolitan Police Department Investigation Section 9, season 3 (2011)
  - Metropolitan Police Department Investigation Section 9, Season 7 (2012)
  - Metropolitan Police Department Investigation Section 9, Season 8 (2013)
  - Metropolitan Police Department Investigation Section 9, 9th series (2014)
  - Metropolitan Police Department Investigation Section 9, 10th series (2015)
  - Metropolitan Police Department Investigation Section 9, 11th series (2016)
  - Metropolitan Police Department Investigation Section 9, 12th series (2017)
- Special investigation department 9 series - Starring Naoki Asawa (TV Asahi)
  - Special investigation department 9 (2018)
  - Special investigation department 9 season 2 (2019)
  - Special investigation department 9 season 3 (2020)
  - Special investigation department 9 season 4 (2021)
  - Special investigation department 9 season5 (2022)
  - Special investigation department 9 season6 (2023)
  - Special investigation department 9 season7 (2024)

=== Film ===
- Heaven Can Wait (2007), Hiroki Nishioka
- 461 Days of Bento: A Promise Between Father and Son (2020), Kazuki Suzumoto
- The High School Family (2027), Tatsuya Aoyama

=== Information TV Programs ===
- 2010 Winter Olympics (February 20, 2010 - February 28, 2010, TV Tokyo) - Host
- Asaichi (March 29, 2010 - March 30, 2018, NHK) - Host

=== Music Programs ===
- 43rd Memories of Melody (August 13, 2011, NHK) - Host
- 66th NHK Kōhaku Uta Gassen (December 31, 2015, NHK and NHK Radio 1) - Host (White team captain)
- Minna no Uta 60 (2021 - 2022, NHK Educational) - Host
- Minna no Uta 60 Special - Start of the 60th year! ～(February 27, 2021, NHK Educational) - Host
- Minna no Uta 60 Live Broadcast - Birthday Special! ～(April 3, 2021, NHK Educational) - Host
- Minna no Uta 60 Tokuoki Memories Special (January 24, 2022, NHK Educational) - Host (January 24, 2022, NHK Educational) - Host
- Minna no Uta 60 Finale (March 5, 2022, NHK Educational) - Host
