= Inuyasha season 4 =

Season of television series

Inuyasha
- Season 4
- Cover of the North American season 4 box set released by Viz Media
- No. of episodes: 40

Release
- Original network: ytv
- Original release: October 13, 2003 – September 13, 2004

Season chronology
- ← Previous; Season 3 Next → The Final Act

The fourth season of the anime television series Inuyasha aired on Yomiuri TV in Japan from October 13, 2003, to September 13, 2004. Based on Rumiko Takahashi's manga series, the anime series was produced by Sunrise. It continues with Inuyasha and his friends, on a journey to obtain the shards of the Shikon Jewel from the spider half-demon Naraku.

The series was licensed by Viz Media in North America. The English dub of the fourth season was broadcast on Cartoon Network as part of its Adult Swim programming block from January 11, 2006, through October 27, 2006.

In Japan, the fourth season was retroactively collected under the title Fierce Battle Arc (激闘編, Gekitō-hen).

Six pieces of theme music are used across this season; two opening themes and four ending themes, with two of the endings being used for special episodes. The opening themes are "One Day, One Dream" by Tackey & Tsubasa for episodes 128–153 and "Angelus" (ANGELUS -アンジェラス-, Anjerasu) by Hitomi Shimatani for episodes 154–167. The two regular ending themes are "Come" by Namie Amuro for episodes 128–146 and "Brand-New World" by V6 for episodes 149–166, while the two special ending themes are the very first opening and ending set used for the anime series: "Change the World" by V6 for episodes 147–148 and "My Will" by Dream for episode 166–167.

== Episode list ==
No. overall	No. in season	Title	Directed by	Written by	Storyboarded by	Original release date	English air date
128	1	"Battle Against the Dried-Up Demons at the Cultural Festival!"; Transliteration: "Himono Yōkai to Gekitō Bunkasai" (Japanese: 干物妖怪と激闘文化祭)	Tomoe Aratani	Akatsuki Yamatoya	Tomoe Aratani	October 13, 2003	January 11, 2006
It is revealed the dried-up food Kagome returned from Feudal Japan are actually dehydrated food demons when boiled in water. Inuyasha destroys them from the high school, and Kagome completes her understudy assignments, minding her attention of the demons. During the stage performance, Inuyasha interrupts the play and Kagome ad-libs to evade the scene. Note: Just before her choral performance, Jimmy Kudo and Rachel Moore made cameo appearances after Case Closed.
129	2	"Chokyukai and the Abducted Bride"; Transliteration: "Chokyukai to Ryakudatsusareta Hanayome" (Japanese: 猪九戒と略奪された花嫁)	Kiyoshi Fukumoto	Junki Takegami	Kiyoshi Fukumoto	October 20, 2003	January 18, 2006
A young man named Kisuke accompanies Inuyasha and his friends, when the maidens are being kidnapped by demons using a golden diadem to control them, mentioning they are trapped in a nearby cave. The demons are recognized as the folklore characters of Journey to the West, being the heavenly spirits who had accompanied the Buddhist monk Tripitaka. Chokyukai, as a descendant of Pigsy, wears the necklace of skulls worn by Sandy, bewitching the maidens using a diadem similar to that worn by the Monkey King. Chokyukai asks Kagome to be his bride, thrilled with her knowledge about his ancestors. Kagome is allured by the diadem, to which she is later abducted. Inuyasha and his friends elaborately try to distract Chokyukai and free Kagome. She later uses her Sacred Arrow along with Miroku's Sacred Sutra in order to defeat Chokyukai.
130	3	"Shippo's New Technique, The Heart Scar!"; Transliteration: "Hoero Shippō Ōgi Kokoro no Kizu" (Japanese: 吠えろ七宝奥義 心の傷!)	Teruo Sato	Katsuhiko Chiba	Toshifumi Kawase	October 27, 2003	January 25, 2006
Several young fox yōkai, who are searching for their parents, mistake Shippo for a hero when Inuyasha recently destroyed a demon. They convince Shippo to become their leader and fight the salamander demon, but he refuses. They later trick him into betraying Mizuki. When the salamander demon returns, Shippo defeats it.
131	4	"Trap of the Cursed Wall Hanging"; Transliteration: "Kannon Kakejiku Noroi no Wana" (Japanese: 観音掛け軸 呪いの罠)	Megumi Yamamoto	Katsuyuki Sumisawa	Megumi Yamamoto	November 3, 2003	February 1, 2006
Inuyasha and his friends are informed by an old man who tells them about a village of women tossing a corpse into a marsh. As they investigate, they find themselves helping a young man named Shinnosuke to search for his lost lady love named Wakana. They spend the night at the village. Miroku and Sango are separately reminded of their moment together at Mount Hakurei. Miroku falls prey into flirtation and is accompanied to a shrine, leading to an encounter with the head of an oni Sango soon becomes captured and shackled inside a cave, and possessed by a salamander egg she swallowed. Shinnosuke reunites with Wakana, but he is unaware of what is to come.
132	5	"Miroku's Most Dangerous Confession"; Transliteration: "Miroku Hōshi no Mottomo Kiken na Kokuhaku" (Japanese: 弥勒法師の最も危険な告白)	Masakazu Amiya	Katsuyuki Sumisawa	Mitsuko Kase	November 10, 2003	February 8, 2006
Inuyasha, Kagome, and Shippo are surrounded by the possessed women of the village. The head of the oni explains her body was sealed into a scroll desiring the need for the flesh of men to return to her human form. The head of the oni is revealed itself as a salamander demon. Inuyasha defeats it. Miroku uses his Sacred Sutras to save the women from being possessed any further, in which they regurgitate salamanders from their stomachs. Miroku removes the salamander from Sango, and realizes how much she truly means to him.
133 (Note: Episodes 133 and 134 originally aired together as a one-hour special.)	6	"The Woman Who Loved Sesshomaru, Part 1"; Transliteration: "Sesshōmaru o Aishita Onna, Zenpen" (Japanese: 犬夜叉スペシャル 殺生丸を愛した女)	Satoshi Toba, Teruo Sato	Katsuyuki Sumisawa	Mitsuko Kase, Toshifumi Kawase	November 24, 2003	February 15, 2006
While an ill nun named Sara Asano plays the flute, Inuyasha and his friends pass by the convent, to which Sara releases demonic aura and dies after catching sight of Inuyasha. A resurrected Sara meets Sesshomaru, reminding him of their encounter at her castle during a time when Sesshomaru defended her castle. She reveals her deep infatuation for him, hoping to garner his interest. Meanwhile, Inuyasha and his friends find a woman, unbeknownst as Sara, wanting to be sacrificed to a sea demon to break a curse of ice, of which Miroku and Sango are victimized. Inuyasha, Kagome, and Shippo enter shrine, before Sara steals Tetsusaiga.
134	7	"The Woman Who Loved Sesshomaru, Part 2"; Transliteration: "Sesshōmaru o Aishita Onna, Kōhen" (Japanese: 犬夜叉スペシャル 殺生丸を愛した女)	Satoshi Toba, Teruo Sato	Katsuyuki Sumisawa	Mitsuko Kase, Toshifumi Kawase	November 24, 2003	February 22, 2006
Sesshomaru discovers Sara keeping the Tetsusaiga, before Inuyasha follows her. Sara tells Sesshomaru of the time when he first asks her to give him the Tetsusaiga and of the time the Asano clan attempted to kill Sesshomaru. She recalls being surrounded by apparitions during her illness, allowing herself to be consumed for her rebirth, all to devote herself to Sesshomaru. As Inuyasha arrives to retrieve Tetsusaiga, while Sesshomaru releases the apparitions from Sara. She is unveiled as a medium, possessed by a demon. The Tetsusaiga is first wielded by Sesshomaru in order to destroy the demon, and by Inuyasha in order to eradicate the apparitions.
135	8	"The Last Banquet of Miroku's Master"; Transliteration: "Miroku no Shishō Saigo no Utage" (Japanese: 弥勒の師匠最後の宴)	Tomoe Aratani	Akatsuki Yamatoya	Tomoe Aratani	December 1, 2003	March 1, 2006
There has been gossips that various clergymen were killed. Miroku is told that his master Mushin is in terrible health. Inuyasha and his friends take their troublesome tasks, by cleaning the laundry and temple, ventilating the bedding, cutting the grass, and visiting the restaurant. Mushin's last wish is to taste a rare sake made of fabled sages found on a sacred mountain peak. Inuyasha and his friends are soon influenced by the toxic mist of the mountain. Miroku returns to give Mushin the sake. Mushin later falls asleep, to which Miroku first believed he died. However, Mushin explains that it was all a misunderstanding.
136	9	"A Strange Invisible Demon Appears!"; Transliteration: "Kaikitōmei Yōkai Arawaru Arawaru!" (Japanese: 怪奇透明妖怪現る現る!)	Megumi Yamamoto	Katsuhiko Chiba	Megumi Yamamoto	December 8, 2003	March 8, 2006
Inuyasha and his friends are reacquainted with the elderly demon exorcist Haori, who returns and convinces them to help her exterminate an invisible demon involved in robberies. They split up into two groups, guarding the two riches estates of the town. Sango and Shippo learn from Haori to be able to temporarily shroud themselves, but they are later seen by Miroku and Inuyasha, respectively. When the invisible demon raids the estate, it is found out that he can be formed as thin paper. He is forgiven for his actions, being told not to involve himself with humans ever again.
137	10	"An Ancestor Named Kagome"; Transliteration: "Gosenzo-sama no Namae wa Kagome" (Japanese: ご先祖の名はかごめ)	Kiyoshi Fukumoto	Tetsuko Takahashi	Kiyoshi Fukumoto	January 12, 2004	March 15, 2006
It is recognized that Akitoki Hojo, one of the ancestors of Hojo from Feudal Japan, is the husband of a woman named Kagome. While Kagome tries to deal with her unsettling feelings, Akitoki approaches Kaede in finding a solution in sealing an inherited halberd of great misfortune called the Naginata of Kenkon. Akitoki, Inuyasha, and his friends travel to a shrine atop a mountain, which will dissipate the demonic aura from the halberd. Soon after resting at a tea house, strange occurrences begin to stir, including that of boulders descending and explosives dropping. Akitoki reveals the fact that he has the Ken Blade half, while the Kon Blade half might be possessed by four ninja yōkai.
138	11	"Mountain of Demons: Survival of the Duo"; Transliteration: "Yōkai Sanga Futari no Sabaibaru" (Japanese: 妖怪山河ふたりのサバイバル)	Tomoe Aratani	Junki Takegami	Tomoe Aratani	January 19, 2004	March 22, 2006
Kagome and Akitoki are separated from Inuyasha and the others. Inuyasha confronts Hoshiyomi, the master of the ninja yōkai and owner of the Kon Blade, while Miroku, Sango, and Shippo find Kagome and Akitoki, drifted off from the waterfall. Kagome and Akitoki rest in the woods. Inuyasha questions Hoshiyomi on his purpose for obtaining the Ken Blade. The four ninja yōkai use demon puppets disguised as ancestors of Kagome's classmates, in which Kagome uses her Sacred Arrows to destroy them. However, she is captured by the four ninja yōkai.
139	12	"The Great Duel at Shoun Falls!"; Transliteration: "Shōun no Taki no Dai Kettō" (Japanese: 昇雲の滝の大決闘)	Masakazu Amiya	Junki Takegami	Masayuki Miyaji	January 26, 2004	March 29, 2006
Hoshiyomi holds Kagome captive, to unite the Ken Blade with the Kon Blade. The rest of the group have been scattered by the pentagram barrier surrounding the shrine created by Hoshiyomi. Each are encountered by one of the four ninja yōkai, proving to be worthy opponents, as the group struggle to defeat them. The bitter Hoshiyomi reveals to Kagome his own tragic close romantic relationship with a high-ranking human priestess named Tsukiyomi. He believes that by reuniting the two blades, he must kill humans to save humankind. Miroku uses his Wind Tunnel to vacuum the four ninja yōkai into the vortex. Hoshiyomi summons the two blades together to form the Naginata of Kenkon.
140	13	"Eternal Love: The Naginata of Kenkon"; Transliteration: "Eien no Omoi: Kenkon no Naginata" (Japanese: 永遠の思い 乾坤の薙刀)	Satoshi Toba	Katsuyuki Sumisawa	Toshifumi Kawase	February 2, 2004	April 5, 2006
With the Naginata of Kenkon completed, Hoshiyomi is virtually unstoppable. The spirit of Tsukiyomi returns and possesses Kagome to reason with her old lover. Hoshiyomi wanted to forge the Naginata of Kenkon in order to fight alongside Tsukiyomi, but he became possessed by the demonic influence of the weapon. Tsukiyomi sealed Hoshiyomi within the shrine and separated the halberd into two blades. However, Hoshiyomi killed Tsukiyomi. Akitoki confesses his unrequited romantic love for Kagome, defending against an attack by Hoshiyomi. Tsukiyomi gives Inuyasha and Kagome a chance to destroy the demonic halberd.
141	14	"Entei, The Demon Horse Unleashed!"; Transliteration: "Tokihanatareta Yōba Entei" (Japanese: 解き放たれた妖馬炎蹄)	Teruo Sato	Akatsuki Yamatoya	Teruo Sato	February 9, 2004	April 12, 2006
Inuyasha and his friends visit a wrecked village, where they learn that the priest of the village was killed by Kagura and The Infant. A legendary monk is known for sealing a swift demon horse known as Entei, and its demon master named Rengokuki, in the mountains. Kagura and The Infant approach the monk to attack him. However, the monk slices The Infant in half. Kagura brings both halves of The Infant to Kanna, who keeps one of the halves. Chaos ensues when the seal of Entei is broken. Moreover, due to Entei's swiftness, it is left unharmed.
142	15	"Untamed Entei and Horrible Hakudoshi"; Transliteration: "Bōsō Entei to Senritsu no Hakudōshi" (Japanese: 暴走炎蹄と戦慄の白童子)	Megumi Yamamoto	Katsuhiko Chiba	Mitsuko Kase, Toshifumi Kawase	February 16, 2004	April 19, 2006
The half of The Infant that was guarded by Kagura transforms into Hakudoshi, the eighth incarnation of Naraku. Inuyasha and his friends follow Entei and is led to Rengokuki, who has risen from his grave, but the two retreat when Inuyasha overpowers them. Rengokuki meets Kagura, who quickly declines his offer in marriage. Hakudoshi kills Rengokuki and pairs up with Entei. Inuyasha and his friends encounter Hakudoshi, while he searches the remaining jewel shards in the Netherworld, before he escapes. Kagome and Shippo are ambushed by a headless demon, in which Inuyasha deduces that Hakudoshi is responsible.
143	16	"3000 Leagues in Search of Father"; Transliteration: "Chichi o Tazunete San Senri" (Japanese: 父を訪ねて三千里)	Tomoe Aratani	Junki Takegami	Tomoe Aratani	February 23, 2004	April 26, 2006
Inuyasha and his friends met an otter yōkai named Kanta. He tells them that he seeks to restore the head of his father, after it had been sliced off by Hakudoshi. Meanwhile, Hakudoshi is seen with a handful of the heads of demons, glimpsing at the Netherworld. Kanta's headless father has entered into the village, but is scared away by the villagers, as he appears toward Sesshomaru. Kanta and Inuyasha's group find Kanta's father to reattach his head, without avail. Sesshomaru uses Tenseiga to revive Kanta's father. The Netherworld is described as a world covered in clouds of white mist and strewn with heaps of giant bones.
144	17	"Hosenki and the Last Shard"; Transliteration: "Hōsenki to Saigo no Kakera" (Japanese: 宝仙鬼と最後のかけら)	Masakazu Amiya	Katsuyuki Sumisawa	Mitsuko Kase	March 1, 2004	May 3, 2006
Inuyasha realizes that the Netherworld is the grave of his father Toga and visits Myoga, who tells him that he must go to see Hosenki in order to visit the Netherworld. After climbing a cliff, Inuyasha encounters Hakudoshi, who is aware of who Hosenki is. Inuyasha and his friends meet Hosenki, whose father has died of old age. Even though his father was the creator of the Black Pearl in Inuyasha's right eye, Hosenki is the current apprentice. Kagura tells Inuyasha's group saying that the pathway to the Netherworld is found in a gateway within the Mountain in the Realm of Fire.
145	18	"Bizarre Guards at the Border of the Afterlife"; Transliteration: "Ano Yo to no Sakai ni Iyō na Monban" (Japanese: あの世との境に異様な門番)	Satoshi Toba	Akatsuki Yamatoya	Akira Nishimori	March 8, 2004	May 10, 2006
Inuyasha and his friends head toward the Mountain in the Realm of Fire, with the Saimyōshō leading them there. After entering a cave, they find Gozu and Mezu, the giant stone statues that guard the gate of the Netherworld. However, in order to pass through the gate, one must die. Inuyasha seems vulnerable to the attacks from Gozu and Mezu. The only way to revert these two back to stone is to force the gate open by use of the Wind Scar. Kagura quickly attempts to pass through, but her demon army becomes petrified by the blinding light beyond the gate. Gozu and Mezu close the gate and revert to stone. Kagome tells the rest of the group that there is a presence of the shard of the Shikon Jewel beyond the gate. Kagura returns to Hakudoshi. Nevertheless, it is kept in mind that Hakudoshi is connected to Naraku, having possession of her heart.
146	19	"The Fiery Bird Master, Princess Abi"; Transliteration: "Kishōarai Toritsukai, Abi-Hime" (Japanese: 気性荒い鳥使い 阿毘姫)	Tatsuya Ishihara	Katsuhiko Chiba	Tomoe Aratani	March 15, 2004	May 17, 2006
It is seen that Princess Abi, a phoenix yōkai, has raided a town, in which a horde of phoenix demons drains the blood of villagers. Naraku presents himself to Princess Abi as an ally for her quest to heal her poisoned mother Queen Tekkei, wreaking havoc in order to collect the blood of humans to dilute the poison. Abi reluctantly accepts his help in the form of a trident, as it is claimed to be of use to her. A group of goblin demons have appeared in revenge of their father, yet Naraku easily defeats them and continues on his way. Abi meets Inuyasha, as her mob of phoenix demons attack a village, but she evades after realizing Naraku intended her to stop Inuyasha.
147 (Note: Episodes 147 and 148 originally aired together as a one-hour special.)	20	"The Tragic Love Song of Destiny, Part 1"; Transliteration: "Meguriau Mae no Sadame no Koi Uta, Zenpen" (Japanese: めぐり逢う前の運命恋歌)	Masakazu Amiya, Teruo Sato	Katsuyuki Sumisawa	Mitsuko Kase, Teruo Sato	April 19, 2004	May 24, 2006
The first part of a flashback is narrated by Kaede. Kaede witnesses Kikyo and Tsubaki fight a swarm of demons. The grave of Midoriko in a limestone cave reacts to the Shikon Jewel inside a slain yet resurrected Mistress Centipede. Tsubaki places a curse on Kikyo for whenever she were to deeply fall in love. Kikyo is given the duty to guard and purify the Shikon Jewel inside the shrine of the village. After meeting Inuyasha, she realizes that he wants to have the Shikon Jewel to transform from a hanyō to a full-fledged, full-blooded yōkai. She gradually falls in love with him, feeling grateful for what he has unconditionally done, and he with her. Inuyasha gives Kikyo a pearl oyster containing cosmetics as a gift, which belonged to his human mother.
148	21	"The Tragic Love Song of Destiny, Part 2"; Transliteration: "Meguriau Mae no Sadame no Koi Uta, Kōhen" (Japanese: めぐり逢う前の運命恋歌)	Masakazu Amiya, Teruo Sato	Katsuyuki Sumisawa	Mitsuko Kase, Teruo Sato	April 19, 2004	May 31, 2006
The second part of a flashback is narrated by Kaede. A bandit named Onigumo is secretly harbored inside a cave, though devious intentions are sensed, as he desires the Shikon Jewel. Tsubaki initiates a cursed assault on Kikyo, who reflects the assault. Onigumo later is consumed by a flock of demons, thus being transformed into Naraku. Kikyo is attacked by Naraku, and Inuyasha enters to rescue her. Inuyasha wants to be a human in order to be with Kikyo for the rest of his life. Naraku disguises himself as Inuyasha, shattering the shell rouge the real Inuyasha had given her as a token of their love, and as Kikyo to turn them against each other, thereby tainting the Shikon Jewel he so coveted. Naraku mortally wounds Kikyo. But before she dies, she seals Inuyasha to the Sacred Tree of Ages.
149	22	"The Single Arrow of Chaos"; Transliteration: "Haran o Yobu Ippon no Ya" (Japanese: 波乱を呼ぶ一本の矢)	Satoshi Toba	Akatsuki Yamatoya	Akira Nishimori	April 26, 2004	June 7, 2006
Another village is destroyed by Abi. Kagura searches for Sesshomaru. Kanna, with her half of The Infant, plants the child with a noblewoman for an unknown reason. Inuyasha and his friends travel with some villagers to pursue a mysterious person named Saint Hijiri, referred to as the Holy One. Hakudoshi and Kagura attack with a group of phoenix demons, buying time for Abi to wreak havoc in the village of Saint Hijiri. A Sacred Arrow is fired at Hakudoshi and Kagura, forcing them to retreat. Inuyasha and Kirara work together to trap and destroy Entei inside the mountain cave.
150	23	"The Mysterious Light that Guides the Saint"; Transliteration: "Seija o Michibiku Fushigi na Hikari" (Japanese: 聖者を導く不思議な光)	Teruo Sato	Junki Takegami	Teruo Sato	May 3, 2004	June 14, 2006
The unsettling possibility that Kikyo may be still alive arises, after having witnessed a sacred arrow being shot. She saves a group of villagers from a conflict with Abi and her group of phoenix demons. Inuyasha and his friends follow Saint Hijiri, confirming she is Kikyo. Kaede finds out that Kochō and Asuka, two female soul collectors in human form, visit Kikyo's grave to gather her remains. Inuyasha and his friends venture to the Forbidden Mountain, hoping to find Saint Hijiri. Unfortunately, Naraku's demons are an obstacle for them. Inuyasha sees an image of Kikyo before she disappears. Kagome crosses a barrier and finds the unconscious Kikyo near the waterfall.
151	24	"Kagome's Instinctive Choice"; Transliteration: "Kagome: Honnō no Sentaku" (Japanese: かごめ 本能の選択)	Megumi Yamamoto	Katsuyuki Sumisawa	Mitsuko Kase	May 10, 2004	June 21, 2006
It is Kochou and Asuka who bring Kagome to a waterfall where Kikyo is suspended. Being that she is the only person who must save Kikyo before dusk, Kagome chooses to save Kikyo, purifying her spirit of the miasma. Kagome witnesses a vision of the events leading to the death of Kikyo at the hands of Naraku, being tricked into sealing Inuyasha to the Sacred Tree. Though Kikyo has revived, she does not return her thanks for the decision Kagome made. The barrier dissipates allowing Inuyasha's group to find an irritated Kagome. Inuyasha learns from Kagome that Kikyo has been purified, urging him to find her. However, he refuses, saying that Kikyo had left them.
152	25	"Protect and Plunder!"; Transliteration: "Mamore Soshite Ubaitore!" (Japanese: 守れそして奪い取れ!)	Masakazu Amiya	Katsuhiko Chiba	Tsukasa Sunaga	May 17, 2004	June 28, 2006
Tekkei tells Abi that Saint Hijiri has become a hindrance to Naraku, also mentioning that he is avoiding a neighboring castle. Meanwhile, the noblewoman becomes suspicious of Kohaku, visiting the castle. Kagura is ordered by Hakudoshi to follow Abi to the castle. The phoenix demons attack the warlords of the castle. Kohaku is commanded by Naraku to protect The Infant. Inuyasha faces against Abi once again, as it is found out that the latter is planning to betray Naraku. Kohaku leads the noblewoman to safety as he saves her from the phoenix demons.
153	26	"The Cruel Reunion of Fate"; Transliteration: "Ummei wa Zankoku na Saikai" (Japanese: 運命は残酷な再会)	Tatsuya Ishihara	Katsuhiko Chiba	Tatsuya Ishihara	May 24, 2004	July 5, 2006
Naraku tricks Kohaku into killing the attendants and protecting The Infant. Kanna enters and takes The Infant with her after collecting the soul of the noblewoman. Abi escapes, concentrating on collecting more human blood. Kohaku recovers his memories when encountering Sango again, but his escape is aided by Kagura, who is unaware that he is finally conscious of his past. He attempts to kill himself, but resolves to kill Naraku to make amends when Kagura saves him. Sango notices that The Infant is the tie between Naraku and the castle, and Kagura realizes that The Infant is the heart of Hakudoshi. Miroku embraces Sango, while she contemplates about Kohaku and Naraku.
154	27	"The Demon Linked with the Netherworld"; Transliteration: "Ano Yo to Tsunagaru Yōkai" (Japanese: あの世とつながる妖怪)	Hirofumi Ogura	Akatsuki Yamatoya	Tsukasa Sunaga	May 31, 2004	July 12, 2006
Inuyasha is summoned by Kochō and Asuka to see Kikyo, who is aware of Naraku's intentions for crossing over to the Netherworld. She presents Inuyasha with a special arrow for Kagome, which she will know when to use it when the time is right. Inuyasha and his friends sense that Naraku has arrived at the nest of phoenix demons. Meanwhile, Tekkei reveals herself to Naraku, later devouring him. Abi summons the phoenix demons after Inuyasha's group. Naraku kills Tekkei and Abi, opening the river of blood and leading him to the Netherworld.
155	28	"The Demon Protector of the Sacred Jewel Shard!"; Transliteration: "Shikon no Kakera o Mamoru Oni" (Japanese: 四魂のかけらを守る鬼)	Teruo Sato	Junki Takegami	Teruo Sato	June 7, 2004	July 19, 2006
Inuyasha and his friends follow Naraku into the Netherworld, finding themselves at the grave of Tōga. Inuyasha hallucinates to when he was attacked by demons as a child. The late Hosenki shoots a multitude of adamant (diamond) spears at the group from the grave, where the last jewel shard is found. Hosenki prophesies that many shards of the Shikon Jewel have become tainted, whereupon he must not let anyone get a hold of the last shard of the Shikon Jewel, as that may also be tainted. Hosenki is corrupted by the jewel shard, drawing evil from the presence of tainted shards of the Shikon Jewel nearby. Inuyasha plummets into the abyss after being attacked by Hosenki.
156	29	"Final Battle at the Graveside: Sesshomaru Versus Inuyasha!"; Transliteration: "Bozen Kessen! Sesshōmaru vs InuYasha" (Japanese: 墓前決戦! 殺生丸VS犬夜叉)	Satoshi Toba	Katsuyuki Sumisawa	Mitsuko Kase	June 14, 2004	July 26, 2006
Sesshomaru is provided an alternate method of entering the Netherworld by Kagura, by which to face against Gozu and Mezu. Hosenki has been weakened from fight Inuyasha, as Naraku arrives to attempt to take the last shard of the Shikon Jewel. Inuyasha survives the fall and returns to battle Naraku, but he cannot shatter the barrier. Meanwhile, Sesshomaru uses Tenseiga to pass through the gate to the Netherworld. Naraku tells Inuyasha and his companions that their entrance to the Netherworld will not be the exit.
157	30	"Destroy Naraku with the Adamant Barrage!"; Transliteration: "Naraku o Tsuranuke Kongōsōha" (Japanese: 奈落を貫け金剛槍破)	Masakazu Amiya	Akatsuki Yamatoya	Toshifumi Kawase	June 21, 2004	August 2, 2006
Sesshomaru returns to the Netherworld and confronts Naraku. Hosenki challenges Inuyasha to slay him in order to strengthen the Tetsusaiga and acquire the power. Every time Sesshomaru attacks Naraku, the miasma affects everyone. Inuyasha chooses between eradicating the miasma and sacrificing Hosenki. It is then that Hosenski realizes that Inuyasha is selfless, giving him the power of the Adamant Barrage to shatter Naraku's barrier. Kagome uses Kikyo's special arrow, forcing Naraku to appear through Hakudoshi, being injured in the process and relinquishing the last jewel shard.
158	31	"Stampede of the Countless Demon Rats!"; Transliteration: "Daibōsō Musū no Yōkai Nezumi" (Japanese: 大暴走無数の妖怪ネズミ)	Tatsuya Ishihara	Katsuhiko Chiba	Tatsuya Ishihara	July 5, 2004	October 12, 2006
Kohaku and Kagura deduce that they must kill The Infant in order to destroy Naraku. Hakudoshi and Kohaku lure Kikyo out from hiding, by unleashing a plague of rat demons from a shrine box throughout many villages. Inuyasha and his companions realize that Naraku is after Kikyo. Meanwhile, Kikyo performs a mayose ritual to grow a special branch into a magical tree over the clouds, attracting the rat demons to climb it. Kohaku debates closing the shrine box to save lives, though that would show Naraku he is regaining his memories. Sango confronts him.
159	32	"Kohaku's Decision and Sango's Heart"; Transliteration: "Kohaku no Ketsui to Sango no Kokoro" (Japanese: 琥珀の決意と珊瑚の心)	Satoshi Toba	Katsuhiko Chiba	Akira Nishimori	July 12, 2004	October 13, 2006
While Inuyasha, Kagome, and Shippo encounter Hakudoshi at the mayose tree, Miroku and Sango discover Kohaku holding the shrine box. Hakudoshi places great slug demons on the tree to weaken it and save the rat demons. He makes his escape, as he warns that bad will come to worse if Kikyo does not reveal herself. The rat demons surround Sango and Kohaku while returning to the shrine box. Kikyo shoots a Sacred Arrow into the shrine box, and Inuyasha destroys it to kill all of the rat demons. Kohaku and Hakudoshi flee. Sango suffers mixed feelings for protecting Kohaku, confirming he had accompanied Naraku.
160	33	"The Lucky but Two-Timing Scoundrel!"; Transliteration: "Shiawase o Yobu Futamata Bōryoku Otoko" (Japanese: 幸せを呼ぶフタマタ暴力男)	Teruo Sato	Tetsuko Takahashi	Tsukasa Sunaga	July 26, 2004	October 17, 2006
Kagome returns to the present day, still pondering Inuyasha and Kikyo's relationship. Kagome receives a used bicycle as a gift from a neighbor and Inuyasha inadvertently destroys it. Her three classmates are informed that Inuyasha must choose between her and Kikyo. To make matters worse, they are intent on meeting her mysterious boyfriend, something which Kagome anticipates will be a disaster. Inuyasha mangles the bicycle further whilst repairing it. He later tries to atone by assisting Kagome's grandfather in the shed, but soon gets in trouble when Kagome sees her bicycle in shambles. The classmates finally meet Inuyasha and it goes more smoothly than Kagome expected. She later forgives him.
161	34	"Miroku's Past Mistake"; Transliteration: "Miroku-hōshi Mukashi no Ayamachi" (Japanese: 弥勒法師昔のあやまち)	Masakazu Amiya	Akatsuki Yamatoya	Mitsuko Kase	August 2, 2004	October 18, 2006
Miroku comes across a village in which he remembers meeting a young girl named Shima, who was ill two years past. He had lecherously proposed to her then, swindling her parents to buy his expensive medicinal herbs. She is being forced into a marriage with a catfish demon, despite the fact she claims to be betrothed to Miroku. It is revealed that her father unknowingly promised Shima to marry the catfish demon, due to using lake water for the medicine and regularly praying to the shrine by the lake. The whole situation causes Sango to begin to doubt Miroku's feelings for her. Shima later insists she had lost her virginity to Miroku when he first met her and Sango finds she cannot easily forgive him. The catfish kidnaps Shima and Sango as his intended mistress, but Miroku uses his Wind Tunnel to dry up the lake and defeat the yōkai. Shima reveals that she lied about being betrothed to (and sleeping with) Miroku, only to avoid marrying the catfish demon in the first place. Sango and Miroku reconcile.
162	35	"Forever with Lord Sesshomaru"; Transliteration: "Sesshōmaru-sama to Eien ni Issho" (Japanese: 殺生丸様と永遠に一緒)	Hirofumi Ogura	Katsuhiko Chiba	Akira Nishimori	August 9, 2004	October 19, 2006
Inuyasha and his friends are told that a group of demon-hunting monks are attempting to locate children abducted by an unknown yōkai. Jaken tells Sesshomaru that Rin has been enchanted by the flute music of a demon named Ongukuki. Soon after Rin is brought inside a cave full of children, the group of monks comes to vanquish Ongukuki. Rin sides with Sesshomaru over accompanying the monks.
163	36	"Kohaku, Sango and Kirara: The Secret Flower Garden"; Transliteration: "Kohaku Sango Kirara: Himitsu no Hanazono" (Japanese: 琥珀珊瑚雲母 秘密の花園)	Tatsuya Ishihara	Akatsuki Yamatoya	Tatsuya Ishihara	August 23, 2004	October 20, 2006
Kirara returns to her home village, recalling pleasant memories of times past with Sango and Kohaku. Meanwhile, Kohaku pays respects to his relatives. Kirara is soon surrounded by a bunch of demons. Kohaku saves her. Sango runs into Kagura, who reminds her that Kohaku is bound to Naraku. Kohaku shares a secret flower garden of lilies with Kirara, but flees to avoid the shame of being discovered by Sango. Sango meets Kirara, who shows her the flowers. Sango realizes Kohaku was recently there with Kirara.
164	37	"Possessed by a Parasite: Shippo, Our Worst Enemy"; Transliteration: "Saikyō no Teki: Yadori Sanagi Shippō" (Japanese: 最強の敵 宿り蛹七宝)	Megumi Yamamoto	Junki Takegami	Megumi Yamamoto	August 30, 2004	October 24, 2006
Naraku steals the Fuyouheki, an orb concealing demonic auras, from a mountain demon named Gakusaijin, who sheds parasite chrysalis demons. Meanwhile, Inuyasha and his friends purify a fox deity possessed by a parasite chrysalis demon in a town. Another parasite chrysalis demon possesses Shippo, forcing him to attack everyone. However, Inuyasha frees Shippo from the chrysalis. The parasite chrysalis demons are destroyed, upon realization that Naraku was behind all of this.
165	38	"The Ultimate Key to Defeating Naraku"; Transliteration: "Naraku o Taosu Saidai no Tegakari" (Japanese: 奈落を倒す最大の手がかり)	Satoshi Toba	Katsuhiko Chiba	Susumu Nishizawa	September 6, 2004	October 25, 2006
Inuyasha and his friends learn from Gakusaijin that Naraku has stolen the Fuyouheki from him. He gives crystals of his demonic aura to Miroku to allow Inuyasha's group to locate the stolen gem and Naraku. Kohaku encounters Kikyo, who is taken by surprise by Naraku, hiding his demonic aura with the Fuyouheki. Inuyasha and his friends arrive just in time to drive off Naraku. The Fuyouheki was stolen, because Naraku wanted to hide the demonic aura of his detached heart (The Infant). Kikyo tells Inuyasha that she must find the heart of Naraku to end this trouble. Hakudoshi creates an experimental series of soulless demons to steal the crystals from Inuyasha's group.
166 (Note: Episodes 166 and 167 originally aired together as a one-hour special.)	39	"The Bond Between Them, Use the Sacred Jewel Shard! Part 1"; Transliteration: "Futari no Kizuna - Shikon no Kakera o Tsukae! Zenpen" (Japanese: 二人の絆 四魂のかけらを使え! 前編)	Teruo Sato	Katsuyuki Sumisawa	Mitsuko Kase, Teruo Sato, Yasunao Aoki	September 13, 2004	October 26, 2006
The demon mountain Gakusaijin has been struck and destroyed by shafts of light from an unknown source. A mysterious monk named Goryomaru with a demonic arm has his child ascetic warriors slay demons and recover the bodies. This leads the group to investigate his temple in hopes of finding the Fuyouheki. They confront Goryomaru for killing Gakusaijin with his warriors. The children admit they believed all demons were evil. Kagura thinks The Infant is within the temple and commands the previously-slain demons to attack the temple. She is severely wounded by Goryomaru, falling into a nearby waterfall. Sesshomaru finds her downstream. Though he knows she has betrayed him, Naraku spares her heart in hopes of setting a trap for Inuyasha.
167	40	"The Bond Between Them, Use the Sacred Jewel Shard! Part 2"; Transliteration: "Futari no Kizuna - Shikon no Kakera o Tsukae! Kōhen" (Japanese: 二人の絆 四魂のかけらを使え! 後編)	Teruo Sato	Katsuyuki Sumisawa	Mitsuko Kase, Teruo Sato, Yasunao Aoki	September 13, 2004	October 27, 2006
Kagura tells Sesshomaru about The Infant being the possessor of the heart of Naraku, as she leaves him with a crystal connection to the Fuyouheki. Hakudoshi brings Kagura back to the temple, all to observe Goryomaru being killed. The demons were being slain and brought to the temple to amass a large amount of demonic aura, the better to mask the presence of The Infant. The group are lured into the stomach of a large stone demon, trapping them there with the intent of collecting the last jewel shard held by Kagome after they are dissolved by digestion. Kikyo encounters Kanna and The Infant. However, the soulless demon stops her attempt to kill The Infant. Inuyasha attaches the jewel shard on Tetsusaiga, causing him to transform to demon form. Kagome embraces him, subduing him long enough to purify the shard. After breaking out with the Adamant Barrage, they vow to find Naraku.
