= Inuyasha season 2 =

Season of television series

Inuyasha
- Season 2
- Cover of the North American season 2 box set released by Viz Media
- No. of episodes: 43

Release
- Original network: ytv
- Original release: October 8, 2001 – September 16, 2002

Season chronology
- ← Previous; Season 1 Next → Season 3

The second season of the anime television series Inuyasha aired on Yomiuri TV in Japan from October 8, 2001, to September 16, 2002. Based on Rumiko Takahashi's manga series, the anime series was produced by Sunrise. It continues with Inuyasha and his friends, on a journey to obtain the shards of the Shikon Jewel from the spider half-demon Naraku.

The series was licensed by Viz Media in North America. The English dub of the first season was broadcast on Cartoon Network as part of its Adult Swim programming block from September 8, 2003, through January 26, 2005.

In Japan, the second season was retroactively collected under the title Growth Arc (成長編, Seichō-hen).

Five pieces of theme music are used across this season; two opening themes and three ending themes. The opening themes are "I Am" by Hitomi for episodes 45–64 and "Owarinai Yume" (終わりない夢; "Unending Dream") by Nanase Aikawa for episodes 65–87. The three ending themes are "Dearest" by Ayumi Hamasaki for episodes 45–60, "Every Heart: Minna no Kimochi" (Every Heart -ミンナノキモチ-) by BoA for episodes 61–85 and "Shinjitsu no Uta" (真実の詩; "Song of Truth) by Do As Infinity for episodes 86–87.

== Episode list ==
| No. overall | No. in season | Title | Directed by | Written by | Storyboarded by | Original release date | English air date |
|---|---|---|---|---|---|---|---|
| 45 | 1 | "Sesshomaru Wields Tokijin"; Transliteration: "Sesshōmaru, Tōkijin o Furū" (Japanese: 殺生丸、闘鬼神を振るう) | Teruo Sato | Junki Takegami | Yasunao Aoki | October 8, 2001 | September 8, 2003 |
Kaijinbo is destroyed by his welded creation, being too nefarious for him to wield. Kagura leads Sesshomaru to Tokijin, witnessing as the demon claims his sword and wields it against Inuyasha. Before Inuyasha and his friends escape, they discover the full brunt of Tokijin held in Sesshomaru. Kagura decides that Sesshomaru will kill her master.
| 46 | 2 | "Juromaru and Kageromaru"; Transliteration: "Jūrōmaru to Kagerōmaru" (Japanese: 獣郎丸と影郎丸) | Satoshi Toba | Takashi Yamada | Mitsuko Kase | October 15, 2001 | September 9, 2003 |
While planning to avenge his tribe, Koga is ambushed by Naraku's dual incarnate detachments, Juromaru and Kageromaru. Inuyasha and Koga forcefully work together to fight back against them, and protect Kagome. Inuyasha destroys them.
| 47 | 3 | "Onigumo's Heart Still Beats Within Naraku"; Transliteration: "Naraku ni Nokoru Onigumo no Kokoro" (Japanese: 奈落に残る鬼蜘蛛の心) | Masakazu Amiya | Takashi Yamada | Eiji Yamanaka | October 22, 2001 | September 10, 2003 |
Kagome returns home, upset with Inuyasha pettily ignoring Koga, later revealed that she is just retrieving medical supplies. Naraku finds Kikyo, but realizes that he cannot kill her because he carries Onigumo's heart deep within him. In order to destroy her, he takes away the souls that she needs to remain animated and a weakened Kikyo flees, only to end up back the Sacred Tree where she imprisoned Inuyasha. Her souls are returned to her thanks to Inuyasha, but she takes a sudden leave after the two embrace, as Kagome watches behind a tree.
| 48 | 4 | "Return to the Place Where We First Met"; Transliteration: "Deatta Basho ni Kaeritai!" (Japanese: 出会った場所に帰りたい!) | Tatsuya Ishihara | Takashi Yamada | Tatsuya Ishihara | October 29, 2001 | September 11, 2003 |
After witnessing Inuyasha and Kikyo embracing each other, Kagome becomes upset and returns home again, leaving medical supplies for Miroku and Sango. She contemplates returning the jewel shards and not returning to the past. However, with some advice from her mother, Kagome reconciles with Inuyasha, knowing they will be together without Kikyo.
| 49 | 5 | "Kohaku's Lost Memory"; Transliteration: "Ushinawareta Kohaku no Kioku" (Japanese: 失われた琥珀の記憶) | Masakazu Hishida | Junki Takegami | Masakazu Hishida | November 5, 2001 | September 15, 2003 |
Sango finds Kohaku ambushed by demons. She discovers he is amnesiac of his own identity. Inuyasha is reluctant to let him join the group, proving to be a wise decision when Kagura later attacks with a horde of demons. While Inuyasha and Miroku distract her, Kagome and Kohaku escape into the forest.
| 50 | 6 | "That Unforgettable Face!"; Transliteration: "Ano Kao ga Kokoro kara Kienai" (Japanese: あの顔が心から消えない) | Megumi Yamamoto | Junki Takegami | Hitoyuki Matsui | November 12, 2001 | September 16, 2003 |
After Kagome senses Kohaku having the jewel shard, Sango intervenes and follows him. While Inuyasha and Miroku struggle as they continue their fray against Kagura, Inuyasha returns to find Kagome. While Sango follows Kohaku, she intends to atone for his actions by attempting suicide. Inuyasha prevents her from doing so, and Kagura later reveals that Kohaku requested his memories to be erased.
| 51 | 7 | "Inuyasha's Soul, Devoured"; Transliteration: "Kokoro o Kuwareta Inuyasha" (Japanese: 心を喰われた犬夜叉) | Satoshi Toba | Junki Takegami | Mitsuko Kase | November 19, 2001 | September 17, 2003 |
Sesshomaru travels to Bokusen'on, a tree yōkai responsible for the construction of the powerful inherited sheaths, who reveals the truth about Inuyasha's demonic transformation. Elsewhere, Inuyasha and his friends are led to a group of bandits who are terrorizing a nearby village. Inuyasha and Miroku encounter a moth yōkai named Gatenmaru, who traps them in a venomous cocoon, intending to own the Tetsusaiga. However, Inuyasha begins to alter to his yōkai state, once separated from the sword sealing his demonic blood.
| 52 | 8 | "The Demon's True Nature"; Transliteration: "Tomerarenai! Yōkai no Honshou" (Japanese: 止められない! 妖怪の本性) | Masakazu Amiya | Junki Takegami | Masakazu Amiya | November 26, 2001 | September 18, 2003 |
After his demonic transformation is complete, Inuyasha breaks the cocoon and destroy Gatenmaru. Though acquiring great power, he lacks sense of control over himself as he kills indiscriminately. Sesshomaru arrives and hears the words Bokusen'on said, as he gauges the power of Inuyasha. After reverting to his hanyō state, Inuyasha agonizes for what he had done to the village.
| 53 | 9 | "Father's Old Enemy: Ryukotsusei"; Transliteration: "Chichi no Shukuteki - Ryūkotsusei" (Japanese: 父の宿敵 竜骨精) | Tatsuya Ishihara | Katsuyuki Sumisawa | Tatsuya Ishihara | December 3, 2001 | April 24, 2004 |
Hoping to find a way to wield the Tetsusaiga, Totosai tells Inuyasha to find Ryūkotsusei, a dragon daiyōkai sealed away by Inuyasha's father, Toga. Inuyasha attempts to gain the strength required to lift his reforged sword, but this backfires, when Naraku awakens the dragon.
| 54 | 10 | "The Backlash Wave: Tetsusaiga's Ultimate Technique"; Transliteration: "Tessaiga no Ougi - Bakuryūha" (Japanese: 鉄砕牙の奥義 爆流破) | Megumi Yamamoto | Katsuyuki Sumisawa | Masami Hata | December 10, 2001 | May 1, 2004 |
Inuyasha becomes detached from the Tetsusaiga once again and initiates into his demonic transformation. While fighting Ryūkotsusei, Inuyasha resists his yōkai state and regains his ability to wield Tetsusaiga. Unable to use the Wind Scar, Inuyasha learns the Backlash Wave technique to destroy Ryūkotsusei.
| 55 | 11 | "The Stone Flower and Shippo's First Love"; Transliteration: "Ishi no Hana to Shippō no Hatsukoi" (Japanese: 石の花と七宝の初恋) | Satoshi Toba | Tetsuko Takahashi | Mitsuko Kase | December 17, 2001 | May 8, 2004 |
Arriving at another village, Shippo falls in love with a young girl named Satsuki, who believes her late brother will return to her someday, as she shows that she possesses the jewel shard, not realizing that it is actually a quartz fragment. Satsuki's brother has incredibly returned to her, but Shippo notices that he is really a lizard demon. Shippo and Satsuki escape, while he faces off against and easily defeats the lizard demon.
| 56 | 12 | "Temptress in the Mist"; Transliteration: "Kiri no Oku ni Bijo no Yūwaku" (Japanese: 霧の奥に美女の誘惑) | Kiyoshi Fukumoto | Katsuhiko Chiba | Kiyoshi Fukumoto | January 14, 2002 | May 15, 2004 |
Miroku and Sango are asked to defeat a demon disguised as a beautiful princess, who has been luring men away from a village and stealing their youth. They become separated while entering through a spirit shield infused in a forest. While Miroku comes across the princess who welcomes him into her mansion, Sango comes across the men who have aged dramatically due to having their life energy sucked out. Though it seems Miroku will be the next victim, he manages to resist seduction and free the spirit of the princess from the coyote demon that stole it, allowing her to pass on. Sango kills the demon, with the damaged Hiraikotsu having a crack.
| 57 | 13 | "Fateful Night in Togenkyo, Part I"; Transliteration: "Subete wa Tōgenkyō no Yoru ni (Zenpen)" (Japanese: すべては桃源郷の夜に 前編) | Masakazu Amiya | Katsuyuki Sumisawa | Eiji Yamanaka | January 21, 2002 | May 22, 2004 |
Sango leaves to take a notice of three days in order to repair the boomerang. The others venture into the mountains to find Ninmenka, a demonic peach tree bearing the fruit of human faces. Inuyasha is ambushed by Tokajin, a sage responsible for nourishing Ninmenka with human souls, being sucked into a bottle gourd. Meanwhile, Kagome, Miroku, and Shippo are brought to the miniature village of Togenkyo, where they learn that the villagers are kept there to become sages.
| 58 | 14 | "Fateful Night in Togenkyo, Part II"; Transliteration: "Subete wa Tōgenkyō no Yoru ni (Kōhen)" (Japanese: すべては桃源郷の夜に 後編) | Tatsuya Ishihara | Katsuyuki Sumisawa | Tatsuya Ishihara | January 28, 2002 | May 29, 2004 |
While breaking free from the gourd, Inuyasha becomes a human on the night of the new moon. While Miroku and Shippo escape from the village, Kagome is captured by Tokajin. Inuyasha escorts Kagome to Ninmenka, but they are caught by Tokajin. Kagome uses her bow and arrow to remove the jewel shard from Tokajin, and he is devoured by Ninmenka. As dawn arises, Inuyasha kills Ninmenka.
| 59 | 15 | "The Beautiful Sister Apprentices"; Transliteration: "Bishōjo Shimai no Deshiiri Shigan" (Japanese: 美少女姉妹の弟子入り志願) | Satoshi Toba | Junki Takegami | Mitsuko Kase | February 4, 2002 | June 5, 2004 |
With her weapon fixed, Sango finds herself delayed by two sisters, Serina and Suzuna, seeking to become her apprentices. Nevertheless, when the duo steal equipment for weapons that had yet to be purified, they are unaware that there are hundreds of demons that would be attracted by the demonic aura of the materials. Sango rescues the two from the demons, and the others arrive to help them.
| 60 | 16 | "The 50 Year-Old Curse of the Dark Priestess"; Transliteration: "Kuro Miko Gojūnen no Noroi" (Japanese: 黒巫女 五十年の呪い) | Hirofumi Ogura | Katsuhiko Chiba | Toshiya Niidome | February 11, 2002 | June 12, 2004 |
Kagura summons the dark priestess Tsubaki in the presence of Naraku, who offers the jewel shard for her. In exchange, Tsubaki curses Kagome using her snakelike demon puppet Shikigami. As the jewel shards are tainted black and are merged within her, Kagome is possessed by Tsubaki. Though she is forced to kill Inuyasha, Kagome tries to resist Tsubaki's power.
| 61 | 17 | "Kikyo and the Dark Priestess"; Transliteration: "Arawareta Kikyō to Shikigami Tsukai" (Japanese: 現れた桔梗と式神使い) | Kiyoshi Fukumoto | Junki Takegami | Kiyoshi Fukumoto | February 18, 2002 | June 19, 2004 |
As Tsubaki controls Kagome, she is interrupted by Kikyo, who passes through her barrier with ease. Meanwhile, Inuyasha takes a weakened Kagome to the whereabouts of Tsubaki, sensing the tainted fragment of the Shikon Jewel and breaking the barrier. Kikyo warns Tsubaki not to underestimate her reincarnation. Kikyo promises that Tsubaki will be killed only if Inuyasha interferes. So using Kagome as collateral, Tsubaki threatens Inuyasha from using his sword.
| 62 | 18 | "Tsubaki's Unrelenting Evil Spell"; Transliteration: "Sokoshirenu Tsubaki no Jubaku" (Japanese: 底知れぬ椿の呪縛) | Masakazu Amiya | Katsuyuki Sumisawa | Masakazu Amiya | March 4, 2002 | June 26, 2004 |
While Inuyasha is distracted by a demon summoned by Tsubaki, Kagome struggles to break the curse. She dreams of her life if she had never met Inuyasha, waking up after seeing an illusion of Kikyo. As Tsubaki diverts Inuyasha, Miroku, and Sango with a raid of summoned demons, she sends Shikigami after Kagome. However, Kagome reflects the snake at Tsubaki like Kikyo did fifty years ago.
| 63 | 19 | "The Red and White Priestesses"; Transliteration: "Ikute o Habamu Kōhaku Miko" (Japanese: 行く手を阻む紅白巫女) | Tatsuya Ishihara | Katsuhiko Chiba | Tatsuya Ishihara | March 11, 2002 | July 3, 2004 |
While keeping the incomplete jewel at the shrine, Tsubaki tricks Momiji and Botan into fighting Inuyasha. The two steal and use the hair strands from Inuyasha and Kagome to create giant dolls in their image and likeness. However, Inuyasha destroys the dolls.
| 64 | 20 | "Giant Ogre of the Forbidden Tower"; Transliteration: "Tahōtō no Kyodai na Oni" (Japanese: 多宝塔の巨大な鬼) | Megumi Yamamoto | Katsuhiko Chiba | Megumi Yamamoto | March 18, 2002 | July 10, 2004 |
Inuyasha, Kagome, Sango, and Kaede pace to the shrine, in search of Tsubaki. Elsewhere, Miroku and Shippo tell Botan and Momiji about Tsubaki. It is seen that Tsubaki has freed an oni from the forbidden tower of the shrine, absorbing it to gain its power. Tsubaki's newly found ogreish abilities are proven significant, until Inuyasha unleashes the Backlash Wave. Tsubaki loses her eternal beauty when the fragment of the Shikon Jewel is taken away from her.
| 65 | 21 | "Farewell Days of My Youth"; Transliteration: "Saraba Seishun no Hibi" (Japanese: さらば青春の日々) | Satoshi Toba | Junki Takegami | Mitsuko Kase | April 8, 2002 | July 17, 2004 |
Inuyasha and his friends are invited to a banquet, after facilely defeating a demon in a town. Oddly enough, Myoga the flea yōkai servant returns, as series of strange occurrences ensue. Sango, Miroku and Inuyasha are all possessed one after another, experiencing unorthodox behavior. Shoga, a female flea yōkai, is responsible for this, all in the desire to marry Myoga.
| 66 | 22 | "Naraku's Barrier - Kagura's Decision"; Transliteration: "Naraku no Kekkai - Kagura no Kesshin" (Japanese: 奈落の結界 神楽の決心) | Kiyoshi Fukumoto | Tetsuko Takahashi | Kiyoshi Fukumoto | April 15, 2002 | July 24, 2004 |
Naraku's barrier becomes weakened for Inuyasha and Koga to detect him. Kanna tells Kagura that Koga is approaching. Kagura entraps Koga in a whirlwind of skeletons. Kagura unsuccessfully removes two jewel shards from Koga, albeit he tries to overtake her. Kagura decides whether or not she should betray her master. She goes to Sesshomaru, proposing the offer of the obtained shards for the Shikon Jewel in exchange for Naraku.
| 67 | 23 | "The Howling Wind of Betrayal"; Transliteration: "Fukiareru Uragiri no Kaze" (Japanese: 吹き荒れる裏切りの風) | Masakazu Amiya | Tetsuko Takahashi | Susumu Nishizawa | April 22, 2002 | July 31, 2004 |
After Sesshomaru declines her notion, Kagura departs in disappointment. Koga finds Kagura, trying to requite for the jewel shards, only to end up defeated once more. Before the sun rises, Kagura discovers that Inuyasha reverts into a human form on the night of the new moon. Kagura does not inform Naraku of this, as it is observed that he is a hanyō, undergoing a transformation.
| 68 | 24 | "Shippo Gets an Angry Challenge"; Transliteration: "Shippō e Ikari no Chosenjō" (Japanese: 七宝へ怒りの挑戦状) | Yasuhiro Takemoto | Katsuyuki Sumisawa | Yasuhiro Takemoto | May 6, 2002 | August 7, 2004 |
Shippo receives a letter from Soten, the last surviving member of the thunder yōkai tribe. He is soon captured by him, much to his dismay. Miroku and Sango fall into a trap set up by Koryu, Soten's dragon yōkai partner. However, the plan backfires with Inuyasha and Kagome, as Koryu is declared vulnerable against them. After enlightening Soten with his art, Shippo duels against her, with a handful of crayons as the prize. After they are given by Shippo, Soten develops a crush for him.
| 69 | 25 | "Terror of the Faceless Man"; Transliteration: "Kao no Nai Otoko no Kyōfu" (Japanese: 顔のない男の恐怖) | Teruo Sato | Katsuhiko Chiba | Eiji Yamanaka | May 13, 2002 | August 14, 2004 |
Kagome returns to the present day for academic studies and social life. Meanwhile, Naraku summons Onigumo, but it unexpectedly takes on a life of its own as another incarnation. It steals the face and name of a monk named Muso and wreaks havoc across the countryside. Muso is uncertain of his true desires, before ambushing Kagome.
| 70 | 26 | "Onigumo's Memory Restored"; Transliteration: "Yomigaetta Onigumo no Kioku" (Japanese: よみがえった鬼蜘蛛の記憶) | Megumi Yamamoto | Katsuhiko Chiba | Toshiya Niidome | May 20, 2002 | August 21, 2004 |
Inuyasha attacks Muso, forcing him to retreat. While Inuyasha, Miroku, Sango, and Shippo encounter Kagura, Kagome and Kaede investigate the cave, where they learn that Muso had headed there. Muso's memory has been restored, recalling the birth of Naraku.
| 71 | 27 | "Three-Sided Battle to the Death"; Transliteration: "Mitsudomoe no Shitō no Hate" (Japanese: 三つ巴の死闘の果て) | Satoshi Toba | Katsuhiko Chiba | Masami Hata | May 27, 2002 | August 28, 2004 |
Muso continues to regenerate himself each time Inuyasha attacks him. Naraku discovers that while he can bring himself to kill Kikyo, he is weak without Onigumo's presence within him. When Inuyasha finds Naraku, the two begin to fight. As Muso pierces the body of Naraku, this enables the latter to reabsorb the former. This exposes the startling secret that Naraku is a hanyō, but different from that of Inuyasha.
| 72 | 28 | "Totosai's Rigid Training"; Transliteration: "Tōtōsai no Kimyō na Shiren" (Japanese: 刀々斎の珍妙な試練) | Kiyoshi Fukumoto | Junki Takegami | Kiyoshi Fukumoto | June 3, 2002 | September 4, 2004 |
Inuyasha visits Totosai in hopes of finding a method to break barriers. Given the opportunity to help prepare a bath, Totosai indoctrinates Inuyasha to accompany Bunza, a young lynx yōkai messenger, in fetching some water and chopping firewood. They later save Bunza's father, trapped in a barrier made by Nanafushi, a mantis demon who invaded the village of the lynx yōkai tribe.
| 73 | 29 | "Shiori's Family and Inuyasha's Feelings"; Transliteration: "Shiori Ayako to Aitsu no Kimochi" (Japanese: 紫織母子とアイツの気持ち) | Tatsuya Ishihara | Akatsuki Yamatoya | Tatsuya Ishihara | June 10, 2002 | September 11, 2004 |
Myoga offers Inuyasha a method so that he can gain the power to break barriers. This involves traveling to a village in order to defeat and absorb the blood of a bat demon known for creating impenetrable barriers. It is explained that a bat hanyō named Shiori was given to her grandfather Taigokumaru, the leader of the bat yōkai clan, to ensure peace between the opposing sides. Inuyasha is left conflicted. Shiori is a half-demon just like him and an innocent little girl, but he needs to gain the power to break barriers.
| 74 | 30 | "The Red Tetsusaiga Breaks the Barrier!"; Transliteration: "Kekkai Yaburu Akai Tessaiga" (Japanese: 結界破る赤い鉄砕牙) | Masakazu Amiya | Akatsuki Yamatoya | Masami Hata | June 17, 2002 | September 18, 2004 |
Taigokumaru invades the village, while relying on the guardian powers of Shiori to shield himself, using the heirloom red orb called the Blood Coral Crystal. Inuyasha empathizes with Shiori, recalling of his gruesome childhood past. When Shiori discovers Taigokumaru is responsible for the death of her father Tsukuyomaru, she provides Inuyasha the means to annihilate her grandfather, by act of the Backlash Wave, and acquiring the ability to break barriers, by destroying the crystal.
| 75 | 31 | "The Plot of the Panther Devas"; Transliteration: "Hyōneko Shitennō no Inbou" (Japanese: 豹猫四天王の陰謀) | Teruo Sato | Katsuhiko Chiba | Eiji Yamanaka | June 24, 2002 | September 25, 2004 |
A group of panther demons follow Kagome for the jewel shard. Sesshomaru encounters Toran, the ice panther deva, who reminds him of the defeat of the panther king in the hands of Toga. Inuyasha, Miroku, and Sango encounter Karan and Shuran, the fire and lightning panther devas, who distract the three to allow Shunran, the floral panther deva, to capture Kagome. They meet up and fight at the castle of the panther devas, and seeking revenge for the panther king.
| 76 | 32 | "Target: Sesshomaru and Inuyasha"; Transliteration: "Tāgetto wa Sesshōmaru to Inuyasha" (Japanese: 標的は殺生丸と犬夜叉!) | Megumi Yamamoto | Katsuhiko Chiba | Megumi Yamamoto | July 1, 2002 | October 2, 2004 |
Inuyasha breaks into the barrier of the panther yōkai tribe using Barrier Shattering, an attack shattering barriers when the Tetsusaiga glows red. Sesshomaru appears to tell Inuyasha to heed his warning of retreat. It is revealed how and why the panther devas are seeking revenge originating fifty years ago. Everyone becomes divided and is separately confronted by the panther devas.
| 77 | 33 | "The Panther Tribe and the Two Swords of the Fang"; Transliteration: "Hyōnekozoku to Futatsu no Kiba no Ken" (Japanese: 豹猫族とふたつの牙の剣) | Satoshi Toba | Katsuhiko Chiba | Masami Hata | July 8, 2002 | October 9, 2004 |
The panther devas return to the castle to begin the resurrection of the panther king, in when a large crowd of villagers are captured to be sacrificed. Inuyasha arrives and frees everyone. However, the panther king devours Karan, Shuran, and Shunran, in order to revive himself. Putting their feelings aside, Sesshomaru uses the Tenseiga to restore the lives of the panther devas, and Inuyasha kills the panther king.
| 78 | 34 | "Only You, Sango"; Transliteration: "Sango Mezashite Onrī Yū" (Japanese: 珊瑚目指してオンリーユー) | Tatsuya Ishihara | Akatsuki Yamatoya | Tatsuya Ishihara | July 15, 2002 | October 16, 2004 |
Sango is reacquainted with Kuranosuke Takeda, lord of the Takeda clan, after having first met six years ago. Kuranosuke asks that Sango must slay a bear demon haunting his palace, and to accept his marriage proposal. Miroku becomes exceedingly envious of Sango. However, he tells her that she must choose, and when questioned by Kagome he says that he thinks Sango should have a chance. Sango is caught off guard when battling the bear demon. However, Miroku defeats it through the ritual of exorcism. Sango refuses to marry Kuranosuke and leaves the castle with the group.
| 79 | 35 | "Jaken's Plan to Steal Tetsusaiga"; Transliteration: "Jaken no Tessaiga bun Torisakusen" (Japanese: 邪見の鉄砕牙ブン取り作戦) | Kiyoshi Fukumoto | Tetsuko Takahashi | Kiyoshi Fukumoto | July 22, 2002 | January 10, 2005 |
Jaken plans to steal the Tetsusaiga from Inuyasha to prove his worth for Sesshomaru, recalling how the two first chanced upon. After many failed attempts, including being a sword blacksmith and a hot springs resort manager, Jaken steals the sword, but is caught by Inuyasha. Jaken abandons the mission, before Kagura kidnaps Rin.
| 80 | 36 | "Sesshomaru and the Abducted Rin"; Transliteration: "Sesshōmaru to Sarawareta Rin" (Japanese: 殺生丸とさらわれたりん) | Masakazu Amiya | Junki Takegami | Hitoyuki Matsui | July 29, 2002 | January 11, 2005 |
Sesshomaru receives an ultimatum from Naraku, who threatens the safety of Rin for Inuyasha, to which he calmly enters in his castle. Sesshomaru confronts Naraku, but is unaware he plans to absorb him. Kagome senses Kohaku accompanying Rin. Inuyasha is blocked off by Kagura, who halfheartedly tried to fight him, since she desires Inuyasha to kill Naraku and free her from his grasp.
| 81 | 37 | "Vanishing Point; Naraku Disappears"; Transliteration: "Tachikireru Naraku no Yukue" (Japanese: 断ち切れる奈落の行方) | Teruo Sato | Junki Takegami | Teruo Sato | August 5, 2002 | January 12, 2005 |
Sesshomaru is trapped by Naraku, but is saved by Inuyasha. After Naraku abandons the castle, Kohaku tries to kill Rin, but she is saved by Sesshomaru.
| 82 | 38 | "Gap Between the Ages"; Transliteration: "Gendai to Sengoku no Hazama" (Japanese: 現代と戦国のはざま) | Megumi Yamamoto | Akatsuki Yamatoya | Megumi Yamamoto | August 12, 2002 | January 17, 2005 |
While Inuyasha, Miroku, and Sango investigate the castle, Kagome studies for the next exam. Inuyasha impatiently heads to the present day. Chaos ensues as Kagome struggles to catch up with her studies, while Inuyasha tries to adjust to the present time. It is reported that Inuyasha apprehended a bank robber and rescued a girl from an apartment fire.
| 83 | 39 | "The Female Wolf-Demon and the Lunar Rainbow Promise"; Transliteration: "Onna Yōrōzoku to Gekkō no Yakusoku" (Japanese: 女妖狼族と月虹の約束) | Tatsuya Ishihara | Tetsuko Takahashi | Tatsuya Ishihara | August 19, 2002 | January 18, 2005 |
Ayame, the granddaughter of northern wolf yōkai tribe leader, searches for Koga, who is needed to unite the northern and eastern tribes, once proposing to marry her during childhood. When a mouth incarnation of Naraku goes on a rampage, Koga decides to take off with Kagome to protect her, but runs into Ayame. It is explained how Koga once saved Ayame from the Birds of Paradise, while promising to marry her during the night of the lunar rainbow.
| 84 | 40 | "Koga's Bride-To-Be"; Transliteration: "Chōsoku no Hanayome Kōho" (Japanese: 超速の花嫁候補) | Satoshi Toba | Tetsuko Takahashi | Eiji Yamanaka | August 26, 2002 | January 19, 2005 |
When Naraku's mouth incarnation arrives, Koga saves Kagome and Ayame. When Inuyasha and the others arrive, the mouth incarnation reveals that Naraku abandoned it in the castle. It explodes when Koga and Ayame are consumed, caused by the jewel shards. Though, he finally remembers having proposed to Ayame, Koga disregards ever recalling that night.
| 85 | 41 | "The Evil Within Demon's Head Castle"; Transliteration: "Jaki ga Michiru Oni no Kubi Jō" (Japanese: 邪気が満ちる鬼の首城) | Kiyoshi Fukumoto | Junki Takegami | Kiyoshi Fukumoto | September 2, 2002 | January 24, 2005 |
Inuyasha and his friends meet an old woman named Haori, who introduces herself as a demon exorcist. She tells them that a head of an oni haunting a nearby bourg, after being risen from its grave within a neighboring castle. When the head of the oni comes out, Miroku deduces it is an illusion. Inuyasha believes that the lord of the castle may have been possessed. Miroku goes with the princess to the basement of the castle to observe the skeletons of the monks and priestess, failing to kill the demon.
| 86 | 42 | "Secret of the Possessed Princess"; Transliteration: "Yorishiro no Hime no Himitsu" (Japanese: 依り代の姫の秘密) | Masakazu Amiya | Akatsuki Yamatoya | Hitoyuki Matsui | September 9, 2002 | January 25, 2005 |
Inuyasha realizes that the demon lord is a phantasm. Meanwhile, Sango and Haori find out that the demon princess, who had temporarily paralyzed Miroku, is the head of the oni. Elsewhere, Kagome and Shippo stumble upon the body of the real princess, being the host of the head of the oni. Inuyasha and Miroku defeat the head of the oni.
| 87 | 43 | "Kikyo's Lonely Journey"; Transliteration: "Meguru Kikyō no Kodoku na Tabiji" (Japanese: めぐる桔梗の孤独な旅路) | Teruo Sato | Katsuyuki Sumisawa | Eiji Yamanaka | September 16, 2002 | January 26, 2005 |
Kikyo meets a bandit named Rasetsu, who explains that he was a criminal fifty years ago. He unveils that Onigumo sent him to strike Kikyo and steal the Shikon Jewel. However, Inuyasha gouged out his right eye, causing him to immolate Onigumo in revenge. An eye incarnation of Naraku, also abandoned in the castle, is destroyed by Kikyo. Rasetsu requests Kikyo to bury his lock of hair.
