= Inuyasha season 1 =

Season of television series

Inuyasha
- Season 1
- Cover of the North American season 1 box set released by Viz Media
- No. of episodes: 44

Release
- Original network: ytv
- Original release: October 16, 2000 – September 17, 2001

Season chronology
- Next → Season 2

The first season of the anime television series Inuyasha aired on Yomiuri TV in Japan from October 16, 2000, to September 17, 2001. Based on Rumiko Takahashi's manga series, the episodes were produced by Sunrise and directed by Masashi Ikeda. The series follows a half dog demon Inuyasha, high school girl Kagome Higurashi, a fox demon Shippo, lecherous monk Miroku, and surviving demon slayer Sango, on a journey to obtain the fragments of the shattered Jewel of Four Souls, a powerful jewel hidden inside Kagome's body, and keep the shards from being used for evil.

The series was licensed by Viz Media in North America. The English dub of the first season was broadcast on Cartoon Network as part of its Adult Swim programming block from August 31, 2002, to September 4, 2003, and reran on its Toonami block beginning on November 3, 2012.

In Japan, the first season was retroactively collected under the title Encounter Arc (出会い編, Deai-hen).

Five pieces of theme music are used across this season; two opening themes and three ending themes. The opening themes are "Change the World" by V6 for episodes 1–34 and "I Am" by Hitomi for episodes 35–44. Streaming services in the United States typically use an instrumental opening theme for "Change the World" due to licensing issues. The three ending themes are "My Will" by Japanese girl group Dream for episodes 1–20, "Fukai Mori" (深い森; "Deep Forest") by Do As Infinity for episodes 20–41 and "Dearest" by Ayumi Hamasaki for episodes 42–44.

== Episode list ==
No. overall	No. in season	Title	Directed by	Written by	Storyboarded by	Original release date	English air date
1	1	"The Girl Who Overcame Time... and the Boy Who Was Just Overcome"; Transliteration: "Toki o Koeta Shōjo to Fūinsareta Shōnen" (Japanese: 時代を越えた少女と封印された少年)	Masashi Ikeda	Masashi Ikeda	Masashi Ikeda	October 16, 2000	August 31, 2002
Kagome Higurashi lives in the present day of 1997 Japan. She finds her cat in the shrine on her fifteenth birthday, and discovers the female centipede demon Mistress Centipede dragging her down the shrine well. Kagome ends up transported back in time to a village in Feudal Japan. She meets the Priestess Kaede, who senses Kagome is the reincarnation of her sister Kikyo. Mistress Centipede senses Kagome hiding the legendary Shikon Jewel, a crystal gem of unbelievable mystical power. Kagome meets the golden-eyed, silver-haired half dog-demon, half-human boy Inuyasha. She discovers him nailed to a huge tree by Kikyo's sealing arrow. Kagome removes it to free Inuyasha from the tree. Before Inuyasha defeats Mistress Centipede, Kaede sees a orbicular lavender-colored jewel extracted from Kagome and identify as the Jewel of Four Souls bestowed onto her.
2	2	"Seekers of the Sacred Jewel"; Transliteration: "Shikon no Tama o Nerau Monotachi" (Japanese: 四魂の玉を狙う者たち)	Takashi Ikehata	Masashi Ikeda	Masashi Ikeda	October 23, 2000	September 7, 2002
Inuyasha tries to steal the Shikon Jewel and become a full-fledged dog yōkai, but Kaede casts the spiritual Beads of Subjugation onto Inuyasha for Kagome to comically control him with a single spoken word. When a crow demon steals the jewel, Kagome shoots the crow with an arrow, causing the jewel to scatter into many fragments around feudal Japan.
3	3	"Down the Rabbit Hole and Back Again"; Transliteration: "Honekui no Ido kara Tadaima!" (Japanese: 骨喰いの井戸からただいまっ！)	Tatsuya Ishihara	Katsuyuki Sumisawa	Tatsuya Ishihara	October 30, 2000	September 14, 2002
With the Shikon Jewel shattered, each fragment has the ability to further develop, and drastically enhance the abilities of a yōkai and grant any wish. Inuyasha fumes at the thought of having to collect the scattered pieces of the jewel, making his wish impossible. Kagome falls into the Bone Eater's Well, after being ambushed by Yura of the Hair, who steals the jewel shard. Meanwhile, Inuyasha and Kaede avoid the human marionettes controlled by Yura.
4	4	"Yura of the Demon-Hair"; Transliteration: "Sakasagami no Yōma Yūra" (Japanese: 逆髪の妖魔 結羅)	Megumi Yamamoto	Katsuyuki Sumisawa	Toshifumi Kawase	November 6, 2000	September 21, 2002
Inuyasha and Kagome head to the well, and return to Feudal Japan. Yura traps Inuyasha with the web of hair and skulls. However, Kagome saves Inuyasha and kills Yura, destroying a red skull.
5	5	"Aristocratic Assassin, Sesshomaru"; Transliteration: "Senritsu no Kikōshi Sesshōmaru" (Japanese: 戦慄の貴公子 殺生丸)	Hitoyuki Matsui	Katsuhiko Chiba	Hitoyuki Matsui	November 13, 2000	September 28, 2002
Inuyasha's flea yōkai servant Myoga arrives, in which Kagome learns the truth about the deaths of Toga and Izayoi, Inuyasha's real parents. Inuyasha's half-brother, Sesshomaru and his imp yōkai servant Jaken, take the revived Izayoi captive. Izayoi breaks free, and takes Inuyasha and Kagome to a spirit world, where it is recognized that Izayoi's face does not reflect in water.
6	6	"Tetsusaiga, the Phantom Sword"; Transliteration: "Bukimi na Yōtō Tessaiga" (Japanese: 不気味な妖刀 鉄砕牙)	Masakazu Hishida	Katsuhiko Chiba	Akira Nishimori	November 20, 2000	October 5, 2002
Kagome realizes that the spirit world is an illusion in order to find out the location of Toga's tomb. Before Inuyasha gets absorbed by the Mu-onna, Kagome frees him, but Sesshomaru learns the tomb was hidden in a Black Pearl deep within Inuyasha's right eye. Sesshomaru activates a portal from the Black Pearl, and Inuyasha and Kagome follow him. Inside the tomb therein lies Tetsusaiga, Toga's legendary sword, for which Inuyasha fights Sesshomaru for it.
7	7	"Showdown! Inuyasha vs. Sesshomaru!"; Transliteration: "Gekitaiketsu! Sesshōmaru tai Tessaiga!" (Japanese: 激対決！殺生丸VS鉄砕牙!!)	Kunihiro Mori, Satoshi Toba	Katsuhiko Chiba	Masashi Ikeda	November 27, 2000	October 12, 2002
Kagome removes Tetsusaiga from the altar and gives it to Inuyasha. After Sesshomaru reminds Inuyasha that the latter is a half-breed yōkai, the former reverts to his dog yōkai form to test the power of the sword. Inuyasha defeats Sesshomaru, forcing him to retreat. Inuyasha and Kagome return to the village, with the Black Pearl safely returned to Inuyasha's right eye.
8	8	"The Toad Who Would Be Prince"; Transliteration: "Tono Yōkai Tsukumo no Gama" (Japanese: 殿様妖怪 九十九の蝦蟇)	Takashi Ikehata	Takashi Yamada	Toshifumi Kawase	December 4, 2000	October 19, 2002
Inuyasha and Kagome meet a young samurai named Amari Nobunaga. He leads them to a castle where a vengeful toad yōkai has possessed the reigning prince. The three infiltrate the castle in order to rescue the captivated Princess Tsuyu. The toad yōkai prince, who has a shard of the Shikon Jewel within him, attacks them and takes Tsuyu to a room full of souls. However, the others free Tsuyu. Inuyasha and Kagome case out the toad yōkai, and retrieve the jewel shard.
9	9	"Enter Shippo... Plus, the Amazing Thunder Brothers!"; Transliteration: "Shippō Tōjō! Raijū Kyōdai Hiten Manten" (Japanese: 七宝登場！雷獣兄弟 飛天満天!!)	Megumi Yamamoto	Katsuyuki Sumisawa	Akira Nishimori	December 11, 2000	October 26, 2002
Inuyasha and Kagome meet Shippo, a mischievous orphaned fox yōkai, who seeks to take the jewel shard, after his father was killed by Hiten and Manten of the Thunder Brothers. When Manten kidnaps Kagome, Inuyasha and Shippo head to the mountains.
10	10	"Phantom Showdown: The Thunder Brothers vs. Tetsusaiga"; Transliteration: "Yōtō Gekitotsu! Raigekijin tai Tessaiga" (Japanese: 妖刀激突！雷撃刃VS鉄砕牙!!)	Hitoyuki Matsui	Katsuyuki Sumisawa	Hitoyuki Matsui	December 18, 2000	November 2, 2002
Shippo uses his illusory tricks to save Kagome. When Hiten fuses with Manten for two jewel shards to increase twofold, Inuyasha summons Tetsusaiga with the sheath to kill them.
11	11	"Terror of the Ancient Noh Mask"; Transliteration: "Gendai ni Yomigaeru Noroi no Nōmen" (Japanese: 現代によみがえる呪いの能面)	Tatsuya Ishihara	Masashi Ikeda	Masashi Ikeda	January 15, 2001	November 9, 2002
As Kagome returns to the present day, her grandfather is attacked by an ancient Noh mask when it brakes the talismans, in which he is admitted to a hospital. The Noh mask attempts to gain a body of its own. Kagome confronts the Noh mask, and her brother Sota summons Inuyasha from the well.
12	12	"The Soul Piper and the Mischievous Little Soul"; Transliteration: "Tatari Mokke to Chiisana Akuryō" (Japanese: タタリモッケと小さな悪霊)	Kaoru Suzuki	Tetsuko Takahashi	Susumu Nishizawa	January 22, 2001	November 16, 2002
Inuyasha spots a benevolent yōkai called the Tatarimokke, leading the souls of dead children with its tune. It is harmless when its eyes remain closed, but it becomes fearsome when its eyes are opened. Kagome meets the vengeful spirit of Mayu, the sister of Sota's comatose friend Satoru. Mayu is a likely candidate to be taken to the underworld, unless she forgives her mother and brother.
13	13	"The Mystery of the New Moon and the Black-Haired Inuyasha"; Transliteration: "Shingetsu no Nazo! Kurogami no Inuyasha" (Japanese: 新月の謎 黒髪の犬夜叉)	Masakazu Hishida	Katsuhiko Chiba	Tatsuya Ishihara	January 29, 2001	November 23, 2002
Inuyasha, Kagome, and Shippo save a girl named Nazuna from a group of spider heads. The priest of a nearby shrine allows the three to stay, with the protection of sutras. After being attacked by spider heads, Kagome and Shippo soon discover Inuyasha reverting into a human on the phase of the new moon. It is learned that the priest is disguised as a spider head, as Inuyasha is vulnerable against him. At sunrise, Inuyasha defeats the spider head.
14	14	"Kikyo's Stolen Ashes"; Transliteration: "Nusumareta Kikyō no Reikotsu" (Japanese: 盗まれた桔梗の霊骨)	Megumi Yamamoto	Akinori Endo	Takashi Ikehata	February 5, 2001	November 30, 2002
At midnight, Inuyasha glimpses at an ogress sorceress demon named Urasue, who carries the scent of graveyard soil and the blood of Kaede. Inuyasha, Kagome, and Shippo head to the village, and learn that Urasue has stole Kikyo's remains. They vow to assist Kaede in recovering the ashes thereupon. Meanwhile, Urasue has reawakened the body of Kikyo, but is disappointed to deduce her soul has already been reincarnated.
15	15	"Return of the Tragic Priestess, Kikyo"; Transliteration: "Hiun no Miko Kikyō Fukkatsu" (Japanese: 悲運の巫女 桔梗復活)	Tatsuya Ishihara	Akinori Endo	Tatsuya Ishihara, Toshifumi Kawase	February 12, 2001	December 7, 2002
Urasue kidnaps Kagome in order to resurrect Kikyo. The conveyed soul exits from Kagome and enters into Kikyo, when Inuyasha unwittingly calls out her name. The confused and revived Kikyo blames Inuyasha for her death. When Inuyasha cries out in pain, Kagome calls the soul back into her body, leaving Kikyo wallowing in hatred. After Kikyo falls off a cliff, Inuyasha recalls to the time of the betrayal fifty years ago.
16	16	"Mystical Hand of the Amorous Monk, Miroku"; Transliteration: "Migi Te ni Kazaana Furyō Hōshi Miroku" (Japanese: 右手に風穴 不良法師 弥勒)	Hitoyuki Matsui	Takashi Yamada	Hitoyuki Matsui	February 19, 2001	December 7, 2002
Miroku, a lecherous monk, searches the jewel shards. He encounters Kagome and discreetly steals them. Inuyasha trails him to an okiya in hopes to retrieve them. Miroku unleashes the void of the Wind Tunnel cursed in his right hand, but Kagome prevents him from doing so. Miroku reveals the source of his curse, which was inflicted upon by the yōkai Naraku, who has been after the jewel for fifty years.
17	17	"Cursed Ink of the Hell-Painter"; Transliteration: "Jigoku Eshi no Kegareta Sumi" (Japanese: 地獄絵師の汚れた墨)	Kaoru Suzuki	Katsuyuki Sumisawa	Akira Nishimori	February 26, 2001	December 14, 2002
The castle's exiled artist has been denied his unique skills as a warlord. Miroku notices ink demons surrounding the castle, in which they are paintings created by the artist. It is unveiled that the jewel shard is responsible for bringing these paintings to life. Miroku uses the Wind Tunnel to draw the ink demons into the void. They retrieve the jewel shard, before the artist escapes. However the ink demons kill the artist, due to his malevolent ambitions.
18	18	"Naraku and Sesshomaru Join Forces"; Transliteration: "Te o Kunda Naraku to Sesshōmaru" (Japanese: 手を組んだ奈落と殺生丸)	Masakazu Hishida	Ai Ota	Kazuhisa Takenouchi	March 5, 2001	December 14, 2002
Sesshomaru receives a human arm and the jewel shard from Naraku that can be embedded in it and attempting to wield Tetsusaiga. Sesshomaru unsuccessfully steals Tetsusaiga and destroys the demons from the mountain. While Miroku defends using the Wind Tunnel, Sessomaru uses the demonic wasps known as the Saimyōshō to poison Miroku.
19	19	"Go Home to Your Own Time, Kagome!"; Transliteration: "Kaere, Kagome! Omae no Jidai ni" (Japanese: 帰れ、かごめ！お前の時代に)	Akira Nishimori	Ai Ota	Akira Nishimori	March 12, 2001	December 21, 2002
Kagome tries to remove Sesshomaru's human arm, but she gets hurt in the process. Inuyasha tells Shippo and Miroku to send Kagome back home. Though Inuyasha retrieves Tetsusaiga, he falls unconscious. Sesshomaru discards his severed arm and Naraku retrieves the shard. Inuyasha forces Kagome back to her own era, takes the jewel shards and blocks the well for her safety.
20	20	"Despicable Villain! The Mystery of Onigumo!"; Transliteration: "Asamashiki Yatō, Onigumo no Nazo" (Japanese: あさましき野盗 鬼蜘蛛の謎)	Tatsuya Ishihara	Takashi Yamada	Tatsuya Ishihara	March 19, 2001	December 21, 2002
At a nearby cave, Kaede tells Inuyasha and Miroku, that she and Kikyo once cared for a badly burnt thief named Onigumo. However, he ended up lusting for Kikyo and allowed his body to be consumed by the yōkai from his desire for her, thus created who is to be known as Naraku. He soon unleashes a corrupted Rōyakan upon the three, in as much as Inuyasha is in a weakened state. Rōyakan returns for a second encounter, with a jewel shard embedded in his head, causing panic for the three.
21 (Note: Episodes 21 and 22 originally aired together as a one-hour special on Japanese television titled 奈落の真実に迫る桔梗の魂 前編 / 後編 (Naraku's True Identity; Kikyō's Wandering Soul (Part 1 / Part 2)). The broadcast version of Episode 21 is 5 minutes longer than the standard version. Also included in Japanese DVD and some european DVD release, but not Blu-ray release.)	21	"Naraku's True Identity Unveiled"; Transliteration: "Gojū Nen Mae no Shinjitsu; Naraku no Shōtai" (Japanese: 50年前の真実 奈落の正体)	Satoshi Toba	Takashi Yamada	Takashi Ikehata	April 9, 2001	December 28, 2002
Kagome plans to accompany her high school classmate Hojo, but cancels on short notice. Miroku and Kaede attempt to protect Inuyasha from Rōyakan. Meanwhile, Shippo heads to the well with the jewel shard and helps Kagome return to the feudal era. Naraku reveals he is responsible for corrupting Kikyo and Inuyasha, in order to get the Shikon Jewel.
22	22	"A Wicked Smile; Kikyo's Wandering Soul"; Transliteration: "Ashiki Bishō; Samayō Kikyō no Tamashii" (Japanese: 悪しき微笑 さまよう桔梗の魂)	Megumi Yamamoto	Akinori Endo	Masami Hata	April 9, 2001	December 28, 2002
Kikyo, who survived the fall from the cliff after visiting Inuyasha, currently stays in the village. A monk named Seikai immediately senses her supernaturalism, later discovering that she must steal the souls of the dying to maintain her presence in the world. Meanwhile, Inuyasha, Kagome, Shippo, and Miroku investigate a neighboring castle concerning absence of feminine souls, which inevitably leads them to Kikyo.
23	23	"Kagome's Voice and Kikyo's Kiss"; Transliteration: "Kagome no Koe to Kikyō no Kuchizuke" (Japanese: かごめの声と桔梗の口づけ)	Kaoru Suzuki	Akinori Endo	Masami Hata	April 16, 2001	January 14, 2003
Inuyasha sets off to find Kikyo, but Kagome ends up finding the shrine maiden first, trying to explain the true circumstances which led to her death. When Inuyasha sees Kikyo, she embraces him in tears. Kikyo, no longer caring about how she died, still cannot overcome her hatred of Inuyasha and decides to drag him to the underworld to join her in death. However, Inuyasha hears Kagome's voice and breaks free from Kikyo's binding spell. Kikyo visits Kaede in order to confirm Naraku's aspirations.
24	24	"Enter Sango the Demon Slayer"; Transliteration: "Yōkaitaijiya, Sango Tōjō!" (Japanese: 妖怪退治屋 珊瑚登場！)	Akira Nishimori	Katsuyuki Sumisawa	Akira Nishimori	April 23, 2001	January 15, 2003
Sango is a demon slayer who collects shards of the Shikon Jewel as payment. She is the sole survivor of an arachnid attack engineered by Naraku to destroy her village of demon slayers and acquire the jewel shards, by which her younger brother Kohaku is manipulated by Naraku. Sango unknowingly believes from Naraku that Inuyasha is responsible for the attack.
25	25	"Naraku's Insidious Plot"; Transliteration: "Naraku no Bōryaku o Uchi Yabure!" (Japanese: 奈落の謀略をうち破れ！)	Hitoyuki Matsui	Katsuyuki Sumisawa	Hitoyuki Matsui	May 7, 2001	January 16, 2003
Naraku tricks Sango into fighting Inuyasha. Miroku and Kirara, Sango's pet yōkai cat, follow Naraku, but the truth is soon revealed when Naraku summons a demon puppet in his place.
26	26	"Secret of the Jewel of Four Souls Revealed"; Transliteration: "Tsui ni Akasareta Shikon no Himitsu" (Japanese: ついに明かされた四魂の秘密)	Tatsuya Ishihara	Katsuyuki Sumisawa	Masami Hata	May 14, 2001	January 17, 2003
Sango discovers Inuyasha, Kagome, Shippo, and Miroku, making the grave near the village. She uncovers the secret to passing through the barrier to a cave near her village, where the shrine maiden Midoriko created the Shikon Jewel, can purify the souls of the yōkai. It is explained when a person contains the four spirits (courage, friendship, wisdom, and love), they unite to form a really strong and powerful balance within the soul that can be used for either good or evil.
27	27	"The Lake of the Evil Water God"; Transliteration: "Suijin ga Shihaisuru Yami no Mizuumi" (Japanese: 水神が支配する闇の湖)	Megumi Yamamoto	Tetsuko Takahashi	Masami Hata	May 21, 2001	January 21, 2003
Inuyasha, Kagome, Miroku, Sango, and Shippo head to town, where the sacrifice of the firstborns are mercifully offered to an arrogant water god. The four are hired by the village headman's son, Taromaru, to save his friend, Suekichi. Inuyasha, Kagome, and Shippo destroy the false water god, while Miroku and Sango search and free the true one. They arrive and help the others.
28	28	"Miroku Falls Into a Dangerous Trap"; Transliteration: "Kakokuna Wana ni Kakatta Miroku" (Japanese: 過酷な罠にかかった弥勒)	Masakazu Hishida	Takashi Yamada	Akira Nishimori	May 28, 2001	January 22, 2003
Tricked by a praying mantis demon disguised as a beautiful princess, Miroku ends up damaging the edge of his Wind Tunnel while fighting her. He is to return to his master Mushin to have his right hand healed. Trouble arises when his master ends up possessed by a worm demon and tries to kill him. After Miroku is found by the others, it is discovered that a demon worm charmer is controlling Mushin. After all the demons have been cast out, the demon worm charmer dies and Mushin is no longer possessed.
29	29	"Sango's Suffering and Kohaku's Life"; Transliteration: "Sango no Kunō to Kohaku no Inochi" (Japanese: 珊瑚の苦悩と琥珀の命)	Masashi Abe	Akinori Endo	Akira Nishimori	June 4, 2001	January 23, 2003
Naraku revives Kohaku with the jewel shard, although his memory was erased, considering the trauma being unbearable, being ordered to attack Inuyasha. Sango follows Kohaku, passing through a spirit shield embedded in a forest, to which Naraku is encountered. Using Kohaku as leverage, Naraku offers to let him live forever if Sango steals Tetsusaiga.
30	30	"Tetsusaiga Is Stolen! Showdown at Naraku's Castle!"; Transliteration: "Nusumareta Tessaiga Taiketsu Naraku no Shiro!" (Japanese: 盗まれた鉄砕牙 対決 奈落の城!)	Tatsuya Ishihara	Akinori Endo	Tatsuya Ishihara	June 11, 2001	January 24, 2003
As Inuyasha and Kohaku engage in combat, Sango forcefully steals Tetsusaiga and absconds away. Sango discovers Naraku taking the form of Kagewaki Hitomi, the lord whose father hired them the fateful night her kin were killed. She proves to be no match against Kohaku, seeing that she still cares for him. It is until Kagome arrives to help Sango.
31	31	"Jinenji, Kind Yet Sad"; Transliteration: "Kokoroyasashiki Aishū no Jinenji" (Japanese: 心優しき哀愁の地念児)	Akira Nishimori	Katsuyuki Sumisawa	Mitsuko Kase	June 18, 2001	January 28, 2003
Inuyasha and Kagome go to a town to find medicinal herbs for Sango and Kirara. The two end up meeting the gentle giant horse hanyō Jinenji, who is falsely accused of killing the townspeople. Inuyasha sets off to find the source of the real yōkai, and Kagome tries to improve Jinenji's self-esteem. Touched by her kindness, Jinenji saves Kagome from the real yōkai and gains respect for the townspeople.
32	32	"Kikyo and Inuyasha, Into the Miasma"; Transliteration: "Jaki ni Ochita Kikyō to Inuyasha" (Japanese: 邪気に落ちた桔梗と犬夜叉)	Satoshi Toba	Ai Ota	Masami Hata	June 25, 2001	January 29, 2003
Naraku learns that Kikyo is still alive. Meanwhile, Inuyasha, Kagome, Miroku, Sango, and Shippo, investigative yōkai appearances in the mountains, before Kikyo arrives soon after. The yōkai are battled against, notwithstanding the souls of the yōkai defeated merge with Naraku. Having gained a new body, Naraku kidnaps Kikyo.
33	33	"Kikyo, Captured by Naraku"; Transliteration: "Torawareta Kikyō to Naraku" (Japanese: 囚われた桔梗と奈落)	Masakazu Hishida	Ai Ota	Masami Hata	July 2, 2001	January 30, 2003
Inuyasha, Kagome, Miroku, Sango, and Shippo, fall into a trap set up by Naraku so they will all be killed by illusions of their deepest fears. Kagome, immune to the spell, finds Kikyo, who steals the jewel shards and gives it to Naraku.
34	34	"Tetsusaiga and Tenseiga"; Transliteration: "Tenseiga to Tessaiga" (Japanese: 天生牙と鉄砕牙)	Tatsuya Ishihara	Takashi Yamada	Hitoyuki Matsui	July 9, 2001	January 31, 2003
Sesshomaru, dissatisfied with Tenseiga, wishes to have the old, absent-minded blacksmith Totosai forge another weapon for him. The unwilling Totosai has Inuyasha defend him, causing the brothers to fight. Totosai reveals the heritage of Sesshomaru's sword, before creating a diversion to allow Inuyasha and his friends to escape. Soon after leaving, Totosai is attacked by Sesshomaru. However, Inuyasha saves Totosai and discovers Sesshomaru wearing a dragon claw.
35	35	"The True Owner of the Great Sword!"; Transliteration: "Meitō ga Erabu Shin no Tsukai Te" (Japanese: 名刀が選ぶ真の使い手)	Takehiro Nakayama	Takashi Yamada	Akira Nishimori	July 16, 2001	February 3, 2003
As Inuyasha and Sesshomaru fight for the possession of Tetsusaiga, they discover the unexpected power and strength of their respective inheritances. After the fight, an injured Sesshomaru meets the young orphan Rin. Koga, the leader of the eastern wolf yōkai tribe, searches for the jewel shards at the village. Sesshomaru uses Tenseiga to revive Rin when she is killed by wolves.
36	36	"Kagome Kidnapped by Koga, the Wolf Demon!"; Transliteration: "Kagome Ryakudatsu! Chōsoku no Yōrō Kōga!" (Japanese: かごめ略奪! 超速の妖狼 鋼牙)	Yasunao Aoki	Katsuyuki Sumisawa	Mitsuko Kase	July 23, 2001	February 4, 2003
Inuyasha and his friends meet Koga, who takes an instant dislike for Inuyasha. Koga sees Inuyasha perfecting the Wind Scar of the Tetsusaiga, an attack gained by sensing the fissure between two demonic forces. Koga kidnaps Kagome and Shippo, while attacking the others. He instructs Kagome to use her ability to see the jewel shards, in order to destroy the demonic Birds of Paradise attacking the clan.
37	37	"The Man Who Fell in Love with Kagome!"; Transliteration: "Kagome ni Horeta Aitsu" (Japanese: かごめに惚れたあいつ)	Satoshi Toba	Katsuyuki Sumisawa	Mitsuko Kase	July 30, 2001	August 25, 2003
As Inuyasha, Mikoku, and Sango rush to save Kagome and Shippo, Kagome agrees to help Koga on the condition that he will not let the wolves kill Shippo. Kagome locates the jewel shard in a Siamese Bird of Paradise. When Inuyasha arrives to help, Koga audaciously declares his love for Kagome and incites Inuyasha's jealousy. However, Inuyasha puts it aside and kills the Siamese Bird of Paradise.
38	38	"Two Hearts, One Mind"; Transliteration: "Hanarete Kayou Futari no Kimochi" (Japanese: はなれて通うふたりの気持ち)	Takahiro Okada	Takashi Yamada	Yasunao Aoki	August 6, 2001	August 26, 2003
After another heated argument with Inuyasha, Kagome returns home and restock her medical supplies. She discovers that her friends are worried that she may lose Hojo to another girl. Meanwhile, Shippo attempts to explain why Inuyasha and Kagome are having an altercation against each other to Kaede, who offers some sound advice for Inuyasha.
39	39	"Trapped in a Duel to the Death!"; Transliteration: "Shikumareta Shitō" (Japanese: 仕組まれた死闘)	Tatsuya Ishihara	Katsuyuki Sumisawa	Masami Hata	August 13, 2001	August 27, 2003
Naraku, using the Saimyōshō, takes a poisoned shard of the Shikon Jewel from the forehead of a bear yōkai. During the raid against Naraku's castle, the wind sorceress Kagura kills Koga's wolf yōkai tribe and lures the latter with the poisoned shard. Koga inadvertently blames Inuyasha for their deaths. Miroku and Sango enter the castle to fight another demon puppet sent by Naraku.
40	40	"The Deadly Trap of Kagura the Wind Sorceress!"; Transliteration: "Kazetsukai Kagura no Yōennaru Wana" (Japanese: 風使い神楽の妖艶なる罠)	Masakazu Hishida	Katsuyuki Sumisawa	Masami Hata	August 20, 2001	August 28, 2003
Inuyasha struggles to reason with Koga, until Kagura wounds Koga. It is unfortunate that the Wind Scar is useless against Kagura, being that she can control the winds, until Kagome steps in to purify the air with her sacred arrows. As Kagura retreats, Inuyasha notices a familiar spider shaped scar on her back. Kagome uses her sacred arrow to remove the poisonous shard from Koga's arm.
41	41	"Kagura's Dance and Kanna's Mirror"; Transliteration: "Kagura no Mai to Kanna no Kagami" (Japanese: 神楽の舞と神無の鏡)	Satoshi Toba	Akinori Endo	Yasunao Aoki	August 27, 2001	September 1, 2003
Miroku is unexpectedly reunited with Koharu, a young girl who fell in love with him and has run away from her village when her master's son came to her with unwanted advances. Meanwhile, Kagura and Kanna, being the incarnated detachments of Naraku, wreak havoc upon the same village, by stealing souls from the villagers and controlling their bodies. Kanna finds that Kagome's spirit overwhelms the entrapment within her mirror, deciding to leave her weakened instead.
42	42	"The Wind Scar Fails"; Transliteration: "Yaburareta Kaze no Kizu" (Japanese: 破られた風の傷)	Naoki Hishikawa	Akinori Endo	Eiji Yamanaka	September 3, 2001	September 2, 2003
Inuyasha discovers Kagura using her wind to reanimate the soulless villagers. However, when he decides to use the Wind Scar against her, he gets a nasty surprise and finds Kanna using her mirror to reflect his attack. Naraku tells Inuyasha that Kikyo herself willingly gave him the jewel shards, which she took from Kagome. Kagome shoots a sacred arrow at Kanna, causing all souls to scatter from the mirror and separately return to the villagers.
43	43	"Tetsusaiga Breaks"; Transliteration: "Tsui ni Oreta Tessaiga!" (Japanese: ついに折れた鉄砕牙!)	Tatsuya Ishihara	Tetsuko Takahashi	Akira Nishimori	September 10, 2001	September 3, 2003
Inuyasha confronts Kikyo as to her motivations for giving Naraku the stolen jewel shards, and she explains it being part of her plan to destroy Naraku. Meanwhile, Naraku has unleashed Goshinki, a large horned ogre yōkai with the ability of telepathy, revealed to be his third incarnation. As Goshinki breaks the Tetsusaiga, Inuyasha transforms into a full-breed dog yōkai.
44	44	"Kaijinbo's Evil Sword"; Transliteration: "Kaijinbō no Jaaku na Tsurugi" (Japanese: 灰刃坊の邪悪な剣)	Masakazu Amiya	Takashi Yamada	Tatsuya Ishihara	September 17, 2001	September 4, 2003
After finding the corpse of Goshinki and detecting the scent of Inuyasha, Sesshomaru journeys to Kaijinbo, the rogue blacksmith and former disciple of Totosai, in order to commission a sword made from Goshinki's head. Ironically, on the same night Kaijinbo arrives, possessed and wielding the Tokijin as his newest creation, Inuyasha has transformed into a human form, rendering him defenseless. Totosai appears and gives Inuyasha his sword, however being too heavy for him to lift.
