= Inuyasha season 3 =

Season of television series

Inuyasha
- Season 3
- Cover of the North American season 3 box set released by Viz Media
- No. of episodes: 40

Release
- Original network: ytv
- Original release: October 14, 2002 – September 15, 2003

Season chronology
- ← Previous; Season 2 Next → Season 4

The third season of the anime television series Inuyasha aired on Yomiuri TV in Japan from October 14, 2002, to September 15, 2003. Based on Rumiko Takahashi's manga series, the anime series was produced by Sunrise. It continues with Inuyasha and his friends, on a journey to obtain the shards of the Shikon Jewel from the spider half-demon Naraku.

The series was licensed by Viz Media in North America. The English dub of the third season was broadcast on Cartoon Network as part of its Adult Swim programming block from January 31, 2005, to January 4, 2006.

In Japan, the third season was retroactively collected under the title Band of Seven Arc (七人隊編, Shichinintai-hen).

Four pieces of theme music are used across this season; two opening and ending themes. The opening themes are "Owarinai Yume" (終わりない夢; "Unending Dream") by Nanase Aikawa for episodes 88–95 and "Grip!" by Every Little Thing for episodes 96–127. The ending themes are "Shinjitsu no Uta" (真実の詩; "Song of Truth) by Do As Infinity for episodes 88–108 and "Itazura na Kiss" (イタズラなKISS; "Mischievous Kiss") by Day After Tomorrow for episodes 109–127.

== Episode list ==
| No. overall | No. in season | Title | Directed by | Written by | Storyboarded by | Original release date | English air date |
|---|---|---|---|---|---|---|---|
| 88 | 1 | "The Three Sprites of the Monkey God"; Transliteration: "Sarugamisama no San Seirei" (Japanese: 猿神さまの三精霊) | Tatsuya Ishihara | Katsuhiko Chiba | Tatsuya Ishihara | October 14, 2002 | January 31, 2005 |
Three mischievous monkey sprites are said to be ravaging the crops of a village. It is revealed that they are finding the deity enshrined in the village. They have sealed an inconvenient stone effigy to Inuyasha as leverage until the stone of the monkey deity is located. The monkey deity awakens, and the seal of the stone effigy has been released from Inuyasha.
| 89 | 2 | "Nursing Battle of the Rival Lovers"; Transliteration: "Aitsu to Kare Omimai Taiketsu" (Japanese: アイツと彼のお見舞い対決) | Megumi Yamamoto | Katsuhiko Chiba | Megumi Yamamoto | October 21, 2002 | February 1, 2005 |
Kagome becomes ill and returns to her time, in order to recover herself. Her schoolmates visit and console her. Inuyasha collects ingredients from the dwellings of many demons. Kagome studies for the high school entrance exams, minding the fact that she is still sick. Inuyasha concocts a very odd medicinal cure (taught by Izayoi) using the ingredients. Kagome drinks it to relieve her common cold.
| 90 | 3 | "Sota's Brave Confession of Love"; Transliteration: "Omoikitta Sōta no Kokuhaku" (Japanese: 思いきった草太の告白) | Satoshi Toba | Akatsuki Yamatoya | Hitoyuki Matsui | October 28, 2002 | February 2, 2005 |
Inuyasha and Kagome notice Sota is lovesick. Sota turns to Inuyasha for advice to impress his love interest Hitomi. Sota fails to confess his love for Hitomi. Inuyasha tries to build up Sota's confidence. As Inuyasha and Kagome watch from afar, Sota willingly asks Hitomi to be his girlfriend, which she accepts.
| 91 | 4 | "The Suspicious Faith Healer and the Black Kirara"; Transliteration: "Ayashii Kitōshi to Kuroi Kirara" (Japanese: 怪しい祈祷師と黒い雲母) | Teruo Sato | Junki Takegami | Teruo Sato | November 4, 2002 | February 7, 2005 |
Kuroro, a two-tailed demon cat, is exiled from the village by a faith healer and rat demon Tesso. Shippo meets and discovers a girl named Koume taking away Kirara, being mistaken as Kuroro. Shippo, Koume, and Kuroro reunite with the others, and Inuyasha defeats Tesso.
| 92 | 5 | "Plot of the Walking Dead"; Transliteration: "Fukkatsu Shita Monotachi no Yabō" (Japanese: 復活した者たちの野望) | Masakazu Amiya | Tetsuko Takahashi | Masami Hata | November 18, 2002 | February 8, 2005 |
Enju is a freelance potter responsible for creating the clay soldiers and Kawaramaru is a warrior accountable for commanding them. They were resurrected by their "mother", Urasue, the ogress sorceress demon. After Inuyasha and his friends defeat Kawaramaru and his army of clay soldiers, Enju receives a chance to live.
| 93 | 6 | "The Mysterious, Lecherous Monk"; Transliteration: "Shutsubotsu Suru Nazo no Sukebe Hōshi" (Japanese: 出没する謎の助平法師) | Tatsuya Ishihara | Akatsuki Yamatoya | Tatsuya Ishihara | November 25, 2002 | February 9, 2005 |
Inuyasha's group see that Miroku innocently stirs up trouble with the villagers within each village they travel across, as he has been framed for being a fake and a flirter with the girls. Apparently a monk named Miroku, being described as mysterious and perverted, is seen wandering the countryside. They figure out that Hachi, Miroku's raccoon dog slave, is the culprit, as they all are faced with a weasel demon. He is the one who has been imitating Miroku all this time. Upon defeating the weasel demon, Miroku makes sure Hachi will not repeat his action.
| 94 | 7 | "The Sacred Jewel Maker Part I"; Transliteration: "Shikon no Tama o Tsukuru Mono (Zenpen)" (Japanese: 四魂の玉を造る者 前編) | Satoshi Toba | Katsuhiko Chiba | Toshiya Niidome | December 2, 2002 | February 14, 2005 |
A young male scholar named Izumo explains to Inuyasha and his friends that a snake demon called Orochidayu has created false Shikon Jewels to share with many demons. They discuss about the origins of the four souls constructing the Shikon Jewel. When arriving to an abandoned town, an adolescent boy unravels that a group of demon captured his parents the night before. Orochidayu later shows up with the group of demons implanted with false Shikon Jewels, as Inuyasha and his friends strive in trying to conquer them.
| 95 | 8 | "The Sacred Jewel Maker Part II"; Transliteration: "Shikon no Tama o Tsukuru Mono (Kōhen)" (Japanese: 四魂の玉を造る者 後編) | Masakazu Amiya | Katsuhiko Chiba | Akira Nishimori | December 9, 2002 | February 15, 2005 |
Inuyasha and his friends become scattered due to a fierce attack from the group of demons. Kagome startlingly discovers that Izumo becomes a hanyō named Gyu-oh at nightfall, who intends to create a true Shikon Jewel by using Kagome's spiritual abilities and the souls of her friends. When dawn approaches, Gyu-oh reverts into a human form and dies from the jewel's toxin.
| 96 | 9 | "Jaken Falls Ill"; Transliteration: "Byōki ni Natta Ano Jaken" (Japanese: 病気になったあの邪見) | Kiyoshi Fukumoto | Katsuyuki Sumisawa | Kiyoshi Fukumoto | January 13, 2003 | February 16, 2005 |
While Inuyasha and his friends plan to visit Jinenji, Jaken is ambushed and poisoned by the Saimyōshō. He tells Rin to find a medical herb at Jinenji's village before sunset. The weakened Saimyōshō leads Sesshomaru to the abandoned village. Rin finds the herb atop a mountain cliff and Sesshomaru rescues her. As dusk arrives, Jaken consumes the herb for recovery.
| 97 | 10 | "Kirara Come Home!"; Transliteration: "Kaette Konai Kirara" (Japanese: 帰ってこない雲母) | Megumi Yamamoto | Akatsuki Yamatoya | Megumi Yamamoto | January 20, 2003 | February 21, 2005 |
Kirara mysteriously disappears one night, causing Inuyasha's group to worry. Shippo unpleasantly examines that the others are to blame for using Kirara for their personal interests. They all encounter a baboon demon in a nearby forest, suspecting that he consumed Kirara. Sango recalls to when Kirara was first introduced into her life. This motivates her in defeating the baboon demon. It is later found out that Kirara was with Myoga, who was asked to carry back a whetstone for Tetsusaiga. Shippo was told to tell the others but he was so sleepy that he forgot to tell, so got a lot of glares from the others that he apparently knew but pointed fingers at them, Inuyasha punishes Shippo.
| 98 | 11 | "Kikyo and Kagome: Alone in the Cave"; Transliteration: "Dōkutsu ni wa Kikyō to Kagome no Futari Dake" (Japanese: 洞窟には桔梗とかごめの二人だけ) | Tatsuya Ishihara | Akatsuki Yamatoya | Tatsuya Ishihara | January 27, 2003 | February 22, 2005 |
Kikyo and Kagome are trapped in the belly of a demon cloaked as a cavern that devours the spiritual energy of priestesses. With her knowledge and experience, Kikyo leads Kagome to the heart of the demon, and sacrifices her energy to merge Kagome's shards of the Shikon Jewel into one. With her latent potential, Kagome kills the demon to set herself and Kikyo free. Note: This is the last episode for hand-drawn cel animation.
| 99 | 12 | "Koga and Sesshomaru, A Dangerous Encounter"; Transliteration: "Kōga to Sesshōmaru, Kiken Sōgū" (Japanese: 鋼牙と殺生丸 危険な遭遇) | Teruo Sato | Katsuhiko Chiba | Toshiya Niidome | February 3, 2003 | February 23, 2005 |
Ginta and Hakkaku, the left-hand and right-hand men of Koga, meet Sesshomaru, Jaken, and Rin, unaware that Koga was responsible for Rin's traumatic experience with wolves. While Inuyasha and Koga quarrel over Kagome's food, Ginta and Hakkaku ask Kagome about Sesshomaru. The two attempt with little success to prevent Koga and Sesshomaru from meeting. When the two run upon each other, they mutually team up to save Rin from the demons. Note: This is the first episode for digital animation.
| 100 | 13 | "The Truth Behind the Nightmare: Battle in the Forest of Sorrow"; Transliteration: "Akumu no Shinjitsu: Nageki no Muri no Tatakai" (Japanese: 悪夢の真実 嘆きの森の戦い) | Megumi Yamamoto | Katsuyuki Sumisawa | Megumi Yamamoto | February 10, 2003 | February 28, 2005 |
Upon encountering Garamaru, the brother of the moth demon Gatenmaru, Inuyasha's friends are encased within cocoons. This would transform them into moth demons as they are plagued by their worst fears. However, Inuyasha prevents Garamaru from devouring the souls of his friends, and reaches into their dreams, urging them to overcome their anxieties.
| 101 | 14 | "The Snow from Seven Years Past"; Transliteration: "Are Kara Shichinen Me no Nagori Yuki" (Japanese: あれから七年目のなごり雪) | Kiyoshi Fukumoto | Junki Takegami | Kiyoshi Fukumoto | February 17, 2003 | March 1, 2005 |
Miroku recalls being saved in his youth by a beautiful woman named Koyuki during a blizzard seven years ago. It is reported that male villagers have been allured by a snow maiden. Miroku comes across Koyuki, who claims to have bore his children as she guides him to a secluded house. Inuyasha, Kagome, and Shippo find Sango deep within the snowy plains, where she tells them about Miroku. They are encountered by Koyuki, as she summons and merges with a snow demon, by which is defeated.
| 102 | 15 | "Assault on the Wolf-Demon Tribe!"; Transliteration: "Bōrei ni Ozowareta Yōrōzoku" (Japanese: 亡霊に襲われた妖狼族) | Satoshi Toba | Tetsuko Takahashi | Akira Nishimori | February 24, 2003 | May 28, 2005 |
The northern wolf yōkai tribe is attacked by the monstrous Kyokotsu, the first of the Band of Seven. It is revealed that Kohaku has resurrected Kyokotsu, using one of seven jewel shards. He assigns him to find more of them, in which he finds the perfect opportunity when he runs into Koga, who has returned to save the eastern wolf yōkai tribe. Koga kills Kyokotsu and retrieves the jewel shard.
| 103 | 16 | "The Band of Seven, Resurrected!"; Transliteration: "Yomigaetta Shichinintai" (Japanese: よみがえった七人隊) | Tatsuya Ishihara | Junki Takegami | Tatsuya Ishihara | March 3, 2003 | June 4, 2005 |
The Band of Seven are foretold as mercenaries who killed the warlords in the plains ten years ago. They were later executed by the soldiers in the mountains. Sango senses Kohaku in a forest nearby, only to recede, as the presence of Mukotsu, another member of the Band of Seven, is sensed. Meanwhile, Inuyasha meets another resurrected member of the Band of Seven, Jakotsu.
| 104 | 17 | "The Stealthy Poison Master: Mukotsu!"; Transliteration: "Shinobiyoru Doku Tsukai: Mukotsu" (Japanese: しのびよる毒使い 霧骨) | Masakazu Amiya | Katsuhiko Chiba | Masami Hata | March 10, 2003 | June 11, 2005 |
The fight between Inuyasha and Jakotsu ends abruptly, when Mukotsu releases a stinging poison. Mukotsu soon paralyzes Kagome with poison, seeking for the jewel shards. While Shippo retrieves Inuyasha from Jakotsu, Miroku, and Sango fall unconscious. An immune Sesshomaru kills Mukotsu, removing the jewel shard. Inuyasha and Shippo later arrive to carry Kagome, Miroku, and Sango to a safe place.
| 105 | 18 | "The Ghastly Steel Machine!"; Transliteration: "Bukimi na Hagane no Jūsōbi" (Japanese: 不気味な鋼の重装備) | Teruo Sato | Akatsuki Yamatoya | Tatsuya Ishihara | March 17, 2003 | June 18, 2005 |
The mechanical Ginkotsu, another member of the Band of Seven, appears and wreaks havoc. Shippo takes Kagome, Miroku, and Sango away from the area, where Inuyasha fights Ginkotsu. Shippo takes them to a nearby temple. When Kagome awakes from her comatose state, she discovers that the monk Renkotsu has the jewel shard, and being a member for the Band of Seven. Inuyasha rushes to the temple after leaving Ginkotsu.
| 106 | 19 | "Kagome, Miroku, and Sango: Desperate Situation!"; Transliteration: "Kagome, Miroku, Sango, Zettai Zetsumei" (Japanese: かごめ、弥勒、珊瑚、絶体絶命) | Megumi Yamamoto | Junki Takegami | Megumi Yamamoto | April 14, 2003 | June 25, 2005 |
Inuyasha arrives at the temple, where his friends are bewitchingly bedridden, sensing the scent of graveyard dirt. While the supposedly destroyed Ginkotsu soon returns to distract Inuyasha, Renkotsu sets the temple ablaze and helps Ginkotsu. Shippo protects the others from the fire, before Inuyasha arrives.
| 107 | 20 | "Inuyasha Shows His Tears For The First Time"; Transliteration: "Hajimete Miseru Inuyasha no Namida" (Japanese: 初めてみせる犬夜叉の涙) | Kiyoshi Fukumoto | Katsuyuki Sumisawa | Kiyoshi Fukumoto | April 21, 2003 | July 2, 2005 |
Inuyasha is devastated that his friends almost died because of his weakness. Koga appears to Inuyasha in order to rebuke him for not protecting his friends. Myoga saves Kagome, Miroku, and Sango, by sucking the poison from their blood. Meanwhile, Kikyo has found a kind doctor caring for local children named Suikotsu, who has the jewel shard and had anxiety.
| 108 | 21 | "The Secret of the Pure Light"; Transliteration: "Kegarenaki Hikari no Himitsu" (Japanese: けがれなき光の秘密) | Tatsuya Ishihara | Katsuyuki Sumisawa | Masami Hata | April 28, 2003 | July 9, 2005 |
Kikyo attempts to solve the mystery surrounding the nature of Suikotsu. Renkotsu, Jakotsu, and Ginkotsu attack the town. Renkotsu traps Inuyasha and his friends on a net of fire, while Jakotsu and Ginkotsu attack Kikyo and Suikotsu. Kikyo discovers the doctor, having a frightening alter ego and being a member for the resurrected Band of Seven.
| 109 | 22 | "Hidden in the Mist: Onward to Mt. Hakurei!"; Transliteration: "Kiri ni Kakureta Hakureizan e Mukae" (Japanese: 霧に隠れた白霊山へ向かえ) | Satoshi Toba | Akatsuki Yamatoya | Mitsuko Kase | May 5, 2003 | July 16, 2005 |
Suikotsu fights Inuyasha with ease, that is until his doctor persona struggles to emerge again. Inuyasha and his companions tend to Kikyo, taking her to a nearby forest in order for her to regain consciousness. Kikyo discusses Mount Hakurei, a sacred mountain capable of absolving and cleansing criminals. It is explained that the purity of Suikotsu became tainted when nigh the mountain. While Inuyasha and his friends head to Mount Hakurei, the four remaining members of the Band of Seven are finally reunited with their leader.
| 110 | 23 | "Enter Bankotsu, The Leader of the Band of Seven"; Transliteration: "Shichinintai no Shuryō, Bankotsu Tōjō" (Japanese: 七人隊の首領 蛮骨登場) | Masakazu Amiya | Katsuhiko Chiba | Kiyoshi Fukumoto | May 12, 2003 | July 23, 2005 |
Bankotsu, the leader of the Band of Seven, orders Kohaku to send a letter stating that he would retrieve the halberd from the castle. Meanwhile, Inuyasha and his friends try to figure out how to pass through the barrier surrounding Mount Hakurei. Bankotsu raids the castle and retrieves the halberd. Inuyasha finally shows up and fights Bankotsu.
| 111 | 24 | "The Big Clash: Banryu versus the Wind Scar"; Transliteration: "Gekitotsu! Banryū vs Kaze no Kizu!" (Japanese: 激突! 蛮竜VS風の傷!) | Teruo Sato | Katsuhiko Chiba | Yukio Nishimoto | May 19, 2003 | July 30, 2005 |
While Inuyasha and Bankotsu face off against each other for the first time, the rest of the group are to handle the remaining members for the Band of Seven. At Mount Hakurei, Rin follows Kohaku to a nearby cave. When the remaining five members are forced to retreat, Kagome notices that the demon puppet of Naraku has an unusually purified scent. Within the cave, Kohaku kindly protects Rin from the emerging demons and urges her to escape. Sesshomaru stops holding a grudge towards Kohaku, seeing Rin unharmed. Unfortunately for Rin, her friendship with Kohaku ends when he reveals to the remaining five members that Sesshomaru is their enemy.
| 112 | 25 | "Afloat on the Lake Surface: The Barrier of Hijiri Island"; Transliteration: "Komen ni Ukabu Hijiri Jima Kekkai" (Japanese: 湖面に浮かぶ聖島の結界) | Megumi Yamamoto | Junki Takegami | Megumi Yamamoto | May 26, 2003 | August 6, 2005 |
Shintaro, the young son of the village headman, pleads for help when his father fails to return for two weeks from a shrine on Hijiri Island in the middle of a misty lake. The villagers believe that the village is cursed due to the absence of the headman. Inuyasha and his friends travel with Shintaro to the island, being the source of the same purified scent of the demon puppet. Bankotsu appears to fight Inuyasha yet again. To make matters worse, Tetsusaiga is rendered powerless against Banryu. It is explained that Saint Hakushin, the monk of the shrine, is responsible for putting up a barrier surrounding the mountain and the island. Miroku and Shintaro work together to destroy the core of the barrier.
| 113 | 26 | "The Sacred Vajra and the Mystery of the Living Buddha"; Transliteration: "Seinaru Dokko to Sokushinbutsu no Nazo" (Japanese: 聖なる独鈷と即身仏の謎) | Tatsuya Ishihara | Tetsuko Takahashi | Tatsuya Ishihara | June 2, 2003 | August 13, 2005 |
With the barrier destroyed, Inuyasha and Bankotsu continue fighting, clashing each other with lightning attacks. The altar ornament Saint Hakushin is mystically summoned and has purified the Tetsusaiga. A barrier is formed around Bankotsu, transporting him to a hidden temple. Inuyasha and his friends make their way head towards Mount Hakurei. However, the power of the barrier erected by the spirit of Saint Hakushin cannot be broken or crossed by any demon. Miroku and Sango enter the barrier to find Naraku, while Inuyasha, Kagome, Shippo, and Kirara stay behind.
| 114 | 27 | "Koga's Solitary Battle"; Transliteration: "Kōga no Kokō Naru Tatakai" (Japanese: 鋼牙の孤高なる戦い) | Satoshi Toba | Akatsuki Yamatoya | Mitsuko Kase | June 9, 2003 | August 20, 2005 |
Koga is attacked by Renkotsu and Ginkotsu from afar. Sango and Miroku investigate Mount Hakurei from within its barrier, but he struggles to retain his lechery for her. Renkotsu and Ginkotsu are lured out of the barrier after bombarding Koga with cannon blasts and flamethrowers, which gives Koga the upper hand. Renkotsu is bruised by Koga. Ginkotsu self-destructs and gives the jewel shard for Renkotsu. Inuyasha senses this and goes to the wounded Koga, whose legs are seemingly immobilized.
| 115 | 28 | "Lured by the Black Light"; Transliteration: "Suikomareru Kuroi Hikari" (Japanese: 吸い込まれる黒い光) | Hirofumi Ogura | Katsuyuki Sumisawa | Kiyoshi Fukumoto | June 16, 2003 | August 27, 2005 |
When their paths crossed, Kikyo meets Bankotsu, who claims he is fearless of the afterlife. Suikotsu ambushes Jaken and Rin, and they fall off the cliff after the log bridge collapses. Sesshomaru ignores Jakotsu and reunites with Jaken. Rin is met with the good persona of Suikotsu in a forest, as he brings her back to the village. However, his evil persona takes over, and Jakotsu takes custody of Rin. It is apparent that Suikotsu struggles with his two personas while attempting to kill the orphaned children.
| 116 | 29 | "The Exposed Face of Truth"; Transliteration: "Sarakedasareta Shinjitsu no Kao" (Japanese: さらけだされた真実の顔) | Masakazu Amiya | Katsuyuki Sumisawa | Susumu Nishizawa | June 23, 2003 | September 3, 2005 |
Sesshomaru is beguiled into the barrier of the mountain, being forced to combat against Jakotsu. Sesshomaru pierces his hand into Jakotsu and throws his sword into Suikotsu. However, the two remain alive due to the tainted shards of the Shikon Jewel in each of their throats. Kikyo arrives and interrupts the battle, implanting a Sacred Arrow in Suikotsu, hence purifying his shard of the Shikon Jewel. Suikotsu, finally free of his evil persona, reveals the origins of his conflicting personalities. He explains that his bad persona arose as he first killed someone with his own hands. Before Kikyo can take the jewel shard, Jakotsu kills Suikotsu and steals it.
| 117 | 30 | "Vanished in a River of Flames"; Transliteration: "Honō no Kawa ni Kieta Aitsu" (Japanese: 炎の川に消えたアイツ) | Teruo Sato | Katsuhiko Chiba | Mitsuko Kase | June 30, 2003 | September 10, 2005 |
Renkotsu vows to avenge Ginkotsu and Inuyasha sends Koga to a cave near a waterfall. Renkotsu distracts Inuyasha with the Saimyōshō, and ignites the river with flames to trap the others. Renkotsu threatens to light incendiary devices in the cave, but Inuyasha sends Renkotsu into the river of flames, causing an explosion. However, both of them manage to separately survive.
| 118 | 31 | "Into the Depths of Mt. Hakurei"; Transliteration: "Hakureizan no Oku no Oku" (Japanese: 白霊山の奥の奥) | Tatsuya Ishihara | Akatsuki Yamatoya | Tatsuya Ishihara | July 7, 2003 | September 17, 2005 |
As they have reached the summit of Mount Hakurei, Miroku and Sango are attacked by Kagura in a shaft. When Kagura knocks Sango unconscious, Miroku uses the Wind Tunnel to kill the demons, even enduring the poison of the Saimyōshō. Meanwhile, Jakotsu gives the jewel shard for Bankotsu. Inuyasha decides to enter the barrier in order to find Miroku and Sango, but finds himself in trouble when confronted by Renkotsu. Inuyasha is purified by the barrier reverting himself to human form, while Miroku and Sango are purified by the barrier, and escape outside the mountain.
| 119 | 32 | "Divine Malice of the Saint"; Transliteration: "Kōgōshii Akui no Seija" (Japanese: 神々しい悪意の聖者) | Megumi Yamamoto | Junki Takegami | Megumi Yamamoto | July 14, 2003 | September 24, 2005 |
Although Inuyasha avoids Renkotsu, he now faces off against Jakotsu. Miroku and Sango discover a hidden temple being shrouded in the mists of Mount Hakurei, which lead them directly to Saint Hakushin, who continues to uphold the barrier despite his knowledge of the true nature of Naraku. Saint Hakushin explains that he fell ill during a time of famine in his village, swearing to protect the village after he died. The pair must destroy Saint Hakushin and his formidable barrier, in hopes for Inuyasha to regain his demonic powers.
| 120 | 33 | "Fare Thee Well: Jakotsu's Requiem"; Transliteration: "Sayonara Jakotsu no Chinkonka" (Japanese: さよなら蛇骨の鎮魂歌) | Satoshi Toba | Akatsuki Yamatoya | Masayuki Miyaji | July 28, 2003 | October 1, 2005 |
Inuyasha defeats Jakotsu, having his demonic powers restored. Renkotsu removes the jewel shard from Jakotsu. Meanwhile, Kikyo questions Saint Hakushin about his desire after being reborn through Naraku. Elsewhere, Bankotsu is aware of Renkotsu. He kills him to steal all of the jewel shards. Kikyo empathizes with Saint Hakushin, as he dissolves the barrier and she brings solace to his spirit.
| 121 | 34 | "Final Battle: The Last and Strongest of the Band of Seven"; Transliteration: "Kessen! Saikyō Saigo no Shichinintai" (Japanese: 決戦! 最強最後の七人隊) | Hirofumi Ogura | Katsuhiko Chiba | Susumu Nishizawa | August 4, 2003 | October 8, 2005 |
Bankotsu sets his sight on Inuyasha, using all seven jewel shards. Bankotsu explains how the Band of Seven was joined after he first met Naraku, who mentions about the manifestation of the Shikon Jewel. Bankotsu recalls the moment that he was resurrected by Naraku with the jewel shard. Miroku and Sango return to the shaft, as they are met by Kagura once again. It is discovered that Naraku used Saint Hakushin to reside within the barrier of Mount Hakurei in order to complete his demonic transformation, all due to the fact that Inuyasha has acquired the Barrier Shattering. Kagome discovers Naraku and Bankotsu inside the mountain.
| 122 | 35 | "The Power of Banryu: Duel to the Death on Mt. Hakurei"; Transliteration: "Kyōretsu Banryū: Hakureizan no Shitō" (Japanese: 強烈蛮竜 白霊山の死闘) | Masakazu Amiya | Katsuhiko Chiba | Toshiya Shinohara | August 11, 2003 | October 15, 2005 |
Inuyasha nearly removes all of the jewel shards from Bankotsu. He describes him as a human shield for Naraku, to which he objects. Inuyasha notices the jewel shard embedded in Banryu when it evolves after slashing through one thousand demons. The fight ends after Inuyasha uses the Backlash Wave. Mount Hakurei becomes animated, becoming like quicksand within the caves, where Koga becomes devoured. Kagome, Shippo, and Kirara reunite with Miroku and Sango. Inuyasha is seen entangled in an intestinal structure and ascending toward Naraku.
| 123 | 36 | "Beyond the Darkness - Naraku Reborn!"; Transliteration: "Kurayami no Saki ni Shinsei Naraku" (Japanese: 暗闇の先に新生奈落) | Tatsuya Ishihara | Katsuyuki Sumisawa | Tatsuya Ishihara | August 18, 2003 | October 22, 2005 |
Naraku is reborn from Mount Hakurei, in which the mountain is part of himself. He collects and merges all seven jewel shards, revealing his completed demonic transformation. Inuyasha attempts to attack Naraku with the Wind Scar, only to have that attack absorbed and reflected in various parts of the cave. Kikyo witnesses Kagura from the mountain with an unusual bundle. Kagome senses Koga's presence within Naraku's demonic aura, dispersing the Wind Scar and releasing Koga from the demonic aura. Naraku begins to destroy the mountain, trapping Inuyasha and the others.
| 124 | 37 | "Farewell Kikyo, My Beloved"; Transliteration: "Saraba Itoshiki Kikyō yo" (Japanese: さらば愛しき桔梗よ) | Teruo Sato | Katsuyuki Sumisawa | Mitsuko Kase | August 25, 2003 | October 29, 2005 |
While Inuyasha goes down into the depths of the mountain to save Koga, the others escape from the collapsing Mount Hakurei. Meanwhile, Naraku confronts Kikyo, who questions his purpose. Naraku says that he lured her to the mountain. He is no longer held back by the human heart of Onigumo, which is now in the possession of Kagura. Kikyo is sent into the crevices of the cliff. Sesshomaru enters to attack Naraku, in which it is absorbed and reflected back. As Naraku leaves, Sesshomaru informs Inuyasha about Kikyo.
| 125 | 38 | "The Darkness in Kagome's Heart"; Transliteration: "Kagome no Kokoro no Yami" (Japanese: かごめの心の闇) | Megumi Yamamoto | Tetsuko Takahashi | Megumi Yamamoto | September 1, 2003 | November 5, 2005 |
Unable to find Kikyo, Inuyasha and his companions revisit Shintaro's village, where it is later ravaged by a swarm of demons. They are met by an elderly priest, who tells about Kikyo being washed up at the end of a riverbank two days prior on the other side of the mountain. Inuyasha goes in that direction in hopes of finding her. When a group of soldiers capture Kagome, Miroku, and Sango, they find out that she has been tricked by Kagura. While Miroku and Sango are trapped, Kagome becomes ensnared by the darkness in her heart, as The Infant, the seventh incarnation of Naraku whom Kagura took from the mountain, possesses her.
| 126 | 39 | "Transform Heartache into Courage!"; Transliteration: "Kokoro no Itami o Yūki ni Kaero" (Japanese: 心の痛みを勇気にかえろ) | Satoshi Toba | Tetsuko Takahashi | Masayuki Miyaji | September 8, 2003 | November 12, 2005 |
Shippo finds and asks Inuyasha to rescue the others. After defeating the soldiers, Inuyasha realizes he was tricked by Kagura. Meanwhile, The Infant orders Kagura to implant the tainted jewel shard into Kagome. However, Kagome regains control of herself and overcomes her bitterness towards Kikyo. Inuyasha and the others find her, and they interrogate The Infant as being the human heart of Naraku. The Infant departs after repelling Inuyasha's counterattack. Inuyasha later discovers how dangerous his deep and strong affections for Kikyo are for Kagome.
| 127 | 40 | "Don't Boil It! The Terrifying Dried-Up Demon!"; Transliteration: "Nichadame! Kyōfu no Himono Yōkai" (Japanese: 煮ちゃダメ! 恐怖の干物妖怪) | Masakazu Amiya | Katsuhiko Chiba | Susumu Nishizawa | September 15, 2003 | January 4, 2006 |
Kagome returns home, hoping to take her mind off of Feudal Japan for a while. Unfortunately, the high school is preparing for a cultural festival, much to her chagrin, being suggested by her friends to be an understudy for the cultural festival. It is realized that Naraku has nearly all the shards of the Shikon Jewel, eluded by only a single shard that cannot be found anywhere in the world. Meanwhile, Miroku urges Inuyasha to prevent Kagome from being kidnapped a second time. Kagome is frustrated that she must be the star attraction of the cultural festival, yet she gets appreciated by her active role in participation. Inuyasha goes to the present day and discovers the festival.
