= Dance Dance Revolution X3 vs. 2ndMix =

2011 music video game

Dance Dance Revolution X3 VS 2ndMix
- Developers: Konami, Bemani
- Publisher: Konami
- Series: Dance Dance Revolution
- Platform: Arcade
- Release: JP: November 16, 2011; AS: December 16, 2011
- Genres: Music, exercise
- Modes: Single-player, multiplayer
- Arcade system: Bemani PC Type 4 (Windows XP Embedded)

Dance Dance Revolution X3 (ダンスダンスレボリューションX3, Dansu Dansu Reboryūshon Ekkusu Surī) is a music video game, and a part of the Dance Dance Revolution series. The arcade version of DDR X3 was revealed by Konami on June 2, 2011. The sequel to Dance Dance Revolution X2, X3 began public beta testing on June 8, 2011. Promotional information for the game revealed the full name for the game, called Dance Dance Revolution X3 VS 2ndMix (ダンスダンスレボリューションX3バーサスセカンドミックス, Dansu Dansu Reboryūshon Ekkusu Surī Bāsasu SekandoMikkusu) due to the new "2ndMix" mode in the game. It was released in Japan on November 16, 2011, for dedicated cabinets and November 30, 2011, for upgrade kits, and December 16, 2011, in Asia.

== Development ==
Development on X3 began shortly after X2 was released. X3 was the final entry in the "X" Trilogy, however, the game's UI and unlocking mechanisms will later be reused in another title. From June 8 to June 10, 2011, a location test was held in Akihabara, Tokyo. This location test revealed new songs and other features. These features included the new Target Score and BEMANI folders. The menu screens also got an update; they are now blue instead of green. Other enhancements to the theme were also made, such as the animation of the background, which was very similar to the one used on Dance Dance Revolution II.

Konami also announced that there would be a new 2ndMIX mode, where the player could play a full HD recreation of DDR 2ndMIX. This game is notably the first BEMANI game to feature a modernized version of an older game as a game mode. The system backdrop music is based on the TAG-composed default music selection from DanceDanceRevolution II. In 2ndMIX MODE, characters no longer perform their original dancing moves. Instead, they employ the new moves from DanceDanceRevolution X and DanceDanceRevolution SuperNOVA. The same camera angles used in the main game are also used in 2ndMIX MODE. The dancers consequently appear very little in the game.

== Features ==
- 2ndMIX mode. The player is able to play an HD remaster of "DanceDanceRevolution 2ndMIX", including all licenses except "STRICTLY BUSINESS" from the game. E-Amusement capabilities are added to the mode.
- Quick Play mode, a similar mode to "Marathon Mode" from DDR X2 in which PASELI users can use the pay-per-song method for as much stages as the arcade allows. For some time, this mode was also the only way to access the Challenge charts of some songs.
- Target Score, which allows players to view machine and e-Amusement records without playing the song.
- "BEMANI Title" sort, which allows songs to be sorted by the BEMANI title they originally appeared in.
- DRILL COURSE has been removed.
- Last Dance Dance Revolution game with Course mode until Dance Dance Revolution A20.
- There are some arcade machines of DDR X3 in which judgment of streaked notes and the quantity of combos are placed under the note strip while others are placed on top of the note strip.
- Selecting a song folder will either:
  - Show song selections under it and hide the other folders, or
  - Show the other folders and hide the song selection under it.

DDR X3 also supports "e-AMUSEMENT GATE", a community website where players can form groups, share scores, and interact with other players.

=== Enjoy Level ===
As in previous games, DDR X3 vs 2ndMix uses a level unlocking system to unlock some of the game's unlockable content. Players need to fulfill certain requirements to fill up the "Enjoy Level" bar and when it is full, the player will level up and potentially unlock a song. This requires e-Amusement. Most of Enjoy Level unlocks are songs taken from North American DDR 2010 and DDR II, in addition to new songs.

=== Extra Stage ===
DDR X3 also implements a new system for accessing Extra Stage. "Star system" can now be used to access Extra Stage. When the player clear a song, they will get stars (shown below the grade) depending on what grade they get:

- AAA grade = 3 stars
- AA grade = 2 stars
- A-D grade = 1 star
- Song or course failed (E) = 0 stars
- Getting a full combo = Additional 1 star (Except AAA and E)

There are also two other ways to obtain stars. An additional star will be awarded if e-Amusement players clear a song on a specific difficulty depending on their dance title, with higher ranking necessitating a higher level (e.g. those with "足はじめ" title can get a star by clearing a 7-footer or higher, while those with "足鳳凰" only get a star if they clear a 16-footer or higher). From February 2, 2012, onward, e-Amusement players also receive a star after their first play of the day.

A slot with 9 star slots will be displayed below the results screen. When the player earn 9 stars, they can access Extra Stage regardless of their grade. After using them though, they will reset and the player must earn them back. For players with e-Amusement, if they do not have enough stars to access Extra Stage at the end of a credit, the stars will be carried over to their next playthrough. This does not apply to players without e-Amusement, who must score 3 stars each song if they want to access Extra Stage (as a result, they have to score either AAA or AA with full combo on all songs).

The new song available for Extra Stage is Amalgamation. In addition, the Encore Extra Stage songs are eventually accessible as Extra Stages after a specified date, with UNBELIEVABLE (Sparky remix) being available on January 25, 2012, NEPHILIM DELTA on April 25, 2012. As of July 23, 2012, all Extra Stage songs have been unlocked for regular play.

=== Encore Extra Stage ===
The requirement for accessing Encore Extra Stage is the same from DDR X2; score AA or better under Expert on the specific song during Extra Stage. Scoring AA or better on Amalgamationon Expert will grant the players access to UNBELIEVABLE (Sparky remix) on Expert. Two additional songs were added for Encore Extra Stage after a specified date: NEPHILIM DELTA can be accessed from January 25, 2012, onward by scoring AA or better on UNBELIEVABLE (Sparky remix) on Expert, and SILVER☆DREAM can be accessed from April 25, 2012, onward by scoring AA or better on NEPHILIM DELTA on Expert. All Encore Extra Stage songs have been unlocked as of July 23, 2012.

=== Extra Tour ===
A new Extra Stage event, called "EXTRA Tour" was announced on May 12, 2012, and started on May 14, 2012. In this event, new songs were added as Extra Stage. They appeared in specific regions at first and moved to other regions each day. The first song, tokyoEVOLVED appeared in Hokkaido and Okinawa Prefectures and moved to the south (for Hokkaido) and north (for Okinawa) until they eventually landed on each other's region. There was also a second route, starting on May 16, 2012, from Mie Prefecture and Fukui Prefecture. The new song available in these routes was osaka EVOLVED -毎度、おおきに！-.

The third route was announced May 19, 2012 and started on May 22, 2012, from Hokkaido and Okinawa Prefectures. The new song available in this route was New York EVOLVED. The fourth and final route was announced on May 26, 2012, and started on May 30, 2012, from Hokkaido and Okinawa Prefectures yet again. The new song available in this route was London EVOLVED.

After playing all Extra Tour songs at least once, scoring AA or better on Expert on any of these songs would unlock the Encore Extra Stage, Tohoku EVOLVED. The Extra Tour event was ended on July 22, 2012 and all songs were unlocked for regular play.

=== Crossover DDR ===
On August 2, 2012, a new event called "Crossover DDR" was started. In this event, players could unlock the 2ndMix-exclusive songs for use in X3 mode. Players simply needed to play the charts of the songs in 2ndMix mode to unlock them in X3 mode. As 2ndMix Mode only feature Basic, Difficult, and Expert charts for Single (or only Basic and Difficult in Double), the Beginner chart would be automatically unlocked once the player unlocked at least one of the main difficulties, while the Double Expert as well as Single and Double Challenge charts (which all songs have) would be unlocked once the player unlocked all other charts.

Three boss songs could also be unlocked through this event. Clearing all charts in Normal mode of the 2ndMix mode would unlock "TRIP MACHINE EVOLUTION" on Extra Stage, while clearing all charts in Hard mode would unlock "PARANOiA Revolution". Scoring AA or better on these songs on Expert would unlock the Encore Extra Stage, LOVE IS THE POWER Re:born. The 1-life battery in Encore Extra Stage was uniquely made to fail the player if they get GREAT or lower (instead of GOOD or lower).

The event was ended on November 5, 2012, and all songs were unlocked for regular play.

=== Internet Ranking ===
The game had Internet Ranking like previous games. As usual, it used the courses available in the game. The game used e-Amusement to upload the scores to network. There were five Internet Rankings :

- INTERNET RANKING#1 = February 8, 2012 - February 22, 2012 ~ uses HYPER and vs X3
- INTERNET RANKING#2 = February 29, 2012 - March 14, 2012 ~ uses VOCAL and UPPER
- INTERNET RANKING#3 = March 28, 2012 - April 15, 2012 ~ uses TAG PLATINUM and vs 2ndMIX
- INTERNET RANKING#4 = May 9, 2012 - May 27, 2012 ~ uses RECOMMEND and BEMANI
- INTERNET RANKING#5 = July 4, 2012 - July 22, 2012 ~ uses EVOLVED and Revolution

=== Daily Special ===
On AOU 2012, Konami announced a new event called "Daily Special" that started February 20, 2012. In this event, a new BEMANI crossover was available on each day of the week (from Monday to Friday). The cycle of the song unlocking was done on 12.00 P.M. (JP UTC) and required e-Amusement. The songs were:

- SigSig
- message
- 天上の星 ～黎明記～ (Tenjou no Hoshi ~Reimeiki~)
- 繚乱ヒットチャート (Ryouran Hit Chart)
- 雫 (Shizuku)

The cycle of the song unlocking were shuffled three times, on March 19, April 16, and May 14, 2012. An additional event, called "Weekend Special" was started on May 5, 2012. It occurred only during weekends (Saturday and Sunday) and also cycled the songs, only instead of days, they cycled based on hours. Both events were ended on May 28, 2012, and all songs were unlocked for regular play.

=== Append travel ===
DDR X3 was one of the BEMANI games that held the new APPEND TRAVEL event to promote jubeat copious APPEND. The event was started on March 14, 2012. Players could collect APPEND ENERGY and buy items from e-Amusement GATE, some of which altered aspects of the game. Those were:

- Accessory - Jubeat Mask
- Item - Enjoy Full Stage (would be able to pass the stage even if the dance meter is empty)
- Item - Enjoy Level Booster (leveling up Enjoy Level became easier)

The event ended on September 24, 2012.

== Music ==
The game's song list is split into two modes, X3 and 2ndMix. 2ndMix mode exclusively contains the song list of Dance Dance Revolution 2ndMix, while X3 contains the rest of new and returning songs.

=== X3 mode ===
There are 75 new songs. In addition, all songs which were previously exclusive to 2ndMix mode are accessible in this mode as of August 2, 2012. A total of 21 songs from previous games were removed, all of them being licenses; 1 out of 3 from Dance Dance Revolution SuperNova 2, 16 out of 25 from Dance Dance Revolution X, and 4 out of 21 from Dance Dance Revolution X2. Dancemania licenses that were brought back in Dance Dance Revolution X and Dance Dance Revolution X2 remain, while all licensed songs from A Different Drum records have been removed. The licensed tracks brought over from Dance Dance Revolution X2 (PS2) and Dance Dance Revolution Hottest Party 3 have also been removed.

Counting the revivals, there are a total of 516 songs in X3 mode. With the exception of the removed songs listed, all songs from Dance Dance Revolution X2 are still playable.

Song	Artist	Other Information
Licensed Songs (12 total)
"BRILLIANT 2U (AKBK MIX)"	NAOKI	from DanceDanceRevolution 2ndMIX ORIGINAL SOUNDTRACK
"COME BACK TO MY HEART"	Another Infinity feat. Mayumi Morinaga	from the album AGEHA
"コネクト" (Connect)	(no artist)	from pop'n music 20 fantasia cover of ClariS; Opening theme of 魔法少女まどか☆マギカ
"future gazer"	fripSide	Opening theme of とある科学の超電磁砲
"ヘビーローテーション" (Heavy Rotation)	(no artist)	from HELLO! POP'N MUSIC cover of AKB48
"KEEP ON MOVIN' (Y&Co. DJ BOSS remix)"	N.M.R	from DanceDanceRevolution 2ndMIX ORIGINAL SOUNDTRACK
"LOVE & JOY"	木村由姫	from jubeat knit from the album Sole Sorfege
"女々しくて" (Memeshikute)	ゴールデンボンバー	from jubeat plus
"PARANOiA (kskst mix)"	180	from DanceDanceRevolution 2ndMIX ORIGINAL SOUNDTRACK
"PUT YOUR FAITH IN ME (DA's Twinkly Disco Remix)"	UZI-LAY	from DanceDanceRevolution 2ndMIX ORIGINAL SOUNDTRACK
"STRAIGHT JET"	栗林みな実	Opening theme of IS〈インフィニット・ストラトス〉
"TRIP MACHINE (xac nanoglide mix)"	DE-SIRE	from DanceDanceRevolution 2ndMIX ORIGINAL SOUNDTRACK
Konami Original Songs (13 total)
"アルストロメリア (walk with you remix)" (Alstroemeria (walk with you remix))	TAG	New Konami Original
"ビューティフル レシート" (Beautiful Receipt)	Lucky Vacuum	New Konami Original
"Fever"	Sota F. feat. Carol Gadsden	New Konami Original
"Go For The Top" (BG)	U1 overground	New Konami Original
"HEART BEAT FORMULA"	TAG	New Konami Original
"I/O"	Ryu☆	New Konami Original
"New Beginning"	Sota Fujimori	New Konami Original
"Programmed Universe"	kors k	New Konami Original
"REBORN MAGIC"	seiya murai meets "eimy"	New Konami Original
"Resurrection"	Dormir	New Konami Original
"REVOLUTIONARY ADDICT" (BG)	TAG underground	New Konami Original
"Tribe"	猫叉Master	New Konami Original
"TWINKLE♥HEART"	jun	New Konami Original
From Console Version (24 total)
"CRAZY♥LOVE"	jun	from Dance Dance Revolution (2010)
"dreaming can make a wish come true"	jun & NRG Factory feat. Anna Kaelin	from Dance Dance Revolution (2010)
"ever snow"	TЁЯRA	from Dance Dance Revolution (2010)
"Find You Again"	The W feat. Rita Boudreau	from Dance Dance Revolution (2010)
"Get Back Up!"	NMR Runners	from Dance Dance Revolution II
"Haunted Rhapsody"	Architecht ft. Jasmine Nii	from Dance Dance Revolution II
"HEARTBREAK (Sound Selektaz remix)"	NAOKI ft. Becca Hossany	from Dance Dance Revolution II
"In The Air"	Bill Hamel & James Rowand	from Dance Dance Revolution II
"IN THE ZONE"	U1 (NPD3 style) & KIDD KAZMEO	from Dance Dance Revolution (2010)
"Let's Get Away"	NAOKI feat. Brenda Burch	from Dance Dance Revolution (2010)
"MAGIC PARADE"	Lea Drop feat. Katie Dellenbach	from Dance Dance Revolution (2010)
"Private Eye"	atomsoak ft. cerol	from Dance Dance Revolution (2010)
"Rescue Me"	NAOKI feat. Fracus	from Dance Dance Revolution S
"Rhythms Inside"	DKC Crew	from Dance Dance Revolution (2010)
"Seasons"	TOMOSUKE feat. Crystal Paloa	from Dance Dance Revolution (2010)
"Seule"	Preston Powis	from Dance Dance Revolution II
"Share The Love"	Brenda Burch	from Dance Dance Revolution (2010)
"Something Special"	nc ft. Jasmine Nii	from Dance Dance Revolution II
"Take A Step Forward"	TAG feat. Sydney Powers	from Dance Dance Revolution II
"The Heavens Above"	U1 /F Anneliese	from Dance Dance Revolution II
"TIME"	NM feat. Aleisha G.	from Dance Dance Revolution (2010)
"Until the End"	Philip Webb	from Dance Dance Revolution (2010)
"Wicked Plastik"	nc ft. Electric Touch	from Dance Dance Revolution (2010)
"Wings of an Angel (Fly With Me)"	J-Mi & Midi-D	from Dance Dance Revolution II
BEMANI Crossover Songs (10 total)
"Chronos"	TAG	from GuitarFreaks V6 & DrumMania V6 BLAZING!!!!
"Diamond Dust"	TAG	from REFLEC BEAT
"FLOWER"	DJ YOSHITAKA	from jubeat knit APPEND / REFLEC BEAT
"Mermaid girl"	Cream puff	from beatmania IIDX 18 Resort Anthem
"message"	dj TAKA feat. flare	from REFLEC BEAT
"繚乱ヒットチャート" (Ryouran Hit Chart) (BG)	ギラギラメガネ団	from GuitarFreaks V3 & DrumMania V3
"雫" (Shizuku)"	あさき	from pop'n music 12 いろは
"SigSig"	kors k	from beatmania IIDX 12 HAPPY SKY
"隅田川夏恋歌" (Sumidagawa Karenka)	seiya-murai feat. ALT	from jubeat ripples
"天上の星 ～黎明記～" (Tenjou no Hoshi ~Reimeiki~)	TЁЯRA	from pop'n music 18 せんごく列伝
Tsugidoka! Songs (4 total)
"Cosmic Hurricane"	TAG	つぎドカ! Song
"紅焔" (Kouen)	PON	つぎドカ! Song
"恋閃繚乱" (Rensen Ryouran)	2B-Waves	つぎドカ! Song
"snow prism"	Qrispy Joybox	つぎドカ! Song
Boss Songs (4 total)
"Amalgamation"	Mystic Moon	New Konami Original; Accessible as EXTRA STAGE#1
"UNBELIEVABLE (Sparky remix)"	jun feat. Sarah-Jane	from Dance Dance Revolution II; Accessible as ENCORE EXTRA STAGE#1; Accessible as EXTRA STAGE#2
"NEPHILIM DELTA"	L.E.D.-G	New Konami Original; Accessible as ENCORE EXTRA STAGE#2; Accessible as EXTRA STAGE#3
"SILVER☆DREAM"	jun	from Dance Dance Revolution Hottest Party 2 Accessible as ENCORE EXTRA STAGE#3
Extra Tour (5 total)
"tokyoEVOLVED"	NAOKI underground	from Dance Dance Revolution Hottest Party song is split into 3 versions Accessible as EXTRA STAGE#1
"osaka EVOLVED -毎度、おおきに！-" (osaka EVOLVED -Maido, Ookini!-)	NAOKI underground	from Dance Dance Revolution Hottest Party 2 song is split into 3 versions Accessible as EXTRA STAGE#2
"New York EVOLVED"	NC underground	from Dance Dance Revolution (2010) song is split into 3 versions Accessible as EXTRA STAGE#3
"London EVOLVED"	TAG underground	from Dance Dance Revolution II song is split into 3 versions Accessible as EXTRA STAGE#4
"Tohoku EVOLVED"	2.1MB underground	New Konami Original; Accessible as ENCORE EXTRA STAGE
Crossover DDR Extra Stages (3 total)
"PARANOiA Revolution" (BG)	CLIMAX of MAXX 360	New Konami Original; Accessible as EXTRA STAGE
"TRIP MACHINE EVOLUTION" (BG)	DE-JAVU	New Konami Original; Accessible as EXTRA STAGE
"LOVE IS THE POWER -Re:born-"	NM	from BOOM BOOM DANCE; Accessible as ENCORE EXTRA STAGE
Newly Revived Songs (18 total)
"BAD GIRLS"	Juliet Roberts	from Dance Dance Revolution 2ndMix
"Boom Boom Dollar (Red Monster Mix)"	King Kong & D.Jungle Girls	from Dance Dance Revolution 2ndMix
"Boys"	Smile.dk	from Dance Dance Revolution 2ndMix
"DUB-I-DUB"	ME & MY	from Dance Dance Revolution 2ndMix
"GET UP'N MOVE"	S & K	from Dance Dance Revolution 2ndMix
"I Believe In Miracles (The Lisa Marie Experience Radio Edit)"	Hi-Rise	from Dance Dance Revolution 2ndMix
"IF YOU WERE HERE"	JENNIFER	from Dance Dance Revolution 2ndMix
"MAKE IT BETTER (So-REAL MIX)"	mitsu-O! SUMMER	from Dance Dance Revolution 2ndMix
"PUT YOUR FAITH IN ME (Jazzy Groove)"	UZI-LAY	from Dance Dance Revolution 2ndMix
"Smoke"	Mr. Ed Jumps The Gun	from Dance Dance Revolution 2ndMix
"stomp to my beat"	JS16	from Dance Dance Revolution 2ndMix
"Butterfly"	Smile.dk	from Dance Dance Revolution
"Have You Never Been Mellow"	The Olivia Project	from Dance Dance Revolution
"KUNG FU FIGHTING"	BUS STOP ft. CARL DOUGLAS	from Dance Dance Revolution
"LET'S GET DOWN"	JT PLAYAZ	from Dance Dance Revolution
"Little Bitch"	The Specials	from Dance Dance Revolution
"My Fire (UKS Remix)"	X-Treme	from Dance Dance Revolution
"That's The Way (I Like It)"	KC & The Sunshine Band	from Dance Dance Revolution
Removed Songs (21 total)
"Bonafied Lovin'"	Chromeo	from Dance Dance Revolution X2
"DAFT PUNK IS PLAYING AT MY HOUSE"	LCD Soundsystem	from Dance Dance Revolution X2
"Feel Good Inc."	Gorillaz	from Dance Dance Revolution X2
"ICE ICE BABY"	VANILLA ICE	from Dance Dance Revolution X2
"Always On My Mind"	Pet Shop Boys	from Dance Dance Revolution X
"Big Girls Don't Cry"	Purefocus	from Dance Dance Revolution X
"Feel"	Neuropa	from Dance Dance Revolution X
"Ghetto Blasta Deluxe"	Audio Magnetics	from Dance Dance Revolution X
"Happy"	Fischerspooner	from Dance Dance Revolution X
"Here It Goes Again"	OK Go	from Dance Dance Revolution X
"Make Me Cry"	Junk Circuit	from Dance Dance Revolution X
"Put 'Em Up"	Edun	from Dance Dance Revolution X
"Reach Up"	Alien Six	from Dance Dance Revolution X
"世界は踊る" (Sekai wa Odoru)	Breakerz	from Dance Dance Revolution X
"スキ☆メロ" (Suki☆Melo)	小倉優子	from Dance Dance Revolution X
"Swingin'"	Bill Hamel & Naughty G.	from Dance Dance Revolution X
"旅人" (Tabibito)	高杉さと美	from Dance Dance Revolution X
"U Can't Touch This"	MC Hammer	from Dance Dance Revolution X
"We Come Alive"	Alien Six	from Dance Dance Revolution X
"We've Got To Make It Tonight"	Babamars	from Dance Dance Revolution X
"ANGELUS -アンジェラス-"	島谷ひとみ	from Dance Dance Revolution SuperNova 2

=== 2ndMIX mode ===
The 2ndMix mode exclusively contains DDR 2ndMix's song list as well as two new songs. Note that the song "Strictly Business" as well as the songs that were introduced in the LINK version are not included in this mode. There are a total of 30 songs. As of August 2, 2012, all songs from this mode can be unlocked in X3 mode (except for "HERO", which uses the X-edit version from DDR X2 instead of the original version).

== Courses ==
In Course Mode, players go through five or six songs back-to-back, with no breaks. Players may set options before a course is played, but not midway between songs. Two difficulties are offered: Normal and Difficult. The dance gauge used is different between courses; courses with five songs use the normal dance gauge, while those with six songs use the battery dance gauge, where scoring a "Good", "Miss", or "N.G." judgment step will drain a non-renewable bar. In Normal difficulty, players start with eight bars, while Difficult only gives them four bars. X3 vs. 2ndMix was the last Dance Dance Revolution game to feature courses until Dance Dance Revolution A20.

Name	Songs
VOCAL	1. "Rhythms Inside"
VOCAL	2. "IN THE ZONE"
VOCAL	3. "ever snow"
VOCAL	4. "Seasons"
VOCAL	5. "Let's Get Away"
vs X3	1. "Get Back Up!"
vs X3	2. "Haunted Rhapsody"
vs X3	3. "Fever"
vs X3	4. "Programmed Universe"
vs X3	5. "Private Eye"
vs X3	6. "COME BACK INTO MY HEART"
RECOMMEND	1. "STRAIGHT JET"
RECOMMEND	2. "コネクト"
RECOMMEND	3. "LOVE & JOY"
RECOMMEND	4. "女々しくて"
RECOMMEND	5. "future gazer"
vs 2ndMix	1. "Have You Never Been Mellow"
vs 2ndMix	2. "LET'S GET DOWN"
vs 2ndMix	3. "My Fire (UKS Remix)"
vs 2ndMix	4. "Boom Boom Dollar (Red Monster Mix)"
vs 2ndMix	5. "I Believe In Miracles (The Lisa Marie Experience Radio Edit)"
vs 2ndMix	6. "stomp to my beat"
HYPER	1. "HEARTBREAK (Sound Selektaz remix)"
HYPER	2. "The Heavens Above"
HYPER	3. "dreaming can make a wish come true"
HYPER	4. "MAGIC PARADE"
HYPER	5. "Wicked Plastik"
UPPER	1. "Find You Again"
UPPER	2. "Wings of an Angel (Fly With Me)"
UPPER	3. "Until the End"
UPPER	4. "Share The Love"
UPPER	5. "I/O"
UPPER	6. "CRAZY♥LOVE"
TAG PLATINUM	1. "Take A Step Forward"
TAG PLATINUM	2. "Diamond Dust"
TAG PLATINUM	3. "HEART BEAT FORMULA"
TAG PLATINUM	4. "Chronos"
TAG PLATINUM	5. "アルストロメリア (walk with you remix)"
BEMANI	1. "Mermaid girl"
BEMANI	2. "message"
BEMANI	3. "天上の星 ～黎明記～"
BEMANI	4. "隅田川夏恋歌"
BEMANI	5. "繚乱ヒットシャート"
BEMANI	6. "FLOWER"
EVOLVED	1. "tokyoEVOLVED (TYPE1)"
EVOLVED	2. "osaka EVOLVED -毎度、おおきに！- (TYPE1)"
EVOLVED	3. "New York EVOLVED (Type A)"
EVOLVED	4. "London EVOLVED ver.A"
EVOLVED	5. "Tohoku EVOLVED"
Revolution	1. "Amalgamation"
Revolution	2. "UNBELIEVABLE (Sparky remix)"
Revolution	3. "NEPHILIM DELTA"
Revolution	4. "SILVER☆DREAM"
Revolution	5. "TRIP MACHINE EVOLUTION"
Revolution	6. "PARANOiA Revolution"

== Soundtrack ==
The Original Soundtrack for the "X3 Side" of DDR X3 vs 2ndMix was officially announced on April 20, 2012. It spans two discs, the first containing DDR X3 new songs and some songs from console versions while the second containing the rest of the songs from console versions, BEMANI crossovers, and disc specials. It was released on June 27, 2012.

Several promotions were held to commemorate the release of the soundtrack. This includes a Twitter campaign, release party, and autographs signing of the game producers.
