= Dance Dance Revolution II =

- Game logo
- Developer: Konami
- Publisher: Konami
- Series: Dance Dance Revolution
- Platform: Wii
- Release: NA: October 11, 2011; EU: November 25, 2011
- Genres: Music, Exercise
- Modes: Single player, Multiplayer

Dance Dance Revolution II, later released in Europe as Dance Dance Revolution Hottest Party 5, is a music video game in the Dance Dance Revolution series by Konami. It was released on October 11, 2011 for the Nintendo Wii in North America and on November 25, 2011 in Europe. Dance Dance Revolution II is the direct sequel to Dance Dance Revolution for the Wii. This game shares songs with the arcade version of Dance Dance Revolution X3 vs 2ndMix. It features characters from the arcade versions of Dance Dance Revolution. It was the final DDR game released for the Wii and is the latest in the series to be released for a home console as of 2026.

== Gameplay ==
E3 preview of Dance Dance Revolution II showing a character model from the arcade versions of DDR, and doubles mode, which can also be found in the arcade versions.

=== Double Mode ===
Double Mode, which was unavailable in previous Wii games, is now available. While playing in Double Mode, the player can only play the full version of licenses and shortened versions for Konami Original. There is no way to play shortened licenses or the full version of Konami Original.

=== Challenge Difficulty ===
In addition to the four main difficulties, the game now includes Challenge difficulty, similar to the arcade versions. However, because the special shock arrow (which takes the Challenge difficulty space) are not featured in this game, Challenge charts that originally feature shock arrows in the arcade version are excluded (e.g. smooooch・∀・).

=== Difficulty Scale Changes ===
Instead of the traditional ten-foot scale used by previous Wii games, the game now uses the 20-foot difficulty scale first introduced in DDR X. The highest ranked difficulty is the Challenge charts of Valkyrie dimension (in both Single and Double) and the Double-Challenge of POSSESSION, both of which are rated 19 and first introduced in the arcade version of DDR X2.

=== Full Songs ===
For the first time in the series since Dance Dance Revolution 5th Mix, players of Dance Dance Revolution II will be able to play long versions of songs. Full versions are only available for licenses and some Konami Original.

=== Multiplayer ===
Standard two-player multiplayer will return with the use of dance pads, and the game will support up to four players.

=== Replicant-D Action ===
"Replicant-D Action", which previously only available on the arcade version of DDR X2 will be available in this game. There are now 11 songs inside the folder (the previous seven from DDR X2, two songs from DDR Universe 3, and two new boss songs). Conditions for accessing the folder are now much easier.

== Interface and graphics ==
The song list still kept the same Cover Flow interface first introduced in DDR Hottest Party 3 which features the usual Groove Radar and multi-layered difficulty table. The interface dominantly features light blue color scheme with slant patterns and circles. Parts of the interface were reused in the arcade version of DDR X3 vs 2ndMix.

=== Characters ===
Most of the characters are taken from the arcade version of DDR instead of the usual cast from the previous Wii games. The models used are from the arcade version of DDR X2.

==== Default ====
- Emi
- Disco
- Yuni
- Rage
- Ruby
- Naoki
- Jun
- U1

==== Unlockable ====
- Mii
- Rena

== Music ==
There are 83 songs in this game.

- Songs with locks indicates it must be unlocked.
- Songs with clapperboards indicates it has a dedicated music/background video (displayed in a small screen instead of full screen).

Song	Artist	Other Information
Licensed Songs (19 total)
A Year Without Rain	Selena Gomez & The Scene	from the album A Year Without Rain
Baby ft. Ludacris	Justin Bieber	from the album My World 2.0
Beautiful Monster	Ne-Yo	from the album Libra Scale
Can't Be Tamed	Miley Cyrus	from the album Can't Be Tamed
Candy Girl	New Edition	from the album Candy Girl
Don't Go	Yazoo	from the album Upstairs at Eric's
Don't You Want Me	The Human League	from the album Dare
IN MY HEAD	Jason Derülo	from the album Jason Derülo
Just A Dream	Nelly	from the album 5.0
Just The Way You Are	Bruno Mars	from the album Doo-Wops & Hooligans
More Than Alive	The Ready Set	from the album I'm Alive, I'm Dreaming
Nothin' On You (feat.Bruno Mars)	B.o.B	from the album B.o.B Presents: The Adventures of Bobby Ray
Only Girl (In The World)	Rihanna	from the album Loud
Rocket	Goldfrapp	from the album Head First
Somebody To Love	Justin Bieber	from the album My World 2.0
Spice up your life	Spice Girls	from the album Spiceworld
Strip Me	Natasha Bedingfield	from the album Strip Me
This Time I Know It's For Real	Donna Summer	from the album Another Place and Time
Whip My Hair	Willow	
Lesson Songs (3 total)
Lesson by DJ	U.T.D & Friends	from Dance Dance Revolution Hottest Party
Lesson2 by DJ	MC DDR	from Dance Dance Revolution Hottest Party 2
Lesson3 by DJ	Dr. DDR	from Dance Dance Revolution Hottest Party 3
Konami Original Songs (33 total)
aftershock!!	DM Ashura	from Dance Dance Revolution Universe 3
All My Love	kors k feat.ЯIRE	from Dance Dance Revolution X2
CG Project	Latenighters	from Dance Dance Revolution X2
Dance Partay	DKC Crew	New Konami Original
Decade	kors k Vs. dj TAKA	from Dance Dance Revolution X2
Diamond Night	TOMOSUKE feat. Alexa Slaymaker	New Konami Original
dirty digital	kors k	from Dance Dance Revolution Universe 3
Dummy	RAM	from Dance Dance Revolution Universe 3
El ritmo te controla	Jeanette Herrera	New Konami Original
Get Back Up!	NMR runners	New Konami Original
Haunted Rhapsody	Architect ft. Jasmine Nii	New Konami Original
HEARTBREAK (Sound Selektaz remix)	NAOKI feat. Becca Hossany	New Konami Original
in love wit you	Kotaro feat. Aya	from Dance Dance Revolution X (JP PS2)
In The Air	Bill Hamel & James Rowand	New Konami Original
KISS KISS KISS AKBK MIX	Remixed by DJ Command	from Dance Dance Revolution X2
oarfish	kors k	from Dance Dance Revolution Universe 3
Poseidon (kors k mix)	NAOKI underground	from Dance Dance Revolution X2
real-high-SPEED	Makoto feat. SK	from Dance Dance Revolution X (JP PS2)
sakura storm	Ryu☆	from Dance Dance Revolution Universe 3
SAY A PRAYER	Des-ROW with Maxi Priest	New Konami Original
Seule	Preston Powis	New Konami Original
Sky Is The Limit	Sota F. feat. Anna	from Dance Dance Revolution X2
someday...	Haruna Anno	from Dance Dance Revolution X2
Something Special	nc ft. Jasmine Nii	New Konami Original
still unbreakable	Des-ROW Ft. Vanilla Ice	New Konami Original
Summer Fairytale	Design-MAD Crew	New Konami Original
Surrender (PureFocus remix)	U1 ft. Becca Hossany	New Konami Original
Take A Step Forward	TAG feat. Sydney Powers	New Konami Original
Tell Me What to Do	atomsoak ft. cerol	New Konami Original
The Heavens Above	U1 F/ Anneliese	New Konami Original
Theory of Eternity	TAG	from Dance Dance Revolution X2
Wings of an Angel (Fly With Me)	J-Mi and Midi-D	New Konami Original
Your Angel	DM Ashura feat. kors k	from Dance Dance Revolution Universe 3
BEMANI Crossovers (13 total)
Dazzlin' Darlin	HHH	from beatmania IIDX 15 DJ TROOPERS
Dazzlin' Darlin-AKBKmix-	Remixed by DJ Command	from beatmania IIDX 17 SIRIUS
DROP	dj TAKA feat. Kanako Hoshino	from beatmania IIDX 17 SIRIUS
FIRE FIRE	StripE	from beatmania IIDX 14 GOLD
GOLD RUSH	DJ YOSHITAKA-G feat. Michael a la mode	from beatmania IIDX 14 GOLD
I'm so Happy	Ryu☆	from jubeat knit
MEI	Amuro vs Killer	from beatmania IIDX 12 HAPPY SKY
Second Heaven	Ryu☆	from beatmania IIDX 14 GOLD
She is my wife	SUPER STAR MITSURU	from beatmania IIDX 17 SIRIUS
smooooch・∀・	kors k	from beatmania IIDX 16 EMPRESS
VANESSA	SUZAKU	from beatmania IIDX 14 GOLD
YELLOW CANDY	Risk Junk	from beatmania IIDX 16 EMPRESS
ZETA ~The World of Prime Numbers and the Transcendental Being~	Zektbach	from pop'n music 15 ADVENTURE
Nonstop Megamix (4 total)
HOTTEST PARTY		Nonstop Megamix of Dance Dance Revolution Hottest Party
HOTTEST PARTY 2		Nonstop Megamix of Dance Dance Revolution Hottest Party 2
HOTTEST PARTY 3		Nonstop Megamix of Dance Dance Revolution Hottest Party 3
DanceDanceRevolution		Nonstop Megamix of DanceDanceRevolution
Replicant D-Action (11 total)
888	DJ TECHNORCH	from Dance Dance Revolution Universe 3
Anti-Matter	Orbit1 & Milo	from Dance Dance Revolution X2
ΔMAX	DM Ashura	from Dance Dance Revolution Universe 3
London EVOLVED	TAG underground	New Konami Original song is split into 3 versions
New Decade	Sota F.	from Dance Dance Revolution X2
Pierce The Sky	JAKAZiD feat. K.N.	from Dance Dance Revolution X2
POSSESSION	TAG underground	from Dance Dance Revolution X2
Sakura Sunrise	Ryu☆	from Dance Dance Revolution X2
Shiny World	CAPACITY GATE	from Dance Dance Revolution X2
UNBELIEVABLE (Sparky remix)	jun feat. Sarah-Jane	New Konami Original
Valkyrie dimension	Spriggan	from Dance Dance Revolution X2

Due to memory limitations, music/background videos are now only displayed in a small screen to the right (for Player 1), left (for Player 2), or middle (Versus or Double Play).

GOLD RUSH only have the original IIDX video displayed. The new "AC DDR" and "CS DDR" versions from DDR X2 AC are not retained.

=== Full Version ===
The following list show the available songs that have full version. These songs are differentiated by having pink color scheme on the Groove Radar and difficulty table (instead of blue) and the player would be asked to choose between full or short versions after choosing the song.

- A Year Without Rain
- Baby ft. Ludacris
- Beautiful Monster
- Candy Girl
- Can't Be Tamed
- Dance Partay
- Don't Go
- Don't You Want Me
- El ritmo te controla
- Get Back Up!
- Haunted Rhapsody
- HEARTBREAK (Sound Selektaz remix)
- In My Head
- Just A Dream
- Just The Way You Are
- More Than Alive
- New Decade
- Nothin' On You (feat. Bruno Mars)
- Only Girl (In The World)
- Rocket
- SAY A PRAYER
- Sky Is The Limit
- Somebody To Love
- Something Special
- Spice Up Your Life
- still unbreakable
- Strip Me
- Surrender (PureFocus remix)
- Take A Step Forward
- Tell Me What to Do
- The Heavens Above
- This Time I Know It's For Real
- UNBELIEVABLE (Sparky remix)
- Whip My Hair
- Wings of an Angel (Fly With Me)
- ZETA ~The World of Prime Numbers and the Transcendental Being~
