= Music of Dance Dance Revolution (2009 video games) =

Konami announced that Dance Dance Revolution will feature at least 30 licensed songs along with their original music videos and artwork, and at least 20 original tracks by Konami's in-house musicians. It was also announced that there would be at least 150 songs available as downloadable content for the PlayStation 3 and Xbox 360 versions at launch.

== List of songs ==
The following songs are a tentative soundtrack. They have been revealed through press releases, preview trailers, and Bemani news sites and are expected to appear in all or some of the 2009 series of Dance Dance Revolution games.

Song	Artist	X2	HP 3
"A Brighter Day"	Naoki feat. Aleisha G.	✓	✓
"A Geisha's Dream"	Naoki feat. Smile.dk	✓	
"AM-3P ("Chaos" Special)"	Ktz	✓	
"B4U ("Voltage" Special)"	Naoki	✓	
"Baile La Samba"	Big Idea	✓	
"Be With You (Still Miss You)"	NC ft. Eddie Kay		✓
"Blue Rain"	DJ Taka vs Ryu☆	✓	
"Bonafied Lovin'"	Chromeo		✓
"Boogie Wonderland"	Earth, Wind & Fire		✓
"Brilliant2U"	Naoki		✓
"Brilliant 2U ("Stream" Special)"	Naoki	✓	
"Celebrate Night"	Naoki		✓
"Chance and Dice"	日本少年	✓	
"Closer"	Ne-Yo	✓	✓
"Crazy Control"	D-Crew with Val Tiatia	✓	✓
"D2R ("Freeze" Special)"	Naoki	✓	
"Dance Dance Revolution"	DDR All Stars	✓	
"Daft Punk Is Playing at My House"	LCD Soundsystem	✓	✓
"Dead End ("Groove Radar" Special)"	N&S	✓	
"Detroit Rock City"	Kiss		✓
"Disturbia"	Rihanna	✓	✓
"Do You Know? (The Ping Pong Song)"	Enrique Iglesias	✓	✓
"Dream on Dreamer"	Brand New Heavies	✓	✓
"Dynamite Rave"	Naoki	✓	✓
"Dynamite Rave ("Air" Special)"	Naoki	✓	
"Enjoy the Silence"	Depeche Mode		✓
"Feel Good Inc."	Gorillaz featuring De La Soul		✓
"Freeze"	NC ft. NRG Factory	✓	✓
"Good Times"	Chic		✓
"Gotta Dance"	Naoki feat. Aliesha G.	✓	✓
"Heatstroke"	Tag feat. Angie Lee	✓	✓
"Hungry Like the Wolf"	Duran Duran		✓
"Hysteria"	Naoki 190	✓	
"I Know You Want Me (Calle Ocho)"	Pitbull	✓	✓
"I'm Coming Out"	Diana Ross		✓
"Ice Ice Baby"	Vanilla Ice	✓	✓
"Just Dance"	Lady Gaga featuring Colby O'Donis	✓	✓
"Keep on Movin'"	NM	✓	✓
"The Ketchup Song"	Las Ketchup		✓
"Kimono Princess"	Jun	✓	✓
"L'amour et la Liberté (DDR Ver.)"	Naoki Underground	✓	
"La Bamba"	LH Music Creation	✓	
"La Camisa Negra"	Juanes	✓	✓
"La Libertad"	Cheryl Horrocks	✓	✓
"La Receta"	Carlos Coco Garcia	✓	✓
"La Senorita Virtual"	2MB	✓	
"Lesson by DJ"	UTD & Friends		✓
"Lesson2 by DJ"	MC DDR		✓
"Lesson3 by DJ"	Dr. DDR		✓
"Let the Beat Hit Em' (Classic R&B Style)"	Stone Bros.	✓	
"Let's Get It Started"	The Black Eyed Peas	✓	✓
"Love Again"	NM feat. Mr. E.	✓	✓
"Love is Orange"	Orange Lounge	✓	
"Mars Wars 3"	Jet Girl Spin	✓	
"Moonster"	Kobo uniting Marsha & D.	✓	
"My Prerogative"	Bobby Brown		✓
"My Summer Love (Tommy's Smile Mix)"	Mitsu-O! with Geila	✓	
"Never Gonna Give You Up"	Rick Astley		✓
"One Step at a Time"	Jordin Sparks		✓
"Paradise"	Lea Drop feat. McCall Clark		✓
"Pluto the First"	White Wall	✓	✓
"Pocketful of Sunshine"	Natasha Bedingfield	✓	✓
"Pork and Beans"	Weezer		✓
"Praise You"	Fatboy Slim		✓
"凛として咲く花の如く"	紅色リトマス	✓	
"Roppongi Evolved ver. A"	Tag Underground	✓	✓
"Roppongi Evolved ver. B"	Tag Underground	✓	✓
"Roppongi Evolved ver. C"	Tag Underground	✓	✓
"Sacred Oath"	Terra	✓	✓
"Shine"	Tomosuke feat. Adreana	✓	✓
"So What"	Pink	✓	✓
"South Side"	Moby featuring Gwen Stefani		✓
"Takin' It to the Sky"	U1 feat. Tammy S. Hansen	✓	✓
"The Space Dance"	Danny Tenaglia		✓
"This Night"	Jun feat. Sonnet	✓	✓
"Tierra Buena"	Wilma de Oliveira	✓	
"True♥Love (Clubstar's True Club Mix)"	Jun feat. Schanita	✓	✓
"Übertreffen"	Taka respect for J.S.B.	✓	
"Un Deux Trois"	SDMS	✓	
"Viva la Vida"	Coldplay	✓	✓
"What Will Come of Me"	Black Rose Garden	✓	✓
"When I Grow Up"	Pussycat Dolls	✓	✓
"You Are a Star"	Naoki feat. Anna Kaelin	✓	✓
"You Got It (The Right Stuff)"	New Kids on the Block	✓	✓
"零 -Zero-"	Terra	✓	

== New Music ==
The music of Dance Dance Revolution is mostly North American pop and rock hits from past and present. In addition, new and returning Konami Original songs by in-house musicians such as Naoki Maeda are also to be included in the game. Upon release, additional music from previous DDR games will be downloadable for the PlayStation 3 and Xbox 360 releases.

=== A Brighter Day ===
"A Brighter Day" is a song by Naoki and features Aleisha G.

=== Be With You (Still Miss You) ===
"Be With You (Still Miss You)" is a song by NC ft. Eddie Kay.

=== Bonafied Lovin' ===
"Bonafied Lovin'" is a song by Chromeo. It is one of four licensed songs ported to Dance Dance Revolution X2, with new difficulty ratings and new charts using both pads.

=== Boogie Wonderland ===
"Boogie Wonderland" is a song by Earth, Wind & Fire. This is the third time the group has been featured in some form in the Dance Dance Revolution series as well as the second time this specific song has appeared. However, it is the first time one of the band's original masters has appeared. The first appearance of this song was sampled in "Wonderland" by X-Treme in Dance Dance Revolution Extreme.

=== Closer ===
"Closer" is a song by Ne-Yo.

=== Crazy Control ===
"Crazy Control" is a song by D-Crew with Val Tiatia.

=== Daft Punk Is Playing at My House ===
"Daft Punk Is Playing at My House" is a song by LCD Soundsystem. This is the second time LCD Soundsystem appeared in a Dance Dance Revolution the first time was in Dance Dance Revolution Hottest Party 2 with "Tribulations (LCD Soundsystem song)." This song was one of four licensed songs ported to Dance Dance Revolution X2, with no changes.

=== Detroit Rock City ===
"Detroit Rock City" is a song by Kiss.

=== Disturbia ===
"Disturbia" is a song by Rihanna. This is the first time a master track of hers and the second time her song is in a Dance Dance Revolution the first time being a cover of "Umbrella" in Dance Dance Revolution Hottest Party 2.

=== Do You Know? (The Ping Pong Song) ===
"Do You Know? (The Ping Pong Song)" is a song by Enrique Iglesias.

=== Dream on Dreamer ===
"Dream on Dreamer" is a song by the Brand New Heavies.

=== Enjoy the Silence ===
"Enjoy the Silence" is a song by Depeche Mode.

=== Feel Good Inc. ===
"Feel Good Inc." is a song by the Gorillaz. Another song by the Gorillaz, "Plastic Beach", is available in Dance Dance Revolution (2010 video game). It is one of four licensed songs ported to Dance Dance Revolution X2, with new difficulty ratings and new charts that used both pads.

=== Freeze ===
"Freeze" is a song by NC ft. NRG Factory.

=== Good Times ===
"Good Times" is a song by Chic. The song was sampled in "Rapper's Delight" by The Sugar Hill Gang which was first featured in Dancing Stage Fusion.

=== Gotta Dance ===
"Gotta Dance" is a song by Naoki feat. Aliesha G.

=== Heatstroke ===
"Heatstroke" is a song by Tag feat. Angie Lee.

=== Hungry Like the Wolf ===
"Hungry Like the Wolf" is a song by Duran Duran.

=== I Know You Want Me (Calle Ocho) ===
"I Know You Want Me (Calle Ocho)" is a song by Pitbull. The song that was sampled in the song, "Street Player" by Chicago, was also sampled in another song in Dance Dance Revolution, "The Bomb (These Sounds Fall Into My Mind)" by The Bucketheads which appeared in Dance Dance Revolution Universe 3.

=== I'm Coming Out ===
"I'm Coming Out" is a song by Diana Ross. A cover version of this song was in Dance Dance Revolution Universe 3 as downloadable content. This is the first appearance of the original version of the song in a Dance Dance Revolution game.

=== Ice Ice Baby ===
"Ice Ice Baby" is a song by Vanilla Ice.

=== Just Dance ===
"Just Dance" is a song by Lady Gaga featuring Colby O'Donis. Another song from Lady Gaga, "Bad Romance", appeared in the 2010 version of Dance Dance Revolution.

=== Kimono Princess ===
"Kimono Princess" is a song by Jun.

=== La Camisa Negra ===
"La Camisa Negra" is a song by Juanes.

=== La Libertad ===
"La Libertad" is a song sung by Cheryl Horrocks.

=== La Receta ===
"La Receta" is a song by Carlos Coco Garcia.

=== Lesson3 by DJ ===
"Lesson3 by DJ" is a song by Dr. DDR.

=== Let's Get It Started ===
"Let's Get It Started" is a song by The Black Eyed Peas. It is the 3rd time the group has been featured in the DanceDanceRevolution series, the 1st being Dance Dance Revolution Ultramix 3 with "Hey Mama" and a 2nd time for Fergie being a cover of "Big Girls Don't Cry" in Dance Dance Revolution X.

=== Love Again ===
"Love Again" is a song by NM feat. Mr. E.

=== My Prerogative ===
"My Prerogative" is a song by Bobby Brown. It is the second time Brown has been featured in the DanceDanceRevolution series, the first being Dance Dance Revolution SuperNova 2 with "Every Little Step".

=== Never Gonna Give You Up ===
"Never Gonna Give You Up" is a song by Rick Astley.

=== One Step at a Time ===
"One Step at a Time" is a song by Jordin Sparks.

=== Paradise ===
"Paradise" is a song by Lea Drop feat. McCall Clark.

=== Pocketful of Sunshine ===
"Pocketful of Sunshine" is a song by Natasha Bedingfield. This is the fourth time Bedingfield has been featured in the DanceDanceRevolution series, with other songs being featured in Dancing Stage Max, Dance Dance Revolution Ultramix 4 and Dance Dance Revolution SuperNova 2.

=== Pork and Beans ===
"Pork and Beans" is a song by Weezer.

=== Praise You ===
"Praise You" is a song by Fatboy Slim.

=== Roppongi EVOLVED ===
"roppongi EVOLVED" is a song by TAG Underground and the final unlockable song of the games. It shares similarities with the other "Evolved" songs in that it has 3 different versions to play, all with differing charts, and each version also has different BPM changes. Version A remains at a constant 170 BPM. Version B drops to 85 BPM for a short while, then goes back to 170 for the remainder of the song. Version C also has a short section of 43 BPM. In the arcade version of Dance Dance Revolution X2, a fourth version, Ver. D, is available, with several stops, double BPM, and half-BPM segments.

=== Sacred Oath ===
"Sacred Oath" is a song by Terra.

=== Shine ===
"Shine" is a song by Tomosuke feat. Adreana.

=== So What ===
"So What" is a song by Pink.

=== South Side ===
"South Side" is a song by Moby featuring Gwen Stefani.

=== The Space Dance ===
"The Space Dance" is a song by Danny Tenaglia.

=== Takin' It to the Sky ===
"Takin' It to the Sky" is a song by U1 and features Tammy S. Hansen.

=== This Night ===
"This Night" is a song by Jun feat. Sonnet.

=== Viva la Vida ===
"Viva la Vida" is a song by Coldplay.

=== What Will Come of Me ===
"What Will Come of Me" is a song by Black Rose Garden.

=== When I Grow Up ===
"When I Grow Up" is a song by Pussycat Dolls. This is the second time The Pussycat Dolls have been featured in the DanceDanceRevolution series, the first being Dance Dance Revolution Ultramix 4 with a remix of "Don't Cha".

=== You Are a Star ===
"You Are a Star" is a song by Naoki feat. Anna Kaelin.

=== You Got It (The Right Stuff) ===
"You Got It (The Right Stuff)" is a song by New Kids on the Block.
