= Dance Dance Revolution X2 (2009 video game) =

- Cover art
- Developer: Konami Computer Entertainment Japan
- Publisher: Konami
- Series: Dance Dance Revolution
- Engine: DDR X
- Platform: PlayStation 2
- Release: NA: October 27, 2009
- Genres: Music, Exercise
- Modes: Single-player, Multiplayer

Dance Dance Revolution X2 is a music video game released by Konami for the North American PlayStation 2. It is the direct sequel to the North American PlayStation 2 release of Dance Dance Revolution X. Released on October 27, 2009 alongside Dance Dance Revolution Hottest Party 3, DDR X2 was one of the first Dance Dance Revolution games released to use songs from the 2009-10 soundtrack. It contains a unique soundtrack, a new master mode, additional modes of play and minor changes and refinements but is otherwise unchanged from its global predecessor Dance Dance Revolution X. It was the final DDR game released for the PlayStation 2.

== Gameplay ==
=== Dice Master Mode ===
Dice Master Mode is a feature in the PlayStation Dance Dance Revolution X2 game. The mode requires you to roll dice and land on a specific space where a mission is placed. The mission will have a sealed envelope if not completed, and an open envelope if it is completed. You start out with a normal 1-6 sided dice, and a second dice which chooses which character will have to move that amount. Starting out with six characters, will you have to move in a dice pattern to unlock more missions, more characters, and more songs.

== Music ==
The music of Dance Dance Revolution X2 consists largely of the licensed songs released across multiple DDR games in North America. In addition a number of Konami Originals that were released in Dance Dance Revolution games globally and a number of returning songs from previous DDR games make up the eclectic collection of music in DDR X2. There seem to be strong nationalism themes in a lot of the track selection.

If players AA the stage "Dance Dance Revolution" (or "RANDOM") as their final stage, it will enable the Extra Stage "KIMONO PRINCESS" - but if the sum of the chart levels for the session reach a certain number (such as 40 for 3 stages), it will enable the Extra Stage "Pluto The First" instead. The Encore Extra Stages then correspond with that.

== See also ==
- Dance Dance Revolution (2010 video game)
- Dance Dance Revolution Hottest Party 3

Preceded by Dance Dance Revolution X	Dance Dance Revolution X2; 2009	Succeeded by Dance Dance Revolution
