= Dance Dance Revolution (disambiguation) =

Dance Dance Revolution and Dance Evolution are music video game series by Konami. These terms may also refer to the following articles.

== Video games ==
- Dance Dance Revolution (1998 video game), a 1998 music arcade game and ported to PlayStation in 1999
- Dancing Stage (video game) also known as Dance Dance Revolution, a 2001 video game for PlayStation
- Dance Dance Revolution (2010 video game), a 2010 game for Wii, PlayStation 3, and Xbox 360
- Dance Dance Revolution (2013 video game), a 2013 music arcade game
- Dance Evolution, a 2010 game for the Xbox 360 and a launch title for the Kinect, known as Dance Masters in North America
  - Dance Evolution Arcade, a 2012 arcade port of Dance Masters

== Others ==
- Dance Dance Revolution (book), an anthology of poems by Cathy Park Hong
- "Evolution of Dance", a series of viral videos by Judson Laipply

== See also ==
- Dance Dance Revelation, a 2010 episode of Modern Family
- Dance Revolution, a 2006 television series based on the video game series
- "DDR (Dance Dance Revolution)", a 2024 single by 6arelyhuman
