= Cuneta =

Cuneta is a surname. Notable people with the surname include:

- Jenn Cuneta, Filipino American singer, actress, and model
- Pablo Cuneta (1910–2000), Filipino politician
- Sharon Cuneta (born 1966), Filipina actress, singer and television host
