= DDR2 =

DDR2 or DDRII may refer to:

- DDR2 SDRAM, the computer memory technology
- Dance Dance Revolution 2ndMix, a 1999 video game
- Dance Dance Revolution II, a 2011 video game
- DDR2 (gene), a human gene
