= This Night =

This Night may refer to:

- This Night (album), a 2002 album by Destroyer
- "This Night" (Booty Luv song) (2012)
- "This Night" (Billy Joel song) (1984)
- "This Night" (Jun song), a 2009 song featured in Dance Dance Revolution Hottest Party 3
- "This Night", a 2007 song by Black Lab from Passion Leaves a Trace
