= Dance Masters =

2010 video game

Dance Evolution
- PAL region cover art. Japanese cover uses similar artwork.
- Developer: Bemani
- Publisher: Konami
- Platforms: Xbox 360, Arcade
- Release: Xbox 360: NA: November 4, 2010; EU: November 10, 2010; AU: November 18, 2010; JP: November 20, 2010; Arcade: JP: March 27, 2012
- Genres: Music, rhythm, exercise
- Modes: Single-player, multiplayer

Dance Masters (stylized as DanceMasters and titled Dance Evolution outside of North America) is a Japanese dancing video game developed by Bemani. The game was unveiled at Konami's E3 2010 press conference, for Xbox 360 Kinect. The game was released in November 2010. It includes 30 tracks, including 28 Konami original songs and two licensed Eurobeat songs. The spin-off Rhythm Party, titled Boom Boom Dance in Japan, was released on the Xbox 360 for the Xbox Live Marketplace on February 1, 2012.

Dance Evolution Arcade was released on March 27, 2012 in Japan as an arcade video game port. Although the gameplay remains the same, and all 28 Konami original songs from the Xbox 360 version return, it has several features that differentiate it with the original version. It uses Windows 7 and the original Kinect for Windows, and it offered e-Amusement functionality. On August 9, 2016, an offline kit for Dance Evolution Arcade was released. This kit allowed the game to run offline, although optional online support remains available indefinitely.

== Music ==
Dance Masters and Dance Evolution for the Xbox 360 feature 28 Konami originals and two licensed songs, for a total of 30 songs.

Dance Masters Songlist
Song	Artist	Note
Licensed songs
"Night of Fire"	Niko	from DS featuring Disney's Rave and Para Para Paradise
"Yesterday"	Cherry	from Para Para Paradise absent from DE Arcade
Konami Originals
"Afronova Primeval" 🔑	8-bit	from Dance Maniax / Dance Freaks and Dance Dance Revolution 5thMix
"A Geisha's Dream"	Naoki featuring Smile.DK	from Dance Dance Revolution Xong
"Baby Baby Gimme Your Love" 🔑	Divas	from Dance Dance Revolution 4thMix
"Brilliant 2U" 🔑	NM	remix of Dance Dance Revolution 2ndMix s
"Burnin' The Floor"	Naoki	from Dance Dance Revolution 4thMix
"Can't Stop Fallin' In Love -super euro version-"	Naoki with Y&Co.	from Para Para Paradise and Dance Dance Revolution SuperNova
"Crazy Control"	D-crew with Val Tiatia	from Dance Dance Revolution X2
"Every Day, Every Night (NM Style)"	Lea Drop featuring Ant Johnston	from Dance Dance Revolution SuperNova 2
"Exotic Ethnic"	RevenG	from DDRMAX Dance Dance Revolution 6thMix
"Higher"	NM featuring Sunny	from Dance Dance Revolution 4thMix
"Hysteria 2001" 🔑	NM	from DDRMAX7 Dance Dance Revolution 7thMix
"Into Your Heart (Ruffage Remix)"	Naoki featuring Yasmine	from Dance Dance Revolution X
"Keep On Movin'"	NM	remix of Dance Dance Revolution 2ndMix song
"Kimono Princess" 🔑	Jun	from Dance Dance Revolution X2
"L'amour et la liberté (Darwin & DJ Silver Remix)"	Naoki in the Mercure	from Dance Dance Revolution SuperNova 2
"La Receta" 🔑	Carlos Coco Garcia	from Dance Dance Revolution X2
"Let the Beat Hit Em'! (Classic R&B Style)"	Stone Bros.	from DDRMAX Dance Dance Revolution 6thMix
"Lover's High"	APHs	from Mamba A Go Go
"Mess With My Emotions"	Latenighter	from Dance Dance Revolution Hottest Party
"My Only Shining Star" 🔑	Naoki featuring Becky Lucinda	from Dance Dance Revolution SuperNova
"My Summer Love" 🔑	Mitsu-O! with Geila	from Dance Dance Revolution 4thMix
"Open Your Eyes"	NM featuring JB Ah-Fua	from Dance Dance Revolution Hottest Party 2
"Sakura"	RevenG	from Dance Dance Revolution Extreme
"Secret Rendez-Vous" 🔑	Divas	from DDRMAX7 Dance Dance Revolution 7thMix
"Still in My Heart"	Naoki	from Dance Dance Revolution 5thMix
"Super Samurai" 🔑	Jun	from Dance Dance Revolution X
"Unity"	The Remembers	from Dance Dance Revolution Hottest Party 2
"We Can Win The Fight"	D-crew featuring Matt Tucker	from Dance Dance Revolution Hottest Party 2

Dance Evolution Arcade features 15 licensed songs and 61 Konami originals, for a total of 76 songs. This includes the 28 Konami originals from the Xbox 360 version, which are fully unlocked in the offline arcade release. Another 19 licensed songs (including "Night of Fire" by Niko) and one Konami original ("Kind Lady" by Okuyatos) were available for online play at arcades, but were removed prior to the release of the offline kit. The offline kit adds the Konami original "Ha・lle・lu・jah" by Sound Holic featuring Nana Takahashi.

== Successors ==
Since the release of Dance Masters and Dance Evolution Arcade, Konami has released two similar dance games: Dance Rush and Dance Around. Dance Rush is available for the general Asian arcade market, while Dance Around is exclusive to Round One Corporation arcades.

=== Dance Around ===
Dance Around, stylized as DANCE aROUND and named after Round One arcades, was first announced on November 10, 2021. It began location tests in select portions of the Japanese market through November 2021. Dance Around uses a pair of cameras mounted on either side of the cabinet to detect the player's body using parallax.

The top half of the game's UI contains a continuously scrolling "Timeline" at the top of the screen, previewing the moves that are coming up, grouped into four-beat groups, similarly to the system in Dance Central.

The bottom part of the game's UI shows prompts representing how the game expects the player to move. Most of the prompts are rounded rectangles that show the areas where the game expects the player's hands and feet to be in or moved into. Occasionally, there will also be trails of dots, along which the player is expected to move either hand, and yellow silhouettes representing full-body poses that the game expects the player to strike. The user's detected hand and foot positions are shown as pink, translucent overlays.

In the background, computer graphics characters perform the dance in real time. By default, there will be three characters, the one in the center being the one chosen by the player. However, if using "Performance Style", the game moves the avatar into a window in the corner, and it mimics the players movements in the real world. This leaves the center area clear, and makes for less clutter on screen.

"Performance Style" unlocks the ability to record the player's movements on certain songs, and play them back on a Web-based interface later. This data is stored for 7 days and can only be watched 10 times.

== Reception and reviews ==
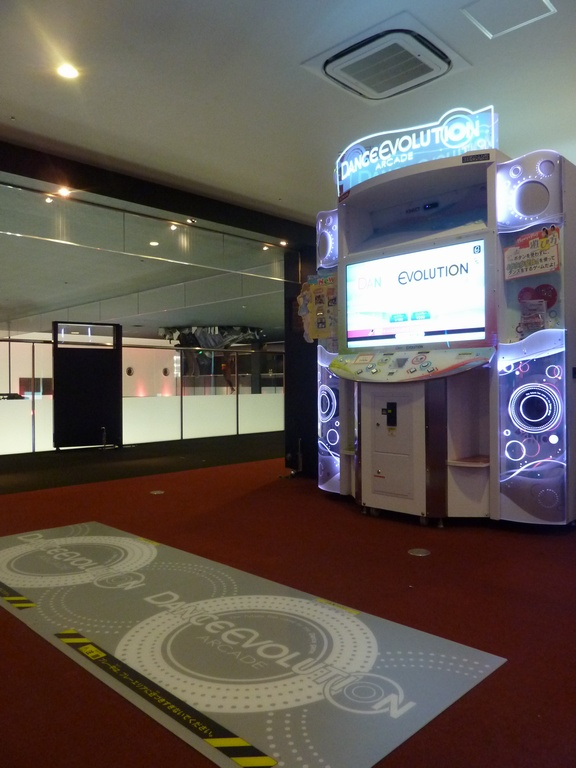
Dance Evolution Arcade

Dance Masters and Dance Evolution for the Xbox 360 had mixed reviews, according to review aggregator Metacritic. IGN was disappointed in their review of the game saying, "DanceMasters is fun enough, especially if you enjoy Dance Dance Revolution and you want a similar Japanese take on the dance genre...but the niche soundtrack and the lack of a proper practice mode make this game difficult to get into...it's also a shame that the move recognition seems unusually lenient at times, but unnecessarily fickle at others...I would recommend Dance Central over DanceMasters any day of the week.

GameSpot said in their review, "though the novel camera feature fuels some goofy fun, DanceMasters only holds lasting appeal for dedicated dance fiends...you'll probably tire of the game shortly after the novelty of the live action camera wears off...though there are better video game dance opportunities available, heading out onto the floor with DanceMasters is still good for a few kicks.
