= Kosuke Saito =

Japanese electronic musician (born 1983)

- Also known as: kors k, teranoid, StripE, Eagle
- Born: December 17, 1983 (age 42); Tokyo, Japan
- Genres: Psytrance, Mainstream hardcore, Schranz, UK hardcore
- Occupations: Composer, music producer
- Instruments: Keyboard, Piano
- Years active: 2000–present
- Labels: S2TB, HOBiRECORDS, avex trax
- Website: Official blog(Japanese)

Kosuke Saito (斉藤広祐, Saitō Kōsuke) (born December 17, 1983), also known as kors k, is a Japanese DJ and music game composer. He is best known for his work in the Bemani series made by Konami. He has produced music under a number of different aliases, such as kors k, Eagle, StripE, and teranoid.

== Career ==
He was influenced early in his career by Tetsuya Komuro, and began to learn to play the synthesizer. Following the popularity of J-pop remixes, he became interested in club music.

Beginning with beatmania IIDX 11 RED, Saito started to use the teranoid name. He stated that he did not wish to be restricted to a certain style of music by his identity, so he used other names for different styles of music. Gradually, he revealed that he also used the names StripE and Eagle in recording songs.

== Known work ==
=== Beatmania IIDX ===
- Clione (beatmaniaIIDX 4th Style)
- traces -tracing you mix- (original song by TaQ Sakakibara) (beatmaniaIIDX 9th Style)
- Love Is Eternity (beatmaniaIIDX 10th Style)
- gigadelic (beatmaniaIIDX 11 IIDXRED)
- HORIZON (beatmaniaIIDX 11 IIDXRED)
- SigSig (beatmaniaIIDX 12 HAPPY SKY)
- ラクエン (beatmaniaIIDX 12 HAPPY SKY)
- Get'em up to R.A.V.E. (beatmaniaIIDX 12 HAPPY SKY)
- tripping contact (beatmaniaIIDX 13 DistorteD)
- ay carumba!!!! (beatmaniaIIDX 13 DistorteD)
- Power of Love (beatmaniaIIDX 13 DistorteD)
- tripping contact (teranoid&MC Natsack Remix) (beatmaniaIIDX 13 DistorteD)
- SOLID STATE SQUAD (with Toshiyuki Kakuta) (beatmaniaIIDX 13 Distorted (PS2))
- FIRE FIRE (beatmaniaIIDX 14 GOLD)
- heaven above (beatmaniaIIDX 14 GOLD)
- the shadow (beatmaniaIIDX 14 GOLD)
- Chain of pain (with Naoyuki Sato) (beatmaniaIIDX 14 GOLD (PS2))
- THE DETONATOR (with Toshiyuki Kakuta) (beatmaniaIIDX 14 GOLD (PS2))
- Rising in the Sun (original mix) (beatmaniaIIDX 15 DJ TROOPERS)
- Now and Forever (beatmaniaIIDX 15 DJ TROOPERS)
- evergreen (beatmaniaIIDX 15 DJ TROOPERS)
- ICARUS (beatmaniaIIDX 15 DJ TROOPERS)
- BRAINSTORM (with Yutaka Yamashita) (beatmaniaIIDX 15 DJ TROOPERS (PS2))
- smooooch･∀･ (beatmaniaIIDX 16 EMPRESS)
- Flash Back 90's (beatmaniaIIDX 16 EMPRESS)
- Programmed World (beatmaniaIIDX 16 EMPRESS)
- THE SHINING POLARIS -kors k mix- (original song by Toshiyuki Kakuta) (beatmaniaIIDX 16 EMPRESS)
- Sunshine Hero (beatmaniaIIDX 16 EMPRESS+PREMIUM BEST (PS2))
- Programmed Sun (beatmaniaIIDX 17 SIRIUS)
- Bad Maniacs (beatmaniaIIDX 17 SIRIUS)
- D (beatmaniaIIDX 17 SIRIUS)
- Bounce Bounce Bounce (beatmaniaIIDX 18 Resort Anthem)
- Programmed Life (beatmaniaIIDX 18 Resort Anthem)
- Kailua (beatmaniaIIDX 18 Resort Anthem)
- Drive Me Crazy (beatmaniaIIDX 19 Lincle)
- Release The Music (beatmaniaIIDX 19 Lincle)
- The Sampling Paradise (beatmaniaIIDX 19 Lincle)
- Echo Of Forever (beatmaniaIIDX 20 Tricoro)
- I know You know (beatmaniaIIDX 20 Tricoro)
- S!ck (beatmaniaIIDX 20 Tricoro)
- New Lights (beatmaniaIIDX 20 Tricoro)
- Insane Techniques (beatmaniaIIDX 21 SPADA)
- Rave Cannon (beatmaniaIIDX 24 Sinobuz)
- Super Rush (beatmaniaIIDX 24 Sinobuz)
- Battleground (beatmaniaIIDX 25 Cannon Ballers)
- Boomy and The Boost (beatmaniaIIDX 25 Cannon Ballers)
- Wonderland (beatmaniaIIDX 26 Rootage)
- Mächö Mönky (beatmaniaIIDX 26 Rootage)
- Rave Patroller (beatmaniaIIDX 27 Heroic Verse)
- Nasty Techniques (beatmaniaIIDX 27 Heroic Verse)
- Pop Team Epic (kors k Remix) (beatmaniaIIDX 27 Heroic Verse)
- Sugar Drippin' (beatmaniaIIDX 27 Heroic Verse)
- ABSOLUTE (kors k Remix) (beatmaniaIIDX 28 Bistrover)
- Empire of Fury (beatmaniaIIDX 28 Bistrover)
- Rub-a Dub-a (beatmaniaIIDX 28 Bistrover)
- Tiempo Loco (beatmaniaIIDX 28 Bistrover)
- kors k's How to make OTOGE CORE (beatmaniaIIDX 29 CastHour)
- Purple Perplex (beatmaniaIIDX 29 CastHour)
- EZ DO DANCE (kors k Remix) (beatmaniaIIDX 30 Resident)
- kors k's How to make OTOGE CORE 「LONG」(beatmaniaIIDX 30 Resident)
- Programmed Genom (beatmaniaIIDX 30 Resident)
- Glitch N Ride (beatmaniaIIDX 31 Epolis)
- Mukade (beatmaniaIIDX 31 Epolis)
- Bring The Fire (beatmaniaIIDX 32 Pinky Crush)
- Bang-Boo Bumble (beatmaniaIIDX 32 Pinky Crush)
- kors k's Let's make an Image Song! (beatmaniaIIDX 33 Sparkle Shower)
- Second Heaven(Mamonis Remix) (beatmaniaIIDX 33 Sparkle Shower)
- ALL OK!! (beatmaniaIIDX Infinitas)
- Fire Beat (beatmaniaIIDX Ultimate Mobile)
- starmine(kors k Remix) (beatmaniaIIDX Ultimate Mobile)

=== Pop'n Music ===
- the keel (Nu-Style Gabba Mix) (original song by Toshihiro Mizuno) (pop'n music 16 PARTY♪)
- 踊るフィーバーロボ Eu-Robot mix (original song by Jun Wakita) (pop'n music 17 THE MOVIE)
- Ge-Ko-Ku-Jo (pop'n music 18 せんごく列伝)
- Remain (with Jun Wakita) (pop'n music 19 TUNE STREET)
- Der Wald (kors k Remix) (original song by Seiya Murai) (pop'n music 20 fantasia)
- Bleep Beep Bop (pop'n music Sunny Park)

=== Dance Dance Revolution ===
- dirty digital (Dance Dance Revolution Universe 3 (Xbox 360))
- Your Angel (vocals; song composed by DM Ashura) (Dance Dance Revolution Universe 3 (Xbox 360))
- oarfish (Dance Dance Revolution Universe 3 (DLC) (Xbox 360))
- ALL MY LOVE (Dance Dance Revolution X2)
- Decade (with Takayuki Ishikawa) (Dance Dance Revolution X2)
- Poseidon (kors k mix) (original song by Naoki Maeda) (Dance Dance Revolution X2)
- Programmed Universe (Dance Dance Revolution X3 VS 2ndMIX)
- PARANOiA (kskst mix) (original song by Naoki Maeda) (Dance Dance Revolution X3 VS 2ndMIX)
- Monkey Business (DanceDanceRevolution (2013) )

=== Guitar Freaks / Drum Mania ===
- Rush!! (GuitarFreaks XG3 / DrumMania XG3) (also on jubeat copious APPEND)

=== Jubeat ===
- Special One (jubeat)
- Shine On Me (jubeat knit)
- The Wind of Gold (jubeat copious APPEND)
- トゲノマユ (original song by Magokoro Ikuta) (jubeat plus)

=== Reflec Beat ===
- Juicy (arrangement; composed by Yoshitaka Nishimura) (REFLEC BEAT)
- Gymnopedie -kors k mix- (original song by Hiroyuki Togo) (REFLEC BEAT)
- Wuv U (REFLEC BEAT)
- Flip Flap (REFLEC BEAT limelight)
- Mind Mapping -kors k mix- (original song by Ryutaro Nakahara) (REFLEC BEAT limelight)
- Our Faith (REFLEC BEAT colette)
- Playing with Fire (REFLEC BEAT colette -Spring-)

=== Marasy8 ===
marasy and kors k collaborated on a series of pieces. Marasy took the piano, while Kosuke did everything else from the synths and drums to the mastering of the tracks.

- Piano Ninja / music marasy
- 踊ル猫曰ク maras k remix / music marasy (odoru neko iwaku)
- Skywards / music kors k
- Twilight / music kors k
- Anemone / music marasy
- Chocolat Swing / music marasy
- Echoes / music kors k
- Rock This / music kors k
- アンラッキーガールちゃんの日録/ music marasy (anrakkiigaaru-chan no nichiroku)
- Play Time!! / music marasy
- Play Time!! Again / music marasy
- Piano Samurai (Appears on Beatmania IIDX 24)

== Discography ==
- Disconation
- teranoid underground edition (partial composition)
- teranoid overground edition (partial composition)
- teranoid overground edition KOJA YUKINO (partial composition)
- teranoid overground edition 1.04 (partial composition)
- teranoid anthems-live@underground (partial composition)
- enigmatic LIA (partial composition)
- enigmatic LIA2 (partial composition)
- teranoid underground edition – For DJs Only Black (partial composition)
- Ways for Liberation
- "Lets Do It Now!"
- "Lets Do It Again!"

== See also ==
- Beatmania IIDX
- Bemani
