= Jenn Cuneta =

Filipino singer

- Origin: Manila, Philippines
- Occupation: Singer
- Years active: 1993–present
- Labels: Ultra, 1998–present
- Website: https://jenncunetaofficial.com

Jenn Cuneta is a Filipino American singer based in New York. Debuting first as J. CEE in 1993, she changed to Jenn Cuneta in 2005. Her 2005 solo single "Come Rain Come Shine", which samples "Silly Love Songs" by Paul McCartney and Wings, reached No. 2 on the Billboard Dance Airplay chart and was featured on Ultra.Weekend and Dance Dance Revolution Hottest Party 2. She is the niece of Sharon Cuneta.

== Discography ==
=== Albums ===
- 2001: Dreaming of Love (Star Records)

=== Singles ===
- 1993: "Hold on Me" (Warlock Records)
- 1994: "Do It for Me" (Rufftrack Records)
- 1995: "What You Do" (Strictly Rhythm)
- 1996: Featured in "Music Is My Life" by Planet Soul (Strictly Rhythm)
- 2000: "Spirit of a Man" (Jellybean Recordings)
- 2001: Featured in "Now We Are Free", theme from the film Gladiator, by Andy & the Lamboy (Tommy Boy Silver Label)
- 2001: "Potion" (Groovilicious)
- 2001: "Freedom" (Jellybean Recordings)
- 2005: "Come Rain Come Shine" (Ultra Music)/Positiva UK
- 2006: "Let Me Take You Away" (Ultra Music)
- 2007: "I Want That Man" (Bill Friar Entertainment)
- 2007: "Sexy to the Bone" – Andy & the Lamboy
- 2009: "Nothing Compares 2 You" (Bill Friar Entertainment)
- 2009: "Where Did You Go" – Andy & the Lamboy
- 2011: "Fifth Day" (Bill Friar Entertainment)
- 2012: "O Holy Night" (Bill Friar Entertainment)
- 2014: "Tonight's Your Night" (7 Stars Music)
- 2017: "The Glamorous Life" (Bill Friar Entertainment)
- 2017: "Quiero Tu Amor" (Sume Music)
- 2018: "Eternal Love" (Fine-Tune Records)

=== Awards and nominations ===
- 2006: Dance Artist of the Year (XM Nation Radio Award – XM Satellite Radio/Sirius)
- 2018: Best Female Pop Vocalist of the World ( WCOPA)
