= DM Ashura =

Bill Shillito
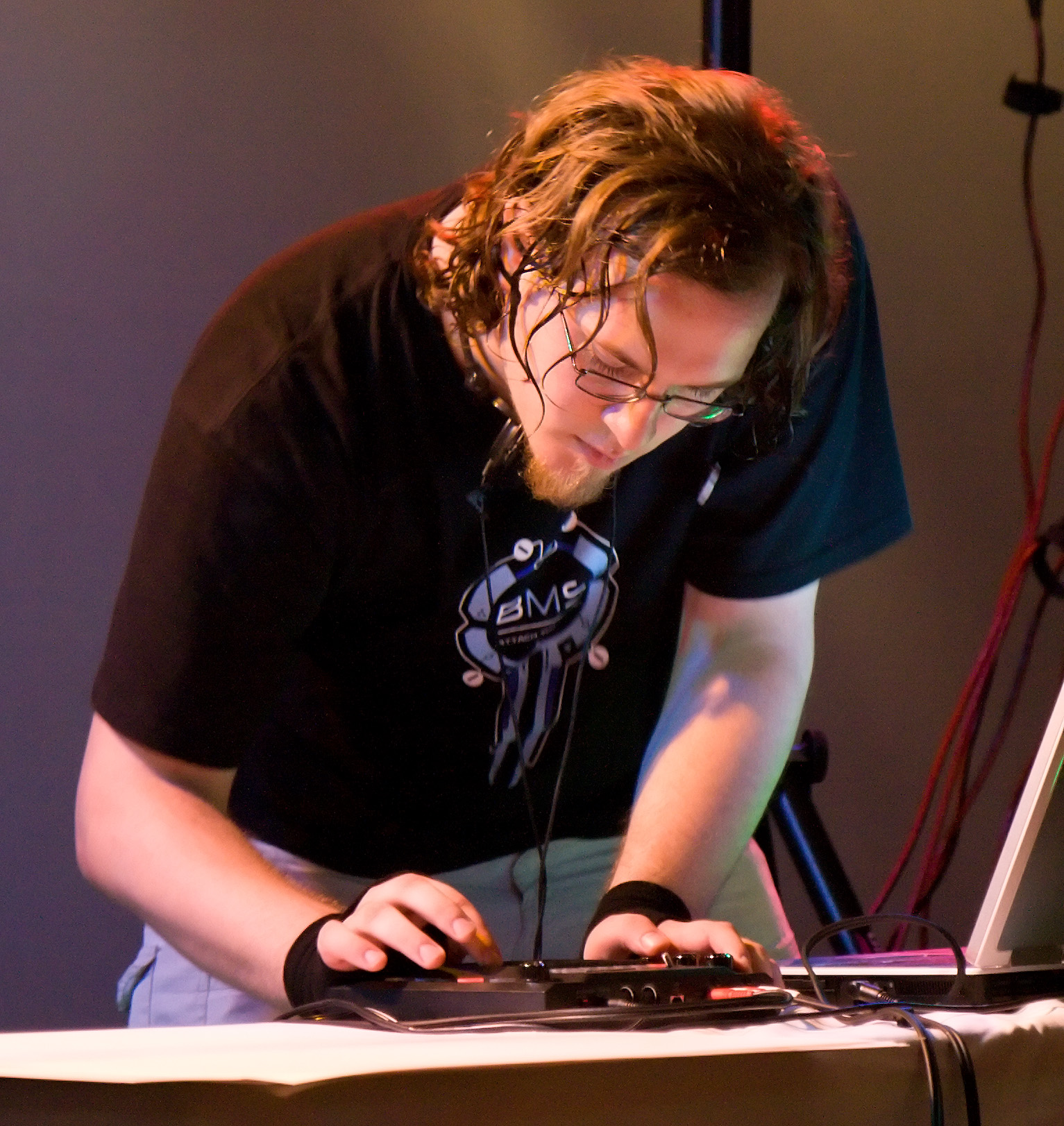
- DM Ashura at San Japan 1.5

Background information
- Also known as: DM Ashura
- Born: William James Robert Shillito; March 26, 1986 (age 40); Brooklyn, New York, US
- Genres: Trance, psychedelic trance, goa, ambient, drum and bass, ethnic, hyper techno
- Occupations: Producer, remixer
- Instruments: Keyboard, Korg Kaoss Pad 3
- Years active: 2002-present
- Website: http://www.dmashura.com/

William "Bill" James Robert Shillito (born March 26, 1986), more commonly known as DM Ashura, is an electronic music remixer, producer, and composer whose work can be found in the music games O2Jam, Dance Dance Revolution, beatmania IIDX, StepMania, Flash Flash Revolution, and Pump it Up.

== Biography ==
DM Ashura lived in Queens for eight years and now resides in Atlanta, Georgia. He started playing piano at the age of two and composing around age eight. He also has played viola since age 12. He graduated from Georgia Tech in 2008 with a Bachelor of Science in international affairs and Japanese; he also speaks Spanish. He started teaching math in 2009 and was working towards a master's degree in Teaching. He has published a YouTube series, "Introduction to Higher Mathematics", and has collaborated on an animated TED video on matrix operations. He is currently a Mathematics Instructor at Oglethorpe University, and has been since 2020.

He creates his music under the name DM Ashura; the "DM" stands for Digital Maestro, while "Ashura" (spelled 阿修羅) is Japanese for "fighting demon". He has made a number of remixes (mostly from music games), particularly "neoMAX" (a remix of the MAX series), which won first place in Tournamix 4, a DDR stepfile-writing contest. He has also since written a number of original tracks, and is well known in the music game community for his work.

== Work in games ==
DM Ashura's music has recently been licensed for a number of music games:

Tracks in O2Jam (for PC):

- "Euphorium"
- "GO!"
- "Astral"

All three of these songs can be found on the Malaysian server. "GO!" can be found on the Japanese server as well.

Tracks in Flash Flash Revolution:

- "KlungKung 2004"
- "Aztec Templing" (Techno-Titlan Mix)
- "AAA"
- "R3" (Omega Mix)
- "Boss Machine"
- "neoMAX"
- "Classical Insanity"
- "MAX Forever"
- "Z"
- "Psychosis"
- "Seven"
- "GO!"
- "MaxX AttaxX*"
- "Otter's Dance" (Hotroot Mix)
- "Vanity Angel" (Seraphim Mix)
- "Chaotic WHITE"
- "Disconnected HaZaRD"

Tracks in Dance Dance Revolution ULTRAMIX 4 (for Xbox)

- "GO!" (Mahalo Mix)
- "Celebrate Nite" (Like It's '99 Mix)

Tracks in Dance Dance Revolution Universe 3 (for Xbox 360)

- "Your Angel"
- "Rave Until The Night Is Over"
- "ΔMAX"
- "aftershock!!"

(Three of these tracks are also featured in the arcade release of Dance Dance Revolution X2, excluding "Rave Until The Night Is Over".)

Tracks in Beatmania IIDX 16: Empress

- "neogenesis"

Tracks in Pump It Up Pro 2 (for Arcade)

- "Allegro Con Fuoco"
- "Chaotic White (vs Enoch)"
- "GO!" (EK Mix)
- "Rave Until The Night Is Over"
- "Rave Until The Night Is Over" (Cyber Trance Mix)
- "X-RaVE"
- "Z -The New Legend-"(Long Version)

Tracks in Pump It Up Fiesta EX (for Arcade)

- "Rave Until The Night Is Over"
- "Allegro Con Fuoco"
- "X-RaVE"

(All of these tracks were previously featured on a spinoff game called Pump It Up Pro.)

Tracks in Pump It Up Infinity (for Arcade)

- "Elise"
- "Ignis Fatuus"
- "Fallen Angel"
- "Euphorium"
- "Z -The New Legend"
- "Pi Rho Maniac"

Tracks in Pump It Up Prime (for Arcade)

- "Allegro Piu Mosso"
- "Annihilator Method"
- "Move That Body!"

Tracks in Pump It Up Prime 2 (for Arcade)

- "Allegro Furioso"

Tracks in Pump It Up XX (20th Anniversary Edition) (for Arcade)

- "Kimchi Fingers" (credited as Garlic Squad)
- "Orbit Stabilizer"

DM Ashura first got his tracks into DDR when he won Konami's music competition on Broadjam.com. His song "GO!" was selected among around 300 other entries. The other three winners were "Grandolin" by Zerofuser, "Race Against Time" by Jeff Steinman, and "There's a Rhythm" by Dig Bear featuring Kat Blu.

== Discography ==
DM Ashura's first album, Digital Maestro, was released in May 2007 at Anime Central. Two of the tracks, "Snowblind" and "Nautilus", feature guitarist Ricky Graham.

"Celebrate Nite (Like It's '99 Mix)" is on Konami's Ultramix 4 V-Rare 11, and the "Cusimo & Co. Extended Mix" is on the Supernova/Ultramix 4 Combo V-Rare 10.
