= Dance Dance Revolution Hottest Party 2 =

2008 video game

- North American cover art
- Developer: Konami
- Publisher: Konami
- Series: Dance Dance Revolution
- Platform: Wii
- Release: NA: September 16, 2008; JP: December 18, 2008; EU: June 26, 2009; AU: July 2, 2009
- Genres: Music, exercise
- Modes: Single-player, multiplayer

Dance Dance Revolution Hottest Party 2, later released as Dance Dance Revolution Furu Furu Party (ダンスダンスレボリューション フルフル♪パーティー, Dansu Dansu Reboryūshon Furu Furu Pātī) in Japan, was announced by Konami on May 15, 2008, as part of the 10th anniversary of Dance Dance Revolution celebration. Hottest Party 2 features the same gameplay as the first Hottest Party and introduces new gameplay modes, gimmicks, characters and graphical enhancements. The game also features an all-new soundtrack featuring licensed music from the past four decades as well as new Konami Originals. Hottest Party 2 was released on September 16, 2008, in North America. A teaser site for the Japanese release was launched on December 9, 2008, featuring new gameplay footage from the game.

== Development ==
A pre-release screenshot of Hottest Party 2 displaying an updated dancing character, classic backup dancers, a more detailed dancing stage and enhanced lighting effect.

Dance Dance Revolution Hottest Party 2 was announced on May 15, 2008, alongside Dance Dance Revolution Universe 3 and Dance Dance Revolution X by Konami on the DDR Online Community website as part of Game Day 2008. A sequel to the 2007 Dance Dance Revolution Hottest Party, Hottest Party 2 features many improvements. Konami promises an entirely new soundtrack featuring music from the "last four decades", more innovative Wii Remote and Nunchuk support, four-player multiplayer and brand new gameplay modes. Hottest Party 2 features a difficulty range that allows both new players and seasoned dancers to enjoy the game. Mii support will be added to the game, allowing players to incorporate their Mii avatars onto the dance floor. Courses, a mode featured in the mainstream Dance Dance Revolution series, will be introduced on the Wii for the first time. Dance gimmicks such as Triple Stomp and Dance N' Defend Battle Mode will add new dynamics to the standard gameplay. New dancing characters will be introduced and the dancers will show off realistic dance moves that players can watch and practice in special mode. New dancing stages with greater detail will be added to the game, more than 50 total environments for the characters to dance in. Konami also announced a sample of the music to be included in Hottest Party 2, including covers of "Black or White" by Michael Jackson, Umbrella" by Rihanna, "We Got the Beat" by The Go-Go's, and the inclusion of Justice's D.A.N.C.E. A teaser trailer and a series of gameplay screenshots were released by Konami alongside the announcement.

On August 1, 2008 The Dance Dance Revolution Hottest Party 2 teaser website was updated with a new trailer revealing additional information about the upcoming game, alongside the new song "Into Your Heart", by series producer Naoki Maeda. The updated dancers with new dance moves are featured, along with the detailed stages featuring club style lighting, video walls and live crowds, new gimmicks that shrink the size of the on-screen arrows to varying degrees, the first appearance of Training Mode on the Wii, Dance N' Defend Battle Mode in action and the 360 degree dancing character viewer.

== Gameplay ==
Gameplay remains relatively unchanged from the original game, as players must step on the marked arrows on a dance pad controller, or wave their Wii Remote or Nunchuck when the corresponding arrow or hand marker passes through a set of static arrows on-screen to the beat of a song. When played with the Wii Remote, a separate "hand combo" attached to the lifebar increases if the player can keep the beat of the song with the controller while in play. These hand combos can add a bonus to the player's score when a hand marker is eventually reached.

New modes on Hottest Party 2 include a battle mode and the "Groove Arena", an updated version of Groove Circuit from the previous version. As with the previous game, songs can also contain special "gimmick" arrows with unique behaviors. New arrow gimmicks on Hottest Party 2 include arrows that rebound when hit and must be hit three times in order for them to fully disappear, and arrows that only appear suddenly.

== Music ==
The songs in yellow are licenses, the songs in white are Konami Originals, the songs in red are "boss songs", and the songs in green are featured in existing games. The songs with padlocks next to them are locked until certain conditions are met in the game, and songs with a clapperboard next to them have music videos featured.

Dance Dance Revolution Hottest Party 2 soundtrack
| Song | Artist | Originally By |
|---|---|---|
| Black or White | Prince Royal | Michael Jackson |
| Makes Me Wonder | Sunshine Superman | Maroon 5 |
| Tribulations | LCD Soundsystem | |
| D.A.N.C.E. | Justice | |
| Everybody Dance | TSMV | Chic |
| You're the One That I Want | Dave V & Taya | John Travolta & Olivia Newton-John |
| All Good Things (Come to an End) | Hamel & Naughty G. | Nelly Furtado |
| Come Rain Come Shine | Jenn Cuneta | |
| I Ran | Spacebar vs. Naughty G. | A Flock Of Seagulls |
| Red Alert | Basement Jaxx | |
| Bust a Move | Young MC | |
| Can't Help Falling in Love | Cut N Edge | Elvis Presley |
| Feel Together | Mickey Disco | Ben Macklin & Tiger Lily |
| My Destiny | Asher | Kim English |
| Nite-Runner | Fraz | Duran Duran featuring Justin Timberlake and Timbaland |
| Obsession | Brooklyn Fire | Animotion |
| Umbrella | Haley Hunt | Rihanna & Jay-Z |
| Walking on Sunshine | The Flash | Katrina and the Waves |
| We Got the Beat | Pop n' Fresh | The Go-Go's |
| I Want Candy | Pop n' Fresh | The Strangeloves |
| Call On Me | Flow | Eric Prydz |
| Don't You (Forget About Me) | NuFoundation | Simple Minds |
| Five O'Clock | Flow | The Perceptionists |
| Scramble | System 7 | |
| Tootsee Roll | The Block Brothers & Hollywood J | 69 Boyz |
| Lesson by DJ | U.T.D & Friends | |
| Lesson2 by DJ | MC DDR | |
| Open Your Eyes | NM feat. JaY_bEe (JB Ah-Fua) | |
| Settin' the Scene | U1 Night Style | |
| Stay (Joey Riot Remix) | Danny D | |
| Unity | The Remembers | |
| Dreamin' | Tomosuke feat. Adreana | |
| My Love | NM feat. Melissa Petty | |
| The Lonely Streets | DJ Yoshitaka feat. Robert "RAab" Stevenson | |
| I Want Your Love (Darwin Remix) | Gav | |
| Escape | U1 & Krystal B | |
| No Matter What | Jun feat. Rita Boudreau | |
| We Can Win the Fight | D-crew feat. Matt Tucker | |
| Into Your Heart (Ruffage Remix) | Naoki feat. Yasmine | |
| Just Believe | Lea Drop feat. Marissa Ship | |
| Loving You (Epidemik Remix) | Toni Leo | |
| Super Hero | DJ Yoshitaka feat. Michaela Thurlow | |
| Desert Journey | DJ Taka | |
| Racing with Time (Naoki's 999 Remix) | Jun feat. Godis (Heather Twede) | |
| Reach the Sky (Orbit1 Remix) | Taya | |
| Closer to my Heart (Jun Remix) | NM feat. Heather Elmer | |
| Habibe (Antuh Muhleke) | Wendy Parr | |
| Somehow You Found Me | Digi-Seq-Band 2000 | |
| Kyoka-Suigetsu-Row (DDR Edition) | Terra feat. Uchusentai Noiz | |
| Silver★Dream | Jun | |
| Osaka Evolved -Maido, Ohkini!- | Naoki Underground | |

Dance Dance Revolution Furu Furu Party soundtrack
| Song | Artist |
|---|---|
| "All Good Things (Come To An End)" | Hamel & Naughty G (Cover of Nelly Furtado) |
| "アナタボシ" | EG-PROJECT |
| "Bigger Than Big (Original Vocal Mix)" | Super Mal feat. Luciana |
| "Black or White" | Prince Royal (Cover of Michael Jackson) |
| "Break the Chain" | Tourbillon |
| "Bust a Move" | Young MC |
| "Can't Help Falling In Love With You" | Cut N Edge (Cover of Elvis Presley) |
| "CRAZY GONNA CRAZY" | TRF |
| "炎神戦隊ゴーオンジャー" | EG-PROJECT |
| "HOUSE NATION feat. LISA" | ravex |
| "I Ran" | Spacebar vs. Naughty G (Cover of A Flock Of Seagulls) |
| "Makes Me Wonder" | Sunshine Superman (Cover of Maroon 5) |
| "Our Song" | Shinichi Osawa |
| "Purple Line" | 東方神起 |
| "Superstar" | tomboy |
| "Umbrella" | Haley Hunt (Cover of Rihanna & Jay-Z) |
| "resonance" | NAOKI-EX (Cover of T.M.Revolution) |
| "Walking on Sunshine" | The Flash (Cover of Katrina and the Waves) |
| "We Got The Beat" | Pop n' Fresh (Cover of The Go-Go's) |
| "Brilliant 2U" | NAOKI |
| "CELEBRATE NIGHT" | NAOKI |
| "FREE" | NM PRESENTS (Cover of Song Freedom by BeForU) |
| "Lesson by DJ" | U.T.D. & Friends |
| "Lesson2 by DJ (Japanese Version)" | MC DDR |
| "Keep on movin'" | NM |
| "NO CRIME" | SHANADOO |
| "Closer to my Heart (jun remix)" | NM feat. Heather Elmer |
| "Desert Journey" | dj TAKA |
| "Dreamin'" | TOMOSUKE feat. Adreana |
| "escape" | U1 & Krystal B |
| "Habibe (Antuh muhleke)" | Wendy Parr |
| "I WANT YOUR LOVE (Darwin remix)" | GAV |
| "INTO YOUR HEART (Ruffage remix)" | NAOKI feat. YASMINE |
| "JUST BELIEVE" | Lea Drop feat. Marissa Ship |
| "鏡花水月楼 (DDR EDITION)" | TЁЯRA feat. 宇宙戦隊NOIZ |
| "LOVING YOU (Epidemik remix)" | TONI LEO |
| "My Love" | NM feat. Melissa Petty |
| "No Matter What" | jun feat. Rita Boudreau |
| "Open Your Eyes" | NM feat. JaY_bEe (JB Ah-Fua) |
| "Racing with Time （NAOKI's 999 remix）" | jun feat.Godis (Heather Twede) |
| "REACH THE SKY (Orbit1 remix)" | TAYA |
| "Settin' the Scene" | U1 night style |
| "Somehow You Found Me" | DIGI-SEQ-BAND2000 |
| "STAY (Joey Riot remix)" | DANNY D |
| "SUPER HERO" | DJ YOSHITAKA feat. Michaela Thurlow |
| "The Lonely Streets" | DJ Yoshitaka feat. Robert "RAab" Stevenson |
| "Unity" | The Remembers |
| "We Can Win the Fight" | D-crew feat. Matt Tucker |
| "osaka EVOLVED -毎度、おおきに！-" | NAOKI underground |
| "SILVER☆DREAM" | jun |

=== Soundtrack album ===
The original soundtrack for FuruFuru Party was bundled with the original soundtrack for Dance Dance Revolution X, and was released on January 29, 2009. It was part of the pre-order bundles for the PlayStation 2 version of DDR X in Japan, which was released the same day.

== Compatibility ==
It has been discovered that DDR Hottest Party 2 is not compatible with some 3rd party dance mats made for Dance Dance Revolution Mario Mix and 3rd party mats made for Dance Dance Revolution Hottest Party. Cable converters, such as those made by DDR Game, exist to get around this issue. It is compatible with most GameCube pads, even when used as 2nd/3rd/4th player.

== Reception ==
A pre-release screenshot of Hottest Party 2 displaying a Mii as a dancing character.

Reception

Aggregate score
| Aggregator | Score |
|---|---|
| Metacritic | 69/100 (8 reviews) |

During its presentation at E3 2008, critics praised Hottest Party 2 for its ease of play. Chris Watters of GameSpot felt the training modes would be useful for newer players to learn the game's fundamentals, and while IGN's Lucas M. Thomas noted that Hottest Party 2 was not "drastically different" from the previous version (continuing a model of releasing yearly installments with greater emphasis on new content rather than making larger changes to the game), he still felt the game remained just as accessible to new players as earlier entries in the franchise, and sarcastically commented that the ability to have Mii heads on realistic bodies as dancers "doesn't look disturbing at all."

1UP.com gave Hottest Party 2 a "B" rating, concluding that the game "succeeds in several areas where last year's version fell short." Specific praise went to its use of full choreography for the on-screen characters rather than randomized moves, and to its soundtrack contained fewer "generic" songs than the previous game. The game's Battle mode was considered to be a "positively nightmarish" experience, and the Groove Arena mode was singled out for providing a "rewarding sense of progress" through its pace of providing new content.

WorthPlaying.com's Jesse Littlefield gave the game a 6.6/10, complimenting some of the additions to gameplay and Wii Remote support. However, the stages and characters were dubbed "poorly detailed" and the covered songs were declared to be "sub-standard", although the Konami Originals were considered the "better half" of the soundtrack. The lack of online play was also criticized.

== See also ==
- Dance Dance Revolution Hottest Party
- Dance Dance Revolution Winx Club

| Preceded by Dance Dance Revolution Hottest Party | Dance Dance Revolution Hottest Party 2; 2008 | Succeeded by Dance Dance Revolution Hottest Party 3 |
