= Dance Dance Revolution Universe 3 =

2008 video game

- The cover art for the Chinese Music Special Edition uses a silhouette in place of the model on the original cover art.
- Developer(s): Hudson Soft
- Publisher(s): Konami
- Series: Dance Dance Revolution
- Engine: Custom
- Platform(s): Xbox 360
- Release: NA: October 21, 2008; CHN: May 12, 2009
- Genre(s): Music, exercise
- Mode(s): Single-player, multiplayer

Dance Dance Revolution Universe 3, sometimes abbreviated as DDR Universe 3, is a video game for Xbox 360. It was announced by Konami on May 15, 2008, and released on October 21, 2008. The game has new songs, a story mode, the ability to create custom songs and custom character creation.

Dance Dance Revolution Universe 3 Chinese Music Special Edition (熱舞革命宇宙3 中文曲特别版 Rèwǔ Gémìng Yǔzhòu sān Zhōngwén qū Tèbié Bǎn) is a special release of Dance Dance revolution 3 by Konami for the Xbox 360 in the Asian region. It was released on May 12, 2009, as a stand-alone game and a bundle containing a dance pad controller. Universe 3 Chinese Music Special Edition is based on the North American release of Dance Dance Revolution Universe 3 with 21 additional songs added to the game. The new music is localized to Hong Kong and Taiwanese artists and groups.

== Development ==
Dance Dance Revolution Universe 3 Chinese Music Special Edition was announced in late 2008 by Konami Digital Entertainment Limited, Konami's Hong Kong based subsidiary. An official site was launched stating that Chinese Music Special Edition would contain 60 English songs in addition to 20 exclusive Chinese pop songs from Hong Kong and Taiwan. The game was originally intended to be released before Christmas of 2008 and was delayed until May 2009.

== Gameplay ==
Dance Dance Revolution Universe 3 Chinese Music Special Edition will include the standard Dance Dance Revolution gameplay formula as well as new features first introduced in Dance Dance Revolution Universe 3 released in North America in 2008.

=== DJ mode ===
DJ mode allows players to edit the music included in the game to create their own mixes.

=== Quest mode ===
First seen in Dance Dance Revolution Ultramix 4, Quest mode lets players travel from locale to locale competing in dance offs with computer controlled dancers. As players progress through their quest, new songs and other items are unlocked for use in-game.

=== Edit Mode ===
Edit Mode allows players to make their own steps for a chosen song or make a video background for a chosen song.

== Music ==
Songs in bold represent specialized record company licensing. Songs highlighted in red denote "boss songs" with expert/oni difficulties rated a 10.

Song	Artist	Other information
New licensed songs
"A Fifth Of Beethoven"	Walter Murphy and the Big Apple Band	from the album A Fifth of Beethoven
"Alice"	Moby	from the album Last Night
"**All Over Again**"	Blu Mar Ten	A Different Drum license
"Bad Taste"	The Divys	Exclusively licensed song
"The Bomb (These Sounds Fall Into My Mind)"	The Bucketheads	from the album All in the Mind
"Canned Heat"	Jamiroquai	from the album Synkronized
"Conga"	Miami Sound Machine	from the album Primitive Love
"Dancing Machine"	Jackson 5	from the album G.I.T.: Get It Together
"Doki Doki (Panik Mix)"	smile.dk	from the "Doki Doki" CD single
"Gutterpunk"	Noisia feat. Bex Riley	from the "Gutterpunk" CD single
"If (Dave Aude Remix)"	Colette	from the "If" CD single
"Man With The Hex"	Atomic Fireballs	from the album Birth of the Swerve
"**Over**"	Mark Hill Presents Kelly Marie	Avex HOUSE NATION license
"parade"	Witchery SKANK	from the album Cherish!!
"**Return of the Machines (Radio Mix)**"	Oforia feat. Bwicked	A Different Drum license
"Watch Us Work It"	Devo	"Watch Us Work It" digital release
Konami collaboration tracks
"**30 Lives (Up-Up-Down-Dance Mix)**"	The Motion Sick	DDR Original Song Contest winner
"Burn Out"	Beatdrop	Commissioned song
"Caught In the Moment"	Entona	Commissioned song
"Dancin' My Way"	DeeJayz Paradize feat. Thomas Howard	Commissioned song
"**Don't Don't Go Away (Ricardo Autobahn Remix)**"	Foxxie	Disko Warp Music license
"freshmagicgroove"	IKAAN.fresh!	Commissioned song
"**Less Than Three (Ricardo Autobahn Remix)**"	Becky	Disko Warp Music license
"Rave Until the Night is Over (Universe Edit)"	DM Ashura feat. MC Jay & Weronica	Commissioned song
"**Till The Lonely's Gone**"	Z-licious	DDR Original Song Contest winner
"Time To Move"	Fcdeejay	Commissioned song
"Waiting For You"	C-14	Commissioned song
New Konami originals
"aftershock!!"	DM Ashura	New Konami original song
"Angel"	Master Source	New Konami original song
"Big City Lights"	Big Idea	New Konami original song
"Come Back"	Gein	New Konami original song
"Consuela"	Captain.T	New Konami original song
"CONTROL (The Attic Remix)"	90 GROOVERS	New Konami original song
"dirty digital"	kors k	New Konami original song
"Dummy"	RAM	New Konami original song
"EtoSharu"	oo39.com	New Konami original song
"Feel The Beat"	Master Source	New Konami original song
"Hey, What's Your Name"	Big Idea	New Konami original song
"HOLD YOU IN MY ARMS (Danceforze dream mix)"	NM feat. Asher	New Konami original song
"Inspiration"	Togo Project feat. Mayumi	New Konami original song
"Just Pretend"	Big Idea	New Konami original song
"KEEP ON MOVING (Orbit1 remix)"	D'n'B Stars	New Konami original song
"Kimochi"	NAOKI feat. Melody & Mezzo	New Konami original song
"L.A. EVOLVED"	NAOKI underground	New Konami original song
"Lament Configuration"	Rephaim	New Konami original song
"Less Is More"	lim's Sculpture	New Konami original song
"My Hero"	In Geer	New Konami original song
"NRG Surge"	oo39.com	New Konami original song
"ONCE UPON A TIME (Jertz mix)"	Mitsu-O! Summer 2008	New Konami original song
"Out of Decaf"	NEKOJIRA	New Konami original song
"sakura storm"	Ryu☆	New Konami original song
"senses (Kaiju Remix)"	JT.1UP	New Konami original song
"Streamline"	Karuto	New Konami original song
"Tesla Coil"	Rephaim	New Konami original song
"Your Angel"	DM Ashura feat. kors k	New Konami original song
"Akibarrific"	Ko Kimura	New Konami original song
"ΔMAX" (delta MAX)	DM Ashura	New Konami original song
"888"	DJ TECHNORCH	New Konami original song
New BEMANI crossovers and DDR revivals
"100 Sec. Kitchen Battle!!"	Orange Lounge	from Pop'n Music
"777"	EeL	from GuitarFreaks/DrumMania
"Absolute"	dj TAKA	from DDR 5th MIX
"Kind Lady"	OKUYATOS	from DDRMAX
"MATSURI JAPAN"	RE-VENGE	from DDR 5th MIX
"Midnight Blaze (SySF Mix)"	System S.F.	from DDRMAX (ending credits)
"MOBO*MOGA"	Orange Lounge	from DDR EXTREME
"PARANOiA Rebirth"	190'	from DDR 3rd MIX
"Concertino In Blue"	Hirofumi Sasaki	from GuitarFreaks/DrumMania
"murmur twins"	yu_tokiwa.djw	from DDR SuperNOVA
Downloadable songs
"Celebration"	wavegroup	Kool and the Gang cover song, original version later used in DanceDanceRevolution
"Glamorous"	Somatone	Fergie cover song
"I'm Coming Out"	Somatone	Diana Ross cover song, original version later used in Dance Dance Revolution Hottest Party 3
"Irreplaceable"	wavegroup	Beyoncé cover song
"What Is Love?"	Somatone	Haddaway cover song
"39th St. Strut"	oo39.com	New Konami original song
"Dance Till The Sun Come Up"	Big Idea	New Konami original song
"HIT THE GROUND" (Alexa Remix)	NAOKI	New Konami original song
"Jewelya Of De' Nile	Big Idea"	New Konami original song
"Lady Be Good To Me"	In Geer	New Konami original song
"Musk Up"	The Blue Light Specialists	New Konami original song
"oarfish"	kors k	New Konami original song
"Rhythm Of My Heart"	Master Source	New Konami original song
"vertical"	Ryu*	New Konami original song
"You're Such a Shredder"	In Geer	New Konami original song
"A Dream"	Big Idea	New Konami original song
"koibana"	Togo Project feat. Manna	New Konami original song

Songs mentioned on the back of the box but not available in the game:

- "It Takes Two" Rob Base & DJ E-Z Rock
- "Shake Your Groove Thing" Peaches & Herb
- "Sweet Dreams (Are Made of This)" Eurythmics
- "Tainted Love" Soft Cell
- "Harder, Better, Faster, Stronger" Daft Punk

For the regional release of Dance Dance Revolution Universe 3 Chinese Music Special Edition, Konami added music from local artists. The song list from the North American release of Dance Dance Revolution Universe 3 remains in addition to the new music.

Dance Dance Revolution Universe 3 Chinese Music Special Edition soundtrack
No.	Song	Artist
1	"Wan Mei" (Pulchritude)	Jolin Tsai
2	"Jin Xing Shi"	Elva Hsiao & Anson Hu
3	"Huang Di"	Anson Hu
4	"Big City"	A-Mei
5	"Hua Die Fei"	The Flowers
6	"Yin Wei Ai"	Elva Hsiao
7	"Wo Shi Ni De Shui"	Stanley Huang
8	"Shi Jie Zhi You Wo"	Stanley Huang
9	"Xia Ri Chu Ti Yan"	Lollipop
10	"Kao Jin Ni"	B.A.D.
11	"Tan Chen Chi"	Yung Joey
12	"Du Zhao"	Yung Joey
13	"Pu Guang"	Tse Nicholas
14	"Di Er Shi"	Tse Nicholas
15	"Bu La Ge Zhi Lian"	Twins
16	"Cuo Zai Cong Ming"	Twins
17	"Ni Bu Shi Hao Qing Ren"	Twins
18	"Say Love Me"	Kwan Kenny
19	"Fu Hua Luan Shi"	Ng Deep
20	"Zhao Zi Ji"	Chan Vincy

== Reception ==
Reception

Aggregate score
Aggregator	Score
Metacritic	65/100

Review score
Publication	Score
IGN	5/10

Dance Dance Revolution Universe 3 received "mixed or average reviews" according to the review aggregator Metacritic.

Preceded by Dance Dance Revolution Universe 2	Dance Dance Revolution Universe 3; 2008	Succeeded by Dance Dance Revolution
