= Dance Dance Revolution Hottest Party =

2007 video game

- North American cover art
- Developer: Konami
- Publisher: Konami
- Series: Dance Dance Revolution
- Platform: Wii
- Release: NA: September 25, 2007; JP: October 25, 2007; EU: March 28, 2008; AU: April 17, 2008
- Genre: Music
- Modes: Single-player, multiplayer

Dance Dance Revolution Hottest Party (Note: Japanese: ダンスダンスレボリューションホッテストパーティー, Hepburn: Dansu Dansu Reboryūshon Hottesuto Pātī), known as Dancing Stage Hottest Party in the European and Oceanic regions, is a music video game developed and published by Konami for the Wii. It is a spin-off of the Dance Dance Revolution series, incorporating the Wii Remote and the standard dance pad into a full body motion game. It was followed by two sequels, Dance Dance Revolution Hottest Party 2 and Dance Dance Revolution Hottest Party 3.

== Gameplay ==
The Gameplay is largely unchanged from other Dance Dance Revolution games. However, the game features additional modes taking advantage of the hardware of the Wii. The game allows the integration of the Wii Remote into gameplay, where steps can be replaced by markers requiring a hand motion with the remote. Other step types include steps which must be hit twice.

Hottest Party includes a single player mode (Groove Circuit and free play), and Workout Mode. Free play gives the players a free choice of songs, which can be played in Sync mode (several players play the same chart, and only the lowest step judgment on each arrow will count), and Friendship mode (where the highest step judgment is counted). In Groove Circuit, players will play through venues and different groups of songs. At the end of each venue, a boss battle will start. There are challenges for each dance, as well. The game supports multiplayer which requires four dance mats for each player.

In Friendship Mode, the highest step judgement is counted for all players

== Music ==
The soundtrack of Dance Dance Revolution Hottest Party differs in the Japanese release. "B4U (The Acolyte Mix)", "Gonna Make You Sweat (Everybody Dance Now)", "Rhythm is a Dancer" and "Unappreciated" are only featured in the North American/European/Oceanic release. "B4U (Rising Sun Mix)", "Double Tornard", "Pluto the First" and "True♥Love (Clubstar's True Club Mix)" are included in their place. All of the Japanese exclusives except "B4U (Rising Sun Mix)" were made available in later DDR console releases, such as Hottest Party 3 and DDR 2010. "Lessons by DJ" in the Japanese release has Japanese language voice overs during the song, whereas all other releases have English voice overs.

Dance Dance Revolution Hottest Party soundtrack (Japan)
No.	Song	Artist	Originally by
1	"1, 2 Step"	Lady-S	Ciara
2	"Clocks"	T.R.Master MC	Coldplay
3	"Yo, Excuse Me Miss"	Smooth-1	Chris Brown
4	"Always (Microbots Trance Dance Mix)"	Man's Cool	Erasure
5	"Lips of an Angel"	Jet Rockers	Hinder
6	"Summertime"	Eazin'	DJ Jazzy Jeff & The Fresh Prince
7	"Blue Monday"	WG	New Order
8	"Caught Up"	Stopped Cold	Usher
9	"Gypsy Woman"	Neo-Gruv	Crystal Waters
10	"I Don't Feel Like Dancin'"	Life Aloud	Scissor Sisters
11	"Little L"	Single Funk	Jamiroquai
12	"The Sign"	Honey Sweets	Ace of Base
13	"Disco Inferno"	OK•OK•OK	The Trammps
14	"Far Away"	Traveler	Nickelback
15	"Nothing But You"	Trance Jack	Paul van Dyk
16	"You Spin Me ‘Round (Like a Record)"	M.A.N	Dead or Alive
18	"Too Little, Too Late"	PFC	JoJo
19	"Buried a Lie"	Cools K	Senses Fail
19	"Finally"	Club 90's	CeCe Peniston
20	"Karma Chameleon"	Happy Happy Cores	Culture Club
21	"Hot Stuff"	Disco Queen	Donna Summer
22	"Call on Me"	2000's Stars	Janet Jackson featuring Nelly
23	"99 Red Balloons"	M-Crew project	Nena
24	"Lesson by DJ"	U.T.D & Friends	
25	"Touchin'"	The Lonely Hearts	
26	"Let It Out"	True Dreamer	
27	"Here I Go Again"	NM feat. Malaya	
28	"True♥Love (Clubstar's True Club Mix)"	Jun feat. Schanita	
29	"Will"	Naoki	
30	"Beautiful Inside (Cube::Hard Mix)"	NM feat. Alison Wade	
31	"Heavens and the Earth"	The Lonely Hearts	
32	"Moving On"	J.J. Pops	
33	"B4U (Rising Sun Mix)"	Naoki with J-Ravers	Naoki
34	"Such a Feeling"	U1	
35	"Confession"	Trance Star	
36	"The Reason"	Black Rose Garden	
37	"Hold Tight"	800 Slopes	
38	"Double Tornard"	Evo-X	
39	"Mess With My Emotions"	Latenighter	
40	"Little Steps"	Freeman	
41	"The Beat"	Sparky	
42	"Break Down! (World Version)"	Ele Rocks	BeForU
43	"Candy (UFO Mix)"	The Sweetest	Luv Unlimited
44	"We Will Live Together"	Happy CoreMan	
45	"1998 (Sparky 2006)"	J-Ravers	Naoki
46	"I'm Flying Away"	Stepper	
47	"Love Shine (Body Grooverz 2006 Mix)"	W.W.S	Riyu Kosaka
48	"Super Samurai"	Jun	
49	"TokyoEvolved"	NaokiUnderground	
50	"Pluto the First"	White Wall	

Dance Dance Revolution Hottest Party soundtrack (North America, Europe & Oceania)
No.	Song	Artist	Originally by
1	"1, 2 Step"	Lady-S	Ciara
2	"Clocks"	T.R.Master MC	Coldplay
3	"Yo, Excuse Me Miss"	Smooth-1	Chris Brown
4	"Always (Microbots Trance Dance Mix)"	Man's Cool	Erasure
5	"Lips of an Angel"	Jet Rockers	Hinder
6	"Summertime"	Eazin'	DJ Jazzy Jeff & The Fresh Prince
7	"Blue Monday"	WG	New Order
8	"Caught Up"	Stopped Cold	Usher
9	"Gypsy Woman"	Neo-Gruv	Crystal Waters
10	"I Don't Feel Like Dancin'"	Life Aloud	Scissor Sisters
11	"Little L"	Single Funk	Jamiroquai
12	"The Sign"	Honey Sweets	Ace of Base
13	"Disco Inferno"	OK•OK•OK	The Trammps
14	"Far Away"	Traveler	Nickelback
15	"Nothing But You"	Trance Jack	Paul van Dyk
16	"You Spin Me ‘Round (Like a Record)"	M.A.N	Dead or Alive
17	"Too Little, Too Late"	Okokoro	JoJo
18	"Buried a Lie"	Cools K	Senses Fail
19	"Finally"	Club 90's	CeCe Peniston
20	"Gonna Make You Sweat (Everybody Dance Now)"	Rave Attackers	C+C Music Factory
21	"Unappreciated"	Wrapped Up	Cherish
22	"Rhythm Is a Dancer"	Spots	Snap!
23	"Karma Chameleon"	Happy Happy Cores	Culture Club
24	"Hot Stuff"	Disco Queen	Donna Summer
25	"Call on Me"	2000's Stars	Janet Jackson featuring Nelly
26	"99 Red Balloons"	M-Crew project	Nena
27	"Lesson by DJ"	U.T.D & Friends	
28	"Touchin'"	The Lonely Hearts	
29	"Let It Out"	True Dreamer	
30	"Here I Go Again"	NM feat. Malaya	
31	"Will"	Naoki	
32	"Beautiful Inside (Cube::Hard Mix)"	NM feat. Alison Wade	
33	"Heavens and the Earth"	The Lonely Hearts	
34	"Moving On"	J.J. Pops	
35	"B4U (The Acolyte Mix)"	J-Ravers	Naoki
36	"Such a Feeling"	U1	
37	"Confession"	Trance Star	
38	"The Reason"	Black Rose Garden	
39	"Hold Tight"	800 Slopes	
40	"Mess With My Emotions"	Latenighter	
41	"Little Steps"	Freeman	
42	"The Beat"	Sparky	
43	"Break Down! (World Version)"	Ele Rocks	BeForU
44	"Candy (UFO Mix)"	The Sweetest	Luv Unlimited
45	"We Will Live Together"	Happy CoreMan	
46	"1998 (Sparky 2006)"	J-Ravers	Naoki
47	"I'm Flying Away"	Stepper	
48	"Love Shine (Body Grooverz 2006 Mix)"	W.W.S	Riyu Kosaka
49	"Super Samurai"	Jun	
50	"TokyoEvolved"	NaokiUnderground	

== Reception ==
Reception

Aggregate score
Aggregator	Score
Metacritic	73/100

Review scores
Publication	Score
GameSpot	5.5/10
GamesRadar+	3.5/5
GameZone	7/10
IGN	7/10
Nintendo World Report	8.5/10

The game has received generally mixed reviews. Many reviews agree the hand motions freshen the DDR experience and are a positive addition to the game.

== Notes ==
Preceded by nothing	Dance Dance Revolution Hottest Party; 2007	Succeeded by Dance Dance Revolution Hottest Party 2
