= Dance Dance Revolution X =

2008 video game

- North American PlayStation 2 cover art
- Developer: Bemani
- Publisher: Konami
- Series: Dance Dance Revolution
- Platforms: PlayStation 2, Arcade
- Release: PlayStation 2: NA: September 16, 2008; JP: January 29, 2009; Arcade: JP: December 24, 2008; EU: June 3, 2009; NA: June 9, 2009
- Genres: Music, exercise
- Modes: Single-player, multiplayer
- Arcade system: Bemani PC Type 4 (Windows XP Embedded)

Dance Dance Revolution X (Note: known in Japan as Dance Dance Revolution X (ダンスダンスレボリューションX, Dansu Dansu Reboryūshon Ekkusu)) is a music video game developed by Konami. A part of the Dance Dance Revolution series, it was announced in 2008 for Japan and on May 15, 2008, for the North American PlayStation 2. The arcade version was announced on July 7, 2008, July 9, 2008 in Europe, and July 10, 2008, for North America. Released to celebrate the 10th anniversary of Dance Dance Revolution, DDR X sports an improved interface, new music, and new modes of play. The arcade release featured an overhauled (second generation) cabinet design with a widescreen display, e-Amusement and USB access, and an improved sound system. Despite such new design of its arcade cabinet, upgrade kit to change the edition of DDR on its first generation arcade cabinet from SuperNOVA2 (or earlier) to X is also available. The PlayStation 2 release has link ability with the arcade machine, multi-player support over LAN, and other improved and returning features such as EyeToy support. DDR X was called a "truly global version", with a multi-regional release by all three major Konami houses.

== Development ==
A pre-release screenshot of Dance Dance Revolution X demonstrating new visual and character designs as well as the game's "urban" theme

=== PlayStation 2 ===
Konami announced the development of Dance Dance Revolution X on May 15, 2008, alongside Dance Dance Revolution Universe 3 and Dance Dance Revolution Hottest Party 2. DDR X is intended to be released as part of the 10th anniversary of Dance Dance Revolution. Konami promised that at least 70 songs would be featured in this release and that DDR X would bring with it enhanced graphics and new modes of play. Also promised was LAN multi-player support for up to 8 players, an upgraded Workout Mode that will allow players to build their own regimen, new dancing characters and the return of existing features such as EyeToy support.

On the same day, Konami released gameplay preview images and video that showcased new graphical content. Three songs, two that had previously premiered on SuperNOVA 2 and its Japanese PS2 version (Poseidon and TimeHollow) and one that was new to the Dance Dance Revolution series, "Taj He Spitz", were also displayed in this media.

During the E3 gaming convention on July 15, 2008, additional information was revealed about the North American PlayStation 2 game, announcing that Dance Dance Revolution X would feature classic gameplay as well as new gameplay. The difficulty rating scale was extended resulting in existing songs in the series being re-rated to compensate. The Shock Arrow feature was also playable. Previously licensed music from earlier DDR series has returned including Me & My's "Dub-I-Dub" and Smile.dk's "Butterfly". GameSpot's reporters announced that the game was expected to be released sometime during Fall 2008. Additionally, new gameplay screenshots were revealed at the same time showcasing new features like new and returning dancing characters, a new Workout Mode, LAN network gameplay and returning modes such as Battle, Edit, Training and Street Master Mode. A successor to the previous Master Modes, Street Master Mode is akin to Quest Mode from Dance Dance Revolution Ultramix 3. Moving across a map, players guide themselves from one dance challenge to the next, meeting new characters and visiting different locales along the way.

The game was released on September 16, 2008. In addition to the aforementioned features, the PS2 version also contains "Xmixes", several nonstop mixes containing several songs each.

=== Arcade ===
On July 7, 2008, following a redesign of the Dance Dance Revolution Global Gateway, Konami of Japan announced that Dance Dance Revolution X would be released as an arcade and PlayStation 2 title in Japan as well. Shortly thereafter, on July 9, 2008, Konami sent out a press release to DDRUK (a DDR and music gaming fan community, with a particular emphasis on the European market) that said DDR X would be a "truly global version", mentioning that the Dancing Stage name would be dropped in favor of Dance Dance Revolution, confirming the game's pending release in Europe as an arcade title. The press release went on to say that the arcade cabinet and hardware would get a fresh, new look and feel. Naoki Maeda, one of the sound producers for the Bemani series, pointed out on his TËЯRA blog that repeated requests from the fans of DDR were partially responsible for the decision to redesign the game's hardware.

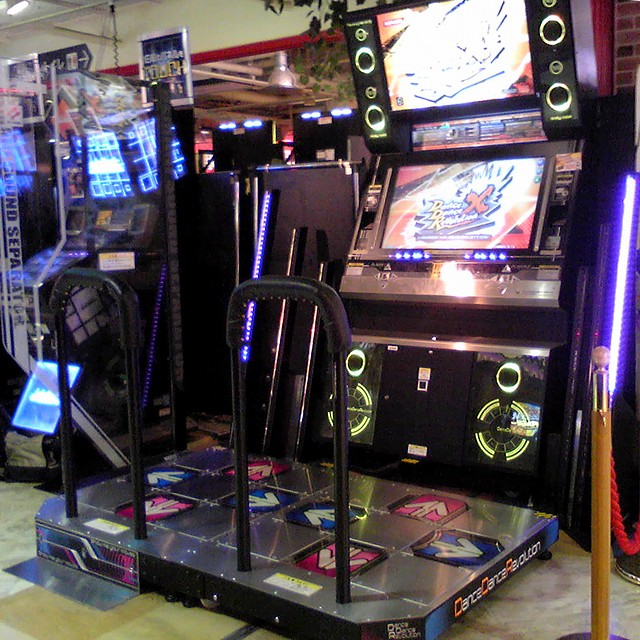
The new "dedicated" cabinet

Konami held a private party on July 10, 2008, to showcase the arcade version of Dance Dance Revolution X in Japan, revealing additional information on the upcoming game. Improvements included a widescreen LCD, better sound system, new modes of gameplay, a link system between the arcade and PlayStation 2 version of the game, the ability to publish step edits across all arcade machines via e-Amusement using a standard USB drive and a new type of arrow called a Shock Arrow, one that is to be avoided instead of stepped on. Konami promised that there would be at least 60 new songs featured in DDR X, in addition to having the "strongest" songs of the Dance Dance Revolution series returning from previous DDR games. Konami also announced the North American DDR X arcade through their DDR Online Community website.

Location tests also revealed enhancements to the interface, such as a new "screen filter" option (which adds a transparent shaded area behind the arrows to improve visibility), a full combo "splash" effect animation (white for a Marvelous combo, gold for a Perfect combo, and green for a Great combo), and colored combo numbers which indicate the status of a combo colored the same way (which however, was absent on the US PS2 version).

An issue of Arcadia Magazine confirmed other details, such as the presence of some of the "x-edits" and licenses from the US PS2 version, Koko Soko by Smile.dk and announced that there would be a collaboration song with Naoki and Smile.dk present.

A post on Konami's development blog website announced that the arcade version of Dance Dance Revolution X would be released in Japan on December 24, 2008. A December 20 posting confirmed that songs from the home version DDR Hottest Party would appear on DDR X, demonstrated by a screenshot showing new doubles steps for a song inferred to be from one of the Hottest Party games and a dance stage backdrop from the game. The December 22nd post confirmed that "will" by Naoki (from the original Hottest Party game) would appear on DDR X, also showing a dance stage from the game branded with the logo of a recently released DDR game.

The North American release was prepared at the 2009 ASI Expo in Las Vegas, Nevada, in March, which revealed that the game would be released in North America by May, and that e-Amusement service would be available for a monthly subscription on launch. Minor adjustments also revealed included a return to use of the left and right buttons rather than up and down for song selection on the new cabinet, and that changes would be made to the cabinet as well to reduce costs including the removal of some of the lighting. Additional design changes were made for the final cabinet, significantly altered from the designs that had been previously exhibited and released outside of the country.

=== Japanese PlayStation 2 ===
A PlayStation 2 version of Dance Dance Revolution X was released in Japan on January 29, 2009. It was the final Dance Dance Revolution game released in Japan for the PlayStation 2 . The game features the ability to transfer data between the arcade and PS2 versions such as edits. The Japanese PS2 version will also feature the UI enhancements seen on the arcade version. Pre-order included the game, the combined soundtrack for X and Full Full Party, a DDR X branded 2GB USB flash drive (which can be used with the link features), and other items.

== Gameplay ==
A pre-release screenshot of Dance Dance Revolution X's "Street Master Mode" – a mission mode which follows a narrative driven storyline

The gameplay of Dance Dance Revolution X continues the gameplay introduced at the beginning of the series. DDR X contains returning Konami Originals and classic licensed tracks as well as new songs by Konami and label artists. Despite the new overhauled cabinet design available, the dance stage layout remains almost completely unaltered to the original, except in North America, where aesthetic changes were made to cut costs in production.

The scoring system from Dance Dance Revolution SuperNOVA 2 is nearly retained in this game. Since the step rating for shock arrow is similar to freeze arrow, their values are the same. The value of each step, jump, freeze, or shock arrow is equal to 1,000,000 divided by (Number of steps [A jump will be considered a step in scoring] + Number of freezes [A pair of freeze that starts and ends at the same time will be considered as one freeze in scoring] + Number of shock arrows [4-way or 8-way]).

=== Shock Arrows ===
Shock Arrows are different from normal arrows. They represent white arrows with lightning effects that span across all the arrows, and must be avoided instead of stepped on. Stepping or even holding player's foot on a Shock Arrow results in players losing their combo, part of their life bar and all other arrows disappear momentarily. Avoiding them results in an OK judgment and hitting one results in an N.G., similar to how Freeze Arrows are judged. Only specific songs feature stepcharts containing Shock Arrows, which are marked with an icon on the song select screen and will take up the "Challenge" difficulty slot. Shock Arrow charts typically are a copy of the main difficulty stepcharts (Basic, Difficult, or Expert) with some of its steps replaced by Shock Arrows, though recent versions have made its use less traditional. These are similar to the mines from In the Groove.

=== Difficulty scale changes ===
The difficulty scale for Dance Dance Revolution X has been changed from previous versions. This is the first full-scale overhaul of the Dance Dance Revolution difficulty rating system moving forward.

Difficulty ratings ranging from 1 to 10 are shown with yellow blocks, and 11 to 20, overlapping the first ten, in red. Existing songs in the DDR series included in DDR X are re-rated to reflect the new range, usually by 1.4x or 1.5x from original rating to new. No songs, new or otherwise, in X had songs rated higher than 18 (even though the game lets the player rate custom edit data up to maximum), though this trend is broken in recent versions, with the officially-rated 19 song "Valkyrie Dimension" appearing in DDR X2.

=== Options ===
Many new options are introduced in X. More variations of speed options have been added, i.e., x2.5, x3.5, x4, x4.5, x5.5, x6, x6.5, x7, and x7.5. A variation of "Cut" ("On2"), have been added which shows 4th and 8th notes only (instead of 4th notes only of the existing one, now renamed "On1"). "Screen Filter" option have been added which darkens the screen of the play area for better visibility. The option can be set to "Dark", "Darker", or "Darkest". More "Special Arrow" options (arrow skin) have been added. Also, all options have been color-coded to indicate whether a player has altered it (white), or not (green) and assigned colors for various difficulties, just like being shown during song selection. Setting of options on Encore Extra Stage is now possible.

=== Combos ===
Starting in this game, getting a N.G. in freeze/shock arrows will break the combos (previous versions kept the combos intact). Numeric digits in the number of combos and the word "combo" are assigned certain color; it applies only to current fragment of combo; its color can be white (with frost surrounding the font) if it contains "Marvelous" steps only, yellow if it contains "Marvelous" and/or "Perfect" steps only, or green if it contains "Marvelous", "Perfect", and/or "Great" steps only. Declaration of "Marvelous Full Combo" (If all steps are "Marvelous" only), "Perfect Full Combo" (If all steps are "Marvelous" and/or "Perfect" only), and "Full Combo" (If all steps are "Marvelous", "Perfect", and/or "Great" only) is conditionally shown before the message "Cleared" (With matching color for laser beam effect and sunlight effect). The stage result now shows "Marvelous Full Combo" if the player scores full Marvelous steps (previous games only limits "Perfect Full Combo" to be shown in results screen).

=== Edit data ===
The "edit data" functionality which was dropped after DDR Extreme has also returned, players are able to make edits with the Japanese PS2 version of Dance Dance Revolution X and play them on the Japanese arcade version. Although the ability to use PlayStation memory cards for edit data between arcade and console versions was present between the special "link version" of 2nd Mix and Extreme, X utilizes USB flash drives for this functionality rather than PlayStation memory cards. The Japanese PS2 version of Dance Dance Revolution X can export edit data from it, and any other Japanese DDR home version onto a USB drive.

In the United States, SD cards will be used for edits instead of USB flash drives. A program will be released for PCs that will allow users to create and share edits to save to these cards.

Another new feature of edits is the ability to publish player edits on the arcade machine. Each machine can hold up to one hundred player edits, and the machine eliminates old edit data based on popularity. Konami has also announced that the "most popular" edits will be chosen on a weekly basis to be published on all X machines connected to Konami's e-Amusement online service.

=== Extra Stage and Encore Extra Stage ===
As with SuperNOVA 2, the extra stage is unlocked by getting a AA grade on either:

- a song available only on the Final stage - On the Break by Darwin (by getting A or better on any stage prior to the final stage), or
- a song picked using Random on Final stage, or
- any X-Mix (Appears as final stage song when this is highlighted. Appears on second to final stage when highlighting any song other than X-Mix).

The number of lives given on the Extra Stage is the same as that of SuperNOVA2 plus 1 (Except if the score obtained on Final Stage is at least 990,000). The song that will unlock on Extra Stage is SABER WING by TAG; by getting AA on this, the song that will unlock on Encore Extra Stage is Horatio by OR-IF-IS.

Unlike previous versions however, different extra stage songs may become available if certain conditions are met. X-Specials, special edits of boss songs from previous versions, can be unlocked for the Extra and Encore Extra Stages by meeting certain criteria based on songs from their respective version.

=== Characters ===
A total of 18 characters are available in Dance Dance Revolution X. These include all 14 characters present in the Dance Dance Revolution SuperNova series, though the Concents are now replaced with Louis Concent-III and the Zukins are now replaced with Queen-Zukin. Also revived is Lady, from the first three DDR releases. New characters include Bonnie, Zero and the first arcade appearance of PiX. As with SuperNova 2, each character offers two costumes, including 1stMix costumes for Afro and Lady.

=== e-Amusement ===
e-Amusement functionality has increased on Dance Dance Revolution X. Players can now specify rivals, and regional high scores are now displayed before a song begins. Patches for song timing and the unlocking of new songs have also been distributed to machines over the network. e-Amusement service will also be offered outside of Asia for the first time, as US machines will ship with e-Amusement card readers, and arcades will be able to register for a monthly subscription to the service. e-Amusement service for DDR X ended on September 1, 2010.

e-Amusement was never activated in North America. It was said from a Konami representative that a partnership with the Brunswick Zone arcade chain had fallen through and they have yet to find an interested partner for the service.

== Location tests ==
Live testing of the Japanese Dance Dance Revolution X arcade machine started on July 17, 2008, in Kanagawa Prefecture, Japan, and ended July 23, 2008. The first test location featured a somewhat-complete machine. The machine did not feature many of the music videos that will be in the final version, USB support, or e-Amusement support. Several new Konami tracks were spotted by players, though only one song was seen with the Shock Arrow feature and no licensed tracks had yet been revealed. The second location test in Japan started on July 25, 2008, in Osaka, Japan, and ended on July 31, 2008. The second test location featured a new version of the game software with more accurate difficulty ratings, fixes for bugs seen during the first location test, and licensed music.

On August 26, Konami announced that a location test for X would be held at Boomers! Parks in Irvine, California. This was the first announced location test of Dance Dance Revolution X for North America. The test began on September 8, 2008, and ran until September 14, 2008. A location test for UBeat was also held alongside the X test.

Konami also announced that there would be location testing of Dance Dance Revolution X in the coming months in Europe prior to the arcade machine's global release. Dance Dance Revolution X and UBeat appeared at the 2009 ATEI Expo in London in January 2009, featuring the same build as seen at the Irvine tests. The cabinet used was moved to Trocadero Funland after the expo.

== Reception ==
Reception

Aggregate score
Aggregator	Score
Metacritic	55/100

Review scores
Publication	Score
GameRevolution	1.5/5
IGN	5.4/10

The reviews for the PlayStation 2 version of Dance Dance Revolution X were mixed. IGN gave it a 5.4/10, noting that Street Master Mode was neither "good or bad", noting the dropping of online multiplayer and the previous mission mode and shop system from the previous version. The new announcer was also criticized, stating that it has the "most annoying lines, voices, and attitude ever". The visuals were also criticized as being blocky, with the UI being described as "ugly and unpolished". 1UP's Torrey Walker gave the game a C−, describing Street Master Mode as "painfully dull and repetitive". The soundtrack was described as "a clutter of uninspiring off-brand dance tracks, with captivating licensed songs few and far between" (citing a poor stepchart for U Can't Touch This), and the announcer was dubbed "unintentionally hysterical". However, the wide variety of game modes (including workout mode) was mentioned as a plus, and suggested the game as an alternative to Nintendo's Wii Fit.

=== Cabinet changes outside of Asia ===
As was stated by Konami at ASI, significant changes were made to the DDR X and X2 cabinets released outside of Asia, including North America and Europe. In comparison to models that had been exhibited before release, the new cabinets featured different lighting and sound systems, the inclusion of USB ports rather than SD cards as had been previously announced, and a monitor experiencing large amounts of lag. Significant changes to the construction of the pads themselves were also made, including the pad being covered by one piece of metal rather than the traditional design of separate panels (with its connection to the main cabinet covered by a metallic platform), and lower quality sensors in the pads themselves, all implying that the manufacturers cut corners in the construction of the cabinets.
