= Dance Dance Revolution Hottest Party 3 =

2009 video game

- Developer(s): Konami
- Publisher(s): Konami
- Series: Dance Dance Revolution
- Engine: Custom
- Platform(s): Wii
- Release: NA: October 27, 2009; JP: January 28, 2010; EU: June 4, 2010
- Genre(s): Music, exercise
- Mode(s): Single-player, multiplayer

Dance Dance Revolution Hottest Party 3, released in Japan as Dance Dance Revolution: Music Fit (ダンスダンスレボリューション：ミュージックフィット, Dansu Dansu Reboryūshon: Myūjikku Fitto), is a rhythm-based dancing game for the Wii. It is a video game released by Konami in 2009. The game can be played using a dance pad, the classic controller, or the Wii Remote and Nunchuck combination. It has two games preceding it: Dance Dance Revolution Hottest Party and Dance Dance Revolution Hottest Party 2.

== Gameplay ==
Gameplay remains relatively unchanged from the original game. New modes on Dance Dance Revolution Hottest Party 3 include Tournament Mode, Relaxed Mode, DDR School, Hypermove Mode, and Wii Balance Board Modes. Returning modes include Free Play Mode and Training Mode. Dropped modes include the "Groove Circuit/Arena" Mode. It has been replaced with Tournament Mode. The use of hand markers have been removed from Free Play Mode. They are still existent in DDR School and Hypermove Mode, but are called Punch Markers.

=== Arrows ===
In game, arrow timing is scored based on a system with Marvelous, Perfect, Great, Good, Almost (merged with Good), and Miss. If four arrows are stepped on consecutively with a "Great" score or higher, a combo is started. If a full combo is reached, a "Full Combo Finished" message should appear at the end of a song.

=== Gimmicks ===
Unlike the two games preceding this one, gimmicks must be unlocked to be used in game. New gimmicks include the Sudden Arrow, the Minimizer and Normalizer, and Diagonal Arrows.

== Music ==
The songs in red are "boss songs." The songs with padlocks next to them are locked until certain conditions are met in the game, and songs with a clapperboard next to them have music videos featured.

Dance Dance Revolution Hottest Party 3 soundtrack
Song	Artist
Bonafied Lovin'	Chromeo
Boogie Wonderland	Earth, Wind & Fire
Closer	Ne-Yo
Daft Punk Is Playing at My House	LCD Soundsystem
Detroit Rock City	Kiss
Disturbia	Rihanna
Do You Know (The Ping Pong Song)	Enrique Iglesias
Dream On Dreamer	The Brand New Heavies
Enjoy the Silence	Depeche Mode
Feel Good Inc.	Gorillaz
Good Times	Chic
Hungry Like the Wolf	Duran Duran
I Know You Want Me (Calle Ocho)	Pitbull
I'm Coming Out	Diana Ross
Ice Ice Baby	Vanilla Ice
Just Dance	Lady Gaga
La Camisa Negra	Juanes
Let's Get It Started	The Black Eyed Peas
My Prerogative	Bobby Brown
Never Gonna Give You Up	Rick Astley
One Step at a Time	Jordin Sparks
Pocketful Of Sunshine	Natasha Bedingfield
Pork and Beans	Weezer
Praise You	Fatboy Slim
So What	Pink
South Side	Moby
The Space Dance	Danny Tenaglia
Viva La Vida	Coldplay
When I Grow Up	Pussycat Dolls
You Got It (The Right Stuff)	New Kids On The Block
Lesson by DJ	U.T.D & Friends
Lesson2 by DJ	MC DDR
Lesson3 by DJ	Dr. DDR
A Brighter Day	Naoki feat. Aleisha G
Be With You (Still Miss you)	nc ft.Eddie Kay
Brilliant 2U	NAOKI
CELEBRATE NIGHT	NAOKI
Crazy Control	D-crew with VAL TIATIA
DYNAMITE RAVE	NAOKI
Freeze	nc ft. NRG Factory
Gotta Dance	NAOKI feat. Aleisha G
Heatstroke	TAG feat. Angie Lee
Keep on movin'	NM
La libertad	Cherryl Horrocks
La receta	Carlos Coco Garcia
Love Again	NM feat. Mr. E.
Now's The Time	Brenda
PARADISE	Lea Drop feat. McCall Clark
Sacred Oath	Terra
Shine	TOMOSUKE feat. Adreana
Taking It To The Sky	U1 feat. Tammy S. Hansen
THIS NIGHT	jun feat. Sonnet
TRUE♥LOVE (Clubstar's True Club Mix)	jun feat. Schanita
What Will Come Of Me	Black Rose Garden
You Are A Star	NAOKI feat. Anna Kaelin
HOTTEST PARTY	
HOTTEST PARTY 2	
KIMONO♥PRINCESS	jun
Pluto The First	WHITE WALL
roppongi EVOLVED	TAG underground

Dance Dance Revolution Music Fit soundtrack
Song	Artist
Sunao ni Naretara	Juju
You Can Fly! (Peter Pan)	
Make Your Dreams Come True Doraemon	Mao
A Perfect Sky	Rei Yasuda
Walking	Greeeen
It's a Small World	
Kimi wo mamotte Kimi wo aishite	Sambomaster
Odoru Ponpokorin	B.B Queens
Shangri-La	Kumiko Ishikawa
Shuuchishin	Teiyosan
Mickey Mouse Club March	
Genesis of Aquarion	Akino
Summer rain	♪♪♪♪♪
Journey Through the Decade	Gackt
Stairway Generation	Base Ball Bear
Blue Bird	Ikimonogatari
Samurai Sentai Shinkenger	Psychic Lover
Cat's Eye	E-Rotic
Hot Limit	T.M. Revolution
Meikyu Butterfly	Nana Mizuki
Sorairo Days	Shoko Nakagawa
Butterfly	Smile.dk
Climax Jump pop'n form	Shoko Fujibayashi
Carmen Prelude	
Shizuku	Sumikaswitch
My Boy	
William Tell Overture	
Lesson by DJ	U.T.D & Friends
Lesson2 by DJ	MC DDR
Lesson3 by DJ	Dr. DDR
A Brighter Day	Naoki feat. Aleisha G
Be With You (Still Miss you)	nc ft.Eddie Kay
Crazy Control	D-crew with VAL TIATIA
DYNAMITE RAVE	NAOKI
Freeze	nc ft. NRG Factory
Gotta Dance	NAOKI feat. Aleisha G
Heatstroke	TAG feat. Angie Lee
La libertad	Cherryl Horrocks
La receta	Carlos Coco Garcia
Love Again	NM feat. Mr. E.
Now's The Time	Brenda
PARADISE	Lea Drop feat. McCall Clark
Sacred Oath	Terra
Shine	TOMOSUKE feat. Adreana
Taking It To The Sky	U1 feat. Tammy S. Hansen
THIS NIGHT	jun feat. Sonnet
What Will Come Of Me	Black Rose Garden
You Are A Star	NAOKI feat. Anna Kaelin
HOTTEST PARTY	
HOTTEST PARTY 2	
KIMONO♥PRINCESS	jun
roppongi EVOLVED	TAG underground

== See also ==
- Dance Dance Revolution Hottest Party
- Dance Dance Revolution Hottest Party 2

Preceded by Dance Dance Revolution Hottest Party 2	Dance Dance Revolution Hottest Party 3; 2009	Succeeded by Dance Dance Revolution
