= Dance Dance Revolution (2010 video game) =

- North American cover art for the PlayStation 3
- Developers: Hudson Soft, Studio ZAN
- Publisher: Konami
- Series: Dance Dance Revolution
- Engine: Custom (PS3 & Xbox 360); Hottest Party series (Wii)
- Platforms: Wii, PlayStation 3, Xbox 360
- Release: Wii: NA: November 16, 2010; EU: May 6, 2011; PlayStation 3: NA: November 16, 2010; EU: March 18, 2011; Xbox 360: NA: April 12, 2011
- Genres: Music, Exercise
- Modes: Single player, Multiplayer

Dance Dance Revolution, released in Europe as Dance Dance Revolution Hottest Party 4 for the Wii version and Dance Dance Revolution New Moves for other versions, is a music video game in the Dance Dance Revolution series, with this entry developed by Konami's American division. Unveiled at E3 2010, it was released for the Wii and PlayStation 3 in North America on November 16, 2010. A port of this version for the Xbox 360 was also released on April 12, 2011. It is also the only game in the series to be released for the PlayStation 3, as well as the final game in the series to be released for the Xbox 360.

== Gameplay ==
Dance Dance Revolution's choreography mode utilizes new hand motions to form dance routines.

=== Wii ===
While the Classic gameplay mode remains similar to previous editions, it is also accompanied by a new Choreography mode, which incorporates motions performed using the Wii Remote and Nunchuck alongside foot motions with the dance pad to form choreographed dance routines for each song. Goal-based challenges are also provided, which can allow players to earn points which unlock additional outfits and songs. As with the previous version, a mode is also provided that utilizes the Wii Balance Board.

=== PS3 ===
Gameplay remains similar to previous DDR games but with additional new features, such as "Chain Arrow"—a score bonus for maintaining a combo through a certain section of arrows, and "Groove Trigger", which allows the player to reduce their lifebar by 50% to increase the number of points earned for a period. The PlayStation 3 version also adds support for the PlayStation Move controller, similar to what the Hottest Party series had done with the Wii Remote; in this mode, four targets are placed around the player, which are hit with the motion controller when special diagonal arrows appear. Some songs on the Challenge difficulty also contain routines that also use the corner buttons of the dance pad along with the directional arrows.

== Music ==
The soundtrack of Dance Dance Revolution featured more mainstream pop music spanning multiple genres, along with the original music characteristic to other entries in the series.

The following music is the song list for the PlayStation 3 version of "Dance Dance Revolution".

Music tracks highlighted in yellow represent licensed master tracks, white represents Konami original songs, and red represents Boss songs (siren will be heard while highlighting the song in game). A padlock indicates that the song has to be unlocked first.

Song	Artist	Note
"According To You"	Orianthi	
"Animal"	Kesha	
"Bad Romance"	Lady Gaga	
"Battlefield"	Jordin Sparks	
"Celebration"	Kool & the Gang	
"Crushcrushcrush"	Paramore	
"Dancing in the Street"	Martha and the Vandellas	
"Hey, Soul Sister"	Train	
"I Got You"	Leona Lewis	
"I'm Yours"	Jason Mraz	
"Love Like This"	Natasha Bedingfield	
"Love Shack"	The B-52's	
"Missing"	"Everything But The Girl"	
"My Life Would Suck Without You"	Kelly Clarkson	
"Need You Now"	Lady Antebellum	
"Plastic Beach"	Gorillaz (feat. Mick Jones & Paul Simonon)	
"Rio"	Duran Duran	
"So Fine"	Sean Paul	
"Venus"	Bananarama	
"We Are Family"	Sister Sledge	
"A Geisha's Dream (Ruffage Remix)"	Naoki feat. SMILE.dk	from Dance Dance Revolution S
"AFRONOVA"	RE-VENGE	from Dance Dance Revolution 3rdMix
"Curry Up"	OR-IF-IS	
"DOUBLE TORNARD"	evo-X	
"Dreaming Can Make a Wish Come True"	Jun & NRG Factory ft. Anna Kaelin	
"Ever Snow"	TЁЯRA	
"Find You Again"	The W feat. Rita Boudreau	
"Flowers"	TЁЯRA	from Dance Dance Revolution SuperNova
"In the Zone"	U1 (NPD3 Style) & Kidd Kazmeo	
"Let's Get Away"	Naoki ft. Brenda Burch	
"MAGIC PARADE"	Lea Drop feat. Katie Dellenbach	
"On the Night of a Still Wind"	Jena Rose	
"One Sided Love"	D-crew with Melissa Petty	
"Private Eye"	Atomsoak ft. Cerol	
"Rescue Me"	NAOKI ft. Fracus	
"Rhythms Inside"	DKC Crew	
"Seasons"	TOMOSUKE feat. Crystal Paloa	
"Share The Love"	Brenda Burch	
"Sweet Sweet (Love) Magic"	jun	from DDRMAX2 Dance Dance Revolution 7thMix
"The Island Song"	TAG ft. Eric Anthony	
"The Way U Move"	Bill Hamel & Derek James feat. Breana Skiles	
"TIME"	NM feat. Aleisha G	
"Top the Charts"	J-Mi & Midi-D ft. Hanna Stockzell	
"TSUGARU (APPLE MIX)"	RevenG vs. DE-SIRE	from DDRMAX2 Dance Dance Revolution 7thMix
"Until the End"	Philip Webb	
"Wicked Plastik"	nc ft. Electric Touch	
"Win the Game"	DKC Crew	
"MAX 300"	Ω	from DDRMAX Dance Dance Revolution 6thMix
"CRAZY♥LOVE"	jun	
"New York EVOLVED"	NC underground	

=== Downloadable content ===
Downloadable content is only available on the PlayStation 3 version. Each pack consists of 5 songs and costs $4.49, but the Premium pack is free.
DanceDanceRevolution Greatest Hits

Song	Artist	Note
"AM-3P"	KTz	from Dance Dance Revolution 2ndMix
"BRILLIANT 2U"	NAOKI	from Dance Dance Revolution 2ndMix
"PARANOiA"	180	from Dance Dance Revolution
"PUT YOUR FAITH IN ME"	UZI-LAY	from Dance Dance Revolution 2ndMix
"TRIP MACHINE"	DE-SIRE	from Dance Dance Revolution

DDR KONAMIX Greatest Hits

Song	Artist	Note
"B4U"	NAOKI	from Dance Dance Revolution 4thMix
"BURNIN' THE FLOOR"	NAOKI	from Dance Dance Revolution 4thMix
"HIGHER"	NM feat. SUNNY	from Dance Dance Revolution 4thMix
"HYSTERIA"	NAOKI 190	Dance Dance Revolution Solo Bass Mix
"TRIP MACHINE (luv mix)"	2MB	from Dance Dance Revolution 2ndReMix

DDRMAX2 Greatest Hits

Song	Artist	Note
"D2R"	NAOKI	
"KAKUMEI"	dj TAKA with NAOKI	
"rain of sorrow"	NM feat. EBONY FAY	
"STILL IN MY HEART"	NAOKI	from Dance Revolution 5thMix
"SUPER STAR"	D.J.RICH feat. TAILBROS.	from Dance Revolution Solo Bass Mix

DDR SuperNOVA Greatest Hits 1

Song	Artist	Note
"Gamelan de Couple"	TOMOSUKE	from MAMBO A GO GO
"Mugen"	TЁЯRA	from Pop'n Music 12 Iroha
"My Only Shining Star"	NAOKI feat. Becky Lucinda	
"RED ZONE"	Tatsh & NAOKI	from Beatmania IIDX 11 IIDX
"TRUE♥LOVE"	jun	

DDR SuperNOVA Greatest Hits 2

Song	Artist	Note
"CAN'T STOP FALLIN' IN LOVE (super euro version)"	NAOKI with Y&Co.	from Para Para Paradise
"Fascination MAXX"	100-200-400	
"Flow (True Style)"	Scotty D. revisits U1	
"INNOCENCE OF SILENCE"	nc ft. NRG Factory	
"Star Gate Heaven"	SySF. feat. Donna Burke	

DDR SuperNOVA 2 Greatest Hits

Song	Artist	Note
"Arrabbiata"	Reven-G Alternative	from pop'n music 10
"BALLAD FOR YOU"	NM feat. THOMAS HOWARD	from Beatmania IIDX 6th style
"KISS KISS KISS"	NAOKI feat. SHANTI	from Dance Dance Revolution Extreme (Japan)
"Music In The Rhythm"	nc ft. Electric Touch	from Dance Dance Revolution SuperNova 2
"Raspberry♥Heart (English version)"	jun feat. PAULA TERRY	from Beatmania IIDX 11 IIDXRED

PREMIUM PACK

Song	Artist
"dreaming can make a wish come true (Full Version)"	jun & NRG Factory feat. Anna Kaelin
"Let's Get Away (Full Version)"	NAOKI feat. Brenda Burch
"Private Eye (Full Version)"	atomsoak ft. cerol

== Reception ==
Reception

Aggregate score
Aggregator	Score
Metacritic	PS3: 60/100

Review scores
Publication	Score
GamesRadar+	PS3: 2.5/5
IGN	WII: 7.0/10

The Wii version of the game received mixed-to-positive reviews while the PlayStation 3 version received mixed reviews from critics.

IGN gave the Wii game a 7.0 out of 10, noting that while the series was beginning to feel antiquated due to the increasing of realistic dance games such as Dance Central, the core gameplay of Dance Dance Revolution still "worked" in their opinion. Its selection of multiplayer modes were praised as good changes of pace from the classic mode, and the Choreography mode was noted as being fun and not too difficult, but panned for inaccurate motion detection and for not being as evolutionary as its competitors. Its soundtrack was considered favorable, due to its mixture of more mainstream music from the past and present along with the typical Japanese-produced music common to the series, but noted that Lady Antebellum's "Need You Now" did not fit with the overall upbeat theme of the game.

GamesRadar+'s Carolyn Gudmundson gave the PS3 game a 2.5 out of 5, feeling that the PlayStation Move support seemed to be a tacked-on gimmick, and required awkward hand crossing to hit certain targets, comparing it to a game of Twister rather than DDR. The soundtrack was panned for containing too many pop songs, some of which unsuited for a dance game; such as "I'm Yours", jokingly believing that not even a Jason Mraz fan would think the song would fit on a dance game.

Preceded by Dance Dance Revolution Hottest Party 3	Dance Dance Revolution; 2010	Succeeded by Dance Dance Revolution II
