= List of Dance Dance Revolution video games =

The Dance Dance Revolution series started in 1998 and has grown to a large set of games in the franchise. This list of Dance Dance Revolution games documents games released, including systems, formats, and regions for which the games were released.

== Legend ==
| Flag | Country |
|---|---|
| (Japan) | Japanese release |
| (China) | Chinese release |
| (Korea) | Korean release |
Region
| (European Union) | European release |
| Asia | Asian release |
| North America | North American release |
| South America | South American release |
| Oceania | Oceanic release |

These lists are sorted by platform of release, then region, then best-known release date, then regional or renamed version title, if any. Releases that have sold more than one million copies or have been re-issued as Greatest Hits are colored orange.

== Dance Dance Revolution ==
| Title | Platform | Country-region | Release |
|---|---|---|---|
| Dance Dance Revolution; Dancing Stage (Europe) | Arcade | Japan | 1998-11-18 |
| Dance Dance Revolution; Dancing Stage (Europe) | PlayStation | Japan | 1999-04-10 |
| Dance Dance Revolution; Dancing Stage (Europe) | Arcade | South Korea Asia | March 1999 |
| Dance Dance Revolution; Dancing Stage (Europe) | Arcade | North America | 1999 |
| Dance Dance Revolution; Dancing Stage (Europe) | Arcade | (European Union) | March 1999 |
| Dance Dance Revolution; Dancing Stage (Europe) | Arcade | (European Union) | 1999-03-05 |
| Dance Dance Revolution 2ndMix; Dance Dance Revolution 2ndRemix; Dance Dance Revolution 2ndMix Dreamcast Edition | Arcade | Japan | 1999-01-19 |
| Dance Dance Revolution 2ndMix; Dance Dance Revolution 2ndRemix; Dance Dance Revolution 2ndMix Dreamcast Edition | PlayStation | Japan | 1999-08-26 |
| Dance Dance Revolution 2ndMix; Dance Dance Revolution 2ndRemix; Dance Dance Revolution 2ndMix Dreamcast Edition | Dreamcast | Japan | 2000-02-17 |
| Dance Dance Revolution Best of Cool Dancers | Arcade | Japan | 1999-02-11 |
| Dance Dance Revolution 2ndMix with Beatmania IIDX Club Version | Arcade | Japan | 1999-04-21 |
| Dance Dance Revolution 2ndMix Link Version | Arcade | Japan | 1999-04-28 |
| Dance Dance Revolution 2ndMix and Beatmania IIDX Substream Club Version 2 | Arcade | Japan | 1999-07-27 |
| Dancing Stage featuring True Kiss Destination | Arcade | Japan | 1999-07-27 |
| Dancing Stage featuring True Kiss Destination | Arcade | Asia | 1999-07-27 |
| Dancing Stage featuring True Kiss Destination | PlayStation | Japan | 1999-12-09 |
| Dance Dance Revolution 3rdMix; Dance Dance Revolution USA | PlayStation | Japan | 2000-06-01 |
| Dance Dance Revolution 3rdMix; Dance Dance Revolution USA | Arcade | Japan | 1999-10-30 |
| Dance Dance Revolution 3rdMix; Dance Dance Revolution USA | Arcade | Asia | 1999-10-30 |
| Dance Dance Revolution 3rdMix; Dance Dance Revolution USA | Arcade | North America | October 2000 |
| Dance Dance Revolution 3rdMix; Dance Dance Revolution USA | Arcade | South Korea | 2000 |
| Dance Dance Revolution Karaoke Mix | Arcade | Japan | November 1999 |
| Dancing Stage featuring Dreams Come True | Arcade | Japan | 1999-12-25 |
| Dance Dance Revolution 3rdMix Plus | Arcade | Japan | 2000-06-21 |
| Dance Dance Revolution Karaoke Mix 2nd | Arcade | Japan | July 2000 |
| Dance Dance Revolution 4thMix | Arcade | Japan | 2000-08-24 |
| Dance Dance Revolution 4thMix | PlayStation | Japan | 2001-03-15 |
| Dance Dance Revolution 4thMix | Arcade | South Korea Asia | 2000-08-24 |
| Dancing Stage featuring Disney's Rave; Dance Dance Revolution Disney's Rave; Dance Dance Revolution Disney Mix; Dancing Stage Disney Mix | Arcade | Japan | 2000-11-30 |
| Dancing Stage featuring Disney's Rave; Dance Dance Revolution Disney's Rave; Dance Dance Revolution Disney Mix; Dancing Stage Disney Mix | PlayStation | Japan | 2000-11-30 |
| Dancing Stage featuring Disney's Rave; Dance Dance Revolution Disney's Rave; Dance Dance Revolution Disney Mix; Dancing Stage Disney Mix | PlayStation | North America | 2001-09-18 |
| Dancing Stage featuring Disney's Rave; Dance Dance Revolution Disney's Rave; Dance Dance Revolution Disney Mix; Dancing Stage Disney Mix | PlayStation | (European Union) | 2001-09-28 |
| Dancing Stage featuring Disney's Rave; Dance Dance Revolution Disney's Rave; Dance Dance Revolution Disney Mix; Dancing Stage Disney Mix | PlayStation | Oceania | 2001-09-28 |
| Dance Dance Revolution Kids | Arcade | Japan | December 2000 |
| Dance Dance Revolution 4thMix Plus | Arcade | Japan | 2000-12-28 |
| Dance Dance Revolution 4thMix Plus | Arcade | Asia | 2000-12-28 |
| Dance Dance Revolution 5thMix | Arcade | Japan | 2001-03-27 |
| Dance Dance Revolution 5thMix | PlayStation | Japan | 2001-09-20 |
| DDRMAX Dance Dance Revolution 6thMix | Arcade | Japan | 2001-10-19 |
| DDRMAX Dance Dance Revolution 6thMix | PlayStation 2 | Japan | 2002-05-16 |
| DDRMAX2 Dance Dance Revolution 7thMix | Arcade | Japan | 2002-03-27 |
| DDRMAX2 Dance Dance Revolution 7thMix | PlayStation 2 | Japan | 2003-04-24 |
| Dance Dance Revolution Extreme | Arcade | Japan | 2002-12-25 |
| Dance Dance Revolution Extreme | PlayStation 2 | Japan | 2003-10-09 |
| Dance Dance Revolution SuperNova; Dancing Stage SuperNova | Arcade | Japan | 2006-07-12 |
| Dance Dance Revolution SuperNova; Dancing Stage SuperNova | Arcade | North America | 2006-05-15 |
| Dance Dance Revolution SuperNova; Dancing Stage SuperNova | Arcade | North America | 2006-06-15 (re-release) |
| Dance Dance Revolution SuperNova; Dancing Stage SuperNova | Arcade | (European Union) | 2006-04-28 |
| Dance Dance Revolution SuperNova; Dancing Stage SuperNova | Arcade | (European Union) | 2006-07-15 |
| Dance Dance Revolution SuperNova; Dancing Stage SuperNova | Arcade | Asia | 2006-07-12 |
| Dance Dance Revolution SuperNova; Dancing Stage SuperNova | PlayStation 2 | Japan | 2007-01-25 |
| Dance Dance Revolution SuperNova; Dancing Stage SuperNova | PlayStation 2 | North America | 2006-09-26 |
| Dance Dance Revolution SuperNova; Dancing Stage SuperNova | PlayStation 2 | (European Union) | 2007-04-27 |
| Dance Dance Revolution SuperNova 2 Dancing Stage SuperNova 2 | Arcade | Japan | 2007-08-22 |
| Dance Dance Revolution SuperNova 2 Dancing Stage SuperNova 2 | Arcade | North America | 2008-01-17 |
| Dance Dance Revolution SuperNova 2 Dancing Stage SuperNova 2 | Arcade | South America | 2008-01-17 |
| Dance Dance Revolution SuperNova 2 Dancing Stage SuperNova 2 | Arcade | Asia | 2007-08-22 |
| Dance Dance Revolution SuperNova 2 Dancing Stage SuperNova 2 | PlayStation 2 | Japan | 2008-02-21 |
| Dance Dance Revolution SuperNova 2 Dancing Stage SuperNova 2 | PlayStation 2 | (European Union) | 2008-10-03 |
| Dance Dance Revolution SuperNova 2 Dancing Stage SuperNova 2 | PlayStation 2 | North America | 2007-09-26 |
| Dance Dance Revolution X | Arcade | Japan | 2008-12-24 |
| Dance Dance Revolution X | Arcade | North America | 2009-06-09 |
| Dance Dance Revolution X | Arcade | (European Union) | 2009-06-03 |
| Dance Dance Revolution X | PlayStation 2 | Japan | 2009-01-29 |
| Dance Dance Revolution X | PlayStation 2 | North America | 2008-09-16 |
| Dance Dance Revolution X2 | Arcade | Japan | 2010-07-07 |
| Dance Dance Revolution X2 | Arcade | North America | 2010-12-31 |
| Dance Dance Revolution X2 | Arcade | (European Union) | 2011-05-13 |
| Dance Dance Revolution X3 VS 2ndMix | Arcade | Japan | 2011-11-16 |
| Dance Dance Revolution (2013 edition) | Arcade | Japan | 2013-03-14 |
| Dance Dance Revolution (2013 edition) | Arcade | South Korea | 2014-02-07 |
| Dance Dance Revolution (2014 edition) | Arcade | Japan | 2014-05-12 |
| Dance Dance Revolution (2014 edition) | Arcade | South Korea | 2014-07-22 |
| Dance Dance Revolution A | Arcade | Japan | 2016–03–3 |
| Dance Dance Revolution A | Arcade | South Korea | 2016-04-04 |
| Dance Dance Revolution A | Arcade | North America | 2016-07-06 |
| Dance Dance Revolution A | Arcade | (European Union) | 2017-12-15 |
| Dance Dance Revolution A20 | Arcade | Japan | 2019-03-20 |
| Dance Dance Revolution A20 | Arcade | South Korea | 2019-08-01 |
| Dance Dance Revolution A20 | Arcade | North America | 2019-09-24 |
| Dance Dance Revolution A20 | Arcade | (European Union) | TBA |
| Dance Dance Revolution A20 Plus | Arcade | Japan | 2020-07-01 |
| Dance Dance Revolution A20 Plus | Arcade | South Korea North America | 2020-07-06 |
| Dance Dance Revolution A3 | Arcade | Japan | 2022-03-17 |
| Dance Dance Revolution A3 | Arcade | South Korea Asia | 2022-06-22 |
| Dance Dance Revolution World | Arcade | | 2024-06-12 |
| Dance Dance Revolution 2ndReMix Append Club Version Vol.1 | PlayStation | Japan | 1999-11-25 |
| Dance Dance Revolution 2ndReMix Append Club Version Vol.1 | PlayStation | Japan | 1999-11-25 |
| Dance Dance Revolution 2ndReMix Append Club Version Vol.2 | PlayStation | Japan | 1999-12-22 |
| Dancing Stage featuring Dreams Come True | PlayStation | Japan | 2000-04-20 |
| Oha Suta Dance Dance Revolution | PlayStation | Japan | 2000-09-14 |
| Dance Dance Revolution Best Hits | PlayStation | Japan | 2000-12-21 |
| Dance Dance Revolution Extra Mix | PlayStation | Japan | 2001-06-07 |
| Dance Dance Revolution Party Collection | PlayStation 2 | Japan | 2003-12-11 |
| DDR Festival Dance Dance Revolution | PlayStation 2 | Japan | 2004-11-18 |
| Dance Dance Revolution Strike | PlayStation 2 | Japan | 2006-02-16 |
| Dance Dance Revolution Club Version Dreamcast Edition | Dreamcast | Japan | 2000-04-27 |
| Dance Dance Revolution GB | Game Boy Color | Japan | 2000-08-03 |
| Dance Dance Revolution GB2 | Game Boy Color | Japan | 2000-11-16 |
| Oha Suta Dance Dance Revolution GB | Game Boy Color | Japan | 2001-02-08 |
| Dance Dance Revolution GB3 | Game Boy Color | Japan | 2001-03-15 |
| Dance Dance Revolution GB Disney Mix | Game Boy Color | Japan | 2001-03-29 |
| Dance Dance Revolution Disney Dancing Museum | Nintendo 64 | Japan | 2000-11-30 |
| Dance Dance Revolution with Mario; Dance Dance Revolution Mario Mix; Dancing Stage Mario Mix | GameCube | Japan | 2005-07-14 |
| Dance Dance Revolution with Mario; Dance Dance Revolution Mario Mix; Dancing Stage Mario Mix | GameCube | North America | 2005-10-24 |
| Dance Dance Revolution with Mario; Dance Dance Revolution Mario Mix; Dancing Stage Mario Mix | GameCube | (European Union) | 2005-10-28 |
| Dance Dance Revolution with Mario; Dance Dance Revolution Mario Mix; Dancing Stage Mario Mix | GameCube | Oceania | 2005-12-15 |
| Dance Dance Revolution Hottest Party; Dancing Stage Hottest Party | Wii | Japan | 2007-10-25 |
| Dance Dance Revolution Hottest Party; Dancing Stage Hottest Party | Wii | North America | 2007-09-26 |
| Dance Dance Revolution Hottest Party; Dancing Stage Hottest Party | Wii | (European Union) | 2008-03-28 |
| Dance Dance Revolution Full Full Party | Wii | Japan | 2008-12-18 |
| Dance Dance Revolution Music Fit | Wii | Japan | 2010-01-28 |
| Dancing Karaoke DKara | Windows | Japan | 2001-01-16 |
| Dance Dance Revolution Finger Step | Bemani Pocket | Japan | 1999-09-09 |
| Dance Dance Revolution Hello Kitty | Bemani Pocket | Japan | 1999-12-23 |
| Dance Dance Revolution Dear Daniel | Bemani Pocket | Japan | 2000-02-02 |
| Dance Dance Revolution Winnie the Pooh | Bemani Pocket | Japan | 2000-10-26 |
| Dance Dance Revolution | Mobile game | Japan | 2001-02-19 |
| Dance Dance Revolution (re-release) | Mobile game | Japan | 2004-01-21 |
| Dance Dance Revolution S | iOS | Japan | 2009-02-05 |
| Dance Dance Revolution S+ | iOS | Japan | 2009-10-05 |
| Dance Dance Revolution Family Mat | TV game | Japan | 2001-08-09 |
| My First Dance Dance Revolution | TV game | Japan | 2001-11-09 |
| Dance Dance Revolution Universe 3 Chinese Music Special Edition | Xbox 360 | China | 2009-05-12 |
| Dance Dance Revolution Ultramix | Xbox | North America | 2003-11-19 |
| Dance Dance Revolution S | iOS | North America | 2009-03-05 |
| Dance Dance Revolution | PlayStation | North America | 2001-03-20 |
| Dance Dance Revolution Konamix | PlayStation | North America | 2002-04-24 |
| DDRMAX Dance Dance Revolution | PlayStation 2 | North America | 2002-10-29 |
| DDRMAX2 Dance Dance Revolution | PlayStation 2 | North America | 2003-09-23 |
| Dance Dance Revolution Extreme | PlayStation 2 | North America | 2004-09-21 |
| Dance Dance Revolution Extreme 2 | PlayStation 2 | North America | 2005-09-28 |
| Dance Dance Revolution Disney Channel Edition | PlayStation 2 | North America | 2008-01-08 |
| Dance Dance Revolution X2 | PlayStation 2 | North America | 2009-10-27 |
| DanceDanceRevolution; DanceDanceRevolution New Moves | PlayStation 3 | North America | 2010-11-16 |
| DanceDanceRevolution; DanceDanceRevolution New Moves | PlayStation 3 | (European Union) | 2011-03-18 |
| Dance Dance Revolution Ultramix (re-release) | Xbox | North America | 2004 |
| Dance Dance Revolution Ultramix 2 | Xbox | North America | 2004-11-18 |
| Dance Dance Revolution Ultramix 3 | Xbox | North America | 2005-11-15 |
| Dance Dance Revolution Ultramix 4 | Xbox | North America | 2006-11-14 |
| Dance Dance Revolution Universe | Xbox 360 | North America | 2007-02-27 |
| Dance Dance Revolution Universe 2 | Xbox 360 | North America | 2007-12-05 |
| Dance Dance Revolution Universe 3 | Xbox 360 | North America | 2008-10-21 |
| DanceDanceRevolution | Xbox 360 | North America | 2011-04-12 |
| Dance Dance Revolution Hottest Party 2 | Wii | North America | 2008-09-16 |
| Dance Dance Revolution Hottest Party 2 | Wii | (European Union) | 2009-06-26 |
| Dance Dance Revolution Disney Grooves | Wii | North America | 2009-04-02 |
| Dance Dance Revolution Hottest Party 3 | Wii | North America | 2009-10-27 |
| Dance Dance Revolution Hottest Party 3 | Wii | (European Union) | 2010-06-04 |
| DanceDanceRevolution; DanceDanceRevolution Hottest Party 4 | Wii | North America | 2010-11-02 |
| DanceDanceRevolution; DanceDanceRevolution Hottest Party 4 | Wii | (European Union) | 2011-05-06 |
| Dance Dance Revolution II; DanceDanceRevolution Hottest Party 5 | Wii | North America | 2011-10-11 |
| Dance Dance Revolution II; DanceDanceRevolution Hottest Party 5 | Wii | (European Union) | 2011-11-25 |
| Dance Dance Revolution | Windows | North America | 2002-05-24 |
| Dance Dance Revolution Strawberry Shortcake | TV game | North America | 2006-11-14 |
| Dance Dance Revolution Disney Mix | TV game | North America | 2006-12-05 |
| My First Dance Dance Revolution | TV game | North America | 2006-12-07 |
| Dance Dance Revolution DVD Game | DVD game | North America | 2006 |
| Dance Dance Revolution Mobile 3D | Mobile game | North America | 2005 |
| Dance Dance Revolution | Mobile game | North America | 2006-05-02 |
| Dancing Stage EuroMix | Arcade | (European Union) | 2000-07-31 |
| Dancing Stage EuroMix (re-release) | Arcade | (European Union) | 2000 |
| Dancing Stage EuroMix 2 | Arcade | (European Union) | 2002-08-06 |
| Dancing Stage Fusion | Arcade | (European Union) | April 2005 |
| Dancing Stage EuroMix | PlayStation | (European Union) | 2000-02-16 |
| Dancing Stage Party Edition | PlayStation | (European Union) | 2002-11-15 |
| Dancing Stage Fever | PlayStation | (European Union) | 2003-10-24 |
| Dancing Stage Fusion | PlayStation | (European Union) | 2004-11-05 |
| Dancing Stage MegaMix | PlayStation 2 | (European Union) | 2003-05-30 |
| Dancing Stage Fever | PlayStation 2 | (European Union) | 2003-10-24 |
| Dancing Stage Fusion | PlayStation 2 | (European Union) | 2004-11-05 |
| Dancing Stage Max | PlayStation 2 | (European Union) | 2005-11-25 |
| Dancing Stage Unleashed | Xbox | (European Union) | 2004-03-12 |
| Dancing Stage Unleashed 2 | Xbox | (European Union) | 2005-05-13 |
| Dancing Stage Unleashed 3 | Xbox | (European Union) | 2006-03-17 |
| Dancing Stage Universe | Xbox 360 | (European Union) | 2007-12-07 |
| Dancing Stage Universe 2 | Xbox 360 | (European Union) | 2008-10-03 |
| Dance Dance Revolution Winx Club | Wii | (European Union) | 2009-03-26 |
| Dancing Stage | Mobile game | (European Union) | 2005 |
| Dancing Stage DVD Game | DVD game | (European Union) | 2007 |
| Dancing Stage EuroMix | PlayStation | Oceania | 2000-02-16 |
| Dancing Stage Fever | PlayStation | Oceania | 2003-10-24 |
| Dancing Stage MegaMix | PlayStation 2 | Oceania | 2003-09-26 |
| Dancing Stage Fusion | PlayStation 2 | Oceania | 2004-10-01 |
| Dancing Stage Universe | Xbox 360 | Oceania | 2007-12-21 |
| Dance Dance Revolution DVD Game | DVD game | Oceania | 2007 |
| Dancing Stage Hottest Party | Wii | Oceania | 2008-04-11 |
| Dance Dance Revolution Classroom Edition | Windows | North America | September 2012 |
| Dance Dance Revolution Dance Wars | iOS | North America | 2013-02-14 |
| Dance Dance Revolution Dance Wars | iOS | (European Union) | 2013-02-14 |
| Dance Dance Revolution Pocket Edition | iOS | North America | 2013-10-05 |
| Dance Dance Revolution Pocket Edition | iOS | Japan | 2013-10-05 |
| Dance Dance Revolution Pocket Edition | iOS | (European Union) | 2013-10-05 |
| Dance Dance Revolution Grand Prix | Windows | Worldwide | 2021-11-08 |

== Dance Dance Revolution Solo ==
| Title | Platform | Region | Release date |
|---|---|---|---|
| Dance Dance Revolution Solo Bass Mix | Arcade | Japan | 1999-08-19 |
| Dance Dance Revolution Solo Bass Mix | Arcade | Asia | 1999-08-19 |
| Dance Dance Revolution Solo 2000 | Arcade | Japan | 1999-12-16 |
| Dance Dance Revolution Solo 2000 | Arcade | South Korea Asia | 1999-12-16 |
| Dance Dance Revolution 4thMix | Arcade | Japan | 2000-08-24 |
| Dance Dance Revolution 4thMix | Arcade | South Korea Asia | 2000-08-24 |
| Dance Dance Revolution 4thMix Plus | Arcade | Japan | 2000-12-28 |
| Dance Dance Revolution 4thMix Plus | Arcade | Asia | 2000-12-28 |

== Unreleased games ==
The gameplay screen of the preview version of Dance Dance Revolution Ultramix (top) and the gameplay screen of the released version (bottom)

=== Dance Dance Revolution Solo (International) ===
Only a test build existed in North America; this game never saw a full release outside of Asia.

Dance Dance Revolution Solo Bass Mix had a public test build in early 2000 in the United States at Konami's former test location Diversions in Chicago, IL. It was later replaced with Dance Dance Revolution USA.

Major differences from the Japanese build is the absence of 3 songs: "That's The Way '98," "Together and Forever", and "Get Off." The Nonstop Megamix course including these songs were also not present. All other functions and hidden modes were available for play including Maniac mode, Ultimate Maniac mode, Nonstop Megamix, and machine link play.

Dancing Stage Solo is a cancelled video game for Europe. Konami filed to trademark the name on July 9, 1999. It was registered on July 25, 2000, but expired ten years after filing. This game's Caution screen, high score background and title screen were present as unused game data in the Asian versions of Dance Dance Revolution Solo 2000.

=== Dance Dance Revolution Ultramix (Windows) ===
Released as Dance Dance Revolution Ultramix for the Xbox.

Originally Dance Dance Revolution Ultramix was going to be a Windows title, sequeling Dance Dance Revolution which had been released a couple of years before. Screenshots of the game under development were released to video game news sites showing an interface that closely resembled the previous Windows game. Later in development the game was completely changed visually and released on the Microsoft Xbox.

=== Dancing Stage SuperNova 2 (Europe) ===
This game was never released. Reason: PlayStation 2 and arcade board blacklist issues.

The European arcade release of Dance Dance Revolution SuperNova 2, titled Dancing Stage SuperNova 2, was never released due to importation issues surrounding the PlayStation 2-based engine. The arcade release of DDR SuperNova 2 uses an imported Japanese PlayStation 2 to power the game. The import ban came after the release of Dancing Stage SuperNova, the second Dance Dance Revolution arcade released in Europe to use a PlayStation 2 engine.

Dancing Stage SuperNova 2 was released for the European PlayStation 2 directly on October 3, 2008. The songlist is mostly based on the North American PlayStation 2 release of Dance Dance Revolution SuperNova 2 instead of the arcade release, but with 12 of the licenses removed and a new one, Cara Mia by Måns Zelmerlöw, added.

=== Dance Dance Revolution (2014) (North America) ===
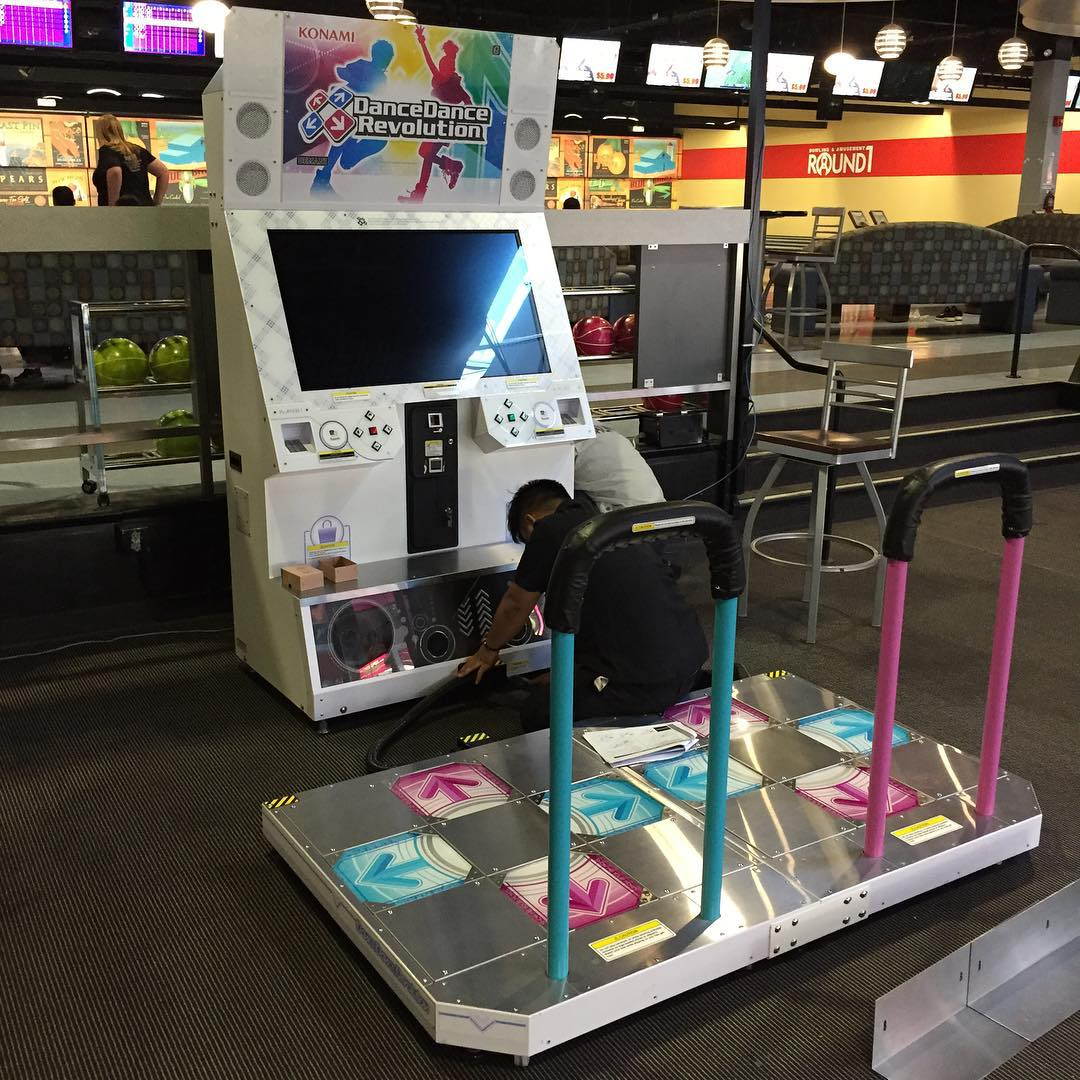
Dance Dance Revolution (2014) had a location test in USA.

Only a test build existed; this game never saw a full release in North America.

The test build was available to the public on mid 2015 in select Round 1 and Dave & Buster's shops in the United States. e-Amusement functionality was available. The game was later replaced with Dance Dance Revolution A in North America, making it the first Dance Dance Revolution release in that region since Dance Dance Revolution X2.

The USA location test of Dance Dance Revolution (2014) removed 47 songs found in the Japanese release:

- DDR (2014): 27 songs (25 U.M.U × BEMANI songs and 2 Konami originals)
- DDR (2013): 6 licensed songs
- DDR X3: 10 licensed songs
- DDR 2ndMix: 3 licensed songs ("Bad Girls" by Juliet Roberts, "Boom Boom Dollar" by King Kong & D. Jungle Girls, and "Stomp to My Beat" by JS16)
- DDR (1998): 1 licensed song ("Kung Fu Fighting" by Bus Stop featuring Carl Douglas)

=== Dance Dance Revolution A20 (Europe) ===
Only a test build existed; this game never saw a full release in Europe.

The test build was available from October 7, 2019, to March 16, 2020, at Namco Funscape in London, England. It uses a European build from August 6, 2019. As with the release of Dance Dance Revolution A in Europe, it did not offer e-Amusement functionality. The location test was concluded shortly before the United Kingdom imposed a stay-at-home order on March 23, 2020, in response to the COVID-19 pandemic. Upon reopening, the location test of A20 was replaced with an August 2018 edition of Dance Dance Revolution A.

While Dance Dance Revolution A20 was not released in Europe, Konami provided other updates to European machines:

- Dance Dance Revolution A received an offline update on May 21, 2021, in the United Kingdom. The build date is of April 15, 2021.
- Dance Dance Revolution A20 Plus was released on January 14, 2022, in Europe. The build date is of February 10, 2021 and it is an upgrade to Dance Dance Revolution A cabinets. Other regions received A20 Plus earlier, in July 2020. This European update is the first instance where a regional Plus version of Dance Dance Revolution is released without the original version being available.

== Unofficial releases ==
Dance Dance Revolution Megamix, Dance Dance Revolution Extreme Plus and Dance Dance Revolution Extreme Clean are commercial bootlegs of Dance Dance Revolution Extreme.

Dance Dance Revolution Extreme Pro and Dance Dance Revolution Extreme Clarity are fan-made unofficial patches for Dance Dance Revolution Extreme. Pro enables the Marvelous timing window in all play modes, a feature that debuted in Dance Dance Revolution SuperNova 2, while also unlocking all songs automatically and using Oni scoring in all modes. It also adds support for BrightWhite, a fan-made alternative to the memory card reader. DDR Extreme Clarity improves upon Pro by adding Slow and Fast timing indicators, a feature only available in some circumstances beginning with Dance Dance Revolution X2.

Other unofficial fan-made releases are typically powered by StepMania software, and generally use official Dance Dance Revolution releases as inspiration.

== Notes ==
- Dance Dance Revolution 2ndMix was updated after its initial release with a few new songs and the ability to connect to and play alongside Konami's DJ simulator games, Beatmania IIDX. While the official name of that version of DDR when alone was Dance Dance Revolution 2ndMix Link Version, when connected to the two Beatmania IIDX cabinets it was compatible with it was referred to by two other unique names.
- Along with the "International Versions" of Japan's DDR series, Korea specific versions of Dance Dance Revolution 3rdMix were released with a partly exclusive song list. Some of the Korean songs were later featured in the Japanese and international Dance Dance Revolution 4thMix, as well as the Plus and Solo versions. They have not been used in the DDR series since.
- Due to a licensing mishap during the launch of Dance Dance Revolution Ultramix, the game was temporarily unavailable in Canada, forcing them to wait for Konami to secure the rights to certain songs and rerelease the game for all of North America.
- The "second release" versions of Dance Dance Revolution SuperNova and Dancing Stage SuperNova in North America and Europe were a game disc replacement to fix audio syncing issues with the initial release of the game. Along with bug fixes, the discs added new songs to both versions.
