= Breakbeat =

Genre of electronic music

- Stylistic origins: Electro; freestyle; hip-hop; funk; post-disco; turntablism
- Cultural origins: Mid-1970s, US (hip-hop production); Late 1980s, US and UK (electronic genre)
- Derivative forms: Jungle; drum and bass; 2-step garage; 4-beat; breakbeat hardcore; big beat; dubstep

Subgenres
- Acid breaks; Asian breakbeat; big beat; breakcore; broken beat; deep breaks; electro breaks; Electrotech; Florida breaks; nu skool breaks; psybreaks; progressive breaks; West Coast/funky breaks

Fusion genres
- Breakstep; breakbeat hardcore

Breakbeat is a broad type of electronic music that uses drum breaks, often sampled from early recordings of funk, jazz, and R&B. Breakbeats have been used in styles such as Florida breaks, hip-hop, jungle, drum and bass, big beat, breakbeat hardcore, and UK garage styles (including 2-step, breakstep and dubstep).

== Etymology ==
The origin of the word "breakbeat" is the fact that the drum loops that were sampled occurred during a "break" in the music – for example, the Amen break (a drum solo from "Amen, Brother" by the Winstons) or the Think break (from "Think (About It)" by Lyn Collins).

== History ==
=== 1970s–1980s: Classic breaks and hip-hop production ===
Beginning in 1973 and continuing through the late 1970s and early 1980s, hip-hop turntablists such as DJ Kool Herc began using several funk breaks in a row, using drum breaks from jazz-funk tracks such as James Brown's "Funky Drummer" and the Winstons' "Amen, Brother", to form the rhythmic base for hip-hop songs.

DJ Kool Herc's breaks style involved playing the same record on two turntables and playing the break repeatedly, alternating between the two records. Grandmaster Flash perfected this idea with what he called the "quick-mix theory": he would mark the points on the record where the break began and ended with a crayon, so that he could easily replay the break by spinning the record and not touching the tone arm. This style was copied and improved upon by early hip-hop DJs Afrika Bambaataa and Grand Wizard Theodore. This style was extremely popular in clubs and dancehalls because the extended breaks compositions provided breakers with more opportunities to showcase their skills.

In the late 1970s, breakbeats had attained a large presence in hip-hop. In the 1980s, the evolution of technology began to make sampling breaks easier and more affordable for DJs and producers, which helped nurture the commercialization of hip-hop. Through early techniques such as pausing tapes and then recording the break, by the 1980s, technology allowed anybody with a tape recorder to find the breakbeat.

=== 1990s: Evolution as electronic dance genre ===
In the late-1980s, breakbeat became an essential feature of many genres of breaks music which became popular within the global dance music scene, including acid breaks, electro-funk, and Miami bass, and a decade later big beat and nu skool breaks.

In the early 1990s, acid house artists and producers started using breakbeat samples in their music to create breakbeat hardcore. The hardcore scene then diverged into subgenres like jungle and drum and bass, which generally was faster and focused more on complex sampled drum patterns. An example of this is Goldie's album Timeless. Josh Lawford of Ravescene prophesied that breakbeat was "the death-knell of rave" because the ever-changing drumbeat patterns of breakbeat music didn't allow for the same zoned out, trance-like state that the standard, steady 4/4 beats of house enabled.

Incorporating many components of those genres, the Florida breaks subgenre followed during the early-to-mid 1990s and had a unique sound that was soon internationally popular among producers, DJs, and club-goers.

In 1994, the influential techno act Autechre released Anti EP in response to the Criminal Justice and Public Order Act 1994, deliberately using advanced algorithmic programming to generate non-repetitive breakbeats for the full duration of the tracks, in order to subvert the legal definitions within that legislation which specified in the section creating police powers to remove ravers from raves that "'music' includes sounds wholly or predominantly characterised by the emission of a succession of repetitive beats".

In the late 1990s, another style of breakbeat emerged, 'big beat', a style that was incorporating elements of trance, hip-hop and jungle. It was pioneered by the Chemical Brothers and James Lavelle's Mo'Wax imprint. The genre had commercial peak in 1997, when such music was topping in pop charts and often featured in commercials. The most notable artists of the sound were the Prodigy, Death in Vegas, the Crystal Method, and Propellerheads.

In the 2020s, breakbeats became a common signature in songs done by British popstar PinkPantheress.

== Characteristics ==
The tempo of breaks tracks, ranging from 110 to 175 beats per minute, allows DJs to mix breaks with a wide range of different genres in their sets. This has led to breakbeats being used in many hip-hop, jungle, drum and bass and hardcore tracks. They can also be heard in other music, anywhere from popular music to background music in car and clothing commercials on radio or TV.

=== The "Amen break" ===
The Amen break, a drum break from the Winstons' song "Amen, Brother" is widely regarded as one of the most widely used and sampled breaks among music using breakbeats. One of the earliest uses of the Amen break was on "King of the Beats" by Mantronix, and has since been used in thousands of songs. Other popular breaks are from James Brown's "Funky Drummer" (1970) and "Give It Up or Turnit a Loose" (1969), the Incredible Bongo Band's 1973 cover of the Shadows' "Apache", and Lyn Collins's 1972 song "Think (About It)". The Winstons have not received royalties for third-party use of samples of the break recorded on their original music release.

== Sampled breakbeats ==
With the advent of digital sampling and music editing on the computer, breakbeats have become much easier to create and use. Now, instead of cutting and splicing tape sections or constantly backspinning two records at the same time, a computer program can be used to cut, paste, and loop breakbeats endlessly. Digital effects such as filters, reverb, reversing, time stretching and pitch shifting can be added to the beat, and even to individual sounds by themselves. Individual instruments from within a breakbeat can be sampled and combined with others, thereby creating wholly new breakbeat patterns.

=== Legal issues ===
With the rise in popularity of breakbeat music and the advent of digital audio samplers, companies started selling "breakbeat packages" for the express purpose of helping artists create breakbeats. A breakbeat kit CD would contain many breakbeat samples from different songs and artists, often without the artist's permission or even knowledge.

== Subgenres ==
=== Acid breaks ===
"Acid breaks" or "chemical breaks" is acid house, but with a breakbeat instead of a house beat. One of the earliest synthesizers to be employed in acid music was the Roland TB-303, which makes use of a resonant low-pass filter to emphasize the harmonics of the sound.

=== Asian breakbeat ===
The Asian breakbeat scene is a remix genre blending elements of freestyle, electro, progressive trance melodies, Florida breaks drums and Southern crunk rap. It was originated and made popular by predominantly Vietnamese American and Southeast Asian DJs throughout the U.S. South (Louisiana, Texas, Mississippi, Missouri, North Carolina) during the 1990s and 2000s. Notable active DJs include New Orleans's DJ Babyboi, Tinman, and Loopy.

=== Big beat ===
Big beat is a term employed since the mid-1990s by the British music press to describe much of the music by artists such as the Prodigy, Cut La Roc, Fatboy Slim, the Chemical Brothers, the Crystal Method and Propellerheads typically driven by heavy breakbeats combined with four-on-the floor kick drums, synthesizer-generated loops and patterns in common with established forms of electronic dance music such as techno and acid house.

=== Electro breaks ===
Breakbeat combined with electro music, often using 80s synths, robotic sounds, vocals with vocoders or talkboxes, and infused with elements of funk. Electro breaks was pioneered by Afrika Bambaataa & the Soulsonic Force, Kraftwerk, Man Parrish, Cybotron, and Newcleus.

=== Andalusian breakbeat ===
In Spain from the mid-1990s to early 2000s, breakbeat became a massive social movement, especially in the southern part of the country, Andalusia.

Largely responsible for the spread of the "broken rhythm" in Andalusia, was the public radio station of the autonomous community: Canal Sur Radio and Canal Fiesta, known at that time as Fórmula 1, where the program "Mundo Evassion" was broadcast, or "Evassion Planet" which was presented by Dani Moreno. Artists of that era included Digital Base, Dj Nitro, Jordi Slate, Man, Wally, Kultur, Jan B, Anuschka, and Ale Baquero.

The breakbeat of Andalusia has formed its own style, based on a simple structure of pre breaks + pre drop + drop. All this is repeated a second time with some variations in the song. With this structure, the tracks are mixed when one has passed the drop, until the pre drop of the next one arrives, respecting the melodies without breaks.

Andalusian breakbeat has once again become a mass industry, with festivals almost exclusively dedicated to this genre, such as the Winter Festival, Summer Festival, Floridance, Retro Fest, and Olibass.

=== Progressive breaks ===
"Amidst the Raindrops"
A clip of downtempo progressive breaks music.

Progressive breaks or prog breaks, also known as atmospheric breaks, is a subgenre of breaks that is essentially a fusion of breakbeat and progressive house. Much like progressive house, this subgenre is characterized by its "trancey" sound. Its defining traits include extended synthesizer pads and washes, melodic synth leads, heavy reverberation, and electronic breakbeats. However, unlike progressive house, very few progressive breaks tracks have vocals, with most tracks being entirely instrumental or using only electronically altered snippets of vocal samples for sonic effect. Typical progressive breaks tracks will often have a long build-up section that leads to a breakdown and a climax, often having numerous sonic elements being added or subtracted from the track at various intervals in order to increase its intensity. Progressive breaks artists include Hybrid, BT, Way Out West, Digital Witchcraft, Momu, Wrecked Angle, Fourthstate, Burufunk, Under This and Fretwell.

== See also ==
- Breakdance
- Electro
- List of electronic music genres
- Syncopation
