= Color Me Country =

Studio album by Linda Martell
- Released: August 1970
- Recorded: July 1969
- Studio: Singleton Sound (Nashville)
- Genre: Country; country pop
- Length: 27:37
- Label: Plantation
- Producer: Shelby Singleton

Singles from Color Me Country
- 1. "Color Him Father" Released: July 1969; 2. "Before the Next Teardrop Falls" Released: November 1969; 3. "Bad Case of the Blues" Released: February 1970; 4. "You're Crying Boy, Crying" Released: November 1970

Color Me Country is the only album by American country artist Linda Martell. It was released in August 1970 via Plantation Records and was produced by Shelby Singleton. The album contained three charting singles by Martell, including her cover of "Color Him Father". The album also reached a charting position following its original release. It has since been reissued in several formats and has received positive reviews since its original release date.

== Background and content ==
Linda Martell was one of country music's first commercially successful black performers. She was also the first black female performer to sing at the Grand Ole Opry. Originally, Martell made an unsuccessful attempt as an R&B performer in the early 1960s. In the latter half of the decade, she met William "Duke" Rayner, who believed in her potential for a career in country music. Through a meeting with producer Shelby Singleton, Martell signed a recording contract with Plantation Records in May 1969 and began recording her first album thereafter. Under the production of Singleton, Color Me Country was recorded in 1969 at Singleton Sound Studios, located in Nashville, Tennessee. All of the album's tracks were cut in a single work day that altogether took 12 hours to complete.

The album contained a total of eleven tracks, with five songs on side one and six on side two. On the opening track, "Bad Case of the Blues", Martell can be heard yodeling. Meanwhile, other tracks, such as "I Almost Called Your Name", were cut in a ballad style. Its closing track, "Before the Next Teardrop Falls", was a cover that would later be made most commercially successful by Freddy Fender. According to Rolling Stone, Singleton told Martell what songs to record and how to record them. He had obtained a copy of the Winstons' pop hit, "Color Him Father", and told her to record it.

== Release and reception ==
Color Me Country was released in August 1970 on Plantation Records. It was Martell's only major release in her career. Color Me Country spent two weeks on the Billboard Top Country Albums chart, peaking at number 40 in October 1970.

Three singles were spawned from the album; its first was Martell's cover of "Color Him Father", issued in July 1969. The single spent ten weeks on the Billboard Hot Country Songs chart and peaked at number 22 on the list in September 1969. It was Martell's highest-charting single release on the country songs chart. In November 1969, Martell's cover of "Before the Next Teardrop Falls" was issued as the record's second single. The song spent eight weeks on the Billboard country chart and peaked at number 33 in January 1970. "Bad Case of the Blues" was issued as the third single in February 1970. Spending six weeks on the country chart, it peaked at number 58 two months later. It was also Martell's last charting single. The final single was "You're Crying Boy, Crying"; issued in November 1970, it did not chart.

In 2014, the album was released on CD via Real Gone Music. It was later reissued to digital and streaming services in the 2010s, including Apple Music.

Professional ratings
Review scores
Source	Rating
AllMusic	3.5/5 stars
Pitchfork	7.5/10

Color Me Country received positive reviews from music critics and journalists following its release. It was first reviewed in September 1970 by Billboard magazine, who called Martell "the female Charley Pride". Writers also found that she had a musical style that fit country music and they highlighted the tracks "Color Him Father", "Bad Case of the Blues" and "The Wedding Cake".

Retrospectives were also positive. Mark Deming of AllMusic rated the album three and a half stars, finding her to be a country performer who seemed to have never reached her full potential: "Color Me Country makes it clear that wasn't because of a lack of talent, and this is a fascinating and entertaining curio from a forgotten country music pioneer," he concluded. David Browne of Rolling Stone called the album's production to be "lean and spunky, making her sound like the equal of Loretta Lynn or Tammy Wynette". A 2023 review from Lawrence Burney of Pitchfork described it as "a lovely but tragic record" on which "Martell's singing is sweet [and] mellifluous", although found that "the umph in her voice on songs with the Anglos" is not present.

== Track listing ==
All tracks written by Margaret Lewis and Myra Smith, except where noted.

Side one
No.	Title	Writer(s)	Length
1.	"Bad Case of the Blues"		2:28
2.	"San Francisco Is a Lonely Town"	Ben Peters	2:55
3.	"The Wedding Cake"		2:20
4.	"Tender Leaves of Love"		2:48
5.	"I Almost Called Your Name"		2:06

Side two
No.	Title	Writer(s)	Length
1.	"Color Him Father"	Richard Lewis Spencer	2:46
2.	"There Never Was a Time"		2:50
3.	"You're Crying Boy, Crying"	Fred Burch	2:28
4.	"Old Letter Song"		2:28
5.	"Then I'll Be Over You"	Peters	1:51
6.	"Before the Next Teardrop Falls"	Vivian Keith; Peters	2:05

== Personnel ==
All credits are adapted from AllMusic and are from the 2014 version of Color Me Country.

Musical and technical personnel

- Gordon Anderson – reissue producer
- Bill Dahl – liner notes
- Tom Kline – reissue design
- Linda Martell – lead vocals
- Mike Milchner – remastering
- Shelby Singleton – producer
- Joe Venneri – engineer

== Chart performance ==
Chart performance for Color Me Country
Chart (1970)	Peak position
US Top Country Albums (Billboard)	40

== Release history ==
Release history and formats for Color Me Country
Region	Date	Format	Label	Ref.
United States	August 1970	Vinyl	Plantation	
United States	2014	CD	Real Gone Music	
Europe	2014	CD	Plantation	
United States	2014	Digital; streaming	Plantation	
