= B-LIVE =

Concert series

B-LIVE is a global concert series that showcases international and emerging artists. A program of music events that has toured 25 countries, it is a ticketed event for adults ages 21 and over.

== History ==
B-LIVE has taken place in over 25 countries, including the United Kingdom, Spain, Italy, New Zealand, Brazil and Mexico. It is orchestrated and presented by Bacardi Rum.

== B-LIVE 2007 ==
In November 2007, B-LIVE visited Los Angeles whose lineup had an international Latin appeal. Featured artists included "The Queen of Spanish Rock," Alejandra Guzmán from Mexico; three time Latin Grammy award winner Calle 13 from Puerto Rico; Latin rockers Maldita Vecindad from Mexico, and one of Colombia's original rock bands, Aterciopelados. The concert took place at historic Olvera Street in Los Angeles, California.

B-LIVE benefited the city of Los Angeles by donating $25,000 to the National Hispanic Foundation for the Arts.

== B-LIVE 2008 ==
During the fall of 2008, Live Tour, a performance of DJs made its way across the United States featuring turntable greats such as: Mix Master Mike, DJ Z-Trip, DJ JS-1, DJ A-Dog, and DJ Troublemaker.

The Live Tour visited the following cities:

Columbia, Missouri; Lawrence, Kansas; Kansas City, Missouri; St. Cloud, Minnesota; Minneapolis, Minnesota; West Lafayette, Indiana; Bloomington, Illinois; Champaign, Illinois; Columbus, Ohio; Cleveland, Ohio; College Park, Maryland; State College, Pennsylvania; Morgantown, West Virginia; Morgantown, West Virginia; Austin, Texas and Dallas, Texas.

== B-LIVE 2009 ==
In summer of 2009 there were performances in 24 cities.

The 2009 B-LIVE Press Party Artist Roster included:

- MSTRKRFT
- A-Trak
- Chromeo
- Diplo
- Kid Sister
- Drop the Lime
- DJ Steve Porter
- DJ Jazzy Jeff
- James Murphy of LCD Sound System
- Para One
- Auto Erotique
- Craig Pettigrew
- Sydney Blu

=== B-LIVE ===
Some of the artists performing in B-LIVE 2009 events include:

Toronto-based duo, MSTRKRFT; Fool's Gold label head and Kanye West DJ, A-Trak; best known for his early career with Will Smith, DJ Jazzy Jeff; in collaboration with Major Lazer featuring Diplo and Switch; Montreal-born DJ and producer, Tiga; New York based dance music producer and remixer, DJ Steve Porter; LA based producer, Z-Trip; punk/dance duo from Brooklyn, New York, Matt and Kim; hip-hop artist and singer; Q-Tip; and special guest Santigold.

B-LIVE events visited the following US cities in the summer of 2009:

Date	City	Country
May 30, 2009	Phoenix	United States
June 3, 2009	Denver	United States
June 6, 2009	Kansas City	United States
June 11, 2009	Milwaukee	United States
June 12, 2009	Chicago	United States
June 17, 2009	New York City	United States
June 18, 2009	Boston	United States
June 19, 2009	Philadelphia	United States
June 20, 2009	Washington, D.C.	United States
June 25, 2009	Louisville	United States
June 26, 2009	Cleveland	United States
June 27, 2009	Columbus	United States
July 1, 2009	Charlotte	United States
July 3, 2009	Atlanta	United States
July 4, 2009	Orlando	United States
July 8, 2009	New Orleans	United States

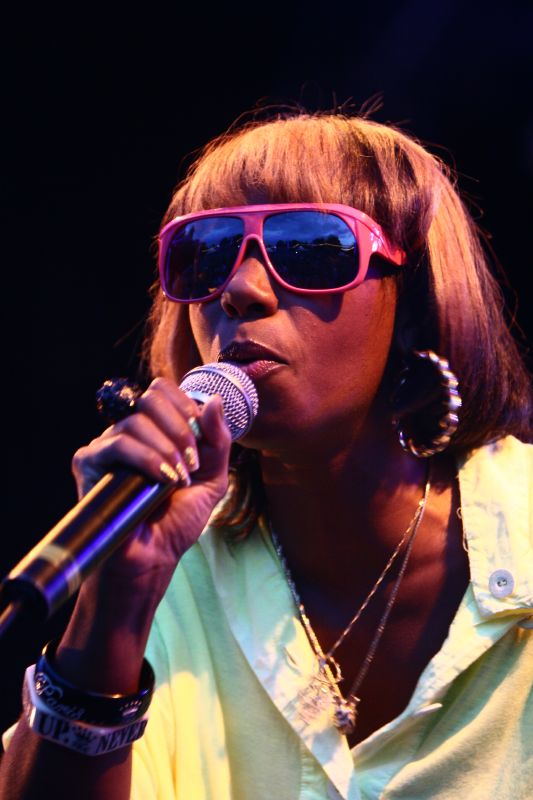
Santigold at Eurockéennes (2008)

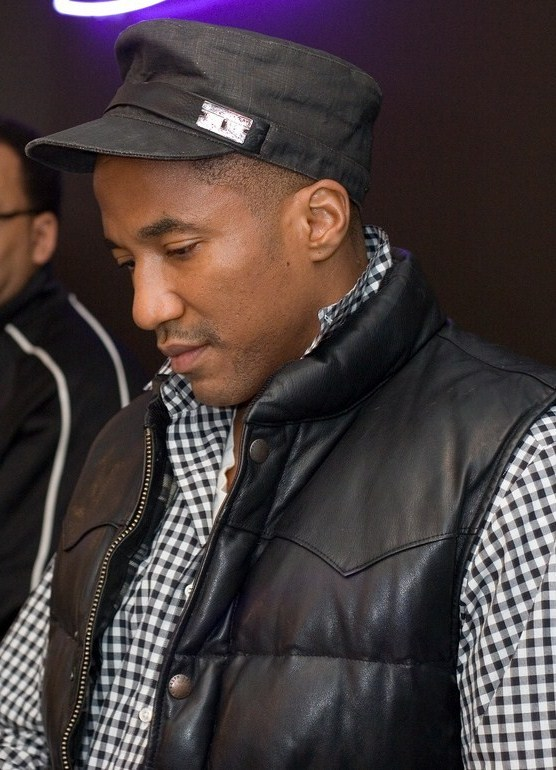
Q-Tip at the Commonwealth in Washington, D.C. (2008)

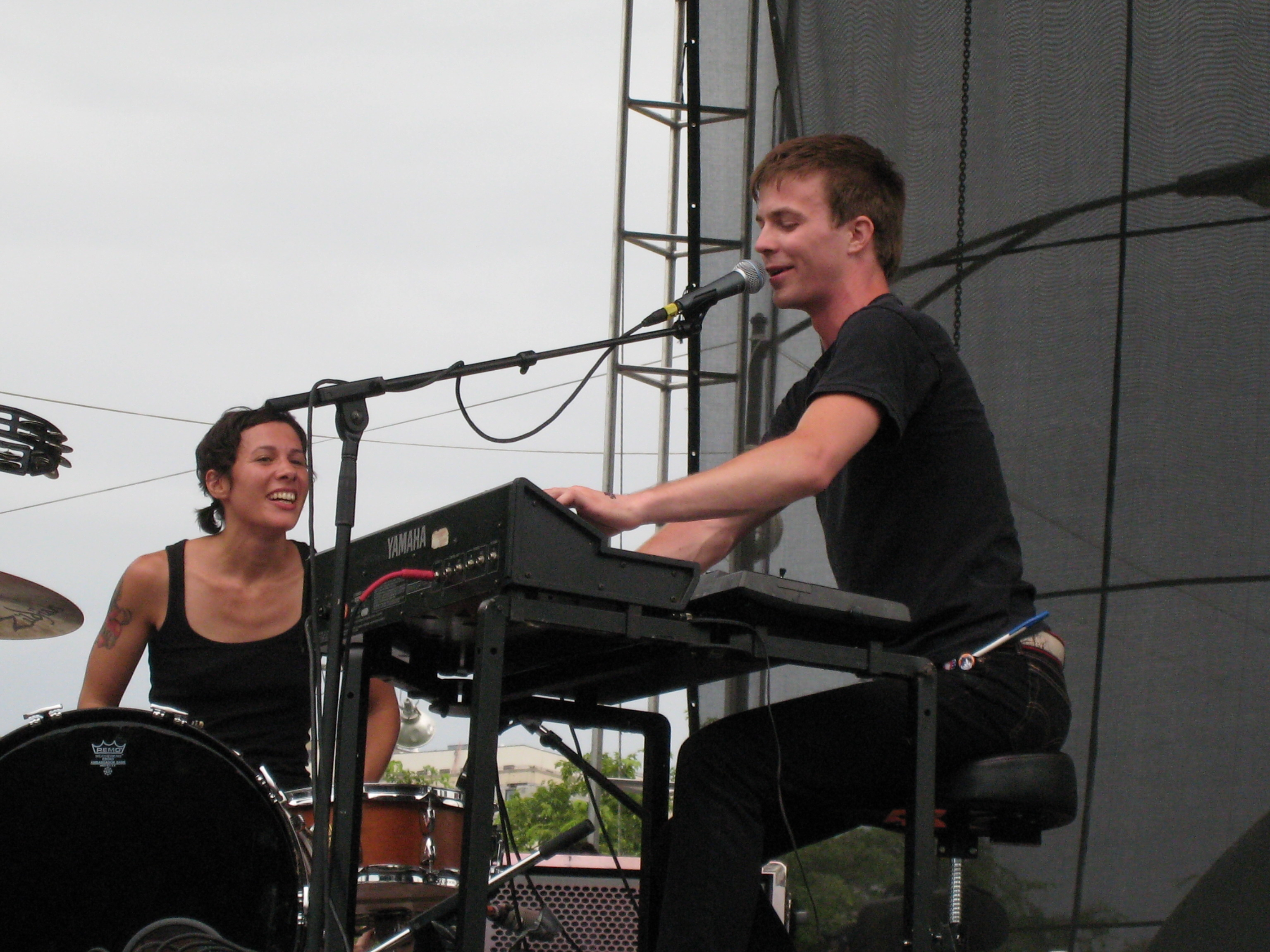
Matt and Kim at Lollapalooza (2007)

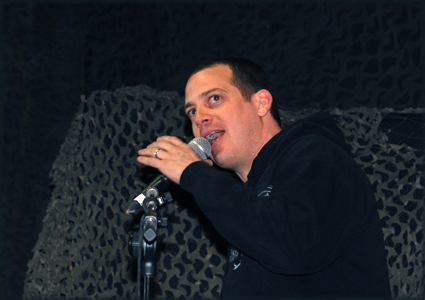
DJ Z-Trip during a concert at Camp Buehring, Kuwait (2008)

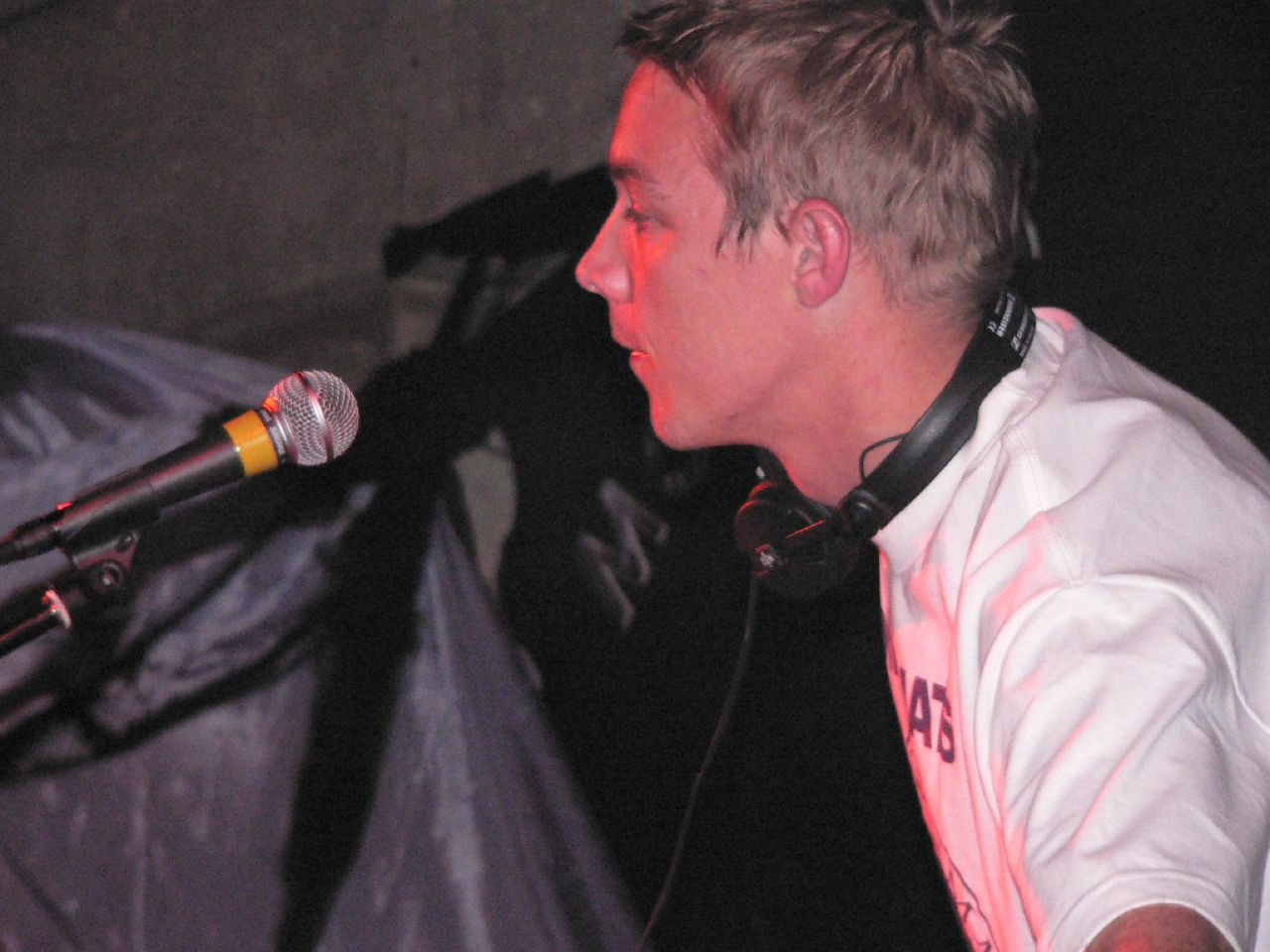
Diplo

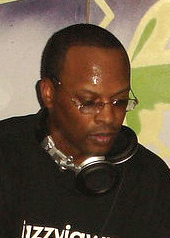
DJ Jazzy Jeff

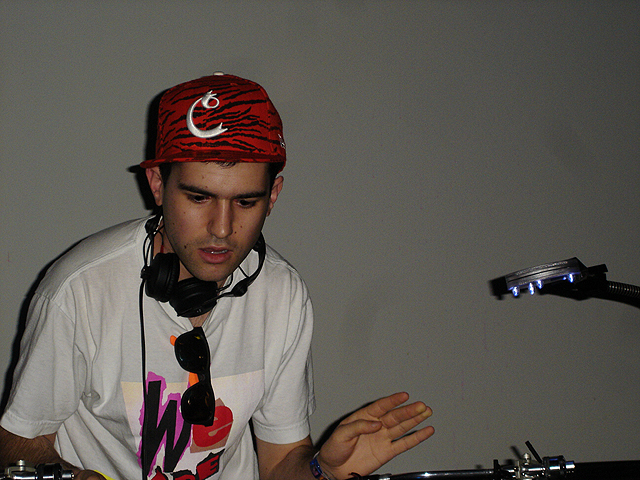
A-Trak live at Nextdoor, Honolulu, HI

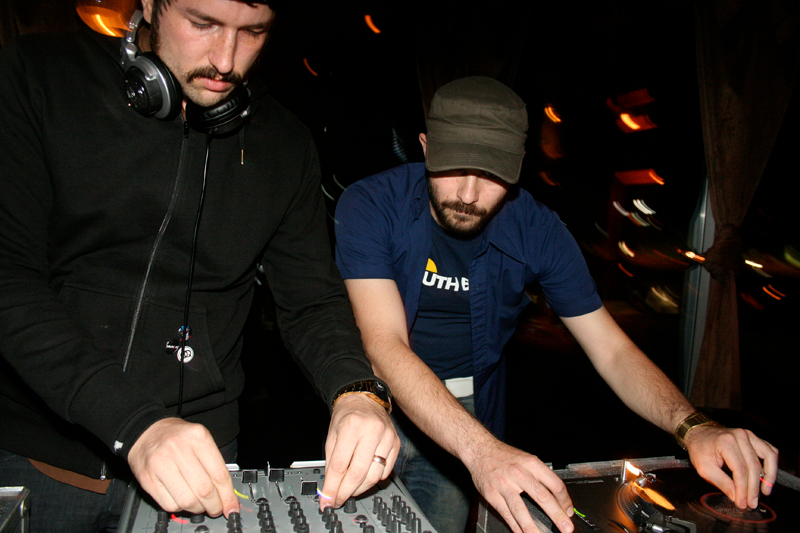
MSTRKRFT spinning at Sotto Zero in Toronto, Canada (2007)
