= Bad Case of the Blues =

Single by Linda Martell

from the album Color Me Country
- B-side: "Old Letter Song"
- Released: February 1970
- Studio: Singleton Sound Studios
- Genre: Country; country pop
- Length: 2:20
- Label: Plantation
- Songwriter(s): Margaret Lewis; Myra Smith
- Producer(s): Shelby Singleton

Linda Martell singles chronology
"Before the Next Teardrop Falls" (1969)	"Bad Case of the Blues" (1970)	"You're Crying Boy, Crying" (1970)

"Bad Case of the Blues" is a song by American country music artist Linda Martell. It was first composed by Margaret Lewis and Myra Smith. The song was released as the third single from Martell's 1970 studio album, Color Me Country. It reached a charting position on the Billboard country chart soon after.

== Background and content ==
Linda Martell was country music's first commercially successful female country artist. She had her first hit in 1969 with a cover of the pop hit, "Color Him Father." The single reached the top 25 of the country chart. "Bad Case of the Blues" was among the follow-up single releases to "Color Him Father." It was first included as the opening track on Martell's 1970 album. On the song, Martell can be heard yodeling in a high-pitch country style. The song had been composed by songwriters Margaret Lewis and Myra Smith. Both female composers had also co-written five tracks that appeared on her 1970 album. "Bad Case of the Blues" was recorded at the Singleton Sound Studio, located in Nashville, Tennessee. The session took place in 1969 and was produced by Shelby Singleton.

== Release and reception ==
"Bad Case of the Blues" was first released as a single in February 1970 on Plantation Records. It was Martell's third single release off the label. The song charted on the Billboard Hot Country Songs survey for six weeks and peaked at number 58 by April 1970. "Bad Case of the Blues" was Martell's final charting single in her music career. It has since received notably reception from journalists and writers. Mark Deming commented in his 1970 album review of Color Me Country, that Martell's yodeling on the track was "credible." Katie Moulton of Oxford American magazine reviewed the song in 2019 and called it "compelling" despite not appearing to be so. "She infuses it with the dissonance of self-knowledge, even as she takes her problems home to Mama in the country and deprecatingly calls herself "Miss Smarty'," Moulton commented.

== Track listing ==
7" vinyl single

- "Bad Case of the Blues" –2:20
- "Old Letter Song" – 2:36

== Charts ==
=== Weekly charts ===
Chart (1970)	Peak position
US Hot Country Songs (Billboard)	58
