= Loöq Records =

20th century American record label

- Founded: 1998
- Founder: DJs Jondi & Spesh
- Country of origin: United States

Loöq Records is a record label founded by electronic music producers and DJs Jondi & Spesh in 1998. Like Jondi & Spesh, Loöq is based in San Francisco, California. They have featured over 70 releases from such artists as Momu and Digital Witchcraft.

== See also ==
- List of record labels
