= Momu =

American record production duo

- Genres: Dance music
- Members: John David Moyer; Mark Musselman

Momu is an American electronic music duo, consisting of John David Moyer (of Jondi & Spesh fame) and Mark Musselman. The pair began making music together after meeting at Qoöl, a party organized by Moyer.

They have released records on labels such as Loöq Records and Bedrock Breaks. Additionally, they have had singles featured in the Global Underground series.

They are one of the foremost DJ teams of breaks music in the United States. They mainly operate in San Francisco. Momu has also appeared as a special guest DJ on programs such as John Digweed's Kiss 100 show and also special guests on Proton Radio.
