= Linda Martell =

American country and R&B music artist

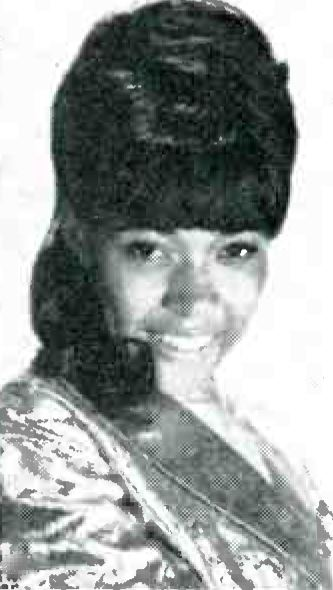
- Linda Martell in Record World magazine, 1970
- Born: Thelma Bynem; June 4, 1941 (age 85); Leesville, South Carolina, U.S.
- Occupation: Singer
- Years active: 1962–2011; 2014; 2024
- Spouses: Clark Thompson (m. 1960; div. 1966); Ted Jacobs (divorced)
- Children: 3
- Musical career
- Genres: Country; R&B
- Instrument: Vocals
- Labels: Fire; Plantation; Vee-Jay

Linda Martell (born Thelma Bynem; June 4, 1941) is an American singer. She became the first commercially successful Black female artist in the country music field and the first to play the Grand Ole Opry. As one of the first African-American country performers, Martell helped influence the careers of future Nashville artists of color.

Born and raised in South Carolina, Martell listened to country, gospel and R&B music. In her teens, she formed a singing trio with her family titled Linda Martell and the Anglos. During the 1960s, the group recorded a handful of R&B singles and sang alongside other Black performers. However, the group had little success and soon parted ways. Performing as a solo act, Martell was discovered singing country music on an air force base. This led to an introduction to producer Shelby Singleton, who signed her to his Nashville label in 1969. The same year, the label released her country cover of "Color Him Father". The song became a top 25 single on the US Hot Country Songs chart and her debut album followed in 1970.

Martell made several appearances on country music television programs and released two more singles with Plantation. She also made her first appearance on the Grand Ole Opry during this time. She later performed there 12 times. Following a series of business conflicts with her manager (Duke Raymer) and producer, Martell left her recording contract. She then retired from the country music industry in 1974 following a lack of success. Over the next several decades, she lived in various states and continued performing music. To make a living, she worked in public education and returned to South Carolina in the 1990s.

In 2021, the CMT Music Awards honored Martell with the Equal Play Award. In March 2024, Martell was featured on two tracks of Beyoncé's eighth studio album Cowboy Carter, including "Spaghettii", which generated her first Grammy Awards nomination.

== Early years ==
Thelma Bynem was born June 4, 1941 as one of five children born to Clarence and Willie May Bynem in Leesville, South Carolina. Her father was a sharecropper while her mother worked many hours at a chicken slaughterhouse. To avoid helping with sharecropping duties, Martell learned to make dinners for her family when she was seven years old. Her father was also a preacher, which inspired her earliest music. She sang gospel music at church and was also drawn to country music. Clarence Bynem regularly listened to the country music of Hank Williams on WLAC, based out of Nashville, Tennessee. "Until we got into our teens we knew country music and that was it," she told the Courier-Post in 1998. Martell, her sister and cousin then formed a singing trio, which they called The Anglos. The group performed R&B music and sang in areas around Columbia, South Carolina. Local DJ, Charles "Big Saul" Greene convinced her to change her name from Thelma Bynem to Linda Martell. "Your name is Linda Martell. You look like Linda. That fits you," Greene told her.

== Career ==
=== 1962–1969: R&B beginnings and musical shift ===
In 1962, The Anglos took an eight-hour bus ride to Muscle Shoals, Alabama where they recorded their first R&B single. Re-named Linda Martell and the Anglos, Fire Records released "A Little Tear (Was Falling from My Eyes)" the same year. The single was unsuccessful. The group performed regularly. They also sang backup vocals for R&B performers, such as The Drifters and Jimmy Hughes. Linda Martell and the Anglos (sometimes credited as "The Angelos") released several more singles on the Vee-Jay label, such as "Lonely Hours". David Browne of Rolling Stone called the song "simmering, forlorn girl-group pop".

The group had recorded "Backfield in Motion" (no connection to the Mel & Tim song of the same name) which was released in 1964. This song was composed by Elzie Bynem, who was Linda Martell's brother. It was advertised in the 7 March 1964 issue of Cash Box, and the impression given was that "Backfield in Motion" was to be the A side, and "Bad Motorcycle" the B side. The recordings were issued on Tollie 9003. However, it appears that "Bad Motorcycle" at some later stage turned out to be the A side. "Backfield in Motion" was a Cash Box Newcomer Pick for the week of 14 March 1964. The single did have some potential, and the reviewer in the 14 March issue of Cash Box said it could be flying high in the weeks to come. It did get airplay in Philadelphia and for the week of 1 August, it was one of the seven singles in the Billboard Requests and Good Programming section of the "Analysis of Philadelphia Market" list by Georgie Woods and Jimmy Bishop of WDAS. The song was covered by Joe South and the Believers, and issued on the Columbia label. The credited Composer for that release was L. Martell, who is believed to be her Brother Elzie aka Lee Martell. Interestingly, Joe South's other group, The Chips had recorded for the Tollie label.

The group parted ways after her cousin got married. Her sister left the group soon after and Martell was a solo act for the first time in her career. For several years, she continued singing R&B music. While singing on a South Carolina air force base, Martell was heard singing country songs by Nashville furniture salesman William "Duke" Rayner. He offered to arrange for a demo record to be made, but Martell originally declined his offers thinking he was a "kook". However, after much encouragement, Martell accepted his proposal and Rayner became her manager. With the recent country music success of Charley Pride, Rayner believed Martell could be accepted within the same industry. "I figured that if I could find a colored girl that could sing country and western, I'd really have something," he told Ebony in 1970. She then flew to Nashville where she met producer Shelby Singleton. With Rayner present as well, Martell recorded a demo record. She also met with Singleton who convinced her to record as a country singer. Martell was surprised at the decision. "I was a little bit shocked! I was mostly doing pop. But he said, 'You gotta go country'," she told Rolling Stone in 2020.

=== 1969–1974: Country music success ===
On May 15, 1969, Martell signed a management contract with Rayner and signed with Singleton's Plantation record label the next day. The Plantation nameplate (whose name derived from slave plantations in the American South) was disliked by Martell. However, she felt she had no choice but to go along with it. Soon after her signing, Singleton found material for Martell to record for the label. Among the first records he found was "Color Him Father", a then-recent pop song by The Winstons. She recorded the song (and ten other tracks) in one 12-hour work session. The song was issued as Martell's first Plantation single in July 1969. It climbed to number 22 on the US country songs chart. Its follow-up was Martell's interpretation of "Before the Next Teardrop Falls", which was later covered by Freddy Fender. Martell's version reached number 33 on the US country chart in 1970. In August 1970, her debut album was released on Plantation Records titled Color Me Country. The record reached number 40 on the US Country LP's chart. The album was reviewed favorably by Billboard in 1970, which found her country singing style to be authentic. In later years, AllMusic rated the record three and a half stars with similar commentary. Her final charting single was issued around the same time titled "Bad Case of the Blues".

With her new success, Martell was hired by booking agent, Hubert Long, who helped arrange several entertainment opportunities. She soon made television appearances on The Bill Anderson Show and Hee Haw in 1970. She also made her debut on the Grand Ole Opry radio broadcast after Rayner played her recent record for an official at the company. With her Opry debut, she became the first black female artist to play the show and eventually performed there a total of 12 times. In the American south, she was marketed as the "First Female Negro Country Artist" and was put on package shows with country artists Waylon Jennings and Hank Snow. Martell later recalled that performing as a black country artist was often challenging. She remembered being taunted by white audiences, who often shouted racial slurs while she was performing. "You're gonna run into hecklers, and I did...You felt pretty awful," she told Rolling Stone.

As Martell's country music career progressed "the taunting lessened but never entirely went away", according to Rolling Stone. The name-calling continued to cause her professional conflict, but Martell continued performing nonetheless. She also ran into other professional conflicts. In May 1970, Rayner sued her because he believed he deserved a higher commission. Singleton helped bring attention away from the lawsuit. Singleton also informed Martell that he would not be promoting her as heavily because he found that label-peer Jeannie C. Riley was selling more records. Martell then left her contract with Plantation and cut several tunes for a different label. Singleton found out and threatened to sue the company. "He blackballed me...It ruined my reputation in country music," she recalled in 2020. After several more years of limited success, Martell ultimately chose to retire from the Nashville music industry.

=== 1975–present: Other music opportunities and career switch ===
After leaving Nashville, Martell remained active in other sectors of music. For about two decades, she sang in small clubs in different parts of the United States. This included California, Florida and New York City. In these different places, Martell held various jobs, including entertaining on a cruise ship and opening a record shop. In 1991, she returned to South Carolina to be closer to her children. To make a better living, she became a bus driver for her home region's school district. She also continued to perform in a band on weekends where they entertained functions such as family reunions, weddings and fraternity celebrations. While many residents of her local area were not aware of her former success, co-workers at her school building did. In one high school assembly, a principal spoke of her earlier work: "Others study about black history. We have black history right here in our own school."

In the mid 2000s, Martell retired from her public school career and last performed publicly in 2011 with her band, Eazzy. In January 2014, the Swedish TV program entitled Jills veranda – Nashville (translated as Jill's Porch – Nashville) documented the search for and interview of Martell. The show's hosts traveled to South Carolina to meet Martell, discuss her music and why she abandoned her recording career. The hosts also performed with Martell on some of her songs. She became a topic of conversation in 2020 after country artist Rissi Palmer named her Apple Music podcast after Martell's 1970 album, Color Me Country. She also supports the underrepresented voices of BIPOC artists in country music through the Color Me Country™ Artist Grant Fund. In 2021, a GoFundMe campaign was launched by Martell's granddaughter to create a documentary about her career and struggles as a black performer in Nashville.

In 2024, Martell appeared on Beyoncé's country-focused eighth studio album Cowboy Carter. She made two spoken-word appearances on the tracks "Spaghettii" and "The Linda Martell Show". On Instagram, Martell commented, "I am proud that @beyonce is exploring her country music roots. What she is doing is beautiful, and I’m honored to be a part of it. It’s Beyoncé, after all!" At the 67th Annual Grammy Awards "Spaghettii" received a nomination for Best Melodic Rap Performance, becoming Martell's first nomination at the ceremony.

== Artistry and influence ==
Martell's musical artistry combined elements of country, gospel, and R&B music. Writers at Ebony magazine characterized her voice as having "gutsy, emotional soul", while also having a "background that is rich in gospel and rhythm and blues". Martell herself drew similar connections when discussing the way she approached recording "Color Him Father" in the studio. Writer David Browne commented that she delivered the song in a performance that was "a little bit country and a little bit R&B." When discussing her country style, Martell explained the storytelling aspect of the genre: "Country music tells a story...When you choose a song and you can feel it, that's what made me feel great about what I was singing. I did a lot of country songs, and I loved every one of them. Because they just tell a story." Katie Moulton of the Oxford American also highlighted Martell's country intonation in an article. Moulton also compared her musical delivery to that of torch singers like Dusty Springfield and Dinah Washington.

Martell was among country music's first black artists to have commercial success. Her career in country music helped inspire careers of other black artists in the industry, including Kane Brown and Mickey Guyton. In 2020, Guyton recalled searching on the internet for "black women country singers" and was surprised to find Martell's music. "I didn't even know she existed...I felt really bad when I discovered that I didn’t know," she recounted. Brown reflected similarly: "Color was a thing back then. It's still a thing today, but it was worse back then. She was so brave." Fellow black country artist Rissi Palmer commented to NPR that by creating her 2020 podcast she was "paying homage to the foundation on which my house is built, and that is Linda Martell."

Martell was honored with the Equal Play Award at the 2021 CMT Music Awards. It was given to recognize her work as a female black performer in country music. A tribute during the broadcast was given by Darius Rucker, Carrie Underwood, Rissi Palmer, Rhiannon Giddens, Jennifer Nettles and Mickey Guyton.

== Personal life ==
Martell has been married twice. At age 19, she first wed drummer Clark Thompson. The couple had three children. In 1966, the pair separated and she later remarried business owner, Ted Jacobs. Jacobs also brought one child from his first marriage and the family lived in Nashville while Martell was signed to Plantation Records. She discussed her domestic life with Ebony magazine in 1970, explaining the challenges associated with being a traveling performer while also being a wife and mother. "I'm used to spending time with my family," she recalled.

After leaving the country industry, Jacobs and Martell separated. Jacobs' business partner and Martell then started a romantic relationship. Together, the couple traveled and lived in several states before Martell returned to South Carolina. In 2004, she was diagnosed with breast cancer and underwent radiation treatment. Making a full recovery, she later moved in with one of her children in South Carolina.

== Discography ==
=== Albums ===
List of studio albums, with selected chart positions, and other relevant details
Title	Album details	Peak chart positions
Title	Album details	US Country
Color Me Country	Released: August 1970; Label: Plantation; Formats: LP	40

=== Singles ===
List of singles, with selected chart positions, showing other relevant details
Title	Year	Peak chart positions		Album
Title	Year	US Billboard Country	US Cashbox Country	Album
"A Little Tear (Was Falling from My Eyes)" (Note: Credited as "Linda Martell and the Anglos".)	1962	—	—	—N/a
"Lonely Hours" (Note: Credited as "Linda Martell and the Angelos".)	1963	—	—	—N/a
"Color Him Father"	1969	22	23	Color Me Country
"Before the Next Teardrop Falls"	1969	33	56	Color Me Country
"Bad Case of the Blues"	1970	58	56	Color Me Country
"You're Crying Boy, Crying"	1970	—	55	Color Me Country
"—" denotes a recording that did not chart or was not released in that territory.

=== Other appearances ===
List of non-single guest appearances, with other performing artists, showing year released and album name
Title	Year	Other artist(s)	Album	Ref.
"Spaghettii"	2024	Beyoncé; Shaboozey	Cowboy Carter	
"The Linda Martell Show"	2024	Beyoncé	Cowboy Carter	

== Awards and nominations ==
Award	Year	Work	Category	Result	Ref.
CMT Music Awards	2021	Herself	Equal Play Award	Won	
Grammy Awards	2025	"Spaghettii" (Beyoncé featuring Linda Martell and Shaboozey)	Best Melodic Rap Performance	Nominated	
Grammy Awards	2025	"Color Him Father"	Grammy Hall of Fame	Inducted	
