= Dance Dance Revolution Universe =

2007 video game

- North American cover art
- Developer: Konami
- Publisher: Konami
- Series: Dance Dance Revolution
- Platform: Xbox 360
- Release: NA: February 27, 2007; EU: December 7, 2007
- Genre: Music
- Modes: Single-player, multiplayer

Dance Dance Revolution Universe (also known as Dancing Stage Universe in Europe) is a music video game. It was released as a part of Dance Dance Revolution franchise by Konami for the Xbox 360. The game was unveiled on May 9, 2006, at the Electronic Entertainment Expo in Los Angeles.

== Gameplay ==
DDR Universe comes bundled with a plastic mat that is meant to be plugged into console while spread out on the floor. Arrows pointing in different directions scroll up the screen, and the players have to perform corresponding steps on the mat. By doing so, points are gained.

Upon the first launch, the game takes the player into Basic Edition, which serves as a tutorial. It consists of How to Play (dancing lessons) and Lesson Mode, a series of 22 tests that teaches every technique in the game. Experienced players can go right to the Master Mode where all the normal game modes are available (quest, party, workout, training, quest, Xbox Live, challenge, edit and jukebox).

The main, Quest mode has the player travelling around the country to compete against the AI while unlocking new songs by earning money, party mode is made of a collection of minigames for up to four players. Also, Challenge Mode gives certain objectives to accomplish for each of the songs, Workout is intended for players to burn off calories, and Edit Mode allows customization of the dance steps for songs and creation of personalized tracks.

The game makes extensive use of Xbox Live, including online play, player ranking, and downloadable song packs via purchase with Microsoft Points. It also features music from Chris Brown, Kylie Minogue, Depeche Mode, and others.

== Music ==
There are over 60 songs, some being available through DLC or by unlocking through Quest mode.

=== Default songs ===
By default, the songs included are:

Song title	Artist	Note
8-bit	Drew Campbell	
All Up In My Face	DJ? Acucrack	
B4U (B4 ZA BEAT MIX)	NAOKI	
Beyond Here and Now (Intensified)	Neuropa	
BRIGHTNESS DARKNESS	SPARKER	
Castlevania (Freestylin' Mix)	WaveGroup feat. Nicky G.	
Close Your Eyes (Activated Mix)	Daybehavior	
Cosmic Hammer	Jondi & Spesh	
Dancefloor Killer	Richard Kayvan	
DIAMOND JEALOUSY	AKIRA YAMAOKA	
Don't Play Nice	Verbalicious	
Everytime We Touch (Radio Mix)	Cascada	
Feels Just Like It Should	Jamiroquai	
GO! (Mahalo Mix)	DM Ashura	
Grandolin	Zerofuser	
Guilt Is a Useless Emotion (Mac Quayle Mix)	New Order	
Gyruss -Full Tilt Mix-	JT.1UP	
Heart With a View (Echo Image Remix)	The Echoing Green	
Horsemen of the Invisible	Secret Chiefs 3	
HOT LIMIT	JOHN DESIRE	
Hydrasound	GEOMANCER	
Ignition	Audio Magnetics	
Indian Summer	Canton	
INFINITE PRAYER	L.E.D.LIGHT feat. GORO	
INSERTiON	NAOKI underground	
KAGEROW (Dragonfly)	Des-ROW·UNITED special+r	
Less 'Yap Yap'	Temporary Lovers	
Loops	Jondi & Spesh feat. J-Bone	
Love Is On Our Side	Frank Popp Ensemble	
Magic Carpet Ride (Steir's Mix)	Philip Steir feat. Steppenwolf	
Nightshade (Diskowarp Easily Amused Mix)	Melody and Mezzo	
Precious (Sasha's Gargantuan Vocal Mix)	Depeche Mode	
PUT YOUR FAITH IN ME(Steve Porter Mix)	UZI-LAY	
Race Against Time	Jeff Steinman	
rain of sorrow	NM feat. EBONY FAY	From DDRMAX2: Dance Dance Revolution 7thMix
Rapper's Delight	Sugar Hill Gang	
roughneck	skylab2000	
Run It!	Chris Brown	
Saturday Night	Ozomatli	
Senses	JT.1UP	
September '99	Earth, Wind & Fire vs. Phats & Small	
SKY HIGH	DJ MIKO	From Dance Dance Revolution Solo 2000
Slam	Pendulum	
Slow (Chemical Brothers Remix)	Kylie Minogue	
Somebody To Love	Boogie Pimps	
SOMETHING WONDERFUL	L.E.D.	
Summer Fantasy	Alien Six	
TEST ROOM -	Plus-Tech Squeeze Box	
The Hop	OR-IF-IS	
There's a Rhythm	Dig Bear	
Tsugaru (OR-IF-IS Mix)	RevenG vs DE-SIRE	
Twist	Goldfrapp	
Vanity Angel	FIXX	
We Are Connected(Overdrive Mix)	Jondi & Spesh	
What Have Her	Chris Fortier	
Wraith	Monolithic	
WWW.BLONDE.GIRL (MOMO MIX)	JENNY ROM	
Youngmen Blues	Round Table	

=== Downloadable songs ===
Mega Pack

Song title	Artist	Note
Broken My Heart (Cusimo & Co. Starlite Remix)	NAOKI Feat. Paula Terry	
Me and My Friends	THE DANDY WARHOLS	
Audiophilosophy	Neverakka	
AM-3P	KTz	from Dance Dance Revolution 2ndMix
ECSTASY	d-complex	from Dance Dance Revolution 5thMix
ON THE JAZZ (Smooth House Mix)	Jonny Dynamite!	from Dance Dance Revolution 5thMix (CS Version)
Beside You	Intuition	
White Hot	R.A.S.T.	
CANDY*	Luv UNLIMITED	from DDRMAX Dance Dance Revolution 6thMix
KISS ME ALL NIGHT LONG	NAOKI J-STYLE feat. MIU	from Dance Maniax 2ndMix

Preceded by the Ultramix series	Dance Dance Revolution Universe; 2007	Succeeded by Dance Dance Revolution Universe 2
