= 12th Annual Grammy Awards =

1970 US music awards ceremony

- Date: March 11, 1970
- Location: Ambassador West Hotel Chicago; Century Plaza Hotel Los Angeles; Municipal Auditorium Nashville; Alice Tully Hall Lincoln Center, New York; American Motor Hotel Atlanta

Television/radio coverage
- Network: ABC

The 12th Annual Grammy Awards were held on March 11, 1970. They recognized accomplishments of musicians for the year 1969. Bill Cosby hosted in Los Angeles, Merv Griffin hosted in New York, Regis Philbin hosted in Chicago, Jack Palance hosted in Nashville, and Ray Stevens and Steve Alaimo in Atlanta.

== Performers ==
- Jack Jones - Games People Play
- The Isley Brothers - It's Your Thing
- Peggy Lee - Is That All There Is?

== Presenters ==
- Sammy Davis Jr. - Introduced Blood, Sweat, and Tears
- Sonny & Cher - Introduced The Isley Brothers
- Bob Newhart - Introduced Johnny Cash

== Award winners ==
Record of the Year

- "Aquarius/Let the Sunshine In" — The 5th Dimension
  - Bones Howe, producer
- “Spinning Wheel” — Blood, Sweat And Tears
  - James William Guercio, producer
- “Love Theme From Romeo And Juliet” — Henry Mancini
  - Joe Reisman, producer
- “Is That All There Is?” — Peggy Lee
  - Jerry Leiber & Mike Stoller, producers
- “A Boy Named Sue” — Johnny Cash
  - Bob Johnston, producer

Album of the Year

- James William Guercio (producer) & Blood, Sweat & Tears for Blood, Sweat & Tears

Song of the Year

- Joe South for "Games People Play"

Best New Artist

- Crosby, Stills & Nash

=== Children's ===
- Best Recording for Children
  - Peter, Paul and Mary for Peter, Paul and Mommy

=== Classical ===
- Best Classical Performance, Orchestra
  - Pierre Boulez (conductor) & the Cleveland Orchestra for Boulez Conducts Debussy, Vol. 2 "Images Pour Orchestre"
- Best Vocal Soloist Performance, Classical
  - Thomas Schippers (conductor), Leontyne Price & the New Philharmonia for Barber: Two Scenes From "Antony and Cleopatra"/Knoxville, Summer of 1915
- Best Opera Recording
  - Otto Gerdes (producer), Herbert von Karajan (conductor), Helga Dernesch, Thomas Stolze, Jess Thomas & the Berlin Philharmonic Orchestra for Wagner: Siegfried
- Best Choral Performance, Classical (other than opera)
  - Luciano Berio (conductor), Ward Swingle (choir director), the Swingle Singers & the New York Philharmonic for Berio: Sinfonia
- Best Classical Performance - Instrumental Soloist or Soloists (with or without orchestra)
  - Wendy Carlos for Switched-On Bach
- Best Chamber Music Performance
  - The Chicago Brass Ensemble, Cleveland Brass Ensemble & Philadelphia Brass Ensemble for Gabrieli: Antiphonal Music of Gabrieli
- Album of the Year, Classical
  - Rachel Elkind (producer) & Wendy Carlos for Switched-On Bach

=== Comedy ===
- Best Comedy Recording
  - Bill Cosby for Bill Cosby, aka Sports

=== Composing and arranging ===
- Best Instrumental Theme
  - John Barry (composer) for Midnight Cowboy
- Best Original Score Written for a Motion Picture or a Television Special
  - Burt Bacharach (composer) for Butch Cassidy and the Sundance Kid
- Best Instrumental Arrangement
  - Henry Mancini (arranger) for "Love Theme from Romeo and Juliet"
- Best Arrangement Accompanying Vocalist(s)
  - Fred Lipsius (arranger) for "Spinning Wheel" performed by Blood, Sweat & Tears

=== Country ===
- Best Country Vocal Performance, Female
  - Tammy Wynette for Stand By Your Man
- Best Country Vocal Performance, Male
  - Johnny Cash for A Boy Named Sue
- Best Country Performance by a Duo or Group
  - Waylon Jennings & the Kimberlys for MacArthur Park
- Best Country Instrumental Performance
  - The Nashville Brass & Danny Davis for The Nashville Brass Featuring Danny Davis Play More Nashville Sounds
- Best Country Song
  - Shel Silverstein (songwriter) for A Boy Named Sue performed by Johnny Cash

=== Folk ===
- Best Folk Performance
  - Joni Mitchell for Clouds

=== Gospel ===
- Best Gospel Performance
  - Porter Wagoner & the Blackwood Brothers for In Gospel Country album
- Best Soul Gospel Performance
  - Edwin Hawkins Singers for "Oh Happy Day" single
- Best Sacred Performance (Non-Classical)
  - Jake Hess for "Ain't That Beautiful Singing" single

=== Jazz ===
- Best Instrumental Jazz Performance, Small Group or Soloist With Small Group
  - Wes Montgomery for Willow Weep for Me
- Best Instrumental Jazz Performance, Large Group or Soloist With Large Group
  - Quincy Jones for Walking in Space

=== Musical show ===
- Best Score From an Original Cast Show Album
  - Burt Bacharach, Hal David (composers), Henry Jerome, Phil Ramone (producers) & the original cast (Jerry Orbach, Jill O'Hara, Edward Winter, Donna McKecknie, A .L. Hines, Marian Mercer & Paul Reed) for Promises, Promises

=== Packaging and notes ===
- Best Album Cover
  - David Stahlberg & Evelyn J. Kelbish (graphic artists) for America the Beautiful performed by Gary McFarland
- Best Album Notes
  - Johnny Cash (notes writer) for Nashville Skyline performed by Bob Dylan

=== Pop ===
- Best Contemporary Vocal Performance, Female
  - Peggy Lee for "Is That All There Is?"
- Best Contemporary Vocal Performance, Male
  - Harry Nilsson for "Everybody's Talkin'"
- Best Contemporary Vocal Performance by a Group
  - The 5th Dimension for "Aquarius/Let the Sunshine In"
- Best Contemporary Performance by a Chorus
  - Percy Faith for "Love Theme From "Romeo and Juliet" performed by the Percy Faith Orchestra & Chorus
- Best Contemporary Instrumental Performance
  - Blood, Sweat & Tears for "Variations on a Theme by Eric Satie"
- Best Contemporary Song
  - Joe South for "Games People Play"

=== Production and engineering ===
- Best Engineered Recording, Non-Classical
  - Geoff E. Emerick & Phil McDonald (engineers) for Abbey Road performed by The Beatles
- Best Engineered Recording, Classical
  - Wendy Carlos (engineer & artist) for Switched-On Bach

=== R&B ===
- Best R&B Vocal Performance, Female
  - Aretha Franklin for "Share Your Love With Me"
- Best R&B Vocal Performance, Male
  - Joe Simon for "The Chokin' Kind"
- Best Rhythm & Blues Performance by a Duo or Group, Vocal or Instrumental
  - Isley Brothers for "It's Your Thing"
- Best R&B Instrumental Performance
  - King Curtis for "Games People Play"
- Best Rhythm & Blues Song
  - Richard Spencer (songwriter) for "Color Him Father" performed by The Winstons

=== Spoken ===
- Best Spoken Word Recording
  - Art Linkletter & Diane Linkletter for We Love You Call Collect
