= Ghost note =

Musical note with a rhythmic value, but no discernible pitch

Illustration of dead note in musical notation and guitar tablature

In music, notably in jazz, a ghost note (or a dead, muted, silenced or false note) is a musical note with a rhythmic value, but no discernible pitch when played. In musical notation, this is represented by a cross "×" for a note head instead of an oval, or parentheses around the note head. It should not be confused with the X-shaped notation that raises a note to a double sharp.

On stringed instruments, this is played by sounding a muted string—"Muted to the point where it is more percussive sounding than obvious and clear in pitch. There is a pitch, to be sure, but its musical value is more rhythmic than melodic or harmonic... they add momentum and drive to any bass line." Occurring in a rhythmic figure, they are purposely deemphasized, often to the point of near silence. In popular music drumming, ghost notes are ones played "very softly between the 'main' notes," (off the beat on the sixteenth notes) most often on the snare drum in a drum kit. Ghost notes are often used by electric bass players and double bass players in a range of popular music and traditional music styles. In vocal music, this style of notation represents words that are spoken in rhythm rather than sung.

== Instrumental music ==
Ghost notes are not simply the unaccented notes in a pattern. The unaccented notes in such a pattern as a clave are considered to represent the mean level of emphasis—they are neither absolutely emphasized nor unemphasized. If one further deemphasizes one of these unaccented notes to the same or a similar extent to which the accented notes in the pattern are emphasized, then one has 'ghosted' that note. In a case in which a ghost note is deemphasized to the point of silence, that note then represents a rhythmic placeholder in much the same way as does a rest. This can be a very fine distinction, and the ability of an instrumentalist to differentiate between what is a ghost note and what is a rest is governed largely by the acoustic nature of the instrument.

Wind instruments, including the human voice, and guitars are examples of instruments generally capable of ghosting notes without making them synonymous with rests, while a pianist or percussionist would have more difficulty in creating this distinction because of the percussive nature of the instruments, which hampers the resolution of the volume gradient as one approaches silence. However, in such a case as that the ghost notes were clearly audible, while being far less prominent than the unaccented notes which represent the mean degree of emphasis within the example, then a percussionist could be said to create what we might define as ghost notes.

A frequent misconception is that grace notes and ghost notes are synonymous. A grace note is by definition decidedly shorter in length than the principal note which it 'graces', but in many examples the grace note receives a greater degree of accentuation (emphasis) than the principal itself, even though it is a much shorter note than the principal. In other words, while a grace note could be ghosted, the ghosting of notes is a function of volume rather than of duration.

=== Percussion ===
Drumming: Ghost notes indicated by parentheses, main notes distinguished by accents

In drumming, a ghost note is played at very low volume, typically on a snare drum. In musical notation, ghost notes are indicated in parentheses surrounding the note. According to The Drummer's Bible: How to Play Every Drum Style from Afro-Cuban to Zydeco, the purpose of a ghost note is to "...be heard under the main sound of the groove. This produces a subtle 16th-note feel around a strong back beat or certain accents."

Examples can be heard in the drumming of Harvey Mason, Mike Clark, Bernard Purdie, Brad Wilk, David Garibaldi, Karen Carpenter, and Chad Smith. Ghost note drumming is a distinguishing feature of R&B music. Particularly recognizable examples of this technique are Gregory C. Coleman's drum break in "Amen, Brother" by The Winstons, Clyde Stubblefield's beat in "Cold Sweat" by James Brown and Jeff Porcaro playing the beat for the Toto hit "Rosanna".

=== Stringed instruments ===
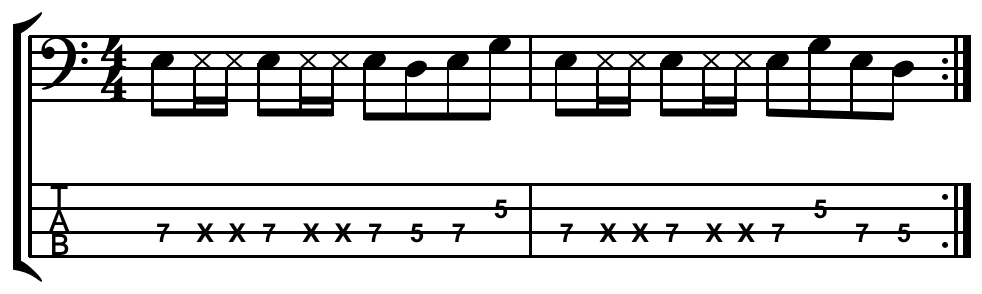
Bass: Ghost notes indicated by ×-shaped note heads.

A guitarist wishing to ghost a note can decrease the pressure the fretting hand is exerting upon the strings without removing the hand from the fretboard (which would result in the sounding of the open pitches of those strings). This is sometimes called a 'scratch', and is considered a ghost note unless all the unaccented notes in the pattern were 'scratched' (in which case the scratches are unaccented notes).

On the double bass and electric bass, as with the guitar, ghost notes can be performed by muting the strings, either with the fretting hand or the plucking/picking hand, which creates notes of indeterminate pitch that have a percussive quality. On the electric bass, ghost notes are widely used in the slap bass style, as a way of creating a percussive, drum-like sound in funk and Latin music. On the double bass, percussive ghost notes are sometimes performed by slapping the strings against the fingerboard, which creates a percussive, "clacky" sound. With the double bass, slap-style ghost notes are used in rockabilly, bluegrass, and traditional blues and swing jazz.

Bassists James Jamerson (of Motown), Carol Kaye (of Motown), Rocco Prestia (for Tower of Power), and Chuck Rainey (for Steely Dan, Aretha Franklin, and others) all include "tons of ghost notes done right" in their playing. The 'ticking' sound in the Pink Floyd song "Time" is an example, played by picking two bass strings, muted high up.

== Vocal music ==
In vocal music, especially in musical theater, a ghost note represents that the lyrics must be spoken rather than sung, retaining the marked rhythm but having indeterminate pitch. Notes with value less than a half note use a cross instead of an oval as a note head. Occasionally a half note or whole note is represented with an open diamond note head, often representing a scream or grunt.

As an extreme example, the opening number of The Music Man, "Rock Island", is written almost exclusively in ghost notes.

This notation may also indicate Sprechstimme or rapping.

== See also ==
- Damping (music)
