= Amen break =

Widely sampled drum break

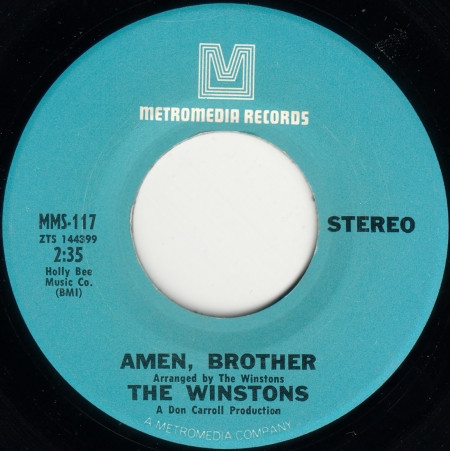
Seven-inch single for "Amen, Brother"

The Amen break is a drum break that has been widely sampled in popular music. It comes from the 1969 instrumental track "Amen, Brother" by the American soul group the Winstons, released as the B-side of the 1969 single "Color Him Father". The drum break lasts seven seconds and was performed by Gregory Coleman.

With the rise of hip-hop in the 1980s, the Amen break was used in hits including "Straight Outta Compton" by N.W.A and "Keep It Going Now" by Rob Base & DJ E-Z Rock. In the 1990s, it became a staple of drum and bass and jungle music. It has been used in thousands of tracks of various genres, making it one of the most sampled recordings in music history.

The Winstons received no royalties for the sample. The bandleader, Richard Lewis Spencer, was not aware of its use until 1996, after the statute of limitations for copyright infringement had passed. He condemned its use as plagiarism, but later said it was flattering. He said it was unlikely that Coleman, who died homeless and destitute in 2006, realized the impact he had made on music. In 2026, "Amen, Brother" was selected by the US Library of Congress for preservation in the National Recording Registry.

== Recording ==
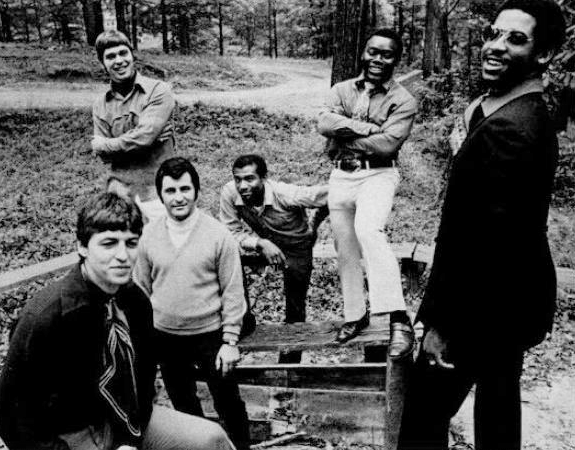
The Winstons in 1969

The Winstons were a soul band from Washington, D.C., who played throughout the southern United States. They were led by Richard Lewis Spencer. In early 1969, the Winstons recorded the single "Color Him Father" in Atlanta. For the B-side, they recorded an instrumental based on the gospel song "Amen" and a guitar riff Curtis Mayfield had played for Spencer. The result was "Amen, Brother", which Spencer said they composed in about 20 minutes. Though "Color Him Father" became a top-10 R&B hit and won a Grammy Award, "Amen, Brother" received little notice. As a mixed-race group, the Winstons struggled to secure bookings and disbanded in 1970.

== Drum break ==
The Amen break
As it originally appears on "Amen, Brother" by the Winstons

At about 1 minute and 26 seconds into "Amen, Brother", the other musicians stop playing and the drummer, Gregory Coleman, performs a four-bar drum break that lasts for seven seconds. For two bars, Coleman plays the previous beat. In the third bar, he delays a snare hit. In the fourth bar, he leaves the first beat empty, then plays a syncopated pattern and an early crash cymbal.

The drum break was added to lengthen the track, which had been too short with just the riff. Spencer said he directed the break, but Phil Tolotta, the only other surviving member of the Winstons in 2015, credited it solely to Coleman.

== Sampling ==
In the 1980s, with the rise of hip-hop, DJs began using turntables to loop drum breaks from records, which MCs would rap over. In 1986, "Amen, Brother" was included on Ultimate Breaks and Beats, a compilation of old funk and soul tracks with clean drum breaks intended for DJs. Salt-N-Pepa's 1986 single "I Desire" was one of the first tracks to sample the Amen break.

In 1988, Mantronix released the influential track "King of the Beats", which edited and processed the Amen break to make it "central to the track rather than simply a rhythmic bedding". The break was used in a number of mainstream tracks that year, including "Straight Outta Compton" by N.W.A and "Keep It Going Now" by Rob Base & DJ E-Z Rock. It was widely sampled in British dance music in the early 1990s, especially in drum and bass and jungle. It has been used in multiple genres, including rock music by acts such as Oasis, in commercials, and television themes such as Futurama.

The Amen break has been in used in thousands of tracks, making it one of the most widely sampled tracks in history. It became popular as it was easy to manipulate and offered a simple way to create jungle music. The English drummer Tom Skinner cited the appealing "crunch" of the recording quality. Producers have manipulated it by altering its pitch or speed, or re-ordering its components to mimic ghost notes or other effects.

== Royalties ==
The copyright owner of "Amen, Brother", including the Amen break, was the Winstons bandleader, Richard Lewis Spencer. Neither he nor Coleman received royalties for the break. Spencer was not aware of its use until an executive contacted him asking for the master tape in 1996, when he was working for the Washington Metro. The journalist Simon Reynolds likened the situation to "the man who goes to the sperm bank and unknowingly sires hundreds of children". Spencer was unable to take legal action, as the statute of limitations for copyright infringement at the time was three years.

Spencer condemned the sampling as plagiarism and said he "felt ripped off and raped". He said in 2011: "[Coleman's] heart and soul went into that drum break. Now these guys copy and paste it and make millions." However, in 2015, he said: "It's not the worst thing that can happen to you. I'm a black man in America and the fact that someone wants to use something I created – that's flattering."

Coleman died homeless and destitute in 2006. Spencer said it was unlikely he was aware of the impact he had made on music. In 2015, a GoFundMe campaign set up for Spencer by the British DJs Martyn Webster and Steve Theobald raised more than £18,000 ($26,000). Spencer died in 2020. In 2026, "Amen, Brother" was selected by the US Library of Congress for preservation in the National Recording Registry for its "cultural, historical or aesthetic importance in the nation's recorded sound heritage".

== See also ==
- Think break
- "Funky Drummer"
- Breakbeat
- Breakcore
