= Dance Dance Revolution DVD Game =

2006 video game

- North American cover art
- Designers: Imagination Entertainment
- Publishers: Imagination Entertainment
- Publication: NA: 2006; EU: September 2007; AU: 2007
- Series: Dance Dance Revolution

Dance Dance Revolution DVD Game is a 2006 DVD-based game in the Dance Dance Revolution series (or DDR series) hosted by Roxee, a member of the Australian children's entertainment property, The Funkees. It is unique from other DDR games for a number of reasons. It was the first DDR game not to be developed by the creators of the original series, Konami. The only other non-Konami-developed DDR game is the Disney Channel Edition. To date it remains the only game neither developed nor published by Konami and, perhaps more significantly, it is the only game in the series which lacks input.

== Gameplay ==
Although several entries in the Plug-n-Play subseries of DDR games (most notably My First Dance Dance Revolution) featured simplified (2-step) or smaller scale dance pads for children, the 2 dance pads which come bundled with Dance Dance Revolution DVD Game are scaled-back to the point where they no longer allow input to the game. The reason for this could be that as a game intended for players of ages 5 and older, younger players could have technical difficulties in gameplay. Instead, the Dance Dance Revolution DVD Game instruction booklet sets up a subjective scoring system where 1-4 players vote on each other's dance moves (style) and adherence to the rhythm.

== Music ==
Dance Dance Revolution DVD Game features 30 unique songs referred to as Dance Sessions. As these songs are played, personal dance instructor Roxee, encourages players to keep up the good work. Roxee is a member of the Australian children's entertainment property, The Funkees.

Dance Sessions featured are listed in the following table:

Songs from Dance Dance Revolution DVD Game
Jamaican Gingerbread
Get Your Groove On
Mini Monsta
Just Let It Go
Starting Over Again
Turn Up Ya Rhythm
Under Construction
Loupe de Loupe
Overclocked Tribute
Eleven-Twenty-Nine

Nitro Scooter
Turn It Up
Commodore '65
Beyond the Silence
Help Me Dr. Dance
The Love Returns
Feel the Music
It's Electrified!
Time to Jam
Short Stop in Paradise

Don't Just Sit There
Dust Off the Vinyl
Where's My Hero?
Red Hat Revival
All You Need to Know
Escape the Energy
Shake Your Body
Put It Together
Superslider
Going Round Again

== Reception ==
Dance Dance Revolution DVD Game was released in 2006 for the North American (NTSC) market and in 2007 for the UK and Australian (PAL) markets. Since its release, sales were lackluster despite earning the National Parenting Center's "Seal of Approval." GameSetWatch's Simon Carless anecdotally suggests that when a player learns that the game mat doesn't have any connection to the DVD player, "a little piece inside of him die[s]." Kotaku's Brian Ashcraft emphatically denounced the product as "not a game." Due to its membership in Konami's Dance Dance Revolution series, however, it has been purchased by collectors and investors speculating on future collectible value.
