= Porterhouse Media =

American multimedia company and advertising agency

PorterHouse Media
- Type: Sole proprietorship
- Industry: Advertising
- Founded: 2009
- Founder: Steve Porter
- Headquarters: Holyoke, Massachusetts, United States
- Area served: Global
- Key people: Eli Wilkie; John LoBello (DJ Hush); Andrew Bousquet (DJ Bons)
- Brands: PH Recordings; Pleasure Hunters
- Services: Video mashups; Video game score
- Number of employees: 8
- Website: porterhousemedia.com

Porterhouse Media is a multimedia company and advertising agency based in Holyoke, Massachusetts. The company was founded in 2009 by Steve Porter, following the success of Porter's autotuned viral video remixes. Previously, Porter had worked as a DJ and producer.

== History ==
Porterhouse Media was founded in 2009 by Steve Porter to create viral video advertisements for other companies. Porter's style of video mashups had been successfully self-published on YouTube, where they gained millions of views.

=== Notable campaigns ===
In 2010, PorterHouse Media partnered with Goodby Silverstein & Partners to produce advertisements for the National Basketball Association's "Where Amazing Happens" campaign. They produced four commercial spots, "Where Defense Happens", "Where Clutch Happens", "Where Determination Happens", and "Where Stepping Up Happens", which each remixed footage of basketball players into rap songs. In the same year, PorterHouse Media also produced a series of advertisements for ESPN's Sunday NFL Countdown and CBC Television's Hockey Night in Canada.

Dutch advertising agency Endemol and PorterHouse Media collaborated in 2015 on a campaign to promote the television show Fear Factor.

== Awards ==
Two of PorterHouse Media's video remixes won Webby Awards: in 2012 for "Best Video Mashup" for the "All He Does Is Win Remix" featuring football player Tim Tebow, and in 2013 for the same award for the "So Disrespectful" remix, which featured Skip Bayless and Stephen A. Smith of First Take. In that year, Porter was also nominated for a Daytime Emmy Award for "Outstanding Promotional Achievement" for PorterHouse Media's collaboration with the ABC network, which included creating "monthly mashups" for the morning news program Good Morning America.

In 2012, Fast Company named Porter one of the "Most Creative People of 2012" for his work through PorterHouse Media.
