= Dance Dance Revolution Dance Wars =

2013 video game

- App logo
- Developer(s): Konami
- Publisher(s): Konami
- Series: Dance Dance Revolution
- Platform(s): iOS
- Release: NA: February 14, 2013
- Genre(s): Music

Dance Dance Revolution Dance Wars, stylized Dance Dance Revolution DANCE WARS and sometimes abbreviated as DDR Dance Wars, is the most recent home release of Dance Dance Revolution, and the third one to be released in iOS. The game stopped functioning at September 1, 2013 due to the team retiring from online.

== Gameplay ==
Dance Dance Revolution Dance Wars retains its core gameplay: matching the hit of arrow according to the song's timing. There are basically two game mode players can choose: Battle Mode and Free Play Mode. The heart of this game is Battle Mode, where players can match against other player or aiding players through Dance Crew system. Players have ability to build Dance Crew by recruiting other people. By having Dance Crew, players may do a Practice Battle and Crew Battle while also aiding or having other Crew member aiding players during battle. Respect Points may be earned through Dance Crew to obtain or upgrade skills and buying items. Dance Dance Revolution Dance Wars implements what is to be called as "Stamina", a representation of the energy used in Battles and Missions. It can be refilled by eating foods or using items that can refill stamina, although Practice Battle and playing songs in Free Play Mode don't affect the Stamina.

=== Unlocks ===
There are several ways to obtain unlockables. Note that these unlockables is not just songs, but also items, accessories for characters and characters themselves.

- Invitation. Inviting certain numbers of people to play Dance Dance Revolution Dance Wars may give players unlockables.
- Missions. Players are required to accomplish various Missions to obtain unlockables. Also, if players have downloaded jukebeat, they may also obtain three songs from jukebeat.
- Crew Battle. Crew Battle is a cooperative battle where players aims for "Stickers", part of a song banner. Player may obtain Stickers through battle and or placing Traps for other rivals. If a set of Stickers are obtained, the song will be unlocked.
- Event. In-game events will give players unlockables.
  - The current Event, Unidentified Funky Objects (announced February 25, 2013), lets players to unlock the song Unidentified Funky Objects, among other unlockables. The event itself is divided into four chapters, with the objective to clear the song Unidentified Funky Objects in a fixed difficulty (Chapter 1 show players the Beginner chart, Chapter 2 the Basic chart, and so on).

== Development ==
In 2012, KONAMI announced their third installment of DDR in iOS system under the name "Dance Dance Revolution GREE", hinting the ability to use GREE in this installment. It was announced to be released in February 2012, but no news were available since then. However, it was announced again on December 14, 2012 that the game would be released under the title "Dance Dance Revolution Dance Wars" and would be the first installment in iOS to make use of GREE system, meaning that it would incorporate online and multiplayer gameplay. It was released on February 14, 2013.

== Music ==
There are currently 53 songs in Dance Dance Revolution Dance Wars, including the a-ha pack that is released at the same time as the release of the game.

Song	Artist	Tier
a-ha Pack
Take On Me	a-ha	
Train of Thought	a-ha	
You Are The One	a-ha	
Miley Cyrus Pack
7 Things I Hate About You	Miley Cyrus	
The Climb	Miley Cyrus	
When I Look At You	Miley Cyrus	
Default Songs
Dense Forest Battle		From Contra; Also available on jukebeat
Kind Lady	OKUYATOS	From DDRMAX -Dance Dance Revolution 6th Mix- (PS2)
My Only Shining Star	NAOKI feat.Becky Lucinda	From Dance Dance Revolution SuperNova
real-high-SPEED	Makoto feat.SK	From Dance Dance Revolution X (PS2)
General Unlocks
A thing called LOVE	D-Crew 2 US	From Dance Dance Revolution SuperNova 2
aftershock!!	DM Ashura	From Dance Dance Revolution UNIVERSE3
All My Love	kors k feat.ЯIRE	From Dance Dance Revolution X2
AM-3P	kTZ	From Dance Dance Revolution 2nd Mix
Anti-Matter	Orbit1 feat.Milo	From Dance Dance Revolution X2
CHAOS	DE-SIRE retunes	From Dance Dance Revolution Supernova
DYNAMITE RAVE	NAOKI	From Dance Dance Revolution 3rd Mix
Electrified	SySF.	From Dance Dance Revolution SuperNova 2
GRADIUSIC CYBER (AMD G5 MIX)	BIG-O feat.TAKA	From Dance Dance Revolution 3rd Mix
Heatstroke	TAG feat.Angie Lee	From Dance Dance Revolution X2 and Dance Dance Revolution HOTTEST PARTY 3
HIGHER	NM feat.SUNNY	From Dance Dance Revolution 4th Mix
HYPER EUROBEAT	NAOKI feat.DDR ALL STARS	From Dance Dance Revolution EXTREME
KISS KISS KISS	NAOKI feat.SHANTI	From Dance ManiaX
L'amour et la liberte (Darwin & DJ Silver Mix)	NAOKI in the MERCURE	From Dance Dance Revolution Supernova 2
LOVE THIS FEELIN'	Chang Ma	From Dance Dance Revolution 2nd Mix
MAX 300	Ω	From DDRMAX -Dance Dance Revolution 6th Mix-
Music in the Rhythm	nc ft. 触電	From Dance Dance Revolution Supernova 2
NGO	鍋島圭一	From Dance Dance Revolution Supernova 2
oarfish	kors k	From Dance Dance Revolution UNIVERSE3
PARANOiA ~Respect~	.3k	From Dance Dance Revolution Party Collection (PS2)
POSSESSION	TAG underground	From Dance Dance Revolution X2
SABER WING	TAG	From Dance Dance Revolution X
sakura storm	Ryu☆	From Dance Dance Revolution UNIVERSE3
SEDUCTION	nc feat.FINALFORCE	From Dance Dance Revolution EXTREME2 (PS2)
Shine	Tomosuke feat.Adreana	From Dance Dance Revolution X2 and Dance Dance Revolution HOTTEST PARTY 3
Your Angel	DM Ashura feat.kors k	From Dance Dance UNIVERSE3
Invitation Unlocks
Uranus	Tatsh SN2 Style	From Dance Dance Revolution Supernova 2
Mission Unlocks
AFRONOVA	RE-VENGE	From Dance Dance Revolution 3rd Mix
A Stupid Barber	Sho-T	From Dance Dance Revolution EXTREME (PS2)
CG Project	Latenighters	From Dance Dance Revolution X2
Dance Dance Revolution	DDR ALL STARS	From Dance Dance Revolution EXTREME
Decade	kors k Vs.dj TAKA	From Dance Dance Revolution X2
dirty digital	kors k	From Dance Dance Revolution UNIVERSE3
D2R	NAOKI	From DDRMAX2 -Dance Dance Revolution 7th Mix-
Feelings Won't Fade (Extend Trance Mix)	SySF.	From Dance Dance Revolution Supernova (PS2)
in love wit you	Kotaro feat.Aya	From Dance Dance Revolution X (PS2)
KISS KISS KISS 秋葉工房 MIX (KISS KISS KISS Akiba Koubou Mix)	Remixed by DJ Command	From Dance Dance Revolution X2
PARANOiA	180	From Dance Dance Revolution
PASSION OF LOVE	NAOKI feat.PAULA TERRY	From Dance Dance Revolution EXTREME2 (PS2)
Poseidon (kors k mix)	NAOKI underground	From Dance Dance Revolution X2
Silver Platform -I wanna get your heart-	U1 Reincarnates w/ Leah	From Dance Dance Revolution Supernova (PS2)
STILL IN MY HEART	NAOKI	From beatmaniaIIDX 5th Style; Also on Dance Dance Revolution 5th Mix
TEARS	NAOKI underground feat.EK	From Dance Dance Revolution EXTREME
You Are A Star	NAOKI feat.Anna Kaelin	From Dance Dance Revolution X2 and Dance Revolution HOTTEST PARTY 3
jukebeat Unlocks
Frogger		From Frogger
LETHAL ENFORCERS Medley		From Lethal Enforcers
Unidentified Funky Objects Event Unlocks
Unidentified Funky Objects	yutak	
