= Dance Dance Revolution Universe 2 =

2007 video game

- North American cover art
- Developer: Hudson Soft
- Publisher: Konami
- Series: Dance Dance Revolution
- Platform: Xbox 360
- Release: NA: December 4, 2007; NA: January 18, 2008 (Game only); EU: November 18, 2008
- Genres: Music, Exercise
- Modes: Single-player, Multiplayer

Dance Dance Revolution Universe 2, sometimes abbreviated as Universe 2, is a music video game for the North American Xbox 360. Published by Konami and developed by Hudson Soft on December 4, 2007, Universe 2 is a sequel to Dance Dance Revolution Universe released earlier the same year. Universe 2 features a large soundtrack with songs ranging from the 1970s to today, new modes of gameplay designed for newcomers including Freestyle Mode which allows players to dance without needing to step on any arrows, Quest Mode where players build a dancing character and travel from location to location in a virtual world facing off against other dancers, and downloadable content through the Xbox Live service. The game was released in Europe with a different set of songs as Dancing Stage Universe 2.

== Downloadable Song Pack ==
Universe 2 Megapack:

- BATTLE BREAKS - DJ TAKAWO
- Catch it! - TOTAL SCIENCE
- DYNAMITE RAVE - NAOKI
- GRADIUSIC CYBER - TAKA
- Himawari - Riyu from BeForU
- jelly kiss - Togo Project feat. Sana
- Love This Feelin' (ZONK Remix) - Akira Yamaoka
- Moment 40 - Moshic
- Put Your Faith In Me (Saturday Night Mix) - UZI-LAY
- Toe Jam - Big Idea

== Music ==
Songs with a padlock next to them have to be unlocked after certain conditions are met in the game.

Dance Dance Revolution Universe 2 soundtrack
No.	Song	Artist
1	"Apache"	The Incredible Bongo Band
2	"Dorset Perception"	Shpongle
3	"Fire"	Ferry Corsten
4	"He's the Greatest Dancer"	Sister Sledge
5	"I Know You Got Soul"	Jason Nevins vs. Eric B. & Rakim
6	"Is It Any Wonder? (Tall Paul Mix)"	Keane
7	"Jungle Boogie"	Kool & the Gang
8	"Love Don't Let Me Go"	David Guetta vs. The Egg
9	"Rockit"	Herbie Hancock
10	"Safety Dance"	Men Without Hats
11	"So Fine"	The Freestylers
12	"Take Me Out"	Franz Ferdinand
13	"The Way You Move (Full Phatt Remix)"	Outkast
14	"Walk Like an Egyptian"	The Bangles
15	"Always"	Amon Tobin
16	"Anytime Soon"	Blu Mar Ten
17	"Don't You Love Me"	Andy Caldwell
18	"Hey!"	Tipsy
19	"I Wish I Could Be Beautiful"	Rithma
20	"Love in Motion"	Alien Six
21	"Not Me (Extended Mix)"	Sarah Taylor
22	"Steppin' Out"	Kaskade
23	"Sunshine in London"	The Sunchasers feat. Victoria Pope
24	"The Tide"	Noisia
25	"Anthema"	oo39.com
26	"Arrivals and Departures"	Linus!
27	"Breathing More"	Larissa Lam
28	"Contract (Breach Mix)"	Rupesh Cartel
29	"Do It Right"	AFD feat. Ashley
30	"Eternus"	Sanxion7
31	"Get Up! Give Up! Move On!"	The Divys
32	"Handle Your Business"	Starla Marie feat. Coco J
33	"In Different Things (USA Club Mix)"	ReName
34	"I Wanna Be Your Star (Speedy Mix)"	Melody & Mezzo
35	"Make Me Cry (Drew Campbell Remix)"	Binghi Ghost feat. Turbulence
36	"Moving Higher"	Contour
37	"Musika Atomika"	Syrian
38	"Orange Sky"	Arctures
39	"Ragganinja"	Greg Packer & Assassin
40	"Rock the Show"	Future Prophecy
41	"Space Space Shooter (Cusimo & Co. Remix)"	Kick & Punch
42	"Summer Girl"	Neverakka
43	"Synergy"	C-14
44	"Tacticle"	Drew Campbell
45	"Until Forever"	Beatdrop
46	"Yoru Funk"	oo39.com
47	"Akiba Drift"	Ko Kimura
48	"Better Than Before"	Drew Campbell
49	"Breath the Air"	Bill Hamel with Spacebar
50	"Contra (Medley Mix)"	Nekojira
51	"Electrified"	SySF.
52	"Elfadiciell"	oo39.com
53	"Emi's Song"	Blu Mar Ten
54	"Entry of the Gladiators (Kaz Mix)"	Julius Fucik
55	"Higher Ground"	Togo Project feat. Chiyo Tia
56	"Lily Funk"	Konception
57	"Mochi Crunch"	Nekojira
58	"On Voit la Mer"	Togo Project feat. Tomoko Kataoka
59	"Rhythm is Rhythm"	oo39.com
60	"Somebody in da House"	Steve Porter
61	"Unborn"	Gein
62	"Cosmic Cowgirl"	Toshio Sakurai
63	"Dead End"	N&S
64	"Disable the Flaw"	D-Crew
65	"Let the Beat Hit 'Em (Classic R&B Style)"	Stone Bros.
66	"Matsuri (J-Summer Mix)"	Re-Venge
67	"Nemesis"	DJ Setup
68	"Potpourri D'orange"	Orange Lounge
69	"Senses"	JT.1Up
70	"Spin the Disc"	Good-Cool
71	"What is Love?"	Tomosuke

Dancing Stage Universe 2 soundtrack
Song	Artist
"Atlantis to Interzone"	Klaxons
"Galang"	M.I.A.
"Here It Goes Again"	OK Go
"Ooh La La"	Goldfrapp
"Young Folks"	Peter, Bjorn and John
"It's The Beat"	Simian Mobile Disco
"Noise Won't Stop"	Shy Child
"You Gonna Want Me"	Tiga
"Chicken Payback"	The Bees
"Heartbeats"	The Knife
"Golden Dawn"	South Central

Preceded by Dance Dance Revolution Universe	Dance Dance Revolution Universe 2; 2007	Succeeded by Dance Dance Revolution Universe 3
