= Dancing Stage EuroMix =

2000 video game

- Developer: Konami
- Publisher: Konami
- Series: Dancing Stage
- Platforms: Arcade, PlayStation
- Release: Arcade: EU: August 2000; NA: October 2000; PlayStation: EU: June 1, 2001
- Genres: Music, Exercise
- Modes: Single player, Multiplayer

Dancing Stage EuroMix is a music video game, developed by Konami, released to European arcades in August 2000. In North America, the game was released as Dance Dance Revolution USA in October 2000. Dancing Stage EuroMix was also released for the PlayStation on June 1, 2001.

== Gameplay ==
The core gameplay involves the player stepping their feet to correspond with the arrows that appear on screen and the beat. During normal gameplay, arrows scroll upwards from the bottom of the screen and pass over a set of stationary arrows near the top (referred to as the "guide arrows" or "receptors", officially known as the Step Zone). When the scrolling arrows overlap the stationary ones, the player must step on the corresponding arrows on the dance platform, and the player is given a judgement for their accuracy of every streaked note.

== Music ==
International variants include Dancing Stage EuroMix and Dance Dance Revolution USA. EuroMix was released in European arcades in August 2000. It has a reduced song list of 28 songs, or 34 songs with the Internet Ranking feature enabled. half which are Konami Originals and half which are licenses. Of the licenses, eight are from Universal Music Group and are only available in this arcade release. Six Konami Originals can be added by activating Internet Ranking, for a total of 34 songs. USA was released in North American arcades in October 2000. It has a reduced song list of 26 songs: six licenses and 20 Konami Originals. EuroMix with Internet Ranking and USA share four licenses and 15 Konami Originals in common, including two 3rdMix Plus tracks: "Love This Feelin'" and "TRIP MACHINE ～luv mix～".

The arcade release of Dancing Stage EuroMix features a total of 34 songs, including 18 licensed songs and 16 Konami original songs. Six of the original songs require the Internet Ranking feature to be enabled, which can be done with a code by an arcade operator. Among the licenses, eight are from Universal Music Group, and this is the only appearance of these songs in a Konami arcade game. The ten other licenses are from Dancemania, which made their arcade debut in the Dance Dance Revolution series. "Dam Dariram" and "Do It All Night" also appear in StepManiaX by Step Revolution.

The PlayStation release of Dancing Stage EuroMix features a total of 24 songs. The ten Dancemania licenses and five of the Internet Ranking songs are unavailable, with five other Konami original songs taking their place. "Let The Move" is the sole Internet Ranking song to return on the PlayStation game, and it is available without an unlock code.

Dancing Stage EuroMix 2 and Dancing Stage SuperNova for arcades feature the 16 original songs from EuroMix without the need for an unlock code.

Song	Artist	Note
Universal Music licenses (arcade and console versions)
"(Mucho Mambo) Sway"	Shaft	
"I Will Survive"	Gloria Gaynor	from the album Love Tracks
"Magic Alec Presents Resonance"	Magic Alec	
"More Than This '99"	Emmie	
"Rushing"	Loni Clark	
"So Good"	Boyzone	from the album Said and Done
"Video Killed The Radio Star"	The Buggles	from the album The Age of Plastic
"Word Up"	Cameo	from the album of the same name
Dancemania licenses (arcade only)
"CAPTAIN JACK (GRANDALE REMIX)"	CAPTAIN JACK	from Dancemania SPEED 2
"DAM DARIRAM"	JOGA	from Dancemania X3
"DO IT ALL NIGHT"	E-ROTIC	from Dancemania X4
"DUB-I-DUB"	ME&MY	from Dancemania 1
"EL RITMO TROPICAL"	DIXIE'S GANG	from Dancemania SUMMERS 2
"HOLIDAY"	WHO'S THAT GIRL!	from ZIPmania II
"KUNG FU FIGHTING"	BUS STOP featuring CARL DOUGLAS	from Dancemania EXTRA
"SO MANY MEN"	ME & MY	from ZIPmania II
"Stomp to my beat"	JS16	from Dancemania WINTERS
"TUBTHUMPING"	CHUMBAWAMBA	from Dancemania EXTRA
Konami Original songs (arcade and console versions)
"AFRONOVA"	RE-VENGE	from Dance Dance Revolution 3rdMix
"DEAD END"	N&S	from Dance Dance Revolution 3rdMix
"DYNAMITE RAVE"	NAOKI	from Dance Dance Revolution 3rdMix
"END OF THE CENTURY"	NO.9	from Dance Dance Revolution 3rdMix
"KEEP ON MOVIN'"	N.M.R	from Dance Dance Revolution 2ndMix
"La Senorita"	CAPTAIN.T	from Dance Dance Revolution 3rdMix
"LUV TO ME (AMD MIX)"	DJ KAZU feat. tiger YAMATO	from Dance Dance Revolution 3rdMix
"MAKE A JAM!"	U1	from Dance Dance Revolution (JP PS)
"PARANOiA Rebirth"	190'	from Dance Dance Revolution 3rdMix
"Silent Hill"	THOMAS HOWARD	from Dance Dance Revolution 3rdMix
Internet Ranking songs
"20, NOVEMBER (D.D.R. VERSION)"	N.M.R feat. DJ nagureo	from Dance Dance Revolution 2ndMix
"Jam Jam Reggae (AMD SWING MIX)"	RICE.C feat. jam master '73	from Dance Dance Revolution 3rdMix
"LET THEM MOVE"	N.M.R	from Dance Dance Revolution 2ndMix
"LOVE THIS FEELIN'"	Chang Ma	from Dance Dance Revolution 2ndRemix (JP PS)
"PARANOiA KCET (clean mix)"	2MB	from Dance Dance Revolution (JP PS)
"TRIP MACHINE (luv mix)"	2MB	from Dance Dance Revolution 2ndRemix (JP PS)
Konami Original songs (console only)
"BRILLIANT 2U"	NAOKI	from Dance Dance Revolution 2ndMix
"MAKE IT BETTER"	mitsu-O!	from Dance Dance Revolution
"PARANOiA"	180	from Dance Dance Revolution
"PUT YOUR FAITH IN ME"	UZI-LAY	from Dance Dance Revolution 2ndMix
"TRIP MACHINE"	DE-SIRE	from Dance Dance Revolution

== Reception ==
Reception
Dancing Stage EuroMix for PlayStation

Review scores
Publication	Score
Computer and Video Games	4/5
M! Games	84%
PlayStation 2 Official Magazine – UK	6/10
JeuxVideos.com	15/20
The Sydney Morning Herald	2.5/5

The PlayStation release of Dancing Stage EuroMix received mixed reviews. The PlayStation 2 Official Magazine – UK gave it a 6 out of 10, stating: "The theory is sound, but are our wallets big enough? Probably not." In Australia, The Sydney Morning Herald gave it a score of 2.5 out of 5, stating that it's "just not as much fun at home […] the dance mat is pretty flimsy. The selection of music is also questionable."

== See also ==
- Dancing Stage
- Dance Dance Revolution

Preceded by Dancing Stage	Dancing Stage Euromix; 2000	Succeeded by Dancing Stage EuroMix 2
