= Steve Porter (producer) =

American music video producer, remixer, and DJ

- Born: Stephen Porter
- Origin: Amherst, Massachusetts
- Genres: Mashup, progressive house, EDM
- Occupation: Disc jockey
- Years active: 1999–present
- Labels: Porterhouse Media; PH Recordings
- Website: http://djsteveporter.com

Steve Porter (born c. 1978) is an American music video producer, remixer and DJ originally from Amherst, Massachusetts. He is best known for his pop-culture mashup remixes and studio work as a progressive house producer.

Porter began producing music while attending Williston Northampton School, and was discovered by Chris Fortier in 1999, when he was signed to Fortier's Fade Records. Since that time, he has toured as a DJ and has released remixes and original music. In 2009, Porter placed second in the DJ Times "America's Best DJ" poll. In the same year, Porter founded Porterhouse Media, an audio/visual marketing company that creates viral videos. Porter has won several awards for his videos, including two Webby Awards and one Daytime Emmy Award nomination.

== Early life ==
Steve Porter was born in Amherst, Massachusetts, around 1978, the son of Catharine and Roger S. Porter. Catherine was an ombudsman at the University of Massachusetts Amherst, and Roger founded the school's polymer science and engineering department.

Porter was interested in sports from a young age, in part because of the NHLPA Hockey '93 video game for the Sega Genesis. He attended Williston Northampton School, where he was part of a club for "budding DJs". He graduated from the school in the 1990s.

== Career ==
As a DJ, Porter was discovered by Chris Fortier and signed to his label, Fade Records. Throughout the early 2000s, Porter toured North America, Asia, and Europe as a DJ. His touring included festivals such as Lollapalooza and Coachella. During this time, he released several progressive house albums, which received mixed to positive reviews from critics. In 2009, he ranked number 2 in the DJ Times "America's Best DJ" poll.

=== Early remixes ===
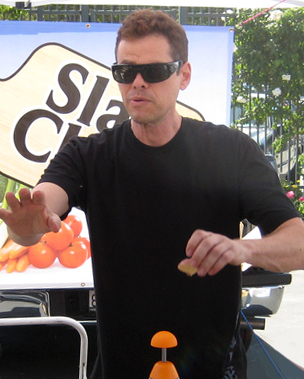
Porter partnered with Vince Offer following the success of the "Rap Chop" remix.

Interested in branching out from traditional DJing, Porter began working on video remixes of commercials and celebrities. One of these remixes was a music video called "Rap Chop", which remixed the Slap Chop infomercial using auto-tuning. Porter posted it to YouTube on April 25, 2009, and soon afterward the video went viral, garnering over 12 million views within two years. A Guardian article compared the video to the similar Cillit Bang remix, while Jason Lutz, in an article written for Billboard, compared Porter's mashup to similar viral video works by Mike Relm and The Gregory Brothers.

In June, Porter released another remix entitled "Press Hop", which featured footage of basketball player Allen Iverson and his "practice" press conference, as well as a controversial rant by American football coach Mike Gundy. The "Press Hop" video was viewed over 3 million times.

In July 2009, because of the success of the "Rap Chop" video, Porter partnered with Vince Offer to produce official commercials for Offer's products. Porter was also contracted by FedEx, and the "Press Hop" remix aired on ESPN. The "Press Hop" remix also helped Porter gain attention from other sports associations.

=== PorterHouse Media ===
Because of the success of his early remixes, Porter founded a production company, PorterHouse Media, in 2009. Porterhouse Media is a multi-media company based in Holyoke, Massachusetts. The company's main service is creating viral media remixes as advertisements for sports teams and leagues and television networks such as ESPN, ABC, and NBC. By 2012, the company had produced approximately 100 video remixes, each of which takes between 100 and 250 hours to create. Most of them are about 30 seconds long.

In 2010, PorterHouse Media partnered with Goodby Silverstein & Partners to produce advertisements for the National Basketball Association's "Where Amazing Happens" campaign. They produced four commercial spots, "Where Defense Happens", "Where Clutch Happens", "Where Determination Happens", and "Where Stepping Up Happens", which each remixed footage of basketball players into rap songs. In the same year, PorterHouse Media also produced a series of advertisements for ESPN's Sunday NFL Countdown and CBC Television's Hockey Night in Canada. Although Porter's remixes are generally well received, fans of his early work as a DJ are often critical of his commercial work.

=== Other work ===
Porter's remix of "Put Your Faith In Me" by Konami in-house artist UZI-LAY appeared in Dance Dance Revolution Universe and his own song "Somebody In Da' House" appeared in Dance Dance Revolution Universe 2. Porter contributed two remixes to the 2014 video game Fantasia: Music Evolved. In 2015, he created a musical "supercut" of clips of the rapper Eminem, to celebrate the artist's birthday. The video was featured in Rolling Stone. This led to a series of subsequent collaborations with the magazine.

Porter also did a mashup of Jeff Dunham's NBC-special Unhinged in Hollywood.

== Awards and recognition ==
Year	Work	Category	Award	Result
2006	DJ	DJ	Top 100 DJs, DJ Magazine	
2009	DJ	DJ	America's Best DJ, DJ Times	
2011	Press Hop 2	Video Remixes/Mashups	Webby Award	Nominated
2012		Most Creative People	Ranked number 60 on Fast Company's list	
2012	All He Does Is Win (Remix)	Best Video Mashup	Webby Award	Won
2013	So Disrespectful (Remix)	Best Video Mashup	Webby Award	Won
2013	Mashups for Good Morning America, ABC	Outstanding Promotional Achievement	Daytime Emmy Award	Nominated
2013	Team USA Tribute	Video- Best Editing	Webby Award	Honoree

== Discography ==
=== Albums ===
- Homegrown (2005)
- Planet P (with Funk Harmony Park) (2005)
- Porterhouse (2006)
- Porterhouse Volume 2 (2007)
- Essential Mix (2007)

=== EPs ===
- Carismo (2006) - Curvve
- Operation Berlin (2006)
- The Control (2009)
- Rollerblade Disco (2009) - Curvve
