= Digital Witchcraft =

American electronic music duo

Digital Witchcraft is a duo of electronic music producers Ned Shepard and Marcus Bacalis. Shepard and Bacalis met in 2000 in Orlando, Florida where they were both attending recording school. For their single, "Fingerpaint", Proton Music held a remix contest judged by Digital Witchcraft. The winner was the duo R&M with the runner up being the artist Opencloud. Both of their remixes were released as b-sides for the "Fingerpaint" single on Proton.
