= Richard Lewis Spencer =

American singer, musician, teacher (1942–2020)

Richard Lewis Spencer (May 3, 1942 – December 27, 2020) was an American funk and soul singer, musician, and teacher. He played tenor saxophone in Otis Redding's band, behind Curtis Mayfield and the Impressions with the Winstons. He was awarded the Grammy Award (R&B Songwriter of the Year 1969) for his composition "Color Him Father". Spencer wrote "Color Him Father" and sang the mega-hit with the Winstons on Metromedia Records. He also led the band during the period during which its drummer, Gregory Coleman, composed and performed the Amen break, the most sampled drum break in music history.

== Early life ==
Spencer was a Wadesboro, North Carolina native who, at the ages of 11 and 12, studied classical piano at the famed Beckwith Piano School in Charlotte, North Carolina. At the age of 13, he became the organist and pianist for the late Bishop J.H. Sherman of The Church of God in Christ.

== Music career ==
In 1962, Spencer moved to Washington, D.C., where he worked with various bar bands including recording with Leroy Taylor and the 4k's as one of the first acts to sign with historic Shrine Records.

In 1969, Spencer was bandleader for the Winstons, an R&B group from Washington, D.C., whose song "Color Him Father" became a hit. The recording reached No. 4 on the Billboard Hot 100 and No. 1 on the Billboard R&B chart. For the B-side, the Winstons recorded "Amen, Brother", an instrumental interpretation of the gospel standard "Amen". The drum break in the song has become widely known as the Amen break, and has been called "the most sampled song of all time".

Spencer never received royalties for use of the "Amen break" and condemned its sampling as plagiarism. However, in 2015, he said: "It's not the worst thing that can happen to you. I'm a black man in America and the fact that someone wants to use something I created - that's flattering." He nevertheless condemned the way the plagiarism had helped to leave Gregory Coleman, the drummer and original composer of the break, homeless and destitute, leading to Coleman's death on the streets in 2006. In 2015, a GoFundMe campaign set up by British DJ Steve Theobald raised £24,000 (US$37,000) to compensate Spencer for the lack of royalties.

Spencer left the music business in 1970. He returned to college to study at the University of the District of Columbia where he received a B.A. in political science and a M.S. in labor management relations. He studied for a M.Ed. at the University of Phoenix and the University of North Carolina, and completed the course work for a Ph.D. at Howard University. Spencer retired from the Washington Metro system in 2000, and became a licensed Baptist Minister and high school teacher in Montgomery County, Maryland. In March 2015, Spencer was selected and received the prestigious "North Carolina Music Hall of Fame" and "DC Legendary Musicians Award".

== Writing ==
Spencer published his first novel, The Molasses Tree: A Southern Love Story, in 2003 (Lulu).

== Personal life ==
Spencer was separated from Angela Boatright, who co-authored The Heir (Xlibris). He had one son, Richard L. Spencer III.

== Death ==
Spencer died on December 27, 2020, at the age of 78.
