= Color Him Father =

1969 single by the Winstons

Single by The Winstons

from the album Color Him Father
- B-side: "Amen, Brother"
- Released: May 1969
- Genre: R&B; soul; funk
- Length: 3:06
- Label: Metromedia
- Songwriter: Richard Lewis Spencer
- Producer: Don Carroll

The Winstons singles chronology
"Color Him Father" (1969)	"Love of the Common People" (1969)

"Color Him Father" is a song written by Richard Lewis Spencer and recorded by American rhythm and blues group the Winstons. It was released in 1969 as their debut single for Metromedia and was a No. 7 hit on the Billboard Hot 100 that year, representing the Winstons' highest entry there. A cover by American singer Linda Martell on Plantation Records also charted in the same year, reaching No. 22 on the Hot Country Songs chart. In 2025, the cover version by Martell was inducted into the Grammy Hall of Fame.

== Background and content ==
"Color Him Father" is a song about a boy expressing his love for his stepfather. The stepdad is portrayed as a hardworking and loving gentleman who married the narrator's widowed mom, who had seven children, and embraced them as his own after her first husband was "killed in the war". ("She said she thought that she could never love again/And then there he stood with that big, wide grin.") The song's lyrics resonated strongly with the public in 1969, the height of the Vietnam War. The word "color", in the song, means "designate" and follows the 'color' motif set in Barbra Streisand's 1963 release of "My Coloring Book." The song served as a major musical inspiration for the 2016 track "Celebrate" by Anderson .Paak.

=== B-side ===
The B-side to "Color Him Father" is "Amen, Brother", an instrumental interpretation of the gospel standard "Amen". The Winstons recorded it in early 1969 in Atlanta, Georgia. With the rise of hip hop in the 1980s, the break was widely sampled and additionally became a staple of drum and bass and jungle. It has been used on thousands of tracks of many genres, making it one of the most sampled recordings of all time.

== Release and chart performance ==
It was released in May 1969, and reached No. 2 on the R&B charts and No. 7 on the Billboard Hot 100 that same year. Its composer, Richard Lewis Spencer, won a Grammy Award for Best R&B song in 1970.

== Track listing ==
7" vinyl single

- "Color Him Father" – 3:06
- "Amen, Brother" – 2:35

== Charts ==
=== Weekly charts ===
Chart (1969)	Peak position
Australian Top Singles (Kent Music Report)	80
US Hot 100 (Billboard)	7
US Best Selling Rhythm & Blues Singles (Billboard)	2

== Cover versions ==
"Color Him Father" has been notably covered multiple times by performers of various musical styles. Lorene Mann released "Color Him Father" on her 1969 RCA album A Mann Called Lorene. O C Smith released it on his 1969 Columbia album O.C. Smith at Home. Bobby Womack recorded the song for his 1994 album Resurrection. Keb' Mo' included it on his 2001 album Big Wide Grin.

=== Linda Martell version ===
"Color Him Father"

Single by Linda Martell

from the album Color Me Country
- B-side: "I Almost Called Your Name"
- Released: July 1969
- Studio: Singleton Sound Studios
- Genre: Country; country pop
- Length: 2:20
- Label: Plantation
- Songwriter: Richard Lewis Spencer
- Producer: Shelby Singleton

Linda Martell singles chronology
"Lonely Hours" (1964)	"Color Him Father" (1969)	"Before the Next Teardrop Falls" (1969)

==== Background and recording ====
In late 1969, "Color Him Father" was notably covered for the country market by Linda Martell. Martell was among country music's first black artists and the first black woman to perform at the Grand Ole Opry. In May 1969 she signed with Shelby Singleton's Plantation label in Nashville, Tennessee. It was soon after her signing that Martell made her first recording sessions in summer 1969. The Winstons' version of "Color Him Father" was brought to Martell's attention through Singleton.

The session was produced entirely by Singleton at "Singleton Sound Studios," located in Nashville. Additional tracks were cut at the same session that would later appear on her 1970 album. The song was cut twice in the studio. In the first take, Singleton found that Martell did not put enough of her own individuality on the record. "I don’t want to hear the Winstons. I want to hear you," he told her.

==== Release and reception ====
"Color Him Father" was released several days after its recording. The single of the track was released via the Plantation label in July 1969. It was the debut single of Martell's country music career. The song spent a total of ten weeks on the Billboard Hot Country Songs chart, peaking at number 22 in September 1969. The single became Martell's highest-peaking track on the Country Songs chart. Her next single release would be her last to reach the country top 40. It also peaked at a similar #23 on the country singles chart by Billboard's competitor Cashbox. "Color Him Father" was later released on Martell's 1970 studio album, Color Me Country.

Martell's version of "Color Him Father" has since received positive reviews since its original release. In his review of Color Me Country, Mark Deming of Allmusic praised her "rich, smooth voice" on the track, also commenting that it " fares well in a subtle C&W arrangement fortified with pedal steel." Oxford American also praised the song. Reviewer Alice Randall explained how the word "color" in the lyric held a special meaning in Martell's interpretation of the song: "Linda Martell effectively directs, not pleads, not suggests, directs us to understand that stepfather's fundamental identity is as father, not his skin color."

In 2024, Rolling Stone ranked Martell's rendition at #86 on its 200 Greatest Country Songs of All Time ranking.

==== Track listing ====
7" vinyl single

- "Color Him Father" – 2:20
- "I Almost Called Your Name" – 2:06

==== Weekly charts ====
Chart (1969)	Peak position
US Hot Country Songs (Billboard)	22
US Cash Box Country Singles	23
