= Jondi & Spesh =

American dance music duo

Jondi & Spesh is an American dance music production and DJ duo, based in San Francisco and composed of J.D. Moyer (Jondi) and Stephen Kay (Spesh).

They have founded their own record label, Loöq Records, and are the hosts of Qoöl, a weekly progressive dance music "happy hour" in San Francisco.

Jondi & Spesh have contributed several songs to the DDR Ultramix and Universe series for the Xbox., Their "Super-Max-Me" mix of the popular DDR song "Max 300" can be found on arcade versions.

== Discography ==
=== Albums ===
- 1998 – Tubedrivers
- 2000 – We are Connected
- 2004 – The Answer
