= The Winstons =

American funk and soul group

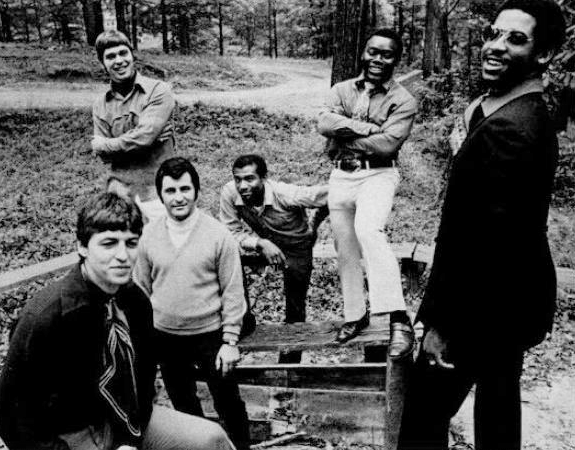
- The Winstons in 1969

Background information
- Origin: Washington, D.C., U.S.
- Genres: Funk, soul
- Label: Metromedia
- Past members: Richard Lewis Spencer; Gregory C. Coleman; Phil Tolotta; Quincy Mattison; Ray Maritano; Sonny Peckrol

The Winstons were an American funk and soul music group based in Washington, D.C. They are known for their 1969 recording featuring a song entitled "Color Him Father" on the A-side, and "Amen, Brother" on the B-side. Halfway into "Amen, Brother", there is a drum solo (performed by Gregory C. Coleman) which would cause the release to become the most widely sampled record in the history of electronic music. Sampled audio clips of the drum solo became known as the Amen break, which has been used in thousands of tracks in many musical genres, including breakcore, drum and bass, hip hop, jungle, big beat and industrial.

The "Color Him Father" record sold over one million copies, and received a gold record awarded by the Recording Industry Association of America on 24 July 1969. It also won a Grammy Award for the Best Rhythm and Blues Song (1970).

The Winstons struggled to secure gigs in the South with their multiracial composition and disbanded in 1970.

== Members ==
- Richard Lewis Spencer (tenor saxophone, lead vocals); died on December 27, 2020, at the age of 78.
- Ray Maritano (alto saxophone, backing vocals); died on July 26, 1995, at the age of 57.
- Quincy Mattison (guitar, backing vocals); died on February 11, 2005, at the age of 67.
- Phil Tolotta (organ, co-lead vocals)
- Sonny Pekerol (bass guitar, backing vocals); died on November 28, 2006, at the age of 64.
- Gregory C. Coleman (drums, backing vocals); died on February 5, 2006, at the age of 61.

Joe Phillips, whilst not an original member, trademarked and reactivated the group in 1996.

The Winstons toured as a backup band for the Impressions.

== Notable songs ==
- "Color Him Father" – (1969, Billboard Hot 100 # 7)
- "Amen, Brother" – (1969)
- "Love of the Common People" – (1969, Billboard Hot 100 # 54)

== See also ==
- Breakbeat
- Drum and bass
