= Chris Chike =

American esports player

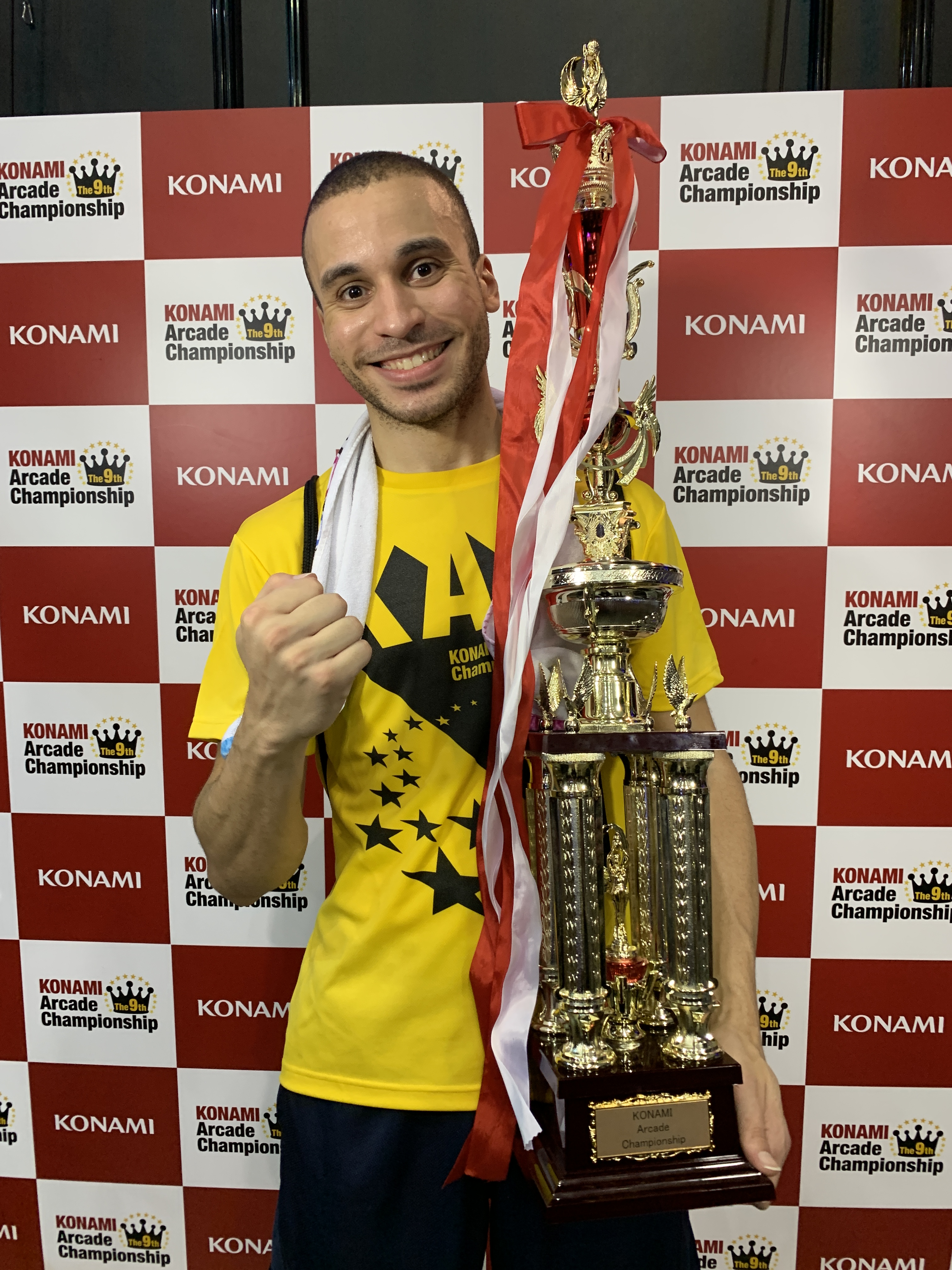
- Chike in 2020
- Born: August 10, 1991 (age 35)
- Other names: "iamchris4life", "CHRS4LFE"
- Occupation: Esports player
- Website: www.iamchris4life.com

Chris Chike, otherwise known online as iamchris4life or CHRS4LFE, is an American esports player known for his skill in a variety of music video games.

== Notable accomplishments ==
=== Guitar Hero ===
Chris holds the official Guinness World Record for "Highest score for a single song on Guitar Hero III: Legends of Rock". On March 11, 2008, he managed to achieve 97 percent completion rate and 840,647 points in DragonForce's "Through the Fire and Flames" in front of Guinness judges. He became the first person to achieve a full combo (hitting every note without losing a combo) on the song, scoring 987,786 points.

Chris was crowned the Guitar Hero III champion at the National Play N Trade tournament in Bloomington, Minnesota. Local tournaments were held March 15 and 16, with close to 1,000 gamers at more than 100 Play N Trade video game stores across the country competing. He won $2,000 from his first-place performance in the song, "Through the Fire and Flames".

=== Dance Dance Revolution ===
Chris took 1st place in Dance Dance Revolution at the 6th Annual Konami Arcade Championship Finals on February 11, 2017, taking place at the Japan Amusement Expo 2017. This was the first year that players from North America were allowed to participate.

Chris automatically qualified for the 7th Annual Konami Arcade Championship, which took place on February 10, 2018, due to winning the championship the year prior. He ultimately finished as the runner-up to Korean DDR player Yoon Sang Yeon, also known as FEFEMZ.

Chris was seeded #1 in the world for the 8th Konami Arcade Championship, held in January 2019. However, he was again the runner-up, as FEFEMZ repeated his first-place finish.

Chris was seeded #1 in the world for the 9th Konami Arcade Championship, held in February 2020. He finished first place.

As of 2022, Chris currently holds over 30 world score records on songs in Konami's third most recent DDR version, DanceDanceRevolution A20 Plus. He is the first player to attain Perfect Full Combo (obtaining a "perfect" or higher judgment on all notes) on a level 19 difficulty song on play style Single. Chris is also the first to attain Marvelous Full Combo (obtaining a "marvelous" judgment on all notes and obtaining the highest possible score) a level 18 song on play style Single.

On March 5, 2022, Chris became the first person to attain a Marvelous Full Combo on every song from Levels 1–16 on play style Single in DDR A20 Plus, an achievement which entails gaining a Marvelous Full Combo on over 4,000 charts.

In Dance Dance Revolution A3 (released in 2022), Chris continued to post top scores globally and won first place at the North American Mistake on the Lake 5 tournament in October 2023, ahead of finalists MARQQQ and Harujun. He achieved multiple world-leading scores on A3 songs including "Good Looking", "[ ]DENTITY", "Sector", and "Eon Break", with several verified Marvelous Full Combos and 1,000,000-point scores.

Following the launch of Dance Dance Revolution World in 2024, Chris remained active at the top of the international leaderboard, earning #1 scores on songs such as "Saiph", "3y3s", "MAXX UNLIMITED", and "ONYX". He continues to be ranked the number one American DDR player and one of the highest-scoring competitors worldwide, maintaining over a dozen verified world #1 scores across A3 and WORLD versions as of 2025.
