= Dance Dance Revolution =

Video game series

- Logo used from 2010 to 2024
- Genres: Music, Exercise
- Developers: Konami, Bemani
- Publishers: Konami, Nintendo, Disney Interactive Studios, Keen, Betson
- Platforms: Arcade; Bemani Pocket; Dreamcast; DVD game Game Boy Color; GameCube iOS; Microsoft Windows; Mobile game Android; Nintendo 64; PlayStation; PlayStation 2 PlayStation 3 TV game Wii; Xbox; Xbox 360
- First release: Dance Dance Revolution; November 18, 1998
- Latest release: Dance Dance Revolution World; June 12, 2024
- Spin-offs: Dance Dance Revolution Solo

Dance Dance Revolution (Japanese: ダンスダンスレボリューション, Hepburn: Dansu Dansu Reboryūshon) (abbreviated DDR; also called DanRevo, Dance Revo, or DanceRevo; stylized as DanceDanceRevolution since SuperNOVA) is a music video game series produced by Konami. Introduced in Japan in 1998 as part of the Bemani series, and released in North America and Europe in 1999, Dance Dance Revolution is the pioneering series of the rhythm and dance genre in video games. Players stand on a "dance platform" or stage and hit colored arrows laid out in a cross with their feet to musical and visual cues. Players are judged by how well they time their dance to the patterns presented to them and are allowed to choose more music to play to if they receive a passing score.

Dance Dance Revolution has been met with critical acclaim for its originality and stamina in the video game market, as well as popularizing the use of videogames as a medium for fitness and exercise. There have been dozens of arcade-based releases across several countries and hundreds of home video game console releases, promoting a music library of original songs produced by Konami's in-house artists and an eclectic set of licensed music from many different genres. The game is also known for its passionate fanbase, as well as its growing competitive tournament scene. The DDR series has also inspired similar games such as Pump it Up by Andamiro and In the Groove by Roxor Games.

The series' current arcade version is Dance Dance Revolution World, released on June 12, 2024.

== Gameplay ==
Demonstration of the typical gameplay style and interface of games within the Dance Dance Revolution series

A video showcasing a person playing Dance Dance Revolution

The core game involves the player stepping their feet to correspond with the arrows that appear on the screen and the beat of the song playing. During normal gameplay, arrows scroll upwards from the bottom of the screen and pass over a set of stationary arrows near the top (referred to as the "guide arrows" or "receptors", officially known as the Step Zone). When the scrolling arrows overlap the stationary ones, the player must step on the corresponding arrows on the dance platform. Upon doing so, they are given a judgement for their accuracy of every streaked note (From highest to lowest: Marvelous, (Note: First appeared in the Nonstop and Challenge mod of EXTREME and first used for normal gameplay as of SuperNOVA 2.) Perfect, Great, Good, Almost, (Note: Boo for 5thMIX and earlier. Merged with Good for X2 onwards. This judgment (together with Good after merging) no longer breaks combo from DDR 2013 onwards and adds points from A onwards.) Miss (Note: Boo for SuperNOVA, SuperNOVA 2, and X only.)).

Additional arrow types were added in later mixes. Freeze Arrows, introduced in MAX, are long green arrows that must be held down until they completely travel through the Step Zone. Each of these arrows awards an "O.K.!" if successfully pressed or an "N.G." when the arrow is released too quickly. An "N.G." decreases the life bar and, starting with X, also breaks any existing combo. X also introduced Shock Arrows, walls of arrows with lightning effects that must be avoided, which will award an "O.K.!" if successfully avoided or an "N.G." if any of the dancer's panels are stepped on. An "N.G." for shock arrows has the same consequences found with freeze arrows, but hitting a shock arrow additionally hides future steps for a short period.

Successfully hitting the arrows in time with the music fills the "Dance Gauge", or life bar, while failure to do so drains it. If the Dance Gauge is fully exhausted during gameplay, the player will fail the song, and the game will be over. Otherwise, the player is taken to the Results Screen, which rates the player's performance with a letter grade and a numerical score, among other statistics. The player may then be given a chance to play again, depending on the settings of the particular machine. The default limit is three songs, though operators can set the limit between one and five.

Aside from play style Single, Dance Dance Revolution provides two other play styles: Versus, where two players can play Single simultaneously, and Double, where one player uses all eight panels. Before the 2013 release of Dance Dance Revolution, some games offer additional modes, such as Course mode (players must play a set of songs back-to-back) and Battle mode (two players compete with a tug-of-war life bar by sending distracting modifiers to each other). Earlier versions also have Couple/Unison Mode, where two players must cooperate to play the song. Course Mode was reintroduced to the series starting with A20.

=== Difficulty ===
Depending on the edition of the game, dance steps are broken into various levels of difficulty, often by color. The difficulty is separated into two to five categories, depending on the game:

Game	Difficulty				
Game	Beginner	Basic	Difficult	Expert	Challenge
SuperNOVA series †	1–4	1–9	2–10	4–10	6–10
X and newer	1–9	2–13	4–16	7–18	4–19
† Dance Dance Revolution Extreme and older also used these difficulties, but with different names and level ranges from game to game. Some difficulties are absent in some games.

The first release of Dance Dance Revolution established two difficulties: Basic for Single and Double modes, and Another for Single mode only. Each chart is rated with a level from 1 to 7, and every release through 3rdMix Plus also attributed a title to each level number. The Internet Ranking Version added Another for Double mode, and a new higher difficulty of Maniac for Single mode only, along with several level 8 charts, titled Exorbitant. 2ndMix Club Version 2 introduced several level 9 charts, titled Catastrophic until 3rdMix Plus and Evolutionary in X3 vs. 2ndMix. The Maniac difficulty was renamed SSR and expanded to Double mode for new songs in 3rdMix, with the name reverting to Maniac in 3rdMix Plus. Beginning with 4thMix, all songs featured the Maniac difficulty in Single and Double mode. Also, Another was renamed to Trick. 4thMix Plus introduced new Maniac charts for 16 songs, while the original Maniac charts were labelled Maniac-S and Maniac-D in this game, with only the new charts remaining in 5thMix.

DDRMAX introduced the "Groove Radar", showing how difficult a particular sequence was in various categories, such as the maximum density of steps. This release removed the level numbers, and among the 42 songs, two ("Flash in the Night" and "Follow Me") have never received any level numbers due to being DDRMAX exclusives. Additionally, DDRMAX changed the difficulty names to Light, Standard, and Heavy. Beginning with DDRMAX2, level numbers were reintroduced, along with a level 10 for "MAX 300" and "MAXX Unlimited". Level 10 was titled Revolutionary in X3 vs. 2ndMix. DDRMAX2 also introduced the Challenge difficulty with "Kakumei" ("革命") on One More Extra Stage, and in Nonstop Challenge Mode songs. Extreme introduced the Beginner difficulty, which premiered in Dancing Stage EuroMix, as the game's easiest difficulty. It is only available in Single mode, except in the DDR Universe series for the Xbox 360, which offers Beginner difficulty in Single and Double modes. Extreme features a total of 37 songs with the Challenge difficulty. Exclusive to Extreme were "flashing 10s" that are harder than regular 10s.

SuperNOVA standardizes the naming of difficulty to the Beginner, Basic, Difficult, Expert, and Challenge respectively.

Due to the old system not going past level 10 and other outdated reasonings, X overhauls the numbering system, now extending the scale of 1–20. All songs from previous versions were re-rated on the new scale, roughly multiplying the old number to 1.4x (i.e. 9 now being 12 or 13). Even though the rating can go up to 20, no song has reached that level. The highest rated song on X is 18. X2 introduced the first 19: "Valkyrie dimension" Challenge. Although the new rating system is an improvement from the old system, it is common for each sequel to re-rate charts to reflect the proper difficulty, such as "POSSESSION" Double Challenge being re-rated from 18 to 19 on both DDR II (Wii) and X3 vs. 2ndMix.

Starting from A, the difficulty is now displayed during gameplay.

=== Groove Radar ===
The foot-rating system was completely removed for the 6th Mix, and replaced by the Groove Radar. The Groove Radar is a graphical representation of the difficulty of a song based in five different areas: Stream, Voltage, Air, Chaos, and Freeze.

- Stream – Indicates the overall density of the steps of the song. A high number of steps is a factor too, but not necessary for a high stream measurement.
- Voltage – Indicates the peak density of the steps (the highest density of arrows that ever appear on the screen at once). Songs with a high BPM (300 or more) usually have a high voltage measurement, since it allows more steps to appear in increasingly halved beats (4th step in a 300 BPM song equals to 8th beat step in a 150 BPM song, and so on), though songs with lower BPM can have a high voltage, even if the halved beats usually cap at 32nd beat (64th beat steps exist in very few songs).
- Chaos – Indicates "off-beat" steps; those that do not occur in 4th or 8th beats.
- Air – Indicates the number of double steps (i.e. jumps) and shock arrows within the song.
- Freeze – Indicates the number of freeze arrows within the song

Each game usually has a song that maxes out a category within the radar. If a song in a following mix or update has a higher category measurement, then the groove radar is renewed so the new song can max out that category, while all previous songs are re-rated in respect to the new radar.

As of DDR 2014, the groove radar also employs a numerical measurement in addition to a graphical representation. Before the update, the radar did not disclose the number by default, though it could be shown by holding the SELECT button while heading to the song select screen.

The Groove Radar was not very popular among seasoned DDR veterans. The foot-rating system was restored to work with the Groove Radar in the North American home version of the game and the next arcade version, MAX2, and almost all future versions (except for versions based on the North American version of EXTREME, which only used foot ratings). All of the MAX songs on MAX2 received foot-ratings, excluding songs that were removed.

SuperNOVA 2 featured special edits of songs specifically meant to max out specific categories on the radar, culminating with "DEAD END ("GROOVE RADAR" Special)", maxing out all five categories. While not related, SuperNOVA 2 also featured a variation known as "My Groove Radar" as part of e-Amusement, which was also divided into five categories, though it was meant to measure the player's stats on songs rather than showing the song's difficulty.

This feature is now removed in DDR WORLD.

=== Extra Stage system ===
The Extra Stage, originally introduced in 1stMIX and reintroduced in MAX, rewards a player for clearing three songs, either with a high enough grade on the final stage or by fulfilling specific play requirements. The player receives the opportunity to play a free extra song, which often defaults to a very difficult song with forced modifiers (such as 1.5x speed and Reverse) and LIFE4 since DDR X2, a life bar identical to the battery bar similar to Challenge mode with 1–4 lives depending on their score in the final stage in SuperNOVA 2 and X, or a non-regaining life bar before SuperNOVA 2. Beginning on SuperNOVA 2, players may be able to access the modifier menu (LIFE GAUGE is disabled) and the forced modifiers (save for battery bar or LIFE4) are no longer used. However, the Replicant-D Action event in X2 and since DDR 2014 did not allow players to select modifiers for its Encore Extra Stage.

Before EXTREME, the Extra Stage song was predetermined. Afterward, any song can be played for the Extra Stage, although there is still a song designated as the Extra Stage (usually marked with red letters on the song wheel, or contained within the EXTRA EXCLUSIVE folder. In all cases (etc. in EXTRA EXCLUSIVE songs), they must be unlocked for regular play). A player who attains a grade of "AA" (or "A" in SuperNOVA or 950.000 Supernova 2 points in A) on the Extra Stage is invited to play an additional stage, "One More Extra Stage" (OMES, or Encore Extra Stage post-SuperNOVA), with another special song option, played in RISKY, in which any combo-breaking step or missed freeze will cause an instant failure. Since X3 VS 2ndMIX, some Encore Extra Stage songs are marked as "ATTACK PERFECT FULL COMBO", where any judgment less than Perfect will cause the player to fail the song, or "ATTACK FLARE GAUGE EX" in DDR A3 where any Perfect or minor judgements will drain the LIFE GAUGE much faster. Unlike Extra Stages, the song for Encore Extra Stages remains predetermined, the only exceptions were SuperNOVA 2 and X, which allowed players to play any song for their Encore Extra Stage. Usually, if this final boss is beaten, a special credits sequence is played.

With the implementation of e-Amusement in DDR, versions after SuperNOVA have contained multiple songs as extra stages, often based on specific conditions, such as playing specific difficulties or songs.

From MAX2 onward, the BPM of Extra Stage songs is displayed as a random, changing number, instead of the song's true BPM to hide it from players, also when KAKUMEI was played as an Encore Extra Stage, its Groove Radar data is hidden by continually animating through random songs' ratings. The random BPM display is replaced with the normal BPM display in the next mix, and as of X, after the said song has been unlocked for both normal and match play.

== Hardware ==
A standard Dance Dance Revolution arcade machine consists of two parts, the cabinet and the dance platform. The cabinet has a wide bottom section, which houses large floor speakers and glowing neon lamps (led on X and Gold cabinets and hide lights/edge lit acrylic on white cabinets). Above this sits a narrower section that contains the monitor, and on top is a lighted marquee graphic, with two or four small speakers and flashing lights on either side. Below the monitor are two sets of buttons (one for each player), each consisting of two triangular selection buttons (four on X and white cabinets) and a center rectangular button, used mainly to confirm a selection or start the game.

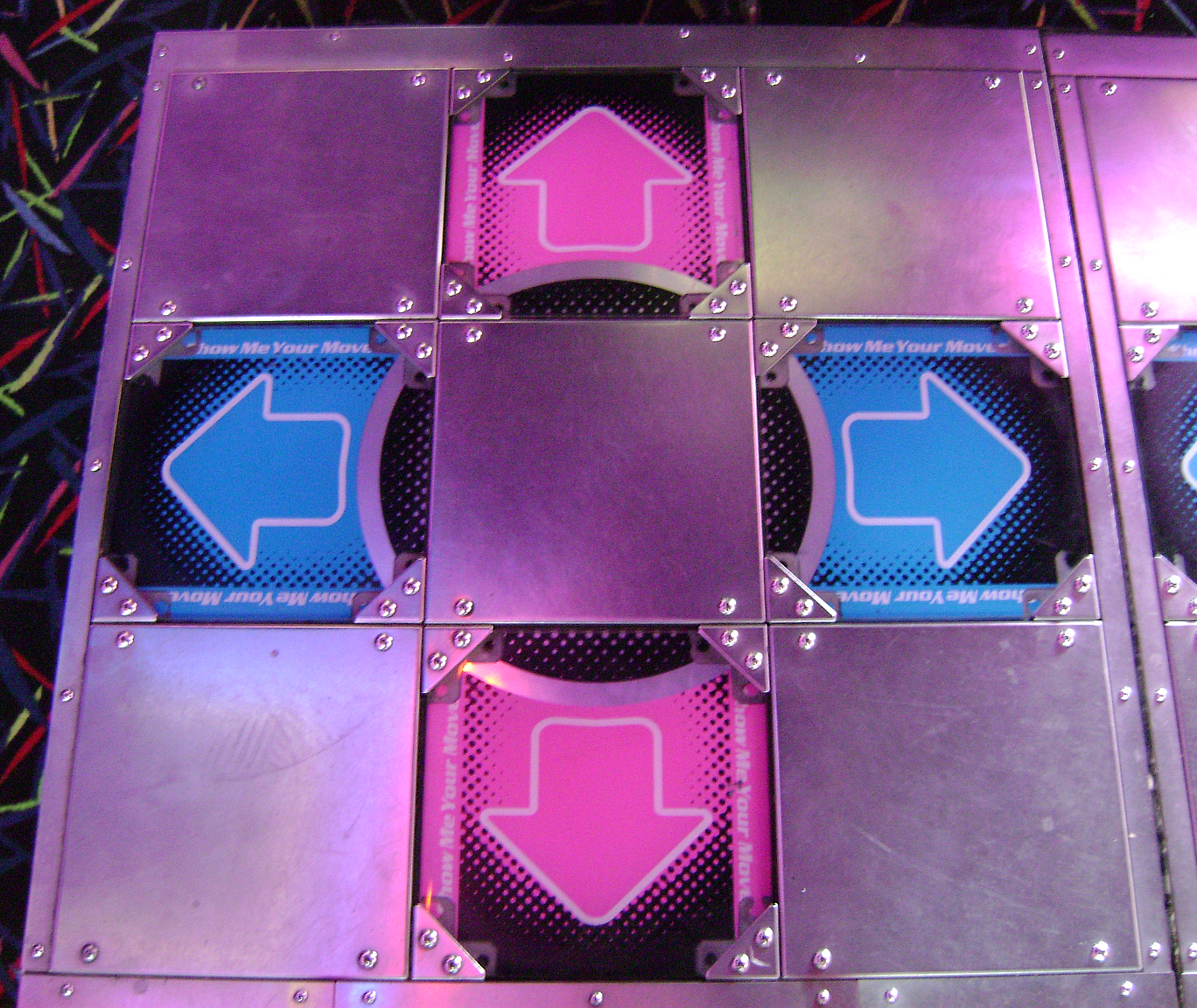
The dance stage, divided into nine sections; four of them, in the cardinal directions, contain pressure sensors for the detection of steps.

The dance stage is a raised metal platform divided into two sides. Each side houses a set of four acrylic glass pads arranged and pointing in the orthogonal directions (left, up, down and right), separated by metal squares. Each pad sits atop four pressure activated switches, one at each edge of each pad, and a software-controlled cold cathode (Led on X and Gold cabinets) lamp illuminating the translucent pad, not available on the white cabinet. A metal safety bar in the shape of an upside-down "U" is mounted to the dance stage behind each player. Some players make use of this safety bar to help maintain proper balance, and to relieve weight from the legs so that arrows can be pressed with greater speed and accuracy.

Some DDR cabinets are equipped with Sony PlayStation memory card slots, allowing the player to insert a compatible memory card before starting a game and save their high scores to the card. Additionally, the equivalent home versions of DDR allow players to create and save custom step patterns (edits) to their memory card — the player can then play those steps on the arcade machine if the same song exists on that machine. This feature is supported in 2ndMix through Extreme. On the DDR X announce, these slots are replaced by USB slots and the players required create edits from Japanese PlayStation 2's DDR X and transferred onto the DDR X arcades onwards. SuperNova series and white cabinets did not support memory card slots. However, it introduced Konami's internet based link system e-Amusement to the series, which can save stats and unlocks for individual players (but cannot store edits). This functionality however, could only be used in Japan. During the North American release of Dance Dance Revolution SuperNOVA 2, an e-Amuse capable machine was made available at a Brunswick Zone Arcade in Naperville, Illinois. This machine was hosted on a different network than the Japanese version, and the only other machine on the network was located in Konami's American branch in El Segundo, California. e-Amusement functionality would later be made available in North America with the release of Dance Dance Revolution A.

The Solo arcade cabinet is smaller and contains only one dance pad, modified to include six arrow panels instead of four (the additional panels are "upper-left" and "upper-right"). These pads generally do not come with a safety bar, but include the option for one to be installed at a later date. The Solo pad also lacks some of the metal plating that the standard pad has, which can make stepping difficult for players who are used to playing on standard machines. An upgrade was available for Solo machines called the "Deluxe pad", which was closer to the standard cabinet's pad. Additionally Solo machines only incorporate two sensors, located horizontally in the center of the arrow, instead of four sensors (one on each edge).

On January 14, 2019, Konami revealed a new "20th Anniversary Model" cabinet redesign, featuring gold-colored plating, a larger screen, and updated dance pad LED lighting. A revised version of the "20th Anniversary Model", known as the "Universal Model", is set to be released in 2026.

Characteristics	=== CRT-based cabinets (1998–2008) ===		
Characteristics	First (System 573-based)	Solo	First (Bemani Python-based)
Photo			
Year released	1998	1999	2006
Thematic color	Black		Black (Fusion); Red (SuperNova); Blue (US SuperNova 2 only)
Initial system board	System 573		Bemani Python (Fusion); Python 2 (SuperNova series)
Screen	CRT-based, (Note: Displays a 4:3 picture.) 29" at 240p or 480i ^{[note 1]}		CRT-based, 29" at 480p
Lighting	Front and panel lights	Front lights only	Front and panel lights
Lighting Technology	Front Lights (Halogen spotlights, pink neon tubes, incandescent bulbs, fluorescent tubes); Panel Lights (Fluorescent tubes)	Front Lights (Halogen spotlights, pink neon tubes, incandescent bulbs, fluorescent tubes); Panel Lights (Fluorescent tubes)	Front Lights (Halogen spotlights, pink neon tubes, incandescent bulbs, fluorescent tubes); Panel Lights: (Fluorescent tubes)
Sound	6 Speakers (2 Full range, 2 Tweeters, 2 Subwoofers)	3 Speakers (2-way Full ranges, 1 Subwoofer)	6 Speakers (2 Full range, 2 Tweeters, 2 Subwoofers)
Card reader ^{[note 2]}	Optional (PS1, e-Amusement and USB)		Yes (e-Amusement and USB) (JPN ver.) (Note: Excluding US and European cabinets)
Panel colors	Pink (vertical); Baby blue (horizontal); Black background; White text and arrow borders	Pink (vertical); Baby Blue (horizontal); Lime (Diagonal); Black Background; White text and arrow Borders	Pink (vertical); Baby Blue (horizontal); Black Background; White text and arrow Borders
Handle bar colors	Red	Purple (optional)	Red
First game included	Dance Dance Revolution (1998)	DDR Solo Bass Mix	Dancing Stage Fusion (Europe); DDR SuperNova (elsewhere)
Final game included	Dance Dance Revolution Extreme	DDR Solo 4thMix Plus	Dance Dance Revolution X3 (Japan/Asia); Dancing Stage SuperNova (Europe); DDR SuperNova 2 (elsewhere)
First supported upgrade (from the first game included)	Dance Dance Revolution (Internet Ranking Version)	Dance Dance Revolution Solo 2000	Dance Dance Revolution SuperNova 2 (excluding Europe)
Highest supported upgrade	Dance Dance Revolution A3 ^{[note 3]}	DDR Solo 4thMix Plus ^{[note 4]}	Dance Dance Revolution A3 ^{[note 3]}

Characteristics	=== LCD-based cabinets (standard) ===	
Characteristics	X	White
Photo		
Year released	2008	2013
Thematic color	Black	White (plus blue for US ver. DDR A)
Initial system board	Bemani PC type 4	
Screen (720p)	LCD-based, 37"	LCD-based, 42"
Lighting	Yes Front and panel lights	Front lights only
Lighting Technology	Front Lights (LED Modules, LED Diodes) Panel Lights (US: LED Modules, JPN: Fluorescent tubes)	Front Lights (LED Modules, LED Diodes)
Sound	US ver. 8 Speakers (4 dome tweeters, 2 Full range, 2 Midbass) - Insignia JPN ver. 6 Speakers (4 Full range, 2 Subwoofers)	6 Speakers (4 Full range, 2 Subwoofers)
Card reader	Yes e-Amusement and USB	e-Amusement (excluding Europe)
Panel colors	Pink (vertical); Baby blue (horizontal)	Pink (vertical); Baby Blue (horizontal); White background and arrows
Handle bar colors	Black	Baby blue and pink
First game included	Dance Dance Revolution X	Dance Dance Revolution (2013, Asia include Japan); Dance Dance Revolution A (US and Europe ver.)
Final game included	Dance Dance Revolution X3 vs. 2nd Mix	N/A (Currently produced)
First supported upgrade (from the first game included)	Dance Dance Revolution X2	Dance Dance Revolution (2014)
Highest supported upgrade	Dance Dance Revolution World	Dance Dance Revolution World ^{[note 6]}

Characteristics	=== LCD-based cabinets (Post-white-themed ACs) ===	
Characteristics	20th Anniversary Model	Universal Model
Photo		
Year released	2019	2026
Thematic color	Gold	Platinum
Initial system board	Bemani PC ADE-6291	
Screen (720p)	LCD-based, 55"	
Lighting	Yes Front and panel lights	
Lighting Technology	Front Lights (LED Strips, LED Diodes); Panel Lights (LED Modules, LED Strips)	
Sound	5 Speakers (4 Full range, 1 Subwoofer)	
Card reader	e-Amusement (excluding Europe)	
Panel colors	Pink (vertical LEDs); Baby blue (horizontal LEDs); White arrow borders; Transparent arrows	
Handle bar colors	Gold	Platinum
First game included	Dance Dance Revolution A20 ^{[note 5]}	Dance Dance Revolution World
Final game included	N/A (Currently produced)	
First supported upgrade (from the first game included)	Dance Dance Revolution A20 Plus	N/A ^{[note 6]}
Highest supported upgrade	Dance Dance Revolution World	Dance Dance Revolution World ^{[note 6]}

- Dance Dance Revolution normally runs at 240p, up to and including Extreme. 4thMix to Extreme use 480i when displaying menus.
- On CRT-based cabinets, card readers are optional. PlayStation memory cards are supported in Asia from 2ndMix Link Edition to Extreme. PlayStation 2 card support for SuperNova worldwide was announced, but cancelled. SuperNova and newer support e-Amusement instead. DDR X and its sequel also support USB drives.
- Support for Dance Dance Revolution A3 on CRT-based cabinets was discontinued on April 28, 2024. An offline version of A3, with fewer features than the online version, was sold for these cabinets on April 30, 2024, in Asia. Outside of Asia, sales of upgrade kits were limited to Dance Dance Revolution SuperNova and SuperNova 2.
- Unofficially, this cabinet can be upgraded to support newer mixes, such as DDR Extreme and SuperNova 2.
- This cabinet was first demonstrated at a private JAEPO 2019 conference. It displayed a 20th anniversary title screen, and gameplay was not allowed. During the 8th Konami Arcade Championship (KAC), the DDR finalists played on a gold cabinet running Dance Dance Revolution A.
- Dance Dance Revolution A to World receive online updates outside of Europe. In Europe, offline updates for DDR A, DDR A20+ and DDR World are used instead, which must be installed by the operator. The game otherwise remains the same, with one exception: an upgrade kit can be used to convert a European DDR A machine to DDR A20+.

During the X era of Dance Dance Revolution, two cabinet variants were made available to arcades. The region in which the game was sold determined which cabinet was received. In the USA and most international regions, a cabinet produced by Raw Thrills Games was made available. This cabinet was of inferior quality, with subpar sound and ear-piercing top speakers, along with lackluster bass speakers. The cabinet was shipped with a dance stage prone to premature failure due to low-quality hardware components. On the other hand, the Konami Original cabinet was made available for the Japanese region. This cabinet was made of much higher quality materials and components, particularly evident in the use of edge-lit acrylic panels, RGB LED light bars, and a high-quality dance stage with exceptional sensors and overall aesthetic design.

Dance Dance Revolution 2ndMix was updated after its initial release with a few new songs and the ability to connect to and play alongside Konami's DJ simulator games, Beatmania IIDX. While the official name of that version of DDR when alone was Dance Dance Revolution 2ndMix Link Version, when connected to the two Beatmania IIDX cabinets it was compatible with it was referred to by two other unique names.

=== System boards ===
Dance Dance Revolution's hardware has evolved over time, in line with other Bemani games. The first mixes were based on the original PlayStation's hardware, with a limited set of subsequent games running on PlayStation 2 based hardware. Beginning with DDR X, all new cabinets began to utilize standard PC hardware, typically installed with a Windows Embedded operating system.

The first Dance Dance Revolution as well as its followup DDR 2ndMix uses Bemani System 573 Analog as its hardware. DDR 3rdMix replaces this with a Bemani System 573 Digital board, which would be used up to DDR Extreme. Both of these are based on the PlayStation.

Beginning with Dancing Stage Fusion in 2005, the hardware is replaced by Bemani Python, a PlayStation 2-based hardware. DDR SuperNova, released in 2006, utilised a Bemani Python 2 board, originally found in GuitarFreaks V and Drummania V. Bemani Python 2 would also be used in the followup DDR SuperNova 2.

Along with the cabinet change, DDR X also changes its hardware to the PC-based Bemani PC Type 4. This more powerful hardware allows for high definition graphics (Note: Except for first generation DDR arcade cabinets.) and enhanced features. With DDR A, Bemani PC Type 4 is replaced by ADE-704A (ADE-6291 for 20th Anniversary cabinets only), that is still used to this day.

== Music ==
The music of Dance Dance Revolution consists of a large catalogue of songs, with most of them consisting of Konami Originals that are produced in-house by the Bemani Sound Team and other Konami teams. Additionally, DDR features several licensed songs from various record labels. As of March 27, 2026, the latest version, Dance Dance Revolution World, features 1,414 songs, which consists of 208 new (46 licensed, 162 Konami original), 1,204 carried over (94 licensed, 1,110 Konami original), and 2 returning (2 licensed, 0 Konami original).

From the first DDR game in 1998 until the initial release of Dance Dance Revolution A in 2016, the series has licensed hundreds of songs from the Dancemania album series in Japan. This partnership resulted in some of the most popular songs in the series' history, including "Butterfly" by Smile.dk and "Captain Jack (Grandale Remix)" by Captain Jack. Many of these songs were featured in other DDR releases across multiple platforms.

The music direction for the series has evolved over time. Early versions of DDR had a major focus on eurodance and disco house genres of music, with a variety of other songs branching into 1970s disco, 1980s Hi-NRG, and ska, amongst others. This changed into the early-mid 2000s, where the game focused instead on trance, eurobeat, and J-Pop. Current versions of DDR have a heavy focus on a variety of styles, including vocaloid tracks, anime themes, and Billboard Hot 100 hit songs.

== Releases ==
DDR arcade release timeline
1998	Dance Dance Revolution
1999	Dance Dance Revolution 2ndMix and spin-offs ^{[nb1]}
1999	Dance Dance Revolution 3rdMix
2000	Dance Dance Revolution 3rdMix Plus
2000	Dance Dance Revolution 4thMix
2000	Dance Dance Revolution 4thMix Plus
2001	Dance Dance Revolution 5thMix
2001	DDRMAX Dance Dance Revolution 6thMix
2002	DDRMAX2 Dance Dance Revolution 7thMix
2002	Dance Dance Revolution Extreme
2003
2004
2005
2006	Dance Dance Revolution SuperNova
2007	Dance Dance Revolution SuperNova 2
2008	Dance Dance Revolution X
2009
2010	Dance Dance Revolution X2
2011	Dance Dance Revolution X3 vs. 2ndMix
2012
2013	Dance Dance Revolution (2013)
2014	Dance Dance Revolution (2014)
2015
2016	Dance Dance Revolution A
2017
2018
2019	Dance Dance Revolution A20
2020	Dance Dance Revolution A20 Plus
2021
2022	Dance Dance Revolution A3
2023
2024	Dance Dance Revolution World

Dance Dance Revolution has been released in many different countries on many different platforms. Originally released in Japan as an arcade game and then a PlayStation game, which was a bestseller. DDR was later released in North American, Europe, Korea, the whole of Asia, Australia, New Zealand, South America and Mexico on multiple platforms including the PlayStation 2, Xbox, Wii, and many others. Due to demand, Japanese versions of the game, which are usually different from the games released in other countries, are often imported or bootlegged. DDR fansites make an attempt to keep track of the locations of arcade machines throughout the major regions.

=== Home releases ===
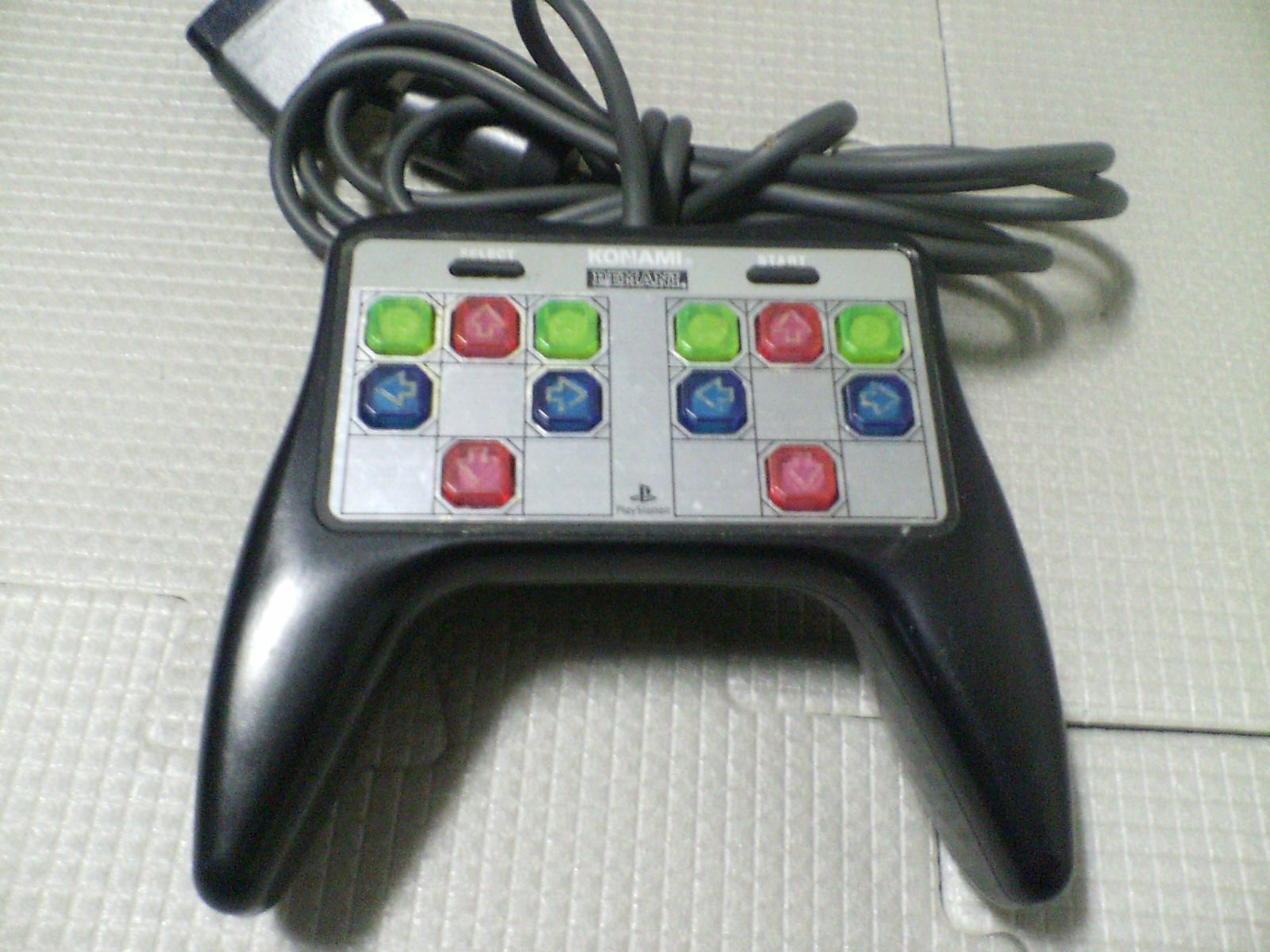
The use of dedicated gamepads is only possible on home console versions.

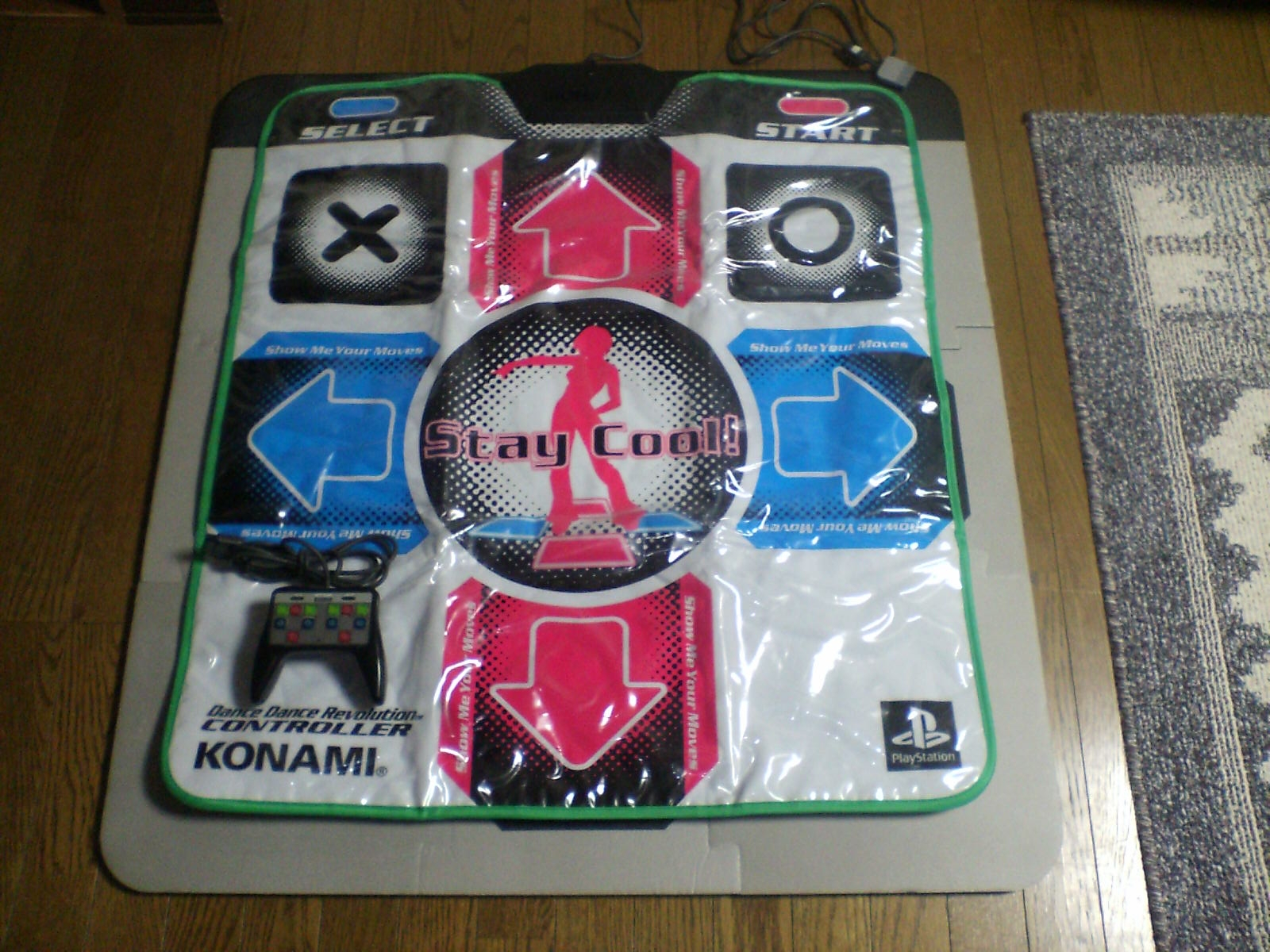
A bundled DDR plastic dance pad

DDR games have been released on various video game consoles, including the PlayStation, Dreamcast, Nintendo 64, PlayStation 2, PlayStation 3, GameCube, Wii, Xbox and Xbox 360, and even PCs. Home versions often contain new songs, songs from the arcade version, and additional features that take advantage of the capabilities of the console (e.g.; Xbox 360 versions such as the Dance Dance Revolution Universe series include support for online multiplayer and downloadable songs over Xbox Live, and high definition graphics). DDR has even reached Nintendo's Game Boy Color, with five versions of Dance Dance Revolution GB released in Japan; these included a series of three mainstream DDR games, a Disney Mix, and an Oha Star. The games come with a small thumb pad that fits over the Game Boy Color's controls to simulate the dance pad.

Home versions are commonly bundled with soft plastic dance pads that are similar in appearance and function to the Nintendo Power Pad. Some third-party manufacturers produce hard metal pads at a higher price.

Three versions of DDR were also produced for the PC, and the 1st was released in North America. It uses the interface of Dance Dance Revolution 4thMix, and contains around 40 songs from the first six mainstream arcade releases. It has not been as well received as the console versions.

The current CS ("console") and PC version of DDR, called Dance Dance Revolution Grand Prix, was also produced in Japan. It uses the user interface of non-20th Anniversary Model version of Dance Dance Revolution A3 since June 22, 2022, and contains 6 licences, 9 revival licences, and over 800 songs from all mainstream arcade releases.

DDR has also seen a number of mobile game releases on Apple iOS and Android platforms, including Dance Dance Revolution S. It was announced alongside several other adaptations of Konami franchises to the iOS platform in January 2009. A free preview version was also released, Dance Dance Revolution S Lite, which features one song and served as a preview for the final version and as a demo. The final version was released in the Japanese App Store on February 27, 2009. Dance Dance Revolution S+, a sequel with in-app song purchasing, was released the same year. In 2019, three mobile games were announced by Konami during the Japan Amusement Expo, representing three Bemani series: Beatmania IIDX, Dance Dance Revolution, and Sound Voltex. Only Beatmania IIDX Ultimate Mobile was released to the public, with Sound Voltex and Dance Dance Revolution Ultimate Mobile being cancelled shortly after location tests.

Dedicated console manufacturer Zuiki announced a compact device called DanceDanceRevolution Classic Mini to be crowdfunded in 2023. The device includes songs from the original DDR to DDR 3rd Mix.

== Similar games ==
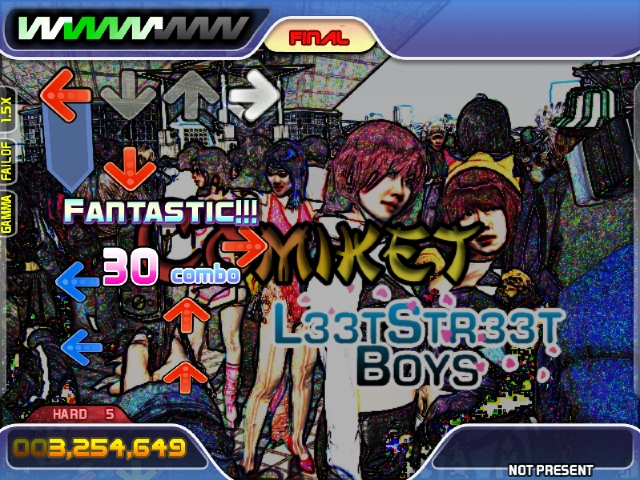
Gameplay screen in StepMania 4, an open source DDR clone

Due to the success of the Dance Dance Revolution franchise, many other games with similar or identical gameplay have been created.

Commercial competitors of DDR include the Korean series Pump It Up and the American series In the Groove by Roxor Games, as well as TechnoMotion by F2 Systems, EZ2Dancer by Amuseworld, and MC Groovz Dance Craze by Mad Catz.

In the Groove was met with legal action by Konami and resulted in Konami's acquisition of the game's intellectual property.

A Christian version of DDR, named Dance Praise, has been made by Digital Praise. Ubisoft produced a dance game based on Disney's The Jungle Book titled The Jungle Book Groove Party.

Fan-made versions of DDR have also been created, many freely available to the public under open source licenses. The most popular of these is StepMania, upon which the game In the Groove is based. These simulators allow for players to create and play their own songs to their own programmed steps. As a result, many DDR fans have held contests and released "mixes" of custom songs and steps for these simulators. Notably the Japanese Foonmix series and the DDR East Invasion Tournamix competitions. Other simulators include Dance with Intensity and pyDance for Windows, both of which are no longer developed, and Feet of Fury, a homebrew game for the Sega Dreamcast.

Besides direct clones, many other games have been released that center around rhythm and dance due to DDR's popularity. Dance! Online released by Acclaim combines dance pad play with an MMO element. ABC's Dancing With the Stars and Codemasters' Dance Factory are more recent examples of games that pay homage to DDR and the genre it created. Konami uses music from its other rhythm game series such as Beatmania and Beatmania IIDX, Drummania, GuitarFreaks, and Pop'n Music, as well as making references to DDR in its other games and vice versa.

== Widespread use ==
Tournaments are held worldwide, with participants usually competing for higher scores or number of Perfect/Marvelous steps (referred to previously as "Perfect Attack" tournaments, now more commonly known as "Marvelous Attack" or "MA tournaments"). Less common are "freestyle" tournaments, where players develop actual dance routines to perform while following the steps in the game.

=== Playing styles ===
Many DDR players, in order to get better scores by focusing on timing and pattern reading, will minimize any extraneous body movement during gameplay. These players are commonly referred to as "technical", "tech" or "perfect attack" (PA) players. These technical players usually play the most difficult songs on the highest difficulty levels in an attempt to perfect their scores, and the most elite players are able to get perfect or near perfect scores on all of the hardest songs in the game. The more "technical" a song gets the more the player must use minimalistic movements in order to hit all the arrows with perfection. These players perfect using their heels as well and often hold on to the bar to take weight off their feet enabling them to move faster and tire more slowly. This style of play is the focus of most competitions.

Other DDR players choose to incorporate complex or flashy techniques into their play movements, and some of these "freestyle" players develop intricate dance routines to perform during a song. Freestyle players tend to choose songs on lower difficulty levels, so that the player is not restricted in their movements by large quantities of required steps. Some players can even dance facing away from the screen.

A freestyling act can also involve performing other stunts while playing. On an episode of ABC's short-lived series Master of Champions, Billy Matsumoto won the episode when he played 5th Mix's "Can't Stop Fallin' In Love (Speed Mix)" on Heavy mode while juggling three lit torches.

=== As an esport ===
In 2004, Dance Dance Revolution became an official sporting event in Norway. The first official club, DDR Oslo, was founded in 2004. The tournaments in Norway were divided into two parts. First there was a group play where the two or three best players from each group went to the final rounds. Elimination of the player with the lowest game score was used for each round in the finals. The scoring system used was based on people dancing to two or three songs. Some of the songs were selected randomly and had to be played by everyone. The others were player-chosen, which introduced some strategy into the game, as some songs had higher possible scoring than others. Dancing Stage EuroMix 2 was used for the Norwegian tournaments.

In recent years, Dance Dance Revolution has been promoted by Konami as an esport, mainly through their own competitive tournament, the Konami Arcade Championship. The tournament allows players in different regions around the world to sign up and play in specific online events to earn a spot in the grand finals, typically held in Tokyo, Japan. The first iterations of the tournament were limited only to competitors in Japan. In subsequent years, players from Korea, Taiwan, and other Asian countries were allowed to enter. The 6th Annual tournament, which concluded on February 11, 2017, was notable for being the first time that competitors from the United States were eligible to enter. The 7th Annual event, which concluded on February 10, 2018, added Indonesia and Canada as eligible competitor regions.

The 9th Annual Konami Arcade Championship added eligibility for players in Australia and New Zealand. The finals took place on February 8, 2020, and resulted in Chris Chike winning the global tournament.

Community-run DDR esports tournaments have gained traction since 2017, and have been growing in popularity and participation every year since, particularly in North America after the release of Dance Dance Revolution A. Recently, DDR has been featured as part of the CEO game tournament event. DDR is also the main event in the annual rhythm game tournament event, The Big Deal, taking place in Dallas, Texas. The 2019 event was historic for being the largest in-person DDR tournament in the game's history. The 2025 event has already broken the record, with 162 current in-person participants pre-registered for the tournament. In March 2023, the first ever upbeat tournament was held at Round1 in Denver, Colorado, with a $10,000 prize pool, the largest in any DDR esports competition to date. upbeat also set the record for the largest ever viewing audience on Twitch for any DDR tournament on the streaming platform at the time.

In 2022, Konami announced a big expansion to its official BEMANI esports organization, the BEMANI PRO LEAGUE. It was confirmed that DDR would be included in the future as a tournament league. The league held a pre-season exhibition in February 2023, with announcements of sponsor teams and player drafts to commence in April 2023. Later on, the regular season took place in late Spring and Summer of 2023, with team ROUND 1 winning the finals. The following season of the league took place in the latter half of 2024, with team TAITO STATION Tradz winning that season's finals.

=== As exercise ===
Many news outlets have reported how playing DDR can be good aerobic exercise; some regular players have reported weight loss of 10–50 pounds (5–20 kg). In one example, a player found that including DDR in her day-to-day life resulted in a loss of 95 pounds (43 kg). Some other examples would be Matthew Keene's account of losing upwards of 150 pounds (68 kg) and Yashar Esfandi's claim of losing 85 pounds (39 kg) in four months through incorporation of DDR. Although the quantity of calories burned by playing DDR have not been scientifically measured, the amount of active movement required to play implies that DDR provides at least some degree of healthy exercise, and is an effective part of a balanced workout routine.

Many home versions of the game have a function to estimate calories burned, given a player's weight. Additionally, players can use "workout mode" to make a diary of calories burned playing DDR and any self-reported changes in the player's weight. The latest arcade release, DanceDanceRevolution WORLD, tracks calories burned per song, as well as the total calories burned by the player for the day. Additionally, the game's interface showcases the equivalent food to the amount of burned calories (such as a banana, a bowl of rice, and spaghetti carbonara).

=== Use in schools ===
At the start of 2006, Konami announced that the DDR games would be used as part of a fitness program to be phased into West Virginia's 765 state schools, starting with its 103 middle schools, over the next two years. The program was conceived by a researcher at West Virginia University's Motor Development Center. California Institute of Technology allows its students to use DDR to fulfill part of its physical education requirement, as students may design their own fitness program, and the University of Kansas has a class for Dance Dance Revolution open for students to take as a 1 credit hour course.

Cyber Coach has sold in excess of 600 systems in schools in the UK and features the DDR-inspired game Disco Disco 2.

== Awards ==
The success of the Dance Dance Revolution series has resulted in two Guinness World Records: "Longest Dance Dance Revolution Marathon", which is currently held by Alex Skudlarek at 16 hours, 18 minutes, and nine seconds, and "Most Widely Used Video Game in Schools".

== Film ==
On October 2, 2018, Deadline reported that Cara Fano would be supervising the production of a film based on the series. The report states that the film "will explore a world on the brink of destruction where the only hope is to unite through the universal language of dance." Stampede Ventures and Branded Pictures Entertainment have partnered to produce the film. Producers J. Todd Harris and Marc Marcum are also working with Konami on the project.

== See also ==
- List of Dance Dance Revolution video games
- Dance Evolution, a Kinect game
- Dance Revolution, a television series inspired by Dance Dance Revolution
- Dance pad
- Exergaming
- BEMANI

== Notes ==
- Dance Dance Revolution 2ndMix spin-offs include Dance Dance Revolution 2ndMix Link Version, Dance Dance Revolution 2ndMix with Beatmania IIDX Club Version and Dance Dance Revolution 2ndMix and Beatmania IIDX Substream Club Version 2.
