= Dance Dance Revolution World =

2024 video game

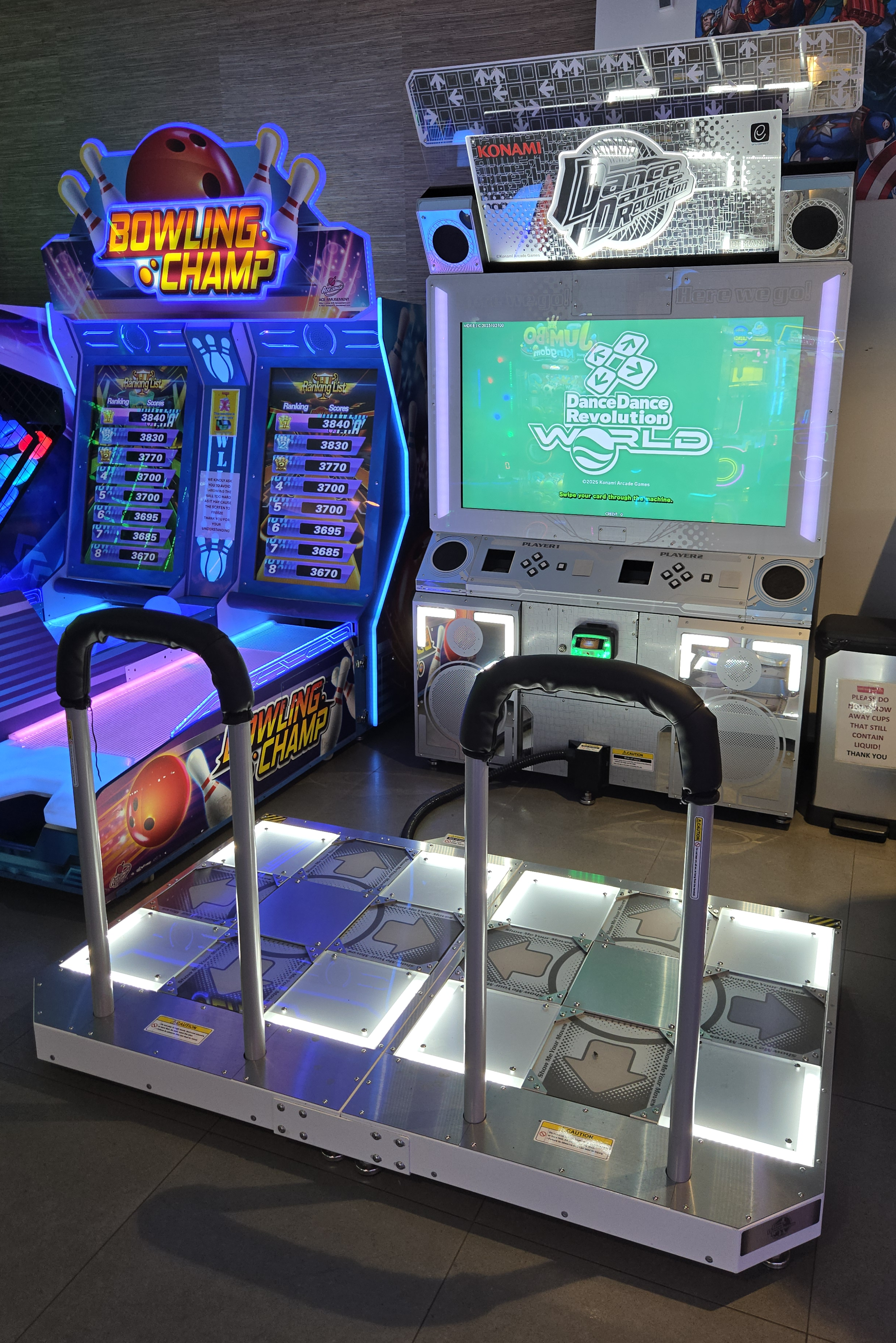
- Release: Online update: AS/AU/US: June 12, 2024 (including Japan and S. Korea); New cabinets: EU: February 4, 2026; US: April 10, 2026; KR: TBA
- Genre: Music

Dance Dance Revolution World (Note: Japanese: ダンスダンスレボリューション ワールド (Dansu Dansu Reboryūshon Wārudo), stylized as DanceDanceRevolution WORLD; officially shortened to DDR WORLD, or unofficially and uncommonly DDR W) is a music video game in the Dance Dance Revolution (DDR) series. It is the sequel to Dance Dance Revolution A3, and the 19th installment of the DDR arcade series in Japan. The game was released as a software upgrade for LCD-based cabinets on June 12, 2024, in Asia, Australasia and the United States. New DDR World cabinets received a worldwide (Note: Confirmed regions include the United States, South Korea, Europe and the EMEA region.) release in 2026, with the first such cabinet debuting at Funland London in the United Kingdom on February 4, 2026.

== Release ==
Dance Dance Revolution World was released on June 12, 2024, in Asia (including Japan, South Korea, and several other countries), Australia, New Zealand, and the United States. It is available as an online update to Dance Dance Revolution A3 LCD-based cabinets. New silver-coloured cabinets, based on the 20th Anniversary DDR cabinet, will launch in 2026 in the European and EMEA markets. The DDR World software on these cabinets has a build date of October 21, 2025. There are currently no plans to release upgrade kits in the latter markets, nor for Dave & Buster's in North America. The latter continues to operate Dance Dance Revolution A20 Plus at 70 locations as of 2026.

This is the first release of Dance Dance Revolution to be unsupported on CRT-based arcade cabinets, as Dance Dance Revolution A3 is the last supported version. Early DDR games, from the first release in 1998 to Dance Dance Revolution SuperNova 2 in 2007, were sold with brand new CRT-based cabinets. Arcades were able to install newer releases on these cabinets by purchasing a Bemani PC upgrade kit. An offline version of Dance Dance Revolution A3 was released on April 30, 2024, for these cabinets. This offline release is also supported on these cabinets if the CRT monitor is replaced with a widescreen LCD monitor.

== Music ==
As of October 2026, Dance Dance Revolution World features 1,483 songs, consisting of 292 new songs (62 licensed and 230 Konami originals), 1,206 returning songs (95 licensed and 1,111 Konami originals), and three revived licenses ("Happy", "No Tears Left to Cry", and "S'il vous président" (Note: Japanese: シル・ヴ・プレジデント)). The songs "Cheerleader" and "Knock Yourself Out XD" by Porter Robinson are the first non-Japanese new licenses, and they were added to DDR World on May 1, 2025, along with their respective music videos. Additionally, three Robinson songs from Dance Dance Revolution A3 are playable in DDR World since the game's launch.

Among the returning songs, DDR World reintroduced "No Tears Left to Cry" by Ariana Grande at launch, which was removed in online versions of previous releases and all versions of DDR A3. The song "Play Hard" by David Guetta featuring Ne-Yo and Akon was initially available, but it was removed in DDR World on July 2, 2024, about five years after it was introduced to the DDR series. "Happy" by Pharrell Williams was added to DDR World on March 26, 2026. This song was previously available in Dance Dance Revolution A to A20 Plus, and it was removed from A20 Plus on June 28, 2021, except for European DDR A machines with the A20 Plus upgrade kit.

DDR World received eleven new mainstream songs in 2026, added gradually over time. The songs consist of:

- "About Damn Time" by Lizzo (July 2026)
- "Better When I'm Dancin'" by Meghan Trainor (July 2026)
- "Blinding Lights" by The Weeknd (March 2026)
- "Firework" by Katy Perry (March 2026)
- "Good Life" by Jon Batiste (October 2026)
- "Levitating" by Dua Lipa (July 2026)
- "Miles on It" by Marshmello and Kane Brown (May 2026)
- "One Kiss" by Calvin Harris and Dua Lipa (October 2026)
- "Rain on Me" by Lady Gaga and Ariana Grande (March 2026)
- "Somedays" by Sonny Fodera, featuring Jazzy and D.O.D. (March 2026)
- "Stars in the Sky" by Kid Cudi (May 2026)

In Europe, DDR World has a reduced song list consisting of 143 new songs at launch, for a total of 1,109 songs. An offline update adds 24 new songs, for a total of 1,133 songs. Among the missing songs are seven Nonstop Challenge remixes from DDRMAX2, five songs from DDR SuperNova 2 to DDR X3, five remixes from DDR X3, and the four Undertale songs by Toby Fox from DDR A3. For the new mainstream songs, only the March 2026 additions and the reintroduced song "Happy" by Pharrell Williams are available in Europe, though they require an offline update to be installed.

== Features ==
Dance Dance Revolution World introduces some gameplay refinements. A new modifier called Constant adjusts arrow visibility based on BPM, for more flexibility.

Scroll speed customization has been expanded, now adjustable in 0.05x increments, giving players finer control over timing and readability. As of June 10th, 2025, Real Speed has been added as an alternative way of setting speed. This allows the player to set a maximum scroll speed based on the maximum BPM of the song picked, carrying over to all songs and functioning similarly to OpenITG's M-Mod.
