= Cyber Coach =

Cyber Coach is a Virtual Dance Instructor and Dance Mat system created by Quick Controls Ltd of Bolton, UK. The system was shortlisted for a BETT Award in 2009 and won a National Business Award for Innovation in 2009. Lancashire Grid for Learning undertook a comprehensive review of the system in 2009 and endorsed the system to their schools. A version for primary schools called "Cyber Coach Smart" has been launched. In 2017, Cyber Coach and Manchester Metropolitan University launched Emile Education
