= Dance Dance Revolution A =

2016 video game

- Developers: Konami, Bemani
- Publisher: Konami
- Series: Dance Dance Revolution
- Platform: Arcade
- Release: JP/AS: March 30, 2016; KR: April 4, 2016; NA: July 6, 2016 (see release history); EU: December 15, 2017
- Genres: Music, exercise
- Modes: Single-player, multiplayer
- Arcade system: Bemani PC Type 5 (Windows 10 Embedded Standard)

Dance Dance Revolution A (Note: Japanese: DansuDansuReboryūshon Ēsu (ダンスダンスレボリューションエース), stylized as DanceDanceRevolution A; officially shortened to DDR A) (pronounced Ace) is a music video game, the 16th installment of the Dance Dance Revolution arcade series in Japan (the 8th in Europe and the 7th in North America), and the sequel to the 2014 release of Dance Dance Revolution. It was released on March 30, 2016 in Japan and Asia as a dedicated cabinet and as an upgrade kit, with Japan receiving a localized build, while the Korean release was delayed to the next week. This game was also released in North America later in 2016, in the form of new cabinets with e-Amusement connectivity, while Europe received new offline cabinets on December 15, 2017. It is the first international arcade release of Dance Dance Revolution since Dance Dance Revolution X2.

A sequel, titled Dance Dance Revolution A20, was released in 2019 to celebrate the 20th anniversary of the series.

== Development ==
The game was first announced during the Grand Final of the 5th Konami Arcade Championship (KAC), which was held on the final day of the Japanese Amusement Expo (JAEPO) 2016 event, February 20, 2016.

== Features ==
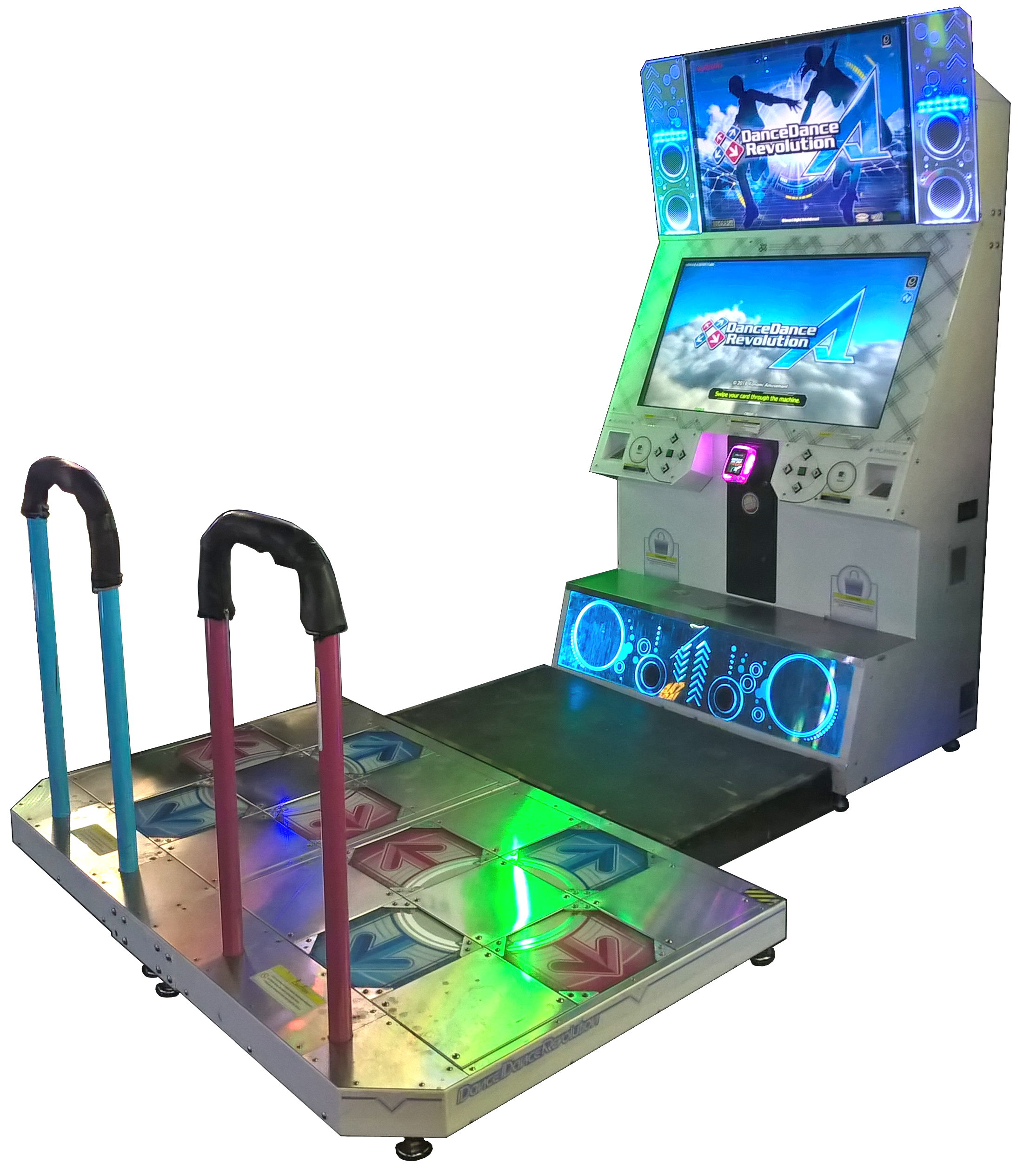
Dance Dance Revolution A in Oakville, Ontario, Canada

The game features a handful of overhauls to the existing system used by previous games. The most significant change is made towards the song selection screen. While the previous game, DDR 2014, still uses an interface that resembles the Cover Flow system introduced in DDR X2, DDR A changes it into a Sound Voltex-like pagelist giving the illusion of a touchable interface, although selection is still made using buttons below the monitor. Nine song choices, organized in three rows, are in clear view of the player at any time; scrolling past them will reveal additional row of songs, somewhat like the one used in DDR 4thMix. For the first time, selection can be done using the up and down buttons to skip a row of songs (in previous games, these buttons are exclusively used for e-Amusement services and certain modifiers). While highlighting a song is needed to display their detailed information, all of the visible song choices always display their song title and the current difficulty level selected, reducing the time needed to browse through them.

The Groove Radar, previously fixed for each chart, now behaves accordingly whether the player sets options that eliminate arrows (e.g. activating "Freeze: Off" causes the Freeze portion of the radar to disappear) or not. The grading system also includes "+" and "-" levels for all grades except for AAA and E (though D does not have a "-" level). There are also aesthetic changes. If the player's dance meter is depleted down to the red level, a "danger overlay" will be added behind the player's arrow zone and the arcade cabinet's speakers will turn red.

Another expanded feature from previous DanceDanceRevolution versions is the "Clear Lamp" progress tracking system. This allows players to quickly see how well they performed on songs directly on the Music Select screen. The Clear Lamps are located next to each song, and will shine with different colors and intensities. The different colors are listed below:

Lamp Color	Description	Conditions
Dark Gray	Not Played	The player has not yet played the song.
Dark Amber	Failed	The player attempted the song, but did not pass.
Purple	Assist Clear	The song was passed with the help of modifiers that directly affect the number of steps.
Bright Amber	Normal Clear	The player passed the song.
Light Red	Extra Clear	The player passed the song either on EXTRA STAGE or under "LIFE 4" life gauge requirements.
Flashing Blue	Good Full Combo	The player obtained a full combo on the song.
Flashing Green	Great Full Combo	The player obtained a full combo with "Great" or better judgments on each step.
Flashing Gold	Perfect Full Combo	The player obtained a full combo with "Perfect" or better judgments on each step.
White/Rainbow	Marvelous Full Combo	The player received all "Marvelous" judgements on each step of the song and obtained a perfect score.

The in-game characters now have the dance routines of the Supernova era (which in turn are based on those from the Ultramix series), though premade routines are retained. Some options have also been removed or changed to fit better with the gameplay.

Due to failures related with Windows XP Embedded, all cabinets are replaced by DDR (2013) cabinets or have arcade boards changed from DDR (2013) cabinets. These cabinets have a new Bemani PC Type 5 that runs Windows 7 Embedded Standard.

A mid-2017 update block all CHALLENGE-only songs and "Groove Radar" Special and X-Special charts to users without e-Amusement passes.

=== Characters ===
A total of 17 characters are available in Dance Dance Revolution A. Of these, 10 are common to the Dance Dance Revolution SuperNova series and earlier games, but Afro, Jenny, Rage, and Yuni use new outfits instead of DDR X2's outfits. DDR X adds Bonnie and Zero, DDR X2 adds Rinon, and DDR A adds three unlockable new outfits for Emi, Alice, and Rinon. Victory Concent returns as a playable character, but only appears on stage if the character selector is in RANDOM. On the 6th KONAMI Arcade Championship, Yuni received a KAC outfit only for players that cleared both the 6th KAC folders.

== Events ==
=== Extra Stage ===
The Extra Stage system retains the star requirement introduced in Dance Dance Revolution X3 VS 2ndMix. The player is required to obtain 9 stars in a round to be allowed an extra song, the number of stars of which is determined by the player's grade. However, the game also introduces the concept of Extra Level which becomes an additional equation to the number of stars attainable. Once again, Extra Stages can only be obtained in Premium Mode, and for Japan only, PASELI users must choice PASELI-Premium instead of PASELI-Standard due to renewal pay method.

Extra Level, introduced on June 13, 2016, rewards the player who plays the game multiple times with an increased chance to gain an extra stage. Each player starts at Level 1 at the start of a day. By completing three rounds, they are promoted to Level 2, which adds an additional 3 stars for every round the player completes afterward. Completing four more rounds promotes the player to Level 3, which nets the player a free access to Extra Stage for every round afterward. The promotion is applicable for a day, however; the level will be demoted back to 1 the next day. Before April 26, 2018, the level will also be demoted if the player selects ENDYMION as Extra Stage Level 3.

Before June 13, 2016, DDR A used the traditional Extra Stage system of previous games, which after the update was refitted into the Extra Exclusive folder. The exclusive song added during this period was New Century.

==== Extra Exclusive ====
Introduced also on June 13, 2016, this folder is essentially a replacement for the traditional Extra Stage system of the previous games: the songs in this folder can only be played in Extra Stage. The player's current Extra Level determines the number of songs available inside the folder. Some of them have recently been made available in Final Stage, allowing those without Premium Mode to access them. There are 16 songs in this folder and all are marked on red.

==== Extra Savior ====
Introduced on June 13, 2016, Extra Savior allows the player to unlock hidden songs by playing them in Extra Stage. These not only include new additions for this game, but also some hidden songs yet to be unlocked for the general public from previous games. Extra Level impacts the unlock system; if the player is in Level 1 or 2, they must clear the song to unlock them, while being in Level 3 unlocks them regardless if the player clears the stage or not. Also, unlocking a song's difficulty automatically unlocks all difficulties below them, e.g. unlocking the song's Difficult stepchart unlocks the Beginner and Basic difficulties as well. If the EXTRA SAVIOR folder is marked in purple instead of green, the charts must be unlocked in order: BASIC → DIFFICULT → EXPERT.

On October 6, 2016, six Extra Savior songs were added which have an additional unlock requirement before the player can access them in the folder called New Generation Natsu no Ryuusei Festa 2016 (renamed as New Generation 夏の流星フェスタ2016 on Asian versions). The player needs to play a round of either of the following three Bemani games: beatmania IIDX 23 copula, jubeat Qubell, or SOUND VOLTEX III GRAVITY WARS. As promotion, clearing one of the songs added, Triple Counter, unlocks an alternate skin for one of three characters depending on the chart completed. Clearing its Basic chart unlocks EMI (JOMANDA), Difficult nets ALICE (VALLIS-NERIA), and Expert unlocks RINON (Lisa-RICCIA). However, New Generation Natsu no Ryuusei Festa 2016 was not available in the North American release of the game until December 1, 2016.

==== Encore Extra Stage ====
If the player manages to score AA or higher in ENDYMION on Basic or higher difficulty as Extra Stage, the player is granted access to the Encore Extra Stage, ACE FOR ACES. A special Risky dance meter is applied, in which scoring Great or lower immediately ends the game. No time is allowed to change options, as the song immediately starts upon completing the previous stage.

=== Baby-Lon's and Rinon's Adventures ===
Started on August 8, 2016, Baby-Lon's Adventure event is centered on the character Baby-Lon. At the end of each stage, the player will be given a short cinematic of Baby-Lon climbing stairs, the number of which depends on the player's grade. Once reaching a certain number, the player earns a new song, after which Baby-Lon is sent back down again for another climb. Steps gained are not cumulative as each climb is done separately (gaining 10 steps when the player only needs 2 more means that the remaining 8 steps are lost). There are a total of 5 songs available for unlock in this event.

One variant after any player completes this event, started on April 27, 2017, is Rinon's Adventure, but the steps can only be obtained in Extra Stage. There are all 10 Extra Exclusive songs and their Challenge charts available for unlock in this event. Unlocking them all additionally allows the player unlocking ENDYMION (Initially as an Extra Exclusive song by reaching Extra Stage Level 3 and on April 26, 2018 as Level 1) and ACE FOR ACES (Initially Encore Extra, on April 26, 2018 as an Extra Exclusive song by reaching Extra Stage Level 2 and on July 24, 2018 as Level 1), but it challenge charts is enabled on Extra Stage Level 1 (initially Level 2).

=== Ddr Selection ===
On September 26, 2018, the DDR SELECTION category was added to Dance Dance Revolution A, in order to commemorate the 20th anniversary of the Dance Dance Revolution series, having 5 different interfaces.

The DDR SELECTION category has sub-folders based on different eras of the game, as well as both EXTRA SAVIOR folders DDR 20th Anniversary songs and DDR A x pop'n music peace 20th Anniversaries for brand-new songs. When playing a song under this category (marked in gold instead of white (a default song), yellow (an unlocked song), green (an EXTRA SAVIOR unlockable) or red (an EXTRA EXCLUSIVE song)), the UI will change to match that of one of the games released in that period, including videos based on its original background animations (except for 4 songs of DDR (1st) and 2ndMIX which use their X3 VS 2ndMIX videos) or EXTREME's random movies, DANGER animations, scoring changes (Can switch the scoring to SuperNOVA2 score or EX SCORE via operator's intervention), and background images or banners, if applicable.

Selecting any of two EXTRA SAVIOR folders or other category retain the original UI. The brand-new songs have BEGINNER and BASIC charts available by default and harder charts must be unlocked in order via EXTRA SAVIOR. All options if the user plays with DDR (1st) UI are forced to FLAT and CLASSIC. SCREEN FILTER and GUIDE LINE are disabled. Only SPEED, TURN, ASSIST and LIFE GAUGE options are changed by the user.

== Release ==
Dance Dance Revolution A was released on July 6, 2016 in the United States. As of May 2019, the game is available in 66 locations in the United States, including 34 Dave & Buster's locations, and all 28 Round1 locations. Of these, ten Round1 locations are each equipped with two Dance Dance Revolution A machines, instead of just one.

Internationally, Dance Dance Revolution A launched in Canada on December 5, 2016, during the grand opening of the Dave & Buster's in Oakville, Ontario. This is the first Dance Dance Revolution release in the country after Dance Dance Revolution X in 2009 and the import of Dance Dance Revolution X2 in 2011, and it is the first Canadian release with online connectivity. As with the United States, a few Canadian arcades have imported Dance Dance Revolution A machines, but without the e-Amusement service provided by Konami. The game was released in Europe on December 15, 2017 as an offline release. As of May 2019, there are 17 Dance Dance Revolution A arcade machines in Europe.

New cabinets, and upgrades since 2013, feature a 42" monitor at 1080p. However, the game only operates at 720p. Upgrades of DDR X, X2 and X3 feature a 37" monitor at 720p. Legacy cabinets, initially running SuperNova 2 or an older release, feature a 29" monitor at 480p.

== Music ==
There are 157 new songs of 809 total (129 new songs of 773 total in the North American release and 119 new songs of 761 total in the European release). 3 of them were available for play within a limited time period in Dance Dance Revolution (2014) as promotion. The promotional teaser for the game confirmed the following artists who composed the game's music: U1-ASAMi, Captain KING, DJ TOTTO, Musical Cosmology, Sota F., L.E.D.-G, Zodiac Fall, TAG, Nekomata Master, and CLUB SPICE. Most of the songs that made their Dance Dance Revolution arcade release debut on Dance Dance Revolution X3 VS 2ndMix, Dance Dance Revolution (2013), and Dance Dance Revolution (2014) have finally made their North American and European Dance Dance Revolution arcade release debut, including songs that have never been on a North American or European Dance Dance Revolution release have finally made their North American and European Dance Dance Revolution release debut, as those games were never released in those regions. Also, this marks the North American and European Dance Dance Revolution arcade release debut of I'm so Happy and Theory of Eternity from Dance Dance Revolution X2 as those songs weren't available on the North American and European arcade releases of the game due to the lack of e-Amusement in those regions. All Dancemania licenses have been removed due to their licenses expiring, making Dance Dance Revolution A the first core arcade Dance Dance Revolution title to have no traditional Dancemania licenses in it.

This is the first arcade appearance of Billboard Hot 100 songs since Dance Dance Revolution X2. This game also continues the previous licensing partnerships with EXIT TUNES, which includes Vocaloid music, and Team Shanghai Alice, which includes music based on Touhou Project.

36 songs are exclusive to Asian releases of the game:

- 28 licenses from Dance Dance Revolution A
- Mirai Prism (ミライプリズム) from Dance Dance Revolution (2014)
- Zutto Mitsumeteite (Ryu☆Remix) (ずっとみつめていて (Ryu☆Remix)) from Dance Dance Revolution (2013)
- All licenses from Dance Dance Revolution X3 vs. 2ndMix

With the release of Dance Dance Revolution A20, 31 of the region-locked songs were made available in North America, while another 4 songs were limited to Local Mode and Maintenance Mode in North America. The limitation was removed in Hawaiian releases and Dance Dance Revolution A20 Plus. The Light remains exclusive to Asian releases.

12 songs are not included in the European release of the game:

- 10 songs (Houkago Stride (放課後ストライド), the Konami 50th Anniversary Memorial songs, and 5 HinaBitter♪ songs) from Dance Dance Revolution A
- Maware! Setsugetsuka (回レ！雪月花) from Dance Dance Revolution (2013)
- only my railgun from Dance Dance Revolution X2

== Reception ==
Dance Dance Revolution A was a successful release in the United States and internationally. As of May 2019, there were 145 arcade machines available worldwide for this game, of which 67 are located in the Americas and 17 are located in Europe. This is the second best-selling international arcade release for Dance Dance Revolution, behind Dance Dance Revolution SuperNova and its sequel, Dance Dance Revolution SuperNova 2, which had combined sales of over 330 arcade machines.
