= Dance Dance Revolution A20 =

2019 video game

- Developers: Konami, Bemani
- Publisher: Konami
- Series: Dance Dance Revolution
- Platform: Arcade
- Release: A20: JP: March 20, 2019; AS: July 24, 2019; KR: August 1, 2019; NA: September 24, 2019 (see release history); A20 Plus: JP: July 1, 2020; AS/KR/NA: July 6, 2020
- Genres: Music, exercise
- Modes: Single-player, multiplayer
- Arcade system: Bemani PC Type 4, Type 5 or ADE-704A (ADE-6291 for golden cabinets only)

Dance Dance Revolution A20 (Note: DansuDansuReboryūshon Ēsu Tsū ō (ダンスダンスレボリューションエースツーオー)) is a music video game, the 17th installment of the Dance Dance Revolution arcade series in Japan (the 8th in North America), and the sequel to Dance Dance Revolution A. The game was released on new, golden cabinets on March 20, 2019, in Japan. A software upgrade for older cabinets for Japan and Asia was released on July 24, 2019, with South Korea receiving a localized release on August 1, 2019, and North America on September 24, 2019. A location test in Europe began on October 7, 2019, and ended on March 16, 2020.

Dance Dance Revolution A20 Plus is an expansion pack that adds 106 new songs, 19 new courses, and other content. It was released on July 1, 2020, for Japanese 20th Anniversary cabinets and on July 6, 2020, for cabinets using an upgrade kit.

== Development ==
On July 4, 2018, Konami opened a Dance Dance Revolution Twitter account in preparation of the series' 20th anniversary, which was celebrated on September 26, 2018. Dance Dance Revolution 20th Anniversary was announced at JAEPO 2019 as a placeholder. The game was first announced on January 26, 2019, during the Dance Dance Revolution A grand final of The 8th KONAMI Arcade Championship finals.

== Features ==
The game features the notable return of courses, which was removed in Dance Dance Revolution (2013). There are two kinds of courses, only selectable on the first stage: Nonstop and Class. Unlike the previous main Dance Dance Revolution arcade games, courses are accessed from the song selection screen instead of a separate menu, similar to both Dancing Stage EuroMix games. Both Nonstop and Class play four songs back-to-back. All NONSTOP courses can be switched to CHALLENGE MODE if the LIFE GAUGE option is set to RISKY or LIFE4. Class, intended to measure the player's skill, places a stricter rules on the gameplay; the player cannot change Turn and Assist options and is forced to play on the "Grade" life gauge, which starts out full and depletes faster if it goes down. Players are given a martial arts-inspired "dan rank" certification based on the player's chosen course difficulty. Class is available for golden cabinets only and unavailable in Versus Play. With the installation of the blue interface, it's possible to switch languages in-game, including Japanese, English and Korean as options.

All 14 characters from Dance Dance Revolution A return in this game. Victory Concent is only available as a randomly selected character. Dark Alice, Dark Emi, Black Rinon and a 6th KAC costume for Yuni can be unlocked. Additionally, when playing the song Yuni's Nocturnal Days, Yuni wears her X2 costume and is automatically selected as a character.

The game introduces a new cabinet design based on the Dance Rush cabinet, but colored gold.

== Events ==
=== Extra Stage ===
The Extra Stage system retains the star requirement introduced in Dance Dance Revolution X3 VS 2ndMix. The player is required to obtain 9 stars in a round to be allowed an extra song, the number of stars of which is determined by the player's grade. Extra Stages can only be obtained in Premium Mode. For players in Asia territories and North America, this requires "Premium Play" to be selected when the game starts. For players in Japan, Premium Play requires Konami's PASELI payment system.

==== Extra Exclusive ====
This folder is essentially a replacement for the traditional Extra Stage system of the previous games: the songs in this folder are marked in red and can only be played in Extra Stage.

==== Extra Savior Plus ====
Originally from Dance Dance Revolution A, Extra Savior, now renamed Extra Savior Plus, was added on July 16, 2020, and allows the player to unlock hidden songs by playing them in Extra Stage. These not only include new additions for this game, but also some hidden songs yet to be unlocked for the general public from previous games. This time around, EXTRA SAVIOR works more akin to EXTRA ATTACK from the 2014 game, where charts must be unlocked in order: BEGINNER (only in SINGLE and is unlocked by selecting song) → BASIC → DIFFICULT → EXPERT. Players will earn the same amount of unlock progress regardless of what difficulty is played during EXTRA STAGE. Unlocking a chart requires either clearing the song, or enough failed attempts to unlock it. EXPERT charts require two stage clears or equivalent progress from failed attempts. Using ASSIST options will lower clear progress.

=== Summer Dance Camp ===
The Summer Dance Camp event is a collaboration event between Dance Dance Revolution series and DANCERUSH STARDOM. Stamps can be earned by playing either Dance Dance Revolution A20 (Plus) or DANCERUSH STARDOM. Three stamps are offered once per day, one for the game being played and two for the opposite game. By collecting a certain number of stamps for a specific game, songs will be unlocked for the respective game. Part 1 was available from August 8, 2019, to September 30, 2019, and all songs are available by default in A20 PLUS. Part 2 started on July 7, 2020, and ended on September 7, 2020, and all songs are unlockables via EXTRA SAVIOR PLUS since March 8, 2021.

=== Dance Dance Revolution 20th Anniversary Grand Finale ===
The Dance Dance Revolution 20th Anniversary Grand Finale event began on September 5, 2019, and ended on December 31, 2019. By accumulating certain total numbers of score points, CHALLENGE charts for the Dance Dance Revolution 20th Anniversary songs could be unlocked.

=== Ichika no BEMANI Touhyou Senbatsusen 2019 ===
Ichika no BEMANI Touhyou Senbatsusen 2019 (いちかのBEMANI投票選抜戦2019) is a collaboration event between beatmania IIDX 26 Rootage, Dance Dance Revolution A20, DANCERUSH STARDOM, GITADORA EXCHAIN, jubeat festo, pop'n music peace, SOUND VOLTEX VIVID WAVE, and ノスタルジア Op.2. The event started on September 12, 2019, ended on October 14, 2019, and all songs were unlocked for everyone on June 25, 2020.

The MANIFEST aspect of the event focuses on the total number of votes submitted by BEMANI players. Depending on the number of votes for a specific BEMANI game, certain bonuses will be acted upon in the future.

=== Dance Dance Revolution Challenge Carnival ===
The Dance Dance Revolution Challenge Carnival event began on December 19, 2019, and ended on March 30, 2020, allowing players to unlock CHALLENGE charts for 無頼ック自己ライザー, タイガーランペイジ, 腐れ外道とチョコレゐト, ホーンテッド★メイドランチ, Our Soul, DOWNER & UPPER, and Prey by collecting a certain number of stamps. The Dance Dance Revolution Challenge Carnival Plus event for Dance Dance Revolution A20 Plus began on August 3, 2020, and ended on December 8, 2020, allowing players to unlock challenge charts for Shiny World, Sakura Sunrise, Pierce The Sky, バンブーソード・ガール, HyperTwist, Firestorm, ΩVERSOUL, び, and Lachryma《Re:Queen'M》 by collecting a certain number of stamps.

=== Floor Infection ===
The Floor Infection event between Dance Dance Revolution A20 (PLUS) and SOUND VOLTEX VIVID WAVE ran from February 27 to April 13, 2020, with retry from August 6 to September 7, 2020, and from November 26 to December 28, 2020. Similar to previous Floor Infection events, by playing SOUND VOLTEX, players can raise a meter, which upon reaching a certain level will unlock a new song in DDR. A total of 3 songs can be unlocked through this event. All past Floor Infection songs are available by default on February 27, 2020.

=== Course Trial ===
The Course Trial unlocking system allows players to unlock songs by clearing courses from the Course Trial folder. During the event duration, clearing the courses once will unlock new songs. Playing the course after the deadline will make it difficult for all players to unlock songs because EX-SCORE will be used for it.

=== Ichika no BEMANI Chou Janken Taikai 2020 ===
Ichika no BEMANI Chou Janken Taikai 2020 (いちかのBEMANI超じゃんけん大会2020) is an event held between beatmania IIDX 27 HEROIC VERSE, Dance Dance Revolution A20 (Plus), DANCERUSH STARDOM, GITADORA NEX+AGE, jubeat festo, pop'n music peace, SOUND VOLTEX VIVID WAVE, and ノスタルジア Op.3. The event started on May 7, 2020, and ended on August 31, 2020. All songs can be unlocked via e-amusement gate. All songs are moved to EXTRA SAVIOR PLUS on October 21, 2021.

=== Maishuu! Ichika no Chou BEMANI Rush 2020 ===
Maishuu! Ichika no Chou BEMANI Rush 2020 (毎週！いちかの超BEMANIラッシュ2020) is an event held between beatmania IIDX 27 HEROIC VERSE (unavailable in beatmania IIDX 28 BISTROVER due to release on October 28, 2020), Dance Dance Revolution A20 PLUS, DANCERUSH STARDOM, GITADORA NEX+AGE, jubeat festo, pop'n music peace, SOUND VOLTEX VIVID WAVE, and ノスタルジア Op.3. The event started on July 29, 2020, and ended on October 29, 2020. All songs can be unlocked via e-amusement gate (Nono's selection only), playing once from the origin game or 10 times from the destination game playing crossover songs (both lasts only from Ichika's selection). Only Sparkle Smilin' is unlocked itself. 狂水一華 requires all Ichika's selection songs to be unlocked first. Jetcoaster Windy requires 狂水一華 to be unlocked first. The event folder is moved to EXTRA SAVIOR PLUS on October 21, 2021.

=== BEMANI MusiQ FES ===
BEMANI MusiQ FES is an event held between QUIZ MAGIC ACADEMY Kibou no Toki (クイズマジックアカデミー 輝望の刻) and the BEMANI games beatmania IIDX 28 BISTROVER, DanceDanceRevolution A20 PLUS, DANCERUSH STARDOM, GITADORA NEX+AGE, jubeat festo, pop'n music peace, SOUND VOLTEX VIVID WAVE, and ノスタルジア Op.3. The event started on November 18, 2020 and ended on January 12, 2021.

=== Busou Shinki BC×BEMANI Kadou Kinen Campaign ===
Busou Shinki BC×BEMANI Kadou Kinen Campaign (武装神姫BC×BEMANI 稼働記念キャンペーン) is an event held between Busou Shinki BATTLE CONDUCTOR (武装神姫BC) and the BEMANI games beatmania IIDX 28 BISTROVER, DanceDanceRevolution A20 PLUS, DANCERUSH STARDOM, GITADORA NEX+AGE, jubeat festo, pop'n music 解明リドルズ, SOUND VOLTEX VIVID WAVE, and ノスタルジア Op.3. The event started on December 24, 2020 and ended on January 22, 2021. All songs can be unlocked playing Busou Shinki ARMORED PRINCESS BATTLE CONDUCTOR (武装神姫 アーマードプリンセス バトルコンダクター) once or 10 times from the destination game.

=== BPL Ouen Gakkyoku Kaikin Stamp Rally ===
BPL Ouen Gakkyoku Kaikin Stamp Rally (BPL応援 楽曲解禁スタンプラリー) is an event held between beatmania IIDX 28 BISTROVER, Dance Dance Revolution A20 PLUS, DANCERUSH STARDOM, GITADORA HIGH-VOLTAGE, jubeat festo, pop'n music 解明リドルズ, SOUND VOLTEX EXCEED GEAR, and ノスタルジア Op.3. Players can unlock songs (and items for beatmania IIDX) by accessing and logging into the official event website, and then obtaining a stamp by watching streams or archived videos of the BEMANI PRO LEAGUE 2021 via the official site. Note that you don't have to watch the entire video, you can close the video anytime and still be awarded with a stamp. The event started on June 18, 2021.

=== BEMANI 2021 Manatsu no Utagassen 5-Ban Shoubu ===
BEMANI 2021 Manatsu no Utagassen 5-Ban Shoubu (BEMANI 2021真夏の歌合戦5番勝負) is an event held between beatmania IIDX 28 BISTROVER, Dance Dance Revolution A20 PLUS, DANCERUSH STARDOM, GITADORA HIGH-VOLTAGE, jubeat festo, pop'n music 解明リドルズ, SOUND VOLTEX EXCEED GEAR, ノスタルジア Op.3, QUIZ MAGIC ACADEMY 夢幻の鏡界 and CARD CONNECT. The event started on July 27, 2021.

At each stage, a new song comes from each of two teams, TEAM RED and TEAM BLUE. Each song is added to four games, except for the third stage where both songs from this stage are added to all eight games. Players can unlock the event songs by obtaining "Yells" for playing any of participating games. Yells cannot be used for songs from the opposite team, but the bonus yells can be used for any teams. The team that obtains more yells becomes the winner and will show a new song at the end of the event.

=== DDR SELECTION ===
The DDR SELECTION category retains the features introduced in Dance Dance Revolution A.

The DDR SELECTION category has sub-folders based on different eras of the game, as well as EXTRA SAVIOR folder DDR 20th Anniversary songs and the Celebrations folder for brand-new songs. When playing a song under this category (marked in gold instead of white (a default song), yellow (an unlocked song), green (an EXTRA SAVIOR PLUS unlockable song) or red (an EXTRA EXCLUSIVE song)), the UI will change to match that of one of the games released in that period, including videos based on its original background animations (except for 4 songs of DDR (1st) and 2ndMIX which use their X3 VS 2ndMIX videos) or DDRMAX-EXTREME era's random movies (exc. for CANDY☆, which uses EXTREME videos instead of DDRMAX or MAX2 ones), DANGER animations, scoring changes (Can switch the scoring to SuperNOVA2 score or EX SCORE via operator's intervention), and background images (PARANOiA and DROP THE BOMB(SyS.F. Mix) have updated backgrounds) or banners, if applicable.

Selecting any of two DDR 20th Anniversary songs folders or other category retain the original UI. All options if the user plays with DDR (1st) UI are forced to FLAT and CLASSIC. SCREEN FILTER and GUIDE LINE are disabled. Only SPEED, TURN, Assist and LIFE GAUGE options are changed by the user.

== Release ==
=== 20th Anniversary Edition (Gold) ===
Dance Dance Revolution A20 was released on golden cabinets on March 20, 2019, in Japan. The release date was first confirmed by a flyer at a Japanese Round One Entertainment arcade on March 3, 2019. The flyer announced that the golden cabinets serve as a timed exclusive on these new cabinets, while upgrade kits released later. The game features revivals of classic licensed songs, NONSTOP and CLASS courses, and new Golden League events. Legend Licenses, Golden League, and CLASS courses are available for golden cabinets only; however, the phase 11 of the Golden League cannot demote all players due to COVID-19 outbreak. New cabinets feature a 55" monitor at 1080p; however, the game operates at 720p.

On May 15, 2019, Dance Dance Revolution A20 was imported in the United States at Round One. It ran on the Japanese software until September 24, 2019, when Round One implemented the localized software build in Dance Dance Revolution A20 cabs in the same month that Round One's competitor Dave & Buster's received the localization software build for its Dance Dance Revolution A cabs. On May 29, 2019, Round One confirmed that all of its American locations will receive A20 in the form of imported golden cabinets. This initially introduced the game to 32 locations at the time of release, most of which also feature a localized version of Dance Dance Revolution A. While players are free to select their own location on e-Amusement, the imported A20 cabinets are registered to the Osaka Prefecture in Japan, rather than the player's state.

=== Upgrade Kits (Blue) ===
On June 2, 2019, Dave & Buster's vice president Kevin Bachus confirmed that Dance Dance Revolution A20 is receiving a localized software build in North America, which can be installed on existing white cabinets in Canada and the USA. Bachus also announced that his company is considering the purchase of new cabinets. Software upgrades for the region were released on September 24, 2019, except for the state of Hawaii, which received a localized release on June 19, 2020. This North American release is unique for being a physical hardware upgrade kit, requiring a new license key and USB flash drive installation to upgrade the game software. This upgrade kit is only compatible with Dance Dance Revolution A cabinets, and the marquee from A remains unchanged. The Hawaiian and Asian song lists are identical, while continental North America features a smaller song list.

Upgrade kits for older cabinets were released on July 24, 2019, in Japan and Asia, except for South Korea, which received a localized release on August 1, 2019. The game operates at 720p on both X and white cabinets, and at 480p on legacy cabinets.

=== Dance Dance Revolution A20 Plus ===
Dance Dance Revolution A20 Plus is an expansion pack available at no charge. It was released on July 1, 2020, to online 20th Anniversary Edition cabinets, and on July 6, 2020, to other A20 online cabinets. Konami marketed this release with a Twitter countdown teaser campaign from June 26 to 30, 2020. It is the third Plus release in the Dance Dance Revolution series, following the releases of Dance Dance Revolution 3rdMix Plus on June 21, 2000, and 4thMix Plus on December 28, 2000. Compared to previous Plus releases, A20 Plus has a longer support cycle and a larger catalogue of new songs.

Currently, A20 Plus features 105 new songs in 20th Anniversary cabinets in Japan, 95 new songs in upgrade kits in Asia and Hawaii, and 78 new songs in North America. On all cabinets, A20 Plus removes a total of 21 songs: 19 licenses from Dance Dance Revolution A, 回レ！雪月花 from the Dance Dance Revolution (2013), and only my railgun from Dance Dance Revolution X2.

At launch, A20 Plus included 14 new songs and 4 new courses. On 20th Anniversary cabinets, this update refreshed the 11 Dan courses. It included songs on Difficult play, which is easier than Expert and Challenge play, for the first time in some Dan courses.

=== Dance Dance Revolution A3 ===
Dance Dance Revolution A3
- Developers: Konami, Bemani
- Publisher: Konami
- Series: Dance Dance Revolution
- Platform: Arcade
- Release: JP/US: March 17, 2022; (golden cabinets): US: August 19, 2023; (upgrade kits)
- Genres: Music, exercise
- Modes: Single-player, multiplayer
- Arcade system: Bemani PC Type 4, Type 5 or ADE-704A (ADE-6291 for golden cabinets only)

Dance Dance Revolution A3 (pronounced Ace Three) is the 18th installment of the Dance Dance Revolution arcade series in Japan, and the sequel to Dance Dance Revolution A20 Plus. The game was released as an update on golden cabinets on March 17, 2022, for Japanese arcades and Round1 locations in the United States. An upgrade for older cabinets was released in Asia (including Japan, South Korea, and several other countries), Australasia, and the United States (Hawaii only) on June 22, 2022. Round1 USA upgraded its non-golden A20 Plus cabinets to A3 on August 19, 2023,

This version now has the ability for players to switch between Single and Double gameplay styles on the same credit, done by pressing 3 on the numeric keypad. Additionally, the "Premium Play" feature for 20th anniversary cabinets, once limited to users of the PASELI digital currency service in Japan, is now available in the United States. Due to style switches, the selected play style is now indicated on the MUSIC SELECT and TOTAL RESULT screens. Additionally, all 4-song courses prior to DDR A20 PLUS have been removed.

Dance Dance Revolution A3 featured 10 new songs at launch, for a total of 1,009. As of 5 January 2024, an additional 185 songs were added to the game and 10 licenses were removed, bringing the song total to 1,194. On May 19, 2022, "Megalovania" by Toby Fox was added to the game. The song, which originates from the 2015 video game Undertale, has since been featured in several video games, including Gitadora High-Voltage by Konami on August 10, 2022, and StepManiaX by Step Revolution on December 20, 2020. On November 4, 2022, two songs by Porter Robinson from his album Nurture were added to DDR A3, along with their music videos: "Look at the Sky" and "Something Comforting". This was followed up with the song "Musician" and its music video, also from the album Nurture, being added to the game on February 13, 2023.

Dance Dance Revolution A3 was not released at Dave & Buster's, which has 72 locations featuring Dance Dance Revolution A20 Plus as of May 2025. As a result, the game lacked an official release in several states and Canada.

== Music ==
Dance Dance Revolution A20 features 88 new songs, for a total of 897 songs. Among the new songs, 16 are exclusive to golden cabinets, while another 3 are exclusive to Asia and Hawaii. Another 4 songs from Dance Dance Revolution A are unavailable for online play in continental North America. These songs are exclusive to Asia, Hawaii, Local Mode and Maintenance Mode.

Dance Dance Revolution A20 Plus features 106 new songs, for a total of 982. Among the new songs, 10 are exclusive to golden cabinets, while another 17 are exclusive to Asia and Hawaii. The 4 restricted songs from Dance Dance Revolution A are now available in North America, for online and offline play. On all cabinets, A20 Plus removes a total of 21 songs from prior releases.

== Courses ==
=== Nonstop Courses ===
Course (コースから題ぶ) mode is reintroduced in Dance Dance Revolution A20 for the first time since Dance Dance Revolution X3 vs. 2ndMix. Similar to Dancing Stage EuroMix, A20 places course folders in the main music selection screen, and courses display once it is selected. A20 offered six courses at launch, including four which are available on all machines, and another which was removed from A20 Plus on March 7, 2022. These courses and four brand new courses were featured in A20 Plus at launch, along with 19 courses added over time with online updates, for a total of 29 courses.

Dance Dance Revolution A20

Nonstop	Songs
FIRST 💛	1. "HAVE YOU NEVER BEEN MELLOW (20th Anniversary Mix)"
FIRST 💛	2. "MAKE IT BETTER"
FIRST 💛	3. "TRIP MACHINE"
FIRST 💛	4. "PARANOiA"
TWENTY	1. "This Beat Is....."
TWENTY	2. "Waiting"
TWENTY	3. "Dead Heat"
TWENTY	4. "Neverland"
Bounce	1. "Slip Out (bounce in beat mix)"
Bounce	2. "Fly far bounce"
Bounce	3. "on the bounce"
Bounce	4. "Drop The Bounce"
PASSION	1. "Heatstroke"
PASSION	2. "La Señorita"
PASSION	3. "Seta Para Cima↑↑"
PASSION	4. "Spanish Snowy Dance"
PLANET	1. "SEXY PLANET"
PLANET	2. "Starry Sky"
PLANET	3. "Saturn"
PLANET	4. "Procyon"
HARD DANCE 🌏	1. "Music In The Rhythm"
HARD DANCE 🌏	2. "The Light"
HARD DANCE 🌏	3. "RISING FIRE HAWK"
HARD DANCE 🌏	4. "District of the Shadows"
💛 This course and its first song are only available on golden cabinets, which are exclusive to Asia and the United States. 🌏 This course and its second song were removed on March 7, 2022. Previously, this content was limited to Asia and Australasia, based on licensing conditions.

Dance Dance Revolution A20 Plus

Nonstop	Songs
ONE HALF	1. "DeStRuCtIvE FoRcE"
ONE HALF	2. "FUNKY SUMMER BEACH"
ONE HALF	3. "天空の華"
ONE HALF	4. "In the past"
HYPER	1. "HYPER EUROBEAT"
HYPER	2. "天上の星 ～黎明記～"
HYPER	3. "Hyper Bomb"
HYPER	4. "HyperTwist"
☆☆☆☆	1. "ちゅ～いん☆バニー"
☆☆☆☆	2. "Right on time (Ryu☆Remix)"
☆☆☆☆	3. "恋する☆宇宙戦争っ!!"
☆☆☆☆	4. "HAPPY☆ANGEL"
Intelligence	1. "Abyss"
Intelligence	2. "Theory of Eternity"
Intelligence	3. "nightbird lost wing"
Intelligence	4. "ZETA～素数の世界と超越者～"
STRANGE	1. "WILD RUSH"
STRANGE	2. "Mythomane"
STRANGE	3. "STEP MACHINE"
STRANGE	4. "Bang Pad(Werk Mix)"
REMIXES	1. "Dance Celebration (System 7 Remix)"
REMIXES	2. "Poseidon (kors k mix)"
REMIXES	3. "Healing Vision ～Angelic mix～"
REMIXES	4. "Inner Spirit -GIGA HiTECH MIX-"
RAVE	1. "DYNAMITE RAVE"
RAVE	2. "PUNISHER"
RAVE	3. "SUPER SAMURAI"
RAVE	4. "Rave Accelerator"
DIVA	1. "Din Don Dan"
DIVA	2. "Tell me what to do"
DIVA	3. "ALGORITHM"
DIVA	4. "Twinkle Wonderland"
AGGRESSIVE	1. "TRIP MACHINE survivor"
AGGRESSIVE	2. "GRADIUSIC CYBER ～AMD G5 MIX～"
AGGRESSIVE	3. "NEPHILIM DELTA"
AGGRESSIVE	4. "Vertigo"
SNOW WHITE	1. "ever snow"
SNOW WHITE	2. "snow prism"
SNOW WHITE	3. "Starlight Fantasia"
SNOW WHITE	4. "梅雪夜"
PARTY ANTHEMS	1. "Back In Your Arms"
PARTY ANTHEMS	2. "Yeah! Yeah!"
PARTY ANTHEMS	3. "Somehow You Found Me"
PARTY ANTHEMS	4. "PARTY ALL NIGHT(DJ KEN-BOW MIX)"
FANTASY	1. "Towards the TOWER"
FANTASY	2. "StrayedCatz"
FANTASY	3. "Xepher"
FANTASY	4. "彼方のリフレシア"
NIGHT DRIVE	1. "BRILLIANT 2U"
NIGHT DRIVE	2. "Wicked Plastik"
NIGHT DRIVE	3. "Far east nightbird kors k Remix -DDR edit ver-"
NIGHT DRIVE	4. "Next Phase"
FUTURE	1. "Star Gate Heaven (FUTURE LOVE Mix)"
FUTURE	2. "Star Trail"
FUTURE	3. "未来（ダ）FUTURE"
FUTURE	4. "If"
JUST = 135	1. "INTO YOUR HEART (Ruffage remix)"
JUST = 135	2. "Dance Partay"
JUST = 135	3. "Rejoin"
JUST = 135	4. "Taking It To The Sky (PLUS step)"
TRIBAL	1. "Tribe"
TRIBAL	2. "Gamelan de Couple"
TRIBAL	3. "AFRONOVA"
TRIBAL	4. "Jucunda Memoria"
SWEETS HOPPING	1. "CHOCOLATE PHILOSOPHY"
SWEETS HOPPING	2. "LOVE IS ORANGE"
SWEETS HOPPING	3. "Jam & Marmalade"
SWEETS HOPPING	4. "Sweet Clock"
MACHINE	1. "I/O"
MACHINE	2. "Programmed Universe"
MACHINE	3. "Dream Machine"
MACHINE	4. "AI"
STELLA	1. "My Only Shining Star"
STELLA	2. "Cosmic Hurricane"
STELLA	3. "十二星座の聖域"
STELLA	4. "ほしのつくりかた"
NEW STRADE	1. "Freeway Shuffle"
NEW STRADE	2. "Flourish"
NEW STRADE	3. "New Gravity"
NEW STRADE	4. "モノクロモーメント"
KA・TA・KA・NA YEAH!	1. "カゲロウ"
KA・TA・KA・NA YEAH!	2. "サナ・モレッテ・ネ・エンテ"
KA・TA・KA・NA YEAH!	3. "パ→ピ→プ→Yeah!"
KA・TA・KA・NA YEAH!	4. "パピポペピプペパ"
WITHSTAND	1. "Don't Stop!～AMD 2nd MIX～"
WITHSTAND	2. "Poseidon"
WITHSTAND	3. "MAXIMIZER"
WITHSTAND	4. "SCHWARZSCHILD FIELD"
Let's DANCE!	1. "Dance Floor"
Let's DANCE!	2. "DANCE ALL NIGHT (DDR EDITION)"
Let's DANCE!	3. "阿波おどり -Awaodori- やっぱり踊りはやめられない"
Let's DANCE!	4. "私をディスコに連れてって TOKYO"

=== Dan Courses ===
Dan (段位認定, Dan Inintei, also known as CLASS) mode is a new feature in Dance Dance Revolution A20, similar to the Beatmania IIDX series and Dance Dance Revolution X's Dance Drill Course mode. They are a series of courses ranked so that each course is harder than the last. Unlike the Beatmania IIDX series though, the starting level in DanceDanceRevolution is 1st Dan (初段). Since July 25, 2019, Dan courses allow for short breaks in-between songs, referred to as "Break Time". Dan courses are exclusive for golden cabinets. Courses marked in bronze requires bronze class in the golden league, in silver requires silver class and in gold requires gold class.

Dance Dance Revolution A20

Dan (段位認定)	SINGLE	DOUBLE
1st Dan (初段)	1. "HIGHER"	1. "Slip Out"
1st Dan (初段)	2. "Shine"	2. "Fever"
1st Dan (初段)	3. "IN THE ZONE"	3. "STILL IN MY HEART"
1st Dan (初段)	4. "B4U"	4. "think ya better D"
2nd Dan (二段) 🔒	1. "Do The Evolution"	1. "escape"
2nd Dan (二段) 🔒	2. "Flourish"	2. "south"
2nd Dan (二段) 🔒	3. "Heatstroke"	3. "DANCE ALL NIGHT (DDR EDITION)"
2nd Dan (二段) 🔒	4. "will"	4. "INTO YOUR HEART (Ruffage remix)"
3rd Dan (三段) 🔒	1. "Decade"	1. "MAKE IT BETTER (So-REAL Mix)"
3rd Dan (三段) 🔒	2. "A Geisha's Dream"	2. "oarfish"
3rd Dan (三段) 🔒	3. "In The Breeze"	3. "ルミナスデイズ"
3rd Dan (三段) 🔒	4. "Theory of Eternity"	4. "Beautiful Dream"
4th Dan (四段) 🔒	1. "Beautiful Dream"	1. "Desert Journey"
4th Dan (四段) 🔒	2. "DYNAMITE RAVE"	2. "stoic (EXTREME version)"
4th Dan (四段) 🔒	3. "TECH-NOID"	3. "heron"
4th Dan (四段) 🔒	4. "S・A・G・A"	4. "PARANOIA EVOLUTION"
5th Dan (五段) 🔒	1. "You are a Star"	1. "Do The Evolution"
5th Dan (五段) 🔒	2. "十二星座の聖域"	2. "DROP OUT"
5th Dan (五段) 🔒	3. "sakura storm"	3. "ALGORITHM"
5th Dan (五段) 🔒	4. "Diamond Night"	4. "Healing Vision ～Angelic mix～"
6th Dan (六段) 🔒	1. "on the bounce"	1. "siberite"
6th Dan (六段) 🔒	2. "AM-3P ("CHAOS" Special)"	2. "Horatio"
6th Dan (六段) 🔒	3. "Pierce The Sky"	3. "The Least 100sec"
6th Dan (六段) 🔒	4. "MAX 300"	4. "エンドルフィン"
7th Dan (七段) 🔒	1. "Nostalgia Is Lost"	1. "SILVER☆DREAM"
7th Dan (七段) 🔒	2. "Amalgamation"	2. "IMANOGUILTS"
7th Dan (七段) 🔒	3. "The legend of MAX"	3. "PARANOIA survivor MAX"
7th Dan (七段) 🔒	4. "True Blue"	4. "SUPER SAMURAI"
8th Dan (八段) 🔒	1. "Monkey Business"	1. "TRIP MACHINE PhoeniX"
8th Dan (八段) 🔒	2. "嘆きの樹"	2. "Arrabbiata"
8th Dan (八段) 🔒	3. "PARANOIA survivor MAX"	3. "Truare!"
8th Dan (八段) 🔒	4. "POSSESSION"	4. "ÆTHER"
9th Dan (九段) 🔒	1. "Anti-Matter"	1. "New Century"
9th Dan (九段) 🔒	2. "Fascination MAXX"	2. "SABER WING (Akira Ishihara Headshot mix)"
9th Dan (九段) 🔒	3. "Idola"	3. "RЁVOLUTIФN"
9th Dan (九段) 🔒	4. "Astrogazer"	4. "IX"
10th Dan (十段) 🔒	1. "Come to Life"	1. "Healing-D-Vision"
10th Dan (十段) 🔒	2. "New Decade"	2. "PARANOiA ~HADES~"
10th Dan (十段) 🔒	3. "Tohoku EVOLVED"	3. "888"
10th Dan (十段) 🔒	4. "PARANOiA Revolution"	
Kaiden (皆伝) 🔒	1. "EGOISM 440"	1. "Valkyrie Dimension"
Kaiden (皆伝) 🔒	2. "Over the "period""	2. "POSSESSION"
Kaiden (皆伝) 🔒	3. "Valkyrie Dimension"	3. "Over the "period""
Kaiden (皆伝) 🔒	4. "ENDYMION"	4. "EGOISM 440"

Dance Dance Revolution A20 Plus

Dan (段位認定)	SINGLE	DOUBLE
1st Dan (初段)	1. "FUJIMORI -祭- FESTIVAL"	1. "Yeah! Yeah!"
1st Dan (初段)	2. "Sweet Rain"	2. "HANDS UP IN THE AIR"
1st Dan (初段)	3. "TRIP MACHINE"	3. "Dreamin'"
1st Dan (初段)	4. "AWAKE"	4. "Hopeful"
2nd Dan (二段) 🔒	1. "BURNIN' THE FLOOR"	1. "Crazy Control"
2nd Dan (二段) 🔒	2. "Find The Way"	2. "Take A Step Forward"
2nd Dan (二段) 🔒	3. "All My Love"	3. "Dance Floor"
2nd Dan (二段) 🔒	4. "Children of the Beat"	4. "TWINKLE♡HEART"
3rd Dan (三段) 🔒	1. "Fly Away"	1. "Another Phase"
3rd Dan (三段) 🔒	2. "アルストロメリア (walk with you remix)"	2. "ヤマトなでなで♡かぐや姫"
3rd Dan (三段) 🔒	3. "零 - ZERO -"	3. "ever snow"
3rd Dan (三段) 🔒	4. "KISS KISS KISS 秋葉工房 MIX"	4. "Beautiful Dream"
4th Dan (四段) 🔒	1. "Tell me what to do"	1. "KISS KISS KISS 秋葉工房 MIX"
4th Dan (四段) 🔒	2. "Freeze"	2. "TRIP MACHINE CLIMAX"
4th Dan (四段) 🔒	3. "sync (EXTREME versrion)"	3. "CRAZY♥LOVE"
4th Dan (四段) 🔒	4. "Angelic Jelly"	4. "Engraved Mark"
5th Dan (五段) 🔒	1. "AA"	1. "三毛猫ロック"
5th Dan (五段) 🔒	2. "Condor"	
5th Dan (五段) 🔒	3. "Somehow You Found Me"	3. "A"
5th Dan (五段) 🔒	4. "Daily Lunch Special"	4. "RЁVOLUTIФN"
6th Dan (六段) 🔒	1. "Ishtar"	1. "朧"
6th Dan (六段) 🔒	2. "不沈艦CANDY"	2. "Horatio"
6th Dan (六段) 🔒	3. "F4SH10N"	3. "大見解"
6th Dan (六段) 🔒	4. "MAX 300"	4. "PARANOIA survivor"
7th Dan (七段) 🔒	1. "TRIP MACHINE PhoeniX"	1. "ZEPHYRANTHES"
7th Dan (七段) 🔒	2. "天空の華"	2. "Windy Fairy"
7th Dan (七段) 🔒	3. "ZEPHYRANTHES"	3. "Healing-D-Vision"
7th Dan (七段) 🔒	4. "MAXX UNLIMITED"	4. "Cosy Catastrophe"
8th Dan (八段) 🔒	1. "I'm so Happy"	1. "隅田川夏恋歌"
8th Dan (八段) 🔒	2. "海神"	2. "STULTI"
8th Dan (八段) 🔒	3. "Vanquish The Ghost"	3. "Life is beautiful"
8th Dan (八段) 🔒	4. "The legend of MAX(X-Special)"	4. "MAX 300 (Super-Max-Me Mix)"
9th Dan (九段) 🔒	1. "恋する☆宇宙戦争っ!!"	1. "Magnetic"
9th Dan (九段) 🔒	2. "New Decade"	2. "Triple Counter"
9th Dan (九段) 🔒	3. "Spanish Snowy Dance"	3. "New Decade"
9th Dan (九段) 🔒	4. "Fascination MAXX"	4. "PARANOiA Revolution"
10th Dan (十段) 🔒	1. "PARANOiA ～HADES～"	1. "シュレーディンガーの猫"
10th Dan (十段) 🔒	2. "888"	2. "ΔMAX"
10th Dan (十段) 🔒	3. "PARANOiA Revolution"	3. "Come to Life"
10th Dan (十段) 🔒	4. "EGOISM 440"	4. "Pluto Relinquish"
Kaiden (皆伝) 🔒	1. "MAX 360"	1. "TRIP MACHINE EVOLUTION"
Kaiden (皆伝) 🔒	2. "Over The "Period""	2. "ENDYMION"
Kaiden (皆伝) 🔒	3. "Valkyrie dimension"	
Kaiden (皆伝) 🔒	4. "ENDYMION"	4. "POSSESSION"
