= Dance Dance Revolution (2013 video game) =

2013 video game

- Developers: Konami, Bemani
- Publisher: Konami
- Series: Dance Dance Revolution
- Platform: Arcade
- Release: 2013 Edition: JP: March 14, 2013; AS: March 21, 2013; KR: February 7, 2014; 2014 Edition: JP: May 12, 2014; AS/KR: July 22, 2014
- Genres: Music, exercise
- Modes: Single-player, multiplayer
- Arcade system: Bemani PC Type 4 (Windows XP Embedded)

Dance Dance Revolution (ダンスダンスレボリューション, DansuDansuReboryūshon) (DDR) is a music video game, the 14th installment of the Dance Dance Revolution series, and the sequel to Dance Dance Revolution X3 vs. 2ndMix. The game was revealed by Konami on October 24, 2012. Public beta testing commenced on October 26, 2012. It was released in Japan on March 14 and 21, 2013 for dedicated cabinets and upgrade kits, respectively, and in Asia on March 21, 2013. A limited test release occurred at select locations in the United States, beginning on August 4, 2015.

After the release of Dance Dance Revolution in 2014, which is the 15th installment, it was succeeded by Dance Dance Revolution A in 2016.

== Development ==
The game was first revealed by Konami on October 24, 2012 through DDR Staff Blog, announcing that the first location test will be held on October 26, 2012 in Akihabara, Tokyo. Shortly after the announcement, the blog revealed several new features being tested in the location test, including the new "TAG Play" (which temporarily replaced Versus Play in the location test), the addition of "Good Full Combo", and other changes. The game's new white cabinet sports an increased monitor size, along with a general redesign of the cabinet and pads.

== Features ==
The cabinet design for the game is changed to a white cabinet, with increased monitor size from 37 inches (diagonally) to 42 inches and space for players to put personal items.

Aside from aesthetic changes, the game also features various updates to both gameplay and interface. A new mode, called "TAG Play", is added. The mode is essentially the same as Versus Play, except that the game rewards the two players that hit arrows on both pads at the same time with "Synchro-Bonus" points. While the player's individual scores are unaffected, these points are tallied to form the "Team Score". Players do not need to select the same difficulties for this to work. In addition, "GOOD" judgment no longer breaks the player's combo, instead counting towards it, similar to Dance Dance Revolution. The full combo splash with GOOD is also colored blue and the results screen awards the player with blue circle with a simple "Full Combo" written on it. However, the game no longer has the selection of "Happy" and "Pro" modes and replaced on the 2014 edition by "Standard Mode" and "PASELI"; instead, the game features all songs selectable normally (without locked songs on STANDARD MODE). The continuous-based play Course Mode has also been removed.

The game's initial 2013 interface is mainly based on the Cover Flow design like the previous two games. Song selection is also being simplified to provide easier access for new players to browse, such as the separation of each player's Groove Radar and difficulty table. The game primarily features blue and pink colors (representing the traditional colors for Player 1 and 2) mixed with white abstract motifs. The 2014 update, released on May 12, 2014, significantly alters the interface. The song selection is brought downward and the left and right sides of the song's jacket store five tabs, containing difficulty selection, groove radar, scores, Yuniver Hills unlocks and Boss-On-Parade medals (or Replicant-D-Ignition Nitros). Selecting difficulty is now done after the player choose the song, although the game still allows the player to view the difficulties from the song select screen.

The game supports the "e-AMUSEMENT Participation" system also used by recent BEMANI games. In addition to delivering updated content and allowing players to save scores and other data, this system enables Konami to take a cut of the credits entered into each machine. Thus, the game requires connection to the e-AMUSEMENT service to boot, although the game continues to function if the service is interrupted after the game has booted. PASELI service, initially introduced in Dance Dance Revolution X2 is usable in the game. Players can use the e-money system to pay credits for the game instead of using coins. Using the PASELI also benefits the players, among them options to enable certain features that otherwise are not accessible to non-premium users. Starting on May 12, 2014, PASELI is also the only way to access Extra Stage. For connected e-Amuse machines outside of the Japan territory, the PASELI service is replaced with "Premium Mode". This allows players to access special gameplay events and features normally blocked behind the PASELI paywall. PREMIUM MODE can be accessed by adding more credits (set by the arcade operator) during the start of a game session.

== Events ==
=== Extra Stages and EXTRA ATTACK ===
The game retains the Extra Stage system from previous games, which rewards players with an additional stage by fulfilling certain requirements. Players are required to obtain 9 stars decided by the player's grades as in DDR X3 vs 2ndMix. Extra Stage is played with a forced Battery dance meter containing 4 lives. Obtaining a step judgment of "MISS" or "N.G." depletes one life on the player's battery; depleting all four lives will fail the stage. While Extra Stage is initially accessible to all players, starting on the major update on May 12, 2014, Extra Stage is only accessible for premium users.

To celebrate the birthday of the game's sound director, Yasuhiro Taguchi (better known as TAG), three new Extra Stage songs were added on March 25, 2014. Clearing songs made by TAG will cause flower icons to appear in the song jackets, and the three new songs, in order: esrev:eR, ÆTHER, and SABER WING (satellite silhouette remix) will be made available.

Starting in May 2014, if any player earned an Extra Stage, can access a new music folder, Extra Attack, containing new songs. A "Survived Bonus" gauge can be filled by playing these songs; passing the songs will unlock the stepchart the player played on. Challenge stepcharts for several songs are also available under an additional folder, Oni no Extra Attack (鬼のEXTRA ATTACK) accessible for a limited period from time to time, which forces players to play with Sudden Death dance meter (scoring a single "MISS" or "N.G." will immediately end the game). This event ends on December 17, 2015 & certain songs are unlocked for regular play while the other part are still in this folder.

A bug in the game caused the post-Extra Stage, Encore Extra Stage to be made available after an October 2, 2013 update of the game, which was not implemented due to the revenue-sharing system. The bug allowed players who score AA or higher in Blew My Mind on Expert to access Another Phase on Expert, although the song is already accessible normally. It was rectified in an October 8, 2013 update, and Encore Extra Stage is once more inaccessible.

=== Private BEMANI Academy ===
The first BEMANI-wide event, Private BEMANI Academy (私立BEMANI学園, Shiritsu BEMANI Gakuen) started on April 24, 2013 and ended on December 19, 2013. Among the BEMANI games that participate in the event other than DDR include beatmaniaIIDX, pop'n music, GITADORA, jubeat, and REFLEC BEAT. In this school-themed event, players needed to play each of the six BEMANI games to fill the friendship meters between eighteen BEMANI artists that were grouped into two each. Obtaining 100% friendship with a group would unlock a collaboration song on all games. What game the player played would also influence the increasing rate of the meter; for example, playing DDR would boost the rate to unlock the song by TAG and U1-ASAMi (Synergy for Angels) by 5 times, but it would also decrease the rate to unlock the song by 猫叉Master+ (Nekomata Master+) and L.E.D. (GAIA) by half. In addition, while not fully participating in the event, playing Dance Evolution ARCADE, Sound Voltex, and Quiz Magic Academy Kenja no Tobira Season2 would also help boost the friendship meter. After unlocking all nine collaboration songs, players could befriend dj TAKA and DJ YOSHITAKA to unlock the last song, Elemental Creation.

=== jubeat・GITADORA・DDR's Triple Journey ===
Triple Journey, a collaboration event between DDR, jubeat, and GITADORA started on August 1, 2013 and ended on September 2, 2013, coinciding with a related BEMANI event, Kupuro Mimi-Nyami Pastel-kun no Minnade Uchū Sensō. In this event, for every day in the month of August, players could check the event's e-Amusement GATE website to receive mails that contain new songs. The first day of the event gave a new song (sola) to all games. From then on, each game alternated on receiving the mails that contain crossover songs from the others; all games would receive a total of 13 songs by the end of the event. Eventually the event culminated on the last day which gave another new song (Triple Journey) to all games.

=== Nettou! BEMANI Stadium ===
The second BEMANI-wide event, Nettou! BEMANI Stadium (熱闘！BEMANIスタジアム, Nettō BEMANI Stadium) started on December 19, 2013 and ended on July 23, 2014. All games participating in Private BEMANI Academy returned to participate in this event again, with SOUND VOLTEX now fully participating in the event and also receive the new songs; newcomer include ミライダガッキ FutureTomTom. In this event, players could collect three baseball cards with emblem based on various BEMANI artists and characters by playing each game. These baseball cards could then be trained to increase its skill, then used to battle other players in baseball tournaments, which required entry tickets (received by playing any of the nine games). Winning the games unlocked new songs for play. The event is split into two parts, with the game Steel Chronicle VICTROOPERS also joining the event in the second part. After unlocking all songs, players could participate in the final tournament, which unlocked the song IX for play. While this event ends, all songs can unlock via EXTRA ATTACK.

=== Floor Infection ===
The 10th floor infection event between DDR and SOUND VOLTEX II -infinite infection- (and III -Gravity Wars-) ran from June 26 to July 10, 2014, with additional rerun from July 30 to August 6, 2014. Similar to previous Floor Infection events, by playing SOUND VOLTEX, players can raise a meter, which upon reaching a certain level will unlock a new song in DDR. A total of 3 songs can be unlocked through this event.

=== Hakken! Yomigaetta BEMANI Iseki ===
The third BEMANI-wide event, Hakken! Yomigaetta BEMANI Iseki (発見！よみがえったBEMANI遺跡) or "Discover! BEMANI Ruins" started on July 24, 2014. The participating games other than DDR are beatmaniaIIDX, pop'n music, GITADORA, jubeat, REFLEC BEAT, SOUND VOLTEX, Dance Evolution ARCADE, ミライダガッキ FutureTomTom, and BeatStream. In it, players can collect stones by playing each of the BEMANI games participating to build pyramids divided into six parts, all of which unlock new crossover songs. All games have their own pyramids with the exception of SOUND VOLTEX, Dance Evolution, and BeatStream, which can be played to boost the rate to unlock songs on other games.

In addition, there are three clocks containing three all-new collaboration songs. Players from all of Japan can fill these clocks; upon completing one, a new song will be available for everyone for a single day.

On July 23, 2015, all songs can unlock via EXTRA ATTACK folder.

=== Boss On Parade ===
The Boss On Parade event was started on January 22, 2015. In the event, five crossover songs from other Bemani games are available for unlock by collecting medals obtained by clearing a specific set of songs. These songs are usually tied to the artist credited for the crossover songs, tied to the original games they appear in, or else have an aesthetic connection (such as songs titled with themes relating around fire and heat being required to unlock クリムゾンゲイト (Crimson Gate)). Players may not clear the same song repeatedly to obtain the medals. By unlocking all five songs, players are able to unlock a new song, Truare!. As of February 16, 2015, the condition to unlock each song is relaxed; clearing other songs not eligible nets players with fragments of the medals, and players can play the eligible songs repeatedly to earn the medals.

This event ends on December 24, 2015 & all these songs are unlocked for regular play.

=== Replicant D-Ignition ===
The continuation of "Replicant D-Action" event from DDR X2, this event, available since March 5, 2015, once again allowed players to unlock a new folder containing six new boss songs. This time, instead of fulfilling a different set of objectives, players simply had to fill song meters (represented by tubes) which were presented at the end of a game credit. The event was directly connected with the "Boss On Parade" event and required players to clear Truare! first. One could choose to pick one out of 5 nitro tubes (and thus five songs) to fill; once it is full, players gained access to the D-Ignition folder during Extra Stage, which had a different interface and system music. Once players chose to enter, they might not exit back to the regular song selection screen.

By scoring AA or higher on Expert in one of the five songs, players would earn a colored orb. Having all five orbs unlocked a sixth song, EGOISM 440. Selecting this song immediately discarded all orbs; regardless if players passed or failed this song, they would have to earn all orbs to unlock the song again. If players managed to score AA or higher in EGOISM 440 on Expert, they could access the Encore Extra Stage, MAX. (period) on Expert with 1.5x speed, Reverse scroll, and Risky (scoring one MISS or N.G. immediately fails the stage) options turned on. As with the Encore Extra Stage of "Replicant D-Action", players immediately played the stage following a short cinematic; no time was allowed to change options.

The second phase of the event was started on March 26, 2015, which was accessible for players who managed to pass Encore Extra Stage. Players could collect another round of colored orbs which allows access to MAX. (period) in Extra Stage in all difficulties, including Challenge (a different stepchart from the one found in Dance Dance Revolution Extreme). In the same vein as EGOISM 440, choosing the song discarded all orbs. If players managed to score AA or higher in MAX. (period) on Challenge, they were granted access to Encore Extra Stage, Over The "Period" on Difficult with all prior Cut options disabled and a special Risky Dance meter: scoring GREAT, GOOD, MISS, or N.G will make you fail the stage.

As of April 9, 2015, conditions for the event had been lowered; for the first phase, players could play EGOISM 440 on Difficult to access MAX. (period) on Difficult also, while in the second phase, playing MAX. (period) on Expert would net access to Over The "Period" on Basic.

As of May 1, 2015, conditions for the event had been even lowered in the second phase; Clearing MAX. (period) on Difficult as the Extra Stage led to Over The "Period" being played on Beginner as the Encore Extra Stage. However, on Double Play, where Beginner was not available, Over The "Period" would be played on Basic instead.

As of July 2, 2015, conditions for the event had been even lowered in the second phase; Clearing MAX. (period) on Basic as the Extra Stage led to Over The "Period" being played on Beginner as the Encore Extra Stage. However, on Double Play, where Beginner was not available, Over The "Period" would be played on Basic instead.

As of August 6, 2015, all 8 songs can be unlocked via EXTRA ATTACK. Conditions like Truare! or 5 nitros are still exist, though but exist changed methods: For the first phase, players could play EGOISM 440 on Expert to access MAX. (period), while in the second phase, unlocking MAX. (period) on Expert to access Over The "Period", for the third phase, unlocking Over The "Period" on Expert to access MAX. (period) on Challenge and finally for the fourth phase, unlocking MAX. (period) on Challenge as the Extra Stage led to EGOISM 440 being played on Challenge at the next play.

This event ends on December 24, 2015 & all these songs are unlocked for regular play. All players can access to Over The "Period" on Challenge as Extra Stage, and cannot unlocked via EXTRA ATTACK.

=== BEMANI Summer Diary 2015 ===
The fourth BEMANI-wide event, BEMANI Summer Diary 2015, was started on July 23, 2015 and ended on October 26, 2015. The goal for this event is to fill a diary with entries that display images of characters from the games that participate in this event (the same as Hakken! Yomigaetta BEMANI Iseki minus ミライダガッキ FutureTomTom, which ceased receiving e-Amusement service on July 31, 2015). Each entry features two characters representing two games. Playing the participating games normally fills the entry by 4.9% per credit, while playing with Premium Mode (using PASELI) fills by 7.4%. Once it is full, a new song will be unlocked in one of the two games featured on the entry. Additionally, playing the two games featured on the image multiplies the increase rate by 3x, and playing during the date and the next 7 days the song is made available to unlock multiplies the rate again by 3x and 1.5x, respectively.

For example, the 3rd and 4th entries feature Baby-Lon (representing DDR) and Pastel-kun (representing REFLEC BEAT). In filling the 3rd entry, one of these games can be played for the 3x multiplier, but only DDR will receive a new song, Sakura Mirage. Similarly, the 4th entry can be filled quickly by playing these two games, but only REFLEC BEAT will receive a new song, ΔMAX. The entries are to be filled consecutively; one cannot jump to the 3rd entry to unlock a song for DDR, but instead have to fill the 1st and 2nd entries (for beatmania IIDX and SOUND VOLTEX BOOTH) first.

== Music ==
There are ten new songs revealed through the location tests. Two are only playable in Final Stage through special requirements. Two licensed songs have recently been revealed through advertising materials of the game. During the game's showcase in Japan Amusement Expo 2013 (JAEPO 2013), five more songs were revealed, three of which are licenses while the others are all Konami Originals.

The song list is split into two folders: the 2013 and the 2014 versions. In DDR 2013, there are 102 new songs of 599 total. Most of the songs from previous versions returned, though there are a total of 19 songs that have been removed. In DDR 2014, there are 94 new songs of 671 total. Most of the songs from previous versions returned and some songs are moved to the newer version, though there are a total of 22 songs that have been removed.

== Soundtrack ==
Unlike previous games in the series, the game's soundtrack is split into several volumes. The first volume, titled DanceDanceRevolution Original Soundtrack Vol.1 was announced on August 28, 2013 and released on October 23, 2013. It spans two discs containing all songs other than master licenses that were included in the game up to October 2, 2013. The first disc has most of the new Konami Originals and songs imported from console versions, while the second has the rest of the new Konami Originals, crossovers from other BEMANI games, and full version of several songs. The soundtrack also includes two songs from Dance Dance Revolution X3 vs. 2ndMix that were not included in that game's soundtrack.

The second volume, titled DanceDanceRevolution Original Soundtrack Vol.2 was announced on November 25, 2015 and released on December 2, 2015 in digital format only. It features the new songs released post-October 2, 2013 up to September 10, 2015, including crossovers and songs from the console versions. It also features several long version of songs previously exclusive to Dance Dance Revolution (2010) and Dance Dance Revolution II, which were never released in Japan, plus two new long versions, Elysium (Original Size) and Freeze (Original Size).
