= Dance Dance Revolution (1998 video game) =

1998 Video game

- American flyer
- Developer: Bemani
- Publisher: Konami
- Series: Dance Dance Revolution
- Platforms: Arcade, PlayStation
- Release: Arcade: JP: September 26, 1998; NA: March 1999; EU: March 9, 1999; AS: 1999; PlayStation: JP: April 10, 1999; NA: May 9, 2001
- Genres: Music, exercise
- Modes: Single-player, multiplayer
- Arcade system: Bemani System 573 Analog

Dance Dance Revolution (Note: Japanese: ダンスダンスレボリューション, Hepburn: Dansu Dansu Reboryūshon) (DDR) is a music video game developed by Konami. Played with feet instead of hands, DDR popularized the genre, spawning imitators and a franchise of the same name.

It was originally released to arcades in Japan on September 26, 1998. In March 1999, the game was released to North American arcades as Dance Dance Revolution and to European arcades under the name Dancing Stage.

On April 10, 1999, DDR was released for the Japanese PlayStation, adding new music and gameplay elements. A console release was not made for any other region until 2001.

== Gameplay ==
The objective of Dance Dance Revolution is to move one's feet to rhythms and patterns displayed on a screen.

Players must step to the beat, matching the arrows presented to them on screen by stepping on arrows on a dance pad. Arrows come from the bottom to the top towards a set of stationary arrows known as the "Step Zone". If they reach it, players step on the pad and the game will then judge the accuracy of the timing, ranging from "Perfect", "Great", "Good", "Boo", to "Miss". An on-screen life meter, known as the Dance Gauge, begins halfway full at the start of each song. Perfect and Great steps slowly fill the Gauge, while Boo and Miss steps quickly deplete it. Good steps have no effect either way. If a player accumulates too many Boos or Misses, and the Dance Gauge becomes empty, the song fails and the game ends. The game also tracks a combo tally from 4 combos upward, which will break if players score Good or lower.

At the end of each song, players see their accumulated points, bonus points, and how many of each kind of step they made. They also get a letter grade that is dependent on the judgments received during play, ranging from SS, all steps Perfect, to E, failure, which is only seen in Couple mode when the other player passes. If players manage to pass all their songs a cumulative results screen is given, totaling the stats from all played stages.

The game offers three play styles: Single (one player plays on a single dance pad), Couple (two players play with a unified stepchart spread over two separate dance pads), and Double (one player plays on two dance pads, stepcharts are different compared to Single), the last of which requires a step code to be entered. After selecting a play style, players will be prompted to select a game mode out of three: Easy, Normal, and Hard. Normal and Hard are the main bulk of the game and offer different set of songs. Easy, which has the same song selection as Normal, limits players to one stage but enables them to play to the end of the song even if the dance meter is completely depleted.

After choosing a mode, players will be taken to the song selection, which takes the form of a jukebox-like menu of CDs that represent the available songs. On this screen, various step codes can be entered on the dance stage to adjust the game. Single Play offers two different difficulty levels per song. These levels, known as "Basic" and "Another", may be set while selecting play style or by entering step codes during the song selection. Each difficulty is rated on a scale of 1 to 7, each labeled with a name: Simple (1), Average (2), Novice (3), Expert (4), Professional (5), Genuine (6), and Hero (7). Another step code enables the "Mirror" option, which rotates each arrows to their opposite directions. Players may play anywhere from one to five songs, depending on how many the arcade operator sets the machine to play each game. Players start with 6 song options and cannot choose the same song twice within the same credit. If they manage to fill the dance meter to maximum in Final Stage while playing Basic difficulty in Single Play, players will be granted access to Extra Stage, where they may choose another song set to Another difficulty. A new song will also be added, which varies depending on whether players selected Normal or Hard modes.

During gameplay, 3D dancing characters appear in the background of each song. Different characters can be selected at the main title screen by standing on either the left or right arrow panels while pressing the select button.

=== Internet Ranking Version ===
An update, titled "Internet Ranking Version" and popularly known as "DDR 1.5", was released on November 18, 1998 and is by far the most common version of the game. As the name suggests, the game's main purpose is to rank scores online. After a playthrough ends, the game gives a code which can be inputted to the official website for high score purposes.

The game also adds two new songs and numerous different changes to the gameplay. A new addition is Versus Play, which requires two credits and a step code to activate. It is a two-player mode, similar to Couple, but rather than playing on a unified stepchart, each player plays their own stepchart, though they still have to select the same difficulty level. Two difficulty levels are added: "Maniac" for Single Play and "Another" for Double Play. It is possible to access Extra Stage by clearing Final Stage on Single Another or Double Basic, which will lead Extra Stage to be played on Single Maniac and Double Another, respectively. The difficulty scale is increased to 8, labeled "Exorbitant", and some of the other labels are renamed; Moderate (2), Ordinary (3), Superior (4), Marvelous (5), and Paramount (7). Finally, arrows now disappear within the Step Zone if players score Perfect or Great (the original version made no distinction regardless of timing), which has since become a staple in the series.

== Home version ==
The home version was released in Japan on Saturday April 10, 1999 for the PlayStation. It includes all 11 songs from the original arcade version along with 5 new songs, three of which are from the arcade version of Dance Dance Revolution 2ndMIX and the rest being console-exclusive songs (which would be added in DDR 2ndMIX Link Version) for a total of 16 songs. It also includes Edit Mode (for editing stepcharts) and Arrange Mode (a mode where if the player step on direction the arrows not meant to appear, they will get a miss).

== Sequels ==
=== Dance Dance Revolution 2ndMix ===
Dance Dance Revolution 2ndMix (ダンスダンスレボリューションセカンドミックス, Dansu Dansu Reboryūshon SekandoMikkusu), sometimes abbreviated as 2ndMix (セカンドミックス, SekandoMikkusu), is the second game in the Dance Dance Revolution series of music video games. It was released as an arcade game by Konami in Japan on January 29, 1999.

It has a total of 32 songs: ten from the original Dance Dance Revolution arcade game and 26 all-new songs. The graphics are mostly retained from the original game, with some changes. The jukebox song list now displays 8 song options instead of 6 and a "Random" option, which if selected will cause a random song to play the next stage. Other than Mirror, many new options can be activated with step codes: Left (shifts the arrow placements to the left), Right (shifts the placement to the right), Shuffle (randomizes the placement), Hidden (arrows disappear when they are about to reach the Step Zone), and Little (eliminates all non-quarter beat steps, which will lessen the maximum score available to attain). Through step codes, two players may also select different difficulty levels while playing in Versus and Couple modes. The game removes Extra Stage and adds Step Battle, a competitive play style in which each player records a series of steps for the other player to play. Step Battle is exclusive to three songs and can only be accessed with codes.

An updated version, Dance Dance Revolution 2ndMix Link Version, was released to Japanese arcades on April 28, 1999. This version came with a PlayStation memory card reader, installed in the middle of the arcade cabinet. It supports cards that have Link Data from the home version of Dance Dance Revolution, allowing each player to save high scores and play custom step edits. 2ndMix Link Version adds five new songs to the game, two from the home version and three new licenses, for a total of 37 songs. The game adds an "All Music" mode, making it the first time players can access the entire song list from the start. Future Dance Dance Revolution releases in Japan, up to and including Dance Dance Revolution Extreme, integrated Link Data functionality in-game. However, these required different home games to produce different Link Data formats: 3rdMix, 4thMix, 4thMix Plus, 5thMix and New Version.

Dance Dance Revolution 2ndReMix (ダンスダンスレボリューションセカンドリミックス, Dansu Dansu Reboryūshon SekandoRiMikkusu), the home version of 2ndMix, was released in Japan on April 20, 2000, for the Sony PlayStation. It includes 35 songs, 3 of which are new to this version and are hidden and unlockable. Two of the hidden songs were previews of the next arcade version, Dance Dance Revolution 3rdMix and can only be played on Basic difficulty. The home version has the ability to Disc Change to 1st and Append Club Version. It also allows to unlock features in previous mixes such as the Nonstop Ranking from 3rd Mix. The interface is still the same as the one used in 2ndMix.

On April 20, 2000, Konami released a version of Dance Dance Revolution 2ndMix for the Dreamcast console. It features 47 songs, seven of which are hidden and unlockable. The song list includes seven songs from Dance Dance Revolution 3rdMix.

Most of the new songs in 2ndMix (with the exception of "BAD GIRLS", "BOYS", "HERO", "stomp to my beat", and the So-REAL Mix of "MAKE IT BETTER") were included in the North American version of Dance Dance Revolution for the PlayStation.

=== Dance Dance Revolution 3rdMix ===
Dance Dance Revolution 3rdMix (ダンスダンスレボリューションサードミックス, Dansu Dansu Reboryūshon SādoMikkusu), sometimes abbreviated as 3rdMix, is the third game in the Dance Dance Revolution series of music video games. It was released in Japanese arcades by Konami on Saturday October 30, 1999. The arcade machine is the first to be based on Bemani System 573 Digital. It has a total of 72 songs, 35 of which are new to the arcade series.

Instead of Easy, Medium, and Hard, the mode selection now offers "Soft", "Medium", and "Nonstop". Soft, a replacement of Easy, activates the Little option permanently and only allows one song to be selected. Medium leads to normal gameplay. Nonstop is a new mode in which players select a course which contains 4 songs back-to-back. Couple Style has been replaced by Unison, where two players play a unified stepchart featuring parts where they have to step on the same direction at the same time. Step Battle has also been removed.

Before the game starts, players may toggle game modes using codes to switch between "3rdMix", "2ndMix", and "Step Step Revolution (SSR)". 3rdMix and SSR modes give access to the new songs, but 3rdMix Mode limits players to choose Basic and Another difficulties, while SSR Mode limits access to Maniac, now renamed "SSR". 2ndMix Mode is an updated recreation of DDR 2ndMix, featuring 37 songs in a 3rdMix interface and enables all three difficulties to be selected. The game is the first to add Double Maniac/SSR stepcharts, but these are not available in 2ndMix Mode. The difficulty scale has been further increased to 9, labeled as "Catastrophic".

The game still utilizes the jukebox-style song list but modifies it so that the highlighted song's CD is displayed to the front. Instead of being accessed through codes, players may choose a character through a dedicated screen. The game is the first to differentiate the colors of arrows based on their timing, an option known as "Vivid". Vivid is turned on by default in 3rdMix and 2ndMix Modes, but must be enabled with a code in SSR Mode, as "Flat" (all arrows are the same color; the previous arrow option) is turned on by default instead. Other new options added include Sudden (arrows appear midway through while rising up towards the Step Zone, a reverse of Hidden) and Stealth (arrows are invisible, requiring memorization)

3rdMix was reissued as Dance Dance Revolution 3rdMix Plus on June 21, 2000. This title, exclusive to Japan, adds 17 songs: three new DanceMania licenses, seven K-Pop tracks from VER.KOREA and seven Konami Originals. Two of these Konami Originals made their arcade premiere in Dancing Stage EuroMix. SSR Mode is removed and its Maniac stepcharts are folded back to 3rdMix Mode. New content for Plus is selectable in "3rdMix Plus Mode" separate from 3rdMix Mode.

Different versions of Dance Dance Revolution 3rdMix were released for other countries in Asia. The first release in 1999 removed four new songs, made "Strictly Business" unavailable outside of 2ndMix mode and had a bug when trying to enter the Shuffle modification. Two versions of the game were later released exclusively in South Korea: VER.KOREA on April 1, 2000 and VER.KOREA2 on May 1, 2000. VER.KOREA features the same song changes found in the Asia version, but fixes the Shuffle bug and adds seven new Korean pop songs in 3rdMix and SSR modes. VER.KOREA2 is identical to VER.KOREA, but adds nine more K-Pop songs.

International variants include Dancing Stage EuroMix and Dance Dance Revolution USA. EuroMix was released in European arcades in August 2000. It has a reduced song list of 28 songs, half which are Konami Originals and half which are licenses. Of the licenses, eight are from Universal Music Group and are only available in this arcade release. Six Konami Originals can be added by activating Internet Ranking, for a total of 34 songs. USA was released in North American arcades in October 2000. It has a reduced song list of 26 songs: six licenses and 20 Konami Originals. EuroMix with Internet Ranking and USA share four licenses and 15 Konami Originals in common, including two 3rdMix Plus tracks: "Love This Feelin'" and "TRIP MACHINE ～luv mix～".

In 2004, Dance Dance Revolution 3rdMix was inducted into GameSpot's list of the greatest games of all time.

=== Dance Dance Revolution 4thMix ===
Dance Dance Revolution 4thMix (ダンスダンスレボリューションフォースミックス, Dansu Dansu Reboryūshon Fōsu Mikkusu), or 4thMix (フォースミックス, Fōsu Mikkusu), is the 4th game in the main Dance Dance Revolution series of music video games. It was released as an arcade game by Konami on August 24, 2000. 4thMix features 136 songs, 49 of which are new to this mix. Twelve of the songs are initially hidden and must be unlocked by the arcade operator.

Many parts of the interface are overhauled. Instead of codes being used to select play style, there is a dedicated Play Style selection in which players can select between Single, Versus, Double, or Nonstop. Players then select one out of eight different categories in which the song list has been divided, each also featuring a different character. Instead of a jukebox, the song list is now presented in seven diagonal banners visible at any time. Scrolling past the rightmost or leftmost banner will bring another seven banners. After choosing a song, players will be prompted to select a difficulty level, instead of having to input step codes to toggle it. "Another" is renamed to "Trick" and the level is no longer indicated by a label. Double Maniac stepchart has been added for songs lacking it in the previous game. Finally, in Versus Play, players can access "Battle" stepcharts from the difficulty selection, which replaces Unison Mode. In Battle, arrows come from a single lane at the bottom before going to either the 1st or 2nd Player.

The game was reissued as Dance Dance Revolution 4thMix Plus on December 28, 2000. Like 3rdMix Plus, it is an upgraded version, adding 14 new songs, adding to 150 songs in total. An All Music category is added, enabling players to access the entire song list from the start. Some songs have new Maniac stepcharts, while their old Maniac charts from the original game are recategorized as "Maniac-S" (for Single) or "Maniac-D" (for Double). There is also a DDR Solo version of this mix, which offers 4-step and 6-step modes in a DDR Solo cabinet.

=== Dance Dance Revolution 5thMix ===
Dance Dance Revolution 5thMIX, or DDR 5th Mix, is the 5th game in the Dance Dance Revolution series of music video games. It was released to the arcades by Konami on March 27, 2001. Although only officially released in Japan, units exist worldwide. DDR 5th Mix contains a total of 122 songs, nine of which are hidden and unlockable. Of those songs, 40 of them (including all nine unlockable songs) are brand new to Dance Dance Revolution.

The game runs on 60 frame rate instead of 30, the first mainline DDR game to do this (Dancing Stage featuring True Kiss Destination was the first). The song selection interface is changed once more to become wheel-like, with song titles displayed on the right in rectangular boxes and the highlighted song's banner, difficulty, and BPM displayed on the left. This so-called "song wheel" interface would become a mainstay for many DDR games in the future. Difficulty level is once again selected by pressing on the step panels, instead of being selected in a dedicated menu. The game is also the first to introduce AAA grade, as previous games only went up to AA. Both Nonstop and Battle Modes have been removed, while songs with new Maniac charts introduced in 4thMix Plus have their old Maniac charts removed. Categories has also been removed, though characters are still selected through a dedicated menu after Play Style. Finally, the game is one of the few to include long version of certain songs, which take up two whole stages and as a result cannot be selected in Final Stage.

=== Current Dance Dance Revolution releases ===
Dance Dance Revolution A was released on March 30, 2016, in Asia, with a North American release later in 2016, and a European release on December 15, 2017. It is the first international arcade release of Dance Dance Revolution since Dance Dance Revolution X2.

Dance Dance Revolution A20 was released on new, golden cabinets on March 20, 2019, and a United States release imported later on May 15, 2019.

Dance Dance Revolution WORLD was released in Japan, Korea, Australia, and the United States on June 12th, 2024, and is currently the most recent release in the series.

== Music ==
The following lists the tracklists featured in Dance Dance Revolution 3rdMix, Dance Dance Revolution 4thMix, and Dance Dance Revolution 5thMix. Unless noted, successive arcade games feature all songs featured in the preceding arcade games. For more information about the tracklists of the first two games, refer to the two links above. Note that 4thMix received two console ports; the second port, Dance Dance Revolution Extra Mix, essentially doubles as a console port of the Dance Dance Revolution Solo spin-off series by including nearly all of their songs, both licensed and Konami Original, plus tracks added in 4thMix Plus as well as new tracks.

The original soundtracks for all the arcade games up to Dance Dance Revolution Extreme were produced by Toshiba EMI under their Dancemania dance music brand. They also feature second Nonstop Megamix discs with the various songs in the games mixed together in succession.

Dance Dance Revolution 3rdMix Arcade song list

Song	Artist	Note
Licensed songs (24 total)
"BOOM DOOM DOLLAR (K.O.G G3 MIX)"	KING KONG & D.JUNGLE GIRLS	from Dancemania SPEED 3
"BUTTERFLY (UPSWING MIX)"	SMiLE.dk	from Dancemania SPEED 2
"CAPTAIN JACK (GRANDALE REMIX)"	CAPTAIN JACK	from Dancemania SPEED 2
"DAM DARIRAM"	JOGA	from Dancemania X3
"DO IT ALL NIGHT"	E-ROTIC	from Dancemania X4
"FLASHDANCE (WHAT A FEELING)"	MAGIKA	from Dancemania SPEED 2
"FOLLOW THE SUN (90 IN THE SHADE MIX)"	TRIPLE J	from Dancemania SPEED 2
"GET UP (BEFORE THE NIGHT IS OVER)"	TECHNOTRONIC feat.YA KID K	from Dancemania Super Classics 2
"GET UP AND DANCE"	FREEDOM	from Dancemania Club Classics
"HOLIDAY"	WHO'S THAT GIRL!	from ZIPmania II
"IF YOU CAN SAY GOODBYE"	KATE PROJECT	from Dancemania X2
"IN THE NAVY '99 (XXL Disaster Remix)"	CAPTAIN JACK	from Dancemania X3
"IT ONLY TAKES A MINUTE (Extended Remix)"	TAVARES	from Dancemania Super Classics 1
"MR.WONDERFUL"	SMiLE.dk	from Dancemania X2
"OH NICK PLEASE NOT SO QUICK"	E-ROTIC	from Dancemania X2
"OPERATOR"	PAPAYA	from Dancemania X3
"ROCK BEAT"	LOUD FORCE	from Dancemania X4
"SO MANY MEN"	ME & MY	from ZIPmania II
"THE RACE"	CAPTAIN JACK	from Dancemania X4
"TURN ME ON (HEAVENLY MIX)"	E-ROTIC	from Dancemania SPEED 2
"UPSIDE DOWN"	COO COO	from Dancemania Super Classics 1
"VOL.4"	RAVERS CHOICE	from Dancemania SPEED 2
"WONDERLAND (UKS MIX)"	X-TREME	from Dancemania SUMMERS 2
"XANADU"	THE OLIVIA PROJECT	from Dancemania 3
Licensed songs (Ver.Korea, Ver.Korea 2, and 3rdMix Plus only) (7 total)
"바꿔" (Ba Kkwo)	이정현	from the album Let's Go to My Star
"부담" (Bu Dam)	백지영	from the album Sorrow
"별" (Byul)	TEAM	from the album Teamplay
"FACE"	N.R.G	from the album New Radiancy Group
"성숙" (Sung Suk)	SPACE A	from the album Maturation
"TELL ME TELL ME"	S#ARP	from the album The Sharp +2
"와" (Wa)	이정현	from the album Let's Go to My Star
Licensed songs (Ver.Korea 2 only) (9 total)
"아름다운 21C" (Aromdaon 21C)	2000 대한민국	from the album 2000 대한민국
"가까이" (Gaggai)	(s#arp)	from the album THE S#ARP
"가면의 시간" (Gamyeonui Sigan)	FIN.K.L	from the album S.P.E.C.I.A.L
"GIMME GIMME"	컨츄리꼬꼬	from the album color of CHAMELEON
"경고" (Gyoung Go)	타샤니	from the album Parallel Prophecy
"호기심" (Hogisim)	한스 밴드	from the album 호기심
"ROSE"	FIN.K.L	from the album S.P.E.C.I.A.L
"SHOCK"	GOOFY	from the album Technogoofy
"Starian"	DUKE	from the album Duke 2000
Licensed songs (3rdMix Plus only) (3 total)
"BUMBLE BEE"	bambee	from Dancemania X5
"GIMME GIMME GIMME"	E-ROTIC	from Dancemania X5
"HERO (KCP DISCOTIQUE MIX)"	PAPAYA	from Dancemania BASS#6
Konami Original songs (7 total)
"AFRONOVA"	RE-VENGE	New Konami Original
"DEAD END"	N&S	New Konami Original
"DYNAMITE RAVE"	NAOKI	New Konami Original
"END OF THE CENTURY"	NO.9	New Konami Original
"La Senorita"	CAPTAIN.T	New Konami Original
"PARANOiA Rebirth"	190'	New Konami Original
"Silent Hill"	THOMAS HOWARD	New Konami Original
AMD Remix songs (4 total)
"gentle stress (AMD SEXUAL MIX)"	MR.DOG feat. DJ SWAN	New Konami Original
"GRADIUSIC CYBER (AMD G5 MIX)"	BIG-O feat. TAKA	New Konami Original
"Jam Jam Reggae (AMD SWING MIX)"	RICE.C feat. jam master '73	New Konami Original
"LUV TO ME (AMD MIX)"	DJ KAZU feat. tiger YAMATO	New Konami Original
From Console Version (3rdMix Plus only) (7 total)
"AFTER THE GAME OF LOVE"	NPD3	from Dance Dance Revolution 3rdMix (PS)
"CUTIE CHASER"	CLUB SPICE	from Dance Dance Revolution 3rdMix (PS)
"DROP THE BOMB"	Scotty D.	from Dance Dance Revolution 3rdMix (PS)
"La Senorita Virtual"	2MB	from Dance Dance Revolution 3rdMix (PS)
"LOVE THIS FEELIN'"	Chang Ma	from Dance Dance Revolution 2ndRemix (PS)
"think ya better D"	sAmi	from Dance Dance Revolution 2ndRemix (PS)
"TRIP MACHINE ~luv mix~"	2MB	from Dance Dance Revolution 2ndRemix (PS)
Removed song (3rdMix Plus only) (1 total)
"STRICTLY BUSINESS"	MANTRONIK VS EPMD	from Dance Dance Revolution

Dance Dance Revolution 4thMix Arcade song list

Song	Artist	Note
Licensed songs (24 total)
"1,2,3,4,007"	NI-NI	from Dancemania X6
"BOYS (EURO MIX)"	SMiLE.dk	from Dancemania EURO☆MIX HAPPY PARADISE
"DAM DARIRAM (KCP MIX)"	JOGA	from Dancemania SPEED 4
"DREAM A DREAM"	CAPTAIN JACK	from Dancemania X2
"EAT YOU UP"	ANGIE GOLD	from Dancemania Super Classics 1
"GOTCHA (The Theme from STARSKY & HUTCH)"	ANDY G's MAGIC DISCO MACHINE	from Dancemania SUMMERS 3
"HAVE YOU NEVER BEEN MELLOW (MM GROOVIN MIX)"	THE OLIVIA PROJECT	from Dancemania SPEED 4
"HERO (HAPPY GRANDALE MIX)"	PAPAYA	from Dancemania SPEED 4
"IF YOU WERE HERE (B4 ZA BEAT MIX)"	JENNIFER	from Dancemania SPEED 4
"IN THE HEAT OF THE NIGHT"	E-ROTIC	from Dancemania X7
"KICK THE CAN"	BUS STOP	from ZIPmania III
"MUSIC"	HABEGALE	from Dancemania X4
"NEVER GONNA MAKE (FACTORY DANCE TEAM MIX)"	MORGANA	from Dancemania X6
"NIGHT IN MOTION"	CUBIC 22	from CLUB THE EARTH DISCO CLASSICS
"NINZABURO"	C.J.Crew feat.Sedge	from Dancemania SPEED 5
"ONE TWO (LITTLE BITCH)"	BUS STOP	from Dancemania X6
"ONLY YOU"	CAPTAIN JACK	from Dancemania BASS#6
"PINK DINOSAUR"	PAPAYA	from Dancemania X2
"SAINT GOES MARCHING (REMIX)"	THE SAINT	from Dancemania SPEED 4
"SHAKE YOUR BOOTY"	KC & THE SUNSHINE BAND	from Dancemania Club Classics 2
"SHOOTING STAR"	BANG	from Dancemania SPEED
"THE 7 JUMP"	KEN D	from Dancemania X7
"WALKIE TALKIE"	KING KONG & D.JUNGLE GIRLS	from Dancemania Super Classics 2
"Young Forever"	REBECCA	from Dancemania X6
Licensed songs (4thMix Plus only) (12 total)
"CAFE"	D.D.SOUND	from Dancemania Super Classics 3
"CAT'S EYE (Ventura Mix)"	E-ROTIC	from Dance Maniax 2ndMix from Dancemania presents E-ROTIC MEGAMIX
"CONGA FEELING"	VIVIAN	from Dancemania SUMMERS 3
"DO ME (H.I.G.E.O MIX)"	MUSTACHE MEN	cover of Teddy Pendergrass
"Lupin the 3rd '78"	VENTURA	from Dancemania presents J★PARADISE
"NA-NA"	BUS STOP	from Dancemania DIAMOND
"PETIT LOVE"	SMiLE.dk	from Dance Maniax 2ndMix from Dancemania EURO MIX HAPPY PARADISE
"RHYTHM AND POLICE (K.O.G G3 MIX)"	CJ CREW feat. CHRISTIAN D.	from Dancemania SPEED BEST 2001
"SKY HIGH"	LUCYFER	from Dancemania EURO MIX HAPPY PARADISE
"SYNCHRONIZED LOVE (Red Monster Hyper Mix)"	JOE RINOIE	from Dance Maniax 2ndMix from Dancemania EURO MIX HAPPY PARADISE
"THEME FROM ENTER THE DRAGON (Revival 2001 Mix)"	B3-PROJECT	cover of Lalo Schifrin
"WONDA (SPEED K MIX)"	MM	from Dancemania SPEED BEST 2001
Konami Original songs (9 total)
"B4U"	NAOKI	New Konami Original
"BABY BABY GIMME YOUR LOVE"	DIVAS	New Konami Original
"BURNIN' THE FLOOR"	NAOKI	New Konami Original
"HIGHER"	NM feat. SUNNY	New Konami Original
"HYPNΦTIC CRISIS"	BLUE DESTROYERS	New Konami Original
"LOVE AGAIN TONIGHT (For Melissa MIX)"	NAOKI feat. PAULA TERRY	New Konami Original
"MY SUMMER LOVE"	mitsu-O! with GEILA	New Konami Original
"ORION.78 (AMeuro-MIX)"	RE-VENGE	New Konami Original
"TRIP MACHINE CLIMAX"	DE-SIRE	New Konami Original
AMD Remix songs (2 total)
"Don't Stop! (AMD 2nd MIX)"	Dr.VIBE feat. JP miles	New Konami Original
"Get me in your sight (AMD CANCUN MIX)"	SYMPHONIC DEFOGGERS with 1479	New Konami Original
DDR Solo crossover songs (7 total)
"CAN'T STOP FALLIN' IN LOVE"	NAOKI	from Dance Dance Revolution Solo 2000
"DROP OUT"	NW260	from Dance Dance Revolution Solo 2000
"HYSTERIA"	NAOKI 190	from Dance Dance Revolution Solo Bass Mix
"Let the beat hit em!"	STONE BROS.	from Dance Dance Revolution Solo Bass Mix
"PARANOIA EVOLUTION"	200	from Dance Dance Revolution Solo Bass Mix
"SUPER STAR"	D.J.RICH feat. Tail Bros.	from Dance Dance Revolution Solo Bass Mix
"WILD RUSH"	FACTOR-X	from Dance Dance Revolution Solo 2000
Dancing Stage True Kiss Destination crossover songs (4thMix Plus only) (2 total)
"CELEBRATE NITE"	N.M.R	from Dancing Stage featuring True Kiss Destination
"SEXY PLANET"	Crystal Aliens	from Dancing Stage featuring True Kiss Destination
BEMANI crossover songs (7 total)
".59"	dj TAKA	from beatmania IIDX 2nd Style
"era (nostalmix)"	TaQ	from beatmania IIDX 3rd Style
"Holic"	TaQ	from beatmania IIDX 3rd Style
"LEADING CYBER"	dj TAKA	from beatmania IIDX 3rd Style
"Let's talk it over"	SHIN Murayama feat. Argie Phine	from beatmania IIDX 3rd Style
"Make Your Move"	good-cool feat. JP Miles	from beatmania IIDX 3rd Style
"never let you down"	good-cool feat. JP Miles	from beatmania IIDX 3rd Style
Removed song (1 total)
"SO MANY MEN"	ME & MY	from Dance Dance Revolution 3rdMix

Dance Dance Revolution 5thMix Arcade song list

Song	Artist	Note
Licensed songs (19 total)
"17才" (17 Sai)	BAMBEE	from Dancemania PRESENTS J★PARADISE
"AGAINST ALL ODDS (Definitive MIX)"	DEJAVU featuring TASMIN	from Dancemania X8
"BE TOGETHER"	NI-NI	from Dancemania PRESENTS J★PARADISE
"CAN'T STOP FALLIN' IN LOVE (SPEED MIX)"	NAOKI	from Dancemania SPEED 6
"DANCING ALL ALONE"	SMiLE.dk	from Dancemania X8
**"HOT LIMIT"**	**JOHN DESIRE**	**from Dancemania PRESENTS J★PARADISE**
"MOONLIGHT SHADOW (New Vocal Version)"	MISSING HEART	from Dancemania X8
"MOVIN ON (Extended Moon Mix)"	ELLEN GEE	from Dancemania X8
"MY GENERATION (Fat Beat Mix)"	CAPTAIN JACK	from Dancemania X8
"NEVER ENDING STORY (Power Club Vocal Mix)"	DJ AC/DC	from Dancemania X8
"NO LIMIT (RM Remix)"	2 UNLIMITED	from Dancemania DIAMOND
"おどるポンポコリン" (Odoru Pompokolin)	CAPTAIN JACK	from Dancemania PRESENTS J★PARADISE
**"OOPS!...I DID IT AGAIN (Fired Up MIX)"**	**ROCHELLE**	**from Dancemania X8**
"RIGHT NOW"	ATOMIC KITTEN	from Dancemania DIAMOND
"ロマンスの神様" (Romance no Kamisama)	JUDY CRYSTAL	from Dancemania PRESENTS J★PARADISE
"SWING IT"	BUS STOP	from Dancemania SUMMERS 2001
"TEST MY BEST"	E-ROTIC	from Dancemania X8
"The TWIST (Double Pump MIX)"	LIBERTY ALL STAZ	from Dancemania BASS#10 SUPER BEST
"TRIBAL DANCE (Almighty Mix)"	2 UNLIMITED	from Dancemania X8
Konami Original songs (10 total)
**"B4U glorious style"**	**NAOKI**	**New Konami Original**
"DIVE"	BeForU	New Konami Original
**"DYNAMITE RAVE (Long ver.)"**	**NAOKI**	**New Konami Original**
"ECSTASY"	d-complex	New Konami Original
"Healing Vision"	DE-SIRE	New Konami Original
"INSERTiON"	NAOKI underground	New Konami Original
"祭 JAPAN" (Matsuri JAPAN)	RE-VENGE	New Konami Original
"PARANOiA ETERNAL"	STM200	New Konami Original
"Remember You"	NM	New Konami Original
"STILL IN MY HEART"	NAOKI	New Konami Original
BEMANI crossover songs (11 songs)
"ABSOLUTE"	dj TAKA	from beatmania IIDX 4th Style
"Abyss"	dj TAKA	from beatmania IIDX 5th Style
"AFRONOVA PRIMEVAL"	8bit	from Dance Maniax
"BROKEN MY HEART"	NAOKI feat. PAULA TERRY	from Dance Maniax
"DXY!"	TaQ	from beatmania IIDX 4th Style
"Electro Tuned (the SubS mix)"	TaQ	from beatmania IIDX 2nd Style
"I Was The One"	good-cool	from beatmania IIDX 2nd Style
"Mr.T (take me higher)"	Risky Men feat. Asuka M	from beatmania IIDX 4th Style
"Radical Faith"	TaQ	from beatmania IIDX 5th Style
"サナ・モレッテ・ネ・エンテ" (Sana Mollete Ne Ente)	Togo Project feat. Sana	from beatmania APPEND GOTTAMIX 2 ~Going Global~
"THE CUBE"	DJ SUWAMI	from beatmania IIDX 5th Style
Removed songs (68 total)
"SAINT GOES MARCHING (REMIX)"	THE SAINT	from Dance Dance Revolution 4thMix
"AFTER THE GAME OF LOVE"	NPD3	from Dance Dance Revolution 3rdMix Plus
"BA KKWO"	LEE JUNG-HYUN	from Dance Dance Revolution 3rdMix Plus
"BU DAM"	BAEK JI-YOUNG	from Dance Dance Revolution 3rdMix Plus
"BYUL"	TEAM	from Dance Dance Revolution 3rdMix Plus
"CUTIE CHASER"	CLUB SPICE	from Dance Dance Revolution 3rdMix Plus
"DROP THE BOMB"	Scotty D.	from Dance Dance Revolution 3rdMix Plus
"FACE"	N.R.G	from Dance Dance Revolution 3rdMix Plus
"La Senorita Virtual"	2MB	from Dance Dance Revolution 3rdMix Plus
"LOVE THIS FEELIN'"	Chang Ma	from Dance Dance Revolution 3rdMix Plus
"SUNG SUK"	SPACE A	from Dance Dance Revolution 3rdMix Plus
"TELL ME TELL ME"	(s#arp)	from Dance Dance Revolution 3rdMix Plus
"think ya better D"	sAmi	from Dance Dance Revolution 3rdMix Plus
"TRIP MACHINE ~luv mix~"	2MB	from Dance Dance Revolution 3rdMix Plus
"WA"	LEE JUNG-HYUN	from Dance Dance Revolution 3rdMix Plus
"AFRONOVA"	RE-VENGE	from Dance Dance Revolution 3rdMix
"BUTTERFLY (UPSWING MIX)"	SMiLE.dk	from Dance Dance Revolution 3rdMix
"DO IT ALL NIGHT"	E-ROTIC	from Dance Dance Revolution 3rdMix
"FLASHDANCE (WHAT A FEELING)"	MAGIKA	from Dance Dance Revolution 3rdMix
"FOLLOW THE SUN (90 IN THE SHADE MIX)"	TRIPLE J	from Dance Dance Revolution 3rdMix
"gentle stress (AMD SEXUAL MIX)"	MR.DOG feat. DJ SWAN	from Dance Dance Revolution 3rdMix
"GET UP (BEFORE THE NIGHT IS OVER)"	TECHNOTRONIC feat. YA KID K	from Dance Dance Revolution 3rdMix
"GET UP AND DANCE"	FREEDOM	from Dance Dance Revolution 3rdMix
"GRADIUSIC CYBER (AMD G5 MIX)"	BIG-O feat. TAKA	from Dance Dance Revolution 3rdMix
"HOLIDAY"	WHO'S THAT GIRL!	from Dance Dance Revolution 3rdMix
"IF YOU CAN SAY GOODBYE"	KATE PROJECT	from Dance Dance Revolution 3rdMix
"IN THE NAVY '99 (XXL Disaster Remix)"	CAPTAIN JACK	from Dance Dance Revolution 3rdMix
"JAM JAM REGGAE (AMD SWING MIX)"	RICE.C feat. jam master '73	from Dance Dance Revolution 3rdMix
"MR.WONDERFUL"	SMiLE.dk	from Dance Dance Revolution 3rdMix
"OH NICK PLEASE NOT SO QUICK"	E-ROTIC	from Dance Dance Revolution 3rdMix
"OPERATOR"	PAPAYA	from Dance Dance Revolution 3rdMix
"PARANOiA Rebirth"	190'	from Dance Dance Revolution 3rdMix
"ROCK BEAT"	LOUD FORCE	from Dance Dance Revolution 3rdMix
"Silent Hill"	THOMAS HOWARD	from Dance Dance Revolution 3rdMix
"THE RACE"	CAPTAIN JACK	from Dance Dance Revolution 3rdMix
"TURN ME ON (HEAVENLY MIX)"	E-ROTIC	from Dance Dance Revolution 3rdMix
"UPSIDE DOWN"	COO COO	from Dance Dance Revolution 3rdMix
"VOL.4"	RAVERS CHOICE	from Dance Dance Revolution 3rdMix
"WONDERLAND (UKS MIX)"	X-TREME	from Dance Dance Revolution 3rdMix
"20, NOVEMBER (D.D.R. VERSION)"	N.M.R. feat. DJ nagureo	from Dance Dance Revolution 2ndMix
"AM-3P"	KTz	from Dance Dance Revolution 2ndMix
"BAD GIRLS"	Juliet Roberts	from Dance Dance Revolution 2ndMix
"BOOM BOOM DOLLAR"	King Kong & D.Jungle Girls	from Dance Dance Revolution 2ndMix
"BOYS"	SMiLE.dk	from Dance Dance Revolution 2ndMix
"BRILLIANT 2U (Orchestra-Groove)"	NAOKI	from Dance Dance Revolution 2ndMix
"EL RITMO TROPICAL"	DIXIES GANG	from Dance Dance Revolution 2ndMix
"GET UP'N MOVE"	S&K	from Dance Dance Revolution 2ndMix
"HERO"	PAPAYA	from Dance Dance Revolution 2ndMix
"KEEP ON MOVIN'"	N.M.R	from Dance Dance Revolution 2ndMix
"LET THEM MOVE"	N.M.R.	from Dance Dance Revolution 2ndMix
"LOVE"	SONIC DREAM	from Dance Dance Revolution 2ndMix
"MAKE A JAM!"	U1	from Dance Dance Revolution 2ndMix
"MAKE IT BETTER (So-REAL Mix)"	mitsu-O!SUMMER	from Dance Dance Revolution 2ndMix
"PARANOiA KCET ~clean mix~"	2MB	from Dance Dance Revolution 2ndMix
"PUT YOUR FAITH IN ME"	UZI-LAY	from Dance Dance Revolution 2ndMix
"PUT YOUR FAITH IN ME (Jazzy Groove)"	UZI-LAY	from Dance Dance Revolution 2ndMix
"SMOKE"	MR.ED JUMPS THE GUN	from Dance Dance Revolution 2ndMix
"SP-TRIP MACHINE ~JUNGLE MIX~"	DE-SIRE	from Dance Dance Revolution 2ndMix
"TUBTHUMPING"	CHUMBAWAMBA	from Dance Dance Revolution 2ndMix
"HAVE YOU NEVER BEEN MELLOW"	THE OLIVIA PROJECT	from Dance Dance Revolution
"KUNG FU FIGHTING"	BUS STOP featuring CARL DOUGLAS	from Dance Dance Revolution
"LET'S GET DOWN"	JT PLAYAZ	from Dance Dance Revolution
"LITTLE BITCH"	THE SPECIALS	from Dance Dance Revolution
"MAKE IT BETTER"	mitsu-O!	from Dance Dance Revolution
"MY FIRE"	X-TREME	from Dance Dance Revolution
"PARANOiA"	180	from Dance Dance Revolution
"THAT'S THE WAY (I LIKE IT)"	KC & THE SUNSHINE BAND	from Dance Dance Revolution
"TRIP MACHINE"	DE-SIRE	from Dance Dance Revolution

Dance Dance Revolution 3rdMix PlayStation song list

Song	Artist	Note
Licensed songs (21 total)
"BOOM DOOM DOLLAR (K.O.G G3 MIX)"	KING KONG & D.JUNGLE GIRLS	from Dancemania SPEED 3
"BUTTERFLY (UPSWING MIX)"	SMiLE.dk	from Dancemania SPEED 2
"CAPTAIN JACK (GRANDALE REMIX)"	CAPTAIN JACK	from Dancemania SPEED 2
"DAM DARIRAM"	JOGA	from Dancemania X3
"DO IT ALL NIGHT"	E-ROTIC	from Dancemania X4
"FLASHDANCE (WHAT A FEELING)"	MAGIKA	from Dancemania SPEED 2
"GET UP (BEFORE THE NIGHT IS OVER)"	TECHNOTRONIC feat.YA KID K	from Dancemania Super Classics 2
"GET UP AND DANCE"	FREEDOM	from Dancemania Club Classics
"HOLIDAY"	WHO'S THAT GIRL!	from ZIPmania II
"IF YOU CAN SAY GOODBYE"	KATE PROJECT	from Dancemania X2
"IN THE NAVY '99 (XXL Disaster Remix)"	CAPTAIN JACK	from Dancemania X3
"MR.WONDERFUL"	SMiLE.dk	from Dancemania X2
"OH NICK PLEASE NOT SO QUICK"	E-ROTIC	from Dancemania X2
"OPERATOR"	PAPAYA	from Dancemania X3
"ROCK BEAT"	LOUD FORCE	from Dancemania X4
"SO MANY MEN"	ME & MY	from ZIPmania II
"THE RACE"	CAPTAIN JACK	from Dancemania X4
"TURN ME ON (HEAVENLY MIX)"	E-ROTIC	from Dancemania SPEED 2
"UPSIDE DOWN"	COO COO	from Dancemania Super Classics 1
"VOL.4"	RAVERS CHOICE	from Dancemania SPEED 2
"WONDERLAND (UKS MIX)"	X-TREME	from Dancemania SUMMERS 2
Licensed Preview songs (2 total)
"BUMBLE BEE"	bambee	from Dancemania X5
"GIMME GIMME GIMME"	E-ROTIC	from Dancemania X5
New Konami Original songs (4 total)
"AFTER THE GAME OF LOVE"	NPD3	New Konami Original
"CUTIE CHASER"	CLUB SPICE	New Konami Original
"DROP THE BOMB"	Scotty D.	New Konami Original
"La Senorita Virtual"	2MB	New Konami Original
Konami Original songs (7 total)
"AFRONOVA"	RE-VENGE	from Dance Dance Revolution 3rdMix
"DEAD END"	N&S	from Dance Dance Revolution 3rdMix
"DYNAMITE RAVE"	NAOKI	from Dance Dance Revolution 3rdMix
"END OF THE CENTURY"	NO.9	from Dance Dance Revolution 3rdMix
"La Senorita"	CAPTAIN.T	from Dance Dance Revolution 3rdMix
"PARANOiA Rebirth"	190'	from Dance Dance Revolution 3rdMix
"Silent Hill"	THOMAS HOWARD	from Dance Dance Revolution 3rdMix
AMD Remix songs (4 total)
"gentle stress (AMD SEXUAL MIX)"	MR.DOG feat. DJ SWAN	from Dance Dance Revolution 3rdMix
"GRADIUSIC CYBER (AMD G5 MIX)"	BIG-O feat. TAKA	from Dance Dance Revolution 3rdMix
"Jam Jam Reggae (AMD SWING MIX)"	RICE.C feat. jam master '73	from Dance Dance Revolution 3rdMix
"LUV TO ME (AMD MIX)"	DJ KAZU feat. tiger YAMATO	from Dance Dance Revolution 3rdMix
Returning Konami Original songs (19 total)
"20, NOVEMBER (D.D.R. VERSION)"	N.M.R feat. DJ nagureo	from Dance Dance Revolution 2ndMix
"AM-3P"	KTz	from Dance Dance Revolution 2ndMix
"BRILLIANT 2U"	NAOKI	from Dance Dance Revolution 2ndMix
"BRILLIANT 2U (Orchestra Groove)"	NAOKI	from Dance Dance Revolution 2ndMix
"KEEP ON MOVIN'"	N.M.R	from Dance Dance Revolution 2ndMix
"LET THEM MOVE"	N.M.R	from Dance Dance Revolution 2ndMix
"LOVE THIS FEELIN'"	Chang Ma	from Dance Dance Revolution 2ndRemix (PS)
"MAKE A JAM!"	U1	from Dance Dance Revolution (PS)
"MAKE IT BETTER"	mitsu-O!	from Dance Dance Revolution
"MAKE IT BETTER (So-REAL Mix)"	mitsu-O!SUMMER	from Dance Dance Revolution 2ndMix
"PARANOiA"	180	from Dance Dance Revolution
"PARANOiA KCET ~clean mix~"	2MB	from Dance Dance Revolution (PS)
"PARANOiA MAX ~DIRTY MIX~"	190	from Dance Dance Revolution 2ndMix
"PUT YOUR FAITH IN ME"	UZI-LAY	from Dance Dance Revolution 2ndMix
"PUT YOUR FAITH IN ME (Jazzy Groove)"	UZI-LAY	from Dance Dance Revolution 2ndMix
"SP-TRIP MACHINE ~JUNGLE MIX~"	DE-SIRE	from Dance Dance Revolution 2ndMix
"think ya better D"	sAmi	from Dance Dance Revolution 2ndRemix (PS)
"TRIP MACHINE"	DE-SIRE	from Dance Dance Revolution
"TRIP MACHINE ~luv mix~"	2MB	from Dance Dance Revolution 2ndRemix (PS)

Dance Dance Revolution 4thMix PlayStation song list

Song	Artist	Note
Licensed songs (30 total)
"1,2,3,4,007"	NI-NI	from Dancemania X6
"BOYS (EURO MIX)"	SMiLE.dk	from Dancemania EURO☆MIX HAPPY PARADISE
"BUMBLE BEE"	bambee	from Dancemania X5
"DAM DARIRAM (KCP MIX)"	JOGA	from Dancemania SPEED 4
"DREAM A DREAM"	CAPTAIN JACK	from Dancemania X2
"EAT YOU UP"	ANGIE GOLD	from Dancemania Super Classics 1
"FOLLOW THE SUN (90 IN THE SHADE MIX)"	TRIPLE J	from Dancemania SPEED 2
"GIMME GIMME GIMME"	E-ROTIC	from Dancemania X5
"GOTCHA (The Theme from STARSKY & HUTCH)"	ANDY G's MAGIC DISCO MACHINE	from Dancemania SUMMERS 3
"HAVE YOU NEVER BEEN MELLOW (MM GROOVIN MIX)"	THE OLIVIA PROJECT	from Dancemania SPEED 4
"HERO (HAPPY GRANDALE MIX)"	PAPAYA	from Dancemania SPEED 4
"HERO (KCP DISCOTIQUE MIX)"	PAPAYA	from Dancemania BASS#6
"IF YOU WERE HERE (B4 ZA BEAT MIX)"	JENNIFER	from Dancemania SPEED 4
"IN THE HEAT OF THE NIGHT"	E-ROTIC	from Dancemania X7
"IT ONLY TAKES A MINUTE (Extended Remix)"	TAVARES	from Dancemania Super Classics 1
"KICK THE CAN"	BUS STOP	from ZIPmania III
"MUSIC"	HABEGALE	from Dancemania X4
"NEVER GONNA MAKE (FACTORY DANCE TEAM MIX)"	MORGANA	from Dancemania X6
"NIGHT IN MOTION"	CUBIC 22	from CLUB THE EARTH DISCO CLASSICS
"NINZABURO"	C.J.Crew feat.Sedge	from Dancemania SPEED 5
"ONE TWO (LITTLE BITCH)"	BUS STOP	from Dancemania X6
"ONLY YOU"	CAPTAIN JACK	from Dancemania BASS#6
"PINK DINOSAUR"	PAPAYA	from Dancemania X2
"SAINT GOES MARCHING (REMIX)"	THE SAINT	from Dancemania SPEED 4
"SHAKE YOUR BOOTY"	KC & THE SUNSHINE BAND	from Dancemania Club Classics 2
"SHOOTING STAR"	BANG	from Dancemania SPEED
"THE 7 JUMP"	KEN D	from Dancemania X7
"WALKIE TALKIE"	KING KONG & D.JUNGLE GIRLS	from Dancemania Super Classics 2
"XANADU"	OLIVIA PROJECT	from Dancemania 3
"Young Forever"	REBECCA	from Dancemania X6
Licensed Preview songs (2 total)
"DANCING ALL ALONE"	SMiLE.dk	from Dancemania X8
"SYNCHRONIZED LOVE (Red Monster Hyper Mix)"	JOE RINOIE	from Dance Maniax 2ndMix from Dancemania EURO MIX HAPPY PARADISE
New Konami Original songs (4 total)
"Groove"	Sho-T feat. Brenda	New Konami Original
"Midnite Blaze"	U1 Jewel Style	New Konami Original
"ORION.78 ~civilization mix~"	2MB	New Konami Original
"Share My Love"	Julie Frost	New Konami Original
Konami Original songs (9 total)
"B4U"	NAOKI	from Dance Dance Revolution 4thMix
"BABY BABY GIMME YOUR LOVE"	DIVAS	from Dance Dance Revolution 4thMix
"BURNIN' THE FLOOR"	NAOKI	from Dance Dance Revolution 4thMix
"HIGHER"	NM feat. SUNNY	from Dance Dance Revolution 4thMix
"HYPNΦTIC CRISIS"	BLUE DESTROYERS	from Dance Dance Revolution 4thMix
"LOVE AGAIN TONIGHT (For Melissa MIX)"	NAOKI feat. PAULA TERRY	from Dance Dance Revolution 4thMix
"MY SUMMER LOVE"	mitsu-O! with GEILA	from Dance Dance Revolution 4thMix
"ORION.78 (AMeuro-MIX)"	RE-VENGE	from Dance Dance Revolution 4thMix
"TRIP MACHINE CLIMAX"	DE-SIRE	from Dance Dance Revolution 4thMix
AMD Remix songs (2 total)
"Don't Stop! (AMD 2nd MIX)"	Dr.VIBE feat. JP miles	from Dance Dance Revolution 4thMix
"Get me in your sight (AMD CANCUN MIX)"	SYMPHONIC DEFOGGERS with 1479	from Dance Dance Revolution 4thMix
BEMANI crossover songs (7 total)
".59"	dj TAKA	from beatmania IIDX 2nd Style
"era (nostalmix)"	TaQ	from beatmania IIDX 3rd Style
"Holic"	TaQ	from beatmania IIDX 3rd Style
"LEADING CYBER"	dj TAKA	from beatmania IIDX 3rd Style
"Let's talk it over"	SHIN Murayama feat. Argie Phine	from beatmania IIDX 3rd Style
"Make Your Move"	good-cool feat. JP Miles	from beatmania IIDX 3rd Style
"never let you down"	good-cool feat. JP Miles	from beatmania IIDX 3rd Style

Dance Dance Revolution Extra Mix PlayStation song list

Song	Artist	Note
Licensed songs (34 total)
"CAFE"	D.D.SOUND	from Dancemania Super Classics 3
"CAT'S EYE (Ventura Mix)"	E-ROTIC	from Dance Maniax 2ndMix from Dancemania presents E-ROTIC MEGAMIX
"Club Tropicana"	Cydney D	from Dancemania BASS#4
"CONGA FEELING"	VIVIAN	from Dancemania SUMMERS 3
"DO ME (H.I.G.E.O MIX)"	MUSTACHE MEN	cover of Teddy Pendergrass
"DON'T CLOCK ME"	POPULA DEMAND feat. THE GET FRESH GIRLS	from Dancemania BASS#2
"DREAM A DREAM (MIAMI BOOTY MIX)"	CAPTAIN JACK	from Dancemania BASS#4
"DRILL INSTRUCTOR (C-Jah Happy Mix)"	CAPTAIN JACK	from Dancemania SPEED 3
"FREAKY"	DE LITE & MC YOUNG	from Dancemania BASS#3
"GET OFF"	WIZZZARD	from Dancemania BASS#0
"GET UP'N MOVE"	S & K	from Dancemania BASS#2
"HIGH ENERGY (John '00' Fleming Remix)"	SLIP & SHUFFLE featuring LEON	from Dancemania X3
"I DON'T WANT TO MISS A THING (Planet Lution Mix)	DEJA VU featuring TASMIN	from Dancemania SPEED 3
"I'M ALIVE"	CUT 'N' MOVE	from Dancemania DELUX
"I'M ALIVE"	UNCLE 36 SEC feat. MC TAIWAN	from Dancemania BASS#1
"KISS ME (KCP REMIX)"	E-ROTIC	from Dancemania SPEED 3
"KUNG FU FIGHTING (MIAMI BOOTY MIX)"	BUS STOP featuring CARL DOUGLAS	from Dancemania BASS#3
"LOVE MACHINE"	PONY TOWN BOYZ	from Dancemania BASS#4
"Lupin the 3rd '78"	VENTURA	from Dancemania presents J★PARADISE
"MY BABY MAMA"	ANQUETTE	from Dancemania BASS#3
"NA-NA"	BUS STOP	from Dancemania DIAMOND
"RHYTHM AND POLICE (K.O.G G3 MIX)"	CJ CREW feat. CHRISTIAN D.	from Dancemania SPEED BEST 2001
"SAMBA DE JANEIRO"	BASS FIST! feat. BOOGIE GIRL	from Dancemania BASS#1
"SKY HIGH"	DJ MIKO	from Dancemania X3
"SKY HIGH"	LUCYFER	from Dancemania EURO MIX HAPPY PARADISE
"STRUT YOUR FUNKY STUFF"	DIAMOND	from Dancemania BASS#5
"SYNCHRONIZED LOVE (Red Monster Hyper Mix)"	JOE RINOIE	from Dance Maniax 2ndMix from Dancemania EURO MIX HAPPY PARADISE
"TEMPLE OF LOVE"	E-ROTIC	from Dancemania X3
"THAT'S THE WAY '98"	DJ BASS feat. MC DIXIE	from Dancemania BASS#1
"THEME FROM ENTER THE DRAGON (Revival 2001 Mix)"	B3-PROJECT	cover of Lalo Schifrin
"TOGETHER & FOREVER"	CAPTAIN JACK	from Dancemania EXTRA
"TOGETHER & FOREVER"	NINEBALL feat. ATOMIC GUN & JULIA	from Dancemania BASS#1
"Typical Tropical"	BAMBEE	from Dancemania X3
"WONDA (SPEED K MIX)"	MM	from Dancemania SPEED BEST 2001
New Konami Original songs (2 total)
"Groove 2001"	Sho-T feat. Brenda	New Konami Original
"Let the beat hit em! (CLASSIC R&B STYLE)"	STONE BROS.	New Konami Original
DDR Solo crossover songs (7 total)
"CAN'T STOP FALLIN' IN LOVE"	NAOKI	from Dance Dance Revolution Solo 2000
"DROP OUT"	NW260	from Dance Dance Revolution Solo 2000
"HYSTERIA"	NAOKI 190	from Dance Dance Revolution Solo Bass Mix
"Let the beat hit em!"	STONE BROS.	from Dance Dance Revolution Solo Bass Mix
"PARANOIA EVOLUTION"	200	from Dance Dance Revolution Solo Bass Mix
"SUPER STAR"	D.J.RICH feat. Tail Bros.	from Dance Dance Revolution Solo Bass Mix
"WILD RUSH"	FACTOR-X	from Dance Dance Revolution Solo 2000
Dancing Stage True Kiss Destination crossover songs (2 total)
"CELEBRATE NITE"	N.M.R	from Dancing Stage featuring True Kiss Destination
"SEXY PLANET"	Crystal Aliens	from Dancing Stage featuring True Kiss Destination
BEMANI crossover song (1 total)
"Let the beat hit em! (BM II DX version)"	STONE BROS.	from beatmania IIDX 2nd Style
Preview songs (4 total)
"AFRONOVA PRIMEVAL"	8 bit	from Dance Maniax
"BROKEN MY HEART"	NAOKI feat. PAULA TERRY	from Dance Maniax
"DIVE"	BeForU	from Dance Dance Revolution 5thMix
"Remember You"	NM feat. Julie	from Dance Dance Revolution 5thMix

Dance Dance Revolution 5thMix PlayStation song list

Song	Artist	Note
Licensed songs (19 total)
"17才" (17 Sai)	BAMBEE	from Dancemania PRESENTS J★PARADISE
"AGAINST ALL ODDS (Definitive MIX)"	DEJAVU featuring TASMIN	from Dancemania X8
"BE TOGETHER"	NI-NI	from Dancemania PRESENTS J★PARADISE
"CAN'T STOP FALLIN' IN LOVE (SPEED MIX)"	NAOKI	from Dancemania SPEED 6
"DANCING ALL ALONE"	SMiLE.dk	from Dancemania X8
**"HOT LIMIT"**	**JOHN DESIRE**	**from Dancemania PRESENTS J★PARADISE**
"MOONLIGHT SHADOW (New Vocal Version)"	MISSING HEART	from Dancemania X8
"MOVIN ON (Extended Moon Mix)"	ELLEN GEE	from Dancemania X8
"MY GENERATION (Fat Beat Mix)"	CAPTAIN JACK	from Dancemania X8
"NEVER ENDING STORY (Power Club Vocal Mix)"	DJ AC/DC	from Dancemania X8
"NO LIMIT (RM Remix)"	2 UNLIMITED	from Dancemania DIAMOND
"おどるポンポコリン" (Odoru Pompokolin)	CAPTAIN JACK	from Dancemania PRESENTS J★PARADISE
**"OOPS!...I DID IT AGAIN (Fired Up MIX)"**	**ROCHELLE**	**from Dancemania X8**
"RIGHT NOW"	ATOMIC KITTEN	from Dancemania DIAMOND
"ロマンスの神様" (Romance no Kamisama)	JUDY CRYSTAL	from Dancemania PRESENTS J★PARADISE
"SWING IT"	BUS STOP	from Dancemania SUMMERS 2001
"TEST MY BEST"	E-ROTIC	from Dancemania X8
"The TWIST (Double Pump MIX)"	LIBERTY ALL STAZ	from Dancemania BASS#10 SUPER BEST
"TRIBAL DANCE (Almighty Mix)"	2 UNLIMITED	from Dancemania X8
Licensed Preview songs (2 total)
"NORI NORI NORI"	JUDY CRYSTAL	from Dancemania HAPPY PARADISE 2
"The Centre Of The Heart (STONEBRIDGE CLUBMIX)"	Roxette	from the album Room Service
New Konami Original songs (5 total)
"DIVE (more deep & deeper style)"	BeForU	New Konami Original
"Do It Right"	SOTA feat. Ebony Fay	New Konami Original
"Healing Vision (Angelic mix)"	2MB	New Konami Original
"Look To The Sky"	System S.F. feat.ANNA	New Konami Original
"ON THE JAZZ"	Jonny Dynamite!	New Konami Original
Konami Original songs (10 total)
**"B4U glorious style"**	**NAOKI**	**from Dance Dance Revolution 5thMix**
"DIVE"	BeForU	from Dance Dance Revolution 5thMix
**"DYNAMITE RAVE (Long ver.)"**	**NAOKI**	**from Dance Dance Revolution 5thMix**
"ECSTASY"	d-complex	from Dance Dance Revolution 5thMix
"Healing Vision"	DE-SIRE	from Dance Dance Revolution 5thMix
"INSERTiON"	NAOKI underground	from Dance Dance Revolution 5thMix
"祭 JAPAN" (Matsuri JAPAN)	RE-VENGE	from Dance Dance Revolution 5thMix
"PARANOiA ETERNAL"	STM200	from Dance Dance Revolution 5thMix
"Remember You"	NM	from Dance Dance Revolution 5thMix
"STILL IN MY HEART"	NAOKI	from Dance Dance Revolution 5thMix
BEMANI crossover songs (11 total)
"ABSOLUTE"	dj TAKA	from beatmania IIDX 4th Style
"Abyss"	dj TAKA	from beatmania IIDX 5th Style
"AFRONOVA PRIMEVAL"	8bit	from Dance Maniax
"BROKEN MY HEART"	NAOKI feat. PAULA TERRY	from Dance Maniax
"DXY!"	TaQ	from beatmania IIDX 4th Style
"Electro Tuned (the SubS mix)"	TaQ	from beatmania IIDX 2nd Style
"I Was The One"	good-cool	from beatmania IIDX 2nd Style
"Mr.T (take me higher)"	Risky Men feat. Asuka M	from beatmania IIDX 4th Style
"Radical Faith"	TaQ	from beatmania IIDX 5th Style
"サナ・モレッテ・ネ・エンテ" (Sana Mollete Ne Ente)	Togo Project feat. Sana	from beatmania APPEND GOTTAMIX 2 ~Going Global~
"THE CUBE"	DJ SUWAMI	from beatmania IIDX 5th Style

- indicates that the songs need to be unlocked.
- **Bold** indicates long versions.

== Reception ==
Reception

Review scores
Publication	Score
Famitsu	31/40 (PlayStation); 30/40 (Dreamcast)
GameSpot	8.1/10
IGN	8.0/10
Next Generation	4/5

In Japan, Game Machine listed Dance Dance Revolution on their December 1, 1998 issue as being the most-successful dedicated arcade game of the month. Along with its 2ndMix update, Dance Dance Revolution became the highest-grossing dedicated arcade game of 1999 in Japan. The game sold over 10,000 arcade cabinets by 1999.

The PlayStation version sold 1.27 million units in Japan and 135,048 units in the United States, for a combined 1,405,048 units sold.

Blake Fischer reviewed the PlayStation version of the game for Next Generation, rating it four stars out of five, and stated that "If you're looking for a fresh new experience with your PlayStation that's tons of fun and will make you the life of the party, this is your game. Just expect a rough learning curve."

On release, Famitsu magazine scored the PlayStation version of the game a 31 out of 40, and the Dreamcast version a 30 out of 40.

On release, Famitsu magazine scored the game a 34 out of 40. The successful DDR series began with the 1998/1999 release of this game, and its popularity can be attributed to the innovative connection between a dancing stage and the need for the player to move their body to match the instructions on the screen.

In 2022, The Strong National Museum of Play inducted Dance Dance Revolution to its World Video Game Hall of Fame.
