= List of Dutch Top 40 number-one singles of 1996 =

These hits topped the Dutch Top 40 in 1996 (see 1996 in music).

Issue date	Artist	Song	Ref.
6 January	Linda, Roos & Jessica	Ademnood	
13 January	Linda, Roos & Jessica	Ademnood	
20 January	Linda, Roos & Jessica	Ademnood	
27 January	Linda, Roos & Jessica	Ademnood	
3 February	Luniz	I Got 5 on It	
10 February	Party Animals	Have You Ever Been Mellow	
17 February	Fluitsma & Van Tijn	15 miljoen mensen	
24 February	Fluitsma & Van Tijn	15 miljoen mensen	
2 March	Guus Meeuwis & Vagant	Per spoor (Kedeng kedeng)	
9 March	Guus Meeuwis & Vagant	Per spoor (Kedeng kedeng)	
16 March	Guus Meeuwis & Vagant	Per spoor (Kedeng kedeng)	
23 March	Guus Meeuwis & Vagant	Per spoor (Kedeng kedeng)	
30 March	Captain Jack	Captain Jack	
6 April	Captain Jack	Captain Jack	
13 April	Captain Jack	Captain Jack	
20 April	Captain Jack	Captain Jack	
27 April	Party Animals	Hava Naquila	
4 May	Party Animals	Hava Naquila	
11 May	Party Animals	Hava Naquila	
18 May	Captain Jack	Drill Instructor	
25 May	Captain Jack	Drill Instructor	
1 June	Captain Jack	Drill Instructor	
8 June	Los del Río	Macarena	
15 June	Los del Río	Macarena	
22 June	Los del Río	Macarena	
29 June	Los del Río	Macarena	
6 July	The Fugees	Killing Me Softly	
13 July	The Fugees	Killing Me Softly	
20 July	The Fugees	Killing Me Softly	
27 July	The Fugees	Killing Me Softly	
3 August	The Fugees	Killing Me Softly	
10 August	The Fugees	Killing Me Softly	
17 August	Party Animals	Aquarius	
24 August	Party Animals	Aquarius	
31 August	Party Animals	Aquarius	
7 September	Spice Girls	Wannabe	
14 September	Spice Girls	Wannabe	
21 September	Rob de Nijs	Banger hart	
28 September	Rob de Nijs	Banger hart	
5 October	Rob de Nijs	Banger hart	
12 October	Rob de Nijs	Banger hart	
19 October	Rob de Nijs	Banger hart	
26 October	The Kelly Family	I Can't Help Myself	
2 November	The Kelly Family	I Can't Help Myself	
9 November	The Kelly Family	I Can't Help Myself	
16 November	The Kelly Family	I Can't Help Myself	
23 November	The Kelly Family	I Can't Help Myself	
30 November	The Kelly Family	I Can't Help Myself	
7 December	Hakkûhbar	Gabbertje	
14 December	Hakkûhbar	Gabbertje	
21 December	Hakkûhbar	Gabbertje	
28 December	No Doubt	Don't Speak	

== See also ==
- 1996 in music
