= Little Boy (Captain Jack song) =

Single by Captain Jack

from the album The Mission
- B-side: "Remix"
- Released: 13 September 1996
- Studio: Beatdisaster Studios
- Genre: Eurodance
- Length: 3:25
- Label: CDL - Cologne Dance Label; EMI Electrola
- Songwriters: Franky Gee; Liza da Costa; Richard Witte; Udo Niebergall
- Producer: Udo Niebergall

Captain Jack singles chronology
"Soldier, Soldier" (1996)	"Little Boy" (1996)	"Another One Bites the Dust" (1996)

Music video
- "Little Boy" on YouTube

"Little Boy" is a song recorded by the German Eurodance group Captain Jack. It was released in September 1996, by CDL and EMI Electrola, as the fourth and final single from their album, The Mission (1996). The song is co-written by group members Franky Gee and Liza da Costa and became a top-10 hit in the Netherlands, a top-20 hit in Finland and a top-30 hit in Germany. On the Eurochart Hot 100, "Little Boy" reached number 73 in October 1996. The accompanying music video was directed by Oliver Sommer and filmed in Berlin, Germany.

== Track listings ==
- 12-inch vinyl, Germany (1996)

A1. "Little Boy" (Captain´s Dance Mix) — 5:40
A2. "Little Boy" (Video Mix) — 3:50
B1. "Little Boy" (Rave-O-Lution Mix) — 6:45
B2. "Little Boy" (Boy Oh Boy Mix) — 3:41

- CD single, Germany (1996)
1. "Little Boy" (Radio Mix) — 3:25
2. "Little Boy" (Captain's Dance Mix) — 5:17
- CD maxi-single, Europe (1996)
1. "Little Boy" (Radio Mix) — 3:25
2. "Little Boy" (Captain's Dance Mix) — 5:17
3. "Little Boy" (Boy Oh Boy Mix) — 5:41
4. "Little Boy" (Rave-O-Lution Mix) — 6:45
5. "Little Boy" (Video Mix) — 3:50
- CD maxi-single (Remix), Europe (1996)
1. "Little Boy" (Temple Of Light Remix) — 6:30
2. "Little Boy" (Agualite Remix) — 5:37
3. "Captain Jack" (Futuretraxx Remix) — 5:48

== Charts ==
=== Weekly charts ===
Chart (1996)	Peak position
Austria (Ö3 Austria Top 40)	31
Belgium (Ultratop 50 Flanders)	46
Europe (Eurochart Hot 100)	73
Europe (European Dance Radio)	20
Finland (Suomen virallinen lista)	16
Germany (GfK)	27
Netherlands (Dutch Top 40)	8
Netherlands (Single Top 100)	10
Switzerland (Schweizer Hitparade)	50

=== Year-end charts ===
Chart (1996)	Position
Netherlands (Dutch Top 40)	82
