= Oha Suta Dance Dance Revolution =

2000 video game

Oha Star Dance Dance Revolution
- Cover art
- Developer(s): Konami
- Publisher(s): Konami
- Series: Dance Dance Revolution
- Engine: DDR 3rdMix
- Platform(s): PlayStation
- Release: JP: September 14, 2000
- Genre(s): Music, exergaming
- Mode(s): Single-player, multiplayer

Oha Star Dance Dance Revolution (おはスタダンスダンスレボリューション, Oha Suta Dansu Dansu Reboryūshon) is a Dance Dance Revolution game for the Sony PlayStation console. The game features songs from the Japanese children's TV show Oha Star. There is no arcade counterpart.

== Music ==
Oha Suta Dance Dance Revolution, primarily consists of songs from Oha Suta, but the game also includes a number of Konami Originals, such as "Cutie Chaser (Morning Mix)", "Brilliant 2U", "Keep On Movin'" and "Make a Jam!".

Song	Artist	Note
Oha Suta Licenses
"CANDY"	WARUJIENNU	OHA STUDIO BEST ~vol. 2~
"HAPPY GO LUCKY"	YAMACHAN WITH JIMUSASUHIKARU	OHA STUDIO BEST ~vol. 2~
"O-HA! MAMBO -A SHINY NEW TODAY-"	WARUJIENNU	OHA STUDIO BEST ~vol. 2~
"OHA OHA SUTAATAA"	YAMACHAN & REIMONDO	OHA STUDIO BEST ~vol. 1~
"OHA SKA!"	OHA KIDS WITH IMAKUNI	OHA STUDIO BEST ~vol. 1~
"SAYONARA NO KAWARI NI"	OHHAGUMI	OHA SUTA THE SUPER KIDS STATION SINGLE
"WHY! -THE ZONA'S SONG-"	MORIKUBO SHOUTAROU	OHA STUDIO BEST ~vol. 1~
"ZONAPARA -WHY! PARAPARA REMIX-"	ZOBEKKA	OHA SUTA THE SUPER KIDS STATION SINGLE
Konami Original
"CUTIE CHASER (MORNING MIX)"	CLUB SPICE	New Konami Original
From previous versions
"MAKE A JAM!"	U1	from Dance Dance Revolution (PS)
"BRILLIANT 2U"	NAOKI	from Dance Dance Revolution 2ndMix
"KEEP ON MOVIN"	NMR	from Dance Dance Revolution 2ndMix
