= The Mission (Captain Jack album) =

Studio album by Captain Jack
- Released: February 26, 1996
- Recorded: 1995
- Genre: Eurodance
- Length: 67:46
- Label: Toshiba, Cologne Dance Label
- Producer: Francisco Gutierrez, Udo Niebergall, Eric Schnecko

Captain Jack chronology
The Mission (1996)	Operation Dance (1997)

Singles from The Mission
- 1. "Captain Jack" Released: 27 July 1995; 2. "Drill Instructor" Released: 8 March 1996; 3. "Soldier, Soldier" Released: 30 May 1996; 4. "Little Boy" Released: 13 September 1996

The Mission is Captain Jack's first album, released in 1996. It features female singer Liza da Costa. Four singles were released from the album: "Captain Jack", "Drill Instructor", "Soldier, Soldier", and "Little Boy".

== Track listing ==
1. "The Mission (Intro)" – 1:04
2. "Sir Yes Sir (Pt-Mix)" – 4:07
3. "Captain Jack (Short Mix)" – 4:06
4. "Soldier Soldier (Short Summer Mix)" – 3:34
5. "Little Boy (Boy Oh Boy Mix)" – 3:41
6. "Drill Instructor (Short Mix)" – 4:12
7. "Take On Me (Longplay)" – 5:26 – A-ha cover
8. "Captain's Dream (Instrumental Mix)" – 4:02
9. "Jack In Da House (Jack Da House Mix)" – 4:10
10. "Back Home (Captain's Return)" – 5:16
11. "She's A Lady (Sing Nanana Mix)" – 3:14
12. "Captain Jack Remix (House Grooves From UK Mix)" – 6:42
13. "Drill Instructor Remix (All 4 One Mix)" – 6:13
14. "Jack In Da House (Old School Mix)" – 6:09
15. "The Final Countdown (Uuh Baby Mix)" – 5:37

== Charts ==
Chart	Peak position
Austrian Albums Chart	27
Belgian Albums Chart (Vl)	48
Dutch Albums Chart	2
Finnish Albums Chart	3
German Albums Chart	11
Hungarian Albums Chart	7
Norway Albums Chart	8
Swiss Albums Chart	22

=== Year-end charts ===
Chart (1996)	Position
German Albums Chart	35

=== Certifications ===
Region	Certification	Certified units/sales
Finland (Musiikkituottajat)	Platinum	57,986
Germany (BVMI)	Gold	250,000^{^}
Netherlands (NVPI)	Platinum	100,000^{^}
Poland (ZPAV)	Platinum	100,000^{*}
^{*} Sales figures based on certification alone.^{^} Shipments figures based on certification alone.

== Personnel ==
- Franky Gee — vocals
- Liza da Costa — vocals
