= Centerfold (disambiguation) =

The centerfold of a magazine is a picture printed on a single sheet of paper and inserted in the middle of the publication.

Centerfold may also refer to:

- Centerfold (group), a Dutch girl band
- "Centerfold" (song), a 1981 song by The J. Geils Band
- "Centerfold", a song from the 2006 album I'm Not Dead by Pink
- "Centerfold", a song from the 2002 album Party Warriors by Captain Jack
- "Centrefolds", a song from the 2003 album Sleeping with Ghosts by Placebo
