= Dance Dance Revolution Solo =

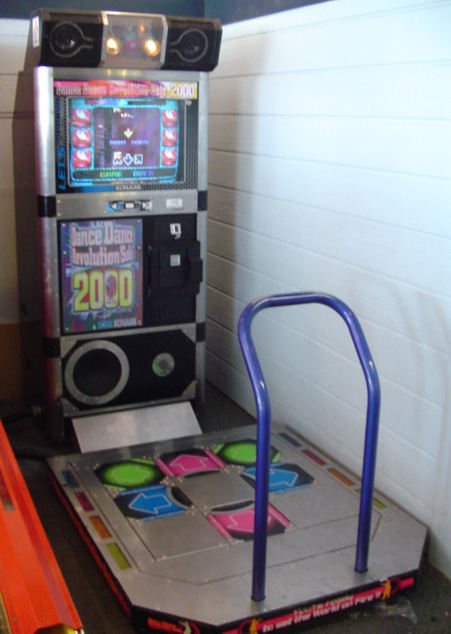
- Dance Dance Revolution Solo 2000 arcade machine
- Genre(s): Music, Exercise
- Developer(s): Konami
- Publisher(s): Konami
- First release: Dance Dance Revolution Solo Bass Mix; August 19, 1999
- Latest release: Dance Dance Revolution Solo 4thMix Plus; December 28, 2000
- Parent series: Dance Dance Revolution

Dance Dance Revolution Solo is a series of games spun off of the main Dance Dance Revolution series. It consists of three arcade releases in Japan. The game mode was also adapted for use in a children's arcade version and two console releases (as a game mode).

== Gameplay ==
Gameplay in the Solo series is nearly identical to that of the main Dance Dance Revolution series, but with a few differences to optimize the game for single-player mode. In addition to the four-panel mode offered in the main series, Solo adds a three-panel mode in its Bass Mix and 2000 releases, as well as a six-panel mode in all of its releases. Both modes add two new panels: up-left and up-right. The three-panel mode adds the down arrow to these, while the six-panel mode combines both the four traditional panels and the two new panels.

== Games ==
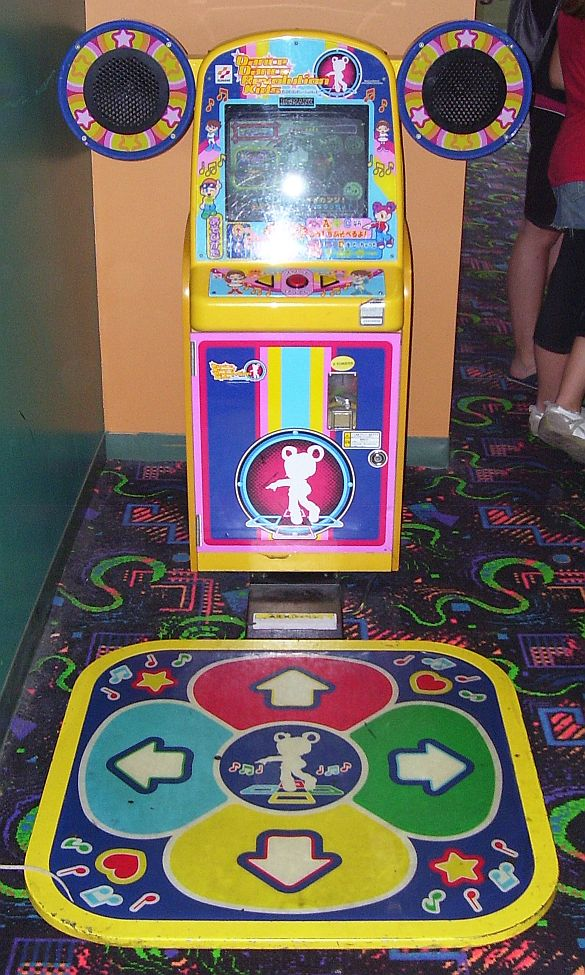
Dance Dance Revolution Kids adapts elements from Solo for a younger audience.

=== Main series ===
==== Dance Dance Revolution Solo Bass Mix ====
Dansu Dansu Reboryūshon Soro Bēsu Mikkusu (ダンスダンスレボリューションソロベースミックス) is the first game in the series. It was released as an arcade game by Konami on August 19, 1999 in Japan. The game premiered 16 songs to the series and takes its name, as well as most of its soundtrack, from the Dancemania BASS albums. This is the first game that features a live-action intro.

==== Dance Dance Revolution Solo 2000 ====
Dansu Dansu Reboryūshonsoro Tsū Sauzando (ダンスダンスレボリューションソロ2000) the second game in the series. It was released as an arcade game by Konami on December 16, 1999 in Japan. DDR Solo 2000 premiered 20 songs to the series and also featured all 16 songs from Bass Mix, for a total of 36 songs.

==== Dance Dance Revolution Solo 4thMix ====
This game and Dance Dance Revolution Solo 4thMix Plus were released concurrently with 4thMix and 4thMix Plus respectively, designed for use with Solo cabinets. The changes in the actual game engine are few, but significant. The 4 and 6-panel modes are offered instead of the usual options, and the chubby arrows of the Solo series also appear. Multi-player Mode from the Solo series is not present in either game.

=== Derivatives ===
While not Solo releases per se, these games offer a one-player mode inspired by Solo.

- Dance Dance Revolution Extra Mix for the PlayStation in Japan featured a total of 50 songs: 33 of the 36 songs from Solo 2000, plus 11 songs that premiered in 4thMix Plus, four previews from 5thMix and two songs that later premiered in DDRMAX 6thMix. Of these, only the Solo 2000 and 4thMix Plus songs include Solo steps, though Edit Mode allows players to create custom Solo steps for any of the 50 songs.
- Dance Dance Revolution Konamix for the PlayStation is the first release in North America to feature a Solo mode.
- Dance Dance Revolution Kids Dansu Dansu Reboryūshon Kizzu (ダンスダンスレボリューションキッズ), sometimes abbreviated as DDR Kids (DDRキッズ, Dī Dī Ā Kizzu), is a game in the Dance Dance Revolution series aimed at a younger audience. Released in December 2000 by Konami for the Japanese arcade rooms, DDR Kids is limited in comparison to the main series. Only one player can play at a time, the steps are very simplistic and it's easier to score a passing grade. The arcade machine is smaller than a typical DDR machine, designed for smaller players. The song selection is also limited with only a couple of tracks from the main series. The rest are mostly exclusive to this release and feature theme songs to children's shows that have aired in Japan.
- Dancing Karaoke DKara was released on January 16, 2001. It combined the gameplay of Dance Dance Revolution with karaoke style singing. Konami had previously released two titles with similar gameplay in the past as very rare arcade machines. The song selection was primarily download driven and features a unique set of music that has not been repeated in any other DDR game. The downloadable songs were sold for ¥150 a song and released in packs of varying size a week or so apart from each other. As of August 9, 2001 the total number of songs available for DKara including the original game and downloadable content was 80, however an undetermined number of songs have been released since then. A newer release, Karaoke Revolution Party, features similar gameplay.

== Music ==
=== Songs ===
All songs from Solo BASSMIX can also be played in Solo 2000.

Song	Artist
Dance Dance Revolution Solo Bass Dancemania Licenses (12 total)
"LOVE MACHINE"	PONY TOWN BOYZ
"FREAKY"	DE LITE & MC YOUNG
"Club Tropicana"	Cydney D
"KUNG FU FIGHTING (MIAMI BOOTY MIX)"	BUS STOP featuring CARL DOUGLAS
"SAMBA DE JANEIRO"	BASS FIST! feat. BOOGIE GIRL
"DON'T CLOCK ME"	POPULA DEMAND feat. THE GET FRESH GIRLS
"GET OFF †"	WIZZZZARD
"THAT'S THE WAY '98 †"	DJ BASS feat. MC DIXIE
"I'M ALIVE"	UNCLE 36 SEC feat. MC TAIWAN
"TOGETHER & FOREVER †"	NINEBALL feat. ATOMIC GUN & JULIA
"MY BABY MAMA"	ANQUETTE
"GET UP'N MOVE"	S & K
Dance Dance Revolution Solo Bass Konami Originals (4 total)
"PARANOIA EVOLUTION"	200
"HYSTERIA"	200
"Let the beat hit em!"	Stone Bros.
"SUPER STARS"	D.J.RICH feat. Tail Bros.
Dance Dance Revolution Solo 2000 Dancemania Licenses (11 total)
"I'M ALIVE"	CUT 'N' MOVE
"HIGH ENERGY (John '00' Fleming Remix)"	SLIP & SHUFFLE featuring LEON
"SKY HIGH"	DJ MIKO
"TEMPLE OF LOVE"	E-ROTIC
"DRILL INSTRUCTOR (C-Jah Happy Mix)"	CAPTAIN JACK
"KISS ME (KCP REMIX)"	E-ROTIC
"DREAM A DREAM (MIAMI BOOTY MIX)"	CAPTAIN JACK
"I DON'T WANT TO MISS A THING (Planet Lution Mix)"	DEJA VU featuring TASMIN
"TOGETHER & FOREVER" †	CAPTAIN JACK
"Typical Tropical"	BAMBEE
"STRUT YOUR FUNKY STUFF"	DIAMOND
Dance Dance Revolution Solo 2000 Konami Originals (9 total)
"think ya better D"	sAmi
"CAN'T STOP FALLIN' IN LOVE"	NAOKI
"CELEBRATE NITE"	N.M.R
"WILD RUSH"	FACTOR-X
"SEXY PLANET"	Crystal Aliens
"LOVE THIS FEELIN'"	Chang Ma
"TRIP MACHINE ～luv mix～"	2MB
"DROP OUT"	NW260
"Let the beat hit em! (BM IIDX version)"	Stone Bros.
† indicates a song exclusive to Japan, unavailable in the USA location test and the rest of Asia.

Dance Dance Revolution Kids

- アンパンマンマーチ (♪)
- ウルトラマンガイア (♪)
- おどるポンポコリン (♪♪)
- ターゲット～赤い衝撃～(♪♪♪)
- ダメダメのうた (♪♪)
- プラチナ (♪♪♪♪)
- めざせ! ポケモンマスター (♪)
- SHAKE (♪♪♪♪)
- 全部抱きしめて (♪♪)
- LOVEマシーン (♪♪♪)
- WAになっておどろう (♪♪)

Dancing Karaoke DKara

Dancing Karaoke DKara soundtrack
Song	Artist or Type
A·B·Cのうた	~TRADITIONAL~
TWINKLE TWINKLE LITTLE STAR	~TRADITIONAL~
Downloadable Songs (January 16, 2001)
Another Chance	宇多田 ヒカル
Automatic	宇多田 ヒカル
B&C -Album Version-	宇多田 ヒカル
Movin' on without you	宇多田 ヒカル
Secret of my heart	倉木 麻衣
Stay by my side	倉木 麻衣
Boys & girls	浜崎 あゆみ
Depend on you	浜崎 あゆみ
poker face	浜崎 あゆみ
SEASONS	浜崎 あゆみ
SURREAL	浜崎 あゆみ
Trauma	浜崎 あゆみ
WHATEVER	浜崎 あゆみ
Good Morning!	モーニング娘。
LOVEマシーン	モーニング娘。
恋のダンスサイト	モーニング娘。
サマーナイトタウン	モーニング娘。
抱いてHOLD ON ME!	モーニング娘。
真夏の光線	モーニング娘。
モーニングコーヒー	モーニング娘。
教えてMr.Sky	藤崎 詩織
ガッチャマンの歌	子門 真人
ゲッターロボ!	ささきいさお
鉄腕アトム	コロムビアゆりかご会
マジンガーZ	水木 一郎
めざせポケモンマスター	松本 梨香
レッツゴー!!ライダーキック	藤 浩一/メール・ハーモニー
Downloadable Songs (January 30, 2001)
I miss you ~時を越えて~	MISIA+DCT
Downloadable Songs (February 1, 2001)
LOVE IS ENERGY!	EE JUMP
サボテン	ポルノグラフィティ
恋愛レボリューション21(にじゅういち)	モーニング娘。
Graduater	椎名 へきる
Downloadable Songs (February 16, 2001)
ラッキープール	JUDY AND MARY
ミニモニ。ジャンケンぴょん!	ミニモニ。
I'm here saying nothing	矢井田 瞳
lost in you	林原 めぐみ
マメシバ	坂本 真綾
Downloadable Songs (March 1, 2001)
口唇	GLAY
春 ~spring~	Hysteric Blue
ちょこっとLOVE	プッチモニ
Be cool!	野猿
STAY AWAY	L'Arc~en~Ciel
Downloadable Songs (March 15, 2001)
Can You Keep A Secret?	宇多田 ヒカル
明日があるさ(ジョージアで行きましょう編)	ウルフルズ
宇宙戦艦ヤマト	ささきいさお/ロイヤル・ナイツ
Downloadable Songs (March 29, 2001)
ダイナマイト	SMAP
蒼い霹靂	TM. Revolution
Mysterious Eyes	GARNET CROW
Downloadable Songs (April 12, 2001)
Get Wild	TMN
ultra soul	B'z
BABY! 恋にKNOCK OUT!	プッチモニ
ルパン三世のテーマ	ビート・マック・ジュニア
Downloadable Songs (April 26, 2001)
FAITH	愛内 里菜
愛のバカやろう	後藤 真希
Fish Fight!	野猿
残酷な天使のテーゼ	高橋 洋子
Downloadable Songs (May 17, 2001)
GLOBAL COMMUNICATION	GLAY
Stand Up	倉木 麻衣
永遠にアムロ	池田鴻/フィーリングフリー
Downloadable Songs (May 31, 2001)
DEEP DEEP	小柳 ゆき
遥か	スピッツ
YATTA!	はっぱ隊
走れ正直者	西城 秀樹
Downloadable Songs (June 14, 2001)
Perfect Love	MAX
ウルトラマン タロウ	武村太郎/少年少女合唱団みずうみ
忍者ハットリくん	堀 絢子
Downloadable Songs (June 28, 2001)
Body&Soul	SPEED
White Love	SPEED
Set Me Free!	今井 絵理子
Downloadable Songs (July 12, 2001)
I'm proud	華原 朋美
Ride on time	MAX
SUPER SONIC DANCE	move
Downloadable Songs (July 26, 2001)
チュッ!夏パ～ティ	三人祭
サマーれげぇ!レインボー	7人祭
ダンシング!夏祭り	10人祭
Downloadable Songs (August 9, 2001)
イノセントワールド	Mr.Children
everybody goes ~秩序のない世界にドロップキック~	Mr.Children
シーソーゲーム ~勇敢な恋の歌~	Mr.Children

=== Courses ===
Nonstop	Songs
NONSTOP A	1. "GET UP'N MOVE"
NONSTOP A	2. "SAMBA DE JANEIRO"
NONSTOP A	3. "DON'T CLOCK ME"
NONSTOP B †	1. "THAT'S THE WAY '98"
NONSTOP B †	2. "GET OFF"
NONSTOP B †	3. "TOGETHER & FOREVER"
NONSTOP C	1. "BRILLIANT 2U"
NONSTOP C	2. "SP-TRIP MACHINE"
NONSTOP C	3. "PARANOIA EVOLUTION"
NONSTOP D	1. "CLUB TROPICANA"
NONSTOP D	2. "KUNG FU FIGHTING (MIAMI BOOTY MIX)"
NONSTOP D	3. "FREAKY"
NONSTOP E	1. "I'M ALIVE"
NONSTOP E	2. "MY BABY MAMA"
NONSTOP E	3. "LOVE MACHINE"
NONSTOP F	1. "Let the beat hit em!"
NONSTOP F	2. "SUPER STAR"
NONSTOP F	3. "HYSTERIA"
NONSTOP G ‡	1. "DYNAMITE RAVE"
NONSTOP G ‡	2. "CELEBRATE NITE"
NONSTOP G ‡	3. "CAN'T STOP FALLIN' IN LOVE"
NONSTOP H ‡	1. "think ya better D"
NONSTOP H ‡	2. "TRIP MACHINE ~luv mix~"
NONSTOP H ‡	3. "LOVE THIS FEELIN'"
NONSTOP I ‡	1. "AFRONOVA"
NONSTOP I ‡	2. "WILD RUSH"
NONSTOP I ‡	3. "DROP OUT"
† indicates a course exclusive to Japan.
‡ indicates courses that are exclusive to Solo 2000.

=== Soundtrack ===
A combined soundtrack for both DDR Solo mixes was released by Toshiba-EMI under their Dancemania dance music brand. It contains 35 tracks from the game and all 9 megamixes.

== Controversy ==
In 2002, a bowling alley in San Diego, California removed a Solo 2000 machine after Jennifer Stoefen and several members of a local group, known as Youth Advocacy Coalition (YAC), complained that the background movies of selected songs contained images that could promote substance abuse, such as a scantily clad nurse and pills in "I'm Alive" and alcoholic drinks appearing in "Club Tropicana". The news received coverage on FOX 6 News and NBC 7/39 News.

Other arcades also opted to replace their Solo 2000 machines with DDRMAX Dance Dance Revolution 6thMix or its sequel, which do not feature the nurse theme and alcohol references, but do include profanity in a few songs. Konami responded by warning arcades that such machines are illegally imported. Using the DDR Freak fan site, the YAC located other Solo 2000 machines and considered contacting the operators, asking for the games to be removed or replaced. DDR Freak published a statement criticizing the news reports for their lack of journalistic objectivity and denying allegations of Dance Dance Revolution promoting substance abuse. The community pointed out that Solo 2000 is portraying a medical theme, and that fighting and shooting arcade games such as Street Fighter and The House of the Dead have moderate to strong life-like violence.

== See also ==
- Dance Dance Revolution
- Oha Suta Dance Dance Revolution, also designed for kids
