= Soldier, Soldier (song) =

1996 single by Captain Jack

Single by Captain Jack

from the album The Mission
- Released: 30 May 1996
- Length: 3:34
- Label: CDL – Cologne Dance Label; EMI Electrola
- Songwriters: Liza da Costa; Udo Niebergall; Richard Witte
- Producer: Udo Niebergall

Captain Jack singles chronology
"Drill Instructor" (1996)	"Soldier, Soldier" (1996)	"Little Boy" (1996)

Music video
- "Soldier Soldier" on YouTube

"Soldier, Soldier" is a song by German Eurodance group Captain Jack, released in May 1996 as the third single from their first album, The Mission (1996). The song was co-written by group member Liza da Costa with Richard Witte and producer Udo Niebergall. It became a moderate success in several European countries, particularly in the Czech Republic and the Netherlands, peaking at number three in both countries. The accompanying music video was directed by Mark Glaeser for Neue Sentimental Film and filmed on the island of Saint Barthélemy in the Caribbean.

== Charts ==
=== Weekly charts ===
Chart (1996)	Peak position
Austria (Ö3 Austria Top 40)	13
Belgium (Ultratop 50 Flanders)	21
Czech Republic (IFPI CR)	3
Europe (Eurochart Hot 100)	19
Europe (European Dance Radio)	14
Finland (Suomen virallinen lista)	6
Germany (GfK)	11
Netherlands (Dutch Top 40)	4
Netherlands (Single Top 100)	3
Switzerland (Schweizer Hitparade)	12

=== Year-end charts ===
Chart (1996)	Position
Germany (Media Control)	69
Netherlands (Dutch Top 40)	54
Netherlands (Single Top 100)	47

== Release history ==
Region	Date	Format(s)	Label(s)	Ref.
Europe	30 May 1996	CD	CDL – Cologne Dance Label; EMI Electrola	
Japan	4 September 1996	CD	EMI; CDL – Cologne Dance Label; Intercord Japan	
