= Dance Dance Revolution 2ndMix =

1999 video game

- Developer: Konami
- Publisher: Konami
- Series: Dance Dance Revolution
- Platforms: Arcade, PlayStation, Dreamcast
- Release: Arcade: JP: January 29, 1999; PlayStation: JP: August 26, 1999; Dreamcast: JP: February 17, 2000
- Genres: Music, Exercise
- Modes: Single-player, Multiplayer
- Arcade system: Bemani System 573 Analog

Dance Dance Revolution 2ndMix (ダンスダンスレボリューションセカンドミックス, Dansu Dansu Reboryūshon SekandoMikkusu), sometimes abbreviated as 2ndMix (セカンドミックス, SekandoMikkusu), is the second game in the Dance Dance Revolution series of music video games. It was released as an arcade game by Konami on January 29, 1999. The initial release has a total of 33 songs: 22 brand new songs, and 11 from its predecessor, Dance Dance Revolution (1998 video game).

== Gameplay ==
The core gameplay and scoring system of 2ndMix is the same as the previous version of Dance Dance Revolution. The arrows in 2ndMix do not have different color-cycles based on their time signature. The "Vivid" arrow colors familiar to players of later mixes were not introduced until the club versions. All foot panel mods have been turned off and the difficulty and style of a song cannot be changed.

== Variants ==
=== Best of Cool Dancers ===
Dance Dance Revolution: Best of Cool Dancers (ダンスダンスレボリューション ベストオブクールダンサーズ, Dansu Dansu Reboryūshon: Besuto obu Kūru Dansāzu) is a music video game by Konami. It was revealed on February 11, 1999, at select locations in Japan and was used solely for ranking Dance Dance Revolution players prior to a company-held tournament. The game featured only four songs, all four of which are from previous releases and runs off of a Dance Dance Revolution 2ndMix machine. The four songs of Dance Dance Revolution Best of Cool Dancers each have a set level of difficulty and style of play. Each song is used for a specific round in the tournament qualifications.

No.	Song	Artist	Notes	From
1	"Let's Get Down"	JT Playaz	Preliminary stage, song only playable on Single/Basic.	from Dancemania 9
2	"Butterfly"	Smile.dk	Quarter-final stage, song only playable on Double/Another.	from Dancemania 10
3	"Little Bitch"	The Specials	Semi-final stage, song only playable on Single/Basic.	from Dancemania SUMMERS
4	"Paranoia"	180	Tournament Final stage, song only playable on Single/Another.	from Dance Dance Revolution (Konami Original)

=== Link Version ===
Dance Dance Revolution 2ndMix Dreamcast Edition for the Japanese Dreamcast

Dance Dance Revolution 2ndMix Link Version (ダンスダンスレボリューションセカンドミックスリンクバージョン, Dansu Dansu Reboryūshon SecandoMikkusu Rinku Bājon), released on April 28, 1999, introduced the ability for players to save high scores and play custom step edits using their PlayStation memory cards. A player would first need to format the memory card with "Link Data" using the home version of 2ndMix, and then insert the card into one of two slots on the front of the arcade cabinet. Link Version includes 5 new songs, in addition to the full 2ndMix song list. After the release of Link Version, Link Data features had been implemented in every future DDR version for the System 573. Dance Dance Revolution SuperNOVA originally planned to include PlayStation 2 memory card support, but the functionality was removed and replaced with e-Amusement instead, albeit only for Asia.

=== 2ndRemix ===
Dance Dance Revolution 2ndReMix (ダンスダンスレボリューションセカンドリミックス, Dansu Dansu Reboryūshon SekandoRiMikkusu), the home version of 2ndMix, was released in Japan on August 26, 1999, for the Sony PlayStation. It includes 34 songs, seven of which are new to this version and are hidden and unlockable. Two of the hidden songs were previews of the next arcade version, Dance Dance Revolution 3rdMix and can only be played on Basic difficulty.

The home version has the ability to disc change to 1st and Append Club version. It also allows to unlock features in previous mixes such as the nonstop ranking from 3rd Mix. The interface is still the same as the one used in 2ndMix.

=== Dreamcast ===
On February 17, 2000, Konami released a version of Dance Dance Revolution 2ndMix for the Dreamcast console. It features 43 songs, seven of which are hidden and unlockable. The song list includes seven songs from Dance Dance Revolution 3rdMix.

=== Dance Dance Revolution (2001) ===
Most of the songs in 2ndMix (with the exception of "BAD GIRLS", "BOYS", "HERO", "stomp to my beat", and "MAKE IT BETTER (So-REAL Mix)") were included in the North American version of Dance Dance Revolution for the PlayStation.

== Music and Soundtrack ==
The original soundtrack for 2ndMix was produced by Toshiba EMI under their Dancemania dance music brand. It featured 32 of the songs in the game. It also came with a second disk that featured a "Nonstop Megamix" with the various songs mixed together in succession. It was released on April 28, 1999. Toshiba EMI re-released the original soundtrack to promote the release of Dance Dance Revolution X3 VS 2ndMIX (in which the game included DDR 2ndMIX) on November 30, 2011.

== Reception ==
Reception

Review scores
Publication	Score
Famitsu	31/40 (PlayStation); 30/40 (Dreamcast)
GameSpot	8.1/10
IGN	8.0/10

On release, Famitsu magazine scored the PlayStation version of the game a 31 out of 40, and the Dreamcast version a 30 out of 40.

== Tournament ==
Between February 11 and February 28, 1999, Konami held qualifiers for the King of Freestyle Dancers tournament in association with Toshiba Emi, Intercord Japan, Japan Airlines, Japan Travel Bureau, Pioneer, Puma and others sponsors in order to build public awareness of Dance Dance Revolution and attract customers to the sponsors' products.

The tournament itself was held on September 26, 1999, in the Zepp Tokyo music hall in Japan. In addition to the competition between the finalists, Konami had a freestyle dance troupe called Konamix perform alongside Captain Jack, whose musical performance also served to announce music for the upcoming Dance Dance Revolution 3rdMix. The winner of the tournament received autographed memorabilia, various products from the tournament sponsors and a trip for two to Okinawa.

Preceded by Dance Dance Revolution	Dance Dance Revolution 2ndMix; 1999	Succeeded by Dance Dance Revolution 3rdMix
