= Drill Instructor (song) =

1996 single by Captain Jack

Single by Captain Jack

from the album The Mission
- Released: 11 March 1996
- Genre: Eurodance
- Length: 4:12
- Label: CDL – Cologne Dance Label; EMI Electrola
- Songwriters: Franky Gee; Liza da Costa; Richard Witte; Udo Niebergall
- Producers: Udo Niebergall; Richard Witte

Captain Jack singles chronology
"Captain Jack" (1995)	"Drill Instructor" (1996)	"Soldier, Soldier" (1996)

Music video
- "Drill Instructor" on YouTube

"Drill Instructor" is a song by the German Eurodance group Captain Jack, consisting of rapper Franky Gee and singer Liza da Costa. It was released in March 1996 as the second single from their debut album, The Mission (1996). Gee and da Costa co-wrote the song with its producers Udo Niebergall and Richard Witte.

Like Captain Jack's debut hit, "Captain Jack", "Drill Instructor" was commercially successful, particularly in the Netherlands, where it topped the Dutch Top 40 and Single Top 100 charts. The song also reached the top 10 in Austria, Belgium, Czech Republic, Finland, Germany and Latvia. On the Eurochart Hot 100, "Drill Instructor" peaked at number 14. The accompanying music video was directed by Mark Glaeser for Neue Sentimental Film and filmed in California.

== Track listings ==
- 12-inch vinyl, Germany (1996)

A1. "Drill Instructor" (All 4 One Club Mix) – 6:43
A2. "Drill Instructor" (In 2 Da Future Club Mix) – 5:34
B1. "Drill Instructor" (4Ever Peace Mix) – 5:40
B2. "Drill Instructor" (Shortmix) – 4:12

- CD single, Benelux (1996)
1. "Drill Instructor (All For One)" (Shortmix) – 4:12
2. "Drill Instructor (All For One)" (4Ever Peace Mix) – 5:40
- CD maxi-single, Europe (1996)
1. "Drill Instructor (All For One)" (Shortmix) – 4:12
2. "Drill Instructor (All For One)" (All For 1 Club Mix) – 6:12
3. "Drill Instructor (All For One)" (4ever Peace Mix) – 5:40
4. "Drill Instructor (All For One)" (In2 Da Future Mix) – 5:34
- CD maxi-single (remix), Europe (1996)
1. "Drill Instructor" (Back On Vinyl Remix) – 5:56
2. "Drill Instructor" (Electronic Voice Remix) – 6:25
3. "Drill Instructor" (Summer Of Love Remix) – 5:31

== Charts ==
=== Weekly charts ===
Chart (1996)	Peak position
Austria (Ö3 Austria Top 40)	6
Belgium (Ultratop 50 Flanders)	2
Czech Republic (IFPI CR)	4
Denmark (IFPI)	14
Estonia (Eesti Top 20)	11
Europe (Eurochart Hot 100)	14
Europe (European Dance Radio)	23
Finland (Suomen virallinen lista)	7
Germany (GfK)	3
Latvia (Latvijas Top 50)	7
Netherlands (Dutch Top 40)	1
Netherlands (Single Top 100)	1
Sweden (Sverigetopplistan)	59
Switzerland (Schweizer Hitparade)	13

=== Year-end charts ===
Chart (1996)	Position
Belgium (Ultratop 50 Flanders)	54
Europe (Eurochart Hot 100)	77
Germany (Media Control)	34
Latvia (Latvijas Top 50)	62
Netherlands (Dutch Top 40)	19
Netherlands (Single Top 100)	19

== Certifications ==
Region	Certification	Certified units/sales
Germany (BVMI)	Gold	250,000^{^}
^{^} Shipments figures based on certification alone.
