= Party Warriors =

Studio album by Captain Jack
- Released: February 24, 2003
- Recorded: 2002
- Genre: Dance, Rock/Pop, R&B
- Length: 52:14

Captain Jack chronology
Top Secret (2001)	Party Warriors (2003)	Cafe Cubar (2003)

Party Warriors is an album by Captain Jack. It was released in 2003.

== Track listing ==
1. "Heyaaah (Intro)" - 1:02
2. "Centerfold (Radio Mix)" - 2:56
3. "Give it Up (Radio Mix)" - 3:26
4. "Iko Iko (140 BPM Trance Remix)" - 3:37
5. "Early in the Morning (We like the Captain)" - 2:51
6. "Stand Up ('til We Get Enough)" - 3:09
7. "Hai Hai Hai (Thanx Japan and Fuyuki)" - 3:32
8. "Party Warriors (Our fight is Glorious)" - 3:28
9. "Don't you Just Know it (Don't Ha Ha)" - 2:41
10. "Hush (Na-Na, Na-Na)" - 3:06
11. "Turn it Up 2002 (The Power Mix)" - 3:16
12. "Go West (Fast Mellow Mix)" - 3:33
13. "Take Me Out To The BallGame (Captain's Drill Remix)" - 3:13
14. "Dancing Pompokolin (Captain's Eurasia Mix)" - 3:40
15. "Centerfold (130 BPM Move it Remix)" - 3:24
16. "Centerfold (Trance Remix Clubversion) feat. DJ Perplexter" - 6:45
17. "Ahuga (Outro)" - 1:15
