= Captain Jack (group) =

German Eurodance group

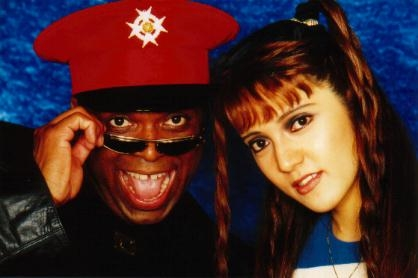
- Franky Gee and Maloy, c. 1999–2000

Background information
- Origin: Darmstadt, Germany
- Genres: Eurodance, dance-pop, dance-rock
- Years active: 1995–2005, 2008–present
- Members: Bruce Lacy; Illi Love (Ilka Anna Antonia Traue)
- Past members: Sharky Durban (1995); Franky Gee (1995–2005) (deceased); Liza da Costa (1995–1999); Maloy Lozanes (1999–2001); Sabrina (Sabine Repas) (2005); Jamie Lee (Nadja Biereth) (2008–2009); Laura Martin (2010–2012); Michelle Stanley (2012-2020)
- Website: http://www.captain-jack.com

Captain Jack is an American-German Eurodance and dance-rock project formed in Darmstadt in 1995. The project is best known for its single "Captain Jack", which reached the top 10 in many countries in Europe.

== History and career ==
=== 1995: Career beginnings ===
The original group consisted of Sharky Durban and Liza da Costa. They recorded the songs "Dam, Dam, Dam" and "Captain Jack". The latter is the only song featured on the band's debut album The Mission.

=== 1995–1998: Second lineup, The Mission and Operation Dance ===
Sharky left the group and was replaced by Francisco Gutierrez alias Franky Gee.

Gutierrez and Liza da Costa released the albums The Mission and Operation Dance and the singles "Drill Instructor" and "Holiday" before Liza da Costa left in December 1998, forming a jazz band called Hotel Bossa Nova in 2005.

=== 1999–2000: Third lineup and The Captain's Revenge ===
Liza da Costa was replaced by the singer Maria Lucia Lozanes who went by the stage name Maloy. In this formation they released one album, called The Captain's Revenge, and the three singles: "Dream a Dream", "Get Up" with the Gipsy Kings, and "Only You" before Maloy left in November 2000.

=== 2001–2005: Fourth and fifth lineups, Franky Gee's death and hiatus ===
Maloy was replaced by Ilka Anna Antonia Traue, alias Illi Love, who stayed until 2005. In this formation they released the five albums Top Secret, Party Warriors, Cafe Cubar, Music Instructor and their first "Greatest Hits" totaling eleven single up to the release of "Capitano", which by this point Illi Love was replaced by Sabine Repas. Soon after, Franky suffered a cerebral hemorrhage while walking with his son in Spain on 17 October 2005. Doctors predicted that the damage was fatal, and Franky Gee died at the age of 43 on Saturday 22 October 2005, after spending five days in a coma. The producers paused the project.

=== 2008–2009: Reunion, new lineup, and Captain Jack is Back ===
The Captain Jack name was revived in summer of 2008 with Bruce Lacy and singer Jamie Lee. The new lineup's first single, "Turkish Bazar", released on 18 September 2008, was of the dance-pop and hip hop genres, dropping the original lineup's eurodance roots. It was followed by the album "Captain Jack is Back", released on 17 October 2008, and two more singles "Push It Up" and "We Will Rock You" before Captain Jack and Jamie Lee parted ways.

=== 2010–present: Seventh lineup, Back to the Dancefloor, and Illi Love's return ===
In 2010 Laura Martin, participant of the fourth installment of Deutschland sucht den Superstar, the German version of Pop Idol, and the first season of The Voice of Germany, joined Bruce Lacy and replaced Jamie Lee. They released the album Back to the Dancefloor in April 2011, which featured Captain Jack classics in new DJ remixes with new songs. The album was followed by three singles "Crank It Up/Deutschland schieß ein Tor", "People Like to Party" and "How Does It Feel". In the end of 2012 Laura left the band to focus in her solo career. Michelle Stanley replaced her, and toured with Bruce Lacy until 2020.

Throughout 2020 and 2021, Bruce Lacy continued to appear as a featured artist on a number of tracks, credited as Captain Jack. In 2021, he released "Summersun", a collaboration with former Mr. President member LayZee and Illi Love, one of the vocalists from Franky Gee's era.

== Musical style ==
Captain Jack's music was stylized as a form of military training mixed with Europop, dance-rock and dance pop music. They were musically influenced by the eurodance genre that was popular in Europe, Oceania, and South America in the 1990s. The style of eurodance was dance music with a female singer and a male rapper to follow a traditional verse-chorus structure. Captain Jack are best known for dance tracks like "Captain Jack", "Drill Instructor" or "Little Boy", although they also made slower tracks such as "Back Home", "7 Days" and "I Feel" that strayed from the europop genre. There are also some Ace of Base influenced reggae pop songs like "Soldier, Soldier" on their early albums. Captain Jack covered numerous songs such as A-ha's "Take On Me", Queen's "Another One Bites the Dust" or Madonna's "Holiday". They also sampled classical elements like Edvard Grieg's "In the Hall of the Mountain King" in their dance song "Dream a Dream" or Johann Pachabel's "Canon in D major" in their ballad "Children". During the early 2000s Captain Jack changed their musical style from eurodance pop to summer vibe tunes, following the styles of the previous single releases "Soldier, Soldier" and "Holiday". They covered numerous well-known famous summer songs, such as Chico Buarque's "A Banda" (in their version, "Get Up"), Captain Sensible's "Say Captain, Say Wot", Huey Smith & His Clowns's "Don't You Just Know It (Don't Ha Ha)" or KC and the Sunshine Band's "Give It Up". They continued that style til the band's hiatus in 2005. In 2008 Captain Jack returned with the song "Turkish Bazar".

== Other endeavours ==
Fans of the Konami arcade game Dance Dance Revolution know them from the numerous songs that, through the Dancemania series of albums, have been used in the game series. The group's music was also featured in other Konami music games such as beatmania and Dance Maniax.

Their songs "Children" and "Children Need a Helping Hand", collaborations with Hand in Children e.V., a supergroup charity collective, were released in 1996 and 1997.

== Members ==
Year	Male vocals	Female vocals
1995	Sharky Durban	Liza da Costa
1995–1998	Franky Gee (Francisco Alejandro Gutierrez)	Liza da Costa
1999–2001	Franky Gee (Francisco Alejandro Gutierrez)	Maloy Lozanes (Maria Lucia Lozanes)
2001–2005	Franky Gee (Francisco Alejandro Gutierrez)	Illi Love (Ilka Anna Antonia Traue)
2005	Franky Gee (Francisco Alejandro Gutierrez)	Sabrina (Sabine Repas)
2008–2009	Bruce Lacy	Jamie Lee (Nadja Biereth)
2010–2012	Bruce Lacy	Laura Martin
2012-2020	Bruce Lacy	Michelle Stanley
2021-	Bruce Lacy	Illi Love (Ilka Anna Antonia Traue)

== Discography ==
=== Studio albums ===
Title	Album details	Peak chart positions							Certifications
Title	Album details	GER	AUT	BEL (FLA)	FIN	NED	NOR	SWI	Certifications
The Mission	Released: 25 March 1996; Label: EMI Electrola; Formats: Cassette, CD,	11	27	48	3	2	8	22	GER: Gold; FIN: Platinum; POL: Platinum
Operation Dance	Released: 26 March 1997; Label: EMI Electrola; Formats: Cassette, CD,	47	37	—	10	21	21	—	FIN: Gold
The Captain's Revenge	Released: 19 July 1999; Label: Marlboro; Formats: Cassette, CD,	—	—	—	—	—	—	—	
Top Secret	Released: 8 October 2001; Label: E-Park; Formats: Cassette, CD,	—	—	—	—	—	—	—	
Party Warriors	Released: 24 February 2003; Label: Akropolis; Formats: Cassette, CD,	—	—	—	—	—	—	—	
Cafe Cubar	Released: 1 September 2003; Label: Da Records (DA Music); Formats: Cassette, CD,	—	—	—	—	—	—	—	
Music Instructor	Released: 1 November 2004; Label: Da Records (DA Music); Formats: Cassette, CD,	—	—	—	—	—	—	—	
Captain Jack Is Back	Released: 21 November 2008; Label: A45; Formats: Cassette, CD,	—	—	—	—	—	—	—	
Back to the Dancefloor	Released: 22 April 2011; Label: Amber Music; Formats: CD,	—	—	—	—	—	—	—	
"—" denotes items which were not released in that country or failed to chart.

=== Singles ===
Title	Year	Peak chart positions								Certifications	Album
Title	Year	GER	AUT	BEL (FLA)	FIN	NED	NOR	SWE	SWI	Certifications	Album
"Dam, Dam, Dam"	1995	—	—	—	—	—	—	—	—		Non-album single
"Captain Jack"	1995	3	6	2	—	1	5	50	6	GER: Platinum	The Mission
"Drill Instructor"	1996	4	6	2	7	1	—	59	13	GER:Gold	The Mission
"Soldier, Soldier"	1996	11	13	21	6	4	—	—	12		The Mission
"Little Boy"	1996	27	31	46	16	8	—	—	50		The Mission
"Another One Bites the Dust"	1996	61	33	41	5	12	—	—	—		Queen Dance Traxx
"Together and Forever"	1997	56	30	48	9	20	—	—	—		Operation Dance
"Holiday"	1997	87	—	—	—	—	—	—	—		Operation Dance
"Secret Agent"	1997	—	—	—	—	—	—	—	—		Operation Dance
"Get Up" (with Gipsy Kings)	1999	23	27	—	—	—	—	—	—		The Captain's Revenge
"Dream a Dream"	1999	100	—	—	—	—	—	—	—		The Captain's Revenge
"Only You"	1999	—	—	—	—	—	—	—	—		The Captain's Revenge
"Iko Iko"	2001	22	16	—	—	—	—	—	62		Top Secret
"Say Captain, Say Wot"	2001	—	—	—	—	—	—	—	—		Top Secret
"Don't You Just Know It (Don't Ha Ha)" (with DJ Ötzi)	2001	59	15	—	—	—	—	—	—		Top Secret
"Give It Up"	2002	61	—	—	—	—	—	—	—		Party Warriors
"Centerfold"	2003	—	—	—	—	—	—	—	—		Party Warriors
"Viva La Vida"	2003	80	—	—	—	—	—	—	—		Cafe Cubar
"Volare"	2003	—	—	—	—	—	—	—	—		Cafe Cubar
"Miss Ibiza"	2004	—	—	—	—	—	—	—	—		Cafe Cubar
"Samba Brazil"	2004	—	—	—	—	—	—	—	—		Music Instructor
"Hands Up"	2004	—	—	—	—	—	—	—	—		Music Instructor
"Ein bisschen Spaß muss sein (We Wanna Have Some Fun) (New Version)" (with Roberto Blanco)	2004	—	—	—	—	—	—	—	—		Greatest Hits
"Capitano"	2005	—	—	—	—	—	—	—	—		Greatest Hits
"Turkish Bazar"	2008	—	—	—	—	—	—	—	—		Captain Jack is Back
"Push It Up"	2008	—	—	—	—	—	—	—	—		Captain Jack is Back
"We Will Rock You"	2008	—	—	—	—	—	—	—	—		Captain Jack is Back
"Crank It Up/Deutschland schieß ein Tor"	2010	—	—	—	—	—	—	—	—		Back to the Dancefloor
"People Like to Party"	2010	—	—	—	—	—	—	—	—		Back to the Dancefloor
"How Does It Feel"	2010	—	—	—	—	—	—	—	—		Back to the Dancefloor
"In the Army Now 2017"	2017	—	—	—	—	—	—	—	—		Non-album singles
"Loco Loco"	2021	—	—	—	—	—	—	—	—		Non-album singles
"—" denotes items which were not released in that country or failed to chart.

=== Video games ===
Captain Jack has a total of 12 songs which appear in the Dance Dance Revolution arcade series. The band's premiere appearance was in the home release of Dance Dance Revolution 2ndMix, with three songs that were also featured in the arcade release of Dance Dance Revolution 3rdMix. This included the Grandale Remix of the band's signature song, "Captain Jack", which appeared in a total of eight arcade releases.

Additionally, two Captain Jack songs are available in the StepManiaX arcade game. "Dream a Dream ~Cheeky Trax UK Remix~" is available on all versions, while "My Generation (Fat Beat Mix)" requires a free online update released on 20 December 2020.

Captain Jack arcade appearances (1999–2009)
Song	Arcade game								
Song	2000	3rd	4th	5th	MAX2	Ex	SN	SN2	X
"Drill Instructor (C-Jah Happy Mix)"	Yes								
"Dream A Dream (Miami Booty Mix)"	Yes								
"Together & Forever"	Yes								
"Captain Jack (Grandale Remix)"		Yes	Yes	Yes		Yes			
"In The Navy '99 (XXL Disaster Remix)"		Yes	Yes						
"The Race"		Yes	Yes						
"Dream A Dream"			Yes	Yes					
"Only You"			Yes	Yes					
"My Generation (Fat Beat Mix)"				Yes					
"おどるポンポコリン"				Yes					
"Little Boy (Boy Oh Boy Mix)"					Yes	Yes			
"Centerfold (130BPM move it remix)"							Yes	Yes	Yes

Captain Jack arcade appearances (2010–present)
Song	Arcade game				
Song	X2	X3	2013	2014	SMX
Captain Jack	Yes	Yes	Yes	Removed on 3 July 2015	
"Dream a Dream ~Cheeky Trax UK Remix~"					Yes
"My Generation (Fat Beat Mix)"					Yes
