= Together and Forever =

Single by Captain Jack

from the album Operation Dance
- B-side: "Remix"
- Released: 3 March 1997
- Studio: Beatdisaster Studios
- Genre: Eurodance
- Length: 3:27
- Label: CDL - Cologne Dance Label
- Songwriters: Liza da Costa; Udo Niebergall; Richard Witte
- Producers: Udo Niebergall; Richard Witte

Captain Jack singles chronology
"Another One Bites the Dust" (1996)	"Together and Forever" (1997)	"Holiday" (1997)

"Together and Forever" is a song recorded by German Eurodance group Captain Jack and released in March 1997, by Cologne Dance Label, as the lead single from their second album, Operation Dance (1997). The song is co-written by group member Liza da Costa with its producers Udo Niebergall and Richard Witte. It was a top-10 hit in Finland, peaking at number nine. The song was also a top-20 hit in the Netherlands and a top-30 hit in Austria. The accompanying music video was directed by Mark Glaeser. It was produced by Neue Sentimental Film and filmed in Las Vegas in Nevada, the US.

== Track listings ==
- CD single, Germany (1997)
1. "Together and Forever" (Radio-Mix One) — 3:27
2. "Together and Forever" (Radio-Mix Two) — 3:50
- CD maxi-single, Europe (1997)
1. "Together and Forever" (Radio-Mix One) — 3:27
2. "Together and Forever" (Captains Club-Mix) — 6:00
3. "Together and Forever" (Captains Maxi-Mix) — 4:45
4. "Together and Forever" (Captains Short-Mix) — 3:55

== Charts ==
Chart (1997)	Peak position
Austria (Ö3 Austria Top 40)	30
Belgium (Ultratop 50 Flanders)	48
Europe (Eurochart Hot 100)	99
Finland (Suomen virallinen lista)	9
Germany (Media Control Charts)	56
Netherlands (Dutch Top 40)	20
Netherlands (Single Top 100)	30
