= Captain Jack (Captain Jack song) =

1995 single by Captain Jack

Single by Captain Jack

from the album The Mission
- Released: 27 July 1995
- Genre: Techno
- Length: 4:06
- Label: CDL – Cologne Dance Label
- Songwriters: Liza da Costa; Udo Niebergall; Volker Weber; Richard Witte
- Producers: Udo Niebergall; Eric Schnecko

Captain Jack singles chronology
"Captain Jack" (1995)	"Drill Instructor" (1996)

Music video
- "Captain Jack" on YouTube

"Captain Jack" is a song by the German Eurodance group Captain Jack, consisting of producer and vocalist Franky Gee, actor Sharky Durban and singer Liza da Costa. It was released in July 1995 as the lead single from their debut album, The Mission (1996). The song was produced by Udo Niebergall and Eric Schnecko, and is based on an old US Army military cadence known as "Hey, Hey Captain Jack".

"Captain Jack" was successful in Europe, particularly in Hungary, Latvia and the Netherlands, where it topped the charts. It was certified platinum in Germany and gold in the Netherlands and Norway. The accompanying music video was directed by Mark Glaeser. "Captain Jack" was nominated to the 1997 Echo Awards for the most successful national dance single.

== Critical reception ==
Alan Jones from Music Week wrote, "Captain Jack is a ludicrous creation, already fearsomely popular on the continent. The first Captain Jack single to escape into the UK is a self-titled effort combining a banging techno backing track with some deep-throated singing/rapping. The good captain reels off dance instructions in a frenetic manner which recalls 'sounding off' in the style of the US military drill. A bit of a novelty, but one that shouldn't be underestimated."

== Chart performance ==
"Captain Jack" peaked at number one in Hungary and the Netherlands. It entered the top 10 in Austria, Denmark, Estonia, Flanders, Germany, Norway and Switzerland. Additionally, it was a top-20 hit in Ireland, as well as on the Eurochart Hot 100, where it peaked at number 14 in February 1996. In the UK, it reached number 104 on the UK Singles Chart. "Captain Jack" earned a gold record in the Netherlands and Norway, with a sale of 40,000 and 15,000 singles. In Germany, it was awarded with a platinum record, when 500,000 units were sold there.

== Music video ==
The music video for "Captain Jack" was directed by Mark Glaeser for Neue Sentimental Film and filmed in Frankfurt, Germany. It was A-listed on German music television channel VIVA in January 1996.

== Track listings ==
European CD single

- "Captain Jack" (short mix) – 4:06
- "Captain Jack" (Peacecamp mix) – 5:23

European CD maxi

- "Captain Jack" (short mix) – 4:06
- "Captain Jack" (Peacecamp mix) – 5:23
- "Captain Jack" (House mix) – 5:04
- "Captain Jack" (club mix) – 5:19
- "Captain Jack" (Analog mix) – 3:15

European CD maxi (Remixes)

- "Captain Jack" (Dancefloor Syndroma Success mix) – 6:05
- "Captain Jack" (Dancefloor Syndroma radio remix) – 3:29
- "Captain Jack" (Dancefloor Syndroma House mix) – 6:36
- "Captain Jack" (Captain Jack Is in da House mix) – 4:28

== Charts ==
=== Weekly charts ===
Chart (1995–1996)	Peak position
Austria (Ö3 Austria Top 40)	6
Belgium (Ultratop 50 Flanders)	2
Denmark (IFPI)	5
Estonia (Eesti Top 20)	4
Europe (Eurochart Hot 100)	14
Germany (GfK)	3
Hungary (Mahasz)	1
Ireland (IRMA)	14
Latvia (Latvijas Top 50)	1
Netherlands (Dutch Top 40)	1
Netherlands (Single Top 100)	1
Norway (VG-lista)	5
Quebec (ADISQ)	40
Sweden (Sverigetopplistan)	50
Switzerland (Schweizer Hitparade)	6
UK Singles (OCC)	104

=== Year-end charts ===
Chart (1996)	Position
Belgium (Ultratop 50 Flanders)	20
Europe (Eurochart Hot 100)	40
Germany (Media Control)	17
Latvia (Latvijas Top 50)	14
Netherlands (Dutch Top 40)	3
Netherlands (Single Top 100)	6
Switzerland (Schweizer Hitparade)	40

=== Decade-end charts ===
Chart (1990–1999)	Rank
Netherlands (Dutch Top 40)	38

== Certifications ==
Region	Certification	Certified units/sales
Germany (BVMI)	Platinum	500,000^{^}
Netherlands (NVPI)	Gold	50,000^{^}
Norway (IFPI Norway)	Gold	
^{^} Shipments figures based on certification alone.

== Release history ==
Region	Date	Format(s)	Label(s)	Ref.
Europe	27 July 1995	CD	CDL – Cologne Dance Label	
Japan	3 July 1996	CD	EMI; CDL – Cologne Dance Label; Intercord Japan	
United Kingdom	12 August 1996	12-inch vinyl; CD	EMI; Encore	
