= Franky Gee =

Cuban-born American musician (1962–2005)

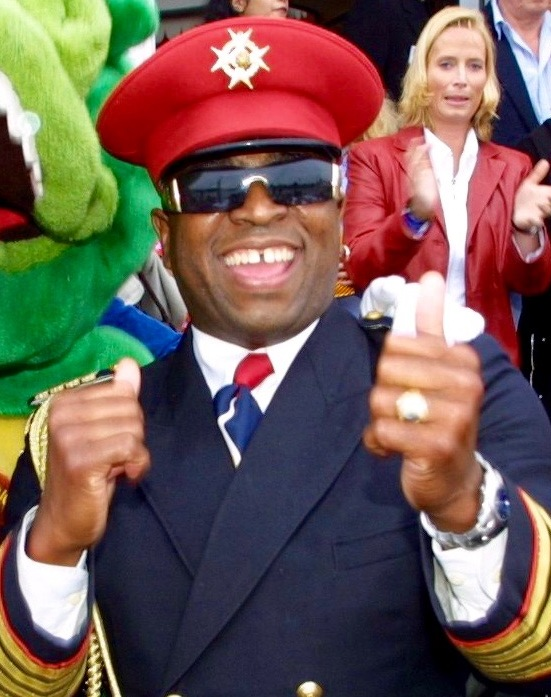
- Gee in June 2002

Background information
- Born: Francisco Alejandro Gutierrez; February 19, 1962; Havana, Cuba
- Origin: Miami, Florida, U.S.
- Died: October 22, 2005 (aged 43) Palma de Mallorca, Spain
- Genres: Europop, dance-rock, Eurodance
- Occupations: Singer, Rapper, Music Producer, DJ, Soldier
- Instruments: Vocals, turntables
- Years active: 1987–2005

Francisco Alejandro Gutierrez (February 19, 1962 – October 22, 2005), known professionally as Franky Gee, was a Cuban-American singer, disc jockey, rapper and soldier. He was the second lead vocalist of the Europop group Captain Jack.

== Early life ==
Gee was born in Havana, Cuba, with 3 siblings. His family first moved to Miami, Florida, and then emigrated across the pond to Mallorca, Spain when he was young. After college, he enlisted in the United States Army, and was stationed in Germany. While there, he began his career as a disc jockey. He grew tired of military service and decided to stay in Germany when his enlistment expired. In Darmstadt, Germany, he formed Captain Jack, alongside vocalist Liza da Costa, where he found success.

Gee also wrestled for Frontier Martial-Arts Wrestling in Japan on August 28, 2000, losing to Kodo Fuyuki at FMW's Super Dynamism 2000 pay-per-view.

== Death ==
On October 17, 2005, he suffered a cerebral hemorrhage while walking with his son in Palma de Mallorca. He went into a coma and died five days later. The cerebral hemorrhage may have been due to a stroke in July 2002.
