= List of Pump It Up songs =

This is a list of songs that are featured in Andamiro's Pump It Up video game series.

Pump It Up's in-house musician group BanYa was responsible for original songs in the series under dance pop, rock, heavy metal, jazz, folk, progressive and house genres, including EDM remixes of classical pieces such as Canon in D, Turkey March and Moonlight. In Fiesta, MAX, Doin and SHK (originally from O2Jam) joined as new in-house musicians. Since 1st Dance Floor, there are a large number of licensed K-pop songs. Starting with Pump It Up Premiere and onward, international songs are included mostly from North America, Latin America, Mexico, Brazil, China, and elsewhere. In almost all versions, BanYa was also responsible for nonstop remixes that mix numerous K-pop and world music songs, especially original songs (examples are J Knows that Old Bong, World Remix, Turkey Virus, K-pop Dance, Chicago Club Mix, etc.), but they are available in Remix Station (Special Zone in NX) or WorldMax in NX2 and NXA (Quest World in Fiesta). Starting with Exceed 2, full songs are added only in separate stations.

== Songlist ==
=== 1st Dance Floor (1999) ===
Song title (English/Korean)	Artist	Latest appearance	Notes
Ignition Starts 이그니션 스타츠	BanYa	Pump It Up Prime 2	Ignition Starts is the first PIU Original song, as well as the very first song in Pump It Up series, and is one of the handful of PIU original songs that were not revived in Pump It Up Fiesta until its revival in Pump It Up Prime ver. 1.01.0. It was removed again in Pump It Up XX. Ignition Starts is a remix of "Ride On The Rhythm" originally composed by Nigel Broad. It also features NASA's command center announcement and countdown sequence during Apollo 11 moon landing mission. Alongside Hypnosis, Ignition Starts held the record for the longest disappearance until their revival at 10 years since their removal in Pump It Up Zero (except appearance in Pump It Up Pro) until it was beaten by An Interesting View (17 years). Ignition Starts is never revived after its removal in Pump It Up XX due to its plagiarism of Nigel Broad's "Ride On The Rhythm" by De Wolfe Music.
Hypnosis 힙노시스	BanYa	Pump It Up Prime 2	Hypnosis is one of the handful of PIU original songs that were not revived in Pump It Up Fiesta until its revival in Pump It Up Prime ver. 1.01.0. It was removed again in Pump It Up XX. Alongside Ignition Starts, Hypnosis held the record for the longest disappearance until their revival at 10 years since their removal in Pump It Up Zero (except appearance in Pump It Up Pro) until it was beaten by An Interesting View (17 years). Like Ignition Starts, Hypnosis is also never revived after its in Pump It Up XX due to its plagiarism of Colin Kiddy's "Buzz" by De Wolfe Music.
Forever Love 영원한 사랑	Fin.K.L	Pump it Up NXA	Forever Love is the first K-Pop licensed song in the series.
Passion 열정	Yoo Seung Jun	Pump It Up Exceed 2	
Black Cat 검은 고양이	Turbo	Pump It Up Premiere 2	Black Cat (1st) is the cover version of the Italian children's song "Volevo un gatto nero".
Pom Pom Pom 폼생폼사	Sechskies	Pump It Up Premiere 2	
The Rap: Act 2 랩교 2막	Honey Family	Pump It Up Premiere 2	
Come To Me 돌아와	Clon	Pump It Up Pro	
Funky Tonight 펑키 투나잇	Clon	Pump It Up Prime 2	Funky Tonight holds the second-highest availability of any non-PIU Original song in Pump It Up series up to twenty-three games until it was removed in Pump It Up XX.
What Do U Really Want? 니가 진짜로 원하는게 뭐야?	Monochrome	Pump It Up Premiere 2	What Do You Really Want? is the remix of the song with the same name by Shin Hae Chul.
Hatred 증오	Novasonic	Pump It Up Fiesta 2	Hatred is known as "Hate!"
Another Truth 또다른 진심	Novasonic	Present	Another Truth holds the highest availability of any song in Pump It Up series up to present (twenty-five games). Another Truth is the remaining Pump It Up 1st Dance Floor song as of Pump It Up Phoenix.
I Want U 난 널 원해	Drunken Tiger	Pump It Up PREX 2	
I Don't Know Anything 몰라	Uhm Jung Hwa	Pump It Up Premiere 2	I Don't Know Anything shares a similar rap sample with "think ya better D" by sAmi from DanceDanceRevolution 2ndReMIX.
No Particular Reason 이유같지 않은 이유	Park Mee Kyung	Pump It Up Premiere 2	
Mix 1-1 1st 디바 리믹스	Fin.K.L/Cleo/Park Mee Kyung	Pump It Up Perfect Collection	Known as "1st Diva Remix" Mixes Pride, Only When You Love Me and Someday. 1st Diva Remix is the first K-pop remix in the series without a separate song in the default play.
Mix 1–2 1st 디스코 리믹스	Park Mee Kyung/Jo Sung Mo/Uhm Jung Hwa	Pump It Up Perfect Collection	Known as "1st Disco Remix". Mixes Festival, You & I and Attachment
Mix 1–3 1st 테크노 리믹스	Kim Gun Mo/Clon/Sechskies	Pump It Up Perfect Collection	Known as "1st Techno Remix". Mixes A Bird Flown Away Over a Cuckoo Nest, Kung Ddari Sha Bah Rah and Road Fighter
Mix 1–4 터보 리믹스	Turbo	Pump It Up NX2	Known as "Turbo Remix". Mixes Choice, Only Seventeen, My Childhood Dream and Goodbye Yesterday
Battle 1 Hip-Hop	BanYa	Exclusive	Battle Mode only in 1st Dance Floor
Battle 2 Disco	BanYa	Exclusive	Battle Mode only in 1st Dance Floor
Battle 3 Techno	BanYa	Exclusive	Battle Mode only in 1st Dance Floor
Battle 4 Hardcore	BanYa	Exclusive	Battle Mode only in 1st Dance Floor
Silhouette 실루엣	Kim Hyun-jung	None	Cancelled song

=== 2nd Dance Floor (December 1999) ===
Song title (English/Korean)	Artist	Latest appearance	Notes
Creamy Skinny 크리미 스키니	BanYa	Pump It Up Premiere 2	Creamy Skinny is never revived after its removal in Pump It Up PREX 2 due to its plagiarism from Colin Kiddy's "Rapport" by De Wolfe Music.
Hate 싫어 (No)	BanYa	Pump It Up NXA World Max	Hate is one of the handful of PIU original songs that were not revived in Pump It Up NX until its revival in Pump It Up NXA (World Max). It was removed again in Pump It Up Fiesta. Hate is never revived after its removal in Pump It Up Fiesta due to its plagiarism of "Birthday Cake" by Cibo Matto.
Koul 코울	BanYa	Pump It Up Exceed 2	Koul is never revived after its removal in Pump It Up Zero due to its plagiarism from "Slam It" and "Def Jam" by Network Music Ensemble.
Final Audition 파이널 오디션	BanYa	Present	
Extravaganza 엑스트라바간자	BanYa	Present	
Rewind 리와인드	Lee Kang Shin	Pump It Up Premiere 2	
I-Yah! 아이야	H.O.T	Pump It Up PREX 2	I-Yah!'s beastly voice sample is taken from Another Truth from Pump It Up 1st Dance Floor. Apparently that sample was actually used by H.O.T. on their songs Fighting Spirits and "Techno Love".
Fighting Spirits 투지	H.O.T	Pump It Up NX ver. 1.05	Fighting Spirits's original title is "Git It Up (투지)".
Love 러브	S.E.S	Pump It Up PREX	
Please 꼭	Kim Gun Mo	Pump It Up PREX	
Com'back 컴 백	Sechskies	Pump It Up Prime 2	
Mobius Strip 뫼비우스의 띠	Sechskies	Pump It Up Prime 2	
Fever 피버	Cho PD	Pump It Up PREX 2	
Curiosity 호기심	Hans Band	Pump It Up Premiere 2	Curiosity is a cover of "We Like to Party! (Vengabus)" by Vengaboys.
Love 잊혀진 사랑	Click-B	Pump It Up Premiere 2	Love (Click-B) is the first of many songs that has another song with the same name, followed by Tell Me, First Love, Loner, Go Away, Come To Me, What Do You Really Want, U, Fire, Online, Further, Step, I Want U, Storm, and Pandora.
Tell Me, Tell Me 텔미 텔미	S#arp	Pump It Up PREX	
Heart Break 상처	Jo Sung Mo	Pump It Up PREX	
Mix 2–1 조성모 리믹스	Jo Sung Mo	Pump It Up Perfect Collection	Known as "Jo Sung Mo Remix" Mixes You & I, Heart Break, and Final Audition Jo Sung Mo Remix is the first remix with an available song from the default play (Heart Break) and with a song uncredited to an artist in the remix (Final Audition by BanYa).
Mix 2-2 엄정화 리믹스	Uhm Jung Hwa	Pump It Up Perfect Collection	Known as "Uhm Jung Hwa Remix" Mixes Festival, Scarlet and I Don't Know Anything
Mix 2–3 드렁큰 패밀리 리믹스	Drunken Tiger & Honey Family	Pump It Up NX2	Known as "Drunken Family Remix" Mixes The Rap: Act 1 and I Want U (Drunken Tiger)
Mix 2–4 SM 타운 리믹스	H.O.T & S.E.S	Pump It Up Perfect Collection	Known as "SM Town Remix" Mixes I-Yah!, Fighting Spirits and Love (S.E.S) SM Town Remix is named after its own collective formed under SM Entertainment.
Mix 2–5 리피토먼트 리믹스	BanYa	Present	Known as "Techno Repeatorment" or "Repeatorment Remix" Techno Repeatorment is the first PIU Original remix in the series without its normal song cut in default play until Love is a Danger Zone (Try to B.P.M) in Pump It Up Zero.
Mix 2–7 2nd 히든 리믹스	Clon & Sechskies	Pump It Up NX2	Known as "2nd Hidden Remix" Mixes Come To Me, Funky Tonight, and Road Fighter

=== 3rd Dance Floor O.B.G (2000) ===
Song title (English/Korean)	Artist	Latest appearance	Notes
Final Audition 2 파이널 오디션 2	BanYa	Present	Final Audition 2 is the remix of Final Audition from 2nd Dance Floor.
Naissance 태동	BanYa	Present	
Turkey March 터키 행진곡	BanYa	Present	Turkey March is the rock remix of "Rondo alla Turca" by Wolfgang Amadeus Mozart and the first classical remix in the series.
With My Lover 님과 함께 (To Be With You)	BanYa	Present	With My Lover is the cover version of "님과 함께" by Nam Jin. With My Lover and Pumping Up were recorded by Lee Yun-jeong, a former vocalist of the Pippi Band who participated as a vocalist in both songs.
An Interesting View 서울구경	BanYa	Present	An Interesting View is the cover version of "서울구경" by Seo Yeong Chun. An Interesting View includes a sample from the 1954 film Godzilla. An Interesting View currently holds the record for longest disappearance since its removal in Pump It Up PREX 2 at 17 years apart, not counting its World Max exclusivity in Pump It Up NXA.
Nightmare 악몽	BanYa	Present	
Close Your Eyes 눈을 감아	BanYa	Present	
Free Style 프리 스타일	BanYa	Present	
Midnight Blue 미드나잇 블루	BanYa	Present	Midnight Blue is the remix of "Pathétique" 2nd Movement by Ludwig van Beethoven.
She Likes Pizza 그녀는 피자를 좋아해	BanYa	Present	
Pumping Up 펌핑 업	BanYa	Present	Pumping Up and With My Lover were recorded by Lee Yun-jeong, a former vocalist of the Pippi Band who participated as a vocalist in both songs.
Don't Bother Me 경고	Tashannie	Pump It Up Prime 2	Don't Bother Me is known as "Caution"
Love Song 연가	Yoo Seung Jun	Pump It Up NX	
Lover's Grief 애수	G.O.D	Pump It Up PREX	
To the Top 투 더 탑	6 Mill. Bionic Juno	Pump It Up Exceed 2	
Separation With Her 그녀와의 이별	Kim Hyun Jung	Pump It Up Premiere 2	
Puyo Puyo 뿌요뿌요	U.P	Pump It Up Premiere 2	
We Are 우리는	Deux	Pump It Up Prime	
Time To Say Goodbye 헤어지는 기회	So Chan Hwui	Pump It Up Premiere 2	
Tell Me 말해줘	Jinusean	Pump It Up Premiere 3	Tell Me (Jinusean) marks the first K-pop song under now-acclaimed YG Entertainment label.
OK? OK! 미녀와 야수	DJ DOC	Pump It Up Premiere 2	OK? OK! Known as "Beauty and the Beast"
Mix 3–1 3rd O.B.G. 디바 리믹스	Fin.K.L/S#arp/Hans Band	Pump It Up Perfect Collection	Known as "3rd O.B.G. Diva Remix" Mixes Forever Love, Tell Me Tell Me and Curiosity
Mix 3–2 박미경 리믹스	Park Mee Kyung	Pump It Up Perfect Collection	Known as "Park Mee Kyung Remix" Mixes No Particular Reason and Eve Warning
Mix 3-3 반야 힙합 리믹스	BanYa	Present	Known as "BanYa Hip-Hop Remix" Mixes Hate, Free Style and Midnight Blue
Mix 3–4 박진영 리믹스	Park Jin Young	Pump It Up Extra	Known as "Park Jin Young Remix" Mixes She Was Pretty and Kiss Me (Park Jin Young)
Mix 3–5 노바소닉 리믹스	Novasonic	Pump It Up NX2 World Max	Known as "Novasonic Remix" Mixes Another Truth and Hatred
Mix 3–7 반야 하드 믹스	BanYa	Pump It Up Infinity	Known as "BanYa Hard Mix" Mixes Ignition Starts, Hypnosis and Extravaganza

=== 3rd Dance Floor S.E (Season Evolution) (September 2000) ===
Song title (English/Korean)	Artist	Latest appearance	Notes
Oh! Rosa 오! 로사	BanYa	Present	
First Love 첫사랑	BanYa	Present	
Betrayer 사랑가	BanYa	Present	
Solitary 무혼 (武魂)	BanYa	Present	
Mr. Larpus 미스터 라푸스	BanYa	Present	Mr. Larpus is based on "Wipe Out" by The Surfaris.
Sad Salsa 새드 살사	Baek Ji Young	Pump It Up Premiere 2	
Summer of love 썸머 오브 러브	Roo'Ra	Pump It Up Premiere 2	
Kiss 키스	Country Kko Kko	Exclusive	Kiss is one of the songs that are cut in the next game and is the first default song exclusive in a single Pump It Up game.
Man & Woman 해석남녀	Cool	Pump It Up Premiere 2	
First Love 초련	Clon	Pump It Up PREX 2	
A-Trap 올가미	Baby V.O.X	Pump It Up Exceed 2	
Disco Bus 디스코 버스	Kim Hyun Jung	Pump It Up Premiere 2	
Run! 뛰어봐	Novasonic	Pump It Up Fiesta 2	
Run to You 런 투 유	DJ DOC	Pump It Up Prime	Run to You uses samples for Daddy Cool by Boney M. After its removal in Pump It Up Exceed 2, Run to You was revived in Pump It Up Fiesta EX.
Sechskies Remix 젝스키스 리믹스	Sechskies	Pump It Up Extra	Mixes Mobius Strip, Pom Pom Pom and Com'back

=== Perfect Collection (December 2000) ===
Song title (English/Korean)	Artist	Latest appearance	Notes
Pump Jump 펌프 점프	BanYa	Present	
N 엔	BanYa	Present	
Rolling Christmas 롤링 크리스마스	BanYa	Present	Rolling Christmas mixes two popular Christmas songs, "Joy to the World" and "Jingle Bells".
All I Want For X-mas 올 아이 원트 포 크리스마스	BanYa	Present	
Beethoven Virus 베토벤 바이러스	BanYa	Present	Beethoven Virus is a remix of "Pathétique" 3rd Movement by Ludwig van Beethoven. Beethoven Virus was performed and promoted by Diana Boncheva in South Korea and World Pump Festival 2005 wherein Pump It Up Exceed 2 was released in November 2004.
I Will Accept You 성인식	Park Ji Yoon	Pump It Up PREX 2	
Come Back to Me 나를 돌아봐	Deux	Pump It Up NXA	
As I Told U 말하자면	Kim Sung Jae	Pump It Up Exceed 2	As I Told U and its album of the same song name were released in late 1995, when Kim Sung Jae passed away shortly after.
I Know 난 알아요	Taiji Boys	Pump It Up PREX 2	I Know and its album of the same artist name were released in early 1992, marking it the oldest K-Pop license ever added in Pump It Up series.
My Fantasy 환상속의 그대	Taiji Boys	Pump It Up PREX 2	
Unforgettable Memory 우리들만의 추억	Taiji Boys	Pump It Up PREX 2	Unforgettable Memory's chorus part is similar to that of "Puff, the Magic Dragon" by Leonard Lipton and Peter Yarrow.
Hayuga 하여가	Taiji Boys	Pump It Up PREX 2	Hayuga and its album "Seo Taiji and Boys II" were released in mid 1993.
Certain Victory 필승	Taiji Boys	Pump It Up PREX 2	
Ultramania 울트라맨이야	Seo Taiji	Pump It Up PREX 2	Ultramania is the first song by Seo Taiji after the group was disbanded. Coincidentally, Feel the Soul, which was later added to Pump It Up NX2, is on the same album released in 2000.
Bonaccia 보나세야	Nazca	Pump It Up PREX 2	At 76 BPM, Bonaccia has the lowest constant BPM in the series, until MAVE:'s Pandora in Pump It Up Phoenix at 75 BPM.
Slam 슬램	Novasonic	Present	
Space Fantasy 스페이스 판타지	E-paksa	Pump It Up Exceed	

=== Extra (2001) ===
Song title (English/Korean)	Artist	Latest appearance	Notes
Flower of Night 야화	People Crew	Pump It Up PREX 2	
Circus Magic 서커스 매직 유랑단	Crying Nut	Pump It Up NX2	
Move Your Head 머리치워 머리	Tin Tin Five	Pump It Up PREX 2	
Trash Man 나는 쓰레기야	N.EX.T	Pump It Up PREX 2	
Funky Jockey 펑키 자키	B.O.K	Pump It Up PREX 2	
Starian 스타리안	Duke	Pump It Up Prime	
Big Money 빅 머니	X-Teen	Pump It Up PREX 2	
Wayo Wayo 와요 와요	O.P.P.A	Pump It Up PREX 2	
Mistake 자책	U'Two	Pump It Up Prime	Mistake is also known as "Guilty Conscience".
The Rap: Act 3 랩교 3막	Honey Family	Pump It Up Zero	The Rap: Act 3 is the first new song by Honey Family since Pump It Up 1st Dance Floor.
Chicken Wing 치킨 윙	BanYa	Present	
Holiday 홀리데이	F2 Original	Pump It Up PREX 2	Holiday uses some melodies from Hypnosis by BanYa.
Radezky Can Can 라젠스키 캉캉	F2 Original	Present	Radezky Can Can is the remix medley of Jacques Offenbach's "Can Can from Orpheus in the Underworld" and Johann Strauss I's "Radetzky March". Radezky Can Can is the first remix of the classical song by a non-BanYa artist. Radezky Can Can currently holds the record for second longest disappearance since its removal in Pump It Up Zero at 14 years apart, beating Ignition Starts and Hypnosis holding 10 years but is beaten by An Interesting View with 17 years.
Wish You Could Find 찾길 바래	Yoo Seung Jun	Pump It Up PREX 2	
Loner 론너	T.T.Ma	Pump It Up NX	
Monkey Magic 몽키 매직	E-paksa	Pump It Up Exceed	Monkey Magic is the cover version of the same name by Godiego.
Out of the Ring 굴레를 벗어나	Deux	Pump It Up PREX 2	
Blind Faith 블라인드 페이스	O-24	Pump It Up PREX 2	
Lazenca, Save Us 라젠카 세이브 어스	N.EX.T	Pump It Up NXA	Lazenca, Save Us was used as the second opening theme of the 1997 South Korean anime TV series "Lazenca". After its removal in Pump It Up Premiere 3, Lazenca, Save Us was revived in Pump It Up NX.
Ferry Boat 뱃놀이	DJ DOC	Pump It Up PREX 2	
Pierrot 삐에로	Lee Hyun Do	Pump It Up Exceed 2	
Final Audition Episode 1 파이널 오디션 에피소드 1	BanYa	Present	
First Love (Techno Mix) 초련 (Techno Mix)	Clon	Exclusive	First Love (Techno Mix) is a dance remix of First Love (Clon) from Pump It Up 3rd Dance Floor S.E.
Extra Hip-Hop Remix 엑스트라 힙합 리믹스	Honey Family & People Crew	Exclusive	Mixes The Rap: Act 3 and Flower of Night
E-paksa Remix 이박사 리믹스	E-paksa	Exclusive	Mixes Young Man (Cover of "Y.M.C.A." by Village People) and High School Rock'n Roll (Cover of "Tsuppari High School Rock'n Roll" by Yokohama Ginbae)
Extra Disco Remix 엑스트라 디스코 리믹스	O-24 & X-Teen	Exclusive	Mixes Blind Faith and Big Money
Extra Deux Remix 엑스트라 듀스 리믹스	Deux	Exclusive	Mixes Pierrot and Out of the Ring
Extra BanYa Remix 엑스트라 반야 리믹스	BanYa	Present	Known as "F.A Ep.1 + Chicken Wing Remix" Mixes Final Audition Episode 1 and Chicken Wing

=== Premiere (June 2001) ===
Song title	Artist	Latest appearance	Notes
Oops! I Did It Again	(Britney Spears)	Pump It Up PREX	Uncredited cover
Bye Bye Bye	(Nsync)	Pump It Up PREX	Uncredited cover
I Need To Know	(Marc Anthony)	Pump It Up PREX	Uncredited cover (Covered by Latin Dance Masters)
Let's Get Loud	(Jennifer Lopez)	Pump It Up PREX	Uncredited cover
Mambo No. 5	(Lou Bega)	Pump It Up PREX	Uncredited cover (Covered by the Mambo Express)
Take On Me	(A-ha)	Pump It Up PREX	Uncredited cover (Covered by A1)
A Cerca	Skank	Exclusive	Brazilian version only
De Volta ao Planeta	Jota Quest	Exclusive	Brazilian version only
Pensamento	Cidade Negra	Exclusive	Brazilian version only
Popozuda Rock 'n Roll	De Falla	Exclusive	Brazilian version only
Rebola Na Boa	Mr. Jam	Exclusive	Brazilian version only
Sempre Assim	Jota Quest	Exclusive	Brazilian version only
Uma Bomba	Braga Boys	Exclusive	Brazilian version only
Vaqueiro Bom Demais	Limão com Mel	Exclusive	Brazilian version only

=== Rebirth (2002) ===
Song title (English/Korean)	Artist	Latest appearance	Notes
Dr. M 닥터 엠	BanYa	Present	Dr. M is a remix of "Symphony No. 40" by Wolfgang Amadeus Mozart.
Emperor 엠페러	BanYa	Present	
Get Your Groove On 겟 유어 그루브 온	BanYa	Present	
Love is a Danger Zone 러브 이즈 어 댄저 존	BanYa	Present	
Maria 마리아	BanYa	Present	Maria is a remix of "Ave Maria" by Franz Schubert.
Mission Possible 미션 파서블	BanYa	Present	
My Way 마이 웨이	BanYa	Present	
Point Break 포인트 브레이크	BanYa	Present	Point Break is a remix of "Orchestral Suite No. 3 in D major", second piece "Air on the G String" by Johann Sebastian Bach.
Street Show Down 스트리트 쇼 다운	BanYa	Present	
Top City 탑 시티	BanYa	Present	
Winter 윈터	BanYa	Present	Winter is a remix of "Winter" from "The Four Seasons" by Antonio Vivaldi.
Will o' the Wisp 윌 오 더 위스프	BanYa	Present	
Till the End of Time 틸 디 엔드 오브 타임	BanYa	Present	
Oy Oy Oy 오이 오이 오이	BanYa	Present	
We Will Meet Again 위 윌 밋 어게인	BanYa	Present	
Miss's Story 미스 에스 스토리	BanYa	Present	Miss's Story is a remix of "Symphony No. 5" by Ludwig van Beethoven.
Set Me Up 셋 미 업	BanYa	Present	
Dance With Me 댄스 위드 미	BanYa	Present	
Go Away! 가	To-Ya	Pump It Up Exceed 2	
I Love You 사랑해	Jewelry	Pump It Up Premiere 3	
Gotta be Kidding 웃기네	Hanul	Pump It Up Exceed 2	Gotta be Kidding is a cover version of "Venus" by Shocking Blue.
Zzanga 짱가	Kim Gun Mo	Pump It Up PREX 2	Zzanga is the first new song by Kim Gun Mo since Pump It Up 2nd Dance Floor.
A Prison Without Bars 창살 없는 감옥	Park Jin Young	Pump It Up PREX 2	
A Whistle 휘파람	C.B. Mass	Pump It Up PREX 2	A Whistle featured samples from "I'll Be Around" by The Spinners
Gentleman Quality 젠틀맨 퀄리티	C.B. Mass	Pump It Up PREX 2	
Run Away 런 어웨이	To-Ya	Pump It Up PREX 2	
Swing Baby 스윙 베이비	Park Jin Young	Pump It Up PREX 2	
Temptation 템테이션	Harisu	Pump It Up PREX 2	
Y	Kim Gun Mo	Pump It Up PREX 2	Y and the album "#007 Another Days..." were released in 2001.
Perfect! 딱이야	Diva	Pump It Up Zero	
Let's Boogie 렛츠 부기	Turtles	Pump It Up PREX 2	
My Best Day is Gone 내 생에 봄날은 간다	Can	Pump It Up PREX 2	
The Waves 파도	UN	Pump It Up Premiere 3	
Always 얼웨이스	Boy Club	Pump It Up Premiere 3	
Vook 부크	BanYa	Present	
Csikos Post 우편마차	BanYa	Present	Csikos Post is a remix of "Csikós Post" by Hermann Necke.

=== Premiere 3 (2003) ===
Song title (English/Korean)	Artist	Latest appearance	Notes
Bambole	Papa Gonzales	Pump It Up Exceed 2/Pro	
Bee 비	BanYa	Present	Bee is a remix of "Flight of the Bumblebee" by Nikolai Rimsky-Korsakov.
Burning Krypt	B-Legit, 2Wice & 4Tray	Pump It Up Exceed	
Can You Feel Dis or Dat	2Wice	Pump It Up Exceed	Can You Feel Dis or Dat's original title is "Can You Feel Dis?".
Clap Your Hands	Scoop feat. Joyce Lyle	Pump It Up NX	
Conga	Queen Latin	Pump It Up NX	Conga is a cover remix of "Conga" by Miami Sound Machine.
D Gang 디 갱	BanYa	Present	
DJ Nightmare	Rodney O & Joe Cooley	Pump It Up Exceed	
Eres Para Mi	Mozquito	Pump It Up NX	
Fiesta Macarena Pt. 1	DJ Paula	Pump It Up Exceed 2	Fiesta Macarena Pt. 1 is a cover of the 1978 medley Disco Samba by Los Mayos. The songs included from the original, in order, are "Charlie Brown", "Festa Para Um Rei Negro", "Brigitte Bardot", "Caramba Galileu da Galiléia", and "País Tropical".
Hello 헬로우	BanYa	Present	
On Your Side	Kay Kent	Pump It Up Exceed 2	
Everybody	Carlos T. Quila	Pump It Up Exceed 2	Everybody's original title is "Everybody (T-quila Sunrise Mix)".
Join the Party	Gans	Pump It Up NX	
Lay it Down	Fresno	Pump It Up Exceed 2	Lay it Down samples Gerald Mallory's "Lay it Down (1982 song)"
Let the Sunshine	Lisa Cool & The South Spirit	Pump It Up Exceed 2/Pro	Let the Sunshine is a cover version of "Let the Sunshine In" within the medley with "Aquarius" by The 5th Dimension
Lovething	Down Low	Pump It Up Exceed	
Mexi Mexi	Mozquito	Pump It Up NX	Middle part of Mexi Mexi is based on "Better Off Alone" by Alice Deejay.
You Don't Wanna Runup	Rodney O & Joe Cooley	Pump It Up Exceed	
Beat of the War 비트 오브 더 워	BanYa	Present	Beat of the War is based on "Holy Wars... The Punishment Due" by Megadeth.

=== PREX 3 (October 2003) ===
Song title (English/Korean)	Artist	Latest appearance	Notes
Empire of the Sun 태양의 나라	Novasonic	Pump It Up Fiesta 2	Empire of the Sun marks the first game in Pump It Up series where only one K-Pop license is included. Empire of the Sun is the first new song by Novasonic since Pump It Up Perfect Collection. Empire of the Sun is the final song by Novasonic in the series.
Just a Girl	No Doubt	None	Cancelled song
Let's Get the Party Started	P!nk	Pump It Up Exceed	Let's Get the Party Started's original title is "Get the Party Started". Let's Get the Party Started is the only Pop song licensed for Pump It Up PREX 3 that was not cancelled.
Objection	Shakira	None	Cancelled song
It's My Party	Thalía	None	Cancelled song
Come To Me 컴 투 미	BanYa	Present	Come To Me (BanYa) marks the first game in Pump It Up series where only one PIU Original song is included.
Music	Madonna	None	Cancelled song
Master of Puppets	Metallica	None	Cancelled song

=== Exceed (2004) ===
Song title (English/Korean)	Artist	Latest appearance	Notes
Final Audition 3 U.F 파이널 오디션 3	BanYa	Present	Final Audition 3 U.F is the final song of original Final Audition series of songs.
Naissance 2 태동 2	BanYa	Present	Naissance 2 is a remix of Naissance from Pump It Up 3rd Dance Floor O.B.G
Monkey Fingers 몽키 핑거즈	BanYa	Present	Monkey Fingers is a hidden song in Pump It Up Exceed and Exceed 2.
Blazing 블레이징	BanYa	Present	
Pump Me Amadeus 펌프 미 아마데우스	BanYa	Present	Pump Me Amadeus is a remix of "Symphony No. 25" by Wolfgang Amadeus Mozart.
X-Treme 엑스트림	BanYa	Present	Since Pump It Up NX, X-Treme was renamed to X-tream
Get Up! 겟 업!	BanYa	Present	Get Up! is a remix of "Symphony No. 9" by Ludwig van Beethoven.
Dignity 디그니티	Crash	Present	Dignity is revived in Pump It Up XX version 1.04.0 after its removal in Pump It Up Prime 2
Shake That Bootie 자, 엉덩이	OneTwo	Pump It Up NX	
Valenti 발렌티	BoA	Pump It Up NX ver. 1.05	
What Do You Really Want? 니가 진짜로 원하는게 뭐야?	Crash	Pump It Up Prime	What Do You Really Want? (Crash) is another cover version of Shin Hae Chul's song of the same name since its first cover in Pump It Up 1st Dance Floor by Monochrome
Go 가	U;Nee	Pump It Up Fiesta 2	Go and the album "U;Nee Code" were released in 2003, when U;Nee passed away 4 years after.
Flamenco 플라멘코	Oliver	Pump It Up Exceed 2	
Kiss Me	Debbie Scott	Pump It Up NX	Kiss Me is a cover version of Sixpence None The Richer's song of the same name.
Essa Maneira	Kaoma	Pump It Up NX2	
Ba Be Loo Be Ra	Kristeen	Pump It Up Exceed 2/Pro	Ba Be Loo Be Ra's original title is written as "Ba Be Loo Be La".
La Cubanita	Los Ninos de Sara	Pump It Up NX2	
Shake it Up	ROD	Pump It Up NX2	
One Love 원 러브	S'Max	Pump It Up NX	
Power of Dream	Victoria	Pump It Up NX2	
Watch Out	Victoria	Pump It Up NX2	
Fiesta	El Cuba	Pump It Up NX	Fiesta (song) is a remix and cover version of DJ Méndez's song of the same name.
Soca Make Yuh Ram Ram	General Grant	Pump It Up NX2	
Born to be Alive	P. Hernandez & B. Thomas	Pump It Up Exceed 2	Born to be Alive is a cover version of song of the same name by Patrick Hernandez, sung by Belen Thomas.
Xibom Bombom	Los Del Ritmo	Pump It Up Exceed 2	Xibom Bombom is a cover version of As Meninas's song of the same name.
Oh! Rosa (Spanish) 오! 로사 (스페인어)	BanYa	Pump It Up Exceed 2	Oh! Rosa (Spanish) is a hidden song in Pump It Up Exceed and Exceed 2.
First Love (Spanish) 첫사랑 (스페인어)	BanYa	Pump It Up Exceed 2	First Love (Spanish) is a hidden song in Pump It Up Exceed and Exceed 2.
A Little Less Conversation	Elvis Presley (Junkie XL Remix)	Exclusive	Exceed S.E only
I Love You Baby	Pandera	Pump It Up NX/Pro	I Love You Baby is the first song and the only Pump It Up Exceed S.E song crossed over to mainline Pump It Up arcade series: Zero and NX.
Let's Groove	Earth, Wind & Fire	Exclusive	Exceed S.E only
Name of the Game	The Crystal Method	Exclusive	Exceed S.E only
Rapper's Delight	Sugarhill Gang	Exclusive	Exceed S.E only
Walkie Talkie Man	Steriogram	Exclusive	Exceed S.E only

=== Exceed 2 (November 2004) ===
Song title (English/Korean)	Artist	Latest appearance	Notes
Greenhorn 애송이	Lexy	Pump It Up NXA	
Hot HOT뜨거	1TYM	Pump It Up Prime	
Pray 바래	Som2	Pump It Up NX2	
Go Away 떠나버려	BMK	Pump It Up Zero	
Drunken In Melody 만취 인 멜로디	Eun Ji Won	Pump It Up NXA	
Deja Vu 예지몽	Som2	Pump It Up Prime 2	
U 너너	Ju Dain	Pump It Up NX World Tour	
Sajahu 사자후	Lee Hyun Do	Pump It Up Prime	Sajahu is known as "Lion's Roar" Sajahu is the first new song by Lee Hyun Do since Pump It Up Extra.
Typhoon 폭풍	Lee Hyun Do	Pump It Up NX2	Typhoon is known as "You Got The Funk".
Eternity 이터니티	Uhm Jung Hwa	Pump It Up Zero	Eternity is the first new song by Uhm Jung Hwa since Pump It Up 1st Dance Floor.
Foxy Lady 폭시 레이디	Harisu	Pump It Up NX	Foxy Lady is the first new song by Harisu since Pump It Up Rebirth.
Too Late 투 레잇	Shyne	Pump It Up NX	
I'll Give You All My Love 내게 남은 사랑을 다 줄께	WAX	Pump It Up Prime 2	I'll Give You All My Love is a cover, different lyrics version of "내게 남은 사랑을 드릴께요" by Jang Hye Ri.
Huu Yah Yeh 후야예	Y*Me	Pump It Up NX	
We Don't Stop 위 돈 스탑	Asoto Union	Pump It Up NX	
J Bong 제이 봉	BanYa	Present	
Hi-Bi 하이 바이	BanYa	Present	
Solitary 2 무혼 2 (武魂 2)	BanYa	Present	Solitary 2 is a sequel to Solitary from Pump It Up 3rd Dance Floor S.E. Solitary 2 is a hidden song in Pump It Up Exceed 2.
Canon-D 캐논 디	BanYa	Present	Canon-D is a remix of "Canon in D" by Johann Pachelbel.
Le Code de Bonne Conduite	Manresa	Pump It Up NX2	Le Code de Bonne Conduite marks the first game in the series where only one Pop license is included in a game, unlike the Pump It Up PREX 3 with a handful of cancelled Pop songs.
Novarash Remix 노바래쉬 리믹스	Novasonic & Crash	Pump It Up Fiesta 2	Mixes Empire of the Sun and What Do You Really Want? (Crash)
Lexy & 1TYM Remix 렉시 & 원타임 리믹스	Lexy & 1TYM	Pump It Up NXA World Max	Known as "1TYM Lexy Remix" Mixes Greenhorn and Hot
Treme Vook of the War Remix 트림 북 오브 더 워	BanYa	Present	Known as "Tream Vook of the War Remix" Mixes X-Treme, Vook and Beat of the War
BanYa Classic Remix 반야 클래식 리믹스	BanYa	Present	Mixes Beethoven Virus, Winter and Pump Me Amadeus
Exceed 2 Deux Remix 익시드2 듀스 리믹스	Deux	Pump It Up NX2	Mixes Come Back To Me, We Are and As I Told U
Exceed 2 Diva's Remix 익시드2 디바 리믹스	BoA/Shyne/Y*Me	Pump It Up NX	Mixes Valenti, Too Late and Huu Yah Yeah
World Remix 월드 리믹스	Down Low/Mozquito/BMK/Uhm Jung Hwa	Pump It Up Zero	Mixes Lovething, Eres Para Mi, Go Away and Eternity World Remix is the first World Music remixed song in the series.
Dignity Full Remix 디그니티 Fullmix	Crash	Present	Dignity Full Remix is the first full K-pop song in the series. Dignity Full Remix is revived in Pump It Up XX version 1.04.0 after its removal in Pump It Up Prime 2.
Canon-D Full Song Mix 캐논 D Fullmix	BanYa	Present	Canon-D Full Song Mix is the first full PIU Original song in the series. Canon-D Full Song Mix is a hidden song in Pump It Up Exceed 2.

=== Zero (2006) ===
Song title (English/Korean)	Artist	Latest appearance	Notes
Beat of the War 2 비트 오브 더 워 2	BanYa	Present	Beat of the War 2 is a sequel to Beat of the War from Pump It Up Premiere 3. Beat of the War 2 is based on "Holy Wars... The Punishment Due" by Megadeth.
Moonlight 월광	BanYa	Present	Moonlight is a remix of "Moonlight Sonata" 3rd Movement by Ludwig van Beethoven.
Witch Doctor 위치 닥터	BanYa	Present	Witch Doctor is a hidden song in Pump It Up Zero.
Love is a Danger Zone 2 러브 이즈 어 댄저 존 pt.2	BanYa	Present	Love is a Danger Zone 2 is a sequel to Love is a Danger Zone from Pump It Up Rebirth.
Phantom 팬텀	BanYa	Present	Phantom is an instrumental remix of "The Phantom of the Opera" by Andrew Lloyd Webber.
Papa Gonzales 파파 곤잘레스	BanYa	Present	
Jump 점프	BanYa	Present	After its removal in Pump It Up NX (WorldMax-exclusive in Pump It Up NXA), Jump was revived in Pump It Up XX. Jump samples "Day-O" by Harry Belafonte.
Emergency 긴급상황	Drunken Tiger	Pump It Up NX2	Emergency is the first new song by Drunken Tiger since Pump It Up 1st Dance Floor.
My Friend 친구여	Cho PD	Pump It Up Fiesta 2	My Friend is the first new song by Cho PD since Pump It Up 2nd Dance Floor. After its removal in Pump It Up NXA, My Friend was revived in Pump It Up Fiesta EX.
Wuthering Heights 폭풍의 언덕	Eugene	Pump It Up NX2	
Do It Yourself 두 잇 유어 셀프	LazyBone	Pump It Up NX2	
What's Going On? 왜 이래	Turtles	Pump It Up NX2	What's Going On? is the first new song by Turtles since Pump It Up Rebirth. What's Going On? is Turtles's final song in Pump It Up series due to the death of Lim Sung-hoon (a.k.a. "Turtleman").
All Famy 올빼미	Eun Ji Won	Exclusive	All Famy is one of the several K-Pop licensed songs that were cut in the next game, due to licensing issues.
Chung Hwa Ban Jeom 중화반점	Louis	Pump It Up Prime 2	After its removal in Pump It Up NXA, Chung Hwa Ban Jeom was revived in Pump It Up Fiesta EX.
Mr. Fire Fighter 소방관 아저씨	Spooky Banana	Pump It Up Fiesta 2/Infinity	
Footprints 발자국	T.O	Pump It Up NX2	Footprints marks the first non-PIU Original arcade song that uses the cut version of its official music video.
Oh My! 어머나	Jang Yoon Jung	Pump It Up NX2	
Enter the Dragon 엔터 더 드래곤	JTL	Pump It Up Fiesta 2	Enter the Dragon is based on "Theme from Enter the Dragon" by Lalo Schifrin.
Storm 스톰	Perry	Pump It Up Fiesta 2	
Turn Around 돌아	Mina	Pump It Up NX2	
Up Up 업 업	Cachy Huang	Pump It Up NX	Up Up is the cover version of "招牌動作 (Signature Move)" by Jolin Tsai.
Love is a Danger Zone 2: Try to B.P.M 러브 이즈 어 댄저 존 2 Try To B.P.M	BanYa	Present	Mixes Love is a Danger Zone and Love is a Danger Zone 2
K-Hip-Hop Mix 가요 힙합 믹스	JTL/Perry/Drunken Tiger/Eun Ji Won	Pump It Up NX2	Mixes Enter the Dragon, Storm, Emergency and Drunken In Melody
K-House Mix 가요 하우스 믹스	Turtles/Cho PD/Harisu/Jang Yoon Jung	Pump It Up NX	Mixes What's Going On?, My Friend, Foxy Lady and Oh My!
Love is a Danger Zone 2 (Another) 러브 이즈 어 댄저 존 pt.2	BanYa	Present	Love is a Danger Zone 2 (Another) is the final song by BanYa team in the series.

=== NX (New Xenesis) (December 2006) ===
Song title (English/Korean)	Artist	Latest appearance	Notes
Witch Doctor #1 위치 닥터 #1	Yahpp	Present	Witch Doctor #1 is the first song by Yahpp in the series, marking his separation from the BanYa group. Witch Doctor #1 is the remix, slower version of Witch Doctor.
Arch of Darkness 아크 오브 다크니스	Yahpp	Present	Arch of Darkness promotes Andamiro's survival arcade online shooter game, "ArchShade" which, however, was never released.
Chimera 키메라	Yahpp	Present	Chimera is the remix of "Queen of the Night" in "The Magic Flute" by Wolfgang Amadeus Mozart.
Go Back 고백	Dynamic Duo	Pump It Up NX2	
Fly 플라이	Epik High	Pump It Up Fiesta 2	After its removal in Pump It Up NXA, Fly was revived in Pump It Up Fiesta.
One Night 원 나잇	DJ DOC	Pump It Up Fiesta 2	One Night is the first new song by DJ DOC since Pump It Up Extra.
U Inside My Dim Memory 흐린 기억속의 그대	Hyun Jin Young vs. Yahpp	Pump It Up NX2	U Inside My Dim Memory is the first K-Pop song remixed by Yahpp.
Free! 자유로와	Jiny	Pump It Up NX2	
Lovely 사랑스러워	Kim Jong Kook	Pump It Up NX2	
Terminal Depository 종점보관소	Ururbu Project	Pump It Up NX2	
For You 그대에게	N.EX.T	Pump It Up NX2	For You is the first new song by N.EX.T since Pump It Up Extra.
Snow Dream 스노우 드림	Apple Jam	Pump It Up NX2	Snow Dream is the cover version of "Christmas Memories" by Beautiful Day from O2Jam.
Handsome Character That Pass 지나가던 꽃미남 캐릭터다	May	Pump It Up NX2	
2006 Love Song 사랑가 2006	BanYa Production	Present	2006 Love Song is the first song by BanYa Production in the series, rebranded from "BanYa" since Yahpp's separation. 2006 Love Song is a remake of Betrayer in Pump It Up 4th Dance Floor S.E.
Do You Know That -Old School- 두 유 노우 댓-올드 스쿨	BanYa Production	Present	
Gun Rock 건 락	BanYa Production	Present	
Bullfighter's Song 투우사의 노래	BanYa Production	Present	Bullfighter's Song is a remix of "Toreador Song" in "Carmen" by Georges Bizet.
Ugly Dee 미운 오리새끼	BanYa Production	Present	Ugly Dee is a remix of "Swan Lake" by Pyotr Ilyich Tchaikovsky.
Hyun Jin Young Go Jin Young Go 현진영Go 진영Go	Hyun Jin Young	Pump It Up NX2	Hyun Jin Young Go Jin Young Go is a remix version from Hyun Jin Young's 2002 album, "Wild Gangster Hiphop".
My Brother is Street Singer 오빠는 풍각쟁이야	Park Hyang Lim vs. Yahpp	Pump It Up NX2	My Brother is Street Singer is the remix of "오빠는 풍각쟁이야" by same name.
So 그래서	Typhoon	Pump It Up NXA World Max	
Hold the Line 홀드 더 라인	Cho PD & B.E.G	Pump It Up NX2	
Hybs 힙스	DJ Dookie	Pump It Up Fiesta 2	
Throw 'Em Up 쓰로움 업	Andrew Kim	Pump It Up NXA World Max (version 1.06)	
Bust Back 버스트 백	DVS	Pump It Up NX2 World Max	
Haley 할레이	Sam-I-Am	Pump It Up Fiesta 2	
We Goin' Fly Remix 위 고잉 플라이 리믹스	Gyfted	Pump It Up Fiesta 2	
Final Audition Episode 2–1 파이널 오디션 에피소드 2–1	Yahpp	Present	
Fire Game 불놀이야	Yahpp	Pump It Up NX2	Fire Game is titled "Fire" in-game. Fire Game is the cover version of "불놀이야" by Oxen 80. Fire Game is exclusive to the World Tour channel in Pump It Up NX, and Special Zone and World Max in NX2.
Final Audition Episode 2-2 파이널 오디션 에피소드 2-2	Yahpp	Present	Final Audition Episode 2-2 is a faster remix of Final Audition Episode 2-1.
K-Pop Dance NX 가요 댄스 리믹스	DJ DOC & Epik High	Pump It Up Fiesta 2	Mixes One Night and Fly
Groove Party 그루브 파티	Tashannie & Clon	Pump It Up Prime	Mixes Funky Tonight and Don't Bother Me
Pop House Mix 팝 하우스 믹스	Kristeen/Scoop feat. Joyce Lyle/Fresno	Pump It Up NX2	Mixes Ba Be Loo Be Ra, Clap Your Hands and Lay It Down, despite the two songs besides Clap Your Hands were removed in the previous game Pump It Up Zero.
Wi-Ex-Doc-Va 위엑닥바	Yahpp	Present	Mixes Witch Doctor and Extravaganza
Bemera 비메라	Yahpp	Present	Mixes Chimera and Bee
BanYa-P Classic Mix 반야-P 클래식 믹스	BanYa Production	Present	Mixes Ugly Dee, Bullfighter's Song and Moonlight BanYa-P Classic Mix was revived in Pump It Up XX after its removal in NXA.
Chicago Club Mix 시카고 클럽 믹스	DVS/Andrew Kim/Sam-I-Am/Gyfted	Pump It Up NX2 World Max	Mixes Bust Back, Throw 'Em Up, Haley and We Goin' Fly Remix
U Inside My Dim Memory (Full Song) 흐린 기억속의 그대	Hyun Jin Young vs. Yahpp	Pump It Up NX2	
Fire Game (Full Song) 불놀이야	Yahpp	Pump It Up NX2	Fire Game (Full Song) is titled "Fire" in-game.
Lovely (Full Song) 사랑스러워	Kim Jong Kook	Pump It Up NX2	
Love is a Danger Zone 2 (Full Song) 러브 이즈 어 댄저 존 2 풀송	Yahpp	Present	
Beat of the War 2 (Full Song) 비트 오브 더 워 2 풀송	Yahpp	Present	
Hold the Line (Full Song) 홀드 더 라인	Cho PD & B.E.G	Pump It Up NX2	
My Name	BoA	None	Cancelled song My Name was meant to be the first new song by BoA since Pump It Up Exceed but it was shelved due to licensing issues.
Left Handed	Panic	None	Cancelled song
Up & Down	Diva	None	Cancelled song Up & Down (Diva) was meant to be the first new song by Diva since Pump It Up Rebirth but it was shelved due to licensing issues.
What Is It	Shim Tae Yoon	None	Cancelled song
Later, Later	Jang Yoon Jung	None	Cancelled song
Beat of the War 2 (D&G ver.) 비트 오브 더 워 2	Yahpp (BanYa)	Pump It Up Fiesta 2 Mission Zone	Beat of the War 2 (D&G Ver.) is known as "Beat of the War 2 (Another)"

=== NX2 (Next Xenesis) (2007) ===
Song title (English/Chinese/Korean)	Artist	Latest appearance	Notes
Solitary 1.5 무혼 1.5	Yahpp	Present	Solitary 1.5 is a remix of Solitary from Pump It Up 3rd Dance Floor S.E. Solitary 1.5 serves as a prequel to Solitary in Pump It Up 3rd Dance Floor S.E. and Solitary 2 in Pump It Up Exceed 2. Solitary 1.5 is a hidden song in Pump It Up NX2, and it can be made playable by inserting Andamiro's special USB flash drive.
Beat the Ghost 비트 더 고스트	BanYa Production	Present	
Caprice of Otada 카프리스 오브 오타다	BanYa Production	Present	Caprice of Otada is the remix of "Rhapsody on a Theme of Paganini (Caprice #24)" by Sergei Rachmaninoff.
Money 머니	BanYa Production	Present	
Monkey Fingers 2 몽키 핑거즈 2	BanYa Production	Present	Monkey Fingers 2 is a remix of Monkey Fingers from Pump it Up Exceed.
Nice to Meet You 반갑습니다	Bae Chi Gi	Pump It Up NXA	
Very Old Couples 아주 오래된 연인들	015B	Pump It Up Fiesta 2	
Get My Phone Call 전화받어	Mina	Pump It Up NXA	Get My Phone Call is the first new song by Mina since Pump It Up Zero.
Shiny Day 햇살 좋은 날	Joanne	Pump It Up NXA	
A.U Ready? 아 유 레디?	Gil Gun	Pump It Up NXA	
V.I.P	Bada	Pump It Up NXA	
Faster Z 패스터 Z	Yahpp	Present	Faster Z is a remix of "Zigeunerweisen" by Pablo de Sarasate.
Pumptris Quattro 펌트리스 꽈뜨로	Yahpp	Present	Pumptris Quattro is a Tetris-themed medley that includes the Russian folk songs "Kalinka" by Petrovich Larionov, "Korobeiniki" and "Katyusha".
It's My Business 내맘이야	Taiji Boys	Pump It Up Fiesta 2 Mission Zone	It's My Business is the first new song by Taiji Boys since Pump It Up Perfect Collection. It's My Business and the album "Seo Taiji and Boys III" were released in mid-1994. It's My Business's final appearance on Pump It Up Fiesta 2 had no audio after Pump It Up NXA because of copyright issues.
You Fall in Me 넌 내게 반했어	No Brain	Pump It Up NXA	
A Maelstrom 소용돌이	Pia	Pump It Up NXA	
Astral Song 신기한 노래	Crying Nut	Pump It Up NXA	Astral Song is the first new song by Crying Nut since Pump It Up Extra. Astral Song is a punk cover of Russian folk song "Korobeiniki".
No Despair 좌절금지	Hot Potato	Pump It Up NXA	No Despair is a hidden song in Pump It Up NX2, and it can be made playable by inserting Andamiro's special USB flash drive.
Compunction 후회	May	Pump It Up NXA	
Beat # No. 4 비트 샵 넘버4	HEaDTriP	Pump It Up Prime	
Come Back Home 컴 백 홈	Taiji Boys	Pump It Up NXA	Come Back Home and the album "Seo Taiji and Boys IV" were released in late 1995, when Seo Taiji and Boys retired a year after.
Feel the Soul 필 더 소울	Seo Taiji	Pump It Up NXA	Feel the Soul is a first new song by Seo Taiji since Pump It Up Perfect Collection, despite his album "Ultramania" being released in 2000.
Guitar Man 기타 맨	BanYa Production	Present	
Higgledy Piggledy 히글디 피글디	BanYa Production	Present	Higgledy Piggledy is a mix of classical crossover remixes: "Habanera" by Georges Bizet and "Por una Cabeza" by Carlos Gardel.
Jam O Beat 잼 오 비트	BanYa Production	Present	Jam O Beat features samples from "Vogue" by Madonna.
Tell Me 텔미	Wonder Girls	Pump It Up NXA	Korean version only in Pump It Up NX2 Tell Me (Wonder Girls) is later added to the international release of Pump It Up NXA Tell Me features samples from Two of Hearts by Stacey Q
BanYa-P Guitar Remix 반야-P 기타 리믹스	BanYa Production	Present	Mixes Gun Rock, Phantom, Guitar Man and Beat the Ghost
Guitar Man (Full Song) 기타 맨	BanYa Production	Pump It Up Infinity	
Money Fingers 머니 핑거즈	BanYa Production	Present	Mixes Money and Monkey Fingers
Monkey Fingers (Full Song) 몽키 핑거즈	BanYa Production	Pump It Up Infinity	
NX2 K-Pop Remix 1 NX2 가요 리믹스 1	U;Nee/Duke/Lee Hyun Do	Pump It Up NXA	Mixes Go, Starian and Sajahu
NX2 Hip-Hop Remix NX2 힙합 리믹스	Eun Ji Won & Dynamic Duo	Exclusive	Mixes Drunken in Melody and Go Back
Astral Song (Full Song) 신기한 노래	Crying Nut	Exclusive	
NX2 K-Pop Remix 2 NX2 가요 리믹스 2	Mina & Bae Chi Gi	Pump It Up NXA	Mixes Get My Phone Call and Nice to Meet You
No Despair (Full Song) 좌절금지	Hot Potato	Exclusive	
NX2 K-Pop Remix 3 NX2 가요 리믹스 3	Lee Hyun Do & Som2	Exclusive	Mixes Typhoon and Pray
NX2 Diva Remix NX2 디바 리믹스	Joanne & Bada	Pump It Up NXA	Mixes Shiny Day and V.I.P
Pro Pop Remix 프로 팝 리믹스	Sonic Dimension & Oscillator X	Exclusive (World Max only)	Mixes Chopstix and Dance All Night
May Remix 메이 리믹스	May	Exclusive (World Max only)	Mixes Handsome Character that Pass and Compunction
Red Remix 빨개송	Yahpp	Exclusive (World Max only)	Mixes She Likes Pizza, Monkey Fingers, What Do You Really Want? (Crash), Drunken in Melody, U (JuDain), Foxy Lady and Hot
It's My Business (Full Song) 내맘이야	Taiji Boys	Pump It Up NXA World Max	
Very Old Couples (Full Song) 아주 오래된 연인들	015B	Exclusive	
Come Back Home (Full Song) 컴 백 홈	Taiji Boys	Pump It Up NXA	
Feel the Soul (Full Song) 필 더 소울	Seo Taiji	Pump It Up NXA World Max	
V.I.P (Full Song)	Bada	Pump It Up NXA	
A Maelstrom (Full Song) 소용돌이	Pia	Pump It Up NXA World Max	
Fly (Full Song) 플라이	Epik High	Pump It Up Fiesta 2	After its removal in Pump It Up NXA, Fly (Full Song) was revived in Pump It Up Fiesta
Tell Me (Full Song) 텔미	Wonder Girls	Pump It Up NXA	Korean version only in Pump It Up NX2 Tell Me (Full Song) is later added to the international release of Pump It Up NXA
Fist of Fury 精舞門 정무문	Show Lo (Original)	Pump It Up NXA Easy Station	Chinese version only in Pump It Up NX2
Long Live the Chinese 華人萬歲 화인만세	Wang Lee Hom (Original)	Pump It Up NXA Easy Station	Chinese version only in Pump It Up NX2
Fire	Karen Mok (Original)	Exclusive	Chinese version only in Pump It Up NX2
J-game 野蠻遊戲	Jolin Tsai (Original)	Exclusive	Chinese version only in Pump It Up NX2
One Last Chance	Energy (Original)	Exclusive	Chinese version only in Pump It Up NX2
Mechanical Doll 機器娃娃	Show Lo (Original)	Exclusive	Chinese version only in Pump It Up NX2
Take It Off 脫掉	Alex To (Original)	Exclusive	Chinese version only in Pump It Up NX2
Deja Vu (Full Song) 예지몽	Som2	Pump It Up Prime 2	
Typhoon (Full Song) 폭풍	Lee Hyun Do	Pump It Up NXA World Max	
I'll Give You All My Love (Full Song) 내게 남은 사랑을 다 줄께	WAX	Pump It Up Infinity	World Max only in NX2 and NXA Added to Arcade Mode in Infinity version 1.10+
Moonlight (Original ver.) 월광	BanYa	Pump It Up NXA World Max (Fiesta EX bug in Arcade)	
Witch Docva 위치 닥바	Yahpp	Pump It Up Fiesta 2 Mission Zone	Mixes Witch Doctor and the ending part of Extravaganza.
Phantom (Speed Up ver.) 팬텀	BanYa Production	Pump It Up Fiesta 2 Mission Zone	
Emergency (Full Song) 긴급상황	Drunken Tiger	Exclusive (World Max only)	
Mr. Fire Fighter (Full Song) 소방관 아저씨	Spooky Banana	Pump It Up Infinity	World Max only in NX2 and NXA Mission Zone only in Fiesta, Fiesta EX and Fiesta 2 Added to Arcade Mode in Infinity version 1.10+
Free (Full Song) 자유로와	Jiny	Exclusive (World Max only)	
For You (Full Song) 그대에게	N.EX.T	Exclusive (World Max only)	
Very Old Couples (Short Term Memory ver.) 아주 오래된 연인들	015B	Pump It Up Fiesta 2 Mission Zone	
A.U Ready? (Full Song) 아 유 레디?	Gil Gun	Pump It Up NXA World Max	
Pumptris 8bit ver. 펌트리스 8비트 ver.	Yahpp	Present	Pumptris 8bit ver. is an 8-bit version of Pumptris Quattro.
You Fall in Me (Full Song) 넌 내게 반했어	No Brain	Pump It Up NXA World Max	
Astral Song (Alternate ver.) 신기한 노래	Crying Nut	Pump It Up NXA World Max	
No Despair (Alternate ver.) 좌절금지	Hot Potato	Pump It Up NXA World Max	
Beat # No. 4 (Alternate ver.) 비트 샵 넘버4	HEaDTriP	Pump It Up NXA World Max	
Beat # No. 4 (Full Song) 비트 샵 넘버4	HEaDTriP	Pump It Up Prime	
Final Audition 3 & Chimera Remix 파이널 오디션 3 & 키메라 리믹스	Yahpp	Pump It Up Fiesta 2 Mission Zone	Mixes Final Audition 3 U.F and Chimera
Yasangma 야생마	Yahpp	Pump It Up Fiesta 2 Mission Zone	Mixes Pumptris 8bit ver. and Canon-D added with horse sounds.
Mr. Fire Fighter & Beat of the War 2 소방관 아저씨 & 비트 오브 더 워 2	Spooky Banana & Yahpp	Pump It Up NXA World Max	Mixes Mr. Fire Fighter and Beat of the War 2

=== NXA (NX Absolute) (2008) ===
Song title (English/Korean)	Artist	Latest appearance	Notes
Blaze Emotion 블레이즈 이모션	Yahpp	Present	
Cannon X.1 캐논 X.1	Yahpp	Present	Cannon X.1 is a rock remix of Canon-D by BanYa from Pump It Up Exceed 2.
Chopsticks Challenge 젓가락 변주곡	Yahpp	Present	
LaLaLa 라 라 라	BigBang	Pump It Up Fiesta 2	
Adios 아디오스	Eun Ji Won	Pump It Up Fiesta 2	Adios is the first new song of Eun Ji Won since Pump It Up Zero.
Slightly 살짝쿵	45RPM	Pump It Up Fiesta 2	
I Am Your Girl 아임 유어 걸	S.E.S	Pump It Up Fiesta EX	I Am Your Girl is the first new song by S.E.S since Pump It Up 2nd Dance Floor.
Only You 너만 볼래	Namolla Family	Pump It Up Fiesta EX	
Chocolate 초콜릿	Banana Girl	Pump It Up Fiesta EX	
Forward 포워드	DJ Missill	Pump It Up Fiesta 2	
Uprock 업 락	Sam-I-Am	Pump It Up Fiesta 2	
Crazy 크레이지	Gyfted	Pump It Up Fiesta 2	
Panuelito Rojo 붉은 손수건	Big Metra	Pump It Up Prime 2	
Procedimientos para llegar a un común acuerdo 잘가 내 사랑	Pxndx	Pump It Up Prime 2	
Digan Lo Que Digan 나완 상관없어	Nina Pilots	Pump It Up Prime 2	
Pump Breakers 펌프 브레이커스	Thaide & Lil V	Pump It Up Fiesta 2	Pump Breakers' lyrics is related to Pump It Up series.
Change Myself 체인지 마이 셀프	Wang Lee Hom (Original)	Pump It Up Fiesta 2	Change Myself's original title is "改變自己 (Change Me)".
Come On! 와	Lee Jung Hyun	Pump It Up Fiesta EX	Come On! uses a Chinese lyrics version. Come On! is a Chinese cover of the song of the same name, despite its album "Let's Go to My Star" being released in late 1999.
Bad Character 못된 성질	Jang Na Ra	Pump It Up Fiesta EX	Bad Character is one of the Chinese lyrics songs by Jang Na Ra.
U 유	Super Junior M	Pump It Up Fiesta EX	U (Super Junior M) is the Chinese cover version of Super Junior's song of the same name.
Breakin' Love 브레이킨 러브	Steve Yoo	Pump It Up Fiesta EX	Breakin' Love is the first new song by Yoo Seung Jun since Pump It Up Extra. Breakin' Love uses Chinese lyrics due to Yoo Seung Jun being banned from South Korea.
The People Didn't Know 사람들은 몰랐다네	BanYa Production	Present	
DJ Otada 디제이 오타다	BanYa Production	Present	DJ Otada is the remix of "Trumpet Concerto" 3rd Movement by Joseph Haydn.
K.O.A -Alice in Wonderworld- 케이.오.에이 : 엘리스 인 원더월드	BanYa Production	Present	K.O.A -Alice in Wonderworld- is the remix of "Six moments musicaux op.94-3" by Franz Schubert.
My Dreams 마이 드림즈	BanYa Production	Present	My Dreams's middle part shares similarities with "Feel Good Inc." by Gorillaz.
Toccata 토카타	BanYa Production	Present	Toccata is the remix of "Toccata and Fugue in D minor" by Johann Sebastian Bach.
Do It! 두 잇!	House Rulez	Pump It Up Fiesta 2	Do It! was available only in NXA 2009 event
Dawn of the Apocalypse 돈 오브 더 아포칼립스	Vassline	Pump It Up Prime 2	Dawn of the Apocalypse was available only in NXA 2009 event
Final Audition Episode 2-X 파이널 오디션 에피소드 2-X	Yahpp	Present	Final Audition Episode 2-X was available only in NXA 2009 event Final Audition Episode 2-X is the remix of Final Audition Episode 2-1 from Pump It Up NX. Final Audtion Episode 2-X is the final song of the "Final Audition" series of songs as well as the fourth song of the "Final Audition Episode" spin-off series of songs.
45RPM & Eun Ji Won Mix 45알피엠 & 은지원 믹스	45RPM & Eun Ji Won	Pump It Up Fiesta 2	Mixes Slightly and Adios
The People Didn't Know "Pumping Up" 사람들은 펌핑업을 몰랐다네	BanYa Production	Present	Mixes The People Didn't Know and Pumping Up
Ugly Duck Toccata 미운 오리 토카타	BanYa Production	Present	Mixes Ugly Dee and Toccata Ugly Duck Toccata was later revived in Pump It Up XX.
Caprice of DJ Otada 카프리스 오브 디제이 오타다	BanYa Production	Present	Mixes Caprice of Otada and DJ Otada
Dr. KOA 닥터 케이오에이	BanYa Production	Present	Mixes Dr. M and K.O.A -Alice in Wonderworld-
Jam O Beat # No. 4 잼 오 비트 샵 넘버4	BanYa Production & HEaDTriP	Pump It Up Infinity	Mixes Jam O Beat and Beat # No. 4
YG Remix YG 리믹스	BigBang & Perry	Exclusive	Mixes LaLaLa and Storm YG Remix is named after YG Entertainment that houses BigBang and Perry.
Nina Pxndx Mix 니나 판다 믹스	Nina Pilots & Pxndx	Pump It Up Prime 2	Mixes Digan Lo Que Digan and Procedimientos Para Llegar A Un Comun Acuerdo
Big Metra Remix 빅 메트라 리믹스	Big Metra	Pump It Up Prime 2	Mixes Trato De No Trabarme and Panuelito Rojo
NXA Hip-Hop Mix NXA 힙합 믹스	DJ Missill & Gyfted	Exclusive	Mixes Forward and Crazy
Novasonic Mix ver. 3 노바소닉 믹스 ver.3	Novasonic	Pump It Up Fiesta 2	Mixes Another Truth and Slam
Mr. Fire Fighter Falls in Love With Me 소방관 아저씨는 내게 반했어	Spooky Banana & No Brain	Exclusive	Mixes Mr. Fire Fighter and You Fall in Me
J Knows That Old Bong 제이 노우즈 댓 올드 봉	BanYa Production	Exclusive	Mixes J Bong and Do You Know That -Old School-
Turkey Virus 터키 바이러스	BanYa Production	Present	Mixes Turkey March and Beethoven Virus
msgoon RMX pt. 1 엠.에스.군 리믹스 파트.1	msgoon	Pump It Up Prime 2	Mixes Jam O Beat and Beat # No. 4 msgoon RMX pt. 1 is the remix of Jam O Beat # No. 4.
msgoon RMX pt. 2 엠.에스.군 리믹스 파트.2	msgoon	Exclusive	Mixes LaLaLa, Drunken in Melody and Storm
msgoon RMX pt. 3 엠.에스.군 리믹스 파트.3	msgoon	Pump It Up Prime 2	Mixes Winter and Beethoven Virus
Chopsticks Challenge (Full Song) 젓가락 변주곡	Yahpp	Present	
LaLaLa (Full Song) 라 라 라	BigBang	Pump It Up Fiesta 2	
Adios (Full Song) 아디오스	Eun Ji Won	Exclusive	
Panuelito Rojo (Full Song) 붉은 손수건	Big Metra	Pump It Up Prime 2	
Procedimientos Para Llegar A Un Comun Acuerdo (Full Song) 잘가 내 사랑	Pxndx	Pump It Up Prime 2	
Forward (Full Song) 포워드	DJ Missill	Pump It Up Fiesta 2	
Slightly (Full Song) 살짝쿵	45RPM feat. msgoon	Pump It Up Fiesta 2	
Come On! (Full Song) 와	Lee Jung Hyun	Exclusive	
Chocolate (Full Song) 초콜렛	Banana Girl	Exclusive	
Digan Lo Que Digan (Full Song) 나완 상관없어	Nina Pilots	Pump It Up Prime 2	
Trato De No Trabarme 잠깐이면 돼	Big Metra	Pump It Up Prime 2	Only in NXA 2009 event Trato De No Trabarme is the first song that is only available in the full song.
Crazy (Full Song) 크레이지	Gyfted	Exclusive	
U (Full Song) 유	Super Junior M	Exclusive	
Change Myself (Full Song) 체인지 마이 셀프	Wang Lee Hom (Original)	Exclusive	
Enter the Dragon (Full Song) 엔터 더 드래곤	JTL	Pump It Up Fiesta 2	
Yasangma 2 야생마 2	msgoon	Exclusive (World Max only)	Yasangma 2 is a longer remix of Caprice of Otada and DJ Otada added with horse sounds.
Scream Song 스크림 송	msgoon	Pump It Up Fiesta 2 Mission Zone	Mixes Jam O Beat, Money and Monkey Fingers 2 with screaming sounds, the vocal sample taken from Jam O Beat.
msgoon RMX pt. 4 엠.에스.군 리믹스 파트.4	msgoon	Exclusive (World Max only)	Mixes Chopsticks Challenge and Street Show Down
In Your Fantasy 환상속의 그대	Taiji Boys	Pump It Up Fiesta EX	In Your Fantasy is a techno remix of My Fantasy from Pump It Up Perfect Collection, whose original title is "You, In the Fantasy, Pt. 4 (Techno Taiji Mix)." In Your Fantasy is the first new non-PIU Original remix since Clon's First Love songs. World Max only until In Your Fantasy is made playable by default in version 1.10+ of Pump It Up Fiesta. In Your Fantasy is the final song by Taiji Boys in the series. At the intro of In Your Fantasy, the audio sample of Bart Simpson from The Simpsons episode, "The Crepes of Wrath", saying "Hey man! It's me, Bart Simpson" is played.

=== Fiesta 2010 (2010) ===
Song title (English/Korean)	Artist	Latest appearance	Notes
X-Tree 엑스트리	Yahpp	Present	X-Tree is a mix of various Christmas songs: "Santa Claus Is Comin' to Town" and "Jingle Bell Rock".
Sorceress Elise 소서리스 엘리제	Yahpp	Present	Sorceress Elise is a remix of "Für Elise" by Ludwig van Beethoven. Sorceress Elise is the last song by Yahpp in the series until his next appearance in three consecutive games, Pump It Up Prime, due to his focus on "Hit the Beat", Andamiro's another music rhythm game.
Betrayer -Act 2- 사랑가 -2막-	msgoon	Present	Betrayer -Act 2- is a first remix of Betrayer from Pump It Up 3rd S.E since 2006 Love Song.
Good Life 굿 라이프	Drunken Tiger	Pump It Up Fiesta 2	Good Life is the first new song by Drunken Tiger since Pump It Up Zero, despite its album "The Legend Of..." being released in 2001.
Big Beat 빅 비트	NOW	Pump It Up Fiesta 2	Big Beat and its album "Crossma Beat" was released in 2006.
Exciting 신나	Dynamic Duo	Pump It Up Fiesta 2	Exciting is the first new song by Dynamic Duo since Pump It Up NX., despite its album "Taxi Driver" being released in 2004.
By Chance 우연	Baby V.O.X	Pump It Up Fiesta 2	By Chance is the first new song by Baby V.O.X since Pump It Up 3rd Dance Floor S.E., despite its album "Baby V.O.X Special Album" being released in 2002.
U Got 2 Know 유 갓 투 노우	MAX	Present	U Got 2 Know is the first part of "U Got" series of songs by MAX. U Got 2 Know's and X-Rave's vocal samples were later used in "Fly Away", by TeddyLoid for Panty & Stocking with Garterbelt.
To the Sky 하늘위로	Lexy	Pump It Up Fiesta 2	To The Sky is the first new song by Lexy since Pump It Up Exceed 2, despite its album "Rush" being released in 2007.
The Angel Who Lost Wings 날개 잃은 천사	Roo'Ra	Pump It Up Fiesta 2	The Angel Who Lost Wings is the first new song by Roo'Ra since Pump It Up 4th Dance Floor S.E., despite its album "Angel Without Wings" being released in 1997. The Angel Who Lost Wings' "uno due tre quattro" voice sample is taken from msgoon RMX pt. 2 from Pump It Up NXA.
Innocent 순정	Koyote	Pump It Up Fiesta 2	Innocent and its album "Pure Love" were released in 1998.
Enjoy! Enjoy! 노세 놀아보세	Mu.Ga.Dang	Pump It Up Fiesta 2	Enjoy! Enjoy! and its album "MooGaDang" were released in 2006.
Destination 데스티네이션	SHK	Present	
Twist King 트위스트 킹	Turbo	Pump It Up Fiesta 2	Twist King is the first new song by Turbo since Pump It Up 1st Dance Floor at over ten years, despite its album "New Sensation" was released in 1996.
Fire 파이어	2NE1	Pump It Up Fiesta 2	
Wanna 워너	Kara	Pump It Up Fiesta 2	
Vacuum 진공	Doin	Present	
Narcisista Por Excelencia 자아도취	Pxndx	Pump It Up Prime 2	
No Rhyme No Reason 노 라임 노 리즌	LTJ X-Perience	Pump It Up Fiesta 2	
80s Pop 에이티스 팝	Energy Present	Pump It Up Fiesta 2	80s Pop's original artist name is "Lipstick".
Do It -Reggae Style- 두 잇 레게 스타일	BanYa Production	Present	
Xenesis 제네시스	BanYa Production	Present	Xenesis is a remix of "From the New World" 4th Movement by Antonín Dvořák.
Arirang 아리랑	BanYa Production	Present	Arirang is a remix of the Korean folk song of the same name.
Tek -Club Copenhagen- 테크 -클럽 코펜하겐-	BanYa Production	Present	
Hello William 안녕 윌리엄	BanYa Production	Present	Hello William is a remix of "William Tell Overture" Finale by Gioachino Rossini.
Turkey March -Minimal Tunes- 터키 행진곡 -미니멀튠즈-	BanYa Production	Present	Turkey March -Minimal Tunes- is a slower remix of Turkey March from Pump It Up 3rd Dance Floor O.B.G.
Get Up (and Go) 겟 업 (앤 고)	BanYa Production	Present	Get Up (and Go) is a remix of Get Up! from Pump It Up Exceed.
Phantom -Intermezzo- 팬텀 -인터메조-	BanYa Production	Present	Phantom -Intermezzo- is a remix of Phantom from Pump It Up Zero.
Mission Possible -Blow Back- 미션 파서블 -블로우 백-	BanYa Production	Present	Mission Possible -Blow Back- is a remix of Mission Possible from Pump It Up Rebirth.
Pumping Jumping 펌핑 점핑	BanYa Production	Present	Pumping Jumping is a faster remix of Pump Jump from Pump It Up Perfect Collection.
B.P Classic Remix 반야 프로덕션 클래식 리믹스	BanYa Production	Present	Mixes Hello William, Get Up (And Go), and Xenesis
K-POP Mix (Old & New) 케이팝 믹스 (올드 앤 뉴)	BanYa Production	Pump It Up Fiesta 2	Mixes Starian, Go, and Innocent
PaPa Helloizing 파파 헬로이징	BanYa Production	Present	Mixes Papa Gonzales, Hello and Blazing
B.P Classic Remix 2 반야 프로덕션 클래식 리믹스 2	BanYa Production	Present	Mixes Xenesis, Csikos Post and Moonlight
Hard Core Rock Mix 하드 코어 락 믹스	BanYa Production	Pump It Up Prime 2	Mixes Dawn of the Apocalypse and Dignity
Pro POP Mix 프로 팝 믹스	BanYa Production	Pump It Up Prime 2	Mixes Energizer and Chopstix
Set Up Me2 Mix 셋업 미투 믹스	BanYa Production	Present	Mixes Set Me Up and Dance With Me
msgoon RMX Pt. 5 엠.에스.군 리믹스 파트.5	msgoon	Pump It Up Prime 2	Mixes Toccata, Top City, Pump Jump and Maria
msgoon RMX Pt. 6 엠.에스.군 리믹스 파트.6	msgoon	Present	Mixes Destination and U Got 2 Know
msgoon RMX Pt. 7 엠.에스.군 리믹스 파트.7	msgoon	Pump It Up Fiesta 2	Mixes Chocolate and Do It!
History: We Are The Zest 히스토리 : 우리는 열정이다	msgoon	Pump It Up Fiesta 2	Mixes Enter The Dragon, We Are (Power Up Ver.), Don't Bother Me and Mistake
Narcisista por Excelencia (Full Song) 자아도취	Pxndx	Pump It Up Prime 2	
Dawn of the Apocalypse (Full Song) 돈 오브 더 아포칼립스	Vassline	Pump It Up Prime 2	
Fire (Full Song) 파이어	2NE1	Pump It Up Fiesta 2	
Wanna (Full Song) 워너	Kara	Pump It Up Fiesta 2	
Pump It Up With You 펌프 잇 업 위드 유	msgoon	Pump It Up Fiesta 2	Pump It Up With You features sound effects of insert-coin, pre-Fiesta classic S (that later became AAA+ and AAA in Phoenix), A (AA+, AA, A+, A in Phoenix) and B-rating result (pre-Fiesta version), button-press, and song/menu selection. It also combines Pump it Up opening themes in order: NX2, Exceed 2, PREX 3, Zero, Rebirth, Exceed, and NX.
Final Audition 2 (Shortcut) 파이널 오디션 2	BanYa	Present	
Final Audition 3 U.F (Shortcut) 파이널 오디션 3	BanYa	Present	
Final Audition Episode 2-X (Shortcut) 파이널 오디션 에피소드 2-X	BanYa	Present	
Love is a Danger Zone (Shortcut) 러브 이즈 어 댄저 존	BanYa	Present	
Love is a Danger Zone 2 (Shortcut) 러브 이즈 어 댄저 존 pt.2	BanYa	Present	
Extravaganza (Shortcut) 엑스트라바간자	BanYa	Present	
Chicken Wing (Shortcut) 치킨 윙	BanYa	Present	
Winter (Shortcut) 윈터	BanYa	Present	Winter (Shortcut) is based on the long version of Winter.
Solitary 2 (Shortcut) 무혼 2	BanYa	Present	
Moonlight (Shortcut) 월광	BanYa	Present	
Witch Doctor (Shortcut) 위치 닥터	BanYa	Present	
Exceed 2 Opening 익시드2 오프닝	BanYa	Present	Exceed 2 Opening is the opening theme of Pump It Up Exceed 2. Exceed 2 Opening was a secret, playable "Raw" song in Pump It Up Exceed 2. Even though the song is introduced in Exceed 2, Andamiro considers it as being introduced in Pump It Up Fiesta.
NX Opening NX 오프닝	Yahpp	Present	NX Opening is the opening theme of Pump It Up NX.
K.O.A -Alice in Wonderworld- (Shortcut) 케이.오.에이 : 엘리스 인 원더월드	BanYa Production	Present	
Bemera (Shortcut) 비메라	Yahpp	Present	
Pumptris 8bit ver. (Shortcut) 펌트리스 8비트 ver.	Yahpp	Present	
Destination (Shortcut) 데스티네이션	SHK	Present	
Procedimientos Para Llegar A Un Comun Acuerdo (Shortcut) 잘 가 내 사랑	Pxndx	Pump It Up Prime 2	
Get Up (And Go) 180	BanYa Production	Pump It Up Fiesta 2	Skill Up Zone only Get Up (And Go) 180 is the faster version of Get Up (And Go).
Danger Zone Twins	(Doin)	Pump It Up Fiesta 2	Skill Up Zone only Mixes Love is a Danger Zone and Love is a Danger Zone 2
Horse Mix	(Doin)	Pump It Up Fiesta 2	Skill Up Zone only Mixes Winter, Pump Me Amadeus and Hello William
Witch Core	(Doin)	Pump It Up Fiesta 2	Skill Up Zone only Mixes Dawn of the Apocalypse, Dignity and Witch Doctor
BPM Collection 3 (Pumptris)	(Doin)	Pump It Up Fiesta 2	Skill Up Zone and Music Train only; BPM Collection 3 (Pumptris) is added to Arcade channels in Fiesta 2 version 1.50+ Mixes Pumptris Quattro and Pumptris 8bit ver.
Monkey-rang	(MAX)	Pump It Up Fiesta 2	Skill Up Zone only Mixes Arirang and Monkey Fingers
Whimera	(Doin)	Pump It Up Fiesta 2	Skill Up Zone only Mixes Witch Doctor, Extravaganza and Bee (But Chimera is absent since it only mixes Wi-Ex-Doc-Va and Bee part of Bemera.)
Trato X4	(MAX)	Pump It Up Fiesta 2	Skill Up Zone only Trato X4 is the shorter version of Trato De No Trabarme. However, its "Big Metra" line is repeated four times.
Solitary Elise	(Doin)	Pump It Up Fiesta 2	Skill Up Zone only Mixes Solitary 1.5, Sorceress Elise
Turkey Mix	(Doin)	Pump It Up Fiesta 2	Skill Up Zone only Mixes Turkey March -Minimal Tunes- and Turkey March
Beatreme of the Wisp	(Doin)	Pump It Up Fiesta 2	Skill Up Zone only Mixes X-Treme, Vook, Beat of the War 2 and Will o' the Wisp
Pumping Jam	(MAX)	Pump It Up Fiesta 2	Skill Up Zone only Mixes Pumping Jumping and Jam O Beat
4-X	(Doin)	Pump It Up Fiesta 2	Skill Up Zone only 4-X is the longer version of Final Audition Episode 2-X with its choir part repeated four times.
Chicken Doctor	(Doin)	Pump It Up Fiesta 2	Skill Up Zone only Mixes Witch Doctor and Chicken Wing
Cannon X-Tree	(Doin)	Pump It Up Fiesta 2	Skill Up Zone only Mixes Cannon X.1 and X-Tree
DJ. Moon	(Doin)	Pump It Up Fiesta 2	Skill Up Zone only Mixes DJ Otada and Moonlight
KM Pop Mix	(SHK)	Pump It Up Fiesta 2	Skill Up Zone only Mixes Com'back, Digan lo que Digan and Narcisista por Excelencia KM means "Korean" and "Mexican".
Final Danger Sticks	(Doin)	Pump It Up Fiesta 2	Skill Up Zone only Mixes Chopsticks Challenge, Final Audition and Love is a Danger Zone
To.Jam.Fa	(Doin)	Pump It Up Fiesta 2	Skill Up Zone only Mixes Toccata, Jam O Beat and Final Audition 3 U.F.
BPM Collection 2 (Solitaries)	(Doin)	Pump It Up Fiesta 2	Skill Up Zone and Music Train only; BPM Collection 2 (Solitaries) is added to Arcade channels in Fiesta 2 version 1.50+ Mixes Solitary, Solitary 1.5 and Solitary 2
Amadeustreme	(Doin)	Pump It Up Fiesta 2	Skill Up Zone only Mixes X-Treme and Pump Me Amadeus
BPM Collection 1 (Auditions)	(Doin)	Pump It Up Fiesta 2	Skill Up Zone and Music Train only; BPM Collection 1 (Auditions) is added to Arcade channels in Fiesta 2 version 1.50+ Mixes Final Audition, Final Audition 2 and Final Audition 3 U.F
Pumpster Zone 2–1	(Doin)	Pump It Up Fiesta 2	Skill Up Zone only Mixes Pumptris Quattro, Faster Z, Love is a Danger Zone 2 and Final Audition Episode 2-1
Hamera	(Doin)	Pump It Up Fiesta 2	Skill Up Zone only Mixes Dignity and Chimera
Bee-mera	(Doin)	Pump It Up Fiesta 2	Skill Up Zone only Mixes Bee and Chimera, but unlike Bemera, both songs' arrangements are separated as opposed to being merged.
World Pop Mix	(SHK)	Pump It Up Fiesta 2	Skill Up Zone only Mixes Slightly, Another Truth and Energizer
Ladimera	(Doin)	Pump It Up Fiesta 2	Skill Up Zone only Mixes Mr. Larpus, Dignity and Bemera
BPM Collection 4 (etc. Mix)	(Doin)	Pump It Up Fiesta 2	Skill Up Zone and Music Train only; BPM Collection 4 (etc. Mix) is added to Arcade channels in Fiesta 2 version 1.50+ Mixes Final Audition 2, Final Audition 3 U.F and Solitary 1.5
Tepris 테프리스	Doin	Present	Version 1.10+ only Tepris is the remix of Tetris (Game Boy)'s Type A and Tetris (Atari)'s Troika.
Napalm 네이팜	Doin	Present	Version 1.10+ only
Dieciseis 열여섯 살	Nina Pilots	Pump It Up Prime 2	Version 1.10+ only
Let's Go Again, Korea	Brown Eyed Girls & 4Minute	Exclusive	Let's Go Again, Korea (Brown Eyed Girls & 4Minute) is a 2-day promotional song only in Pump It Up Fiesta.
Let's Go Again, Korea	Psy & Kim Jang Hoon	Exclusive	Let's Go Again, Korea (Psy & Kim Jang Hoon) is a 2-day promotional song only in Pump It Up Fiesta.

=== Fiesta EX 2011 (2011) ===
Song title (English/Korean)	Artist	Latest appearance	Notes
Cleaner 클리너	Doin	Present	Cleaner is a sequel to Vacuum from Pump It Up Fiesta.
Interference 인터퍼런스	Doin	Present	
Reality 리얼리티	SHK	Present	
Take Out 테이크 아웃	SHK	Present	Take Out features remixed samples based on the first stage theme of the Capcom game, Ghouls n' Ghosts.
Butterfly 버터플라이	MAX & Rorychesell (SID-Sound)	Present	Butterfly is the first collaboration song by MAX with Rorychesell, the member of SID-Sound.
Overblow 오버블로우	MAX	Present	
We Got 2 Know 위 갓 투 노우	MAX	Present	We Got 2 Know is the second part of "U Got" series of songs by MAX and a sequel to U Got 2 Know from Pump It Up Fiesta.
Magic 매직	Secret	Pump It Up Fiesta 2	
Hot Issue 핫 이슈	4Minute	Pump It Up Fiesta 2	
Magic Girl 마법 소녀	Orange Caramel	Pump It Up Fiesta 2	
Ring Ding Dong	SHINee	Exclusive	International version only Ring Ding Dong is unavailable in the Korean version of Pump It Up Fiesta EX due to licensing issues.
Shock 쇼크	Beast	Pump It Up Fiesta 2	
Last Farewell 마지막 인사	BigBang	Pump It Up Fiesta 2	
Superman 슈퍼맨	Norazo	Pump It Up Prime	
Energy 에너지	Mighty Mouth	Pump It Up Fiesta 2	
Mother 어머니	1TYM	Pump It Up Fiesta 2	Mother is the first new song by 1TYM since Pump It Up Exceed 2.
No.3 넘버쓰리	Bae Chi Gi	Pump It Up Prime	No. 3 is the first new song by Bae Chi Gi since Pump It Up NX2.
Like a Man 남자답게	Outsider	Pump It Up Prime	
Crashday 크래쉬데이	Crash	Pump It Up Prime 2	Crashday is the first new song by Crash since Pump It Up Exceed.
Hungarian Dance V 헝가리 무곡 V	BanYa Production	Present	Hungarian Dance V is the remix of "Hungarian Dances No.5" by Johannes Brahms.
The Devil 마왕	BanYa Production	Present	The Devil is the remix of "In the Hall of the Mountain King" by Edvard Grieg. The Devil is the final song by BanYa Production made before their retirement.
Native 네이티브	SHK	Present	Version 1.30+ only
K-Pop Girl Group RMX 케이팝 걸 그룹 리믹스	Secret/Orange Caramel/4Minute/2NE1	Pump It Up Fiesta 2	Mixes Magic, Magic Girl, Hot Issue and Fire (2NE1).
K-Pop Boy Group RMX	Beast/BigBang/SHINee	Exclusive	Version 1.30+ only International release only K-Pop Boy Group RMX is unavailable in the Korean version of Pump It Up Fiesta EX due to licensing issues. Mixes Shock, Last Farewell and Ring Ding Dong
Vacuum Cleaner 진공 청소기	Doin	Present	Version 1.30+ only Mixes Vacuum and Cleaner
Everybody Got 2 Know 에브리바디 갓 투 노우	MAX	Present	Version 1.20+ only Mixes U Got 2 Know and We Got 2 Know
Pump Classic Remix A	Doin	Pump It Up Fiesta EX	Music Train only in both Fiesta and Fiesta EX Mixes Phantom, Maria, Ugly Dee, Dr. M, Hungarian Dance V, Toccata, Turkey March, Higgledy Piggledy, K.O.A -Alice in Wonderworld-, Sorceress Elise, Bee, Caprice of Otada and Canon-D Full Song Mix
Pump Classic Remix B	Doin	Pump It Up Fiesta EX	Music Train only in both Fiesta and Fiesta EX Mixes Faster Z, Beethoven Virus, Winter, Pump Me Amadeus, DJ Otada, Moonlight, Csikos Post, Get Up!, Chimera and The Devil
Interference (Full Song) 인터퍼런스	Doin	Present	Version 1.40+ only
Magic Girl (Full Song) 마법 소녀	Orange Caramel	Pump It Up Fiesta 2	
Ring Ding Dong (Full Song)	SHINee	Exclusive	Version 1.30+ only International version only Ring Ding Dong (Full Song) is unavailable in the Korean version of Pump It Up Fiesta EX.
Shock (Full Song) 쇼크	Beast	Pump It Up Fiesta 2	
Energy (Full Song) 에너지	Mighty Mouth	Pump It Up Fiesta 2	
Like a Man (Full Song) 남자답게	Outsider	Pump It Up Prime	
No.3 (Full Song) 넘버쓰리	Bae Chi Gi	Pump It Up Prime	
Crashday (Full Song) 크래쉬데이	Crash	Pump It Up Prime 2	
Hot Issue (Full Song) 핫 이슈	4Minute	Pump It Up Fiesta 2	Version 1.30+ only
Pump Classic Full Mix	Doin	None	Cancelled song Pump Classic Full Mix is the medley of Pump Classic Remix A and Pump Classic Remix B, but removed Faster Z from Pump Classic Remix B. Pump Classic Full Mix was removed in the next version due to its fatal bug. Playing the song will end up crashing the system, restarting the game.
Trotpris 트롯프리스	Doin	Present	Trotpris is the shorter version of Tepris from Pump It Up Fiesta.
Cleaner (Shortcut) 클리너	Doin	Present	
Take Out (Shortcut) 테이크 아웃	SHK	Present	
Overblow (Shortcut) 오버블로우	MAX	Present	
X-Rave (Shortcut) 엑스 레이브	DM Ashura	Present	
Hot Issue (Alternate ver.) 핫 이슈	4Minute	Pump It Up Fiesta 2	Mission Zone only in both Fiesta EX and Fiesta 2
Night Duty 야근	A.V	Present	Mission Zone only in both Fiesta EX and Fiesta 2 Added to Arcade Mode in Infinity version 1.10+ Night Duty is made playable in Pump It Up XX Version 2.06.0 since its removal on Pump It Up Prime. It has remained unplayable on arcade channels for over ten years.
Pavane 파반느	V.A	Present	Mission Zone only; Version 1.30+ only in Arcade channels Pavane is the remix of "Pavane in F-sharp minor, op.50" by Gabriel Fauré.
Pine Nut 잣	Doin	Present	Mission Zone only; Version 1.50+ only in Arcade channels
ASDF ㅁㄴㅇㄹ	Doin	Present	Mission Zone only; Version 1.50+ only in Arcade channels
Last Farewell (Alternate ver.) 마지막 인사	BigBang	Pump It Up Fiesta 2	Mission Zone only in both Fiesta EX and Fiesta 2
Says 말씀	Doin	Pump It Up Infinity	Mission Zone only in both Fiesta EX and Fiesta 2 Added to Arcade Mode in Infinity version 1.10+
Energy (Alternate ver.) 에너지	Mighty Mouth	Pump It Up Fiesta 2	Mission Zone only in both Fiesta EX and Fiesta 2
Jonathan's Dream 조나단의 꿈	MAX & Seorryang (SID-Sound)	Present	Version 1.50+ only Jonathan's Dream is the second collaboration by MAX with another SID-Sound member, Seorryang.

=== Fiesta 2 2013 (2012) ===
Song title (English/Korean)	Artist	Latest appearance	Notes
FFF (Flew Far Faster) 에프 에프 에프	Doin	Present	
Unique 유니크	SHK	Present	
Accident 엑시던트	MAX	Present	
D 디	MAX	Present	D is the remix of "Symphony No. 5" by Ludwig van Beethoven. D is the first classical crossover song by MAX.
U Got Me Rocking 유 갓 미 락킹	MAX	Present	U Got Me Rocking is the third part of "U Got" series of songs by MAX and a sequel to We Got 2 Know from Pump It Up Fiesta EX.
Lucid (PIU Edit) 루시드 (PIU Edit)	Yak_Won	Present	Lucid (PIU Edit) is the arranged version of Yak_Won's song, "Lucid" from EZ2DJ 7th TraX: Resistance version 1.50.
Nobody 노바디	Wonder Girls	Pump It Up Prime	Nobody is the first new song by Wonder Girls since Pump It Up NX2 Korean version.
Bad Girl Good Girl 배드 걸 굿 걸	Miss A	Pump It Up Prime	
Step 스텝	Kara	Pump It Up Prime	
I Am the Best 내가 제일 잘 나가	2NE1	Pump It Up Prime	
Can't Nobody 캔노바디	2NE1	Pump It Up Prime	
Shanghai Romance 샹하이 로맨스	Orange Caramel	Pump It Up Prime	
Fantastic Baby 판타스틱 베이비	BigBang	Pump It Up Prime	
Lies 거짓말	BigBang	Pump It Up Prime	
Heartbreaker 하트 브레이커	G-Dragon	Pump It Up Prime	
Hands Up (East4A Mix) 핸즈 업 (East4A 믹스)	2PM	Exclusive	
Be Mine 내꺼하자	Infinite	Pump It Up Prime	
Crayon 크레용	G-Dragon	Pump It Up Prime	Version 1.10+ only
Mackerel 고등어	Norazo	Pump It Up Prime	Mackerel's structure is very similar to Superman from Pump It Up Fiesta EX.
Two Guys 두마리	Bae Chi Gi	Pump It Up Prime	
Danza Kuduro	Don Omar feat. Lucenzo	Pump It Up Prime	Latin American version only in Fiesta 2 and Prime
Rabiosa	Shakira feat. Pitbull	Pump It Up Prime	Latin American version only in Fiesta 2 and Prime
Lovumba	Daddy Yankee	Pump It Up Prime	Latin American version only in Fiesta 2 and Prime
One, Two, Three, Go! 원 투 쓰리 고!	Belanova	Pump It Up Prime	
Los Malaventurados No Lloran 불행한 사람들은 울지 않는다	Pxndx	Pump It Up Prime	Los Malaventurados No Lloran is the only licensed song in Pump It Up Fiesta 2 without a music video due to its explicit suicidal scenes, deemed inappropriate to young players.
Sik Asik 식 아식	Ayu Ting Ting	Pump It Up Prime 2	
Online 온라인	Saykoji	Pump It Up Prime 2	
Dam 담	Ben Chalatit	Pump It Up Prime 2	
Sugar Eyes 슈가 아이즈	Sugar Eyes	Pump It Up Prime 2	
Log-in 로그인	SHK	Present	Version 1.40+ only
Windmill 윈드밀	Yak_Won	Present	Version 1.40+ only
Follow Me 팔로우 미	SHK	Present	Version 1.60+ only
Yeo rae a 여래아	SID-Sound	Present	Version 1.60+ only Yeo rae a is the first commissioned song by SID-Sound, marking it as "PIU Original" instead of "World Music" license.
Mental Rider 멘탈 라이더	SQUAR	Present	Mission Zone only; Version 1.50+ only in Arcade channels
BIG to the BANG 빅 투 더 뱅	BigBang & MAX	Pump It Up Prime	Mixes Fantastic Baby, Lie and Last Farewell
Super Mackerel 슈퍼 고등어	Norazo & MAX	Pump It Up Prime	Mixes Superman and Mackerel Super Mackerel is the final song of K-Pop Remix series.
Infinity RMX 인피니티 리믹스	SynthWulf & MAX	Present	Mixes Passacaglia and Hypnosis (SynthWulf Mix)
What Are You Doin? 와라유도인?	Doin & MAX	Present	Mixes Says, Vacuum, Interference, ASDF, Tepris, Pine Nut, Cleaner and FFF
Step (Full Song) 스텝	Kara	Pump It Up Prime	
I Am the Best (Full Song) 내가 제일 잘 나가	2NE1	Pump It Up Prime	
Shanghai Romance (Full Song) 샹하이 로맨스	Orange Caramel	Pump It Up Prime	
Fantastic Baby (Full Song) 판타스틱 베이비	BigBang	Pump It Up Prime	
Can't Nobody (Full Song) 캔노바디	2NE1	Pump It Up Prime	Version 1.60+ only
Heartbreaker (Full Song) 하트 브레이커	G-Dragon	Pump It Up Prime	Version 1.60+ only
Mackerel (Full Song) 고등어	Norazo	None	Cancelled song
Crayon (Full Song) 크레용	G-Dragon	None	Cancelled song
Danza Kuduro (Full Song)	Don Omar feat. Lucenzo	None	Cancelled song
Pop The Track (Shortcut) 팝 더 트랙	J-Mi & Midi-D Ft. Hanna Stockzell	Present	
Passacaglia (Shortcut) 파사칼리아	SynthWulf	Present	
Ignis Fatuus (DM Ashura Mix) (Shortcut) 이그니스 패터스 (DM Ashura 믹스)	DM Ashura	Present	
FFF (Flew Far Faster) (Shortcut) 에프 에프 에프	Doin	Present	
Unique (Shortcut) 유니크	SHK	Present	
U Got Me Rocking (Shortcut) 유 갓 미 락킹	MAX	Present	
Right Now	Psy	None	Cancelled song

=== Prime 2015 (2014) ===
Song title (English/Japanese/Korean)	Artist	Latest appearance	Notes
Nemesis 네메시스	M2U	Present	
Katkoi 캇코이	M2U	Present	Version 1.07.0+ only Prime Japanese Edition version 1.03.0+ only
Latino Virus 라티노 바이러스	Warak	Present	Latino Virus is a remix of "Pathétique" 1st Movement and 3rd Movement by Ludwig van Beethoven. Latino Virus is a second classical remix song based on Ludwig van Beethoven's "Pathétique" 3rd Movement in the series.
Elysium 엘리시움	Warak	Present	Version 1.13.0+ only Prime Japanese Edition version 1.09.0+ only
Yog Sothoth 요그 소토스	Nato	Present	Yog Sothoth is the first part of Nato's H. P. Lovecraft's Outer God series of songs.
Silhouette Effect 실루엣 이펙트	Nato	Present	Version 1.08.0+ only Prime Japanese Edition version 1.04.0+ only Silhouette Effect can be found in Pump It Up Prime intro, but its default song was not added until international release of Prime version 1.08.0 and Prime Japanese Edition version 1.04.0.
Chinese Restaurant 차이니즈 레스토랑	Memme	Present	
Avalanche 아발란치	Memme	Present	Version 1.04.0+ only Prime Japanese Edition version 1.04.0+ only Avalance is a remix of Winter by BanYa from Pump It Up Rebirth.
Force of Ra 포스 오브 라	Memme	Present	Version 1.16.0+ only Prime Japanese Edition version 1.12.0+ only
Requiem 레퀴엠	MAX	Present	Requiem is a remix of "Dies irae" requiem by Giuseppe Verdi.
U Got Me Crazy 유 갓 미 크레이지	MAX	Present	Version 1.05.0+ only Prime Japanese Edition version 1.02.0+ only U Got Me Crazy is the fourth and final part of "U Got" series of songs by MAX.
B2	MAX	Present	Version 1.07.0+ only Prime Japanese Edition version 1.03.0+ only B2's original title was "BLEED 2", the sequel to "BLEED" from Sabin Sound Star and EZ2DJ 7th TraX: Bonus Edition, but was later changed to "B2" due to copyright claim by WG Publishing. (Note: The rights to Sabin Sound Star are currently owned by Japanese mobile game developer WG Publishing, Inc., which had obtained the rights of 3S Entertainment.)
Meteorize 메테오라이즈	Paul Bazooka	Present	
Mad5cience 매드 사이언스	Paul Bazooka	Present	Version 1.15.0+ only Prime Japanese Edition version 1.11.0+ only
Hestia 헤스티아	Gentle Stick	Present	Version 1.01.0+ only (default song in Prime Japanese Edition)
Amphitryon 암피트리온	Gentle Stick	Present	Version 1.17.0 + only Prime Japanese Edition version 1.13.0+ only
Leakage Voltage 리키지 볼티지	Doin	Present	
Removable Disk0 리무버블 디스코	Doin	Present	Version 1.18.0+ only Prime Japanese Edition version 1.14.0+ only
Super Fantasy 슈퍼 판타지	SHK	Present	Remix of "Fantaisie-Impromptu" by Frédéric Chopin Super Fantasy is a first classical remix song by SHK composed for Pump It Up series.
Violet Perfume 바이올렛 퍼퓸	SHK	Present	Version 1.12.0+ only Prime Japanese Edition version 1.08.0+ only
Red Swan 레드 스완	Yahpp	Present	First new song by Yahpp since Pump It Up Fiesta Red Swan is a remix of Ugly Dee from Pump It Up NX
Hyacinth 히아신스	Yahpp	Present	Version 1.10.0+ only Prime Japanese Edition version 1.06.0+ only Hyacinth is a first new song by Yahpp since Pump It Up Prime's initial version release, at 9-versions gap
Blaze Emotion (Band Version) 블레이즈 이모션 (Band Version)	Yahpp	Present	Version 1.17.0+ only Prime Japanese Edition version 1.13.0+ only Blaze Emotion (Band Version) is the piano and non-vocal version of Blaze Emotion from Pump It Up NXA. Blaze Emotion (Band Version) is the final song by Yahpp in the series.
1950	SLAM	Present	Version 1.07.0+ only Prime Japanese Edition version 1.08.0+ only
Sugar Conspiracy Theory 설탕음모론	MAX	Present	Version 1.06.0+ only (default song in Prime Japanese Edition)
Allegro Piu Mosso 알레그로 피유 모쏘	DM Ashura	Present	Allegro Piu Mosso is a second part of "Allegro" series of songs by DM Ashura and a sequel to Allegro Con Fuoco from Pump It Up Pro 2 and Pump It Up Fiesta EX
Annihilator Method 어나이얼레이터 메소드	DM Ashura	Present	Version 1.08.0+ only Prime Japanese Edition version 1.04.0+ only
Move That Body! 무브 댓 바디!	DM Ashura feat. Skizzo & Hanna	Present	Version 1.06.0+ only (default song in Prime Japanese Edition)
Rock The House 락 더 하우스	Matduke	Present	
Scorpion King 스콜피온 킹	r300k	Present	Version 1.12.0+ only Prime Japanese Edition version 1.08.0+ only
Point Zero One 포인트 제로 원	SynthWulf	Present	Version 1.13.0+ only Prime Japanese Edition version 1.09.0+ only
Red Snow 레드 스노우	Cashew	Present	Version 1.15.0+ only Prime Japanese Edition version 1.11.0+ only
Campanella 캄파넬라	Cashew	Present	Version 1.19.0+ only Prime Japanese Edition version 1.15.0+ only Campanella is a remix of "La campanella" by Franz Liszt.
You Again My Love 유 어게인 마이 러브	CYO Style & Henohenomoheji	Present	Version 1.21.0+ only Prime Japanese Edition version 1.17.0+ only
Robot Battle 로봇 배틀	CYO Style	Present	
Bar Bar Bar 빠빠빠	Crayon Pop	Pump It Up Prime 2	
On and On 다칠 준비가 돼 있어	VIXX	Pump It Up Prime 2	Version 1.02.0+ only (default song in Prime Japanese Edition)
Elvis 엘비스	AOA	Pump It Up Prime 2	
Very Good 베리 굿	Block B	Pump It Up Prime 2	Version 1.04.0+ only (default song in Prime Japanese Edition) Very Good can be found in Pump It Up Prime intro, but its default song was not added until international release of Prime version 1.04.0.
I'm Sorry 아임 쏘리	CNBLUE	Pump It Up Prime 2	
Pandora 판도라	Kara	Pump It Up Prime 2	
Venus 비너스	Shinhwa	Pump It Up Prime 2	Version 1.05.0+ only Prime Japanese Edition version 1.02.0+ only
Hate, Don't Hate! 있기 없기	Dal Shabet	Pump It Up Prime 2	
Supermagic 슈퍼매직	Supreme Team	Pump It Up Prime 2	
Sugar Free 슈가 프리	T-ara	Pump It Up Prime 2	
Her 헐	Block B	Pump It Up Prime 2	
NoNoNo 노노노	Apink	Pump It Up Prime 2	
Loner 외톨이	Outsider	Pump It Up Prime 2	Loner (Outsider) is a first new song by Outsider since Pump It Up Fiesta EX, despite his album "Maestro" being released in 2009.
Flying Duck 오리날다	Cherry Filter	Pump It Up Prime 2	
Ineffective Boss Without Power 치이고 박히고 무능상사	Norazo	Pump It Up Prime 2	Version 1.01.0+ only (default song in Prime Japanese Edition) Ineffective Boss Without Power is different lyrics, arranged version of Norazo's song, "Infinite Boss (무한상사)" from PNIX Games' mobile game Office Rumble (치고박고 무한상사).
One 원	Epik High	Pump It Up Prime 2	One is a first new song by Epik High since Pump It Up NX, despite their album "Pieces, Part One" being released in 2008.
Selfishness 셀피쉬니스	SID-Sound	Present	Version 1.03.0+ only Prime Japanese Edition version 1.02.0+ only
Cosmical Rhythm 코스미컬 리듬	SID-Sound	Present	
Dolly Kiss 돌리 키스	SID-Sound	Present	Version 1.07.0+ only Prime Japanese Edition version 1.03.0+ only
Matador 마타도르	Cranky	Present	
Milky Way Galaxy 밀키 웨이 갤럭시	3R2	Present	Version 1.03.0+ only Prime Japanese Edition version 1.04.0+ only
Feel My Happiness 필 마이 해피니스	3R2	Present	Version 1.19.0+ only Prime Japanese Edition version 1.15.0+ only
Ragnarok 라그나로크	SynthWulf	Present	
Achluoias 아클루오이아스	D_AAN	Present	Version 1.02.0+ only (default song in Prime Japanese Edition)
Karyawisata 꺄랴위사따	Vesuvia x REDSHIFT	Present	
video out c 비디오 아웃 씨	Vospi	Present	Version 1.11.0+ only Prime Japanese Edition version 1.07.0+ only
Limbo 림보	Daddy Yankee	Pump It Up Prime 2	Latin American version only in Prime and Prime 2
Melodia 멜로디아	Lylloo feat. Egas	Pump It Up Prime 2	Latin American version only in Prime and Prime 2
Que Viva La Vida 께 비바 라 비다	Wisin ft. Michel Telo	Pump It Up Prime 2	Latin American version only in Prime and Prime 2
Across the Ocean 어크로스 디 오션	Zircon	Pump It Up Prime 2	Version 1.20.0+ only Prime Japanese Edition version 1.16.0+ only
Stardust Overdrive 스타더스트 오버드라이브	typeMARS	Present	Version 1.09.0+ only Prime Japanese Edition version 1.05.0+ only
Reminiscence 레미니센스	MAX	Present	Version 1.10.0+ only Prime Japanese Edition version 1.06.0+ only Reminiscence is the arranged version of "Magic Shop of Raspberry (unused track)" from dōjin video game Touhou Gensoukyou: Lotus Land Story.
Moment Day 모멘트 데이	MAX	Present	Version 1.16.0+ only Prime Japanese Edition version 1.12.0+ only Moment Day is the arranged version of "Desire Drive" from dōjin video game Touhou Shinreibyou: Ten Desires.
Amai Yuuwaku Dangerous 甘い誘惑デインジャラス 아마이 유우와쿠 데인저러스	Bakusute Sotokanda Icchome (Note: "バクステ外神田一丁目" in Japanese. In the Korean versions' song select screen, "Bakusute Sotokanda Icchome" is displayed as "바쿠스테 소토칸다 잇쵸메" in Korean.)	Present	Prime Japanese Edition version 1.06.0+ only Version 1.11.0+ only in international release of Pump It Up Prime. Amai Yuuwaku Dangerous is the first mainstream J-Pop ("J-Music" in Pump It Up's terminology) licensed song in the series. Due to the removal of the J-music category on Pump It Up Phoenix 2, Amai Yuuwaku Dangerous and other present J-music songs will now be under the World Music category from now on.
Yoropiku Pikuyoro! ヨロピク ピクヨロ! 요로피쿠 피쿠요로!	Bakusute Sotokanda Icchome	Present	Version 1.10.0+ only Prime Japanese Edition version 1.07.0+ only Due to the removal of the J-music category on Pump It Up Phoenix 2, Yoropiku Pikuyoro! and other present J-music songs will now be under the World Music category from now on.
Imprinting 임프린팅	Sakuzyo	Present	Prime Japanese Edition version 1.01.0+ only Version 1.10.0+ only in international release of Pump It Up Prime. Imprinting's soundbite "I Feel You" was taken from another Sakuzyo song, "Laplace". Due to the removal of the J-music category on Pump It Up Phoenix 2, Imprinting and other present J-music songs will now be under the World Music category from now on.
Sudden Romance (PIU Edit) 서든 로맨스 (PIU Edit)	void	Present	Prime Japanese Edition version 1.01.0+ only Added to international release in Prime 2 Due to the removal of the J-music category on Pump It Up Phoenix 2, Sudden Romance (PIU Edit) and other present J-music songs will now be under the World Music category from now on.
Mitotsudaira 미토츠다이라	ETIA.	Present	Prime Japanese Edition version 1.01.0+ only Version 1.20.0+ only in international release of Pump It Up Prime. Due to the removal of the J-music category on Pump It Up Phoenix 2, Mitotsudaira and other present J-music songs will now be under the World Music category from now on.
Smile Diary 스마일 다이어리	you	Present	Prime Japanese Edition version 1.01.0+ only Version 1.19.0+ only in international release of Pump It Up Prime. Due to the removal of the J-music category on Pump It Up Phoenix 2, Smile Diary and other present J-music songs will now be under the World Music category from now on.
Bad Apple!! feat. Nomico 배드 애플!! feat. Nomico	Masayoshi Minoshima	Present	Prime Japanese Edition version 1.01.0+ only (replaced to modified song data in Prime Japanese Edition version 1.02.0) Version 1.09.0+ only in international release of Pump It Up Prime. Bad Apple!! feat. Nomico is the arranged version of "Bad Apple!!" from dōjin video game Touhou Gensoukyou: Lotus Land Story. Bad Apple!! feat. Nomico is added to the international release of Pump It Up Prime version 1.09.0, marking it as the first song to be added in international release since Tell Me (Wonder Girls). Bad Apple!! feat. Nomico, along with Four Seasons of Loneliness verβ feat. Sariyajin are the first songs to be in J-music category exclusively. Due to the removal of the J-music category on Pump It Up Phoenix 2, Bad Apple!! feat. Nomico and other present J-music songs will now be under the World Music category from now on.
Creed -1st Desire- (Note: "信仰 -1st Desire- feat. 小田ユウ" (Creed -1st Desire- feat. Yu Oda) in titlecard.) 信仰 -1st Desire- 신앙 -1st Desire-	TatshMusicCircle	Pump It Up XX	Prime Japanese Edition version 1.02.0+ only Version 1.13.0+ only in international release of Pump It Up Prime. Creed -1st Desire- is the arranged version of "Shoutoku Legend: True Administrator" from dōjin video game Touhou Shinreibyou: Ten Desires.
Sora no Shirabe 空の調べ 소라 노 시라베	TatshMusicCircle	Pump It Up XX	Prime Japanese Edition version 1.04.0+ only Version 1.18.0+ only in international release of Pump It Up Prime.
Four Seasons of Loneliness verβ feat. Sariyajin FOUR SEASONS OF LONELINESS verβ feat. サリヤ人 포 시즌스 오브 론리네스 verβ feat. Sariyajin	TatshMusicCircle	Pump It Up XX	Prime Japanese Edition version 1.05.0+ only Version 1.09.0+ only in international release of Pump It Up Prime. Four Seasons of Loneliness verβ feat. Sariyajin is the arranged version of "Emotional Skyscraper: Cosmic Mind" from dōjin video game Touhou Seirensen: Undefined Fantastic Object. (Also, this song is the remixed version of TatshMusicCircle's song, "Four Seasons of Loneliness".) Four Seasons of Loneliness verβ feat. Sariyajin is the first J-Music song to be added in both international and Japanese versions simultaneously.
Ai, Yurete... 哀、揺れて・・・ 아이 유레테...	TatshMusicCircle	Pump It Up XX	Prime Japanese Edition version 1.05.0+ only Added to international release in Prime 2 Ai, Yurete... is the arranged version of "Youkai Modern Colony" from dōjin video game Double Spoiler: Touhou Bunkachou.
Setsuna Trip セツナトリップ 세츠나 트립	Last Note.	Pump It Up XX	Prime Japanese Edition version 1.05.0+ only Version 1.12.0+ only in international release of Pump It Up Prime.
Trashy Innocence 我楽多イノセンス 잡동사니 이노센스	Last Note.	Pump It Up XX	Prime Japanese Edition version 1.05.0+ only Version 1.14.0+ only in international release of Pump It Up Prime.
Ren'ai Yuusha 恋愛勇者 연애용자	Last Note.	Pump It Up XX	Prime Japanese Edition version 1.06.0+ only Version 1.14.0+ only in international release of Pump It Up Prime.
After School Stride 放課後ストライド 방과후 스트라이드	Last Note.	Pump It Up XX	Prime Japanese Edition version 1.06.0+ only Version 1.16.0+ only in international release of Pump It Up Prime.
Prime 프라임	Tatsh	Present	Prime Japanese Edition version 1.06.0+ only Version 1.15.0+ only in international release of Pump It Up Prime. Prime (song) is the first original song by Tatsuya Shimizu in the series without using "TatshMusicCircle" alias, but included in J-Music category. Due to the removal of the J-music category on Pump It Up Phoenix 2, Prime (song) and other present J-music songs will now be under the World Music category from now on.
Bad ∞ End ∞ Night 배드 ∞ 엔드 ∞ 나이트	Hitoshizuku P X YamaΔ (Note: "ひとしずくP X やま△" in Japanese. In the Korean versions' song select screen, "Hitoshizuku P X YamaΔ" is displayed as "히토시즈쿠P X 야마△" in Korean.)	Pump It Up XX	Version 1.11.0+ only Prime Japanese Edition version 1.07.0+ only
Queen Of The Red 퀸 오브 더 레드	ETIA.	Present	Version 1.12.0+ only Prime Japanese Edition version 1.08.0+ only Due to the removal of the J-music category on Pump It Up Phoenix 2, Queen Of The Red and other present J-music songs will now be under the World Music category from now on.
Idealized Romance 아이디얼라이즈드 로맨스	void	Present	Prime Japanese Edition version 1.09.0+ only Version 1.16.0+ only in international release of Pump It Up Prime. Due to the removal of the J-music category on Pump It Up Phoenix 2, Idealized Romance and other present J-music songs will now be under the World Music category from now on.
Just Hold On (To All Fighters) 저스트 홀드 온 (To All Fighters)	void	Present	Version 1.14.0+ only Prime Japanese Edition version 1.10.0+ only Due to the removal of the J-music category on Pump It Up Phoenix 2, Just Hold On (To All Fighters) and other present J-music songs will now be under the World Music category from now on.
Unlock 언락	Daichi Miura (Cover)	Pump It Up Prime 2	Prime Japanese Edition version 1.11.0+ only Japanese version only in Prime 2
Heavy Rotation ヘビーローテーション 헤비 로테이션	AKB48 (Cover)	Pump It Up Prime 2	Prime Japanese Edition version 1.11.0+ only Japanese version only in Prime 2
Break It Down 브레이크 잇 다운	MAZO	Present	Version 1.15.0+ only Prime Japanese Edition version 1.11.0+ only
Hypercube 하이퍼큐브	MAX	Present	Version 1.12.0+ only Prime Japanese Edition version 1.08.0+ only
Like Me 라이크 미	SHK	Present	Version 1.21.0+ only Prime Japanese Edition version 1.17.0+ only Like Me is a sequel to Follow Me from Pump It Up Fiesta 2.
Beethoven Influenza 베토벤 인플루엔자	BanYa & Warak	Present	Mixes Beethoven Virus and Latino Virus
Avalanquiem 아발란퀴엠	MAX & Memme	Present	Version 1.04.0+ only Prime Japanese Edition version 1.06.0+ only Mixes Avalanche and Requiem
PARADOXX 패러독스	SLAM & Nato	Present	Version 1.18.0+ only Prime Japanese Edition version 1.14.0+ only Mixes 1950 and Yog Sothoth
Bar Bar Bar (Full Song) 빠빠빠	Crayon Pop	Pump It Up Prime 2	
Sugar Free (Full Song) 슈가 프리	T-ara	Pump It Up Prime 2	Version 1.01.0+ only (default song in Prime Japanese Edition)
NoNoNo (Full Song) 노노노	Apink	Pump It Up Prime 2	Version 1.12.0+ only Prime Japanese Edition version 1.08.0+ only
Move That Body! (Full Song) 무브 댓 바디!	DM Ashura feat. Skizzo & Hanna	Present	Version 1.11.0+ only Prime Japanese Edition version 1.07.0+ only Move That Body! (Full Song) is used for official Pump It Up Prime's first contest, UCS Contest, along with Canon-D and The Revolution.
Pandora (Full Song) 판도라	Kara	Pump It Up Prime 2	Version 1.14.0+ only Prime Japanese Edition version 1.10.0+ only
Four Seasons of Loneliness verβ feat. Sariyajin (Full Song) FOUR SEASONS OF LONELINESS verβ feat. サリヤ人 포 시즌스 오브 론리네스 verβ feat. Sariyajin	TatshMusicCircle	Pump It Up XX	Version 1.09.0+ only Prime Japanese Edition version 1.05.0+ only
Bad Apple!! feat. Nomico (Full Song) 배드 애플!! feat. Nomico	Masayoshi Minoshima	Present	Version 1.09.0+ only Prime Japanese Edition version 1.05.0+ only Due to the removal of the J-music category on Pump It Up Phoenix 2, Bad Apple!! feat. Nomico (Full Song) and other present J-music songs will now be under the World Music category from now on.
Creed -1st Desire- (Full Song) 信仰 -1st Desire- 신앙 -1st Desire-	TatshMusicCircle	Pump It Up XX	Version 1.13.0+ only Prime Japanese Edition version 1.09.0+ only
Super Fantasy (Shortcut) 슈퍼 판타지	SHK	Present	Version 1.10.0+ only Prime Japanese Edition version 1.06.0+ only
Yog Sothoth (Shortcut) 요그 소토스	Nato	Present	
Silhouette Effect (Shortcut) 실루엣 이펙트	Nato	Present	Version 1.08.0+ only Prime Japanese Edition version 1.04.0+ only
Selfishness (Shortcut) 셀피쉬니스	SID-Sound	Present	Version 1.03.0+ only Prime Japanese Edition version 1.02.0+ only
Rock The House (Shortcut) 락 더 하우스	Matduke	Present	
Move That Body! (Shortcut) 무브 댓 바디!	DM Ashura feat. Skizzo & Hanna	Present	Version 1.06.0+ only (default song in Prime Japanese Edition)
PRIME Opening 프라임 오프닝	MAX	Present	Version 1.02.0+ only Prime Japanese Edition version 1.02.0+ only
Stardust Overdrive (Shortcut) 스타더스트 오버드라이브	typeMARS	Present	Version 1.09.0+ only (replaced to modified song data in version 1.10.0) Prime Japanese Edition version 1.05.0+ only
Heavy Rotation (Shortcut) ヘビーローテーション 헤비 로테이션	AKB48 (Cover)	Pump It Up Prime 2	Prime Japanese Edition version 1.12.0+ only Japanese version only in Prime 2

=== Prime 2 2017 (2016) ===
Song title (English/Korean)	Artist	Latest appearance	Notes
Last Rebirth 라스트 리버스	SHK	Present	
Super Capriccio 슈퍼 카프리시오	SHK	Present	Version 2.00.0+ only Super Capriccio is a remix of Caprice of Otada by BanYa Production from Pump It Up NX2.
Hellfire 헬파이어	Memme	Present	Hellfire is a remix of the third movement (Presto) of Antonio Vivaldi's "Summer" from "The Four Seasons".
Tritium 트리튬	Memme	Present	Version 2.03.0+ only Tritium is a sequel to Uranium from O2Jam and Pump It Up XX.
Cross Over 크로스 오버	HyuN feat. LyuU	Present	Version 2.04.0+ only Cross Over is the second part of HyuN's "Cross" series of songs and a sequel to Cross Soul.
God Mode feat. Skizzo 갓 모드 feat. Skizzo	Nato	Present	
Shub Niggurath 슈브 니구라스	Nato	Present	Version 1.06.0+ only Shub Niggurath is the second part of Nato's H. P. Lovecraft's Outer God series of songs and a sequel to Yog Sothoth from Pump It Up Prime.
Further 퍼더	Doin	Present	Further (Doin) is a sequel to Flew Far Faster from Pump It Up Fiesta 2.
The Quick Brown Fox Jumps Over The Lazy Dog 다람쥐 헌 쳇바퀴에 타고파	Doin	Present	Version 2.05.0+ only
Silver Beat feat. Chisa Uezono 실버 비트 feat. Chisa Uezono	Tatsh	Present	Version 2.03.0+ only
Bring Back the Beat 브링 백 더 비트	Lunatic Sounds	Present	
Break Out 브레이크 아웃	Lunatic Sounds	Present	Version 2.05.0+ only Break Out is a sequel to Infinity (song).
Sarabande 사라반드	MAX	Present	Sarabande is a remix of the fourth movement (Sarabande) of George Frideric Handel's "Keyboard suite in D minor (HWV 437)".
Kasou Shinja 가장신자	MAX	Present	Version 1.02.0+ only Kasou Shinja is the arranged version of "Forbidden Magic" from dōjin video game Touhou Kaikidan: Mystic Square.
Overblow 2 오버블로우 2	MAX	Present	Version 1.07.0+ only Overblow 2 is a sequel to Overblow from Pump It Up Fiesta EX.
Passing Rider 패싱 라이더	mzet:-P	Present	Version 2.03.0+ only
Arcana Force 아르카나 포스	mzet:-P	Present	
Allegro Furioso 알레그로 퓨리오소	DM Ashura	Present	Version 1.04.0+ only Allegro Furioso is the third part of "Allegro" series of songs by DM Ashura after Allegro Piu Mosso in Pump It Up Prime and Allegro Con Fuoco in Pump It Up Pro 2 and Fiesta EX.
Anguished Unmaking 앵귀시드 언메이킹	void	Present	Version 2.00.0+ only
Utsushiyo no Kaze feat. Kana 우츠시요 노 카제 feat. Kana	void	Present	Version 1.05.0+ only Utsushiyo no Kaze feat. Kana is the first J-Music song made for Pump It Up Prime 2 as PIU Original.
Hey U 헤이 유	MAZO	Present	Version 1.07.0+ only
Twist of Fate (feat. Ruriling) 트위스트 오브 페이트 (feat. 루리링)	Jehezukiel	Present	Version 2.00.0+ only Twist of Fate (feat. Ruriling) is the 5th place song of the 1st Pump It Up Contents Creation Contest. Twist of Fate (feat. Ruriling) is the direct sequel to Fires of Destiny.
HTTP	Quree	Present	Version 2.00.0+ only HTTP is the 4th place song of the 1st Pump It Up Contents Creation Contest.
Up & Up (Produced by AWAL) 업 앤 업 (Produced by AWAL)	Skizzo	Present	Version 2.02.0+ only Up & Up is the 3rd place song of the 1st Pump It Up Contents Creation Contest.
Travel to Future 트래블 투 퓨처	Neutral Moon	Present	Version 2.02.0+ only Travel to Future is the 2nd place song of the 1st Pump It Up Contents Creation Contest.
Rave 'til the Earth's End 레이브 언틸 디 어스 엔드	5argon	Present	Version 2.01.0+ only Rave 'til the Earth's End is the 1st place song of the 1st Pump It Up Contents Creation Contest.
Awakening 어웨이크닝	typeMARS	Present	Version 2.03.0+ only
Escape 이스케이프	D_AAN	Present	Version 2.05.0+ only
Waltz of Doge 왈츠 오브 도지	Cashew	Present	Version 2.04.0+ only Waltz of Doge is a remix of "Waltz in D-flat major, Op. 64, No. 1, Valse du petit chien" by Frédéric Chopin.
Bang Bang Bang 뱅뱅뱅	BigBang	Exclusive	International version only Bang Bang Bang is unavailable in the Japanese version of Pump It Up Prime 2. Bang Bang Bang is the first new song by BigBang since Pump It Up Fiesta 2.
Me Gustas Tu 오늘부터 우리는	GFriend	Exclusive	Me Gustas Tu is the remix of Sergei Rachmaninoff's "Symphony No. 2, Mvt. 3".
Rhythm Ta 리듬 타	iKon	Exclusive	International version only Rhythm Ta is unavailable in the Japanese version of Pump It Up Prime 2.
Chase Me 체이스 미	Dreamcatcher	Present	Version 1.02.0+ only
Pick Me 픽 미	Produce 101	Exclusive	
Jackpot 잭팟	Block B	Exclusive	
Gotta Be You 너 아님 안돼	2NE1	Exclusive	Version 1.08.0+ only International version only Gotta Be You is unavailable in the Japanese version of Pump It Up Prime 2. Gotta Be You is the first new song by 2NE1 since Pump It Up Fiesta 2, although 2NE1 disbanded in early 2016 and the song was composed in 2014. Gotta Be You is the final song by 2NE1 in the series.
Boombayah 붐바야	Blackpink	Exclusive	International version only Boombayah is unavailable in the Japanese version of Pump It Up Prime 2.
Sober 맨정신	BigBang	Exclusive	Version 1.06.0+ only International version only Sober is unavailable in the Japanese version of Pump It Up Prime 2. Sober is the final song by BigBang in the series.
Up & Down 위아래	EXID	Exclusive	
Good Night 굿 나이트	Dreamcatcher	Present	Version 1.04.0+ only
You're the Best 넌 is 뭔들	Mamamoo	Exclusive	
Number Nine 넘버나인	T-ara	Exclusive	
Acquaintance 주변인	Outsider	Exclusive	
Energetic 에너제틱	Wanna One	Pump It Up XX	Version 2.00.0+ only
Beautiful 뷰티플	Wanna One	Pump It Up XX	Version 2.00.0+ only
Pick Me 나야 나	Produce 101 Season 2	Pump It Up XX	Version 2.01.0+ only Both Pick Me (Produce 101 Season 2) and Pick Me (Produce 101) are second time both male and female versions of a particular song are included in Pump It Up series since Let's Go Again, Korea! (Psy and Kim Jang Hoon) and Let's Go Again, Korea! (Brown Eyed Girls and 4Minute) in Pump It Up Fiesta.
Really Really 리얼리 리얼리	Winner	Pump It Up XX	Version 2.00.0+ only International version only in Prime 2 and XX Really Really is unavailable in the Japanese version of Pump It Up Prime 2 and XX.
Moon Light Dance 문 라이트 댄스	TatshMusicCircle	Pump It Up XX	Moon Light Dance is the arranged version of "Lunatic Eyes: Invisible Full Moon" from dōjin video game Touhou Eiyashou: Imperishable Night. Moon Light Dance is the first and only J-Music song in Pump It Up Prime 2., and the final J-Music song added in the series, due to commercial failure in the Japanese market.
Step 스텝	SID-Sound	Present	Version 1.02.0+ only
Just Kiddin' 저스트 키딘	Vospi	Pump It Up XX	Version 1.01.0+ only
Nakakapagpabagabag 꺼림칙한	Dasu feat. Kagamine Len	Present	Version 1.10.0+ only
Heart Attack 하트 어택	DJ Counterforce	Present	Version 1.10.0+ only
Hush 허쉬	Yassi Pressman & Nadine Lustre	Present	Version 1.03.0+ only Philippine version only in Pump It Up Prime 2 Hush is the first new World Music song licensed from Southeast Asia since Pump It Up Fiesta 2. Hush was added to the international release of Pump It Up XX.
V3	Beautiful Day	Present	Version 2.00.0+ only V3 is a crossover song from O2Jam, and the third classical remix song based on Ludwig van Beethoven's "Pathétique" 3rd Movement after Beethoven Virus by BanYa from Pump It Up Perfect Collection and Latino Virus by Warak from Pump It Up Prime.
Cross Time 크로스 타임	Brandy	Present	Version 1.10.0+ only Cross Time is a crossover song from O2Jam.
The Festival of Ghost 2 (Sneak) 유령의 축제 2 (Sneak)	Brandy	Present	Version 2.01.0+ only The Festival of Ghost 2 (Sneak) is a crossover song and a sequel to Brandy's song, "The Festival of Ghost", both from O2Jam.
Helix 헬릭스	ESTi	Present	Version 1.03.0+ only Helix is a crossover song from O2Jam.
Hyperion 히페리온	M2U	Present	Version 1.03.0+ only Hyperion is a crossover song from O2Jam.
Black Dragon 블랙 드래곤	Memme	Present	Version 2.04.0+ only Black Dragon is a crossover song from O2Jam.
BSPower Explosion BS파워 익스플로전	Memme	Present	Version 2.05.0+ only BSPower Explosion is a crossover song from O2Jam.
Start On Red 스타트 온 레드	Nato	Present	Version 1.05.0+ only Start On Red is a crossover song from O2Jam. Start On Red's original title is "Start On <Red>".
Time Attack <Blue> 타임 어택 <블루>	r300k	Present	Version 1.09.0+ only Time Attack <Blue> is a crossover song from O2Jam.
Magical Vacation 매지컬 베케이션	SID-Sound	Present	Version 1.06.0+ only Magical Vacation is a crossover song from O2Jam.
Visual Dream II (In Fiction) 비주얼 드림 II (인 픽션)	Aragon	Present	Version 2.05.0+ only Visual Dream II (In Fiction) is a crossover song from O2Jam and the cover version of Brandy's song, "Visual Dream" from O2Jam.
Death Moon 사월	SHK	Present	Death Moon is a crossover song from O2Jam.
Super Stylin' 슈퍼 스타일린	Warak	Present	Version 1.04.0+ only Super Stylin' is a crossover song from O2Jam.
Christmas Memories 크리스마스의 기억	Beautiful Day / Music Remake by Warak	Present	Christmas Memories is a crossover song from O2Jam and the remake of Beautiful Day's song of the same name from O2Jam. Christmas Memories is the second cover of the song of the same name by Beautiful Day after Snow Dream by Apple Jam from Pump It Up NX. Christmas Memories is the first Christmas-themed song in the series since X-tree by BanYa from Pump It Up Fiesta.
Keep On! 킵 온!	AmamoriP	Present	Version 1.10.0+ only Keep On! is a crossover song from EZ2AC: Night Traveler.
Asterios -ReEntry- 아스테리오스 -리엔트리-	ATAS (Note: "NaSch" in Pump It Up Prime 2's titlecard. (NaSch is ATAS's pseudonym.))	Present	Asterios -ReEntry- is a crossover song from EZ2AC: Evolve.
Le Grand Bleu 라 그랑 블루	KIEN	Present	Le Grand Bleu is a crossover song from EZ2AC. (First appearance in EZ2DJ 7th TraX Class R - Codename:Violet.)
Infinity 인피니티	Lunatic Sounds	Present	Version 2.00.0+ only Infinity is a crossover song from EZ2AC. (Originally from EZ2ON: Reboot, but later included in EZ2AC: Evolve.)
Gothique Resonance 고딕 레조넌스	P4Koo	Present	Version 2.03.0+ only Gothique Resonance is a crossover song from EZ2AC: Evolve.
Bedlam 베들램	SANY-ON	Present	Version 1.07.0+ only Bedlam is a crossover song from EZ2AC: Evolve.
A Site De La Rue 어 사이트 데 라 루	Streme Reverie	Present	Version 2.04.0+ only A Site De La Rue is a crossover song from EZ2AC: Endless Circulation.
Clue 클루	Transin	Present	Version 1.01.0+ only Clue is a crossover song from EZ2AC: Night Traveler.
Redline 레드라인	Archefluxx	Present	Version 1.04.0+ only Redline is a crossover song from Neon FM.
Donatello 도나텔로	Triplestar	Present	Version 2.02.0+ only Donatello is a crossover song from Neon FM.
Vulcan 불카누스	Memme	Present	Mixes Avalanche and Hellfire
Shub Sothoth 슈브 소토스	Nato & EXC	Present	Version 2.05.0+ only Mixes Yog Sothoth and Shub Niggurath
Leather 리더	Doin	Present	Version 1.07.0+ only Mixes Leakage Voltage and Further (Doin)
Me Gustas Tu (Full Song) 오늘부터 우리는	GFriend	Exclusive	Version 1.01.0+ only
Bang Bang Bang (Full Song) 뱅뱅뱅	BigBang	Exclusive	International version only Bang Bang Bang (Full Song) is unavailable in the Japanese version of Pump It Up Prime 2.
Boombayah (Full Song) 붐바야	Blackpink	Exclusive	International version only Version 1.02.0+ only The song is unavailable in the Japanese version of Pump It Up Prime 2.
Up & Down (Full Song) 위아래	EXID	Exclusive	Version 1.05.0+ only
Acquaintance (Full Song) 주변인	Outsider	Exclusive	Version 1.06.0+ only
Hush (Full Song) 허쉬	Yassi Pressman & Nadine Lustre	Present	Version 1.03.0+ only Philippine version only in Pump It Up Prime 2 Hush (Full Song) was added to the international release of Pump It Up XX.
Chase Me (Full Song) 체이스 미	Dreamcatcher	Present	Version 1.09.0+ only
Sarabande (Shortcut) 사라반드	MAX	Present	
Death Moon (Shortcut) 사월	SHK	Present	
PRIME 2 Opening 프라임2 오프닝	MAX	Present	Version 1.04.0+ only
Shub Niggurath (Shortcut) 슈브 니구라스	Nato	Present	Version 1.08.0+ only
Hyperion (Shortcut) 히페리온	M2U	Present	Version 2.00.0+ only
Kasou Shinja (Shortcut) 가장신자	MAX	Present	Version 2.00.0+ only
As If It's Your Last	Blackpink	None	Cancelled song
Systemization (/DJS\ Remix)	Archefluxx	None	Cancelled song

=== XX (20th Anniversary Edition) (2019) ===
Song title (English/Korean)	Artist	Latest appearance	Notes
Jogging 조깅	Lucy	Present	Version 2.04.0+ only
The Little Prince (Prod. Godic) 어린 왕자 (Prod. Godic)	Haon, Pullik	Exclusive	Version 1.01.0+ only
Full Moon 풀 문	Dreamcatcher	Present	Version 1.05.0+ only
Timing 타이밍	Highteen	Present	Version 1.01.0+ only
Fly High 날아올라	Dreamcatcher	Present	
Black Cat 검은 고양이	Turbo	Exclusive	Version 1.04.0+ only Black Cat (XX) is the original version of Black Cat by Turbo from Pump It Up 1st Dance Floor. Black Cat (XX) is the first new song by Turbo since Pump It Up Fiesta at nine years, despite its album "280 km/h speed" being released in 1995.
Hann (Alone) 한(一)	(G)I-dle	Exclusive	International version only Hann (Alone) is unavailable in the Chinese version of Pump It Up XX.
Snapping 스냅핑	Chungha	Exclusive	Version 2.01.0+ only
Nekkoya (Pick Me) 내꺼야 (Pick Me)	Produce 48	Exclusive	Nekkoya (Pick Me) is the third part of "Pick Me" series of songs created and performed by South Korean talent reality competition franchise "Produce 101".
I'm So Sick 1도 없어	Apink	Exclusive	I'm So Sick is the first new song by Apink since Pump It Up Prime.
Boomerang 부메랑	Wanna One	Exclusive	
Gashina 가시나	Sunmi	Exclusive	Version 1.02.0+ only
Adios 아디오스	Everglow	Exclusive	Version 2.00.0+ only International version only Adios (Everglow) is unavailable in the Chinese version of Pump It Up XX.
HIT 히트	Seventeen	Exclusive	Version 2.00.0+ only
Bboom Bboom 뿜뿜	Momoland	Exclusive	
Rooftop 옥탑방	N.Flying	Exclusive	Version 2.00.0+ only
Bungee (Fall in Love) 번지 (Fall in Love)	Oh My Girl	Exclusive	Version 2.00.0+ only
Starry Night 별이 빛나는 밤	Mamamoo	Exclusive	Version 1.03.0+ only
Love Scenario 사랑을 했다	iKon	Exclusive	International version only Love Scenario is unavailable in the Japanese version of Pump It Up XX.
Time For The Moon Night 밤	GFriend	Exclusive	Version 1.02.0+ only
Bon Bon Chocolat 봉봉쇼콜라	Everglow	Exclusive	Version 2.02.0+ only International version only Bon Bon Chocolat is unavailable in the Chinese version of Pump It Up XX.
Very Nice 아주 Nice	Seventeen	Exclusive	
Good Bye 잘가라	Hong Jin Young	Exclusive	
You And I 유 앤 아이	Dreamcatcher	Present	Version 1.02.0+ only
King of Sales 판매왕	Norazo	Exclusive	Version 1.04.0+ only King of Sales is the first new song by Norazo since Pump It Up Prime.
Gotta Go 벌써 12시	Chungha	Exclusive	Version 2.03.0+ only
Boong Boong (Feat. Sik-K) (Prod. GroovyRoom) 붕붕 (Feat. 식케이) (Prod. GroovyRoom)	Haon	Exclusive	Version 1.01.0+ only
Wedding Crashers 웨딩 크래셔	SHK	Present	Wedding Crashers is the remix of "Wedding March" by Felix Mendelssohn.
Switronic 스위트로닉	SHK	Present	Version 2.01.0+ only
Obliteration 오블리터레이션	ATAS	Present	Obliteration is a sequel to Asterios -ReEntry- from EZ2AC and Pump It Up Prime 2.
Transacaglia in G-minor 트란사칼리아	ATAS	Present	Version 2.01.0+ only Transacaglia in G-minor is a remix of the sixth movement (Passacaglia) of George Frideric Handel's "Harpsichord Suite in G minor (HWV 432)".
1949	SLAM	Present	Version 1.02.0+ only 1949 is a sequel to 1950 from Pump It Up Prime. 1949's lyric "die" is changed to "run" in version 1.02.2, including its BGA change due to depicting Satanism references and Baphomet. 1949's second song with double level-28 chart
Janus 야누스	MAX	Present	Version 2.00.0+ only
I Want U 아이 원트 유	MAX	Present	
District 1 디스트릭트 1	MAX	Present	Version 2.02.0+ only
Sugar Plum 슈가 플럼	Mr. Weq	Present	Version 2.07.0+ only Sugar Plum is one of the finalist songs of the 2nd Pump It Up Contents Creation Contest. Sugar Plum is the remix of "Dance of the Sugar Plum Fairy" in "The Nutcracker" by Pyotr Ilyich Tchaikovsky.
Telling Fortune Flower 텔링 포츈 플라워	Koharu feat. Renyata	Present	Version 2.07.0+ only Telling Fortune Flower is one of the finalist songs of the 2nd Pump It Up Contents Creation Contest.
Nyarlathotep 니알라토텝	Nato	Present	Nyarlathotep is the third part of Nato's H. P. Lovecraft's Outer God series of songs and a sequel to Shub Niggurath from Pump It Up Prime 2. Nyarlathotep's portion of BGA has a blue screen of death whose message references the hardest step charts ever created: Paradoxx's Single 26 and Double 28 charts.
Heart Rabbit Coaster 하트 래빗 코스터	Nato	Present	Version 1.04.0+ only
Lepton Strike 립톤 스트라이크	Nato	Present	Version 2.00.0+ only Lepton Strike is a part of Nato's "Strike" series of songs originated from song data for Be-Music Source.
Skeptic 스켑틱	Doin	Present	
Iolite Sky 아이올라이트 스카이	Doin	Present	Version 2.03.0+ only
%X (Percent X) 퍼센트 엑스	Pory	Present	%X (Percent X) is a part of Pory's "%" series of songs originated from O2Jam.
La Cinquantaine 금혼식	Pory	Present	Version 2.03.0+ only La Cinquataine is the remix of the song of the same name, translated as "The Golden Wedding", by Jean Gabriel Prosper Marie.
Le Grand Rouge 라 그랑드 루즈	KIEN	Present	Le Grand Rouge is a sequel to Le Grand Bleu from EZ2AC and Pump It Up Prime 2.
Carmen Bus 까르멘 버스	StaticSphere & FUGU SUISAN	Present	Version 1.05.0+ only Carmen Bus is the remix of "Habanera" by Georges Bizet.
Macaron Day 마카롱 데이	HyuN	Present	
Ice of Death 아이스 오브 데스	Fiverwater	Present	Version 1.01.0+ only Ice of Death is the second classical remix song based on Johannes Brahms's "Hungarian Dances No.5" after Hungarian Dance V by BanYa Production from Pump It Up Fiesta EX.
Poseidon 포세이돈	Quree	Present	Poseidon is a remix of "Étude Op. 25, No. 12 in C minor" by Frédéric Chopin.
Adrenaline Blaster 아드레날린 블래스터	QWertism	Present	Version 2.02.0+ only
Vanish 배니쉬	Applesoda	Present	
Tales of Pumpnia 테일즈 오브 펌프니아	Applesoda	Present	Version 1.05.0+ only
Kimchi Fingers 김치 핑거즈	Garlic Squad	Present	Kimchi Fingers is the different lyrics, remixed version of Monkey Fingers by BanYa from Pump It Up Exceed. Kimchi Fingers's artist Garlic Squad consists of Kimsynth (also known as V.KIM) and DM Ashura.
Orbit Stabilizer 오르비트 스테빌라이저	DM Ashura	Present	Version 1.05.0+ only
Destrucimate 파괴	KURORAK	Present	Version 2.04.0+ only
Clematis Rapsodia 클레마티스 랩소디아	Jehezukiel	Present	Version 2.04.0+ only Clematis Rapsodia is a sequel to Twist of Fate (feat. Ruriling). Clematis Rapsodia is the second fastest original song in the series, with 260 BPM, before the release of See in Pump It Up Phoenix at 293 BPM.
Wicked Legend 위키드 레전드	D_AAN	Present	Version 2.00.0+ only Wicked Legend is a remix of "Asturias (Leyenda)" by Isaac Albéniz.
Tantanmen 탄탄멘	Memme	Present	Version 1.04.0+ only
Stardream (feat. Romelon) 스타드림 (feat. Romelon)	Cashew	Present	Version 2.04.0+ only
Can-Can ~Orpheus in the Party Mix~ 캉-캉 ~Orpheus in the Party Mix~	Sr. Lan Belmont	Present	Version 1.03.0+ only Can-Can ~Orpheus in the Party Mix~ is the 1st place song of the 2nd Pump It Up Contents Creation Contest. Can-Can ~Orpheus in the Party Mix~ is the remix of "Can Can from Orpheus in the Underworld" by Jacques Offenbach, which was first remixed in Radezky Can Can by F2 Systems in Pump It Up Extra.
Papasito (feat. KuTiNA) 파파시토 (feat. KuTiNA)	Yakikaze & Cashew	Present	Version 1.03.0+ only Papasito (feat. KuTiNA) is the 2nd place song of the 2nd Pump It Up Contents Creation Contest.
Fires of Destiny 파이어 오브 데스티니	Jehezukiel	Present	Version 1.03.0+ only Fires of Destiny is the 3rd place song of the 2nd Pump It Up Contents Creation Contest, and a direct prequel of Twist of Fate (feat. Ruriling).
The End of the World ft. Skizzo 디 엔드 오브 더 월드 ft. Skizzo	MonstDeath	Present	Version 1.03.0+ only The End of the World ft. Skizzo is the 4th place song of the 2nd Pump It Up Contents Creation Contest.
Forgotten Vampire 포가튼 뱀파이어	WyvernP	Present	Version 1.03.0+ only Forgotten Vampire is the 5th place song of the 2nd Pump It Up Contents Creation Contest.
Harmagedon 아마겟돈	HyuN vs lixound	Present	Version 2.06.0+ only (First appearance in Pump It Up M version 1.45+.) Harmagedon is the 1st place song of the 3rd Pump It Up Contents Creation Contest.
Repentance 리펜턴스	Abel	Present	Version 2.07.0+ only (First appearance in Pump It Up M version 1.46+.) Repentance is the 2nd place song of the 3rd Pump It Up Contents Creation Contest.
The Reverie 더 레버리	uma	Present	Version 2.05.0+ only (First appearance in Pump It Up M version 1.47+.) The Reverie is the 3rd place song of the 3rd Pump It Up Contents Creation Contest.
Cygnus 시그너스	nato	Present	Version 2.08.0+ only
Tropicanic 트로피카닉	SHK	Present	Version 2.08.0+ only
God Mode 2.0 feat. Skizzo 갓 모드 2.0 feat. Skizzo	Nato	Present	Version 2.05.0+ only (First appearance in Pump It Up M Version 1.39+) God Mode 2.0 feat. Skizzo is a sequel to God Mode feat. Skizzo from Pump It Up Prime 2. God Mode 2.0 feat. Skizzo is the first Pump It Up M song to be crossed over to the main Pump It Up series.
Slapstick Parfait 슬랩스틱 파르페	t+pazolite	Present	Version 2.06.0+ only Slapstick Parfait is a crossover song from Crossing Delta.
Paved Garden 페이브 가든	ginkiha	Present	Version 2.06.0+ only Paved Garden is a crossover song from Crossing Delta.
Pop Sequence 팝 시퀀스	Hommarju	Present	Version 2.06.0+ only Pop Sequence is a crossover song from Crossing Delta.
Crossing Delta 크로싱 델타	t+pazolite+ginkiha+Hommarju	Present	Version 2.06.0+ only Crossing Delta (song) is a crossover song from Crossing Delta.
Club Night 클럽 나이트	Matduke	Present	Club Night is the first new song by Matduke since Pump It Up Prime.
Indestructible 인디스트럭터블	Matduke	Present	Version 2.01.0+ only
86 (Note: "[86] ft. Gumi/Kagamine Len" in titlecard.)	Dasu	Present	86 is a sequel to Nakakapagpabagabag from Pump It Up Prime 2.
Cross Soul 크로스 소울	HyuN feat. Syepias	Present	Version 1.05.0+ only Cross Soul is the first part of HyuN's "Cross" series of songs and followed by multiple sequels, including Cross Over from Pump It Up Prime 2, Cross Ray (feat. 月下Lia) from Pump It Up XX (version 2.08.0), as well as "Cross Revolution" from Voez.
Broken Karma (PIU Edit) 브로큰 카르마 (PIU Edit)	Quree	Present	Version 2.03.0+ only Broken Karma (PIU Edit) is the arranged version of Quree's song of the same name from song data for Be-Music Source.
After a Thousand Years 천년이 지나서	TOTO	Present	Version 2.00.0+ only
Lala 라라	Yassi Pressman	Present	Version 2.00.0+ only
F(R)IEND 프렌드	D_AAN	Present	Version 1.04.0+ only
Conflict 컨플릭트	Siromaru + Cranky	Present	Version 1.03.0+ only Conflict is Cranky's first new song since Matador from Pump It Up Prime. Conflict was removed in Pump It Up Phoenix until its revival in v2.00.0.
Danger & Danger 데인저 & 데인저	Cranky	Present	Version 2.02.0+ only
Nihilism -Another Ver.- 니힐리즘 -어나더 버전-	Nato	Present	Version 1.01.0+ only Nihilism -Another Ver.- is the arranged version of Nato's song, "Nihilism" from EZ2DJ: Azure Expression.
Phalanx "RS2018 edit" 팔랑크스 "RS2018 edit"	Cranky (Note: In Phalanx "RS2018 edit", the co-composer kors k is uncredited for unknown reasons.)	Present	Version 1.05.0+ only
Point Zero 2 포인트 제로 2	SynthWulf	Present	Version 2.02.0+ only Point Zero 2 is a sequel to Point Zero One from Pump It Up Prime.
Brain Power 브레인 파워	NOMA	Present	Version 2.05.0+ only
Life is Piano 라이프 이즈 피아노	Junk	Present	Version 2.05.0+ only
Gloria 글로리아	Croire (Note: Composed by Katsuki Uemura, a member of the Japanese dōjin music group Croire.)	Present	Version 2.07.0+ only
Mopemope (Note: "もぺもぺ" in the titlecard and BGA.) 모페모페	LeaF (Note: "LeaF & Optie" in the titlecard and BGA. LeaF is the actual artist, and Optie is the visualizer.)	Present	Version 2.08.0+ only Mopemope also appears in various rhythm games. It is also notorious for its innocent/creepy genre in its background animation. Some of its parts such as disturbing content are censored.
Re : End of a Dream Re：엔드 오브 어 드림	uma vs. Morimori Atsushi	Present	Version 2.08.0+ only
Cross Ray (feat. 月下Lia) 크로스 레이 (feat. 月下Lia)	HyuN	Present	Version 2.08.0+ only Cross Ray is the third "Cross" series song added in the game, after Cross Over in Pump It Up Prime 2 and Cross Soul in Pump It Up XX.
Ultimatum 얼티메이텀	Cosmograph	Present	Version 2.08.0+ only (First appearance in Pump It Up M Version 1.41+) Ultimatum is used for a title event in-game that occurs from April 21 to June 23, 2022.
Kokugen Kairou Labyrinth 刻限回廊ラビリンス 시간의 회랑 라비린스	A:llha (ANE + 2riA)	Present	Version 2.07.0+ only (First appearance in Pump It Up M Version 1.42+)
Imagination 이미지네이션	SHK	Present	Imagination is a crossover song from O2Jam.
Black Swan 블랙 스완	Zeron	Present	Black Swan is a crossover song from O2Jam. Black Swan is the third remix of "Swan Lake" by Pyotr Ilyich Tchaikovsky followed by Red Swan by Yahpp from Pump It Up Prime and Ugly Dee by BanYa Production from Pump It Up NX.
Obelisque 오벨리스크	ESTi x M2U	Present	Obelisque is a crossover song from O2Jam. Obelisque is the spin-off of "Oblivion" by ESTi from DJMax Online whose true sequel "Anemone" appears in Sega's arcade music rhythm game Chunithm.
Rage of Fire 레이지 오브 파이어	MAX	Present	Version 1.02.0+ only Rage of Fire is a crossover song from O2Jam.
Dual Racing <Red vs Blue> 듀얼 레이싱 <레드 vs 블루>	Nato & r300k	Present	Version 2.02.0+ only Dual Racing <Red vs Blue> is a crossover song from O2Jam, and a sequel to Start On Red and Time Attack <Blue> in Pump It Up Prime 2.
Cycling! 싸이클링!	Yamajet feat. Amane (Cool&Create) (Note: "Yamajet feat. あまね (COOL&CREATE)" in titlecard and BGA.)	Present	Version 2.01.0+ only Cycling! is a crossover song from O2Jam.
Uranium 우라늄	Memme	Present	Version 2.00.0+ only Uranium is a crossover song from O2Jam and the prequel to Tritium in Pump It Up Prime 2.
Xeroize 제로아이즈	FE	Present	Version 1.01.0+ only Xeroize is a crossover song from O2Jam.
Rising Star 라이징 스타	M2U	Present	Version 1.04.0+ only Rising Star is a crossover song from O2Jam.
Cutie Song 일 더하기 일은 귀요미	Memme	Present	Version 2.03.0+ only Cutie Song is a crossover song from O2Jam.
Headless Chicken 헤드리스 치킨	r300k	Present	Version 2.04.0+ only Headless Chicken is a crossover song from O2Jam.
Over The Horizon 오버 더 호라이즌	Yamajet	Present	Version 2.04.0+ only Over The Horizon is a crossover song from O2Jam.
Loki 로키	Lotze	Present	Loki is a crossover song from EZ2AC. (First appearance in EZ2DJ 7th TraX Class R - Codename:Violet.) Lotze is one of SHK's pseudonyms.
Dement ~After Legend~ 디멘트 ~애프터 레전드~	Lunatic Sounds	Present	Dement ~After Legend~ is a crossover song from EZ2AC: Night Traveler and a sequel to Lunatic Sounds' song, "Legend" from EZ2AC: Endless Circulation.
Houseplan 하우스플랜	Houseplan	Present	Version 2.04.0+ only Houseplan (song) is a crossover song from EZ2AC: Night Traveler.
Your Mind 유어 마인드	Roy Mikelate	Present	Version 2.00.0+ only Your Mind is a crossover song from EZ2AC: Evolve.
Brown Sky 하늘다람쥐	Doin	Present	Version 2.08.0+ only Mixes Iolite Sky and The Quick Brown Fox Jumps Over The Lazy Dog.
Desaparecer 데사파레세르	Applesoda vs MAX	Present	Mixes Vanish and Sarabande.
ERRORCODE: 0 에러코드: 0	Doin && Sunny	Present	Version 2.04.0+ only Mixes Iolite Sky, Skeptic, The Quick Brown Fox Jumps Over The Lazy Dog, Removable Disk0, Leakage Voltage, Further (Doin) and Leather.
Meteo5cience (GADGET mix) (Note: "Meteo5cience" (메테오 사이언스) in Pump It Up XX version 1.02.0 and 1.02.1.) 메테오 사이언스 (GADGET mix)	Paul Bazooka	Present	Version 1.02.0+ only Mixes Meteorize and Mad5cience.
Fire Noodle Challenge 파이어 누들 챌린지	Memme	Present	Version 2.02.0+ only Mixes Chinese Restaurant and Tantanmen.
Prime Time 프라임 타임	Cashew	Present	Version 1.05.0+ only Mixes Anguished Unmaking, 1950, Achluoias, Red Snow, Gothique Resonance, Break It Down, A Site De La Rue, video out c, Annihilator Method, Further (Doin) and Ragnarok. Prime Time's Double Performance 24 chart has a unique gimmick, where a player decides the difficulty yourself whether it is Easy, Normal, and Hard.
Good Night (Full Song) 굿 나이트	Dreamcatcher	Present	Version 2.08.0+ only
Full Moon (Full Song) 풀 문	Dreamcatcher	Present	Version 2.05.0+ only
Hann (Alone) (Full Song) 한(一)	(G)I-dle	Exclusive	Version 2.00.0+ only International version only Hann (Alone) (Full Song) is unavailable in the Chinese version of Pump It Up XX.
Nekkoya (Pick Me) (Full Song) 내꺼야 (Pick Me)	Produce 48	Exclusive	Version 2.03.0+ only
Bboom Bboom (Full Song) 뿜뿜	Momoland	Exclusive	
I'm So Sick (Full Song) 1도 없어	Apink	Exclusive	Version 2.02.0+ only
Gashina (Full Song) 가시나	Sunmi	Exclusive	Version 1.03.0+ only
Starry Night (Full Song) 별이 빛나는 밤	Mamamoo	Exclusive	Version 1.04.0+ only
Time For The Moon Night (Full Song) 밤	GFriend	Exclusive	Version 2.02.0+ only
Very Nice (Full Song) 아주 Nice	Seventeen	Exclusive	Version 2.01.0+ only
Good Bye (Full Song) 잘가라	Hong Jin Young	Exclusive	Version 2.03.0+ only
Papasito (feat. KuTiNA) (Full Song) 파파시토 (feat. KuTiNA)	Yakikaze & Cashew	Present	Version 2.07.0+ only
Allegro Con Fuoco (Full Song) 알레그로 콘 뿌오코	DM Ashura	Present	Version 1.02.0+ only Allegro Con Fuoco (Full Song) is the full version of Allegro Con Fuoco from Pump It Up Pro 2.
86 (Full Song)	Dasu	Present	Version 1.01.0+ only
Paradoxx (Shortcut) 패러독스	SLAM & Nato	Present	Version 2.08.0+ only
Nyarlathotep (Shortcut) 니알라토텝	Nato	Present	
Wedding Crashers (Shortcut) 웨딩 크래셔	SHK	Present	
Can-Can ~Orpheus in the Party Mix~ (Shortcut) 캉-캉 ~Orpheus in the Party Mix~	Sr. Lan Belmont	Present	Version 1.05.0+ only
XX Opening XX 오프닝	MAX	Present	Version 1.01.0+ only XX Opening is the fifth shortcut song of playable Pump It Up opening songs.
I Want U (Shortcut) 아이 원트 유	MAX	Present	Version 2.03.0+ only
Poseidon (Shortcut) 포세이돈	Quree	Present	Version 1.03.0+ only
Switronic (Shortcut) 스위트로닉	SHK	Present	Version 2.01.0+ only

=== Phoenix (2023) ===
Song title (English/Korean)	Artist	Latest appearance	Notes
Uh-Heung 호랑이가 쫓아온다	DKZ	Exclusive	Version 2.01.0+ only Uh-Heung can be seen in the opening demo loop of Pump It Up Phoenix 2024 since version 2.00.0 update.
DO or DIE 두 올 다이	xikers	Exclusive	Version 2.02.0+ only DO or DIE can be seen in the opening demo loop of Pump It Up Phoenix 2024 since version 2.00.0 update.
Crush 크러쉬	Zerobaseone	Exclusive	Version 2.00.0+ only
Discord 디스코드	QWER	Exclusive	Version 2.01.0+ only Discord can be seen in the opening demo loop of Pump It Up Phoenix 2024 since version 2.00.0 update.
Bubble 버블	STAYC	Exclusive	Version 2.00.0+ only
Queencard 퀸카	(G)I-dle	Exclusive	Version 2.00.0+ only
Boca 보카	Dreamcatcher	Exclusive	International version only Boca was available in the early access version of Pump It Up Phoenix. Boca is unavailable in the Japanese version of Pump It Up Phoenix Boca is the first and only song by Dreamcatcher to be removed, despite it being their newest K-Pop song entry in the Pump It Up series.
Nxde 누드	(G)I-dle	Exclusive	Nxde is the remix of "Habanera" by Georges Bizet, and the third song based on the same composition, after Higgledy Piggledy by BanYa Production from Pump It Up NX2 and Carmen Bus by StaticSphere & FUGU SUISAN from Pump It Up XX.
Teddy Bear 테디 베어	STAYC	Exclusive	
Alone 얼론	Highlight	Exclusive	Alone is the first new song by Highlight, rebranded from "Beast" after Jang Hyun-seung's departure in 2016, since Pump It Up Fiesta EX with their previous song Shock.
Amor Fati 아모르 파티	Kim Yon Ja	Exclusive	
After Like 애프터 라이크	Ive	Exclusive	After Like was available in the early access version of Pump It Up Phoenix. After Like use samples for "I Will Survive" by Gloria Gaynor.
Eleven 일레븐	Ive	Exclusive	Version 1.04.0+ only Eleven appears in Pump It Up Phoenix's opening demo loop, despite being unavailable in the song selection screen in its initial release until version 1.04.0.
Pirate 파이렛	Everglow	Exclusive	Version 1.02.0+ only Pirate was seen on Pump It Up Phoenix's song selection screen on a flyer present at PlayX4 before the game's release.
Tomboy 톰보이	(G)I-dle	Exclusive	Version 1.06.0+ only
Whisper 위스퍼	The Boyz	Exclusive	Version 1.03.0+ only Whisper was seen on the Pump It Up Phoenix's song selection screen on a flyer present at PlayX4 before the game's release.
Spray 스프레이	WEi	Exclusive	Version 1.05.0+ only Spray was seen on Pump It Up Phoenix's song selection screen on a flyer present at PlayX4 before the game's release.
Beautiful Liar 뷰티플 라이어	Monsta X	Exclusive	Version 1.01.0+ only
Pandora 판도라	Mave:	Exclusive	Version 1.06.0+ only Pandora (Mave:) was seen on the Pump It Up Phoenix's song selection screen on a flyer present at PlayX4 before the game's release. Pandora is the slowest song in the series with 75 BPM.
Storm 스톰	Koyote	Present	Version 1.01.0+ only Storm (Koyote) is the first new song by Koyote since Pump It Up Fiesta in 13 years
Airplane 비행기	Typhoon	Present	Version 1.01.0+ only Airplane is the cover version of the song originally composed by Turtles. Airplane is the first new song by Typhoon since Pump It Up NX in 17 years, albeit not a new original song.
Nostalgia 노스탤지어	Woody	Present	Version 2.03.0+ only Nostalgia can be seen in the opening demo loop of Pump It Up Phoenix 2024 since version 2.00.0 update.
Festival of Death Moon 사월의 축제	SHK	Present	Version 2.06.0+ only (First appearance in Pump It Up M Version 1.39+) Festival of Death Moon is the arranged version of Death Moon from O2Jam and Pump It Up Prime 2.
ESP	nato	Present	Version 2.07.0+ only (First appearance in Pump It Up M Version 1.37+)
Autumn Break 어텀 브레이크	Cosmograph	Exclusive	First appearance in Pump It Up M Version 1.40+ Autumn Break was added in Pump It Up Phoenix version 2.09.0 but was immediately removed in version 2.09.1 due to a song version mishap, where the "prototype" version was used without permission since Pump It Up M instead of the final version from the composer's SoundCloud.
Highway Chaser 하이웨이 체이서	Cosmograph	Present	Version 2.01.0+ only (First appearance in Pump It Up M Version 1.40+)
Eternal Universe 이터널 유니버스	Quree	Present	Version 2.09.0+ only (First appearance in Pump It Up M Version 1.45+)
Burn Out 번 아웃	WyvernP	Present	Version 2.08.0+ only (First appearance in Pump It Up M Version 1.46+)
4NT	PODA	Present	Version 2.10.0+ only (First appearance in Pump It Up M Version 1.47+)
Ultimate Eyes 얼티밋 아이즈	HyuN	Present	Version 2.08.0+ only (First appearance in Pump It Up M Version 1.44+)
Nyan-turne (feat. KuTiNA) 냥-턴 (feat. KuTiNA)	Cashew & Castellia	Present	Version 2.05.0+ only (First appearance in Pump It Up M Version 1.49+) Nyan-turne (feat. KuTiNA) is the remix of "Nocturne, Op. 9 No. 2" by Frédéric Chopin.
Vector 벡터	Zekk	Present	Vector was available in the early access version of Pump It Up Phoenix.
Versailles 베르사이유	HyuN & MIIM	Present	
The Apocalypse 더 아포칼립스	HyuN feat. Elika	Present	Version 2.10.0+ only
Showdown 쇼다운	litmus*	Present	
BOOOM!! 붐!!	RiraN	Present	Version 1.01.0+ only
Euphorianic 유포리아닉	SHK	Present	
Halloween Party ~Multiverse~ 할로윈 파티 ~Multiverse~	SHK	Present	Version 1.03.0+ only
Jupin 쥬핀	Sobrem	Present	Jupin was available in the early access version of Pump It Up Phoenix. Jupin is later crossovered to Chrono Circle
Ghroth 그로스	nato	Present	Version 1.02.0+ only Ghroth is the fourth part of nato's H.P Lovecraft's Outer God series of songs and a sequel to Nyarlathotep from Pump It Up XX. Ghroth is later crossed-over to Chrono Circle
KUGUTSU (Note: Originally a premium-exclusive song, currently available in all modes as of Pump It Up Phoenix version 2.13.0 and Pump it Up Phoenix 2.) 꼭두각시	onoken	Present	Version 1.01.0+ only KUGUTSU marks onoken's debut in the Pump It Up series. KUGUTSU was unavailable in the early access version for Pump It Up Phoenix 2.
Flavor Step! 플레이버 스텝!	EmoCosine	Present	Version 1.06.0+ only
Dead End 데드 엔드	Cosmograph	Present	Version 2.11.0+ only
Lucid Dream 루시드 드림	Cosmograph	Present	Version 1.08.0+ only
See 시	Doin	Present	Version 1.07.0+ only
Etude Op 10–4 추격	MAX	Present	Etude Op 10-4 is a remix of Frédéric Chopin's composition of the same name.
Stardream -Eurobeat Remix- 스타드림 -Eurobeat Remix-	MAX x Cashew x Dave Rodgers	Present	Version 2.03.0+ only Stardream -Eurobeat Remix- is a eurobeat remix and English version of Stardream (feat. Romelon) from Pump It Up XX.
1948	SLAM	Present	Version 2.08.0+ only 1948 is the threequel to 1950 from Pump It Up Prime and 1949 from Pump It Up XX. First confirmed D29 in the series. (Rated as ?? in-arcade)
Duel 결투	Cashew & D_AAN	Present	Version 2.04.0+ only
Vanish 2 – Roar of the invisible dragon 배니쉬 2 – Roar of the invisible dragon	Applesoda	Present	Version 2.09.0+ only
Lacrimosa 라크리모사	Fiverwater	Present	Version 1.03.0+ only Lacrimosa is a remix of Wolfgang Amadeus Mozart's Requiem in D minor, K. 626. Lacrimosa is Fiverwater's second song in Pump It Up following Ice of Death in Pump It Up XX version 1.01.0.
Solfeggietto 솔페지에토	Fiverwater	Present	Version 1.08.0+ only (First appearance in Pump It Up M Version 1.48+) Solfeggietto is a joint 4th place song of the 3rd Pump It Up Contents Creation Contest. Solfeggietto is the remix of "Solfeggietto" by Carl Philipp Emanuel Bach.
MURDOCH 머독	WONDERTRAVELER Project	Present	Version 1.02.0+ only (First appearance in Pump It Up M Version 1.49+.) MURDOCH is a joint 5th place song of 3rd Pump It Up Contents Creation Contest.
Little Munchkin 리틀 먼치킨	Castellia	Present	Version 1.07.0+ only (First appearance in Pump It Up M Version 1.45+) Little Munchkin is a joint 6th place song of the 3rd Pump It Up Contents Creation Contest. Little Munchkin is the remix of "Minuets in G major (BWV Anh. 114)" by Christian Petzold.
Simon Says, EURODANCE!! (feat. Sara☆M) 사이먼 세이즈, 유로댄스!! (feat. Sara☆M)	Jehezukiel☆KAZEMURA☆HideKy	Present	Version 1.07.0+ only (First appearance in Pump It Up M Version 1.46+) Simon Says, EURODANCE!! (feat. Sara☆M) is a joint 7th place song of the 3rd Pump It Up Contents Creation Contest.
Barber's Madness 바버스 매드니스	Klass E	Present	Version 1.04.0+ only (First appearance in Pump It Up M Version 1.47+) Barber's Madness is a joint 8th place song of the 3rd Pump It Up Contents Creation Contest. Barber's Madness is the remix of "The Barber of Seville - Overture" by Gioachino Rossini.
Yo! Say!! Fairy!!! 요! 세이!! 페어리!!!	MYUKKE.	Present	Version 1.05.0+ only (First appearance in Pump It Up M Version 1.48+) Yo! Say!! Fairy!!! is a joint 9th place song of the 3rd Pump It Up Contents Creation Contest.
Le Nozze di Figaro ~Celebrazione Remix~ 피가로의 결혼 ~Celebrazione Remix~	Sr. Lan Belmont	Present	Version 1.08.0+ only (First appearance in Pump It Up M Version 1.49+) Le Nozze di Figaro ~Celebrazione Remix~ is a joint 10th place song of the 3rd Pump It Up Contents Creation Contest. Le Nozze di Figaro ~Celebrazione Remix~ is the remix of "The Marriage of Figaro - Overture" by Wolfgang Amadeus Mozart.
Demon of Laplace 데몬 오브 라플라스	Quree	Present	Version 2.10.0+ only
Bluish Rose 블루이쉬 로즈	WyvernP	Present	Version 1.06.0+ only
Lohxia 록시아	The Musical Ghost	Present	Version 1.02.0+ only
PRiMA MATERiA 프리마 마테리아	xi	Present	Version 1.08.0+ only
Imperium 임페리움	Sakuzyo	Present	Version 2.00.0+ only
Neo Catharsis 네오 카타르시스	TAG underground overlay	Present	Version 1.04.0+ only Neo Catharsis marks Yasuhiro Taguchi's debut in the Pump It Up series.
Appassionata 열정	Cashew x D_AAN x Jehezukiel	Present	Version 2.02.0+ only Appassionata is a remix of the 3rd movement (Allegro ma non troppo) from Piano Sonata No. 23 by Ludwig van Beethoven.
Super Akuma Emperor 초악마황제	REDALiCE	Present	Version 2.08.0+ only
Curiosity Overdrive 큐리아서티 오버드라이브	t+pazolite	Present	Version 1.05.0+ only
SONIC BOOM 소닉 붐	USAO	Present	Version 2.05.0+ only
MEGAHEARTZ 메가하츠	DJ Noriken	Present	Version 2.01.0+ only
Darkside Of The Mind 다크사이드 오브 더 마인드	DJ Myosuke	Present	Version 2.07.0+ only
E.O.N	HiTECH NINJA	Present	Version 2.06.0+ only
CHAOS AGAIN 카오스 어게인	NAOKI underground -Ω-	Present	Version 1.02.0+ only CHAOS AGAIN marks Naoki Maeda's debut in the Pump It Up series. CHAOS AGAIN is the spiritual sequel to "CHAOS" from DanceDanceRevolution SuperNOVA.
Solve My Hurt 솔브 마이 허트	Doin	Present	Version 2.09.0+ only
Glimmer Gleam 글리머 글림	Doin	Present	Version 2.10.0+ only
Sudden Appearance Image 서든 어페어런스 이미지	Blacklolita	Present	Version 1.07.0+ only
Deca Dance 데카 댄스	Yooh	Present	Version 2.08.0+ only
New Rose 뉴 로즈	Hommarju	Present	Version 2.07.0+ only
Hercules 헤라클레스	Abel	Present	Version 2.00.0+ only Hercules is a joint 1st place song of the 4th Pump It Up Contents Creation Contest.
INVASION 인베이젼	D_AAN	Present	Version 2.04.0+ only INVASION is a joint 2nd place song of the 4th Pump It Up Contests Creation Contest.
Earendel 에렌델	Palami feat. neur6sia	Present	Version 2.01.0+ only Earendel is a joint 3rd place song of the 4th Pump It Up Contests Creation Contest.
Hymn of Golden Glory 힘 오브 골든 글로리	Essbee	Present	Version 2.03.0+ Only Hymn of Golden Glory is a joint 4th place song of the 4th Pump It Up Contests Creation Contest. Hymn of Golden Glory is the first Music Contest song to be exclusive to Premium Mode.
Athena's Shield 아테나의 방패	Jehezukiel	Present	Version 2.01.0+ only Athena's Shield is a joint 5th place song of the 4th Pump It Up Contents Creation Contest.
Murdoch vs Otada 머독 vs 오타다	ESPITZ vs WONDERTRAVELER Project	Present	Version 2.02.0+ only Murdoch vs Otada is a joint sixth place song of the fourth Pump It Up Contests Creation Contest. Murdoch vs Otada is the remix of Caprice of DJ Otada by BanYa Production, which first appeared in Pump It Up NXA.
wither garden 위더가든	uma feat.橘花音	Present	Version 2.00.0+ only wither garden is a joint seventh place song of the fourth Pump It Up Contents Creation Contest.
Imaginarized City 이매저너라이즈드 시티	Reku Mochizuki	Present	Version 2.06.0+ only Imaginarized City is a joint eighth place song of the fourth Pump It Up Contests Creation Contest.
Crimson hood 크림슨 후드	Springhead	Present	Version 2.07.0+ only Crimson hood is a joint ninth place song of the fourth Pump It Up Contests Creation Contest.
Doppelgänger 도플갱어	MonstDeath	Present	Version 2.05.0+ only Doppelgänger is a joint tenth place song of the fourth Pump It Up Contents Creation Contest.
Binary Star 바이너리 스타	Synthwulf	Present	Version 2.11.0+ only (First appearance in Pump It Up M Version 1.41+)
About The Universe 어바웃 더 유니버스	SOTUI & MIssionary	Present	Version 2.09.0+ only (First appearance in Pump It Up M Version 1.44+)
Perpetual 퍼페츄얼	Qu-ail	Present	Version 2.03.0+ only (First appearance in Pump It Up M Version 1.47+)
Dancing 댄싱	Said	Present	Version 2.02.0+ only (First appearance in Pump It Up M Version 1.44+)
Galaxy Collapse 갤럭시 컬랩스	Kurokotei	Present	Version 1.03.0+ only (First appearance in Pump It Up M Version 1.43+) Galaxy Collapse is the arranged version of "Heian Alien" from dōjin video game Touhou Seirensen: Undefined Fantastic Object.
Fracture Temporelle 프렉쳐 텀퍼렐르	Kurokotei	Present	Version 2.01.0+ only (First appearance in Pump It Up M Version 1.45+)
Catastrophe 카타스트로피	rareguy & MonstDeath	Present	Version 2.07.0+ only (First appearance in Pump It Up M Version 1.48+)
Human Extinction (PIU Edit.) 휴먼 익스팅션 (PIU Edit.)	MonstDeath	Present	Version 2.08.0+ only (First appearance in Pump It Up M Version 1.45+)
That Kitty (PIU Edit.) 댓키티 (PIU Edit.)	MonstDeath	Present	Version 2.10.0+ only (First appearance in Pump It Up M Version 1.43+)
Underworld ft. Skizzo (PIU Edit.) 언더월드 ft. Skizzo (PIU Edit.)	MonstDeath vs Neutral Moon	Present	Version 2.04.0+ only (First appearance in Pump It Up M Version 1.43+)
Nade Nade 네이드 네이드	Doin	Present	Version 2.07.0+ only
GOODTEK 굿텍	EBIMAYO	Present	GOODTEK was available in the early access version of Pump It Up Phoenix. GOODTEK is a crossover song from Chrono Circle
CO5M1C R4ILR0AD 코스믹 레일로드	kanone	Present	CO5M1C R4ILR0AD was available in the early access version of Pump It Up Phoenix. CO5M1C R4ILR0AD is a crossover song from Chrono Circle
Energy Synergy Matrix 에너지 시너지 매트릭스	Tanchiky	Present	Energy Synergy Matrix is a crossover song from Chrono Circle
MilK 밀크	Morimori Atsushi	Present	MilK is a crossover song from Chrono Circle
Acquire 어콰이어	ryhki	Present	Acquire was available in the early access version of Pump It Up Phoenix. Acquire is a crossover song from Chrono Circle
Pneumonoultramicroscopicsilicovolcanoconiosis ft. Kagamine Len/GUMI 진폐증 ft. Kagamine Len/GUMI	DASU	Present	Pneumonoultramicroscopicsilicovolcanoconiosis ft. Kagamine Len/GUMI was available in the early access version of Pump It Up Phoenix. Pneumonoultramicroscopicsilicovolcanoconiosis ft. Kagamine Len/GUMI has the longest word within the song title in Pump It Up series with 45 characters (or 67 if counting subtitle), beating its prequel Nakakapagpabagabag from Pump It Up Prime 2 with 18 characters.
Altale 알테일	Sakuzyo	Present	Altale is the first new song by Sakuzyo since Pump It Up Prime Japanese Edition, despite it being composed in 2014. Altale is a crossover song from Chrono Circle Altale is the third-lengthiest or longest regular song in the Pump It Up series at 2 minutes and 30 seconds, and the second-longest Premium regular song in such series, only to be beaten by Quattuorux from Pump It Up Phoenix 2.
iRELLiA 이렐리아	HyuN	Present	Version 1.05.0+ only
GOODBOUNCE 굿바운스	EBIMAYO	Present	Version 1.01.0+ only GOODBOUNCE is a crossover song from Chrono Circle
Alice in Misanthrope 앨리스 인 미산트로프	LeaF	Present	Version 2.11.0+ only Alice in Misanthrope is a crossover song from Chrono Circle
R.I.P.	eicateve	Present	Version 1.02.0+ only R.I.P. is a crossover song from Chrono Circle
EMOMOMO 에모모모	Ras	Present	Version 2.06.0+ only EMOMOMO is a crossover song from Chrono Circle
PUPA 푸파	Morimori Atsushi	Present	Version 1.05.0+ only PUPA was announced during the first Q&A session at PlayX4. It is also the only Premium Mode exclusive song to be made by Morimori Atsushi. PUPA is a crossover song from Chrono Circle
Stager 스테이저	Ras	Present	Version 1.07.0+ only Stager is a crossover song from Chrono Circle
Rush-More 러쉬-모어	litmus*	Present	Version 2.01.0+ only
Rush-Hour 러쉬-아워	litmus*	Present	Version 2.08.0+ only
* this game does not exist * * 이 게임은 존재하지 않습니다 *	litmus* x Ester	Present	Version 2.03.0+ only
Mahika 마히카	The Musical Ghost	Present	Version 2.02.0+ only
Giselle 지젤	Sobrem a.k.a. Widowmaker	Present	Version 2.00.0+ only
Spooky Macaron 스푸키 마카롱	Sobrem	Present	Version 2.10.0+ only
Aragami 아라가미	xi	Present	Version 1.04.0+ only Aragami was shown in the second teaser for Pump It Up Phoenix. Aragami is a crossover song from Chrono Circle
Halcyon 할시온	xi	Present	Halcyon is a crossover song from Cytus and Chrono Circle
Destr0yer (feat. Nikki Simmons) 디스트로이어 (feat Nikki Simmons)	Sakuzyo	Present	Version 1.08.0+ only Destr0yer is a crossover song from Chrono Circle Destr0yer (feat. Nikki Simmons) was announced during the first Q&A session at PlayX4. Destr0yer is the lengthiest or longest non-Premium regular song in the Pump It Up series, at 2 minutes and 40 seconds, beating Altale by Sakuzyo from Pump It Up Phoenix with just 2 minutes and 30 seconds, and Quattuorux from Pump It Up Phoenix 2 with just 2 minutes 35 seconds.
Big Daddy 빅 대디	USAO	Present	Version 2.00.0+ only Big Daddy was announced during the second Q&A session at PlayX4.
FLVSH OUT 플래시 아웃	Getty	Present	Version 2.07.0+ only
Odin 오딘	Gram	Present	Version 2.04.0+ Only
Becouse of You 비코즈 오브 유	Srav3R & USAO	Present	Version 2.09.0+ only
†DOOF†SENC† †도프†센시†	Kobaryo	Present	Version 2.10.0+ only
Poppin' Shower 팝핀 샤워	P*Light	Present	Version 2.00.0+ only Poppin' Shower is a crossover song debuted in BEMANI's arcade music rhythm video game SOUND VOLTEX IV HEAVENLY HAVEN. Poppin' Shower was the fifth top rated song of THE BMS OF FIGHTERS 2011 -Intersection of conflict- Be-Music Source contest.
Break Through Myself feat. Risa Yuzuki 브레이크 스루 마이셀프 feat. Risa Yuzuki	DJ Myosuke & Laur	Present	Version 2.06.0+ only
Viyella's Nightmare 비옐라의 악몽	Laur	Present	Version 1.04.0+ only
Chobit Flavor 쵸빗 플레이버	aran & t-pazolite	Present	Version 2.01.0+ only
ALiVE 얼라이브	REDALiCE	Present	Version 2.09.0+ only ALiVE is a crossover song from Chrono Circle
TRICKL4SH 220 트릭크래쉬 220	Lite Show Magic	Present	Version 1.06.0+ only TRICKL4SH 220 marks Lite Show Magic's debut in the Pump It Up series (In detail, C-Show's debut, alongside his collaborator, t+pazolite.) TRICKL4SH 220 is the first song without its song title written on both its background and jacket.
Extreme Music School 1st period (feat. Nanahira) 익스트림 음악학원 1교시 feat. Nanahira	Massive New Krew & RoughSketch	Present	Version 2.05.0+ only
Extreme Music School 2nd period (feat. Nanahira) 익스트림 음악학원 2교시 feat. Nanahira	Massive New Krew & RoughSketch	Present	Version 2.05.0+ only
BATTLE NO.1 배틀 넘버원	TANO*C Sound Team	Present	Version 1.02.0+ only All artists are involved in this song are regular composers for the TANO*C label.
Soldiers (TANO*C W TEAM RED ANTHEM) 솔저스 (TANO*C W TEAM RED ANTHEM)	DJ Noriken	Present	Version 2.04.0+ only Soldiers (TANO*C W TEAM RED ANTHEM) is a crossover song from Chrono Circle
Horang Pungryuga 호랑풍류가	Sangnoksu feat. HANANA	Present	Version 2.00.0+ only
Heliosphere 헬리오스피어	BlackY	Present	Version 2.12.0+ only Heliosphere is a crossover song from Chrono Circle. Heliosphere marks BlackY's debut in Pump It Up series. Both Heliosphere and SWEET WONDERLAND are the first Xross songs added in Pump It Up Phoenix since Pump It Up XX ver. 2.04.0.
SWEET WONDERLAND 스위트 원더랜드	MAX feat. ankimo	Present	Version 2.12.0+ only SWEET WONDERLAND is a crossover song from Chrono Circle. Both SWEET WONDERLAND and Heliosphere are the first Xross songs added in Pump It Up Phoenix since Pump It Up XX ver. 2.04.0. SWEET WONDERLAND is a sequel song from Sugar Conspiracy Theory to Pump It Up Prime 2015.
DISTRICT V 디스트릭트 V	Zekk vs MAX	Present	Version 2.06.0+ only Mixes Vector and District 1
Teddy Bear (Full Song) 테디 베어 (Full Song)	STAYC	Exclusive	Version 2.06.0+ only
Euphorianic (Shortcut) 유포리아닉	SHK	Present	Version 1.03.0+ only
Phoenix Opening 피닉스 오프닝	MAX	Present	Version 2.07.0+ only Phoenix Opening is the sixth shortcut song of playable Pump It Up opening songs.
Jupin (Shortcut) 쥬핀	Sobrem	Present	Version 2.06.0+ only
Ghroth (Shortcut) 그로스	nato	Present	Version 2.07.0+ only
Neo Catharsis (Shortcut) 네오 카타르시스	TAG underground overlay	Present	Version 2.08.0+ only
Hymn of Golden Glory (Shortcut) 힘 오브 골든 글로리	Essbee	Present	Version 2.08.0+ only
Halloween Party ~Multiverse~ (Shortcut) 할로윈 파티 ~Multiverse~	SHK	Present	Version 2.09.0+ only
Stardream -Eurobeat Remix- (Shortcut) 스타드림 -Eurobeat Remix-	MAX x Cashew x Dave Rodgers	Present	Version 2.09.0+ only
PRiMA MATERiA (Shortcut) 프ㄹi마 마테ㄹi아	xi	Present	Version 2.10.0+ only
Duel (Shortcut) 결투	Cashew & D_AAN	Present	Version 2.10.0+ only
Murdoch vs Otada (Shortcut) 머독 vs 오타다	ESPITZ vs WONDERTRAVELER Project	Present	Version 2.11.0+ only
Solve My Hurt (Shortcut) 솔브 마이 허트	Doin	Present	Version 2.11.0+ only
It's Me 잇츠 미	ILLIT	Exclusive	It's Me is a limited-time promotional song in collaboration with Belift Lab only in Pump It Up Phoenix. It's Me is the first promotional song since both versions of Let's Go Again, Korea that were released in Pump It Up Fiesta.

=== Phoenix 2 (2026) ===
Song title	Artist	Lastest appearance	Notes
The Stranger 더 스트레인저	ONF	Present	The Stranger appears in Pump It Up Phoenix 2's opening demo loop. Version 1.01.0+ only
T.B.H 고민중독	QWER	Present	T.B.H was available in the early access version of Pump It Up Phoenix 2.
I DON'T CARE 아이 돈 케어	Baby Dont Cry		Version 1.03.0+ only.
Nemonemo 네모네모	Yena	Present	Nemonemo appears in Pump It Up Phoenix 2's opening demo loop. Version 1.02.0+ only
Do the Dance 빌려온 고양이	ILLIT	Present	Do the Dance was available in the early access version of Pump It Up Phoenix 2.
Bang Bang 뱅 뱅	IVE	Present	Bang Bang was available in the early access version of Pump It Up Phoenix 2.
404 (New Era) 404 (뉴 에라)	KiiiKiii	Present	404 (New Era) was available in the early access version of Pump It Up Phoenix 2.
Call Me Back 콜 미 백	TNX	Present	Version 1.01.0+ only
Die Another Day 다이 어나더 데이	TNX	Present	Version 1.01.0+ only
Enjoy The Show 엔조이 더 쇼	RiraN ft. Negoto Bunnyla	Present	
Mephitz 메피츠	Litmus* as Ester	Present	Version 1.02.0+ only.
Punishment Restaurant 응징 레스토랑	Memme	Present	Punishment Restaurant is a sequel to Chinese Restaurant from Pump It Up XX.
Falling Stars 꼬리별	WyvernP	Present	Version 1.02.0+ only.
Ghost Bloody Train 유령혈차	Fiverwater	Present	Version 1.01.0+ Ghost Bloody Train is the remix of "Le Chemin de fer Op.27" by Charles-Valentin Alkan.
BLAZOR 블레이저	WONDERTRAVELER Project	Present	BLAZOR is a remake version from Blazing composed by BanYa from Pump It Up Exceed.
Until Defined 언틸 디파인드	Palami feat. Dyon Joo & neur6sia	Present	Version 1.02.0+ only.
Storm Chaser	r300k		Version 1.03.0+ only.
B3	MAX	Present	B3 is the third part of "BLEED" series of songs and a sequel to B2 from Pump It Up PRIME. B3 was available in the early access version of Pump It Up Phoenix 2.
Digitails 디기탈리스	NeLiME	Present	Digitails was available in the early access version of Pump It Up Phoenix 2.
The Last Rebellion 더 라스트 리벨리온	Monstdeath	Present	
::POINT_NEMO:: 포인트_니모	xi		Version 1.03.0+ only
OVERNIGHT FLOWER 오버나이트 플라워	P*Light	Present	
Legendary Dominion 레전더리 도미니언	Laur	Present	Premium-exclusive
Passacaglia II 파사칼리아 2	SYNTHWULF		Version 1.03.0+ only.
ELEVATE 엘러베이트	Jorts		Version 1.03.0+ only. (First appearance in Pump It Up R!SE version 1.6.0). ELEVATE is a joint 1st place song of the 5th ANDAMIRO Contests Creation Contest.
PHYSALIS 피살리스	TAG	Present	Version 1.02.0+ only. (First appearance in Pump It Up R!SE version 0.4.1) PHYSALIS is the lengthiest or longest regular song in the Pump It Up series at 2 minutes and 45 seconds, and the longest Premium Mode song as of Pump It Up Phoenix 2, beating QUATTUROUX by 10 seconds. Premium-exclusive
L (PIU Edit)	Ice	Present	Version 1.01.0+ only (First appearance in Pump It Up R!SE (version 0.8.1) Premium-exclusive
Bamboo 뱀부	RISH feat. Choko		Version 1.03.0+ only. (First appearance in Pump It Up R!SE version 0.4.1)
Can I friend you on Bassbook? lol 베이스라인 하고있니? ㅋ	Camellia & Nanahira	Present	Version 1.01.0+ only (First appearance in Pump It Up R!SE (version 0.4.2) Can I friend you on Bassbook? lol marks Masaya Oya's debut in the Pump It Up series.
Crash-Landing Rendezvous 크래쉬 랜딩 랑데부	Xyris	Present	First appearance in Pump It Up R!SE (version 0.5.1) Crash-Landing Rendezvous is the first Pump It Up R!SE song to be crossed over to the main Pump It Up series.
ULTRA SYNERGY MATRIX 울트라 시너지 매트릭스	Tanchiky		Version 1.03.0+ only. (First appearance in Pump It Up R!SE version 1.3.0) ULTRA SYNERGY MATRIX is sequel to ENERGY SYNERGY MATRIX from Pump It Up Phoenix
Quattuorux 콰투오룩스	D-D-Dice vs. Tanchiky vs. Karameru	Present	Quattuorux was available in the early access version of Pump It Up Phoenix 2. Premium-exclusive
NightTheater 나이트시어터	*wakadori	Present	
INFiNiTE ENERZY -Overdoze- 인피니트 에너지 -Overdoze-	Reku Mochizuki	Present	
ASSAULT TAXI 어썰트 택시	∀S∀ (ASA)	Present	Version 1.02.0+ only (first appearance in Pump It Up R!SE version 0.7.1).
FREEDOM DiVE 프리덤 다이브	xi	Present	FREEDOM DiVE was available in the early access version of Pump It Up Phoenix 2. FREEDOM DiVE is a crossover song from Chrono Circle
Dreamchasers 드림체이서즈	s-don	Present	Dreamchasers is a crossover song from Chrono Circle.
SUPER☆HARAGURO☆POP 슈퍼☆하라구로☆팝	Zekk	Present	SUPER☆HARAGURO☆POP is a crossover song from Chrono Circle. SUPER☆HARAGURO☆POP was available in the early access version of Pump It Up Phoenix 2.

Upcoming Songs
Song Title (English/Korean)	Artist	Notes
I Did It 아이 디드 잇	AxMxP	I Did It appears in Pump It Up Phoenix 2's opening demo loop.
Strawberry Rush 스트로베리 러쉬	Chuu	Strawberry Rush appears in Pump It Up Phoenix 2's opening demo loop.
BUBBLE GUM	Kep1er	
Aleph-0 알레프 제로	LeaF & Optie	First appearance in Pump It Up R!SE version 0.7.1+. Aleph-0 was shown in the teaser for Pump It Up Phoenix 2.
Embrace of Zephyr 임브레이스 오브 제퍼	Essbee	Embrace of Zephyr was shown in the teaser for Pump It Up Phoenix 2.
Víðarr	LucaProject & Glancia	Víðarr is a joint 2nd place song of the 5th ANDAMIRO Contests Creation Contest.
NEXT//PHASE	TAG	NEXT//PHASE is a joint 3rd place song of the 5th ANDAMIRO Contests Creation Contest. NEXT//PHASE shares melodies with TAG's BEMANI songs: "Riot of Color", "STERLING SILVER", and "Another Phase".
Dual Chaosmare	rein jack vs. Musanuriyu	Dual Chaosmare is a joint 4th place song of the 5th ANDAMIRO Contests Creation Contest.
Find Yourself feat Shimonz Topaz	Palami vs. j4ckch10sh1	Find Yourself feat Shimonz Topaz is a joint 4th place song of the 5th ANDAMIRO Contests Creation Contest.
IGNYX::{CENTAUREA}	rainstarr a.k.a Foodbot	IGNYX::{CENTAUREA} is a joint 4th place song of the 5th ANDAMIRO Contests Creation Contest.
KAMIKAZE SPEAR	Kumamin & KAH	KAMIKAZE SPEAR is a joint 4th place song of the 5th ANDAMIRO Contests Creation Contest.
N4RO_ANAS!S	TRiNiTUM (tkqn14 + NIKANON) X REVERiE	N4RO_ANAS!S is a joint 4th place song of the 5th ANDAMIRO Contests Creation Contest.
patoꓘoftis	DRLDMFKR	patoꓘoftis is a joint 4th place song of the 5th ANDAMIRO Contests Creation Contest.
「白跡」	Springhead	「白跡」 is a joint 4th place song of the 5th ANDAMIRO Contests Creation Contest.

=== R!SE (2025) ===
Songs present in both R!SE and the arcade series as of Phoenix 2
Song title	Artist	Notes
Cynical	RiraN ft. Negoto Bunnyla	
Rise Up (feat. Miori Celesta)	Memme	
Ercitite	Doin x neur6sia	
King's Tomb	r300k	King's Tomb is a sequel to Scorpion King from Pump It Up PRIME.
Dizzy Dance, Street Light	WyvernP feat. Chobom1221	
Unfelicitas	Fiverwater	
Pull me up (Feat. Monya)	Applesoda	Pull me up (Feat. Monya) is a different lyrics version of "You Raise Me Up" by Secret Garden, composed by Brendan Graham and Rolf Løvland, which was, in turn, popularized in cover versions by most notably Josh Groban and Westlife.
Antique Serenade	Abel	
We Love Your Step	EmoCosine	
Lucky Star	INFX feat. Miori Celesta	Lucky Star is the first new song by INFX, rebranded from "HyuN".
Transmission	Sakuzyo	Transmission was added on July 29th, 2025.
Chess and Chase	litmus* ft. CielA	Chess and Chase was added on July 29th, 2025.
Sylaphz	onoken	Sylaphz was added on August 28th, 2025. (version 0.4.1)
Pastry mix	Sobrem	Pastry mix was added on September 25th, 2025. (version 0.4.1)
Love Witch	SHK	Love Witch was added on November 27th, 2025. (version 0.5.1)
Galactic Metronome	Essbee	Galactic Metronome was added on October 30th, 2025. (version 0.4.2)
Under the Christmas Stars	MAX	Under the Christmas Stars was added on December 17th, 2025. (version 0.6.1)
Skybound	Yamajet	Skybound was added on September 25th, 2025. (version 0.4.1)
DROP FRONT!ER	xi	DROP FRONT!ER was added on November 27th, 2025. (version 0.5.1)
Morrighan	ryhki	Morrighan was added on December 17th, 2025. (version 0.6.1)
Galactic Terminus	Reku Mochizuki	Galactic Terminus was added on January 15th, 2026. (version 0.7.1)
The Last Stand	3R2	The Last Stand was added on January 15th, 2026. (version 0.7.1)
The Deconstruction	Hommarju	The Deconstruction was added on February 12th, 2026 (version 0.8.1)
Reincarnate in "A"	TAG underground overlay	Reincarnate in "A" was added on August 28th, 2025. (version 0.4.1) Reincarnate in "A" is related to "Over the "Period"" from DanceDanceRevolution (2014).
Burning SuperNova feat. neur6sia	Palami	Burning SuperNova feat. neur6sia was added on October 30th, 2025. (version 0.4.2)
untitled	Apollo program & NOMA ft. Hana Kagenui & K	untitled was added on October 29th (ver 1.6.0)
Time Wanderer	uma	Time Wanderer was added on April 23rd, 2026 (version 1.1.0)
Whitemare	Apo11o program ft. ChumuNote	Whitemare was added on April 23rd, 2026 (version 1.1.0)
Eagle Strike	kanone	Eagle Strike was added on September 17th, 2026 (version 1.5.0)

Songs exclusive to R!SE
Song title	Artist	Notes
Haruyoiuta	DJ Noriken	Haruyoiuta was added on March 26th, 2026 (version 1.0.0)
Elysianic	SHK	Elysianic was added on March 26th, 2026 (version 1.0.0)
One Last Breath	Tsukasa feat. Risa Yuzuki	One Last Breath was added on March 26th, 2026 (version 1.0.0)
Yellow Dot	AJURIKA	Yellow Dot was added on March 26th, 2026 (version 1.0.0)
Love Code	Cashew feat. Hanana	Love Code was added on March 26th, 2026 (version 1.0.0)
Gamma	Ice	Gamma was added on March 26th, 2026 (version 1.0.0)
InviNSible Colour	NOMA	InviNSible Colour was added on March 26th, 2026 (version 1.0.0) InviNSible Colour is NOMA's first new song after the song BRAIN POWER which released from Pump It UP XX ver. 2.05.
Behind the Scenes	t+pazolite	Behind the Scenes was added on March 26th, 2026 (version 1.0.0)
HIGHROLLER	Blacklolita	HIGHROLLER was added on March 26th, 2026 (version 1.0.0)
Fading Night	PIKASONIC	Fading Night was added on March 26th, 2026 (version 1.0.0)
CLUTTERCORED	SANY-ON	CLUTTERCORED was added on March 26th, 2026 (version 1.0.0)
wanna go to the moon palace	MYUKKE.	wanna go to the moon palace was added on March 26th, 2026 (version 1.0.0)
Rave Battle! VS BASTET!	Jehezukiel	Rave Battle! VS BASTET! was added on March 26th, 2026 (version 1.0.0)
Kraken	NeLiME	Kraken was added on March 26th, 2026 (version 1.0.0)
Fluorescent Cruising	ginkiha	Fluorescent Cruising was added on March 26th, 2026 (version 1.0.0)
Lethal Spade	Xyris	Lethal Spade was added on March 26th, 2026 (version 1.0.0)
Delusion	D_AAN	Delusion was added on March 26th, 2026 (version 1.0.0)
The De[i]fied	ARForest	The De[i]fied was added on March 26th, 2026 (version 1.0.0)
Pop & Pump & DIVE!!	ESPITZ & WONDERTRAVELER Project	Pop & Pump & DIVE!! was added on March 26th, 2026 (version 1.0.0)
Diary (feat. NC.A)	INFX & MIIM	Diary (feat. NC.A) was added on March 26th, 2026 (version 1.0.0)
Pathfinder	Xyris	Pathfinder was added on March 26th, 2026 (version 1.0.0)
Into the PIUniverse	Cashew	Mixes Galactic Metronome, Tales of Pumpnia, Heart Rabbit Coaster, We Love Your Step, Kimchi Fingers, Arcana Force.
Entrance (PIU Edit)	Ice	Entrance (PIU Edit) was added on July 29th, 2025. (version 0.4.1)
Conflict -NOMA CONCEIVER REMIX-	NOMA	Conflict -NOMA CONCEIVER REMIX- was added on February 12nd, 2026. (version 0.8.1) Conflict -NOMA CONCEIVER REMIX- is a NOMA remixed version from Cranky's the same song Conflict -NOMA CONCEIVER REMIX- is a crossover song from Chrono Circle
Save Yourself	litmus* ft. Miori Celesta	Save Yourself was added on December 17th, 2025. (version 0.6.1)
MYTH Re：LEASE	D-D-Dice Vs. Tanchiky Vs. uma Vs. Morimori Atsushi	MYTH Re：LEASE was added on June 25th, 2026 (version 1.3.0) MYTH Re：LEASE is part of a collaboration songs between D-D-Dice, Tanchiky and other composers, along with QUATTUORUX. MYTH Re：LEASE used samples from Re:End of a Dream.
Fantasia Sonata Destiny	PYKAMIA	Fantasia Sonata Destiny was added on September 17th, 2026 (version 1.5.0)
Stay (TAK Remix)	TAK	These EZ2ON songs are from EZ2ON REBOOT : R COLLABORATION. Added on October 29th (ver 1.6.0)
Say That U	Ruby Tuesday	These EZ2ON songs are from EZ2ON REBOOT : R COLLABORATION. Added on October 29th (ver 1.6.0)
Minus 2	CROOVE	These EZ2ON songs are from EZ2ON REBOOT : R COLLABORATION. Added on October 29th (ver 1.6.0)
Toy War	M2U	These EZ2ON songs are from EZ2ON REBOOT : R COLLABORATION. Added on October 29th (ver 1.6.0)
The Prince of Darkness	M2U	These EZ2ON songs are from EZ2ON REBOOT : R COLLABORATION. Added on October 29th (ver 1.6.0)
Legend of Moonlight	Memme	These EZ2ON songs are from EZ2ON REBOOT : R COLLABORATION. Added on October 29th (ver 1.6.0)
ApolloN	sun3	These EZ2ON songs are from EZ2ON REBOOT : R COLLABORATION. Added on October 29th (ver 1.6.0)
INSTANT Vampire†StartKit^{TM}	Dr.ReB	These EZ2ON songs are from EZ2ON REBOOT : R COLLABORATION. Added on October 29th (ver 1.6.0)
Chaotic Neutral	aran	These EZ2ON songs are from EZ2ON REBOOT : R COLLABORATION. Added on October 29th (ver 1.6.0)
Fallen	Zekk	These EZ2ON songs are from EZ2ON REBOOT : R COLLABORATION. Added on October 29th (ver 1.6.0)
Now Future is Here	Cosmograph	These EZ2ON songs are from EZ2ON REBOOT : R COLLABORATION. Added on October 29th (ver 1.6.0)
TRPNO	Nauts	These EZ2ON songs are from EZ2ON REBOOT : R COLLABORATION. Added on October 29th (ver 1.6.0)
R.F.C. II	ND Lee	These EZ2ON songs are from EZ2ON REBOOT : R COLLABORATION. Added on October 29th (ver 1.6.0)
MAX301	NAOKI underground -Ω-	These EZ2ON songs are from EZ2ON REBOOT : R COLLABORATION. Added on October 29th (ver 1.6.0)
Limbo	Mori†	These EZ2ON songs are from EZ2ON REBOOT : R COLLABORATION. Added on October 29th (ver 1.6.0)
JUSTITIA	Cosmograph vs. Lunatic Sounds (feat. NieN)	These EZ2ON songs are from EZ2ON REBOOT : R COLLABORATION. Added on October 29th (ver 1.6.0)
SUPERGLIDE	Getty	These EZ2ON songs are from EZ2ON REBOOT : R COLLABORATION. Added on October 29th (ver 1.6.0)
Tanaka	RISH feat. Chko	Tanaka was added on October 29th (ver 1.6.0).

=== M (Mobile Edition) Exclusives (October 2019) ===
Song title (English/Japanese/Korean)	Artist	Notes
Red Blossom	MAX	Red Blossom is the arranged version of "Shanghai Alice of Meiji 17" and "Voile, the Magic Library", both from dōjin video game Touhou Koumakyou: The Embodiment of Scarlet Devil.
Novatail	Sound Souler	Version 1.46+ only
Bestest Frenemy!	MYUKKE.	Version 1.37+ only Bestest Frenemy! is one of the finalist songs of the second Pump It Up Contents Creation Contest.
Lifestreaming	Dachs	Version 1.38+ only Lifestreaming is one of the finalist songs of the second Pump It Up Contents Creation Contest.
Never Give Up!	HASEKO feat. A.Dokuga	Version 1.41+ only Never Give Up! is one of the finalist songs of the second Pump It Up Contents Creation Contest.
Parapara☆Atsuku→Dancing2Night パラパラ☆熱く→Dancing2Night	IanMirror	Version 1.38+ only Parapara☆Atsuku→Dancing2Night is one of the finalist songs of the second Pump It Up Contents Creation Contest.
2step Baby	U-ske	Version 1.41+ only 2step Baby is one of the finalist songs of the second Pump It Up Contents Creation Contest.
Quantum Hyperspace	D_AAN	Version 1.38+ only Quantum Hyperspace is one of the finalist songs of the second Pump It Up Contents Creation Contest.
New World	PODA	Version 1.42+ only One of the finalist songs of the second Pump It Up Contents Creation Contest.
Fairy Dash	Ripel	One of the finalist songs of the second Pump It Up Contents Creation Contest.
Dead Soul	Sound Souler	Version 1.47+ only
Réveil α	Sound Souler	Version 1.48+ only

=== PRO (August 2007) ===
Song title (English/Korean)	Artist	Latest appearance (songs marked as "present" are available in the main series)	Notes
!	Onyx	Pump It Up Infinity	
Aliens in Our Midst	Corporation	Pump It Up Pro 2	
Anubis	Banzai	Pump It Up Infinity	
Art City	Virgill	Pump It Up Pro 2	
Be My Friend	Lagoona	Pump It Up Pro 2	
Blow My Mind	Alphadelta	Pump It Up Pro 2	
Boogie Land	Le Bruj	Pump It Up Pro 2	
Chopstix 챱스틱스	Sonic Dimension	Pump It Up Fiesta 2	Chopstix is the remix of "Chopsticks" by Euphemia Allen.
Clockwork Genesis	Inspector K	Pump It Up Infinity	
Coming Out	Playmaker feat. Robin	Pump It Up Infinity	
Dance All Night 댄스 올 나잇	Oscillator X	Pump It Up Prime 2	
Dance Vibrations 댄스 바이브레이션스	Elpis	Pump It Up Prime 2	
Dawn (Perpetual Mix)	KaW	Pump It Up Infinity	Dawn (Perpetual Mix) is the remix of "Dawn" by KaW from In the Groove.
Destiny	Smiley	Pump It Up Pro 2	
DJ Superstar	Oscillator X	Pump It Up Pro 2	
Do What You Wanna Do	Playmaker	Pump It Up Pro 2	
Energizer 에너자이저	ZiGZaG	Pump It Up Prime 2	
Esperanza	KaW	Pump It Up Infinity	
Exotica	Banzai	Pump It Up Pro 2	
Feels Just Like That Night	Eskimo & Icebird feat. Maria Merete	Pump It Up Infinity	
Funk Factory	Money Deluxe	Pump It Up Pro 2	
Groovin' Motion 그루빙 모션	Sonic Dimension	Pump It Up Fiesta 2	
Hasse Mich	Onyx	Pump It Up Infinity	
Heel and Toe 힐 앤 토	KURi-ZiLL	Pump It Up Prime 2	
Incognito	Inspector K	Pump It Up Pro 2	
Infection	Inspector K	Pump It Up Pro 2	
Into My Dream (Note: "Into My Dream (Kaveh Azizi Remix)" in titlecard.)	Lagoona	Pump It Up Infinity	
It's Over Now	Virgill	Pump It Up Pro 2	
July -Euromix-	js14	Pump It Up Pro 2	
Love Eternal	When Machines Dream	Pump It Up Infinity	
Monolith 모노리스	Affinity	Present	
Moonstone	Virgill	Pump It Up Pro 2	
Nightmoves	Playmaker	Pump It Up Pro 2	
Oasis	KaW	Pump It Up Pro 2	
Radius	KURi-ZiLL	Pump It Up Pro 2	
Ra	Banzai	Pump It Up Pro 2	
Re:Rave 리-레이브	KURi-ZiLL	Pump It Up Prime 2	
Riders, Unite!	Andreas Viklund	Pump It Up Pro 2	
Robotix	Kbit	Pump It Up Pro 2	
Round and Round	Eskimo & Icebird	Pump It Up Pro 2	
STOP! & Go	Onyx	Pump It Up Infinity	
Summer ~Speedy Mix~	Smiley	Pump It Up Infinity	
Sunshine	Playmaker	Pump It Up Pro 2	
Take Me Back (Note: "Take Me Back (2007 re-edit)" in titlecard.) 테이크 미 백	KaW	Pump It Up Prime 2	
Take My Time	Alphadelta	Pump It Up Pro 2	
Utopia 유토피아	Smiley	Present	
Virtual Emotion 버철 이모션	Inspector K	Pump It Up Prime 2	
VVV	ZiGZaG	Present	VVV is a sequel to ZiGZaG's songs, "VerTex" from In the Groove and "VerTex^{2}" from In the Groove 2.
Who	KaW	Pump It Up Pro 2	
Xuxa 슈샤	Smiley	Present	
Y2Z	Affinity	Pump It Up Prime 2	
Zodiac	Banzai	Pump It Up Pro 2	
Epilogue	When Machines Dream	Pump It Up Pro 2	
Euphoria	KaW feat. Smiley	Pump It Up Pro 2	
Kitty Cat 키티 캣	Coconut	Present	Kitty Cat was originally planned to be crossed over to Fiesta 2, but it was instead crossed over in Pump It Up XX.
Ladybug 레이디버그	Coconut	Present	
London Bridge	SCI Guyz	Pump It Up Pro 2	London Bridge is a cover of English nursery rhyme, "London Bridge Is Falling Down".
Move It Groove It	KaW feat. Sam I Am	Pump It Up Infinity	
Shooting Star	Coconut	Pump It Up Infinity	
Style On My Speed Dial	Oscillator X	Pump It Up Pro 2	
Tension	Inspector K	Pump It Up Pro 2	
Tribal Style	KaW	Pump It Up Pro 2	

=== PRO 2 (February 2010) ===
Song title (English/Korean)	Artist	Latest appearance	Notes
Accelerator	Nitro	Exclusive	Gauntlet Mode only in Pro 2
All Of The World	-API-	Exclusive	
Allegro Con Fuoco 알레그로 콘 뿌오코	DM Ashura	Present	First part of "Allegro" series of songs by DM Ashura.
Back In Boogie Town	Beat Bender	Exclusive	
Bang The Bass	Wez Devine	Pump It Up Infinity	
Be Alive (Raaban Inc. Mix) 비 얼라이브 (Raaban Inc. Mix)	Stian K	Pump It Up Prime 2	
Beyond the Sky	Pawel Blaszczak	Exclusive	Gauntlet Mode only in Pro 2
Boom Digi Da	Bambee	Exclusive	
Boulafacet	Nightmare	Pump It Up Infinity	
Breathing You In	Zircon Feat. Jillian Goldin	Exclusive	
Chaotic WHITE	DM Ashura vs Enoch	Pump It Up Infinity	
Closer to Heaven	MePuma	Exclusive	
Coalesce	On Slot	Pump It Up Infinity	
Concerto	Sanxion7	Pump It Up Infinity	
Cosmic Unconsciousness	When Machines Dream	Exclusive	
Cowgirl	Bambee	Exclusive	
Crowdpleaser (Drop the Mic Mix)	SGX	Pump It Up Infinity	
Dabbi Doo	Ni-Ni	Exclusive	
Dawgs In Da House	CanBlaster (Miami Style)	Pump It Up Infinity	
Deadbeat Boyfriend (Note: "Deadbeat Boyfriend (Disko Warp Main Mix)" in titlecard.) 데드비트 보이프렌드	Lucky Princess	Pump It Up Fiesta EX version 1.50	Deadbeat Boyfriend was added in Fiesta EX version 1.50 (basic mode and UCS only), but was removed in Fiesta EX version 1.51 due to Disko Warp licensing fiasco.
Disco Punks on Jolt	Blue Stahli	Exclusive	
Don't Don't Go Away (Note: "Don't Don't Go Away (Disko Warp Main Mix)" in titlecard.)	Foxxie	Exclusive	
Dream To Nightmare 드림 투 나이트메어	Nightmare	Present	
Elder God Shrine	E-Racer	Exclusive	
Electrock	Throwdown	Pump It Up Infinity	
EternuS	Sanxion7	Pump It Up Infinity	
Frozen	Celldweller	Exclusive	
Gargoyle 가고일	Sanxion7	Present	
GO! (EK Mix)	DM Ashura	Pump It Up Infinity	
Hanky Panky	Jenny Rom	Exclusive	
Hardkore Atomic	Diclonius Kid	Pump It Up Infinity	
Hardkore of the North 하드코어 오브 더 노스	Diclonius Kid	Present	Hardkore of the North is the remix of "Hardcore of the North" by Digital Explosion from In the Groove.
Haven	SGX	Exclusive	
Hell Flame	Diclonius Kid	Pump It Up Infinity	
I Think I Like That Sound	Kid Whatever	Exclusive	
Ika Uka	Jenny Rom	Exclusive	
I'm Just a DJ	Ekowraith feat. Kyrn	Exclusive	
In The Groove	One Dollar	Exclusive	Gauntlet Mode only in Pro 2
In The Night	Scandalous	Exclusive	
King of the Beats	Throwdown	Pump It Up Infinity	
Lolitabot (Note: "Lolitabot (Cusimo & Co. Speedy Mix)" in titlecard.)	Lolitabot	Exclusive	
Man vs Mountain	Throwdown	Pump It Up Infinity	
Maslo	Vospi	Pump It Up Infinity	
Memory	On Slot	Pump It Up Infinity	
Mind Your Matter	Bjorn Fogelberg	Pump It Up Infinity	
Mission Incredible	Bjorn Lynne	Exclusive	Mission Incredible is the electronic remix of "Theme from Mission: Impossible" by Lalo Schifrin.
Necromancy 네크로맨시	Zircon	Present	
Oh Oh Oh Sexy Vampire (Note: "Oh Oh Oh Sexy Vampire (JUSTiNB's Radio Edit)" in titlecard.)	Fright Ranger	Exclusive	
One Step Higher	MePuma	Exclusive	
Online	Bambee	Exclusive	
Operator	Miss Papaya	Exclusive	
Photosynthesis	Zircon	Exclusive	
Pink Fuzzy Bunnies	Wonderboy	Exclusive	
Playa D' Embossa (I Feel Love)	Paul Sumpter	Exclusive	
Poco Loco	Carlito	Exclusive	
Power Trip	Nostra Cosa	Pump It Up Infinity	
Rainspark 레인스파크	Sanxion7	Pump It Up Prime 2	
Rave Until The Night Is Over 레이브 언틸 더 나이트 이즈 오버	DM Ashura feat. MC Jay and Veronica	Pump It Up Prime 2	
Rave Until The Night Is Over (Cyber Trance Mix)	DM Ashura feat. MC Jay and Veronica	Pump It Up Infinity	Rave Until The Night Is Over (Cyber Trance Mix) is the trance, eurobeat remix of Rave Until The Night Is Over.
Right Back Up	SGX feat. Navi	Pump It Up Infinity	
Rippin' It Up 리핑 잇 업	Future Funk Squad	Pump It Up Prime 2	
Rock Robotic -OSX Mix-	Oscillator X	Exclusive	Rock Robotic -OSX Mix- is the remix of "Rock Robotic" by When Machines Dream.
Rockhill 락힐	Beltaine	Pump It Up Prime 2	
Shine (Breakz Mix)	Oscillator X	Exclusive	
Smart Optics	Damian Turnbull	Pump It Up Infinity	
Smells Like a Chocolate 스멜스 라이크 어 초콜릿	Vospi	Present	
Span	SGX	Pump It Up Infinity	
Star Command 스타 커맨드	Zircon	Present	
Step On It	The DNC	Exclusive	
Supremacy	KaW	Exclusive	
Sweet Senorita	Miss Papaya	Exclusive	
Swing Baby Swing	The DNC	Exclusive	
Swing the House	Elliot Simons	Pump It Up Infinity	
Switchback 스위치백	Celldweller	Pump It Up Prime 2	
Tell Me A Story (Compendium Mix)	SGX	Pump It Up Infinity	
Terminal	Sanxion7	Exclusive	
The Game of Love	Jenny Rom	Exclusive	
The Last Firstborn	Celldweller	Pump It Up Infinity	
The Neon Underground	Oscillator X	Exclusive	
The Next Step	Falling Down	Exclusive	
Tribe Attacker 트라이브 어택커	Hi-G	Present	
UFO Catcher	Initial P	Exclusive	
Unlikely (Stay With Me)	Celldweller	Exclusive	
Wake Up	Kid Whatever	Exclusive	
Wanting You	Ekowraith	Exclusive	
We Are Loud	Dynamedion	Pump It Up Infinity	
Wham Bam Boogie	Bambee	Exclusive	
What Happened 왓 해픈드	Throwdown	Present	
While Tha Rekkid Spinz	DJ Zombie	Exclusive	
X-Rave 엑스 레이브	DM Ashura	Present	X-Rave uses the vocal samples from "Fly Away", by TeddyLoid. X-Rave's "Somebody scream!" vocal sample is taken from "FIRE FIRE" by StripE and "Second Heaven" by Ryu☆, both from Beatmania IIDX 14 GOLD.
You Bring The Rain	Oscillator X	Exclusive	
Z -The New Legend- (Full Song)	DM Ashura	Pump It Up Infinity	Gauntlet Mode only in Pro 2 Added to Arcade Mode in Infinity
Haven (Full Song)	SGX	Exclusive	Gauntlet Mode only in Pro 2
Maslo (Full Song)	Vospi	Pump It Up Infinity	Gauntlet Mode only in Pro 2 Added to Arcade Mode in Infinity
Smells Like a Chocolate (Full Song)	Vospi	Pump It Up Infinity	Gauntlet Mode only in Pro 2 Added to Arcade Mode in Infinity
Star Command (Full Song)	Zircon	Pump It Up Infinity	Gauntlet Mode only in Pro 2 Added to Arcade Mode in Infinity
Esperanza (The Trinity ver.)	KaW	Exclusive	Gauntlet Mode only in Pro 2
Robotix (The Trinity ver.)	Kbit	Exclusive	Gauntlet Mode only in Pro 2
Utopia (The Trinity ver.)	Smiley	Exclusive	Gauntlet Mode only in Pro 2
Zodiac (The Trinity ver.)	Banzai	Exclusive	Gauntlet Mode only in Pro 2

=== Infinity (2013) ===
Song title (English/Korean)	Artist	Latest appearance	Notes
Baroque Virus 바로크 바이러스	Zircon	Present	Baroque Virus is crossed over to Pump It Up Fiesta 2.
Black Maria	DJ Clonepa	Exclusive	Version 1.10+ only
Blow	Future Funk Squad	Exclusive	
Bubblegum Dancer (J-Mi & Midi-D Remix)	Hanna Stockzell	Exclusive	
Creatures ov Deception	rainbowdragoneyes	Exclusive	
Dance (The Way It Moves)	The DNC	Exclusive	
Dance on Fire: Retribution	Magic Hammer	Exclusive	Version 1.10+ only
Destroy	/DJS\	Exclusive	Version 1.10+ only
Devil's Spirit	Zircon	Exclusive	
DIMM_ (Sleep Deprivation Mix)	640x480 Remixed by Wavelength	Exclusive	Version 1.10+ only
Disco Dancer	Matduke	Exclusive	Version 1.10+ only
Dragonfly	Nitro Fun	Exclusive	Version 1.10+ only
Electric 일렉트릭	The DNC feat. Miss Amani	Pump It Up Prime	Electric is crossed over to Pump It Up Fiesta 2.
Elise 엘리제	DM Ashura	Present	Elise is the remix of Ludwig van Beethoven's "Für Elise". Elise is crossed over to Pump It Up Fiesta 2.
Enhanced Reality 인핸스 리얼리티	Matduke	Pump It Up Prime 2	Infinity version 1.10+ only Prime version 1.14.0+ only Prime Japanese Edition version 1.10.0+ only
Ethereality	DM Ashura vs. Sanxion7	Exclusive	Version 1.10+ only
Euphorium	DM Ashura	Exclusive	
Extravaganza Reborn	BanYa Remixed by Wavelength	Exclusive	Remix of Extravaganza from Pump It Up 2nd Dance Floor.
Fallen Angel 폴른 엔젤	DM Ashura ft. Ariel	Present	Fallen Angel is the remix of "Dies irae" from Wolfgang Amadeus Mozart's "Requiem in D minor (K. 626)". Fallen Angel is crossed over to Pump It Up Prime 2 version 1.08.0+.
Finite	Crolul & Rion	Exclusive	Version 1.10+ only
Fresh	Aspektz (Note: "Mr. Thoro" in Pump It Up Infinity version 1.06 and older versions.)	Exclusive	
Further	DJ Bouche feat. EZGi	Exclusive	Version 1.10+ only
Girlz Buttz	Thomas Howard feat. DJ Potato	Exclusive	Version 1.10+ only
got STOLEN?	Vospi	Exclusive	Version 1.10+ only
Hypnosis (SynthWulf Mix) 힙노시스 (SynthWulf 믹스)	BanYa Remixed by SynthWulf	Present	Hypnosis (SynthWulf Mix) is the remix of Hypnosis from Pump It Up 1st Dance Floor. Hypnosis (SynthWulf Mix) is crossed over to Pump It Up Fiesta 2.
Ignis Fatuus (DM Ashura Mix) 이그니스 패터스 (DM Ashura 믹스)	BanYa Remixed by DM Ashura	Present	Ignis Fatuus (DM Ashura Mix) is the remix of Will O' the Wisp from Pump It Up Rebirth. Ignis Fatuus (DM Ashura Mix) is crossed over to Pump It Up Fiesta 2.
Incubator	/DJS\	Exclusive	Version 1.10+ only
Infinitude	Kimsynth	Exclusive	Version 1.10+ only
Invincible	Missill	Exclusive	
Kill Them! 킬 뎀!	Archefluxx & Kesean Beat	Present	Version 1.10+ only Kill Them! is a crossover song from Neon FM. Kill Them! is crossed over to Pump It Up Prime 2 version 1.09.0+.
Last Day Alive	Sanxion7	Exclusive	
Love is a Danger Zone (Cranky Mix) 러브 이즈 어 데인저 존 (Cranky 믹스)	BanYa Remixed by Cranky	Present	Love is a Danger Zone (Cranky Mix) is the remix of Love is a Danger Zone from Pump It Up Rebirth. Love is a Danger Zone (Cranky Mix) is crossed over to Pump It Up Fiesta 2.
Moonshard	Triplestar	Exclusive	Version 1.09+ only
Nervous	Vospi	Exclusive	
Oh My	Astra	Exclusive	Version 1.10+ only
Party 4U (Holy Nite Mix)	Cranky	Exclusive	Party 4U (Holy Nite Mix) is a remastered version of "Party 4U" released back in 1999.
Party All Night	KaW feat. Sam-I-Am	Exclusive	Version 1.10+ only
Passacaglia 파사칼리아	SynthWulf	Present	Remix of the sixth movement (Passacaglia) of George Frideric Handel's "Harpsichord Suite in G minor (HWV 432)" Crossed over to Pump It Up Fiesta 2
Pop The Track 팝 더 트랙	J-Mi & Midi-D feat. Hanna Stockzell	Present	Crossed over to Pump It Up Fiesta 2
Seize My Day 시즈 마이 데이	rainbowdragoneyes	Pump It Up XX	Version 1.10+ only Crossed over to Pump It Up Prime 2 version 1.05.0+
Shadows	Zircon	Exclusive	
Solitary (Sanxion7 Mix)	BanYa Remixed by Sanxion7	Exclusive	Solitary (Sanxion7 Mix) is the remix of Solitary from Pump It Up 3rd S.E. (Season Evolution).
The Ark Sailing Over Truth	Ashley Scared The Sky	Exclusive	
The Best It's Gonna Get	Celldweller	Exclusive	
The Fool	DJ Clonepa	Exclusive	
The Revolution 더 레볼루션	MAX & DOOM	Present	The Revolution is the remix of Frédéric Chopin's "Revolutionary Étude". The Revolution is crossed over to Pump It Up Prime version 1.09.0 and Japanese Edition version 1.05.0.
The Trident ov Power	Magic Hammer	Exclusive	Version 1.09+ only
True	SGX Feat. Sekhret Hush	Exclusive	
Venetian Staccato	Sta	Exclusive	
VV	ZiGZaG	Exclusive	Version 1.10+ only VV is originally from In the Groove 2 where it is titled "VerTex^{2}" instead.
Z -The New Legend-	DM Ashura	Exclusive	Version 1.10+ only
π·ρ·maniac	DM Ashura	Exclusive	Version 1.10+ only
Baroque Virus (Original Ver.)	Zircon	Exclusive	Version 1.10+ only
Cannon X.1 (Original Ver.)	Yahpp	Exclusive	Version 1.10+ only
Enhanced Reality (Original Ver.)	Matduke	Exclusive	Version 1.10+ only (Music Train exclusive)
Passacaglia (Original Ver.)	SynthWulf	Exclusive	Version 1.10+ only (Music Train exclusive)
Baroque Virus (Full Song) 바로크 바이러스	Zircon	Present	Crossed over to Pump It Up XX version 2.04.0+, using original full version
Black Maria (Full Song)	DJ Clonepa	Exclusive	Version 1.10+ only
Blow (Full Song)	Future Funk Squad	Exclusive	Version 1.05+ only
Butterfly (Full Song)	MAX & Rorychesell	Exclusive	Version 1.10+ only Butterfly (Full Song) is the full version of Butterfly from Pump It Up Fiesta EX.
Don't Bother Me (Full Song)	Tashannie	Exclusive	Don't Bother Me (Full Song) is the full version of Don't Bother Me from Pump It Up 3rd O.B.G. Dance Floor.
Electric (Full Song)	The DNC	Exclusive	
Funky Tonight (Full Song)	Clon	Exclusive	Funky Tonight (Full Song) is the full version of Funky Tonight from Pump It Up 1st Dance Floor.
Gargoyle (Full Song) 가고일	Sanxion7	Present	Version 1.06+ only Gargoyle (Full Song) is crossed over to Pump It Up Prime 2 version 2.04.0+.
Jonathan's Dream (Full Song)	MAX & Seorryang	Exclusive	Version 1.10+ only Jonathan's Dream (Full Song) is the full version of Jonathan's Dream from Pump It Up Fiesta EX.
Nervous (Full Song)	Vospi	Exclusive	
Oy Oy Oy (Full Song)	BanYa	Exclusive	Version 1.10+ only (Mission Mode exclusive)
Pop The Track (Full Song)	J-Mi & Midi-D feat. Hanna Stockzell	Exclusive	
Right Back Up (Full Song)	SGX feat. Navi	Exclusive	Mission Mode only in Infinity
Slam (Full Song)	Novasonic	Exclusive	Version 1.10+ only Slam (Full Song) is the full version of Slam from Pump It Up Perfect Collection.
The Ark Sailing Over Truth (Full Song)	Ashley Scared The Sky	Exclusive	
The Last Firstborn (Full Song)	Celldweller	Exclusive	Version 1.10+ only (Mission Mode exclusive)
The Trident ov Power (Full Song)	Magic Hammer	Exclusive	Version 1.10+ only
We Are (Full Song)	Deux	Exclusive	We Are (Full Song) is the full version of We Are from Pump It Up 3rd O.B.G. Dance Floor.
π·ρ·maniac (Full Song)	DM Ashura	Exclusive	Version 1.10+ only
Armakitten 2-X	BanYa Production & Yahpp / KahruNYA	Exclusive	Version 1.05+ only Mixes Turkey March -Minimal Tunes-, Hungarian Dance V, Higgledy Piggledy, Get Up (And Go) and Final Audition Episode 2-X
Blowin' It Up	Future Funk Squad / Kimsynth	Exclusive	Version 1.05+ only Mixes Rippin' It Up and Blow
Dawgs In Da Revolution	MAX & DOOM & Canblaster / k//eternal	Exclusive	Version 1.10+ only Mixes The Revolution and Dawgs In Da House
Destroy Them	/DJS\ & Archefluxx & Kesean Beat / Kimsynth	Exclusive	Version 1.10+ only Mixes Destroy and Kill Them!
Final Audition Infinity	BanYa Remixed by KahruNYA	Exclusive	Version 1.10+ only Final Audition Infinity is a shortened version of BanYa's original full-length mix of Final Audition.
Gargoyle Infinity	Sanxion7	Exclusive	Version 1.10+ only (Mission Mode exclusive)
Mawaru Infinity	TaroNuke & Kimsynth	Exclusive	Version 1.10+ only Mixes Smells Like a Chocolate, Dance Vibrations, Feels Just Like That Night, Blow, Kitty Cat, Hasse Mich, Energizer, Papa Gonzales, Beethoven Virus, Faster Z, Passacaglia, DJ Otada, Moonlight, Overblow, Monkey Fingers, Beat of the War 2, Hello William, Creatures ov Deception, Chimera, Vacuum Cleaner and VVV
Napalmancy	Doin & Zircon / Kimsynth	Exclusive	Version 1.10+ only Mixes Napalm and Necromancy
Wi-Ex-Doc-Vacuum	Yahpp & Doin	Exclusive	Version 1.10+ only Remixed by k//eternal (Uncredited in the game) Mixes Wi-Ex-Doc-Va, Vacuum and Extravaganza Reborn
Beat The Ghost (Shortcut)	BanYa Production	Exclusive	Version 1.05+ only
Bullfighter's Song (Shortcut)	BanYa Production	Exclusive	Version 1.05+ only
Dance on Fire: Retribution (Shortcut)	Magic Hammer	Exclusive	Version 1.09+ only
Dance Vibrations (Shortcut)	Elpis	Exclusive	
Energizer (Shortcut)	ZiGZaG	Exclusive	
Enhanced Reality (Shortcut)	Matduke	Exclusive	
Girlz Buttz (Shortcut)	Thomas Howard feat. DJ Potato	Exclusive	Version 1.10+ only (Music Train exclusive)
Guitar Man (Shortcut)	BanYa Production	Exclusive	
Incubator (Shortcut)	/DJS\	Exclusive	Version 1.09+ only
Kill Them! (Shortcut)	Archefluxx & Kesean Beat	Exclusive	Version 1.06+ only
Love is a Danger Zone (Cranky Mix) (Shortcut)	BanYa Remixed by Cranky	Exclusive	Version 1.10+ only (Music Train exclusive)
Moonshard (Shortcut)	Triplestar	Exclusive	Version 1.10+ only (Music Train exclusive)
Napad	Vospi	Exclusive	Version 1.10+ only
Party 4U (Holy Nite Mix) (Shortcut)	Cranky	Exclusive	Version 1.10+ only (Music Train exclusive)
U Got 2 Know (Shortcut)	MAX	Exclusive	Version 1.10+ only (Music Train exclusive)
What Happened (Shortcut)	Throwdown	Exclusive	
Space Space Shooter	Kick & Punch	None	Cancelled song
Pink Fuzzy Bunnies (Shortcut)	Wonderboy	None	Cancelled song
Infinity K-Pop Remix	45RPM & Bae Chi Gi / Kimsynth	None	Mixes Slightly and No. 3. Infinity K-Pop Remix is a cancelled remix due to both Slightly and No. 3's absence in the series' default arcade songlist. Infinity K-Pop Remix was supposed to be added to both Pump It Up Infinity Version 1.05 and Pump It Up Fiesta 2, but Andamiro declined to add the remix to either version.
Naissance (teig's terrania Mix)	teig	None	Cancelled song Naissance (teig's terrania Mix) is the remix of Naissance from Pump It Up 3rd Dance Floor O.B.G.
"Moonlight" Sonata 3rd Movt.	Cranky	None	Cancelled song "Moonlight" Sonata 3rd Movt. was supposed to be the second classical remix song based on Ludwig van Beethoven's composition of the same name after Moonlight by BanYa from Pump It Up Zero.
D Gang Remix	N/A	None	Cancelled song D Gang Remix is the remix of D Gang from Pump It Up Premiere 3.

== Pump It Up contents creation Contest Songs ==
This is the list of the contest songs, excluding the songs that appeared in both Pump It Up arcade and mobile versions.

=== 2017 Pump It Up Contents Creation Contest ===
Song	Artist	Notes
Violet Stigma	Dr.Reb	
Water Lily	polysha	
Bestest Fam!	MYUKKE.	
Martyrs	PaRang	
緋ノ華忍法帖	八木雄一	
LHC	LV.4	
V.Moonlight	FiverWater	
Burning Ray	Hayata#	
PIU!	立秋 feat.ちょこ	
Concertino	punchh	
Pump up Cinderella Story	こはる。feat.碧 & しなもんしゅがー☆ & 未々子	
new stage	Takuma Tsuda	
bristle grass	plus alpha	
bittersweet	U-ske	
Summer splash	Spar	

=== The 2nd Pump It Up Contents Creation Contest ===
Song	Artist	Notes
Mass Control	yusi	
Appassionata	FiverWater	
-L- Clasico	U-Hey Seta	
Ready For The Madness	RiraN	
Pray	on_OTL	
Jump up! step up! PIU!	u.whichi feat.秣本 瑳羅	
Bystander Knife	Ref.Isep	

=== The 3rd Pump It Up Contents Creation Contest ===
Song	Artist	Notes
FORViDDEN ENERZY	Reku Mochizuki	
resolVe	Half	
Once The Stars Align	Aethral	
BloS2om	BTB	
Flashy King	U hey Seta	
Turkish Madness	Sound Souler	
Glitch	ripeL	
Cry of Pain feat. A Dokuga	いぬみぎ	
Pixel System	D_AAN	

=== The 4th Andamiro Contents Creation Contest ===
Song	Artist	Notes
Emerald	Cashew	
Mizdirection	dirty magiq	
Diabolus	Dokuwaki	
14th posthumous	Fiverwater	
CR[T]CAL	Halv	
reminisce	iMp	
Watch and Learn	Jorts	
Kimagure Attention	Now Field	
404 Not Found	Quree vs HOTTOEBi	
P!xel(現役JK+Connexio)	Rendezvous	
FULLBLAXT EXCEED	Sh.r-Y	
CRASH LANDING!	Starlight Café	
SUPER DUPER COMBO EATER	tn-shi	
Danza Macabra	Vaarzuleth	

=== The 5th Andamiro Contents Creation Music Contest ===
Song	Artist	Notes
WELCOME TO MY WORLD	Essbee	
BEYOND THE HORIZON	Juyeong	
NEXT AREA	NegimaSaya x TaRa	
Hunoni	kakusan.	
Amalgamate	Raimukun	
Satan《すべてを根絶する》	Ryujinn	
LunΛ	TAKIO	
DeaDLiNE II	Dragon_Klub	
F4 T4 LB UR 5T	Nekoribo	
AETHERiON	SAMString	

== In-house artists ==
=== Main Pump It Up series ===
==== Pump It Up Original ====
Artist	Years active	Number of Credited songs	First Appearance
BanYa (Changed its name to BanYa Production after Yahpp left the group in 2006)	1999–2011	131: 86 regular songs (not counting Yahpp and msgoon); 30 remixes; 2 full songs; 13 short cuts	Pump It Up 1st Dance Floor
Yahpp (Former BanYa leader)	1999–2016	57: 34 regular songs (17 songs credited as BanYa, other 17 as Yahpp); 14 remixes; 5 full songs; 4 short cuts	Pump It Up NX
msgoon (Former BanYa member)	1999–2010	12: 1 regular song; 11 remixes	Pump It Up NX Absolute
MAX (Former member of SID-Sound, also composes some songs for EZ2DJ)	2010–present	41: 23 regular songs; 10 remixes; 8 short cuts	Pump It Up 2010 Fiesta
SHK (known from O2Jam)	2010–present	28: 19 regular songs; 18 songs credited as SHK; 1 song credited as Lotze; 2 remixes; 7 short cuts	Pump It Up 2010 Fiesta
Doin	2010–present	50: 18 regular songs; 16 songs credited as Doin; 1 song credited as A.V.; 1 song credited as V.A.; 29 remixes; 1 full song; 3 short cuts	Pump It Up 2010 Fiesta
DM Ashura	2010–2019	17: 13 regular songs; 1 full song; 3 short cuts	Pump It Up Pro 2
SID-Sound (known from O2Jam U)	2011–2017	8: 7 regular songs; 1 short cut	Pump It Up 2011 Fiesta EX
Yak_Won (known from EZ2DJ)	2012–2014	2 regular songs	Pump It Up 2013 Fiesta 2
SQUAR	2012	1 regular song	Pump It Up 2013 Fiesta 2
SynthWulf	2012–present	9: 7 regular songs; 1 remix; 1 short cut	Pump It Up 2013 Fiesta 2 & Infinity
Cranky (known from DJMax)	2012–present	3 regular songs	Pump It Up 2013 Fiesta 2 & Infinity
M2U (known from DJMax)	2014-2019	5 regular songs	Pump It Up 2015 Prime
Warak (known from O2Jam U)	2014-2017	4: 3 regular songs; 1 remix	Pump It Up 2015 Prime
Nato (known from EZ2DJ)	2014–present	20: 13 regular songs; 5 short cuts; 2 remixes	Pump It Up 2015 Prime
Memme (known from EZ2DJ)	2014–present	5 regular songs	Pump It Up 2015 Prime
Paul Bazooka (known from DJMax)	2014-2016	3: 2 regular song; 1 remix	Pump It Up 2015 Prime
CYO Style	2014-2016	2 regular songs	Pump It Up 2015 Prime
Gentle Stick (known from O2Jam U)	2015	2 regular song	Pump It Up 2015 Prime (v1.01)
r300k (known from EZ2DJ)	2015–present	3 regular songs	Pump It Up 2015 Prime
Cashew	2015–present	6: 5 regular songs; 1 remix	Pump It Up 2015 Prime
Cosmograph	2017–present	7 regular songs: 4 songs credited as Lunatic Sounds; 3 songs credited as Cosmograph	Pump It Up 2017 Prime 2
Monstdeath	2019-present	4 regular songs	Pump It Up XX

==== K-Pop ====
Artist	Years active	Number of credited songs	First appearance
Clon	1999-2001	8: 4 regular songs; 3 remixes; 1 full song	Pump It Up 1st Dance Floor
Novasonic	1999-2003	8: 5 regular songs; 3 remixes	Pump It Up 1st Dance Floor
Sechskies	1999-2000	6: 3 regular songs; 3 remixes	Pump It Up 1st Dance Floor
Deux	2000-2001	6: 3 regular song; 2 remixes; 1 full song	Pump It Up 3rd O.B.G. Dance Floor
DJ DOC	2000-2006	5: 4 regular songs; 1 remix	Pump It Up 3rd O.B.G. Dance Floor
Tashannie	2000	3: 1 regular song; 1 remix; 1 full song	Pump It Up 3rd O.B.G. Dance Floor
Taiji Boys	2000-2008	10: 8 regular songs; 2 full songs	Pump It Up Perfect Collection
Crash	2004-2011	6: 3 regular songs; 1 remix; 2 full songs	Pump It Up Exceed
Som2	2004	4: 2 regular songs; 1 remix; 1 full song	Pump It Up Exceed 2
WAX	2004	2: 1 regular song; 1 full song	Pump It Up Exceed 2
Epik High	2006-2014	4: 2 regular songs; 1 remix; 1 full song	Pump It Up NX
Bae Chi Gi	2008-2012	5: 3 regular songs; 1 remix; 1 full song	Pump It Up NX2
BigBang	2008-2017	13: 6 regular songs; 3 remixes; 3 full songs; 1 alternate version	Pump It Up NX Absolute
2NE1	2010-2017	8: 4 regular songs; 1 remix; 3 full songs	Pump It Up 2010 Fiesta
Kara	2010–2013	6: 3 regular songs; 3 full songs	Pump It Up 2010 Fiesta
Norazo	2011–2023	6: 4 regular songs; 1 remix; 1 cancelled full song	Pump It Up 2011 Fiesta EX
Outsider	2011-2017	5: 3 regular songs; 2 full songs	Pump It Up 2011 Fiesta EX
Orange Caramel	2011–2016	5: 2 regular songs; 2 full songs; 1 remix	Pump It Up 2011 Fiesta EX
Dreamcatcher	2017–2023	9: 6 regular songs; 3 full songs	Pump It Up 2017 Prime 2
Seventeen	2019–2023	3: 2 regular songs; 1 full song	Pump It Up XX: 20th Anniversary Edition
(G)I-dle	2019–present	5: 4 regular songs; 1 full song	Pump It Up XX: 20th Anniversary Edition
Everglow	2020–present	3: 3 regular songs	Pump It Up XX: 20th Anniversary Edition
Ive	2023–present	3: 3 regular songs	Pump It Up Phoenix

==== World Music ====
Artist	Years active	Number of credited songs	First appearance
Big Metra	2008	4: 1 regular song; 1 remix; 2 full songs	Pump It Up NX Absolute
Nina Pilots	2008-2010	4: 2 regular songs; 1 remix; 1 full song	Pump It Up NX Absolute
PXNDX	2008-2012	7: 3 regular songs; 1 remix; 2 full songs; 1 short cut	Pump It Up NX Absolute
Matduke	2013–present	4: 2 regular songs; 2 short cuts	Pump It Up Infinity
3R2 (known from Cytus)	2015	2 regular song	Pump It Up 2015 Prime

==== J-Pop ====
Artist	Years active	Number of credited songs	First appearance
Tatsh (Known from Konami's BEMANI games such as Dance Dance Revolution & beatmania IIDX)	2015-2018	8 (2 song credited as Tatsh, other 5 as TatshMusicCircle): 7 regular songs; 2 full song	Pump It Up 2015 Prime Japanese Edition
Last Note.	2015	4 regular songs	Pump It Up 2015 Prime Japanese Edition
Sakuzyo	2016-present	2 regular songs	Pump It Up 2015 Prime Japanese Edition
Sobrem	2023-present	3: 2 regular song; 1 short cut	Pump It Up 2023 Phoenix

=== PRO series ===
Artist	Years active	Number of credited songs	First appearance
Elpis	2007	2: 1 regular song; 1 short cut	Pump It Up Pro
Kyle Ward (known from In the Groove)	2007-2010	30: 29 regular songs; 5 songs credited as Banzai; 5 songs credited as Inspector K; 9 songs credited as KaW; 1 song credited as KaW feat. Smiley; 2 songs credited as Kbit; 5 songs credited as Smiley; 2 songs credited as ZiGZaG; 1 short cut (credited as ZiGZaG)	Pump It Up Pro
Oscillator X	2007-2010	8: 7 regular songs; 1 remix	Pump It Up Pro
Sonic Dimension	2007	3: 2 regular songs; 1 remix	Pump It Up Pro
Canblaster	2010	7 regular songs: 1 song credited as CanBlaster (Miami Style); 3 songs credited as Diclonius Kid; 1 song credited as Hi-G; 2 songs credited as Nightmare	Pump It Up Pro 2
Celldweller	2010-2013	5 regular songs	Pump It Up Pro 2
Future Funk Squad	2010-2013	4: 2 regular songs; 1 remix; 1 full song	Pump It Up Pro 2
Sanxion7	2010-2013	8: 7 regular songs; 1 full song	Pump It Up Pro 2
SGX	2010-2013	8: 6 regular songs; 2 full songs	Pump It Up Pro 2
The DNC	2010-2013	5: 4 regular songs; 1 full song	Pump It Up Pro 2
Throwdown	2010	5: 4 regular songs; 1 short cut	Pump It Up Pro 2
Vospi	2010–present	7: 4 regular songs; 3 full songs	Pump It Up Pro 2
Zircon	2010–present	10: 8 regular songs; 2 full songs	Pump It Up Pro 2

== See also ==
- Pump It Up (video game series)
- BanYa
