= List of arcade video games: I =

This is a list of arcade video games organized alphabetically by name. It does not include PC or console games unless they were also released in video arcades. See Lists of video games for related lists.

Title	Alternate Title(s)	Year	Manufacturer	Genre(s)	Max. Players	PCB Model
I'm Sorry	Gonbee no I'm Sorry ^{JP}	1985	Coreland	Maze	2	
I, Robot	—	1984	Atari	Shooter	2	
Ibara	—	2005	CAVE	Scrolling shooter	2	
Ibara Kuro: Black Label	—	2006	CAVE	Scrolling shooter	2	
Ichidant-R - Puzzle & Action	—	1994	Sega			
Idol Janshi Suchie-Pai 3	—	1999	Jaleco			NAOMI cart.
Idol Janshi Suchie-Pai II	—	1994	Jaleco			
Idol Janshi Suchie-Pai Special	—	1993	Jaleco			
Idol Mahjong Final Romance	—	1991	Video System			
Idol Mahjong Housoukyoku	—	1988	System Service			
Iemoto	—					
IGMO	—					
Ikari Warriors	Ikari^{JP}	1986	SNK	Run and gun	2	
Ikari Warriors III: The Rescue	—	1989	SNK		2	
Ikaruga	—	2001	Treasure	Scrolling shooter	2	
Ikki	Farmers Rebellion ^{US} Boomerang	1985	TOSE	Action	2	
Illvelo	—	2001	MileStone			NAOMI cart.
Image Fight	—	1988	Irem	Scrolling shooter	2	
Imago	—	1983	Acom			
Imekura Mahjong	—	1994	Phoenix	Mahjong video game		
Imola Grand Prix	—	1981	Leante Games			
In the Groove	—	2004	Roxor Games			
In the Groove 2	—	2004				
In the Hunt	Kaitei Daisensou^{JP}	1993	Irem	Scrolling shooter	2	
Indian Battle	—					
Indiana Jones and the Temple of Doom	—	1985	Atari Games	Action	2	
Indoor Soccer	American Soccer^{JP}	1985		Sports		
Indy 4	—	1976	Atari	Racing	4	
Indy 500: Indianapolis Motor Speedway	—	1995	Sega	Racing	2	
Indy 800	—	1975	Atari	Racing	8	
Inferno (Meadows Games)	—	1977	Meadows Games		2	
Inferno (Williams)	—	1984	Williams		2	
Initial D Arcade Stage	—	2002	Sega	Racing		
Initial D Arcade Stage 4	—	2006	Sega	Racing		
Initial D Arcade Stage Ver. 3	—	2004	Sega	Racing		
Initial D Arcade Stage Ver. 2	—	2002	Sega	Racing		
Initial D The Arcade	頭文字D THE ARCADE	2021	Sega	Racing	4	ALLS MX2.1
Inquizitor	—	1989	Bell-Fruit			
Insector X	—	1989	Taito	Scrolling shooter	1	
Interceptor	—					
Interstellar Laser Fantasy	—	1983	Funai			
Intrepid	—	1983	Nova Games	Platformer	2	
Intruder	Space Laser	1979	Taito, Game Plan			
Inu no Osanpo	—	2001	Sega			NAOMI cart.
Invader's Revenge	—	1979	Zenitone Microsec	Fixed shooter	2	
Invasion: The Abductors	—	1999	Midway		2	
Invinco	—	1979	Sega	Fixed shooter	2	
IPM Invader	—	1979	Irem	Fixed shooter	2	
IQ Pipe	—	1991	AMT			
IQ-Block	—	1993	IGS			
Iron Fortress	—	1998	Eolith			
Iron Horse	Dai Ressya Goutou^{JP}	1986	Konami	Platformer	2	
Ironman Ivan Stewart's Super Off-Road	—	1989	Leland	Racing	3	
Ironman Ivan Stewart's Super Off Road Track Pak	—	1989	Leland	Racing	3	
Istrebiteli	—	198?	Terminal			
Itazura Tenshi	—	1984	Nichibutsu	Multidirectional shooter		
Iwatani Tenhoo no Mahjong Comic Gekijou Vol. 1	—	1991	Dynax			
