= WPF =

WPF may refer to:

== Computing ==
- WebSphere Partition Facility, an IBM facility
- Windows Presentation Foundation, a programming framework for creating user-interfaces in applications for Microsoft Windows

== Sports and games ==
- Women's Professional Fastpitch, professional women's softball league
- World Pickleball Federation
- World Pump It Up Festival, an annual competition/event on the dance game Pump It Up

== Other ==
- Western People's Front, a political party in Sri Lanka, active in the Western Province
- Wolf Preservation Foundation, an international non-profit organisation
- World Population Foundation, founded in 1987 in the Netherlands
