= Roxor Games =

American video game software company

Roxor Games, Inc.
- Roxor Games Logo
- Company type: Private
- Founded: 2002; 24 years ago
- Fate: Unknown Status
- Headquarters: Austin, Texas
- Products: Tux Racer Arcade; In The Groove; Road Rebel

Roxor Games, Inc. was a 25-person company based in Austin, Texas that develops video game software for the arcade and home markets. Founded in 2002, Roxor works with developers of open source software to deploy games on a Linux-based hardware platform in the arcade and on multiple home consoles. Although their most well known product, In The Groove, is proprietary software, the developers regularly contribute code back to the open source project StepMania upon which In The Groove is based.

== Products ==
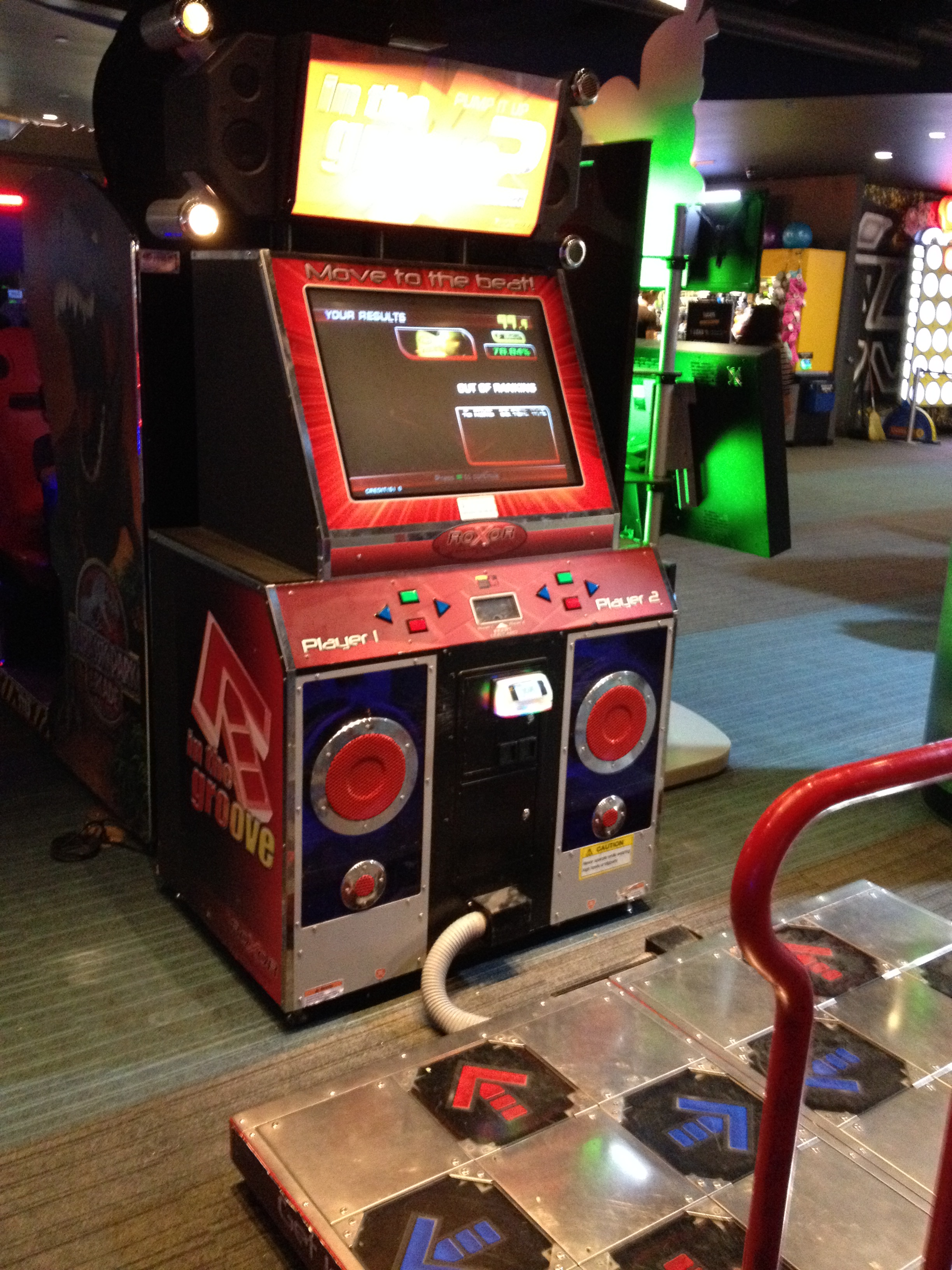
In the Groove arcade cabinet at West Edmonton Mall

Their first product was an arcade redemption version of Tux Racer, where tickets are dispensed based on how well the player collects fish while guiding Tux (the Linux penguin mascot) down one of four snow-covered hills. The sequel, Tux 2, featuring new characters and levels, was in market testing.

Their second product was In The Groove, a series of games in the arcade dance game genre. Following the well-established practice of converting arcade systems via kits, Version 1.0 of In The Groove was released as an upgrade kit for existing arcade dance cabinets. Roxor Games then developed a PlayStation 2 version of In The Groove, which was the first game ever published by RedOctane in June 2005. In The Groove: PC/Mac was released in July 2006.

Pump It Up: In The Groove 2 was released in June 2005 both as an upgrade kit and in a dedicated cabinet manufactured by Andamiro (hence the addition of the Pump It Up name). In The Groove 2 debuted on the arcade earnings chart of Replay Magazine in September 2005, and remained in the top 15 for over 23 months. It hit #1 in February 2006.

However, following a lawsuit from Konami, the maker of Dance Dance Revolution, the series was acquired by them, and development for In The Groove 3 was halted prematurely. Roxor has not produced any rhythm games since, but a group of people who had developed In The Groove (including Kyle Ward and Chris Foy) formed "Fun In Motion" and continued working with Andamiro to produce a spinoff of their existing intellectual property instead, leading to the creation of Pump It Up Pro and its sequels. This group now operates as Step Revolution, LLC.

Roxor's latest product is a driving game titled Road Rebel. It is a multiplayer car combat game featuring support for a wide variety of driving cabinets and network play. Road Rebel will be offered as both an upgrade kit and a dedicated cabinet. It is currently on market test with Namco's arcade division.
