= Rhythm game =

Genre of music-themed action video game

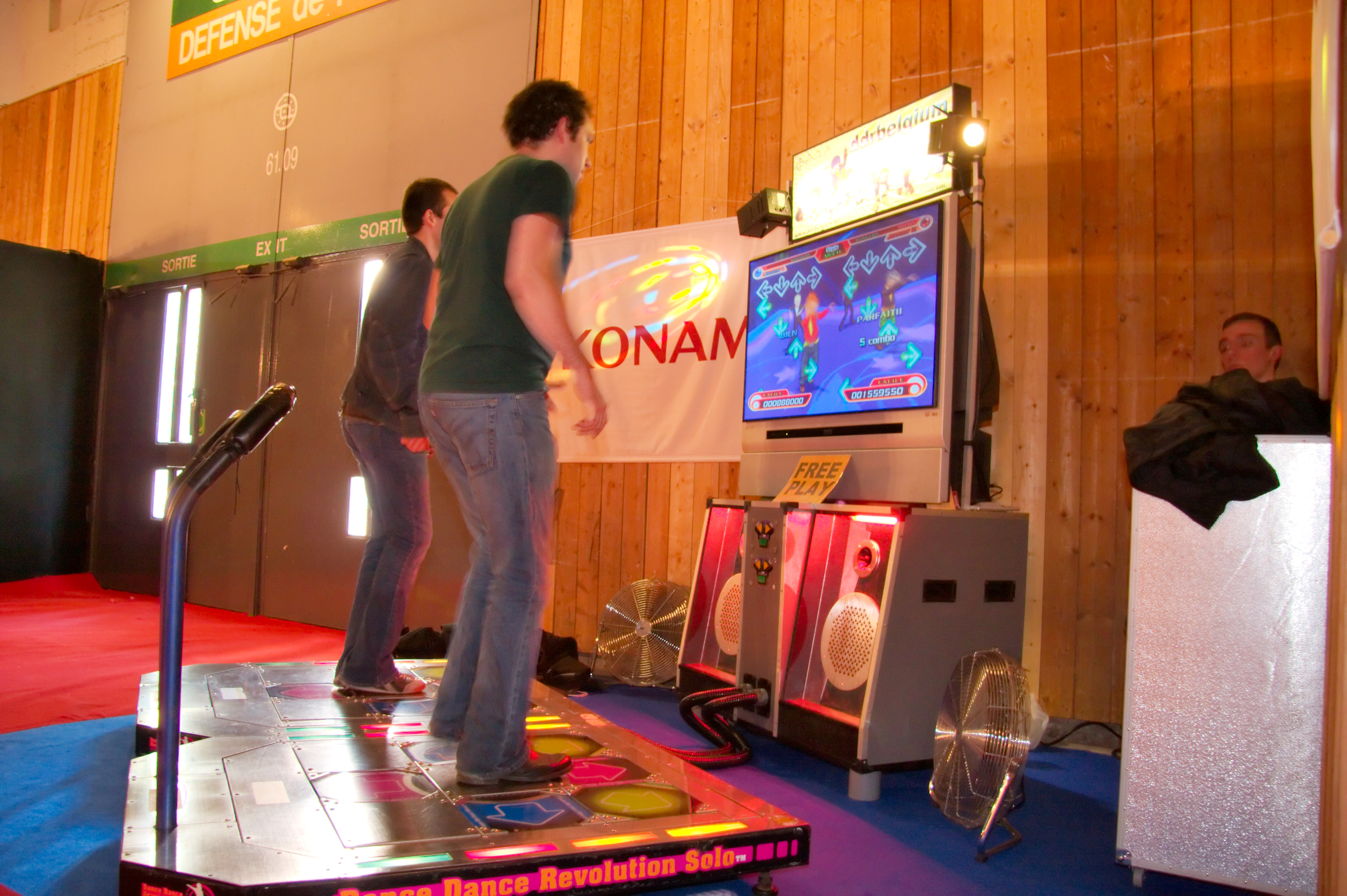
Players using a dance pad to play Dance Dance Revolution, one of the most successful rhythm games

Rhythm game or rhythm action is a genre of music-themed action video game that challenges a player's sense of rhythm. Games in the genre typically focus on dance or the simulated performance of musical instruments, and require players to press buttons in a dictated sequence in time with music. Many rhythm games include multiplayer modes in which players compete for the highest score or cooperate as a simulated musical ensemble. Rhythm games often feature novel game controllers shaped like musical instruments such as guitars and drums to match notes while playing songs. Certain dance-based games require the player to physically dance on a mat, with pressure-sensitive pads acting as the input device.

The 1996 title PaRappa the Rapper has been deemed the first influential rhythm game, whose basic template formed the core of subsequent games in the genre. In 1997, Konami's Beatmania sparked an emergent market for rhythm games in Japan. The company's music division, Bemani, released a series of music-based games over the next several years. The most successful of these was the 1998 dance mat game Dance Dance Revolution, which was the only Bemani title to achieve large-scale success outside Japan, and would see numerous imitations of the game from other publishers.

Other Japanese games, particularly Guitar Freaks, led to development of the Guitar Hero and Rock Band series that used instrument-shaped controllers to mimic the playing of actual instruments. Spurred by the inclusion of popular rock music, the two series revitalized the rhythm genre in the Western Market, significantly expanded the console video game market and its demographics. The games provided a new source of revenue for the artists whose music appeared on the soundtracks. The later release of Rock Band 3 as well as the even later Rocksmith would allow players to play the songs using a real electric guitar. By 2007 rhythm games were considered to be one of the most popular video game genres, behind other action games. However, by 2009, the market was saturated by spin-offs from the core titles, which led to a nearly 50% drop in revenue for music game publishers; within a few years, both series announced they would be taking a hiatus from future titles.

Despite these setbacks, the rhythm game market continues to expand, introducing a number of dance-based games like Ubisoft's Just Dance and Harmonix's Dance Central that incorporate the use of motion controllers and camera-based controls like the Kinect. Existing games also continue to thrive on new business models, such as the reliance on downloadable content to provide songs to players. The introduction of the eighth generation of console hardware has also spurred return of Activision's Guitar Hero and Harmonix's Rock Band titles in late 2015.

== Definition and game design ==
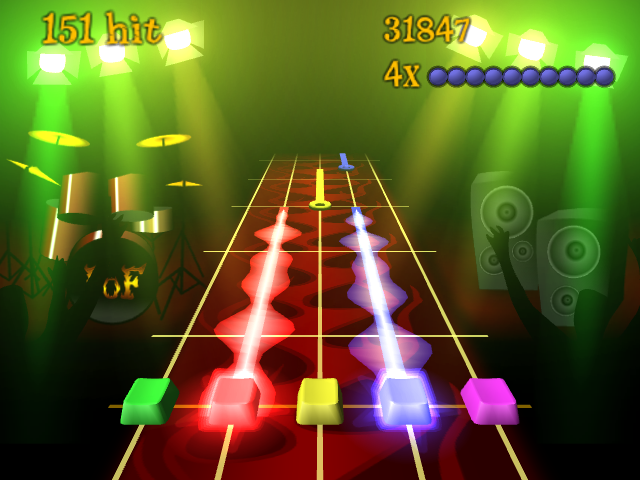
Many rhythm games, such as Frets on Fire, use a scrolling "note highway" to display what notes are to be played, along with a score and a performance meter.

Rhythm game, or rhythm action, is a subgenre of action game that challenges a player's sense of rhythm. The genre includes dance games such as Dance Dance Revolution and music-based games such as Donkey Konga and Guitar Hero. Games in the genre challenge the player to press buttons at precise times: the screen shows which button the player is required to press, and the game awards points both for accuracy and for synchronization with the beat. The genre also includes games that measure rhythm and pitch, in order to test a player's singing ability, and games that challenge the player to control their volume by measuring how hard they press each button. While songs can be sight read, players usually practice to master more difficult songs and settings. Certain rhythm games offer a challenge similar to that of Simon, in that the player must watch, remember, and repeat complex sequences of button-presses. Rhythm-action can take a minigame format with some games blending rhythm with other genres or entirely comprising minigame collections.

In some rhythm games, the screen displays an avatar who performs in reaction to the player's controller inputs. However, these graphical responses are usually in the background, and the avatar is more important to spectators than it is to the player. In single-player modes, the player's avatar competes against a computer-controlled opponent, while multiplayer modes allow two player-controlled avatars to compete head-to-head. The popularity of rhythm games has created a market for speciality input devices. These include controllers that emulate musical instruments, such as guitars, drums, or maracas. A dance mat, for use in dancing games, requires the player to step on pressure-sensitive pads. However, most rhythm games also support more conventional input devices, such as control pads.

== History ==
=== Origins and popularity in Japan (1980s–2000) ===
Human Entertainment's Dance Aerobics was an early rhythm-based video game released in 1987, and allows players to create music by stepping on Nintendo's Power Pad peripheral for the NES video game console. The 1996 title PaRappa the Rapper has been credited as the first true rhythm game, and as one of the first music-based games in general. It requires players to press buttons in the order that they appear on the screen, a basic mechanic that formed the core of future rhythm games. The success of PaRappa the Rapper sparked the popularity of the music game genre. In 1997, Konami released the DJ-themed rhythm game Beatmania in Japanese arcades. Its arcade cabinet features buttons similar to those of a musical keyboard, and a rubber pad that emulates a vinyl record. Beatmania was a surprise hit, inspiring Konami's Games and Music Division to change its name to Bemani in honor of the game, and to begin experimenting with other rhythm game concepts. Its successes include GuitarFreaks, which features a guitar-shaped controller, and 1998's Pop'n Music, a game similar to Beatmania in which multiple colorful buttons must be pressed. While the GuitarFreaks franchise continues to receive new arcade releases in Japan, it was never strongly marketed outside of the country. This allowed Red Octane and Harmonix to capitalize on the formula in 2005 with the Western-targeted Guitar Hero. In general, few Japanese arcade rhythm games were exported abroad because of the cost of producing the peripherals and the resulting increases in retail prices. The 1999 Bemani title DrumMania featured a drum kit controller, and could be linked with GuitarFreaks for simulated jam sessions. Similarly, this concept was later appropriated by Harmonix for their game Rock Band.

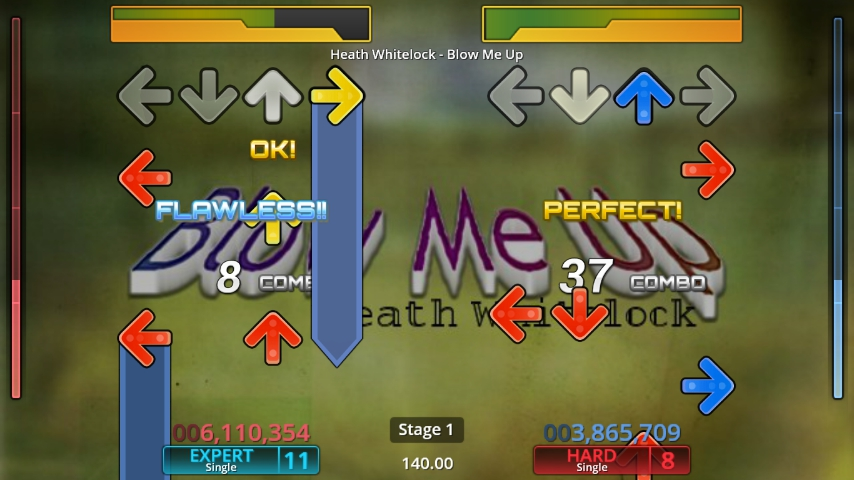
Screenshot of StepMania, an open-source game similar to Dance Dance Revolution

Dance Dance Revolution, released in 1998, is a rhythm game in which players dance on pressure-sensitive pads in an order dictated by on-screen instructions. The game was highly successful both in and outside Japan, unlike games such as GuitarFreaks, DrumMania and Beatmania, though the latter had some success in Europe. Released the same year, Enix's Bust a Groove features a similar focus on dancing but employs a more conventional input method. The game contains competitive one-on-one battles, and grants the player more freedom than typical rhythm games.

NanaOn-Sha, the creators of PaRappa the Rapper, released Vib-Ribbon in 1999. It eschews instrument-shaped controllers; instead, players maneuver the protagonist through an obstacle course by pressing buttons at correct times. The game's levels are generated by the background music, which players may change by inserting audio CDs. While it was praised for its unique style and artistry, Vib-Ribbon's simple vector graphics proved difficult to market, and the game was never released in North America. Sega's Samba de Amigo, released in arcades in 1999 and on the Dreamcast in 2000, features maraca-shaped, motion-sensitive controllers. The game allows for two-player gameplay, provides a spectacle for onlookers and allows players to socialise while gaming. In 2000, Taiko no Tatsujin combined traditional Japanese drums with contemporary pop music, and became highly successful in Japanese arcades. The game was later released on consoles in the West as Taiko Drum Master, and the franchise continues to receive new installments in Japan, as well as console releases around the world. Gitaroo Man featured a guitar-playing protagonist four years before the release of Guitar Hero, though the game employed a conventional rather than guitar-shaped controller.

=== Popularity in the West (2001–2004) ===
Harmonix was formed in 1995 from a computer music group at MIT. Beginning in 1998, the company developed music games inspired by PaRappa the Rapper. In 2001, the company released Frequency, which puts the player in control of multiple instrument tracks. Ryan Davis of GameSpot wrote that the game provides a greater sense of creative freedom than earlier rhythm titles. Frequency was critically acclaimed; however, marketing was made difficult by the game's abstract style, which removed the player's ability to perform for onlookers. In 2003, Harmonix followed up Frequency with the similar Amplitude. The company later released a more socially driven, karaoke-themed music game in Karaoke Revolution (2003). Donkey Konga, a GameCube title developed by Namco and released in 2003, achieved widespread success by leveraging Nintendo's Donkey Kong brand.

=== Peripheral-based games (2005–2013) ===
In 2005, Gitaroo Man's creator Keiichi Yano released Osu! Tatakae! Ouendan, a rhythm game for the Nintendo DS that utilizes the handheld's touchscreen features. It became a highly demanded import title, which led to the release of an altered version of the game in the West—Elite Beat Agents—and a sequel in Japan.

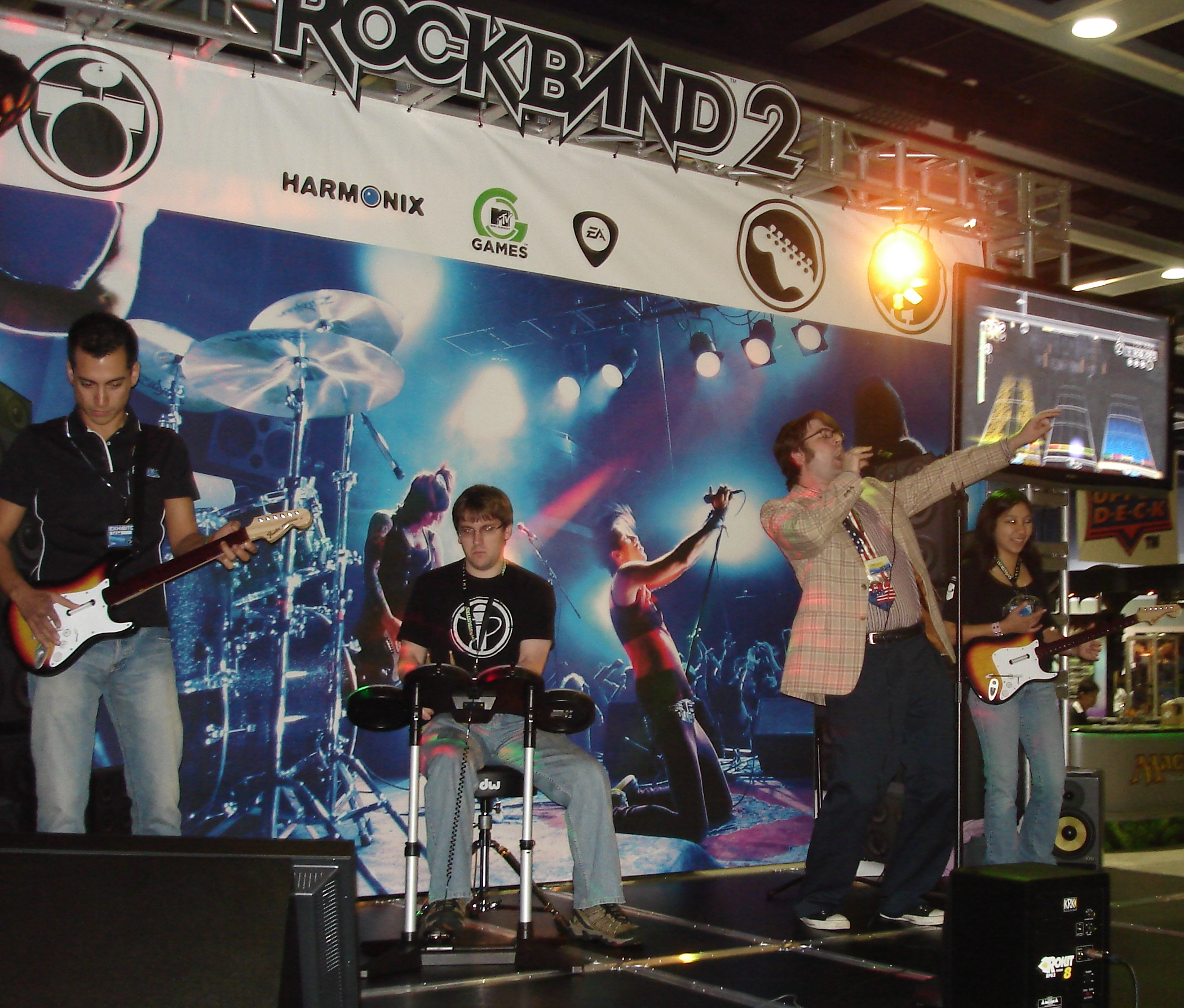
An impromptu group of Rock Band 2 players

Also in 2005, Harmonix and the small publisher RedOctane released Guitar Hero, a game inspired by Bemani's GuitarFreaks. However, instead of the Japanese pop that comprises the earlier title's soundtrack, Guitar Hero features Western rock music. The game reinvigorated the rhythm genre, which had stagnated because of a flood of Dance Dance Revolution sequels and imitations. Guitar Hero spawned several sequels, and the franchise overall earned more than $1 billion, with the third installment ranking as the best selling game in North America in 2007. Harmonix followed Guitar Hero with the Rock Band franchise, which also earned over $1 billion. Rock Band titles support multiple instrument controllers and cooperative multiplayer, allowing players to play as a full band. The Guitar Hero franchise followed suit with the band-oriented, Neversoft-developed Guitar Hero World Tour. Guitar Hero installments based on specific bands, such as Metallica and Aerosmith, were also published. Additional songs for Guitar Hero and Rock Band were made available for purchase via the Internet, which generated further revenue. Artists whose work is featured in the games receive royalties, and the increased publicity in turn generates further sales of their music. The success of the Guitar Hero and Rock Band franchises widened the console video game market and its demographics, and the popularity of the genre drove increased sales of consoles. In 2008, it was reported that music games had become the second most popular video game genre (behind action) in the United States, with 53% of players being female. At its height in 2008, music games represented about 18% of the video game market.

Video game industry analysts considered 2009 to be a critical year for rhythm games, and they believed that it would allow them to gauge the future success of the genre. Both the Guitar Hero and Rock Band franchises were expanded, and they received entries for handheld gaming devices and mobile phones. Specialized titles that targeted specific genres and demographics, such as Band Hero for pop music and Lego Rock Band for younger players, were released. Sales of music games were down in the first half of the year. This decline was attributed to fewer purchases of instrument controllers; it was assumed that players had already bought such controllers and were reusing them. While analysts had expected that United States sales of Guitar Hero 5 and The Beatles: Rock Band would be high—close to or exceeding one million units each in the first month of their release—sales only reached roughly half of those projections. The failure to meet sales projections was partly attributed to the impact of the late-2000s recession on the video game industry; Harmonix's CEO Alex Rigopulos considered that at the time, both Guitar Hero and Rock Band were the most expensive video games on the market. Analysts also considered it to be a sign of market saturation. Further contributing to the decline was genre stagnation; the franchises retained the same basic gameplay over several iterations, giving consumers less incentive to buy additional titles. Harmonix CEO Alex Rigopulos felt that the aggressive competition between the Rock Band and Guitar Hero brands on the belief that the market could only support one franchise also contributed to the decline of these games. As a result, analysts lowered their expectations for future music games; for example, projections of first quarter U.S. sales of DJ Hero, a Guitar Hero "spin-off", were reduced from 1.6 million units to only 600,000. Sales of rhythm games, which totalled $1.47 billion in 2008, reached only $700 million in 2009. Analysts predicted that the market would settle at the same "healthy" $500–600 million level of the Call of Duty series. Wedbush Securities analyst Michael Pachter concluded that the saturation of the rhythm game market accounted for one-third of the industry's 12% sales decline in 2009.

The fallout of the weakening rhythm game market affected game developers, publishers and distributors. Companies in the latter two categories believed that most consumers would own at least one set of instrument controllers by 2010, which would increase the importance of software and downloadable content sales. Activision scaled back its 2010 Guitar Hero release schedule to just two games, reducing the number of SKUs from 25 in 2009 to 10 in 2010. The company closed several in-house developers, including RedOctane, Neversoft's Guitar Hero division, and Underground Development. Viacom, which had paid Harmonix $150 million following the success of Rock Band in 2007, began seeking a "substantial" refund on that investment after weak sales in 2009. Viacom also sought to negotiate new deals with music publishers to reduce the costs of the Rock Band series' licensed music. Ultimately, the company began to seek a buyer for Harmonix during the third quarter of 2010.

In 2010, rhythm game developers included new features in their products. For example, Rock Band 3 and Power Gig: Rise of the SixString support guitar controllers with strings, and both contain modes that teach players accurate fingering. Despite this new content, sales of music games faltered in 2010. Guitar Hero: Warriors of Rock and DJ Hero 2 sold only 86,000 and 59,000 copies, respectively, in North America during their first week on the market. This was in sharp contrast to Guitar Hero III, which had sold nearly 1.4 million units in its first week in 2008. Through October 2010, music games achieved net sales of around $200 million, one-fifth of the genre's revenue during the same period in 2008. Analysts believed that the market likely would not break $400 million in revenue by the end of the year. End year sales were less than $300 million.

By the end of 2010, the instrument controller-based rhythm market was considered "well past its prime", and developers shifted their focus to downloadable content and potential integration with motion control systems. In late 2010, Viacom sold Harmonix to an investment-backed group and allowed it to continue developing Rock Band and Dance Central. Citing the downturn in rhythm games, Activision shuttered their Guitar Hero division in February 2011. Analysts suggested that the market for peripheral-based rhythm games may remain stagnant for three to five years, after which sales could resurge because of digital distribution models or the release of new video game consoles. However, by 2013, the era of peripheral-based music games was considered at an end, as Harmonix announced that it would cease regular updates of Rock Band downloadable content on April 2, 2013, as the company shifts to newer games.

=== Rhythm games for young girls (2004–present) ===
In Japanese amusement arcade, arcade-based collectible card games became popular. In 2004, Sega released Oshare Majo: Love and Berry which was a fashion coordinate game with collectible card game and rhythm game elements. The Oshare Majo was a big hit in Japan and then other game companies also entered in this game genre.

- Sega – Oshare Majo: Love and Berry (2004–2008) and LilPri (2009–2011)
- Taito – KiraKira Idol Rika-chan (2006–2007)
- Atlus – Kirarin Revolution: Happy Idol Life (2006–2009) and Gokujō!! Mecha Mote Iinchō: KuruMote Girls Contest! (2009–2011)
- Tomy – Won!Tertainment Music Channel (2006–2010), Pretty Rhythm (2010–2014), PriPara (2014–2017), Idol Time PriPara (2017–2018), Kiratto Pri Chan (2018–2021), Waccha PriMagi! (2021–2024), and Himitsu no AiPri (2024–)
- Bandai – Pretty Cure: Data Carddass series (2007–2017) and Aikatsu! (2012–)
- Konami – Otocadoll (2015–2022)

Those games have only aimed at young girls, however some of those games also hit at some adults which are often mentioned as "Ōkina otomodachi" (lit. 'Big Friends'). In 2016, as for PriPara, Tomy mentioned that "When all users [of the game] are counted as its main target of from 6 to 9 years old [Japanese] girls, we succeed to expand the market scale as many as every one of the main target" in its financial results.

=== Virtual idol rhythm games (2008–present) ===
Virtual idol rhythm games grew in popularity in Japan out of two different media segments. One was The Idolmaster series of games developed by Bandai Namco Entertainment first released as an arcade game in 2005. Initial games had players taking the role of a manager of rising stars (idols) managing their schedules through mini-games, which include performing in auditions similar to a rhythm game approach. The other direction came from the introduction of the virtual idol of Hatsune Miku by Crypton Future Media for its line of Vocaloid sound synthesis software in 2007. Using Vocaloid, software users could have Miku mimic singing and dancing to the music created in Vocaloid, and many of these videos became popular on the Japanese media sharing site Niconico. The popularity of the Miku's videos led to other similar videos based on other popular characters including those out of the Idolmaster series.

The next Idolmaster game, The Idolmaster Live For You! in 2008, focused more on the performance mini-games, which led for most remaining games of the series to be virtual idol rhythm games. Similarly, as Crypton continue to expand on Miku and other virtual idols for Vocaloid, they expanded to licensing those idols for video games, collaborating with Sega to create the Hatsune Miku: Project DIVA debuting in 2009.

These games were initially mostly for consoles, but mobile game versions of these series appeared in 2012 (Miku Flick for the Miku series) and 2013 (The Idolmaster Shiny Festa), and numerous mobile-based virtual idol rhythm games followed, such as Love Live!, BanG Dream!, Uta no Prince-sama and Ensemble Stars!. Many of these games were freemium games based on existing anime or manga properties, and typically included gacha-type mechanisms to be profitable.

=== Future directions (2010–present) ===
With the introduction of motion controllers for the Xbox 360 (Kinect) and the PlayStation 3 (PlayStation Move) in 2010 and 2011, some analysts stated that the rhythm market would resurge thanks to dance- and band-based games that use platform-agnostic controllers. Dance games such as Ubisoft's Just Dance, Harmonix's Dance Central and Michael Jackson: The Experience were based on new motion sensing technologies. Industry pundits believed that, because sales of peripheral-based music games are lagging and the popularity of pop music is surging, dance-based games would continue to thrive. Just Dance and Dance Central boosted the rhythm genre's late-2010 sales; the latter was the top-selling game for the Kinect in North America in November 2010. Both games helped the genre increase its sales by 38% over November 2009, according to NPD. Harmonix is expected to post more than $100 million in profit for 2011 buoyed by sales of Dance Central and downloadable content for the game, according to Bloomberg. The first Just Dance game (2009) overcame a poor critical reception to topple Call of Duty: Modern Warfare 2's best-seller status, while Just Dance 2 (2010) became the best selling non-Nintendo game for the Wii. The Just Dance series competed with top action franchises for sales. Tap Tap Revenge, the first installment of the iPhone rhythm series Tap Tap, was the platform's most downloaded game in 2008. The Tap Tap franchise ultimately generated 15 million downloads and received a Guinness World Record as the "most popular iPhone game series".

Over the course of 2014, the phenomenon of indie games produced several variations of the genre. The game Jungle Rumble uses a mechanic where players drum on a touch screen to control the game. Different rhythms correspond with different verbs to control entities in an RTS like environment. The game Crypt of the NecroDancer uses a mechanic where the player controls the main character in sync with the soundtrack's beat.

Harmonix returned to its core rhythm games in 2014. In 2014, it successfully funded a Kickstarter campaign to produce a remake of the PS2 title, Amplitude for PlayStation 3 and 4, with release expected in 2015. Further, in March 2015, the company announced Rock Band 4 to be released later in the same year, with plans to keep the game as a platform with continued free and paid updates and downloadable content, while refocusing on the core social and music enjoyment of the game. Activision also announced Guitar Hero Live, slated for late 2015, which rebuilds the game from the ground up, keeping the core mechanics but using a 3-button with dual position controller, and using recorded footage of a rock concert taken from the lead guitarist's perspective to increase immersion. Guitar rhythm game industry is going for the VR market with games like Rocksmith and Rock Band VR.

2016 saw the release of Thumper, a self-styled "rhythm violence" game combining rhythm mechanics with an abstract horror theme and an original industrial soundtrack. Unusually, Thumper features a player character encountering notes as physical obstacles, rather than having notes simply scroll offscreen. Also in 2016, Konami returned to the western arcade market with Dance Dance Revolution A after a successful location test.

In 2017, Step Revolution released StepManiaX, a game similar to DDR and In the Groove, with an additional center panel. The game currently releases monthly updates.

In 2018, Beat Saber, a virtual reality rhythm game designed around cutting colored cubes in time with a song's beat, became the top selling and highest rated virtual reality game on the Steam market at the time of its release.

In 2019, the rhythm genre made its first foray into the first-person shooter genre with Harmonix's AUDICA. This same formula would then be used again for 2019's Pistol Whip, 2020's BPM: Bullets Per Minute and 2022's Metal: Hellsinger.

Harmonix was acquired by Epic Games in 2021, and worked on a new rhythm-based game mode called Fortnite Festival, mimicking the gameplay of Rock Band, released within Epic's Fortnite game platform in 2023. Beside the traditional note-matching gameplay for one to four players, Fortnite Festival features Jam tracks which, similar to Harmonix' Dropmix and Fuser, allows players to mix multitrack tracks from different songs to make their own mashups. Songs are offered for free on a rotating basis, while players can also purchase songs to play at any time through the Fortnite store or as part of the game's battle passes. Though the game initially shipped with only support for normal game controllers or keyboard, later additions brough in support for existing guitar controllers from both Guitar Hero and Rock Band, and new guitar controllers produced by PDP and CRKD.

Based on the success of Fortnite Festival along with community support for Clone Hero and YARG, former members of RedOctane established RedOctane Games under Embracer Group in mid-2025 to create Stage Tour, a new guitar-controller-based rhythm game.

== Health and education ==
Rhythm games have been used for health purposes. For example, research has found that dancing games dramatically increase energy expenditure over that of traditional video games, and that they burn more calories than walking on a treadmill. Scientists have further suggested that, due to the large amount of time children spend playing video games and watching television, games that involve physical activity could be used to combat obesity.

Studies have found that playing Dance Dance Revolution can provide an aerobic workout, in terms of a sufficiently intense heart rate, but not the minimum levels of VO2 max. Based on successful preliminary studies, West Virginia, which has one of the highest rates of obesity and its attendant diseases in the US, introduced Dance Dance Revolution into its schools' physical education classes. According to The New York Times, more than "several hundred schools in at least 10 states" have used Dance Dance Revolution (along with In the Groove) in their curricula. Plans have been made to increase the number into the thousands in an effort to mitigate the country's obesity epidemic. Arnold Schwarzenegger, former Governor of California, was a noted proponent of the game's use in schools.

In Japan, celebrities reported losing weight after playing Dance Dance Revolution, which drove sales of the game's home console version. Bemani's testers also found themselves losing weight while working on the game.

There is further anecdotal evidence that these games aid weight loss, though the University of Michigan Health System has cautioned that dance games and other exergames should only be a starting point towards traditional sports, which are more effective.

Dance games have also been used in rehabilitation and fall-prevention programs for elderly patients, using customised, slower versions of existing games and mats. Researchers have further experimented with prototypes of games allowing wider and more realistic stepping than the tapping actions found in commercial dance games.

MIT students collaborated with the government of Singapore and a professor at the National University of Singapore to create AudiOdyssey, a game which allows both blind and sighted gamers to play together.

=== Guitar Hero and related games ===
Guitar Hero games have been used alongside physical therapy to help recovering stroke patients, because of the multiple limb coordination that the titles require. Researchers at Johns Hopkins University have used Guitar Hero III and its controller to help amputee patients, and to develop new prosthetic limbs for these patients. Researchers at University of Nevada, Reno modified a haptic feedback glove to work with the Guitar Hero freeware clone Frets on Fire, resulting in Blind Hero, a music game for visually impaired players that is played with only touch and audio. Guitar Hero was used as part of a Trent University youth sleep study, which showed that, in general, players who played a song were better at it twelve hours later if that period included normal sleep.

Guitar Hero and Rock Band have introduced people to rock music and inspired them to learn how to play the guitar. A study by Youth Music found that 2.5 million out of 12 million children in the United Kingdom have begun learning how to play real instruments after playing music video games such as Guitar Hero. The group believes that these video games can be incorporated into music educational programs.

Guitar teachers in the US have reported an increase in students who cite Guitar Hero as their inspiration to start learning. On the other hand, industry professionals, such as the inventor of the Fretlight practice tool, have expressed scepticism over the game's educational value. There is anecdotal evidence that Guitar Hero aids rhythm and general hand-coordination, but also that it creates a false preconception of the difficulty of learning guitar, which can lead students to discontinue their studies. Guitar Center conducted a survey which found that a majority of instrument-based rhythm gamers intended to take up a real instrument in the future while a majority of those who were already musicians had been inspired to play their instruments more. Despite such popularity the guitar remains less popular than it was in the 1960s.

Some musicians have been critical of Guitar Hero's impact on music education. Jack White of the White Stripes stated that he was disappointed to learn that video games are the most likely venue where younger audiences will be exposed to new works, while Jimmy Page of Led Zeppelin does not believe that people can learn how to play real instruments from their video game counterparts. Similarly, Prince has turned down opportunities to have his music in the Guitar Hero series, stating that he felt that it was "more important that kids learn how to actually play the guitar". Other commentators have pointed to (including the expanded, lifelike Drum Rocker kit) used in such games as potentially useful in learning and creating music with real drums.

== Sources ==
- Ashcraft, Brian, Arcade Mania! The Turbo-Charged World of Japan's Games Centers (Kodansha International, 2008) ISBN 978-4-7700-3078-8
- Rollings, Andrew & Adams, Ernest, Fundamentals of Game Design (Prentice Hall, 2006) ISBN 978-0-13-168747-9
- Steinberg, Scott, Music Games Rock (Power Play, 2011) ISBN 978-1-105-03295-0
