= In the Groove 2 =

2005 video game

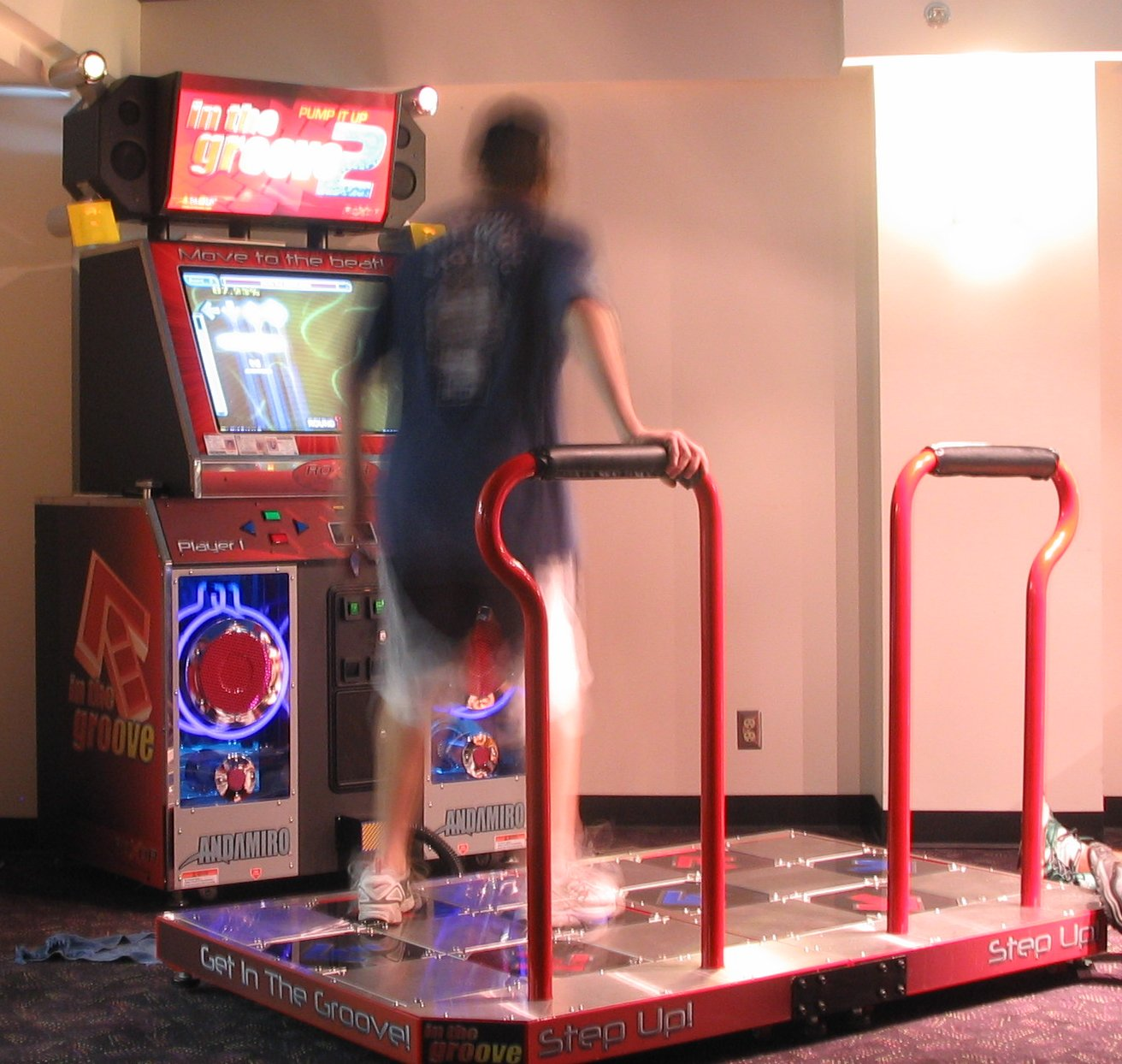
- Developer: Roxor Games
- Publisher: RedOctane
- Platform: Arcade
- Release: June 18, 2005
- Genre: Music
- Modes: Multiple one-player and two-player modes

In the Groove 2 is the sequel to Roxor Games' 2004 arcade game In the Groove. It was released to arcades officially on June 18, 2005. It was available as an upgrade kit and as a dedicated cabinet developed by Andamiro. The price for a dedicated cabinet was $9,999 USD and the upgrade kit (sometimes referred to as a "BoXoR") was US$2,999.

There are a total of 137 songs available in the arcade version. This includes all 72 from the original arcade game, the three new songs in the home version, and 65 brand new songs, four of which are hidden and unlockable.

A lawsuit filed by Konami on May 9, 2005, asked for an injunction against the sale of the upgrade kit version. On October 23, 2006, Konami and Roxor reached an out-of-court settlement, which resulted in Konami acquiring the intellectual property rights to the In The Groove franchise and thus effectively terminating the distribution of the game in North America.

In development, it was known solely as In the Groove 2. On June 18, 2005, Roxor Games officially announced the release of the game, and announced that it would add the name of Andamiro's Pump It Up line, becoming Pump It Up: In the Groove 2. However, "Pump It Up" only appears on the marquee of the dedicated cabinets developed by Andamiro. The name also appears on the title screen of an un-updated Andamiro made cabinet. The name appears nowhere on an upgraded cabinet.

The game also features a modified interface, based on the first version but recolored red and incorporating other changes. The interface also features a new font; the first version used a generic font.

USB memory card support has been expanded on In the Groove 2, with the ability to now install revision updates stored downloaded from the internet saved onto the memory card. Several revisions have been released, most of them adjusting timing windows, fixing sync issues with songs, and fixing other bugs. However, only "r2" machines have the ability to install revision patches. Some early ITG2 machines contain "r1", which does not contain the Machine Update option. The biggest addition of functionality added with the patches was contained in "r21", which added the ability to load custom songs from the memory card.

== New features ==
The Novice difficulty level is a feature added to the home version of In the Groove, carried over to In the Groove 2. On this difficulty level, all songs are rated as ones (including the hardest and fastest songs on other difficulties), and play in Novice mode places a traffic light graphic on the screen that tells players when to step. As always, two players can select different difficulty levels for the same song, but if one selects Novice, then the traffic light always appears instead of the normal backgrounds. It is also worth noting that on ITG2, Novice always forces a constant speed of 120 BPM (a "C120" mod). As a result, since C-mods disqualify scores from appearing on the scoreboards if the song played has pauses or speed changes, those songs will never have any Novice scores saved.

Rolls are a new feature. They look like spiky hold notes and usually come in pairs. The player must continually tap the corresponding arrows until the end of the roll, much like the drum roll notes in Namco's Taiko no Tatsujin. Regardless of the song's speed, rolls must be tapped at least once every 0.3 seconds.

Survival Mode is another course-based gameplay mode. The player must play a five-song course, where each song has a time limit less than the song's length. Time left over after each song is carried over to the next, and missteps deplete the time remaining - time is only added for Fantastics, with no change for Excellents and detractions for anything lower. The life-bar in this mode is not used to determine whether the player passes. Instead, it serves as a visual indicator of how much time is remaining. The game ends when the remaining time is fully depleted.

Fitness Mode is a common home version feature on dance games that is included in the arcade version of ITG2. This gameplay mode allows users to keep track of time spent dancing and calories burned.

Three previously Marathon-only modifiers - Bumpy, Beat, and Robot (a metallic gray Flat arrow type) - have also been added to the regular modifier list. In addition, a multi-colored arrow type, Vivid, has been added for colorblind players. It resembles the default arrow color scheme used in Dance Dance Revolution.

"Excellent", "Great" and "Decent" judgements are now prefixed or suffixed with a dash. A prefix (-Excellent, -Great or -Decent) indicates that the player stepped too early; a suffix (Excellent-, Great- or Decent-) indicates that the player stepped too late. In novice mode, "Way Off" becomes "Way Early" and "Way Late" respectively; in other modes, the dash system still applies.

"Stretch Jumps" have been included in double play, a jump that requires a player to hit two panels simultaneously that are farther away from each other than normal jumps, such as 1PU+2PD or 1PL+2PL.

== Songs ==
In the Groove 2 includes more than 60 new songs in addition to the entire songlist from the previous version, In the Groove. The sequel includes new songs from established artists like ZiGZaG, Kid Whatever, Inspector K, Nina, Digital Explosion, and Machinae Supremacy. It also introduces songs from newcomers like Tekno Dred, Affinity, Hybrid, Lynn, and Onyx.

As with the original game, several artists that have released songs for Dance Dance Revolution games appear on ITG2. These include Bambee, Missing Heart, Spacekats (known as Bus Stop in DDR, with the exclusion of one member), Ni-Ni, Triple J, E-ROTIC and Lynn (Papaya in DDR). In fact, three songs appear on ITG2 that have been on Dance Dance Revolution games, though with different step charts: Typical Tropical and Bumble Bee from Bambee and Sunshine (originally Follow The Sun) from Triple J.

Of note, Wanna Do ~Hardhouse Mix~ is the only song in ITG to have a dedicated music video in-game, as it also serves as the theme song for the game.

== Software updates ==
As In The Groove 2 matured as an arcade game, Roxor released patches, called "revisions", that could be applied to the machine in order to update it, fix bugs, adjust timing window errors, and other issues as they were discovered. This list contains only changes that were officially published by Roxor Games.

Their website discussing these Machine Updates, and their respective downloads are still available on an Internet Archive capture of Roxor Games' website.

Installing a revision also includes fixes from previous revisions, unless otherwise indicated. Official revision releases include:

- Revision 1: This is the first version of In The Groove 2, and it is considered to be a beta. This is the only revision of the arcade that is not capable of performing updates.
- Revision 2: This is the first public version of In The Groove 2 It was released on July 11, 2005. It adds the machine's serial number to the title screen, and it adds a coin debounce time setting to fix a coin issue, where the machine may count a single coin as multiple coins.
- Revision 5: This was released on November 2, 2005. It introduces numerous changes:
  - Volume mixing is lowered from 90% to 85% to fix clipping problems.
  - The service button must be held down briefly, to prevent accidental triggering due to electrical noise.
  - Debounce all input, to fix spurious input problems (fixes extra way offs, mine explosions).
  - In diagnostics, show the serial number of the drive in red.
  - Fixed holding left and tapping right allows changing songs after selecting chance.
  - Fixed pressing left/right while holding select to change difficulty also moves the wheel.
  - Improved power selection for USB devices; may improve compatibility with the first generation iPod Shuffle.
  - Fixed logo splash sound; it ignores the Attract Sound Frequency setting.
  - Improved memory card backup logic to reduce chance of corruption.
  - Fixed pen drive "edit" icons in double play showing edits for single play.
  - Default "premium" option is "double for one credit".
  - Increased time to select a song or course.
  - Fixed mods stored on memory card cause Disqualification in Survival mode.
  - Fixed step errors on the following songs: Vertex^2 (double expert), Baby Don't You Want Me (double medium), Bumble Bee (single novice), Get Happy (double medium), Birdie Birdie (double medium), Reactor (double medium), Vorsprung Durch Techno (double medium), Life of a Butterfly double medium (multiple), Oasis (multiple), Out of the Dark (double medium), and Monolith (single expert).
  - Corrected sync on the following songs: Delirium, Xuxa, Queen of Light, Disconnected -Hyper-, Monolith, Hardcore Symphony, Typical Tropical, Amore, Agent Blatant, Incognito, Robotix, Clockwork Genesis, and Destiny.
- Revision 8: This was released on November 17, 2005. Players can now insert coins when the loading screen appears. It also removes spurious coin drop on startup on some conversion kit machines. Finally, dedicated cabinets had a bug that required pressing both the Service and Test buttons for the Service Menu; this revision fixes the bug so that only the Service button must be held down briefly.
- Revision 16: This was released on August 28, 2006. It fixes sync problems on the latest batch of dedicated cabinets, and it fully supports the first generation iPod Shuffle as a memory card.
- Revision 21: This was released on October 11, 2006. It enables the Custom Songs option, which is disabled by default, but can be enabled by the operator in the service menu. It also fixes the delayed input issue on some upgrade kits.
- Revision 23: This was released on January 26, 2007. On cabinets with the Custom Songs option enabled, such songs are now limited to a maximum of 2 minutes each. It also fixes inaccurate input on some upgrade kits. This was the final update given to In The Groove 2, due to the Konami Lawsuit.

== Custom Songs on Revision 21 ==
On October 11, 2006 (a week prior to the official announcement of Konami's acquisition of the intellectual property rights to In The Groove), Roxor released Revision 21 (also referred to as r21). The patch adds a feature that allows players to bring custom songs from home and play them on the machine. Songs were created using StepMania, and the song files and accompanying audio files are stored on the player's USB card. When the player inserts their USB card into the machine they can then select the song from the game menu.

The feature had some intentional limitations:

- The music file can be no more than 120 seconds (2 minutes) long.
- The music file must be in Ogg Vorbis format.
- Ogg music files must be less than 5 MB in size.
- Banners and song samples aren't loaded, and are thus absent from the song selection screen.
- Background images (whether still or video) aren't loaded; instead, random background videos run during play. However, background scripts that use In the Groove's background videos do work within r21.
- A maximum of 50 songs are loaded from each player's USB card. Time limits in the game's loading screens sometimes caused fewer songs to be loaded.
- Custom Songs must be manually enabled in the configuration menu.

An unofficial patch was later discovered online to circumvent the song length limit. Players could manipulate the metadata in the header of the OGG file to make the game think the song is only 1:45 long. The program which performs this patch is commonly referred to as the Ogg Length Patch program. This allows songs of any length to be played on the machine as long as the music file is still under 5 MB in size. The Ogg Length Patch vulnerability as well as other bugs and timing issues were fixed in R23. While R23 has timing corrections and bug fixes, it forces all custom songs to end at 120 seconds of play regardless of the use of the Ogg Length Patch.

Despite the timing fixes, Revision 23 is unpopular with the majority of ITG players. Even though some professional players prefer r23 due to the timing fixes, the strict time limit of 120 seconds was looked down upon since some official Dance Dance Revolution songs and even some official songs on the In The Groove 2 cabinet itself go beyond this time limit. Some players feel that RoXor should have implemented a system similar to Dance Dance Revolution 5th Mix (and already implemented in StepMania) in which songs longer than 150 seconds (2½ minutes) are deemed a "long version" song, which takes up two stages (two songs' worth) of the player's credit, instead of blocking the songs from being played entirely.

== Machine Hacking ==
=== General Information ===
Some technologically savvy players have found methods of hacking the game and loading additional content onto an "In the Groove 2" machine. The In The Groove 2 arcade machine has a regular computer inside that runs a distribution of Debian Linux and a modified version of the open-source StepMania software. Players who can gain access to the data on the hard drive of the computer can modify configuration files, add new features, load new songs, change graphics or artwork, or modify the behavior of the StepMania engine running in the game.

The most popular methods of hacking involve booting the machine into a rogue operating system (usually a live Linux distribution such as SLAX Frodo). From there, additional songs and data can be downloaded from the USB card plugged into the Player 1 USB port, while a USB keyboard is plugged in to the Player 2 USB port to type commands at the Linux console.

Most of these hacks utilize an option in one of StepMania's configuration files, Static.ini, to load songs and content from additional locations on the hard drive where the hacker can store songs and other data.

=== OpenITG and NotITG ===
Due to the popularity of the franchise, some players modified the game to be played on home computers, which in 2009 became released as OpenITG, based on the code for StepMania 3.95. In 2016, an internet user known as Taro4012 released NotITG, a fork of OpenITG which is "designed to make it easier for mod file creators to implement their ideas. It aims to preserve compatibility with all existing StepMania 3.95 and In The Groove mod files, and be the definitive environment for creating and enjoying that content.". This was released in 2016 alongside the release of the song pack for the eighth tournament Taro has hosted titled the "UKSRT" (United Kingdom Sight Reading Tournament) in which players read modcharts (stages in which the visuals are much more unusual, often with notes that are hard to read) that they've never seen before. Often these modcharts used in UKSRT are specifically made for the tournament, and have many gimmicks.

As of October 10, 2024, the latest version of NotITG available to the public is version 4.9.1.

== Tournaments ==
In The Groove 2 tournaments are held at arcades throughout the world. Some of the most notable tournaments are NAT05 and the ITG World Cup, in which first place received an ITG2 dedicated cabinet. Most tournaments are scored on a player's dance percentage. There have been few others that have involved the use of mods, double, and even some that make use of custom songs with the R21 feature. After the lawsuit, the tournament scene began to die down, in part because Roxor could no longer sponsor local tournaments with small prizes and In The Groove paraphernalia such as T-shirts and posters. Still, there are tournaments held throughout the Americas and as of recently, Europe such as the Slippers Hurricane Summer Speed event (France), today that give out cash prizes and other various gifts, such as arcade tokens, coupons, and other video games.

== Home version ==
Due to the Konami lawsuit, a PlayStation 2 port of In The Groove 2 was ultimately canceled. However, a non-final beta version of the game was leaked onto the internet. A patch is available for the PC version of In The Groove that adds the new songs and theme from In The Groove 2 to the game. It is referred to as "Song Pack A".

== See also ==
- Dance pad
