= Kelly Sumner =

British businessman

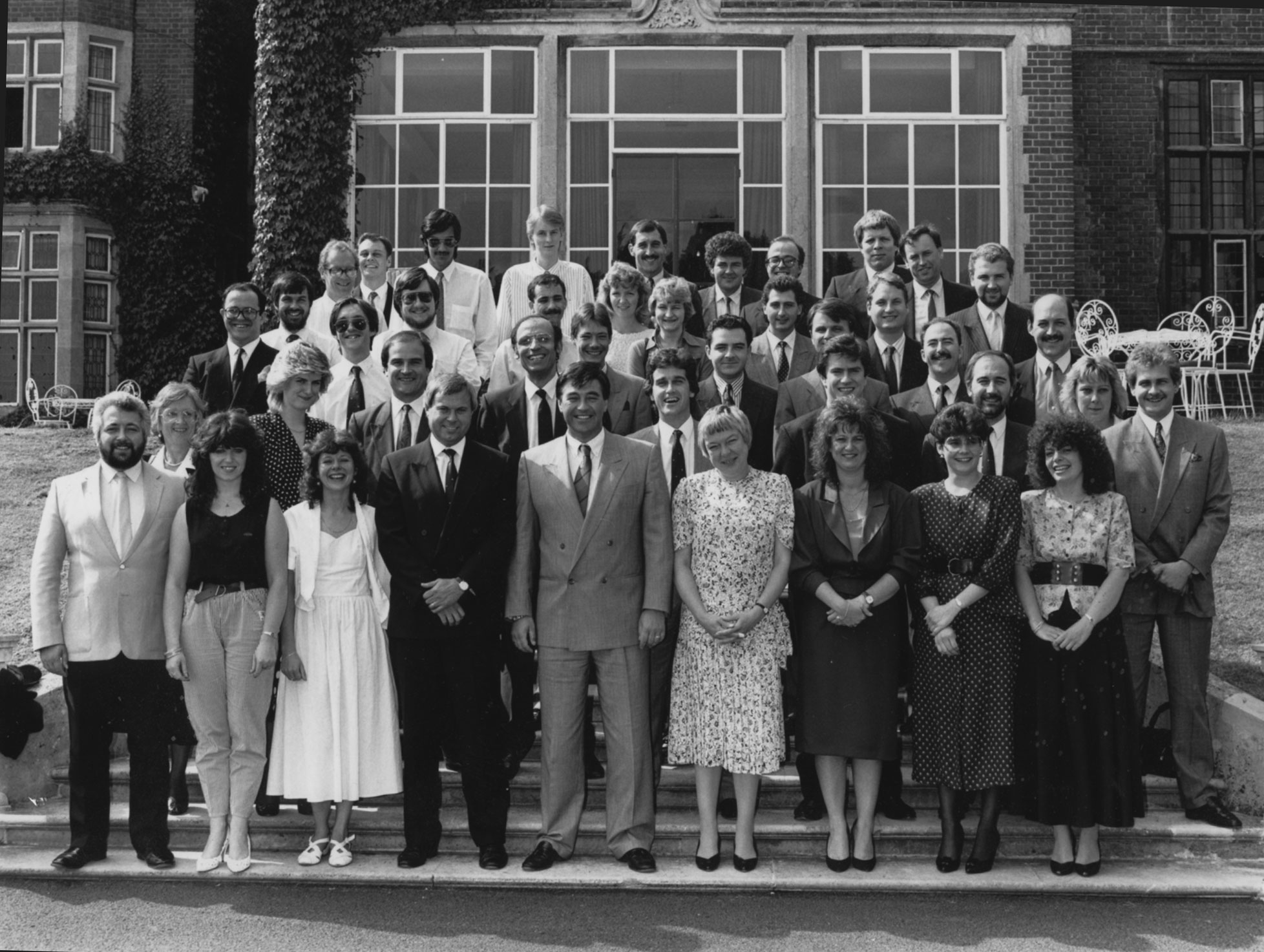
The entire staff of Commodore UK at a kick off event, 1989.

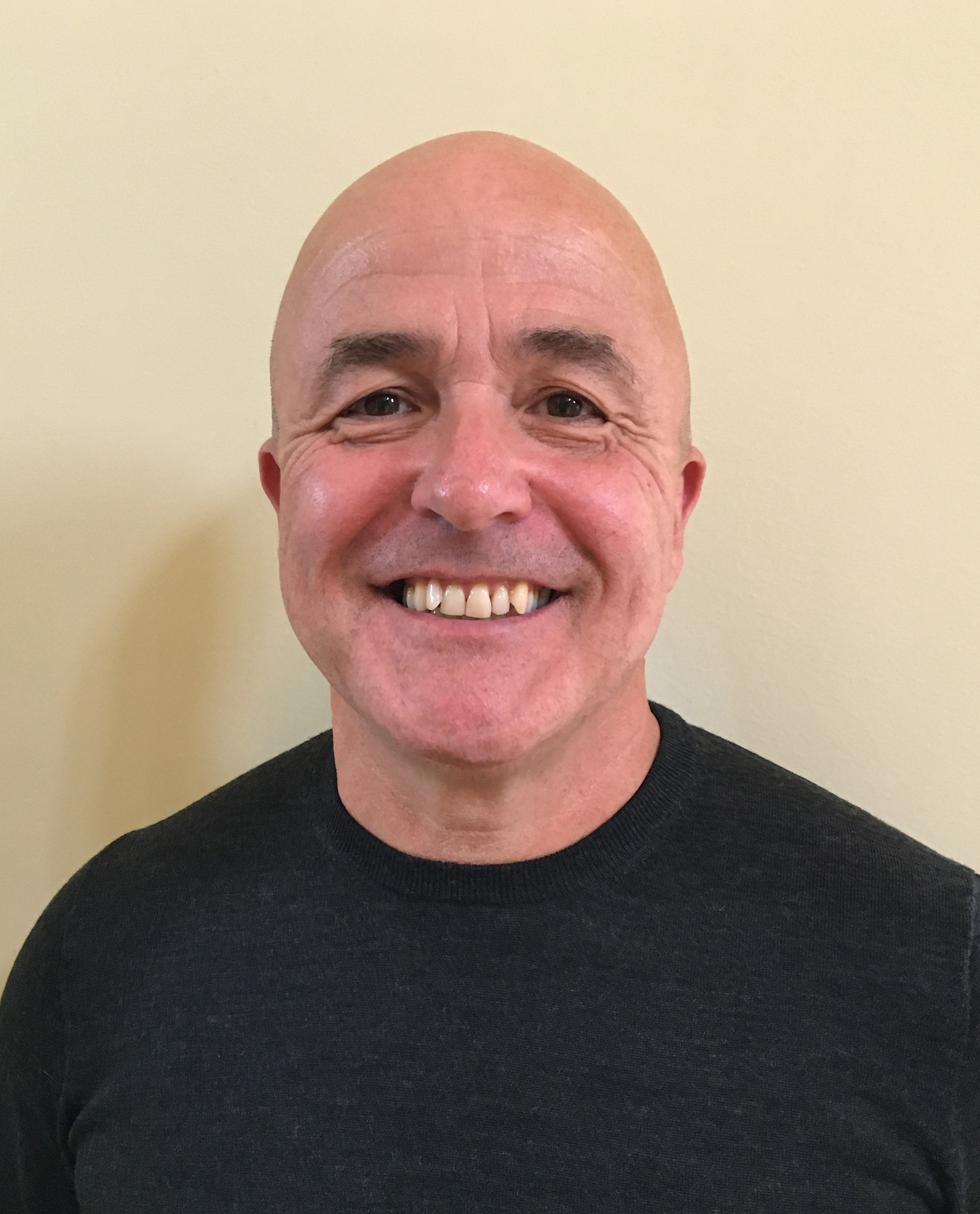
Kelly Sumner

Kelly Sumner (born 29 April 1961) is a businessman. Sumner has run two NASDAQ listed companies, and has 40 years experience in hardware and software.

== Career ==
Kelly Sumner began work in the industry as a trainee electronics engineer at Commodore in 1979. He progressed up the corporate ladder becoming managing director of Commodore in the UK.

From hardware he moved into entertainment software, joining US based Nintendo and Sega publisher Gametek as European MD before becoming CEO. Sumner merged Gametek into the fledgling publisher Take Two shortly thereafter. As CEO he took the company to annual sales of $1 billion, investing in the creation of amongst others, Rockstar Games, launching products such as Grand Theft Auto and delivering a four-fold increase in the share price.

After Take Two, Sumner became CEO of RedOctane fronting the commercial development of Guitar Hero, the video game that went on to become a $1 billion franchise. He sold RedOctane to Activision in 2006 for $160 million.

More recently Sumner has been investing in early stage tech companies. During this period he has been chairman of Intent Media, which was sold to Newbay Capital; and Mediatonic (Fall Guys) which was sold to Synova Capital, and a board director of the cloud CRM company, TPoint, which was sold to New York-based private equity company Aquiline Capital Partners.

He is currently a director of ArBa Developments, and chairman and investor at Reactional Music.

Reactional is a rules-based music engine and delivery platform that connects the music and games industries commercially and creatively, allowing any music to be brought into a game and the entire game’s visuals, music and sound to react live to that music, something that has not been possible before.

Reactional’s music platform introduces new possibilities for music experiences, in-game purchases, music creation, and prototyping for game developers. It expands music choices while making the platform easier and more intuitive to use.

Sumner is also a former vice president of Chelsea Football Club. He resides in Weybridge, Surrey with his wife, Kirsteen.

Appeared as a contestant on the videogame show GamesMaster (Series 2 Episode 12). Winning the Golden Joystick by completing his challenge on The Humans on the Amiga.
