= RedOctane =

American video game company

RedOctane, Inc.
- Type: Subsidiary
- Industry: Video games
- Founded: 1999; 27 years ago
- Founders: Kai Huang; Charles Huang
- Defunct: February 11, 2010
- Fate: Closed
- Headquarters: Mountain View, California, US
- Key people: Kai Huang (CEO and co-founder); Charles Huang (COO and co-founder); Kelly Sumner (Chief Executive Officer)
- Parent: Activision (2006–2010)

RedOctane, Inc. was an American video game company. They were best known for producing the Guitar Hero series, beginning in November 2005. RedOctane became a wholly owned subsidiary of Activision in 2006, which later closed down in February 2010.

A new studio, RedOctane Games LLC, dedicated to rhythm games, was founded in August 2025 by several former RedOctane staff under the Freemode division of Embracer Group, with the original co-founders Kai and Charles Huang returning as advisors.

== History ==
RedOctane was founded in 1999 by the brothers Kai Huang and Charles Huang. They got their beginnings operating the world's first online video game rental service, called WebGameZone. They soon began to create game accessories such as the Red Octane Ignition dance mat, joysticks, and other accessories to build upon already-existing musical games. After soon realizing that their game accessories were tied to the launch dates of the games they were producing for, Red Octane began producing games. Their first original game was a PlayStation 2 port of Roxor Games' arcade rhythm game In the Groove.

RedOctane teamed with developer Harmonix Music Systems to release Guitar Hero in November 2005 for the PlayStation 2. Around the time it was released, RedOctane teamed up with MTV to make use of the video game in its original programming. The game was successful, and RedOctane released a sequel in 2006 for the PlayStation 2 and Xbox 360.

In May 2006, video game publisher Activision announced plans to acquire RedOctane, completing the deal on June 6, 2006. Activision reportedly paid RedOctane $99.9 million in cash and common stock in the acquisition. After the Activision buy-out and a split from Harmonix, RedOctane utilized Activision-owned Neversoft to take the helm on Guitar Hero III: Legends of Rock, which was released in November 2007.

Gaming news site Kotaku called Guitar Hero an "instant cult classic". In its 26 first months after release, Guitar Hero generated over $1 billion in sales.

RedOctane released Guitar Hero World Tour in October 2008.

On February 11, 2010, Activision announced the closure of their RedOctane division.

== RedOctane Games ==
Former staff of RedOctane and Vicarious Visions, which led Guitar Hero development at Activision after RedOctane's closure, announced in August 2025 a new studio RedOctane Games LLC under Embracer Freemode, dedicated to "advancing the rhythm game genre". Co-founders Charles and Kai Huang, who launched periphery manufacture CRKD (also a subsidiary of Embracer) following their departure from the original RedOctane will be returning in a special advisory capacity, with former Vicarious Visions studio head and former VP of Operations at Blizzard Entertainment Simon Ebejer leading the studio. The new RedOctane plans to reveal their first game later in 2025, supporting guitar controllers. Ebejer said that after the fall of the rhythm game market in 2009, fan-driven projects like Clone Hero and YARG had kept an active fan community, and subsequently with the release of Fortnite Festival, demonstrated there was a place for a premium rhythm game.

Their project, Stage Tour, was announced in February 2026 with a planned release on December 10th, 2026, with plans for release on Windows and consoles. It will support plastic instrument controllers with up to four players across guitar, groove/bass, vocals and drums, as well as support for standard computer keyboard controls and gamepads. Though planned for digital release, RedOctane also plans to release physical packages bundled with instruments for those without existing controllers.
