= Pump It Up (video game series) =

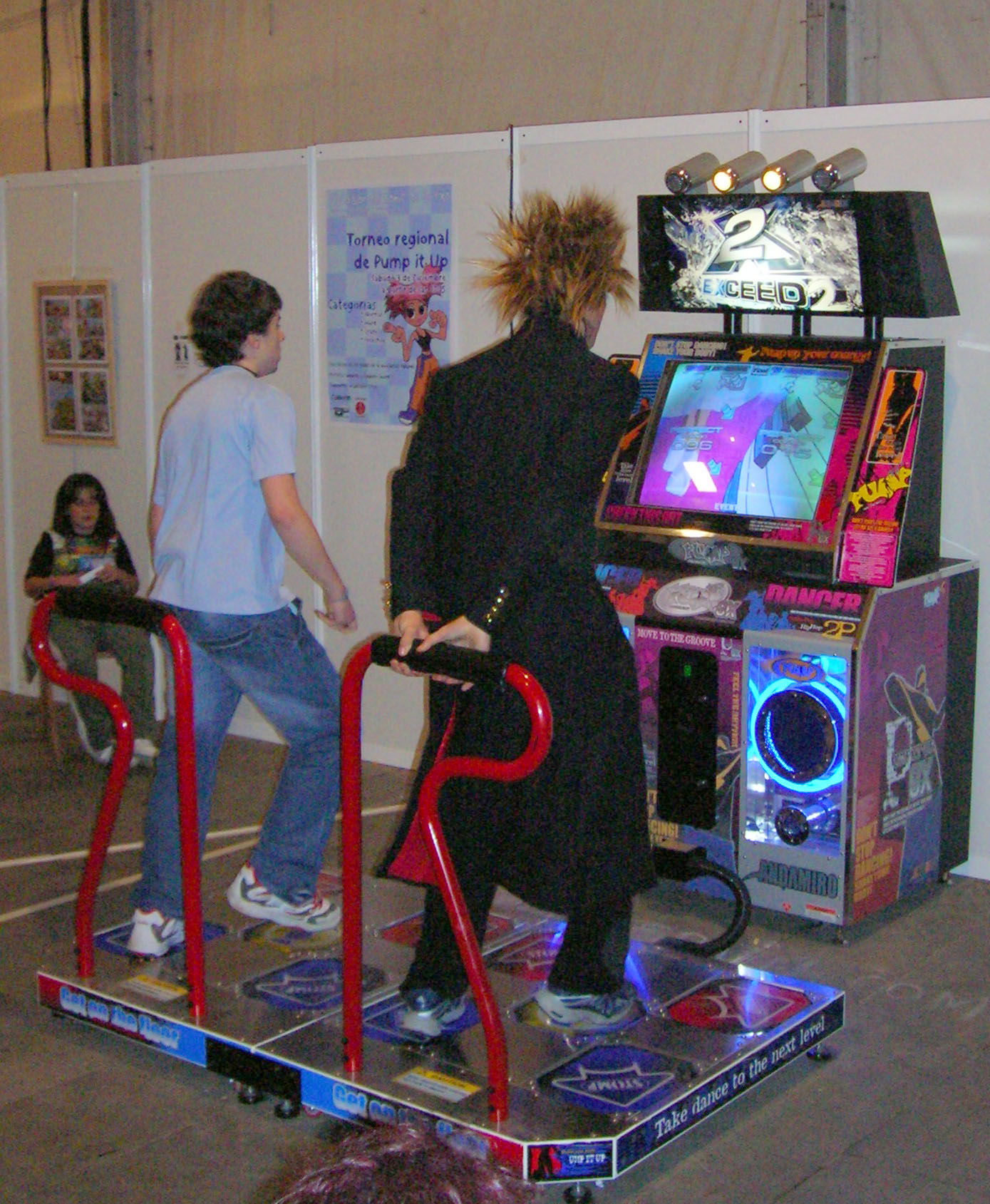
- An attendee and a cosplayer play Pump It Up, Getxo Comic Con, 2005.
- Genre: Music video game
- Developers: Andamiro; F2 Systems; Freevolt; Nexcade; M Project
- Publisher: Andamiro
- Platforms: Arcade, PC, PlayStation 2, Xbox, PSP, iOS, Android
- First release: Pump It Up: The 1st Dance Floor; September 1999
- Latest release: Pump It Up Phoenix 2; 9 July 2026 (South Korea); 20 July 2026 (internationally)

Pump It Up (Korean: 펌프 잇 업) is a music video game series developed and published by Andamiro, a South Korean arcade game producer.

The game is similar to Dance Dance Revolution, except that it has five arrow panels as opposed to four, and is typically or mostly played on a dance pad with five arrow panels: the bottom-left, top-left, a center, top-right, and a bottom-right. Additional gameplay modes may utilize two five-panel pads side by side. These panels are pressed using the player's feet, in response to arrows that appear on the screen in front of the player. The arrows are synchronized to the general rhythm or beat of a chosen song, and success is dependent on the player's ability to time and position their steps accordingly.

The original version of the game was originally released in South Korea on 20 September 1999. The series has also expanded internationally to other markets, primarily in North America, South America, and Europe. It had slightly expanded into parts of Oceania as well.

Pump It Up 2026 Phoenix 2 is the latest version of the series, having been released on July 9, 2026, in South Korea, using green as its dominant colour. Internationally, it was released on July 20, 2026.

Historically, Pump It Up has tried to cater to freestyle players in addition to "technical" players by including freestyle-friendly charts, and as a result, the game has a culture in the freestyle and breakdancing disciplines. However, in recent versions the game has shifted to focus more heavily on "technical" players, expanding the vast array of high-difficulty songs, step charts, and title-based achievements.

== History ==
=== 1999: The First Dance Floor and sequel ===
The first game was known simply as Pump It Up (PIU), and it was released to South Korean arcades in September 1999. It includes 15 songs, and it is retroactively known as Pump 1st in subsequent PIU releases. A sequel, Pump It Up: The 2nd Dance Floor, was released on 27 December 1999. It adds 23 new songs while removing "Hatred" by Novasonic from the first game. A home version known as Pump It Up The Fusion: The 1st N' 2nd Dance Floor was released at the end of 1999 for Microsoft Windows computers.

=== 2000s: International expansion, NX and Pro ===
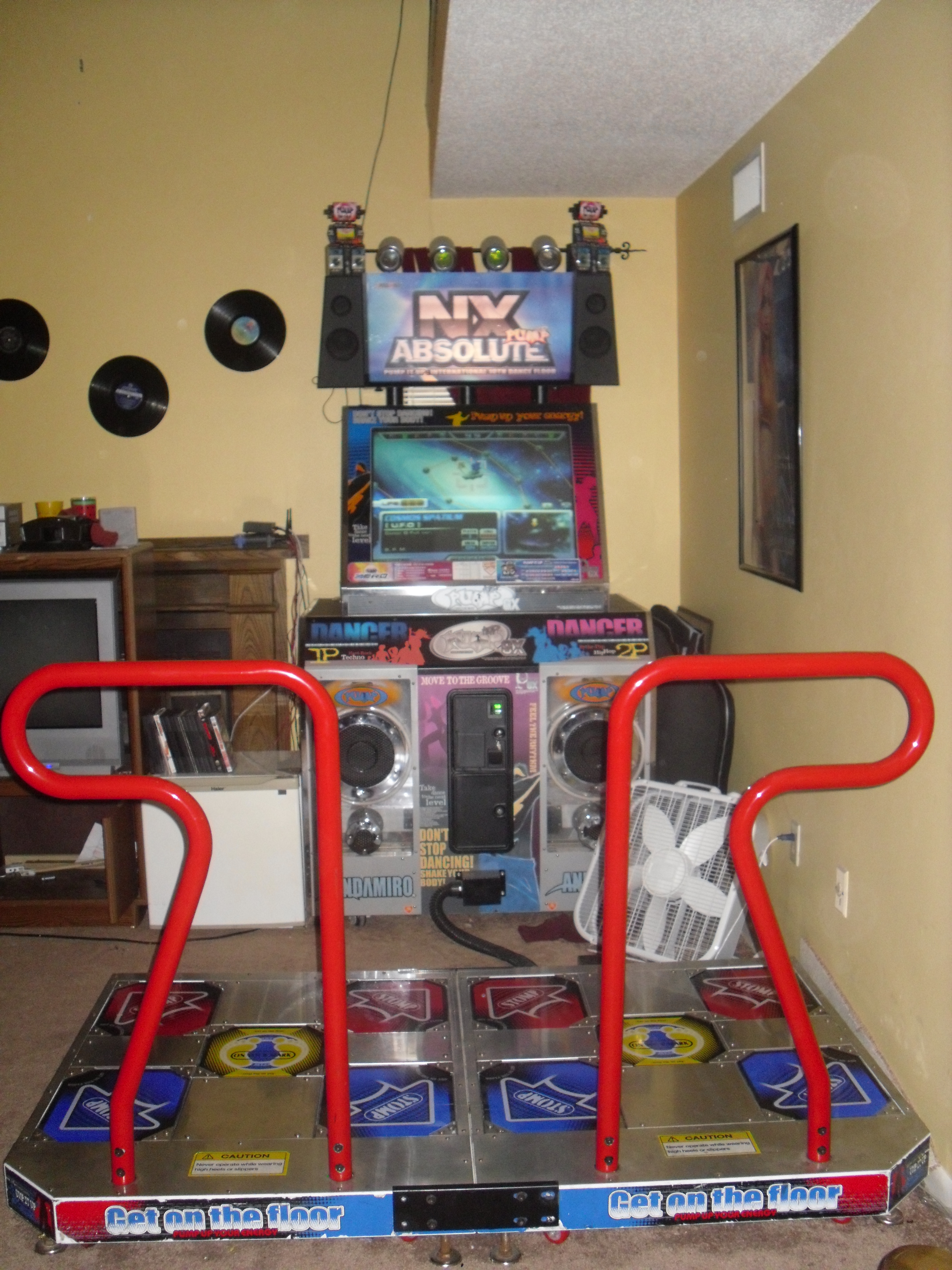
Pump It Up NX Absolute running on a GX cabinet

Konami filed a lawsuit in Seoul, South Korea against Andamiro in 2000, claiming that Pump It Up infringed upon their design right for Dance Dance Revolution. The court found in Konami's favor, but Andamiro appealed. At the same time, Andamiro sued Konami in the state of California, claiming that DDR violated their patent for Pump It Up. Both suits were ultimately settled out of court, and the details were never publicly released.

Pump It Up The O.B.G: The 3rd Dance Floor was released on 7 May 2000 in South Korea. The name O.B.G is an acronym for Oldies But Goodies. A home version for Windows computers was also released later in 2000, while an expansion to O.B.G known as The Season Evolution Dance Floor was released in September 2000. Aside from one exception, future releases did not follow this numbering pattern, beginning with Pump It Up: The Collection on 14 November 2000, followed by an expansion titled The Perfect Collection in December 2000, and Pump It Up Extra in January 2001.

Pump It Up The Premiere: The International Dance Floor was released to arcades in June 2001. As its name suggests, it is the first title to be released outside of South Korea. That same year, Pump It Up: The Evolutionary Dance Floor was released for Windows computers in North America. The sequel, Pump It Up The PREX: The International Dance Floor, was released to arcades in November 2001. The name PREX is a combination of Premiere and Extra from previous games. Afterwards, The International Dance Floor became a series spanning 10 main releases, plus the first PREX.

Pump It Up NX introduced a new cabinet featuring a widescreen LCD monitor. The game continued to run at 480p, and upgrade kits for older machines remained available.

Pump It Up Pro is a spin-off of the Pump It Up series exclusive to the United States and Canada. It was developed by the team behind the In The Groove series.

In 2008, a new spin-off of Pump It Up was added: Pump It Up Jump! for children.

Pump It Up NX Absolute: The International 10th Dance Floor was released on November 25, 2008.

=== 2010-2023: Fiesta, Infinity, Prime and XX ===
In 2010, only one spin-off of Pump It Up was released: Pump It Up Pro 2 for experienced PIU players.

Pump It Up 2010 Fiesta was released to arcades worldwide on 6 March 2010. It was followed by two sequels: 2011 Fiesta EX in 2011, and 2013 Fiesta 2 in late 2012 or early 2013.

Pump It Up Infinity was the final Pump It Up spin-off. It was released in January 2013 in the United States and Canada.

Pump It Up 2015 Prime was released in December 2014 in arcades. It is the first game in the series to run in 720p high definition on supported cabinets, although older cabinets ran the game at 480p standard resolution instead. A sequel, Pump It Up 2017 Prime 2, was released in November 2016, while a 2018 update features future improvements. Prime 2 and the 2018 update are the final versions to support standard definition SD, SX, DX and GX cabinets.

Pump It Up XX 20th Anniversary Edition was released on 7 January 2019, to celebrate 20 years of the Pump It Up series. This version runs exclusively on cabinets with 720p high definition support. It was the longest running Pump It Up game of the decade at that time. Two months later, the servers of Prime 2 were shut down on 28 March 2019.

=== 2023–present: Phoenix ===
On March 31, 2023, Pump It Up Phoenix was first announced to be released in the same year, with further details being announced on May 10, 2023. Having the phoenix mythology as its theme, the game's color scheme uses orange and yellow, symbolizing the fire from the phoenix myth. The game was released in South Korea on 4 July 2023, showcasing the new Premium mode, and an updated scoring system. The game would later on be released globally at the start of August 2023. Four months later, the servers of XX were shut down on 11 December 2023.

On May 16, 2024, Pump It Up 2024 Phoenix was first teased on the official YouTube channel, changing its color scheme to blue, and available as a free update for existing 2023 Phoenix machines on May 27, 2024. Following 2024 Phoenix's Extra Content Update Teaser on December 18, 2025, Pump It Up Phoenix 2 was announced to release in 2026, and was teased in PlayX4 on April 30, 2026, showcasing its new green color scheme and Steam integration. Phoenix 2 was announced to be released in South Korea on July 9, 2026, and later on be globally released on 20 July of the same year. Two months later, the servers of Phoenix were shut down in late-September 2026.

== Development ==
Pump It Up: Exceed had the option to download a step editor via Xbox Live which allowed players to edit songs already in the game or import tracks that are saved to the consoles hard drive.

Pump It Up Zero was released in the arcade in January 2006 before releasing on the PSP in October of the following year. Zero contained a brand new interface, now featuring previews of background videos and the ability for two players to play on separate difficulties. Zero also contained the Easy Station, a mode containing a modified interface and a selection of easy songs. The Mission Station contained sets of songs played with specific conditions that must be met when they are played – such as getting a specific amount of a judgment for instance.

Zero also introduced the "Another" step chart difficulty. Another Step songs are not entirely new songs. Rather, they are songs with steps which differ from their original counterparts drastically with some being very experimental in nature. Another Step songs are not given a specific category and are listed with the regular charts for each song. Generally the difficulty of Another charts range from easy to extremely hard, with some songs being impossible to complete without a second player. This has remained a standard feature in later games.

Pump It Up New Xenesis, or NX, was released in December 2006 with new tracks and a mode with nonstop remixes. The channel arrangement on NX was altered, now featuring a default channel containing all 29 new Arcade Station songs. NX is World Tour was a new series of missions for Mission mode named after capital cities of various nations throughout the world as well as after the developers of NX at Nexcade. It consists of a group of 64 missions of three songs each, all with unique step charts containing various challenges such as passing a song, or completing a song with specific conditions or goals to accomplish.

The Remix Station from Zero had been changed to the Special Zone: an area containing nonstop remixes, long versions of songs, and Another mode songs. All of Pump It Up Zero's Another songs have also been moved to the Special Zone. Most of the unlocks, however, depend on playing through World Tour mode. In addition, a new cabinet style has been added to the lineup called the FX, featuring a futuristic design and a 42' plasma display. Yahpp, who split from the BanYa team, became the project lead leading to a style similar to the early games.

Unlike in earlier games, the difficulty level of a song in NX is not visually represented by a number. Levels 1 through 14 are shown or visualized as star icons, each level corresponding to a half icon, while levels 15 to 22 are shown or visualized as skull icons, with each level corresponding to a whole icon. Pump It Up NX2 displays both the stars/skulls and a digital level indicator. The Extra and the Prex series of games also use this graphical style. A "????????" rating is given to songs that are "beyond the charts", gimmick charts that are meant to be impossible for one player, or charts that are meant for two players at the same time. The rating with 8 question marks ("????????") was kept for extreme songs in later games outside of this series.

NX2 released in December 2007, added support for Andamiro's proprietary USB flash drives, which save player progress and worldwide ranking. A new metagame life system was introduced that allows players to play four songs instead of three if they have life left at the end of three songs. Getting an A ranking or higher allows the player to maintain their life points, however, anything lower than an A will cost the player life points. If a player does especially poorly their set will be reduced to only two songs.

The Pump It Up 2010 Fiesta: 10th Anniversary Version added two new mission modes (Quest and Skill Up) and removed difficulty levels in favor of chart options, as well as a new "Basic Mode" for new players. The inclusion of Fiesta EX (2011~2012) and the two sequels, Fiesta 2 (2012~2014) and PRIME (2014~2016) feature a wide selection of music with Prime introducing the global Rank Mode. The next game in the series, PRIME 2 (2016~2019), introduced a new speed system named Auto Velocity, which is calculated by dividing the players Auto Velocity with the BPM of the selected song. In XX (2019~2023), A number of new features have appeared, such as Online Matching, a new title feature, step rewards and more. It is also the first game to only support wide-screen cabs, therefore, only supporting MK9 and MK10 systems.

Currently, the newest game Phoenix series (2023~present) has a new scoring system, now having a maximum score of 1 million points, along with a plate system that depends on the accuracy rather than the combo. It also introduces Premium Mode which requires 2 credits for one player (51 misses break off system, exclusive songs, 6 hearts, and exclusive commands such as Pass M or Pass G) and Normal Mode which requires only one credit (Forced break on at the second stage and over, only 3 stages), moreover, Phoenix is the first game to not support USB as a viable way to load profiles and update the game, and Premium Mode is only available through the AM.PASS service, which requires the machine to be online, thus making Premium Mode as an online-exclusive game mode.

=== The Pro/Infinity series ===
Pump It Up Pro was released by Fun in Motion and Andamiro in 2007. The product is a spin-off of Pump It Up, and was developed separately from the main series with the intent of getting players who normally play 4-panel dance games to try 5-panel dancing. The game utilizes a heavily modified build of StepMania 4 for its engine and was purchasable as a cabinet or as an upgrade for existing Pump It Up machines running MK6 or MK7 hardware.

Kyle Ward is the project lead and is responsible for many of the songs and step charts in this series. Many elements of the game are inherited from In the Groove, a four-panel dance game which Kyle Ward was previously involved with, such as the ability to save stats and song edits on a USB flash drive. Andamiro built cabinets for and distributed In the Groove 2.

The Pro series is also unique among Pump It Up games due to its trademark style. These are the first games led by a non-Korean project head. The good will fostered by Kyle Ward working with Andamiro to create cabinets for In the Groove 2 led to him being given a position within the company as a project creator, lead, and creative consultant.

The default mode is Easy mode, which offers a simplified user interface where a minimal number of options are selectable and the most difficult songs have been removed. The Revision 5 patch added Half Double mode as a difficulty which uses the 6 panels on the inside of the pad layout excluding the outer corners from play. Pump It Up Pro does not contain a separate mode for remixes and long versions, the long songs and remixes present on Pro are present in regular play, and require two rounds to play. In place of a Remix mode is Progressive, a mode containing courses consisting of four songs each. A sequel was released in 2010.

Pump It Up Infinity (2013~2016) was intended as a reboot of the original Pro idea and introduces a "Basic Mode" to encourage new players. Infinity features songs from all Pump It Up versions, including the spin-off series Pump It Up Pro and Pump It Up Pro 2.

== Music ==
The songs used in Pump It Up are mostly South Korean-based. Premiere 3 and Exceed were the only versions to put a greater emphasis on international pop music due to its branching into other markets such as North and Latin America. After Exceed, the focus shifted back to K-pop as the players worldwide generally favored the game's original Korean music. Much of the music on Pump is contributed by an in-house (and mostly anonymous) collective known as BanYa. Two of the main members, Yahpp and Msgoon, recently became independent artists (and as of NX and Fiesta respectively, all of their songs are now branded using their aliases). Aside from the K-pop licenses, most in-house songs on Pump It Up are of South Korean influence. The diversity in genres is very great despite this, covering everything from general pop to heavy metal to hip hop as well as an assortment of uncommon genres such as jazz, folk, and ska. Some of BanYa's songs include covers of classical pieces such as Canon in D (in which it become notorious), mostly performed in a symphonic rock style and has a tempo of 160 beats per minute.

In comparison to Konami's Bemani line-up and other arcade rhythm games, there has been a negligible emphasis on electronic music in Pump, but the first instances of electronic music on Pump were on NX2, as five crossovers from the American-made spinoff appeared, which in contrast, has a greater emphasis on electronic music.

== List of games ==
Release timeline Pump It Up omitted from titles
1999	The 1st Dance Floor
1999	The 2nd Dance Floor
1999	THE FUSION: The 1st N' 2nd Dance Floor
2000	The O.B.G: The 3rd Dance Floor
2000	THE FUSION: The 3rd Dance Floor
2000	The O.B.G: The Season Evolution Dance Floor
2000	The Collection
2000	The Perfect Collection
2001	Extra
2001	The Premiere: The International Dance Floor
2001	The Evolutionary Dance Floor
2001	The PREX: The International Dance Floor
2002	The Rebirth: The 8th Dance Floor
2002	The Premiere 2: The International 2nd Dance Floor
2002	The PREX 2
2003	The Premiere 3: The International 3rd Dance Floor
2003	The PREX 3: The International 4th Dance Floor
2004	Exceed: The International 5th Dance Floor
2004	Exceed Special Edition
2004	Exceed 2: The International 6th Dance Floor
2005
2006	Zero: International 7th Dance Floor
2006	NX: New Xenesis
2007	Zero Portable
2007	Pro
2007	NX2: Next Xenesis
2008	Jump!
2008	NX Absolute: International 10th Dance Floor
2009
2010	Pro 2
2010	Fiesta
2011	Fiesta EX
2012	Fiesta 2
2013	Infinity
2014	Prime
2015
2016	Prime 2
2017
2018	H5: 20th Anniversary HTML5 Edition
2019	XX 20th Anniversary Edition
2019	M 20th Anniversary Mobile Edition
2020–2022
2023	Phoenix
2024
2025	Rise
2026	Phoenix 2

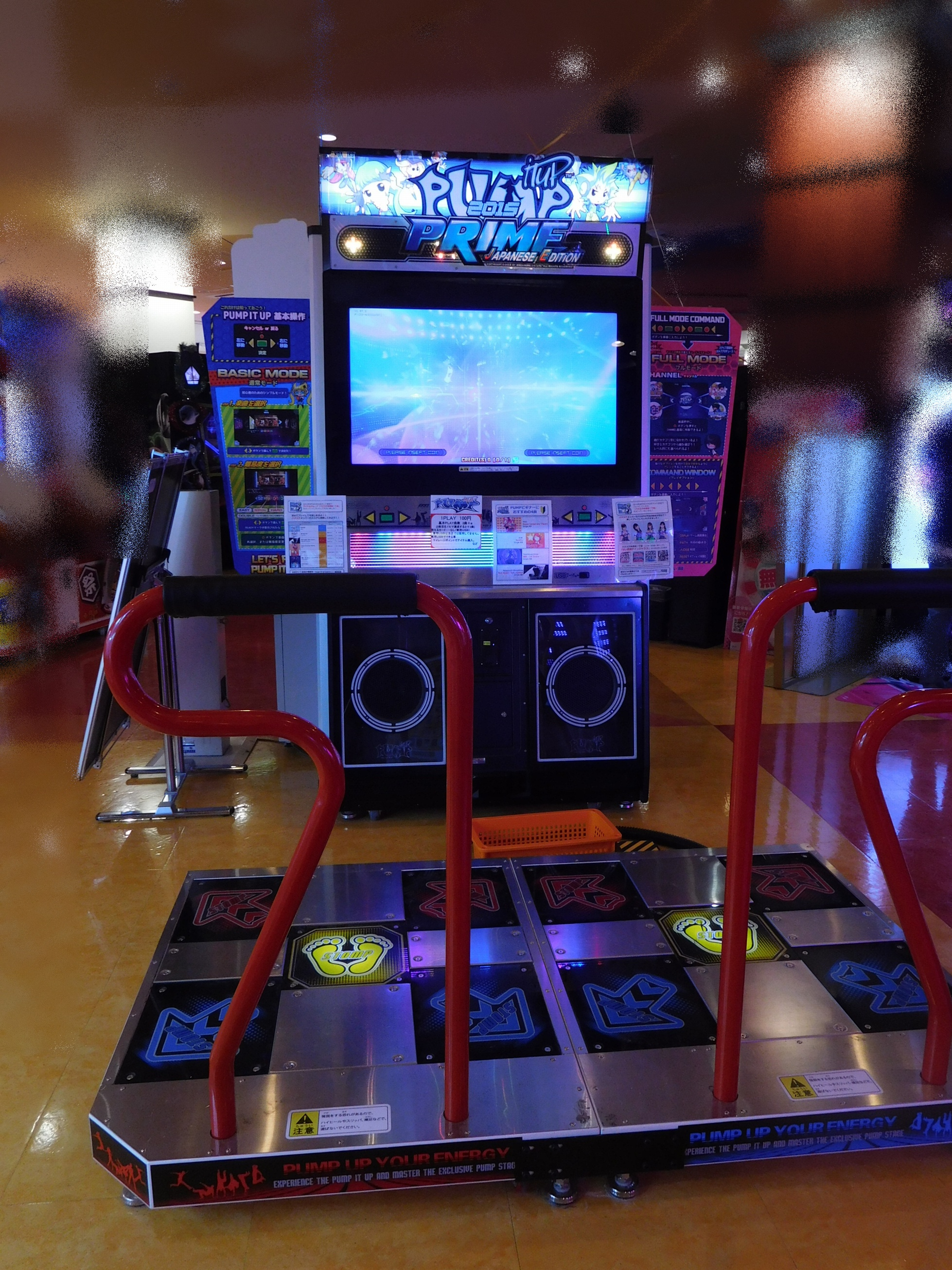
Pump It Up 2015 Prime arcade machine

- Pump It Up: The 1st Dance Floor (20 September 1999, Arcade, exclusive to South Korea)
- Pump It Up: The 2nd Dance Floor (27 December 1999, Arcade, exclusive to South Korea)
- Pump It Up THE FUSION: The 1st N' 2nd Dance Floor (1999, PC, exclusive to South Korea)
- Pump It Up The O.B.G: The 3rd Dance Floor (7 May 2000, Arcade, exclusive to South Korea)
- Pump It Up THE FUSION: The 3rd Dance Floor (2000, PC, exclusive to South Korea)
- Pump It Up The O.B.G: The Season Evolution Dance Floor (3 September 2000, Arcade, exclusive to South Korea)
- Pump It Up: The Collection (14 November 2000, Arcade, exclusive to South Korea)
- Pump It Up: The Perfect Collection (7 December 2000, Arcade/PC, exclusive to South Korea)
- Pump It Up Extra (20 January 2001, Arcade, exclusive to South Korea)
- Pump It Up The Premiere: The International Dance Floor (June 2001, Arcade, outside South Korea only)
- Pump It Up: The Evolutionary Dance Floor (2001, PC, exclusive to North America)
- Pump It Up The PREX: The International Dance Floor (November 2001, Arcade, outside South Korea only)
- Pump It Up The Rebirth: The 8th Dance Floor (10 January 2002, Arcade, exclusive to South Korea)
- Pump It Up The Premiere 2: The International 2nd Dance Floor (9 March 2002, Arcade, outside South Korea only)
- Pump It Up The PREX 2 (23 November 2002, Arcade, outside South Korea only)
- Pump It Up The Premiere 3: The International 3rd Dance Floor (11 May 2003, Arcade, outside South Korea only)
- Pump It Up The PREX 3: The International 4th Dance Floor (4 October 2003, Arcade/PC, exclusive to South Korea)
- Pump It Up Exceed: The International 5th Dance Floor (2 April 2004, Arcade)
- Pump It Up Exceed Special Edition (December 2004, PS2/Xbox, exclusive to North America)
- Pump It Up Exceed 2: The International 6th Dance Floor (30 November 2004, Arcade)
- Pump It Up Zero: International 7th Dance Floor (28 January 2006, Arcade)
- Pump It Up NX: New Xenesis (15 December 2006, Arcade)
- Pump It Up Zero Portable (August 2007, PSP)
- Pump It Up Pro (15 August 2007, Arcade)
- Pump It Up NX2: Next Xenesis (14 December 2007, Arcade)
- Pump It Up Jump! (14 August 2008, Arcade)
- Pump It Up NX Absolute: International 10th Dance Floor (25 November 2008, Arcade)
- Pump It Up Pro 2 (22 February 2010, Arcade)
- Pump It Up 2010 Fiesta (6 March 2010, Arcade)
- Pump It Up 2011 Fiesta EX (22 January 2011, Arcade)
- Pump It Up 2013 Fiesta 2 (24 November 2012, Arcade)
- Pump It Up Infinity (30 January 2013, Arcade)
- Pump It Up 2015 Prime (13 December 2014, Arcade)
- Pump It Up 2017 Prime 2 (13 November 2016, Arcade)
  - Pump It Up 2018 Prime 2 (1 January 2018, Arcade)
- Pump It Up H5: 20th Anniversary HTML5 Edition (6 December 2018, Facebook Instant Games)
- Pump It Up XX 20th Anniversary Edition (7 January 2019, Arcade)
  - Pump It Up XX 20th Anniversary Edition (2020) (26 December 2019, Arcade)
- Pump It Up M 20th Anniversary Mobile Edition (17 October 2019, Mobile)
- Pump It Up 2023 Phoenix (4 July 2023, Arcade)
  - Pump It Up 2024 Phoenix (27 May 2024, Arcade)
- Pump It Up Rise (15 July 2025, PC)
- Pump It Up 2026 Phoenix 2 (9 July 2026, Arcade)

== Hardware ==
Characteristics	=== 4:3 ratio-based arcade cabinets ===			
Characteristics	SD	DX	SX	GX
Photo				
Year released	1999		2001	2004
Thematic color	Black and grey			
Screen	CRT-based, 29"	Rear projection-based, 51"	CRT-based, 29"	CRT-based, 33"
Lighting	Front and panel lights			
Lighting Technology	Front Lights (halogen spotlights, blue neon tubes, incandescent bulbs, fluorescent tubes); Panel Lights (fluorescent tubes)			
Sound	4 speakers (2 full-range, 2 subwoofers)		3 or 4 speakers (2 full-range, 1 or 2 subwoofers)	4 speakers (2 full-range, 2 subwoofers)
Built-in card & USB Reader	Optional (AM.PASS and USB)			
Panel colors	Red (diagonal); Yellow (center); Blue (diagonal); White text and arrow borders			
Handle bar colors	Red			
First game included	Pump It Up: The 1st Dance Floor (1999)		Pump It Up: The PREX (2001)	Pump It Up Exceed (2004)
Final game included	Pump It Up Prime 2 (2018)			

Characteristics	=== 16:9 ratio-based arcade cabinets ===			
Characteristics	FX	CX	TX	LX
Photo				
Year released	2006	2011		2017
Thematic color	Black and grey	Black		Black and white
Screen	PDP-based, 42"	PDP-based, 42" (early); LCD-based, 42"	PDP-based, 50" (early); LCD-based, 55"	LCD-based, 55"
Lighting	Front and panel lights			
Sound	4 speakers	4 speakers (2 speakers, 2 subwoofers)	6 speakers (4 speakers, 2 subwoofers)	6 speakers (4 speakers, 2 subwoofers)
Built-in card & USB reader	USB			USB and AM.PASS
Panel colors	Red (diagonal); Yellow (center); Blue (diagonal); White text and arrow borders			
Handle bar colors	Red			
First game included	Pump It Up NX (2006)	Pump It Up Fiesta EX (2011)		Pump It Up Prime 2 (2017)
Final game included	Present			

== See also ==
- List of Pump It Up songs
- World Pump Festival
