= In the Groove (video game) =

2004 video game

- PlayStation 2 cover artwork
- Developer: Roxor Games
- Publishers: Roxor Games (arcade); RedOctane (PS2 port)
- Engine: StepMania
- Platforms: Arcade, Mac OS X, PlayStation 2, Windows
- Release: NA: August 30, 2004 (Arcade); NA: June 17, 2005 (PlayStation 2); EU: August 21, 2006; NA: August 21, 2006 (Mac OS X, Windows)
- Genres: Music, Exercise
- Modes: Single-player, Multiplayer
- Arcade system: Roxor

In the Groove (abbreviated ITG) is a rhythm game developed and published by Roxor Games. The game was shown in an official beta-testing preview on July 9, 2004, and was officially released in arcades around August 30, 2004. A PlayStation 2 port of In the Groove was released on June 17, 2005, by RedOctane. A sequel, In the Groove 2, was released in 2005.

== Gameplay ==
The gameplay mechanics of In the Groove are very similar to Konami's Dance Dance Revolution series, involving stepping in time to the general rhythm or beat of a song using a four-arrowed dance pad. During normal gameplay, color arrows scroll upwards from the bottom of the screen and pass over a set of gray, stationary arrows near the top (referred to as "targets"). When the scrolling arrows overlap the stationary ones, the player must step on the corresponding arrow(s) on the dance platform. Longer arrows referred to as "Holds" must be held down for their entire length for them to count. "Rolls" (as introduced in In the Groove 2), which appear to be spiky, green and yellow holds, must be rapidly tapped (like a drumroll, hence the name) for them to count. Mines deduct score and health if a player's foot is on an arrow when they pass by the corresponding target arrow on-screen. If more than two arrows appear at the same time, the additional arrows are known as "Hands", as players would hit arrows with their hands to complete such steps, though hitting two arrows with one foot also typically works.

On the player's far side of the screen is a life bar. This is affected by the accuracy judgements the player receives for hitting (or missing) arrows. Most machines have the Auto-Fail feature turned off - that is, any player whose life bar empties during a song can still finish playing that song, but will be failed at its conclusion. All machines will immediately fail any player who stops hitting arrows long enough to accrue 30 misses in a row. Similar to other dancing games, the player is judged for how accurately they step relative to when they were supposed to step. From highest to lowest, possible judgements are "Fantastic," "Excellent," "Great," "Decent," "Way Off," and "Miss". For holds and rolls, if the player finishes the hold or roll successfully, they receive a "Yeah!" judgement. If not, the player receives a "Bad". In the middle of the screen, the game keeps track of a player's current "combo," which is the length of the player's most recent chain of good timing judgements. A player's combo carries over from one song to the next, typically ending at the conclusion of a credit. However, if the player utilizes a USB card to keep track of their scores, their combo will also carry over from one credit to the next. The game has safety nets for players on easy difficulties that allows them to play all of the songs on their credit without failing out. If the life bar is fully depleted during gameplay, the player fails the song (unless the fail at end of song setting is on), usually resulting in a game over. Otherwise, the player is taken to the Results Screen, which rates the player's performance with a letter grade and a percentage score, among other statistics.

Modifiers (also referred to as mods) change the display of how arrows and other items in a stepchart work. They include Speed Multipliers (to space out the position of the scrolling arrows so less can be seen at once), Perspective (to change the behavior of how arrows scroll, such as having slower-moving arrows at the top and faster-moving arrows at the bottom), and Note (to change the appearance of how arrows look; some Note options change the color of the arrow depending on the rhythm of the song).

=== Game modes ===
In the Groove offers different modes of gameplay, each with different rules on how songs are selected and played.

Dance Mode is the default mode of play. In this mode, a player chooses a number of individual songs to play (the default is three). After the songs are played, the game is over.

Marathon Mode is an extended mode of play. In this mode, a player chooses a predefined configuration of songs that may also have a predefined set of modifiers in order to make the songs more challenging to play. Marathon courses typically have four songs, although some have five songs.

Battle Mode is a specialized "versus" mode of play. Two players (or one player against the computer) play three individual songs of the same difficulty. During the song, successfully executed steps fill up a player's "power bar". When the power bar completely fills, a modifier is applied to the opposing player's side.

== Music ==
A total of 76 songs were available in the arcade and home versions of In the Groove. Some songs are exclusive to the home version for PC and Mac. Kyle Ward (also known as KaW, Inspector K, Banzai, E-Racer, and Smiley) is the developer's house musician, who composed many of the songs. Another 56 artists can be found in the series.

== Home versions ==
Two home versions of In the Groove were released. The first was released for the PlayStation 2 on June 17, 2005, and was published by RedOctane. The PS2 version contains the Novice mode carried over from In the Groove 2, Liquid Moon as a fully playable track, and 4 songs from the sequel. A PC version was released on August 16, 2006, featuring 3 songs from the now-canceled In the Groove 3, widescreen aspect ratio support, and Edit Mode. A patch named Song Pack A was later released adding the songs and theme from In the Groove 2.

In the home version, as the player progresses in the game by clearing a certain number of songs, more modifiers, marathon courses, and songs are unlocked.

== Litigation ==
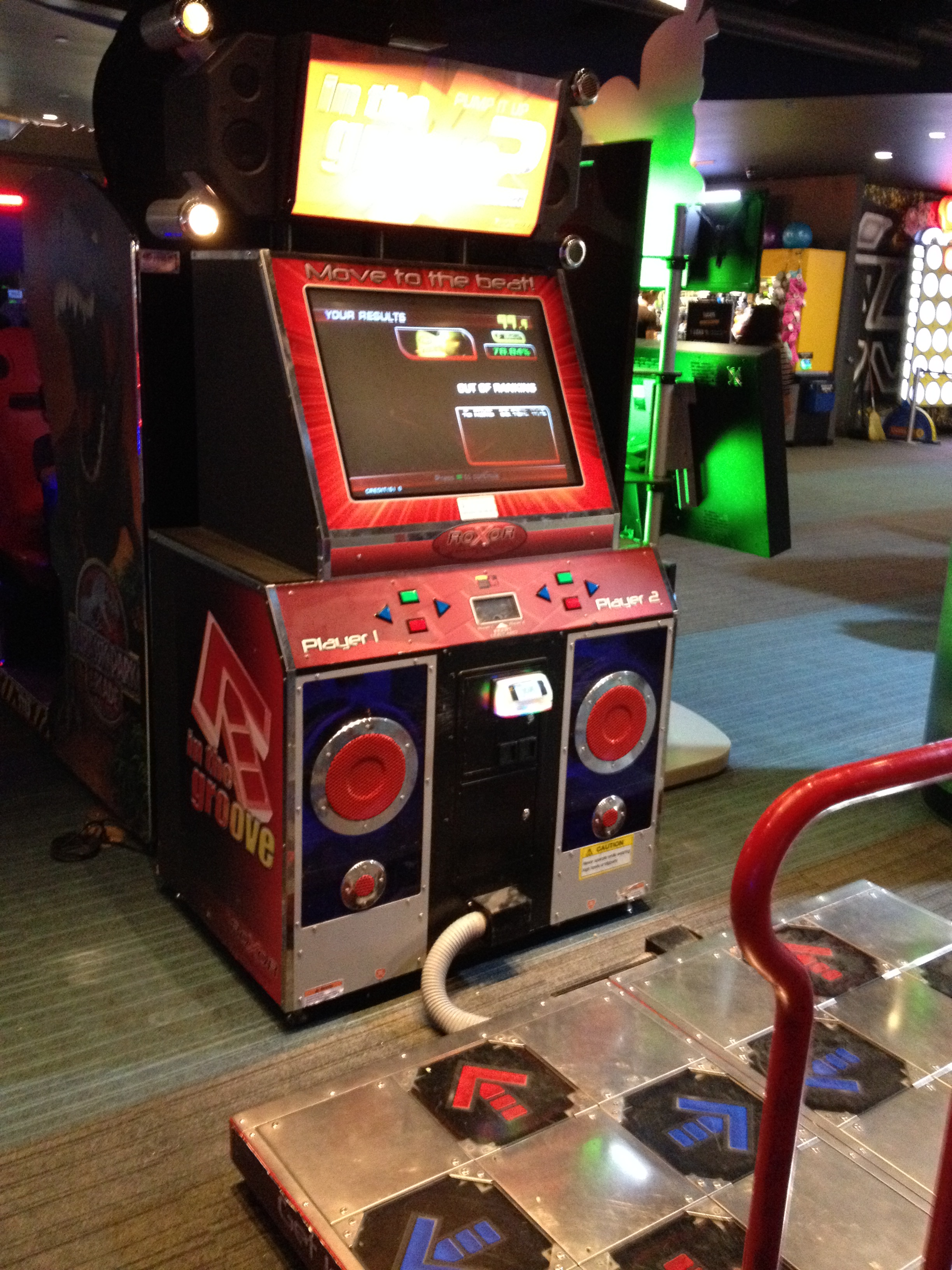
In the Groove arcade cabinet at West Edmonton Mall

Konami filed a lawsuit against Roxor Games on an infringement of various rights on May 9, 2005, in the Eastern District of Texas. The initial complaint alleged patent infringement, federal trademark infringement, false advertising and unfair competition, trade dress infringement, and federal and state trademark dilution. It primarily claimed that Roxor has infringed Konami's dancing game patent rights, but also went on to claim that the refitting of arcade cabinets "has been done in an infringing and unfair way".

On July 1, 2005, Konami amended their complaint to include the dance game "MC Groovz Dance Craze" (a game produced by Mad Catz to accompany their 3rd party dance mat). On July 10, 2005, the complaint got amended again to include the PS2 home version of the game and its publisher RedOctane.

On July 25, 2005, Roxor Games filed a counterclaim against Konami. In the counterclaim, Roxor denies the claims in Konami's complaint, stating that 'In The Groove' does not violate patent law and that claiming that Konami has engaged in unfair competition.

However, the lawsuit ultimately ended in a settlement. On August 7, 2006, the Court issued a Markman order construing the patent claims disputed by the parties. The meaning of the claims adopted by the court were, almost without exception, favorable to Konami, so on October 18, 2006, Roxor announced that Konami had acquired the intellectual property rights to the In the Groove series as part of the settlement to this litigation. The musicians and developers of the game would later go on to create Pump it Up Pro, a spinoff of the Pump it Up series featuring music and features from ITG.

== See also ==
- In the Groove 2
- Roxor Games
- StepMania
