= World Pump Festival =

Competitive Pump It Up tournament series

- Current season, competition or edition: World Pump Festival 2016
- Sport: eSports
- Founded: 2005; 21 years ago
- Owner: Andamiro
- Countries: Korea; Indonesia; Japan; United States; Mexico; Thailand; Bolivia; Malaysia; Philippines; Peru
- Website: PIU Game's official WPF page

World Pump Festival, better known as World Pump It Up Festival or WPF, is a competition and event focusing on the dance game Pump It Up which takes place in various time slots. Pump It Up is a Korean game that requires physical movement of the feet. The game is open for breakdancing, and many people have accomplished this feat by memorizing the steps and creating dance moves to hit the arrows on time. What separates this from other Machine dance tournaments is the large amount of prize money on offer and national qualifiers around the world.

At WPF, the best technical and freestyle players are flown from several countries to compete in their respective categories: Speed and Freestyle. As of 2006, a Female Speed category was introduced. The candidates are selected by tournaments held in their respective country by Supporters and Club Leaders - Members of the Pump community who work unpaid for Andamiro, organise tournaments and social events during the year. As well as the competition itself, Andamiro takes players and spectators on a tour of the host country, as a form of tourism aiming to promote the game as a sport for weight loss using videogames and Korean culture to create friendship between players. Previous locations of WPF have been held in Korea at G Star, Lotte World and more recently, Mexico City. Nationals (qualifiers for WPF) in Mexico and Brazil have been held in sports stadiums.

Competitors in the freestyle category incorporate elements of locking, salsa, funk styles, popping, hip hop dance, breakdance, street dance and other types of dance and theatrical movements into performances. It has become the norm to make a routine using choreography while facing the audience.

Andamiro provides a round trip flight, hotel, meals, transportation and tour at WPF for national winners. Spectators wishing to travel also have accommodation and most expenses covered.

== Tournament categories ==
NOTE: Players can ONLY compete in 1 division!

=== Speed ===
Players will achieve the highest score possible. Technical players focus on timing and pattern reading during gameplay, while minimizing combo breaking because combo breaking will disrupt the multiplier. Speed entrants (both in the male and female category) will practice the game on the most difficult songs/highest difficulty levels in an attempt to perfect their scores. The following rounds are as follows:

	MEN	WOMEN
Preliminary	Single 17-19	Single 15–17
Quarterfinal	Single 20-23	Single 18–20
Semifinal	Double 21-23	Double 18–20
Final (Best 2 of 3)	Double 24+	Double 21–23

=== Freestyle ===
Pump players will choose to incorporate complex or flashy techniques into their play movements, and develop intricate dance routines to perform during a song. Freestyle players tend to choose songs on lower difficulty levels or Freestyle-based Performance Charts designed for it, so that the player is not restricted in their movements by large quantities of required steps. Freesylers can choose between performing solo or have a partner involved. This category contains 2 rounds: Preliminary and final (Top 8 or Top 4). The scorecard are as follows:

Category	Points	Notes
Dance & Skill	55	Overall performance, including the execution, flow, synchronization, power moves, etc.
Apparel & Makeup	20	Costume and props.
Machine Score	15	Letter grade. CAUTION: An 'F' will result in an auto-Disqualification.
Judge's Evaluation	10	Miscellaneous. Includes the use of the song in the latest installment, creativity, and crowd reaction.
Total	100	Total points

== Supporters and clubs ==
A Supporter is a person who is the main point of contact between their respective country and Andamiro Korea. Any events and tournaments held require a written report with photos/videos sent to Andamiro, in exchange for prizes and recognition of athletes to enter WPF. A Club Leader is the person in charge of their respective club and should use their best efforts to maintain a close relationship with their Supporter. Clubs are normally (but not exclusively) town specific and focus on events in their area. As of 2007 a minimum of 10 officially recognised clubs are required per country to validate them for WPF (150 club members). Excellent club organisers can be designated as jurors in competitions for selecting national team members and also the WPF competition itself. If this is the case, Andamiro pays for all WPF jurors expenses, like WPF athletes. Andamiro gives prize money two times a year to the club's treasurer for club activities. Members who make a forum post, upload a picture/video or high score for the home/arcade versions of the game receive points. These can be exchanged in the online store for T-shirts, Sweatbands, Visors, CD's/DVD's and signed MP3 players by Banya (musical group).

== History ==
=== World Pump Festival 2005 ===
This was the first year Andamiro hosted its first-ever World Pump Festival. This was hosted in Korea. The primary machine used for this was Pump It Up Exceed 2. The total prize offered was $129,000.

=== World Pump Festival 2006 ===
World Pump Festival returns to Korea. The primary machine used for this was Pump It Up Zero. Female Speed was introduced to the competition, while removing Battle Station as part of their lineup. The total prize offered was $146,000.

=== World Pump Festival 2007 ===
The biggest change with World Pump Festival was the move to Mexico. The primary machine used for this was Pump It Up NX. The total prize offered was $148,000. This is the last World Pump Festival to consistently be annual as the next one wasn't until 2011.

=== World Pump Festival 2011 ===
After a long 3 year Hiatus, in 2010 Andamiro began hinting at WPF 2011, with the new release of "PIU Fiesta EX". Fiesta EX is the official version used in WPF 2011 and used a "Random for WPF" channel ver. WPF2011 was held in China, August 25–27, 2011 / GTI Game Show in Guangzhou.

The biggest change in this event was allowing the use of the bar for all divisions, primarily Male Speed. Previously, bar was prohibited until this event, drastically changing the landscape of the competition. Because Fiesta removed the traditional difficulties (Crazy and Nightmare), they are replaced with actual difficulty numbers, making navigation easier (See Speed above).

=== World Pump Festival 2016 ===
Upon the release of Pump It Up Prime, World Pump Festival was announced both in the pamphlet and credits in the machine. The year of the festival was changed from 2015 to 2016.

On February 23, Andamiro released the official ruleset for the upcoming WPF.

A video on April 18, 2016, confirmed that World Pump Festival will take place at Bali, Indonesia on July 23, 2016.

Andamiro has released full details of WPF 2016:

- Host Country: Indonesia
- Place of competition: LIPPO MALL Kuta, Denpasar Bali
- Date: July 24, 2016
- Category: Speed (Male and Female), Freestyle
- Total prize: USD $18,000
- Accommodation: Aston Hotel Kuta

Announced at this WPF was Pump It Up PRIME 2, scheduled for a November 2016 release.

== Results ==
=== 2016 Finals Details ===
Results:

Winning Country: Mexico
Rank	SPEED Male	SPEED Female	FREESTYLE	Notes
(gold) 1st	Mexico; Luis Angel Remigio Garcia (Angel de Toluca)	(Peru) Peru; Lizeth Carolina Sánchez Blas (LIZZZZZY)	(Japan) Japan; Kyoko TAKAMOTO (RIRI); Shingo TAKAMOTO (PANDA) -Panda-san team-	TBA
(silver) 2nd	(Bolivia) Bolivia; Santos Colque Guarachi (Anitamor)	(Mexico) Mexico; Surya Salgado Camarena (Sury)	(Indonesia) Indonesia; Zegha Brasesa Budhy (K4ZEMURA); Muhammad Hafidz Alfikri (NU7TYRYU)	TBA
(bronze) | 3rd	(South Korea) South Korea; Yoon Sang Yeon (FEFEMZ)	(Bolivia) Bolivia; Dora Lavinia Rojas Llampara (ldanger)	(Indonesia) Indonesia; Nugraha Arianto Putra (RAHADIAN)	TBA

4th Place and everything else TBA.

Entries List:

Winning Country: TBD
Country	SPEED Male	SPEED Female	FREESTYLE
South Korea	Yoon Sang Yeon (FEFEMZ)	Kim Da Young (PENGUIN)	N/A
Indonesia	Christ Yeremias Kondorura	Ines Bestari	Nugraha Arianto Putra
Indonesia	Budi Hermawan	Charissa Olivia	Zegha Brasesa Budhy; Muhammad Hafidz Alfikri
Indonesia	Adhe Kresna Pustiadi	Charissa Olivia	Yohanes Grady Irawan; Aditya Satriadi
Japan	Yudai Tsujino (YUDAI_JP)	N/A	Kyoko TAKAMOTO (RIRI); Shingo TAKAMOTO (PANDA) -Panda-san team-
(United States) U.S.A.	jboy (JBOY)	Lara Gardner (PIGGYPIG)	Melvin Soliman Rubio (Rubio); Tony Teon Dortch (Paraboi2)
Mexico	Luis Angel Remigio Garcia (Angel de Toluca)	Surya Salgado Camarena (Sury)	Emmanuel Lopez Arteaga (Zhaydragon); Lissette Vásquez Sánchez (Kasumi)
Thailand	Nutchapon Thonoi (ICEKUNGX)	Sompong Lerkpichai (AIMMILY)	Kawin Suksathan (NNEWW); Kanch Kruasuwan (SONATAR)
Thailand	Wachirawit Chatwiriyacharoen (CONAN)	Sompong Lerkpichai (AIMMILY)	Kawin Suksathan (NNEWW); Kanch Kruasuwan (SONATAR)
Bolivia	Santos Colque Guarachi (Anitamor)	Dora Lavinia Rojas Llampara (ldanger)	Juan Pablo Laime Apaza (JP RAY); José Georgino Laime Apaza (GEORG1NO)
Malaysia	Chin Yun Wei (NextCrazy)	N/A	N/A
Philippines	N/A	Patricia De Guia (HIKARI27)	N/A
Peru	Junior Harold Ninalaya Espejo (PKOO)	Lizeth Carolina Sánchez Blas (LIZZZZZY)	David Eloy Villafuerte Sosa (Nando); Jorge Luis Rivera Euchiaga (Buho)

Note: All sections listed as "N/A" did not meet minimum requirements to qualify for WPF or did not manage to travel for WPF.

=== 2011 Results ===
Winning Country: South Korea
Rank	SPEED Male	SPEED Female	FREESTYLE
(gold) 1st	(South Korea) South Korea; Sooseck Ryoo	(Peru) Peru; Lizeth Sánchez (LIZZZZZY)	(Korea) Korea; Daecheon Kim; Kisuk Kim
(silver) 2nd	(Chile) Chile; Alejandro Daniel Rios Ortiz (Xuma)	(Ecuador) Ecuador; Rafaela Calderón	(Brazil) Brazil; Fabricio Rangel Velloso Orsolin (Faber); Lucas Rodrigues de Souza Barros (Legal)
(bronze) | 3rd	(China) China; Yi Qiu	(Mexico) Mexico; Priscilla Sánchez (Priska)	(Ecuador) Ecuador; Alberto Gil Gutierrez; Gia Alexandra Gil Gutierrez
4th	(Indonesia) Indonesia; Ryoku Hafiz Lazuardi	(Korea) Korea; Hee Jung Jang	(China) China; Lei Liang Zhang; Peng Zhou

=== 2007 Results ===
Winning Country: South Korea
Rank	SPEED Male	SPEED Female	FREESTYLE
(gold) 1st	(Chile) Chile; Alejandro Daniel Rios Ortiz (Xuma)	(Taiwan) Taiwan; Shen Shiou-Hwa (Amy Shen)	(Korea) Korea; Dae Cheon Kim; Go Seok
(silver) 2nd	(Ecuador) Ecuador; Carlos Enrique Monar Ormeño (Kike)	(Mexico) Mexico; Rosario Nayeli Garcia Aragon (Nayeli)	(Korea) Korea; Kyeong Seok Seo; Kyungho Kim (Lee Cein)
(bronze) | 3rd	(United States) USA jboy	(Chile) Chile; Celia Margarita Escudero Castillo (Celia)	(Ecuador) Ecuador; Los Garotos
4th	(El Salvador) El Salvador; Walner Manuel Hernandez	(Argentina) Argentina; Daniela Mohamed (Danielita)	(El Salvador) El Salvador; Walner; José Luis
5th	(Mexico) Mexico; Armando Zamudio Verduzco (El Wero)	(United States) USA Lara Gardner (PIGGYPIG)	(Colombia) Colombia; Aura Sofía (Sophie); Luis Alberto (Jam)
6th	(Taiwan) Taiwan; Yiang Shu Cheng	(Mexico) Mexico; Priscilla Sánchez (Priska)	(Italy) Italy; Rocco Mendola (Geko)
7th	(Italy) Italy; Roberto Pedroni (Lion)	(Mexico) Mexico; Carmen Torres	(Chile) Chile; Kuest; Palta
8th	(Spain) Spain; Christian Cruselles Castaño (Yota)	(Korea) Korea; Heejung Jang	(Mexico) Mexico; Marco Antonio Burgos; Jesus Alberto
9th	(Korea) Korea; Chang Lee		(Argentina) Argentina; Leandro Manuel González; Gastón Lasarte
10th	(Colombia) Colombia; Diego Castro Vargas (Degok)		(Brazil) Brazil; RKW

=== 2006 Results ===
Winning Country: Mexico
Rank	SPEED Male	SPEED Female	FREESTYLE
(gold) 1st	(Mexico) Mexico; Armando Zamudio Verduzco (El Wero)	(Mexico) Mexico; Rosario Nayeli Garcia Aragon (Nayeli)	(Korea) Korea; Lee Cein; Suo Kyoung Suk
(silver) 2nd	(Mexico) Mexico; Victor Lara Perez (El Gorras)	(Argentina) Argentina; Daniela Mohamed (Danielita)	(Brazil) Brazil; Fabricio Rangel Velloso (Faber) Orsolin; Lucas Rodrigues (Legal)
(bronze) | 3rd	(Korea) Korea; Chang Lee	(Korea) Korea; Kim Mi Hee	(Colombia) Colombia; Diego Castro Vargas (Degok); Kaori Sanmiguel (Kaori)
4th	(South Korea) South Korea; Choi Kwon Sik (Windforce)	(Brazil) Brazil; Sabrina Freire (Sabruta)	(Mexico) Mexico; Flor Amelia Carrera Villabazo; Omar Hatzel Salazar (Simba)
5th	(Chile) Chile; Alejandro Daniel Rios Ortiz (Xuma)	(Chile) Chile; Celia Margarita Escudero Castillo (Celia)	(Malaysia) Malaysia; Tan Kean Kiat; Tan Yew Seng
6th	(Argentina) Argentina; Ignacio Julian Veliz Martin (Nacho)	(Taiwan) Taiwan; Shen Shiou-Hwa (Amy Shen)	(United States) USA; James DeVito (Smidget); Rick Huber (Redviper)
7th	(Ecuador) Ecuador; Carlos Monar	(Peru) Peru; Gisella Tolentino Diestro	(Ecuador) Ecuador; Andres Rivadeneira
8th	(United States) USA jboy	(Korea) Korea; Lee Hyang Jin	(Italy) Italy; Matteo Favarelli; Mouhcine Elkhanfari
9th	(Brazil) Brazil; Saka		

=== 2005 Results ===
Winning Country: Mexico
Rank	SPEED	BATTLE STATION	FREESTYLE
(gold) 1st	(Korea) Korea; Chang Lee	(Mexico) Mexico; Erik Kyre	(Mexico) Mexico; Flor Amelia Carrera Villabazo; Omar Hatzel Salazar (Simba)
(silver) 2nd	(Mexico) Mexico; Armando Zamudio Verduzco (El Wero)	(Argentina) Argentina; Raul Jimenez	(Brazil) Brazil; Lucas Rodrigues; Souza Barros (Legal)
(bronze) | 3rd	TIE (United States) USA Rick Huber (Redviper) (Mexico) Mexico; Miguel Martinez Lugo (Prey)		(Korea) Korea; Ye-Won Song (Yuri-Yuki); Hyo-Jeong Kim (Yuki-Yuri)
9th	Brazil Jorge Vergueiro Machado (Takahashi)		(Brazil) Brazil; Thiago Ferreira de Campos (Black)

== See also ==
- Street dance
- Breakdance
- Exergaming
- Music video game
