= Frets on Fire =

2006 video game

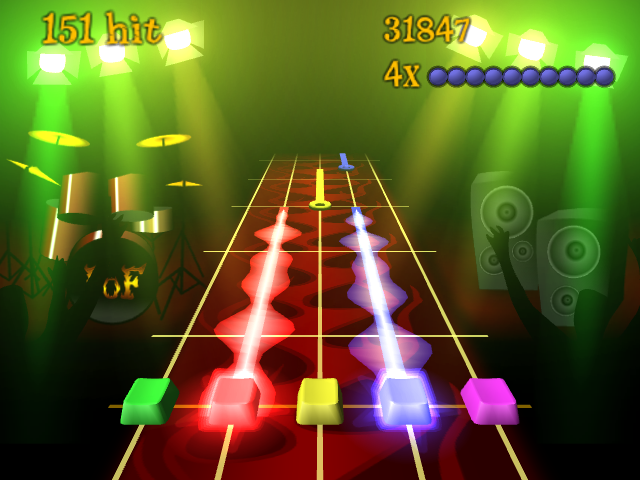
- Frets on Fire gameplay
- Developer(s): Unreal Voodoo
- Designer(s): Sami Kyöstilä
- Artist(s): Joonas Kerttula
- Engine: Pygame
- Platform(s): Microsoft Windows, Mac OS X, Linux
- Release: 3 August 2006 (debut release); 5 November 2008 (latest version)
- Genre(s): Music
- Mode(s): Single-player, multiplayer (in more recent versions)

Frets on Fire (FoF) is a free, open-source music video game created by Finnish independent video game developer Unreal Voodoo. Players use the keyboard to play along with markers which appear on screen, with the aim to score points, achieve a high point multiplier, and complete a song. Frets on Fire was the winner of the Assembly 2006 game development competition.

== Development ==
The game is written in the Python programming language, and is licensed under the GNU General Public License, although the game incorporates other free and open-source code under other licenses. The game's included song files and some internal fonts are proprietary, and their redistribution is not permitted outside of the Frets on Fire executable.

== Gameplay ==
The Frets on Fire mascot "Jurgen", described by the developers as an "Elvis Costello look-a-like posing with keyboard"

Frets on Fire is a music playing video game. It is playable on Microsoft Windows, Mac OS X, and Linux. The player presses buttons in time to coloured markers, which appear on-screen, the markers are matched with the rhythm of the music. Frets on Fire can be played by using a keyboard by pressing the fret buttons and pick buttons, although there is support for joysticks, meaning that with the appropriate adapter and/or software, various guitar-type controllers can be used as well.

== Features ==
Frets on Fire includes a built-in song editor (or "fretting" tool) that allows editing and creation of songs. This allows users to customise their own tracks. Other programs include EOF (EditorOnFire), dB (Feedback), and Freetar editors. MIDI sequences created in programs such as FL Studio and REAPER can also be used. The Frets on Fire Wiki has an extensive resource of custom song frets. There are also many other sites that have been created to provide songs and other resources for the game. Frets on Fire also allows users to import songs from other guitar games, such as Guitar Hero, Guitar Hero II and Guitar Hero Encore: Rocks the 80s. The game also features a tutorial, which lets users unfamiliar with the gameplay get accustomed to the game. While the game contains a keyboard play mode, USB joysticks can also be used and this allows use of regular joysticks and guitar controllers.

Since version 1.2.438, the game features hammer-on and pull-off notes, commonly abbreviated to HOPO, although the game refers to them as "tappable notes". These notes allows the player to press only its fret button to play if the previous note was played correctly, emulating the feature of the Guitar Hero series. Frets on Fire lacks the ability to allow players to use the whammy bar, while FoFiX has basic support for modulating the pitch of a track. This is referred to as either "Killswitch" or "Pitchbend" and was added in the 3.100 update for FoFiX.

Much like console guitar-style games, Frets on Fire comes with World Charts, an official online high score list, but since the entire system is open source, players have the ability to host their own server as well.

== Alternate versions ==
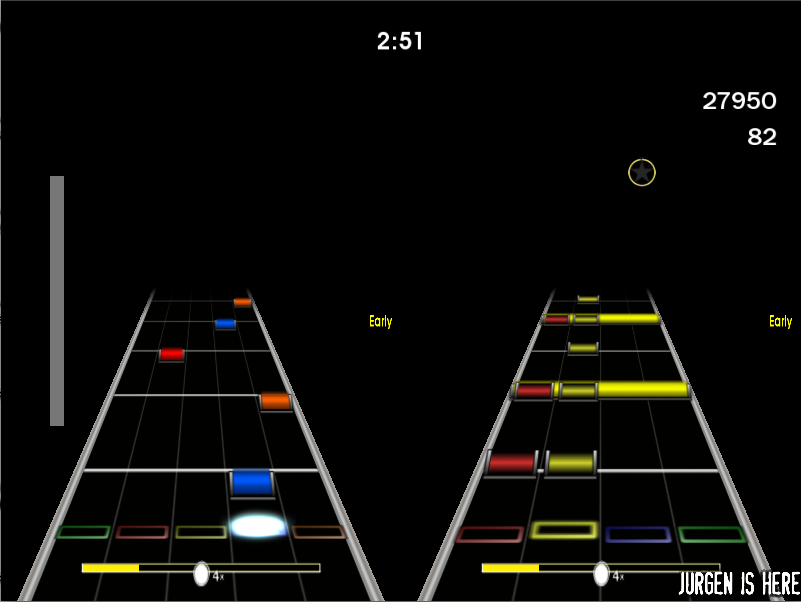
A song being played in Frets on Fire X (using the Megalight Rock Band Style Theme)

One popular version of the game is Frets on Fire X (commonly abbreviated FoFiX), a fork developed from a series of mods of version 1.2.451 of Frets on Fire. As well as having support for four players, this fork supports custom graphical themes (which enables users to create a Guitar Hero or Rock Band look-alike), bass and drum tracks and preliminary support for lyrics. The latest stable version of FoFiX is 3.123 released on December 16, 2021. Currently in development for version 4.000 is the inclusion of online multiplayer, Video Background Support, and support for both Guitar Hero and Rock Band styles of play.

== Reception and impact ==
Frets on Fire has received generally positive reviews in a variety of publications. Released for competition at Assembly, it won first place among its competition. Because of the cross-platform nature of the game, it has garnered fans from both Linux and Mac.

The University of Nevada developed a modified version of Frets on Fire called Blind Hero which uses a haptic glove to make this game accessible to players who are visually impaired.

Frets on Fire became a popular open-source game; the game was downloaded between 2007 and May 2017 alone in SourceForge.net over 14 million times.

== See also ==
- Clone Hero – 2017 video game
- List of open-source games
