= Euphoria (disambiguation) =

Euphoria is an emotional and mental state defined as a sense of great happiness and well-being.

Euphoria may also refer to:

== Biology ==
- Euphoria (beetle), a genus of scarab beetles
- Euphoria, a genus name previously used for the longan and other trees

== Music ==
=== Groups ===
- Euphoria (American band), a folk-rock/sunshine pop band from New York, or their eponymous 1969 album
- Euphoria (Australian band), a 1990s Australian pop/dance trio
- Euphoria (Canadian band), an active Canadian dance music project, or their eponymous 1999 album
- Euphoria (Indian band), an active Indian rock group formed in 1989
- Eu Phoria, a Japanese all-girl pop/rock band formed in 2002

=== Albums ===
- Euphoria (Claire Richards album), 2023
- Euphoria (CNBLUE album), 2016
- Euphoria (Dead Man album) or the title song, 2008
- Euphoria (Def Leppard album), 1999
- Euphoria (Enrique Iglesias album), 2010
- Euphoria (Leftover Salmon album) or the title song, 1997
- Euphoria (Ruslana album), 2012
- Euphoria (Vinnie Vincent album) or the title song, 1997
- Euphoria (compilations), a dance-music series, 1999–2004
- Euphoria, by Surfact, 2009
- Euphoria (Original Score from the HBO Series), by Labrinth, 2019
- Euforia (La Mafia album), 1998
- Euforia – Helen Sjöholm sjunger Billy Joel, or the title song, by Helen Sjöholm, 2010

=== Songs ===
- "Euphoria" (Angels & Airwaves song), 2021
- "Euphoria" (BTS song), 2018
- "Euphoria" (Kendrick Lamar song), 2024
- "Euphoria" (Loreen song), Swedish entry and winner of Eurovision 2012
- "Euphoria" (The Perry Twins song), 2018
- "Euphoria" (Usher song), 2012
- "Euphoria", by Collide from Some Kind of Strange, 2003
- "Euphoria", by DJ Tiësto from Parade of the Athletes, 2004
- "Euphoria", by Don Toliver from Heaven or Hell, 2020
- "Euphoria", by Killing Joke from Pylon, 2015
- "Euphoria", by Kyle Ward from the video game series In the Groove
- "Euphoria", by Muse from Will of the People, 2022
- "Euphoria", by Sarah Slean from The Baroness, 2008
- "Euphoria", by Sirenia from An Elixir for Existence, 2004
- "Euphoria', by Silent Planet from Superbloom, 2023
- "Euphoria", by W.A.S.P. from Unholy Terror, 2001
- "Euphoria", by the Youngbloods from Earth Music, 1968
- "Euphoria", by the Holy Modal Rounders from their self-titled first album, 1964
- "Euphoria (Firefly)", by Delerium from Karma, 1997
- "Euphoria", by Michael Jackson from Music & Me, 1973
- "Euforia" (song), 2023, by Annalisa

== Film and television ==
- Euphoria (2006 film), a 2006 Russian dramatic film by Ivan Vyrypaev
- Euphoria (2017 film), by Swedish director Lisa Langseth
- Euphoria (2018 film), a 2018 Italian film
- Euphoria (2026 film), a 2026 Indian film
- Euphoria (Israeli TV series), a 2012–2013 Israeli television series
- Euphoria (American TV series), a 2019 American series based on the Israeli series
- "Euphoria (Part 1)" and "Euphoria (Part 2)" (2006), a two-part episode of the American television series House
- Eufòria, a Catalan music talent show

== Computing ==
- Euphoria (software), a game animation engine software by NaturalMotion
- Euphoria (programming language), an interpreted programming language

== Sports ==
- New York Euphoria (formerly "Team Euphoria"), a team in the Lingerie Football League
- WWC Euphoria, an event of World Wrestling Council
- Euforia (wrestler) (born 1974), Mexican professional wrestler

== Others ==
- 4-Methylaminorex (commonly known as "Euphoria" or "U4EA"), a stimulant drug with effects comparable to methamphetamine
- Euphoria, fictional state of the US, home to Euphoric State University in David Lodge's novel Changing Places
- Euphoria (King novel), 2014
- Euphoria (visual novel)

== See also ==
- Euphoric (disambiguation)
- Euphorbia, a plant genus
- UFOria, 1985 American comedy film
- Uforia Audio Network, American radio network
- Ufouria: The Saga, 1991 video game
