= Music of In the Groove =

The music of In the Groove includes 136 songs for arcade and home releases. A few additional songs were confirmed to be present in the now-cancelled In the Groove 3. Some artists are common to Dance Dance Revolution. In fact, a few song revivals can be found in In the Groove, but with different stepcharts.

== Lists of songs ==
An easier Novice difficulty offers charts at level 1 for all songs in both games. This difficulty is exclusive to Single and 2 Player modes. It is comparable to Beginner from Dance Dance Revolution, although Beginner is occasionally higher than level 1.

Note the numbers given for each difficulty level are similar to DDR's 1-10 "footers", except In The Groove removed the "footer" label and added 3 additional difficulty levels, which aim to have harder stepcharts than the hardest 10-footer songs in DDR. Therefore, a 10-footer in ITG is comparable to a 10-footer in DDR. If one actually counts the number of boxes showing the difficulty, one will notice there are only 12 boxes. Songs with 13-footer difficulty levels are extremely hard songs for advanced players of In The Groove. Only one 13-footer song exists for In The Groove 1, while two other songs of this difficulty level are included in the sequel.

Songs from In The Groove 1 and In The Groove 2 by Kyle A. Ward (which include ones by his stage names Smiley (☺), Inspector K, Kbit, and Banzai) can be found on his studio album Synthsations which is available for digital download. Songs from In The Groove 3 by him can be found on his other studio album Urban Comatose, also available as a digital download, with the exception of Frozen Fire, released on his earlier Synthsations album.

=== In The Groove ===
This list covers the 72 songs available in both the arcade and home versions of In The Groove, plus the four In The Groove 2 previews available in the PlayStation 2, PC and Mac OS X versions of In The Groove. All 76 songs are also available in the arcade sequel, In The Groove 2. 21 of them can also be played in StepManiaX.

In The Groove for PC and Mac require the Song Pack A expansion pack to unlock the Expert difficulty on some charts.

Title	Artist	BPM	SMX	SMX add date
Anubis	Banzai	110	Yes	July 25, 2020
Bend Your Mind	Reflection Theory	140		
Boogie Down	Inurvise	175		
Bouff	Machinae Supremacy	200		
Bubble Dancer	Crispy	137		
Changes	Sandy Rivera & Haze	125		
Charlene	Missing Heart	138	Yes	February 27, 2021
Crazy	DJ Doo	135		
Da Roots (Folk Mix)	Mind Reflection	89-134	Yes	August 17, 2018
Dawn	KaW	138		
Delirium	☺	163-280	Yes	February 27, 2021
Disconnected	Inspector K	200		
Disconnected ~Hyper~	Inspector K	195		
Disconnected ~Mobius~	Inspector K	88-175		
DJ Party	BB Hayes	130	Yes	August 23, 2024
Do U Love Me	DJ Doo	133	Yes	February 16, 2020
Don't Promise Me	Reflection Theory	66-132		
Don't Promise Me ~Happiness~	Reflection Theory	66-132		
Dreams of Passion	Dax	97		
Drifting Away	Filo Bedo	143	Yes	August 17, 2018
Driving Force Classical	Digital Explosion	168		
Euphoria	KaW feat. ☺	70-140		
Fly Away	Missing Heart	138		
Fly With Me	Nina	29-137		
Flying High	Filo Bedo	146	Yes	August 17, 2018
Funk Factory	Money Deluxe	132		
Hand of Time	Reflection Theory	92-184		
Hardcore of the North	Digital Explosion	110-169		
Hip Hop Jam	Indiggo	194	Yes	February 27, 2021
Hybrid	Machinae Supremacy	185		
I Think I Like That Sound †	Kid Whatever	131	Yes	August 17, 2018
I'll Get There Anyway	Sammi Morelli	100		
Incognito	Inspector K	150		
Infection	Inspector K	170		
July	☺	170		
Kagami	KaW	73-146	Yes	February 27, 2021
Kiss Me Red	Crispy	137		
Land of the Rising Sun	Spacekats	136	Yes	August 17, 2018
Lemmings on the Run	E-Rotic	134	Yes	November 16, 2022
Let Me Be The One	Sammi Morelli	123		
Let My Love Go Blind	Nina	160		
Liquid Moon^{**}	Inspector K	160		
Mellow	Spacekats	160	Yes	January 9, 2019
Mouth	Rochelle	134		
My Favourite Game	Natalie Browne	68-136		
Mythology	Digital Explosion	138		
No 1 Nation	Anet	200		
Normal	Anet	141		
Not Worth The Paper	Dax	133		
Oasis	KaW	145		
On A Day Like Today	Obsession	134		
PA Theme	MC Frontalot	142		
Pandemonium	ZiGZaG	330		
Perfect	Sammi Morelli	100		
Queen of Light	Missing Heart	132	Yes	June 29, 2021
Remember December	Mind Reflection	192	Yes	Launch
ROM-eo & Juli8	Nina	135	Yes	August 17, 2018
Solina	Evolution	129		
Tell	Symphonius w/Rossini	163		
Tension	Inspector K	85-180		
The Beginning	DJ Doo	132	Yes	February 16, 2020
The Game	Crispy	138		
Torn	Natalie Browne	128		
Touch Me	E-Rotic	138		
Tough Enough ‡	Vanilla Ninja	98–196		
Tribal Style	KaW	140		
Turn It On	Georgetown	120		
Utopia	☺	88-166	Yes	February 16, 2020
VerTex	ZiGZaG	60-612		
Wake Up	Kid Whatever	?		
Walking on Fire (Blank & Jones Remix)	Evolution feat. Jayn Hanna	138		
Which MC Was That?	MC Frontalot	111		
While Tha Rekkid Spinz	DJ Zombie	140	Yes	August 17, 2018
Why Me	Desire	126	Yes	August 20, 2025
Xuxa	☺	160	Yes	February 16, 2020
Zodiac	Banzai	107	Yes	Launch
† This song is listed as "That Sound" exclusively in the original arcade release. ‡ This song is available in DDR Ultramix 2 and the arcade version of Dancing Stage Fusion.

^**In the arcade version of In The Groove, this song can only be played in the Energy course in the Marathon game mode. It is an unlockable song in the home version of In The Groove (it can be played as a regular song when unlocked and isn't exclusive to the Energy course) and is fully playable in the sequel In The Groove 2. It is also used as the game mode selection, song group selection, marathon mode course selection, and option menu music in the home version of the first In The Groove game in the series. It is used as the warning screen music in the PC/Mac version of In The Groove 2. However, in these parts of the game, the song has been clipped.

==== Unlockables ====
Songs completed		Reward
PS2	PC/Mac	Reward
10	5	"Disconnected ~Hyper~"
20	10	Bounce marathon
30	15	"Tell"
40	20	Bumpy modifier
50	25	"Anubis"
60	30	Outer World marathon
70	35	"Bubble Dancer"
80	40	Beat modifier
90	45	"Disconnected -Mobius Mix-"
100	50	"Liquid Moon"
110	55	"Don't Promise Me ~Happiness Comes Mix~"
120	70	"Funk Factory"
	60	Vivid modifier
130	65	"DJ Party"
140	115	"Tribal Style"
150	75	"Infection"
160	80	The Legend marathon
170	85	"Pandemonium"
180	90	"Incognito"
190	95	"Xuxa"
200	100	"Wake Up"
0	105	Robot modifier
	110	"Cryosleep"

=== In The Groove 2 ===
This list covers the 60 songs that are new to the arcade and home versions of In The Groove 2. The home version was only released on PC and Mac, and requires the installation of Song Pack A. Additionally, 29 of the songs from In The Groove 2 can be played in StepManiaX.

Title	Artist	BPM	SMX	SMX add date
Agent Blatant	Ernest + Julio	81-162	Yes	August 17, 2018
Amore	Uniq	72-143		
Baby Baby	Bambee	134		
Baby Don't You Want Me	Nina	135		
Birdie	Doolittle	68-136	Yes	Launch
Bloodrush	TeknoDred + Ad Man	79-158	Yes	August 17, 2018
Bumble Bee †	Bambee	138	Yes	April 3, 2020
Clockwork Genesis	Inspector K	175		
Cryosleep	Machinae Supremacy	69-137	Yes	May 1, 2021
D-Code	Dust Devil	100		
Destiny	☺	175	Yes	May 1, 2021
Determinator	Dust Devil	147	Yes	August 17, 2018
Disconnected -Disco-	Kid Whatever	139	Yes	August 17, 2018
Energizer	ZiGZaG	76-303	Yes	August 25, 2022
Fleadh Uncut	Parker/Stiles	131-132	Yes	August 17, 2018
Get Happy	Boom Boom Room	67-133		
Go 60 Go	Takoyaki	160	Yes	August 17, 2018
Habanera 1	Boom Boom Room	81-158		
Hardcore Symphony	Digital Explosion	174		
High	Digital Explosion	138		
Hillbilly Hardcore	Benga Boys	136		
Hispanic Panic	Chucho Merchan	140	Yes	August 17, 2018
Holy Guacamole	Chucho Merchan	140	Yes	August 17, 2018
Hustle Beach	Papa J	128		
Ize Pie	Headtwist & Pump	68-136	Yes	August 17, 2018
July -Euromix-	JS14	145	Yes	February 16, 2020
Know Your Enemy	Hybrid	130		
Life of a Butterfly	Nina	68-136		
Lipstick Kiss	Ernest + Julio	165		
Little Kitty Mine	Ni-Ni	139		
Monolith	Affinity	49-196	Yes	May 7, 2020
Music Pleeze	B. Dastardly	124		
My Life Is So Crazy	DJ Zombie	140	Yes	August 17, 2018
No Princess	Lynn	141	Yes	July 25, 2020
One False Move	Dust Devil	53-105		
Out of the Dark	Hybrid	136		
Pick Me Up & Tango	Nina	133		
Psalm Pilot	Jason Creasey	130	Yes	August 17, 2018
Reactor	Jason Creasey	125	Yes	August 17, 2018
Renaissance	☺	160		
Ride the Bass	DJ Zombie	138		
Robotix	Kbit	150		
Soapy Bubble	Fragmentz	141	Yes	August 17, 2018
Spaceman	Lynn	137	Yes	December 21, 2020
Spacy Crazy Girl	Ni-Ni	135		
Spin Chicken	Freebie & The Bean	124	Yes	August 17, 2018
Summer ~Speedy Mix~	☺	185	Yes	March 30, 2021
Summer in Belize	Digital Explosion	138		
Sunshine †	Triple J	170	Yes	June 13, 2019
Sweet World	Omega Men	132	Yes	June 13, 2019
Temple of Boom	Yannis Kamarinos	146	Yes	August 17, 2018
The Message	Ni-Ni	67-133		
This is Rock & Roll	DJ Zombie	140	Yes	August 17, 2018
Twilight	KaW	136		
Typical Tropical †	Bambee	137	Yes	May 7, 2020
VerTex²	ZiGZaG	88-555		
Visible Noise	Hybrid	132		
Vorsprung Durch -Techno-	Sly/Fly/Badman	100-132		
Wake Up	Kid Whatever	138		
Wanna Do ~Hardhouse Mix~	Nina	149		
We Know What To Do	Matiloe	140		
!	Onyx	155		
† indicates a song available in the Dance Dance Revolution series.
