= On Ice =

On Ice may refer to:

- On Ice (film), a 1935 Mickey Mouse cartoon
- On Ice (Bambee album), 1998
- On Ice (Machine Gun Fellatio album), 2004
- "On Ice", an episode of the TV series Counterstrike
- A phrase used in the names of various ice shows

== See also ==
- On the Ice, a 2011 American film
