= Feeding the Beast =

Studio album by Surfact
- Released: October 10, 2011

Surfact chronology
Euphoria (2009)	Feeding the Beast (2011)

Feeding the Beast is a 2011 album by Danish band Surfact. It was released in October 2011 in Denmark reaching #11 on the Danish Albums Chart in its first week of release.

It was rated a 7.5 out of 10 by Rock Hard.

== Track list ==
1. The Pace
2. Feeding The Beast
3. Before My Eyes
4. No Real You
5. Atmosphere
6. Higher Ground
7. The Step
8. Heartbeat
9. Taking You Over
10. Leave And Survive
11. Reset
12. When I Return
