= BanYa =

South Korean musical group

BanYa (반야), sometimes spelled BANYA or Banya, was the South Korean arcade game company Andamiro's musical group responsible for creating original songs for Pump It Up. The style of its music varies greatly, from hip hop to electronic, from rock to classical crossovers.

Classical remixes are among BanYa's most popular productions. Several sonatas, symphonies and other pieces feature in different versions. Mixing violins, guitars and heavy beats, these songs draw particular attention from players and passers-by. BanYa also composes original music including trance, techno, hardcore and ambient breaks.

Beginning in Pump It Up NX, former BanYa member Yahpp became a solo artist and in turn his new music became credited to him. Starting in Pump It Up Fiesta, Msgoon, another former member, did the same. All other former members, starting on NX, became credited as "BanYa Production". For consistency, all songs by the original BanYa collective are listed here.

== Song catalogue ==
The group's first two releases under the name of BanYa were Ignition Starts and Hypnosis, although Bee, Solitary and Final Audition had been already recorded by Yahpp as an independent artist. Up to 2004 they released 3 albums, however some nonstop remixes of several BanYa songs have also been made for Pump It Up.

On Pump It Up Exceed 2, Radezky Can Can was moved from the "K-Pop Channel" to the "BanYa Channel", even though it was made by F2 System, who worked with Andamiro to make Pump It Up Extra. Holiday, the other F2 song, has only showed up on Extra, The PREX and The PREX 2.

=== Pump It Up: The 1st Dance Floor ===
Title	Korean title	Genre	Notes
"Hypnosis"	"힙노시스"	Synthpop	Remix of Colin Kiddy's "Buzz" by De Wolfe Music.
"Ignition Starts"	"이그니션 스타츠"	Hardcore techno	Remix of Nigel Broad's "Ride On The Rhythm" by De Wolfe Music.

=== Pump It Up: The 2nd Dance Floor ===
Title	Korean title	Genre	Notes
"Creamy Skinny"	"크리미 스키니"	West Coast hip hop	Remix of Colin Kiddy's "Rapport" by De Wolfe Music.
"Extravaganza"	"엑스트라바간자"	Digital hardcore	Remix of "Burnin'" by Daft Punk.
"Final Audition"	"파이널 오디션"	Breakbeat	
"Hate"	"싫어" ("No")	Rap rock	Inspired by "Birthday Cake" by Cibo Matto.
"Koul"	"코울"	West Coast hip hop	Remix of "Slam It" and "Def Jam" by Network Music Ensemble.
"Techno Repeatorment" ("Repeatorment Remix")	"리피토먼트 리믹스"	Techno	Only available in Nonstop Remix mode.

=== Pump It Up The O.B.G: The 3rd Dance Floor ===
Title	Korean title	Genre	Notes
"An Interesting View"	"서울구경"	Synthpop	Cover version of "서울구경" by Seo Yeong Chun. Includes a sample from the 1954 film Godzilla.
"Close Your Eyes"	"눈을 감아"	New jack swing	
"Final Audition 2"	"파이널 오디션 2"	Big beat	Remix of "Final Audition".
"Free Style"	"프리 스타일"	Hip hop	Features Honey Family.
"Midnight Blue"	"미드나잇 블루"	Classical crossover (Hip hop)	Remix of "Pathétique", op.13, mov.2: adagio cantabile by Ludwig van Beethoven. The slowest Pump It Up Original song, at 80 BPM.
"Naissance"	"태동"	Breakbeat	
"Nightmare"	"악몽"	Freestyle	
"Pumping Up"	"펌핑 업"	Garage rock	
"She Likes Pizza"	"그녀는 피자를 좋아해"	Psychedelic rock	So far the fastest BanYa song, at 229.6 BPM. (Later rounded up to 230 BPM.)
"Turkey March"	"터키 행진곡"	Classical crossover (Progressive rock)	Remix of "Rondo alla Turca" by Wolfgang Amadeus Mozart.
"With My Lover"	"님과 함께" ("To Be With You")	Dance-pop	Cover version of "님과 함께" by Nam Jin.

=== Pump It Up The O.B.G: The Season Evolution Dance Floor ===
Title	Korean title	Genre	Notes
"Betrayer"	"사랑가"	Hip hop	Features Drunken Tiger. Based on a traditional Korean song.
"First Love"	"첫사랑"	Ragga	Based on "All That She Wants" by Ace of Base.
"Mr. Larpus"	"미스터 라푸스"	Punk rock	Based on "Wipe Out" by The Surfaris.
"Oh! Rosa"	"오! 로사"	Reggae en Español	
"Solitary"	"무혼" ("武魂")	Progressive rock	

=== Pump It Up: The Perfect Collection ===
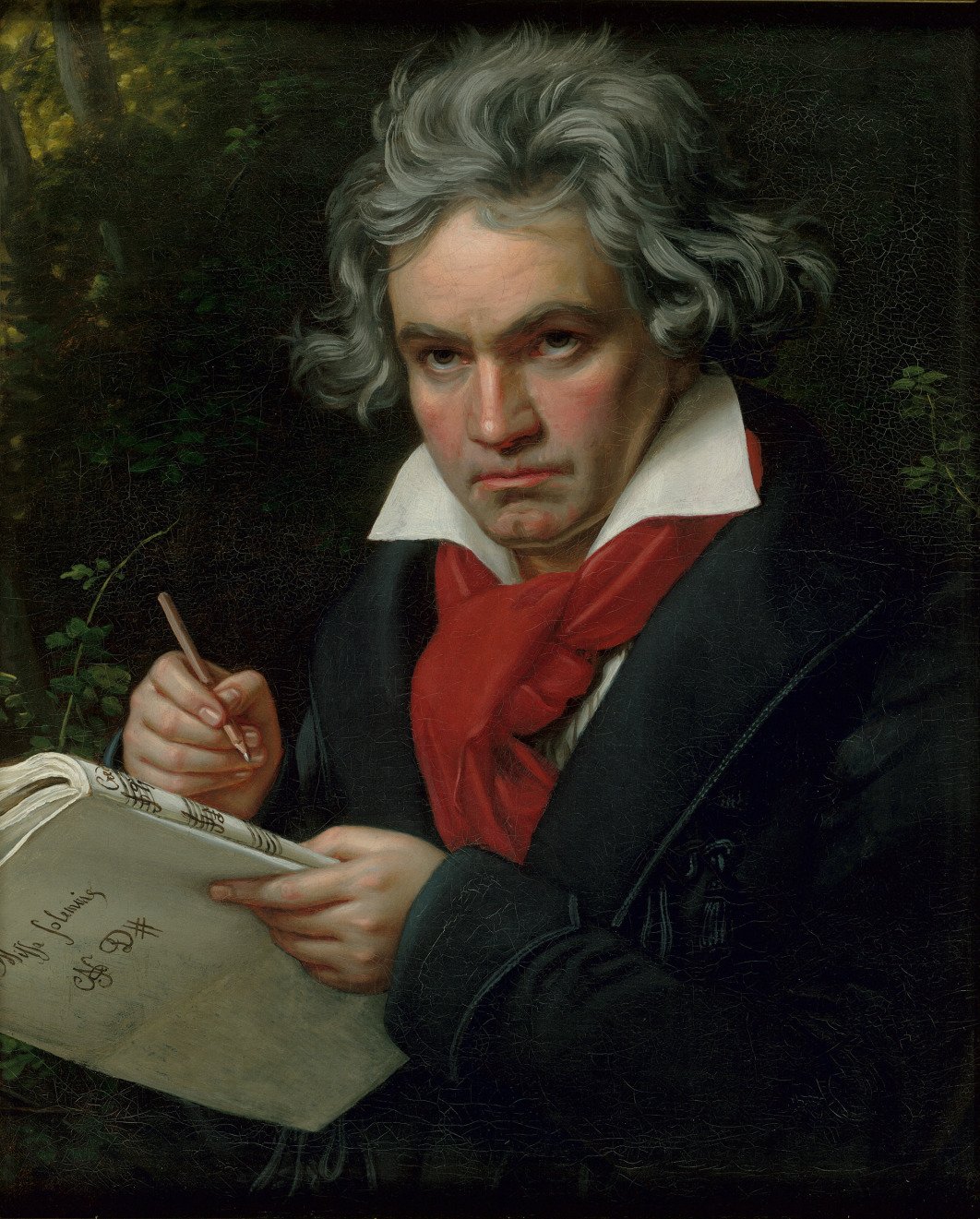
Beethoven, inspiration of Beethoven Virus.

Title	Korean title	Genre	Notes
"All I Want for X-Mas"	"올 아이 원트 포 크리스마스"	Dance-pop	
"Beethoven Virus"	"베토벤 바이러스"	Classical crossover (Oratorio)	Remix of "Pathétique", op.13, mov.3: rondo (allegro) by Ludwig van Beethoven.
"N"	"엔"	Hip hop	
"Pump Jump"	"펌프 점프"	Hip hop	
"Rolling Christmas"	"롤링 크리스마스"	Christmas rock	Inspired on various Christmas songs such as "Joy to the World" and "Jingle Bells".

=== Pump It Up: Extra ===
Title	Korean title	Genre	Notes
"Chicken Wing"	"치킨 윙"	Dance speed	
"Final Audition Episode 1"	"파이널 오디션 에피소드 1"	Techno	

=== Pump It Up: The Rebirth ===
Title	Korean title	Genre	Notes
"Csikos Post"	"우편마차"	Classical crossover (Breakbeat)	Remix of "Csikós Post" by Hermann Necke.
"Dance With Me"	"댄스 위드 미"	2-step garage	
"Dr. M"	"덕터 엠"	Classical crossover (Baroque)	Remix of "Symphony No. 40" by Wolfgang Amadeus Mozart.
"Emperor"	"엠페러"	Jazz	
"Get Your Groove On"	"겟 유어 그루브 온"	Rap rock	
"Love is a Danger Zone"	"러브 이즈 어 댄저 존"	Dance-pop	
"Maria"	"마리아"	Classical crossover (Choir)	Remix of "Ave Maria" by Franz Schubert.
"Miss's Story"	"미스 에스 스토리"	Classical crossover (Hip hop)	Remix of "Symphony No. 5" by Ludwig van Beethoven.
"Mission Possible"	"미션 파서블"	Progressive rock	Based on "Theme from Mission: Impossible" by Lalo Schifrin.
"My Way"	"마이 웨이"	Funk	
"Oy Oy Oy"	"오이 오이 오이"	Cha-cha-cha	Has a Spanish version, never included in any Pump It Up version.
"Point Break"	"포인트 브레이크"	Classical crossover (Soft rock)	Remix of "Orchestral Suite No. 3 in D major", second piece "Air on the G String" by Johann Sebastian Bach.
"Set Me Up"	"셋 미 업"	2-step garage	
"Street Show Down"	"스트리트 쇼 다운"	Big beat	
"Till The End Of Time"	"틸 디 엔드 오브 타임"	Dance-pop	
"Vook"	"부크"	Happy hardcore	
"We Will Meet Again"	"위 윌 밋 어게인"	Funk	
"Will o' the Wisp"	"윌 오 더 위스프"	Drum and bass	The original background video was replaced because it could cause seizures.
"Winter"	"윈터"	Classical crossover (Progressive)	Remix of the 1st movement (Allegro Non Molto) of "Winter" from "The Four Seasons" by Antonio Vivaldi.

=== Pump It Up: The Premiere 3 ===
Title	Korean title	Genre	Notes
"Beat of the War"	"비트 오브 더 워"	Hard rock	Based on "Holy Wars... The Punishment Due" by Megadeth.
"Bee"	"비"	Classical crossover (Progressive rock)	Remix of "Flight of the Bumblebee" by Nikolai Rimsky-Korsakov.
"D Gang"	"디 갱"	Synthpop	
"Hello"	"헬로우"	Salsa	

=== Pump It Up: The PREX 3 ===
Title	Korean title	Genre	Notes
"Come to Me"	"컴 투 미"	Jazz	

=== Pump It Up: Exceed ===
Title	Korean title	Genre	Notes
"Blazing"	"블레이징"	Latin jazz	
"Final Audition 3 U.F"	"파이널 오디션 3"	Breakbeat	
"Get Up!"	"겟 업!"	Classical crossover (New age)	Remix of "Symphony No. 9" by Ludwig van Beethoven.
"Monkey Fingers"	"몽키 핑거즈"	Indie rock	A secret song in this release. Based on a Korean children's song.
"Naissance 2"	"태동 2"	Big beat	Features samples of "Renegade Master" by Wildchild.
"Pump Me Amadeus"	"펌프 미 아마데우스"	Classical crossover (Oratorio)	Remix of "Symphony No. 25" by Wolfgang Amadeus Mozart.
"X-Treme"	"엑스트림"	Electronic rock	This features some of the same samples that "Gorgeous 2012" by Naoki Maeda under the pseudonym "The Surrenders" used. Later renamed as "X-Tream".
"First Love (Spanish version)"	"첫사랑 (스페인어)"	Ragga	A secret song in this release. Spink.! adapted the Spanish version of "First Love" released in The O.B.G. SE.
"Oh! Rosa (Spanish version)"	"오! 로사 (스페인어)"	Reggae en Español	A secret song in this release. Spink.! adapted the Spanish version of "Oh! Rosa" released in The O.B.G. SE.

=== Pump It Up: Exceed 2 ===
Title	Korean title	Genre	Notes
"Canon-D"	"캐논 디"	Classical crossover (Soft rock)	Remix of "Canon in D" by Johann Pachelbel.
"Hi-Bi"	"하이 바이"	Drum and bass	
"J Bong"	"제이 봉"	Drumfunk	
"Solitary 2"	"무혼 2" ("武魂 2")	Progressive rock	A secret song in this release.

=== Pump It Up: Zero ===
Title	Korean title	Genre	Notes
"Beat of the War 2"	"비트 오브 더 워 2"	Heavy metal	Based on "Holy Wars... The Punishment Due" by Megadeth.
"Jump"	"점프"	Sambass	
"Love is a Danger Zone 2"	"러브 이즈 어 댄저 존 pt.2"	Indie dance	Inspired on "Motorbreath" by Metallica.
"Moonlight"	"월광"	Classical crossover (Power pop)	Remix of "Moonlight Sonata" 3rd Movement: Presto agitato by Ludwig van Beethoven.
"Papa Gonzales"	"파파 곤잘레스"	Salsa	Based on "Modern Jazz Samba" by Kevin MacLeod.
"Phantom"	"팬텀"	Power pop	Based on the theme of The Phantom of the Opera.
"Witch Doctor"	"위치 닥터"	Drum and bass	A locked song in this release.

=== Pump It Up: NX ===
Title	Korean title	Genre	Notes
BanYa Production songs
"2006 Love Song"	"사랑가 2006"	Hip hop	Remake of "Betrayer" in The O.B.G. SE.
"Bullfighter's Song"	"투우사의 노래"	Classical crossover (Salsa)	Remix of "Toreador Song" in "Carmen" by Georges Bizet.
"Do You Know That -Old School-"	"두 유 노우 댓-올드 스쿨"	Hip hop	
"Gun Rock"	"건 락"	Heavy metal	Remake of Exceed 2's opening theme "Raw" (which, in turn, was based on "This Is the New Shit" by Marilyn Manson).
"Ugly Dee"	"미운 오리새끼"	Classical crossover (Breakbeat)	Remix of "Swan Lake" by Pyotr Ilyich Tchaikovsky.
Yahpp songs
"Arch of Darkness"	"아크 오프 다크네스"	New age	Known for featuring Andamiro's survival shooting game Arch Shade, as its background animation.
"Chimera"	"키메라"	Classical crossover (Progressive rock)	Remix of "Queen of the Night" in "The Magic Flute" by Wolfgang Amadeus Mozart.
"Final Audition Episode 2-1"	"파이널 오디션 에피소드 2-1"	Electronic rock	Inspired on "Far Beyond the Sun" by Yngwie Malmsteen.
"Final Audition Episode 2-2"	"파이널 오디션 에피소드 2-2"	Progressive rock	Faster version of "Final Audition Episode 2-1".
"Fire"	"불놀이야"	Breakbeat	Cover version of "불놀이야" by Oxen 80. Also called "Fire Game". Only available in World Tour in NX, in World Max and Special Zone in NX2.
"Witch Doctor #1"	"위치 닥터 #1"	Breakbeat	Remix and slower version of "Witch Doctor" in Zero.

=== Pump It Up: NX2 ===
Title	Korean title	Genre	Notes
BanYa Production songs
"Beat the Ghost"	"비트 더 고스트"	Breakbeat	
"Caprice of Otada"	"카프리스 오브 오타다"	Classical crossover (Electronic rock)	Remix of "Rhapsody on a Theme of Paganini (Caprice #24)" by Sergei Rachmaninoff.
"Guitar Man"	"기타 맨"	Hard rock	Inspired by the track "Gravekeeper's Anger" featured in Deathsmiles.
"Higgledy Piggledy"	"히글디 피글디"	Classical crossover (Nuevo tango)	A mix of classical crossover remixes: "Habanera" by Georges Bizet and "Por una Cabeza" by Carlos Gardel.
"Jam O Beat"	"잼 오 비트"	Big beat	Features samples of "Vogue" by Madonna.
"Money"	"머니"	Funk	
"Monkey Fingers 2"	"몽키 핑거즈 2"	Indietronica	New version of "Monkey Fingers".
Yahpp songs
"Faster Z"	"패스터 Z"	Classical crossover (Orchestra rock)	Remix of "Zigeunerweisen" by Pablo de Sarasate.
"Pumptris Quattro"	"펌트리스 꽈뜨로"	Breakbeat	Tetris-themed Pump It Up song. The "Quattro" is because the song has four different parts based on Tetris-themed songs (two of those songs are Ivan Petrovich Larionov's "Kalinka", and Dimitri Dourakine's "Casatchok"). Also an inside-joke reference to Argentinian players.
"Pumptris 8bit ver."	"펌트리스 8비트 ver."	Chiptune	The 8-bit version of "Pumptris Quattro", similar to original Tetris music themes.
"Solitary 1.5"	"무혼 1.5"	Progressive rock	Remix of the second unused part of the full version of "Solitary". Unlocked when using USB.

=== Pump It Up: NX Absolute ===
Title	Korean title	Genre	Notes
BanYa Production songs
"DJ Otada"	"디제이 오타다"	Classical crossover (Happy hardcore)	Remix of "Trumpet Concerto" 3rd Movement by Joseph Haydn.
"K.O.A -Alice in Wonderworld-"	"케이.오.에이 : 엘리스 인 원더월드"	Classical crossover (Chiptune)	Remix of "Six moments musicaux op.94-3" by Franz Schubert.
"My Dreams"	"마이 드림즈"	Rap metal	Slow part based on "Feel Good Inc." by Gorillaz.
"The People Didn't Know"	"사람들은 몰랐다네"	Dance-pop	
"Toccata"	"토카타"	Classical crossover (Cathedral)	Remix of "Toccata and Fugue in D minor" by Johann Sebastian Bach.
Yahpp songs
"Blaze Emotion"	"블레이즈 이모션"	Power pop	
"Cannon X.1"	"캐논 X.1"	Classical crossover (Hard rock)	Remixed, faster version of "Canon-D" from Exceed 2. Unlockable when using USB.
"Chopsticks Challenge"	"젓가락 변주곡"	Electro house	
"Final Audition Episode 2-X"	"파이널 오디션 에피소드 2-X"	Progressive rock	Has similar BPM of "Final Audition Episode 2-1" from NX, but has more difficult stepchart. Available since 2009 in NXA machines.

=== Pump It Up: Fiesta ===
Title	Korean title	Genre	Notes
BanYa Production songs
"Arirang"	"아리랑"	Korean folk	Remix of "Arirang", a popular Korean folk song.
"Do It -Reggae Style-"	"두 잇 레게 스타일"	Reggae	
"Get Up (And Go)"	"겟 업 (앤 고)"	Classical crossover (New age)	New version of "Get Up!".
"Hello William"	"안녕 윌리엄"	Classical crossover (Overture)	Remix of "William Tell Overture" Finale by Gioachino Rossini.
"Mission Possible -Blow Back-"	"미션 파서블 -블로우 백-"	Progressive rock	New version of "Mission Possible".
"Phantom -Intermezzo-"	"팬텀 -인터메조-"	Power pop	New version of "Phantom".
"Pumping Jumping"	"펌핑 점핑"	Hip hop	New version of "Pump Jump".
"Tek -Club Copenhagen-"	"테크 -클럽 코펜하겐-"	Electro house	
"Turkey March -Minimal Tunes-"	"터키 행진곡 -미니멀튠즈-"	Classical crossover (Chiptune)	Slower, stripped-down version of "Turkey March".
"Xenesis"	"제네시스"	Classical crossover (New age)	Remix of "From the New World" 4th Movement by Antonín Dvořák.
msgoon song
"Betrayer -Act 2-"	"사랑가 -2막-"	Hip hop	New version of "Betrayer", credited to msgoon, the former BanYa member.
Yahpp songs
"Sorceress Elise"	"소서리스 엘리제"	Classical crossover (Big beat)	Remix of "Für Elise" by Ludwig van Beethoven.
"X-Tree"	"엑스트리"	Christmas rock	Inspired on various Christmas songs such as "Santa Claus Is Comin' to Town" and "Jingle Bell Rock".

=== Pump It Up: Fiesta EX ===
Title	Korean title	Genre	Notes
BanYa Production songs
"Hungarian Dance V"	"헝가리 무곡 V"	Classical crossover (New age)	Remix of "Hungarian Dances No.5" by Johannes Brahms.
"The Devil"	"마왕"	Classical crossover (Progressive rock)	Remix of "In the Hall of the Mountain King" by Edvard Grieg.

=== Pump It Up: Prime ===
Title	Korean title	Genre	Notes
Yahpp songs
"Red Swan"	"레드 스완"	Classical crossover (Progressive breakbeat)	Remix of NX's "Ugly Dee" by BanYa Production
"Blaze Emotion (Band Version)"	"블레이즈 이모션 (Band Version)"	Piano rock	Non-vocal version of NXA's "Blaze Emotion". Final song by Yahpp in Pump It Up series.

=== Pump It Up: Infinity ===
Title	Korean title	Genre	Notes
"Extravaganza Reborn"		Techno hardcore	Remix of The 2nd Dance Floor's "Extravaganza", remixed by Wavelength.
"Hypnosis (SynthWulf Mix)"	"힙노시스 (SynthWulf 믹스)"	Synthpop/dubstep	Remix of The 1st Dance Floor's "Hypnosis", remixed by SynthWulf.
"Ignis Fatuus (DM Ashura Mix)"	"이그니스 패터스 (DM Ashura 믹스)"	Progressive rock	Remix of The Rebirth's "Will o' the Wisp", remixed by DM Ashura.
"Love is a Danger Zone (Cranky Mix)"	"러브 이즈 어 데인저 존 (Cranky 믹스)"	Dance-pop	Remix of The Rebirth's "Love is a Danger Zone", remixed by Cranky.
"Solitary (Sanxion7 Mix)"		Progressive	Remix of The O.B.G. SE's "Solitary", remixed by Sanxion7.

=== StepManiaX ===
Title	Genre	Notes
"Beethoven Virus (2021 Yahpp Remix)"	Classical crossover	Remix of "Beethoven Virus", remixed by Yahpp.
"Csikos Post (2021 Yahpp Remix)"	Classical crossover	Remix of "Csikos Post", remixed by Yahpp.
"Dr. M (2021 Yahpp Remix)"	Classical crossover	Remix of "Dr. M", remixed by Yahpp.
"Step Up Amadeus (2021 Yahpp Remix)"	Classical crossover	Remix of "Pump Me Amadeus", remixed by Yahpp.
"Winter (2021 Yahpp Remix)"	Classical crossover	Remix of "Winter", remixed by Yahpp.

=== Additional songs ===
BanYa also released some songs on promotional CDs, which are not featured so far in any games:

- "Warm Shadow in a Stranger's Eyes"
- "Going Home"
- "Golden Tears"
- "Let Me Break it Down"

As well as Full versions of the following in-game songs:

- "Beat of the War 2" (Full version is playable on NX, NX2, NXA and Fiesta)
- "Canon-D" (its Full version is a secret remix on Exceed 2, but has yet appear on any soundtracks. It also appears in Zero's Remix Station, in NX/NX2/NXA's Special Zone, and Fiesta under Full Songs)
- "Dance With Me"
- "Emperor"
- "Final Audition"
- "Fire" (Full version is playable on NX and NX2)
- "Get Your Groove On"
- "Hate"
- "Love is a Danger Zone 2" (Full version is playable on NX, NX2, NXA and Fiesta)
- "Maria"
- "Miss's Story"
- "Mission Possible"
- "Mr. Larpus"
- "My Way"
- "N"
- "Oh! Rosa"
- "Oy Oy Oy"
- "Point Break"
- "Pump Jump"
- "She Likes Pizza"
- "Solitary"
- "Winter"

== Discography ==
=== The 1st Step to the BanYa ===
This album comprised all their songs from Pump It Up: The 1st Dance Floor to The O.B.G: The Season Evolution Dance Floor, excluding Creamy Skinny and Koul, from The 2nd Dance Floor. It also included an electric guitar version of Ignition Starts instead of the original hardcore version, a version of Hate sung by Pp (the same girl who sang Pumping Up) and a completely new song, a ballad entitled "Warm Shadow in a Stranger's Eyes" (rough translation, as it's very hard to translate this title from Korean). All the songs that existed in a version longer than the one appearing in the arcade were included in their original versions, except Final Audition.

1. Nightmare
2. Midnight Blue
3. She Likes Pizza (Pump mix)
4. Close Your Eyes
5. Free Style
6. Turkey March
7. Pumping Up
8. First Love
9. An Interesting View
10. Oh! Rosa (Pump mix)
11. With My Lover
12. Betrayer (Pump mix)
13. Final Audition (Pump mix)
14. Naissance
15. Ignition Starts (guitar version)
16. Final Audition 2
17. Hypnosis
18. Mr Larpus (Pump mix)
19. Extravaganza
20. Solitary (Pump mix)
21. Betrayer (Original version)
22. Hate
23. Hate (Pp version)
24. Oh! Rosa (Original version)
25. She Likes Pizza (Original version)
26. Solitary (Original version)
27. Mr Larpus (Original version)
28. Warm Shadow in a Stranger's Eyes

=== Interlock ===
1. Pump Jump
2. Mission Possible
3. My Way
4. The Emperor
5. Golden Tears
6. Get Your Groove On
7. Going Home
8. All I Want for X-Mas
9. Let Me Break It Down
10. Love Is A Danger Zone
11. Street Show Down
12. Will-O'-The-Wisp
13. Beethoven Virus
14. Maria
15. Dr. M
16. Point Break
17. Winter
18. Chicken Wing (Mutation)

=== Unfinished ===
1. Final Audition 3 U.F
2. Beat of the War
3. Naissance 2
4. Csikos Post
5. Rolling Christmas
6. Hello
7. D Gang
8. Bee
9. Vook
10. Pump Me Amadeus
11. Get Up!!
12. Blazing
13. Set me Up
14. Come to Me
15. Miss's Story
16. Oy Oy Oy
17. N
18. Till the end of Time
19. Dance With Me
20. Monkey Fingers
21. We Will Meet Again
