= StepManiaX =

2017 video game

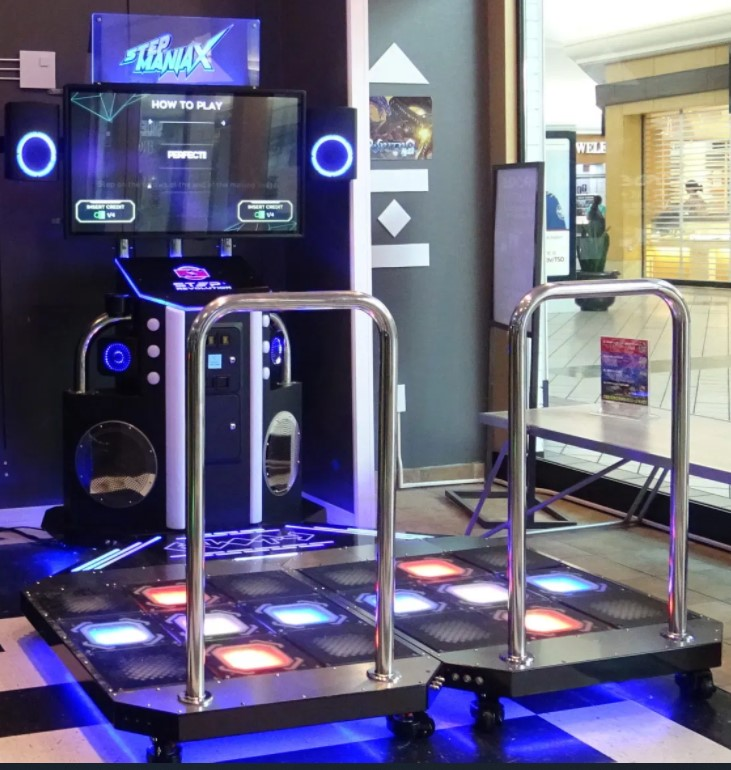
- A StepManiaX Dedicated cabinet
- Developer: Step Revolution
- Engine: StepMania
- Platform: Arcade
- Release: June 10, 2017
- Genres: Music, Exergaming
- Modes: Single-player, multiplayer

StepManiaX (abbreviated SMX and pronounced "Step Maniacs") is a rhythm game developed and published by Step Revolution, a studio formed by former developers of In the Groove, ReRave, and Pump It Up Pro. It is considered a spiritual successor to the In the Groove series. The name is a nod to the legacy of the open-source simulator StepMania, as many of the original StepMania developers are involved with the project. StepManiaX is derived from the same codebase, with modifications made to support the new game types, lights, touch support, connectivity, and the custom Android operating system and hardware that dedicated units run on.

== Gameplay ==
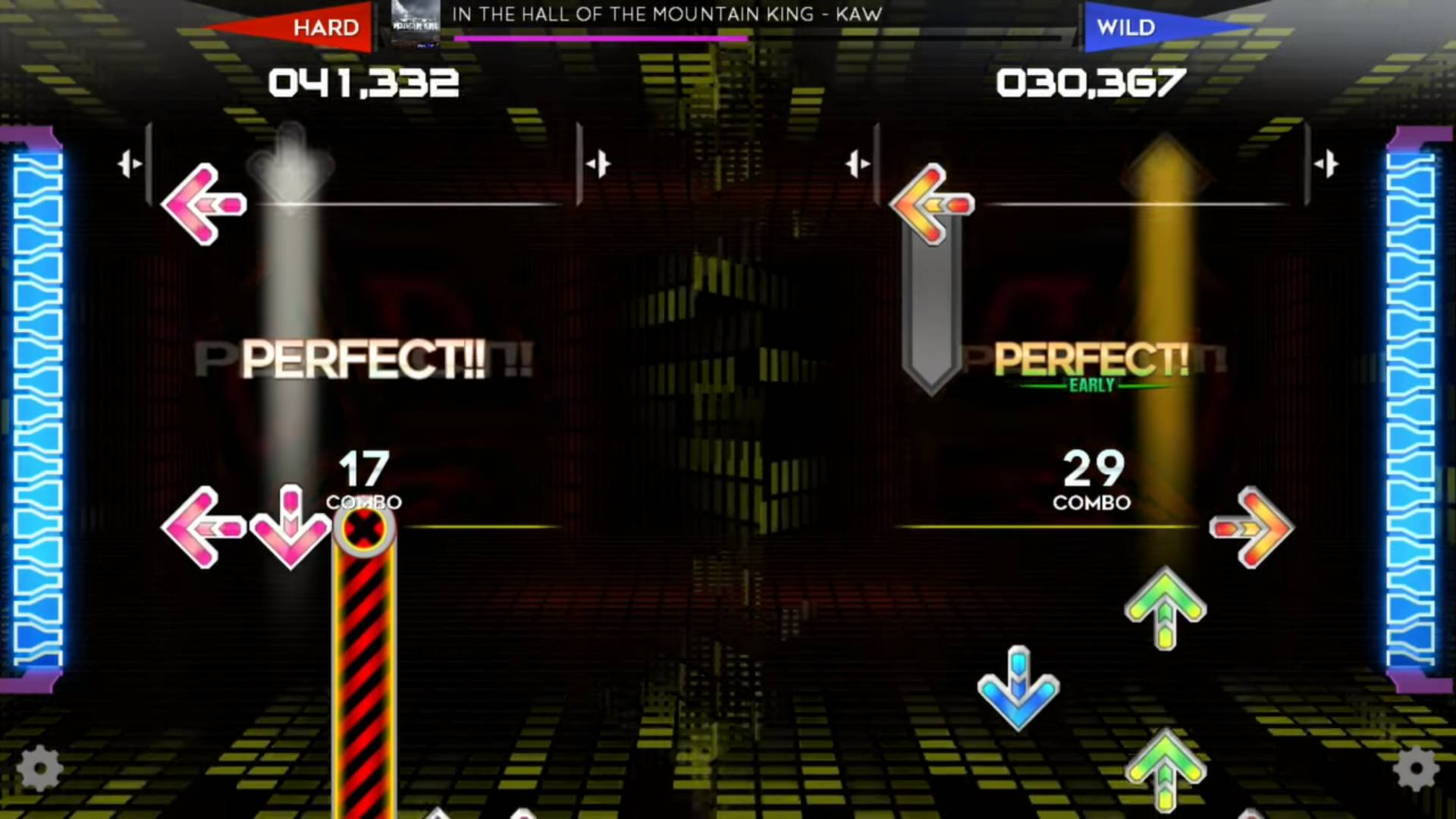
StepManiaX gameplay, showing holds, pits, early perfects, and so forth

Similar to other stepping or dance-based games, StepManiaX uses a "stage" that the user stands on with certain areas being pressure-sensitive buttons, or "panels". StepManiaX uses five identically sized inputs, arranged similarly to a Directional Pad - Up, Down, Left, Right, and the inclusion of Center.

Players can select between seven different difficulty levels that affect how many inputs are active and the difficulty of patterns displayed. Players can also customize modifiers adjust to their preferred style, such as changing the visual appearance of patterns, how fast patterns appear, background brightness, etc.

The core gameplay involves players stepping on the panel with their feet to correspond with the scrolling arrows (or "Notes") on-screen once they reach the end of beat lines (horizontal bars that move up the screen). During normal gameplay, arrows scroll upwards from the bottom of the screen towards the end of the play area, towards a set of receptor markers on the sides of the arrow lanes. When these scrolling arrows reach the end, the player must step on the corresponding arrows on the dance stage, and the player is given a judgement for their accuracy of the input. Each note judged has multiple "windows" that it can be categorized into. These, from most accurate to least, are: PERFECT!!, PERFECT, EARLY, LATE, and MISS. Any judgement that is not "PERFECT!!" will show an indicator if the input was registered early or late compared to the intended timing.

Stepping accurately will contribute to the player's life bar, visible on the edge of the screen. Missing notes will cause a player's lifebar to decrease. If a player's lifebar empties entirely, scoring will halt and the song will no longer be able to be "passed" for that player, although the game will still continue until a player manually ends the song or the song completes.

Additional note types are also included with StepManiaX's gameplay.

- Holds - Notes that have longer, extended trails following the initial directional indicator. Players must keep the corresponding direction depressed for the duration of the trail. Similar to Pump It Up, holds continuously generate combo for the player while being held down and also have the ability to be re-stepped on if the player was to accidentally release the hold before being completed. If the player releases the hold at any time, the player will instead receive a yellow "!" judgement, regardless if it is being held at the end. Successfully completing a hold will generate a green checkmark judgement. Continuously failing to hold the indicated direction will decrease the player's health bar significantly, and will continue to deplete until the direction is pressed
- Rolls - Similar in appearance to a hold, but typically displayed visibly as spiky. Rolls display a number of times a panel must be hit before it ends - this is indicated by a number attached to the top of the roll. For example, if the number shows 3, the player must hit that same panel 3 times before that Roll ends.
- Mines - Displayed as a circular shape with a red 'X' through it, these notes must be avoided. The button that the column corresponds to must not be touched (hit or held) at any point until the mine passes. Avoiding the mines generate a checkmark, while failing to avoid generate a "X" that punishes the player. Avoiding mines will award the player a small point value.
- Pits - Combining both Holds and Mines, pits are "long mines" that will punish a player if they hold down the indicated direction while the pit is scrolling past the end of the playfield. Continuously holding down a direction while a pit is active will punish a player by severely decreasing their health bar the longer it is held. Completely avoiding a pit will award the player a small point value.
- Lifts - Always placed at the end of a hold. Appropriately named, the player is expected to lift off the panel at the precise time the lift reaches the end of the playfield. Successfully lifting will reward a green checkmark judgement and a small point bonus, while failing to do so will reward a yellow "!" and no points.

Completing a song while a player still has energy remaining in their health bar will award a "pass" to the player. The player is taken to the Results Screen, which rates the player's performance with a star rating (between one and six stars, with a specialized design for players who achieve the maximum score of 100,000 points), the points earned (between 0 and 100,000, which can be interpreted as a percentage by dividing by 1000), and specific judgement statistics.

=== Difficulties and Modes ===
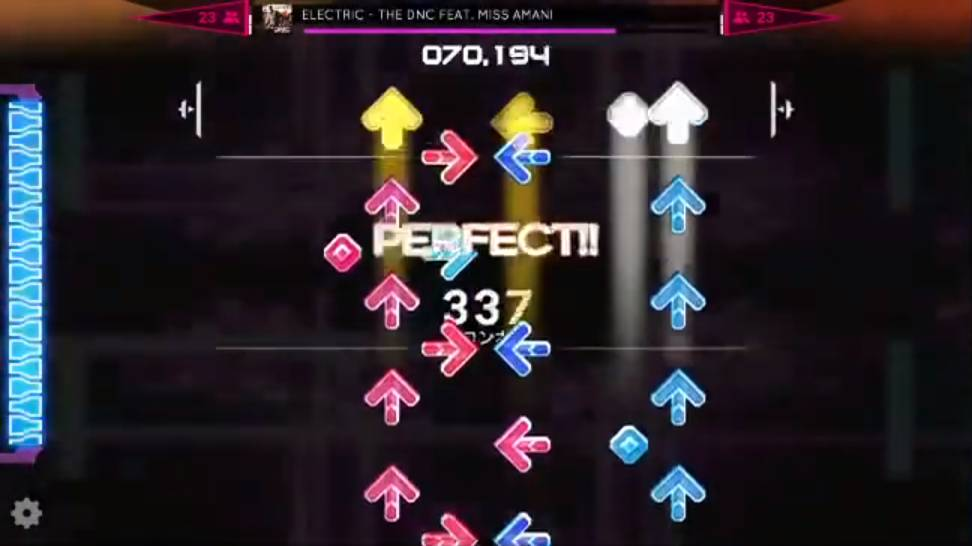
Two players playing Team Mode

There are eleven different difficulty tiers within gameplay:

Difficulty Tier List
Mode	Format	Panels	Difficulty Range
Beginner	Single	3	1 to 6
Easy	Single	5	4 to 13
Easy+	Single	5	6 to 13
Hard	Single	5	12 to 20
Hard+	Single	5	15 to 20
Wild	Single	5	19 to 27
Dual	Double	6	2 to 23
Dual+	Double	6	16 to 24
Full	Double	10	7 to 28
Full+	Double	10	16 to 27
Team	Double (Note: Single (left-hand player) and Single (right-hand player) playing together.)	10	9 to 26
Edit	Any (user created)	Any (user created)	Any (user created)

Difficulty names help pool difficulty numbers within easier named ranges. While it's intended to give new players a quick way to recognize where they land skill-wise, the numbered difficulty allows players to more granularity advance. Difficulty numbers are not locked to existing within a certain named pool.

The first four of these (Beginner, Easy, Hard, and Wild) are intended to be played by a single player on a single stage. For single-stage format, beginner mode exists to get newcomers to play and cater to freestylers, while using just three panels: left, center, and right. Easy adds the up and down panels, making all five panels available to play. Hard makes the different colored rhythm panels more common and may add a few advanced features like pits. Wild further increasing the difficulty while making additional features more common.

The next two difficulties, Dual and Full, are intended to be played by a single player utilizing both stages. Dual Mode is a new mode introduced to dance games that uses six horizontal panels, with both ups and downs not present. Full Mode uses all ten panels. These difficulties are not available if two players (non-cooperative play) are playing.

The last difficulty, Team, is intended to be played by two players simultaneously using both stages. In this mode, both players share the same lifebar and same score and are instructed to follow their unique color of notes to work cooperatively to clear the song. If one of the two players confirms the choice of Team, the other player can only choose Team. If one of the two players confirms the choice of any difficulty other than Team, the choice of Team on the other player will not be available.

Announced at IAAPA 2022, + (plus) charts (Easy+, Hard+, Dual+, and Full+), aside from their corresponding non-plus charts, will be added to songs. This is intended to fill the void on difficulty gaps. Newer content, by default, includes these difficulties. Existing content is slowly updated over time to add in the additional slots via online updates.

On May 22, 2023, the StepManiaX mobile app began allowing users to create their own Edit charts for songs and share them with other users. These edits are able to use any of the existing formats (Single, Double, or Team).

== Development ==
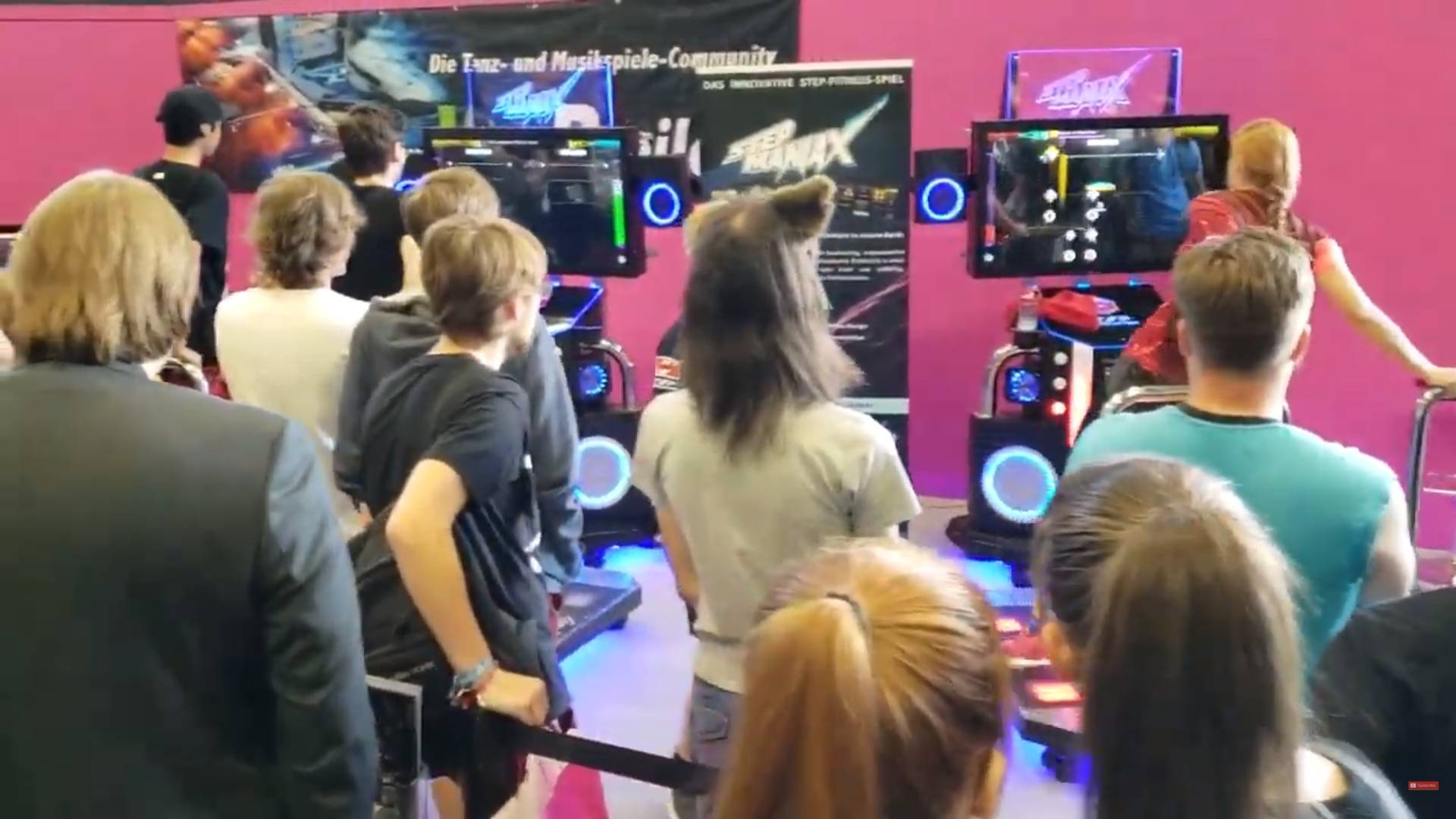
Step Revolution showcasing two StepManiaX machines at Gamescom 2019

Development of StepManiaX started with stage development in early 2015. Several different designs were prototyped using various sensor technologies, including load-cells, piezoelectric sensors, force-sensing resistors, and optical sensors housed in an aluminum slim-line stage. This design was officially shown to the public by project lead Kyle Ward in early 2016. Later that year, the retail version of the stage was shown, sporting a thicker, more durable steel stage design. During this period, the StepManiaX software was being developed in tandem with hardware development. The goal of the software was to create a simple interface that was accessible for all ranges of players. The game then grew its design to appeal to a wide variety of locations: Home, Health & Fitness, Education, Competitive E-Sports, and Family Recreation. The title StepManiaX was selected to focus on the aerobic stepping aspect of the game, rather than face the common criticism of "dance" games not featuring "dance" movement.

The game's first public showing was during MAGFest 2017.

StepManiaX was released in June 2017, but access to the game was very limited. Initially targeting fitness and recreational facilities, the game was installed at various family-oriented locations. During this time, the all-in-one cabinet design was exhibited at various trade fairs and gaming events like Gamescom 2017 as sales were limited due to stock shortages and gauging interest with distribution partners. Multiple waves of sales for consumer use eventually led to home users acquiring hardware, as sales were not limited to organizations or certain environments. The following year, a coin-operated version of the game premiered at 8 on the Break as an initial location and hardware test. This cabinet revision also premiered commercially at IAAPA 2019. Since then, the game is available directly via the developer's web store and through various distribution partners.

During the COVID-19 pandemic, an integrated touch monitor/game combination was introduced for home users wanting to experience the game at home during lockdown. This led to the future creation of the home-purpose cabinet types.

Step Revolution unveiled a new, larger, cabinet model IAAPA 2022 known as the "Deluxe" model. It features a 65" touchscreen display, dynamic lighting show, and an improved sound system over the Dedicated model.

At IAAPA 2024, Step Revolution announced the availability of a new "Standard" model. This model replaces the existing Dedicated cabinet and features a 55" touchscreen and enhanced lighting and aesthetics that bring it closer to the existing Deluxe model.

== Hardware ==
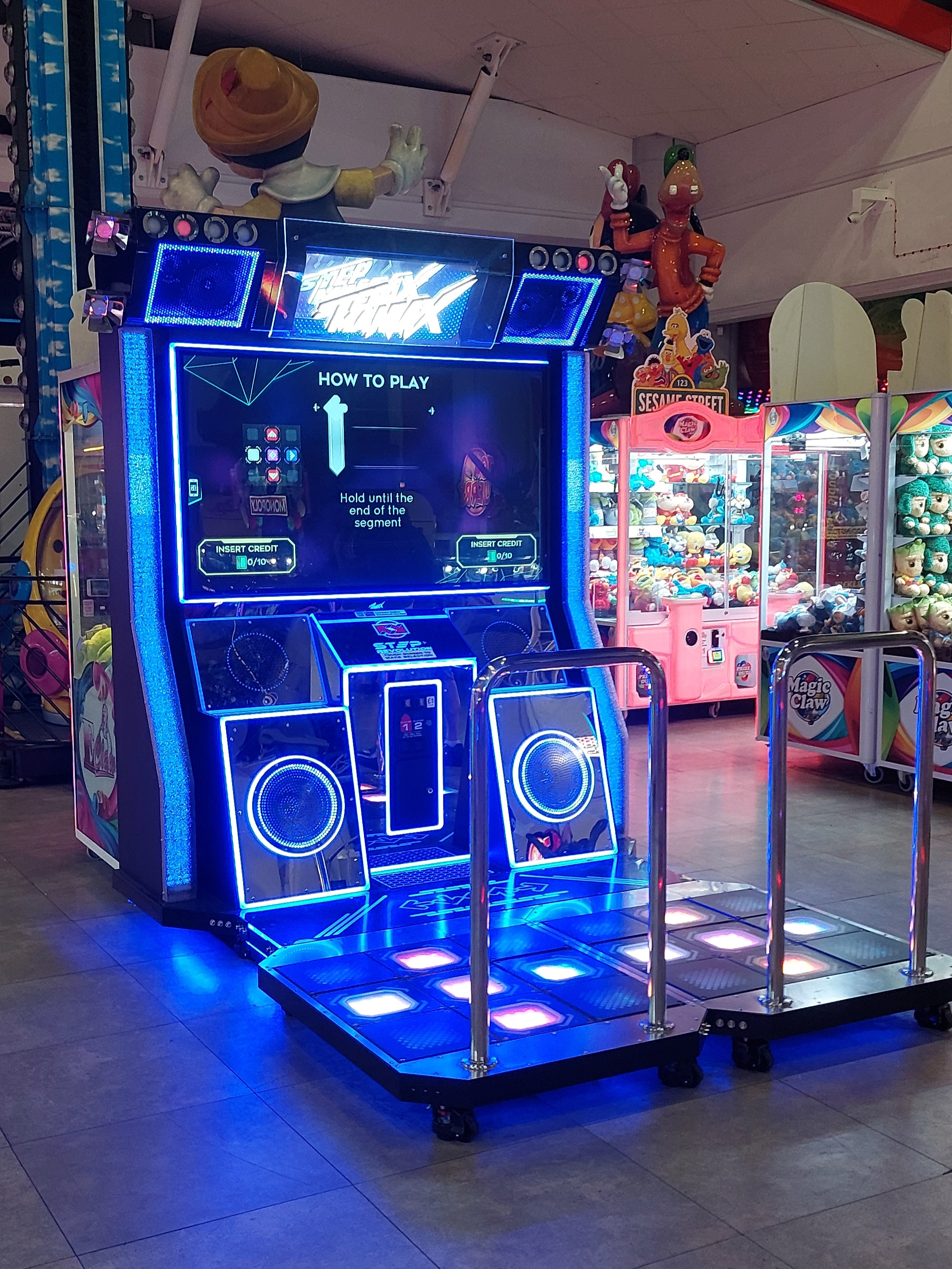
Deluxe cabinet

=== Cabinets ===
There are currently three StepManiaX cabinet models commercially available:

- Compact (formerly All-In-One) cabinet models are designed for free play. They feature a 43" touch screen monitor and a 2.1 sound system. All-In-One cabinet models are the sole models featuring headphone ports, with one for each player along with individual volume control.
- Dedicated cabinet models are designed for free or paid play, as they accept token coins or equivalent. The monitor is identical to the one used in Compact cabinet models, but Dedicated cabinet models feature a 4.2 sound system and a larger cabinet console. This model was replaced with the Standard cabinet as of 2024.
- Standard cabinets (sometimes referred to as Dedicated v2) were introduced at IAAPA Expo 2024. These models are based on the same design as the Dedicated cabinets but feature a 55" touch screen as well as enhanced LED lighting. This model fully replaces the existing Dedicated cabinet in regards to availability of new machines.
- Deluxe cabinet models were announced at IAAPA Expo 2022. They feature a 65" touch screen monitor and an 6.2 sound system. Like the Dedicated cabinet models, they support free or paid play.

While StepManiaX is intended to act as a complete product that includes both the game and the hardware needed to play it, individual parts can be bought and used on their own with other products.

=== Stages ===
The StepManiaX stage features five pressable panels by default: Up, down, left, right, and center. Each individual stage can be mechanically attached to a second to play game modes that require two stages, such as "Doubles" mode featured in many different dance games. Stages also contain a safety bar on the back, matching existing arcade hardware designs, but is slightly taller and thicker than other implementations. The bar is installed with two large bolts on the bottom of the stage.

Stages are capable of sensing pressure by using 4 sensors per each panel that has input, have an LED array underneath for visuals, illuminated underglow, and directly attach to StepManiaX arcade machines.

==== Initial Generation SMX Stages ====
The first released StepManiaX Stages, launched in 2017, used load-cell hardware to determine pressure in each panel and featured an array of 16 LEDs per panel. The stages also shipped with metal panels on the corners where input was not active that featured holes for letting light shine through for enhanced visuals ("lovingly" referred to as the "cheese-grater" panels by the community).

==== Second Generation SMX Stages ====
The second generation of StepManiaX Stages, introduced in 2019, changed the load-cells out for Force-sensing resistors which were more durable and built for a more commercial environment. The material for the active input panels was also replaced with a sturdier, thicker acrylic hybrid that did not feature dedicated arrow graphics printed on them. Instead, the internal LED array was upgraded to support 25 LEDs per panel, allowing the developers to create newer and more complex patterns and have artwork live through the lights, rather than unique printed panels. This generation also replaced the corner metal panels with thicker acrylic panels that matched the styling of the rest of the installed panels and more vividly allowed light to pass through.

==== Other uses ====
Due to the stages connecting via USB, they are also fully compatible with various simulators such as StepMania, Project OutFox, MAME, or any application capable of using HID Joystick input. Due to its breakout wiring, StepManiaX stages can be modified to completely bypass the USB output and natively work with other I/O solutions. This allows stages to be used with older home consoles, or even as replacements for stages on official Pump It Up cabinets.

An additional kit can be purchased to make the diagonal directions pressable, and there is also a kit that can convert it to play 5-panel games that traditionally have rectangular panels, like Pump It Up.

An Open Source SDK is available for those looking to integrate direct control over the stage hardware, including interfacing with the LEDs and reading individual pressure values, allowing integration into third-party software when not used with the commercial StepManiaX Game.

== Music ==
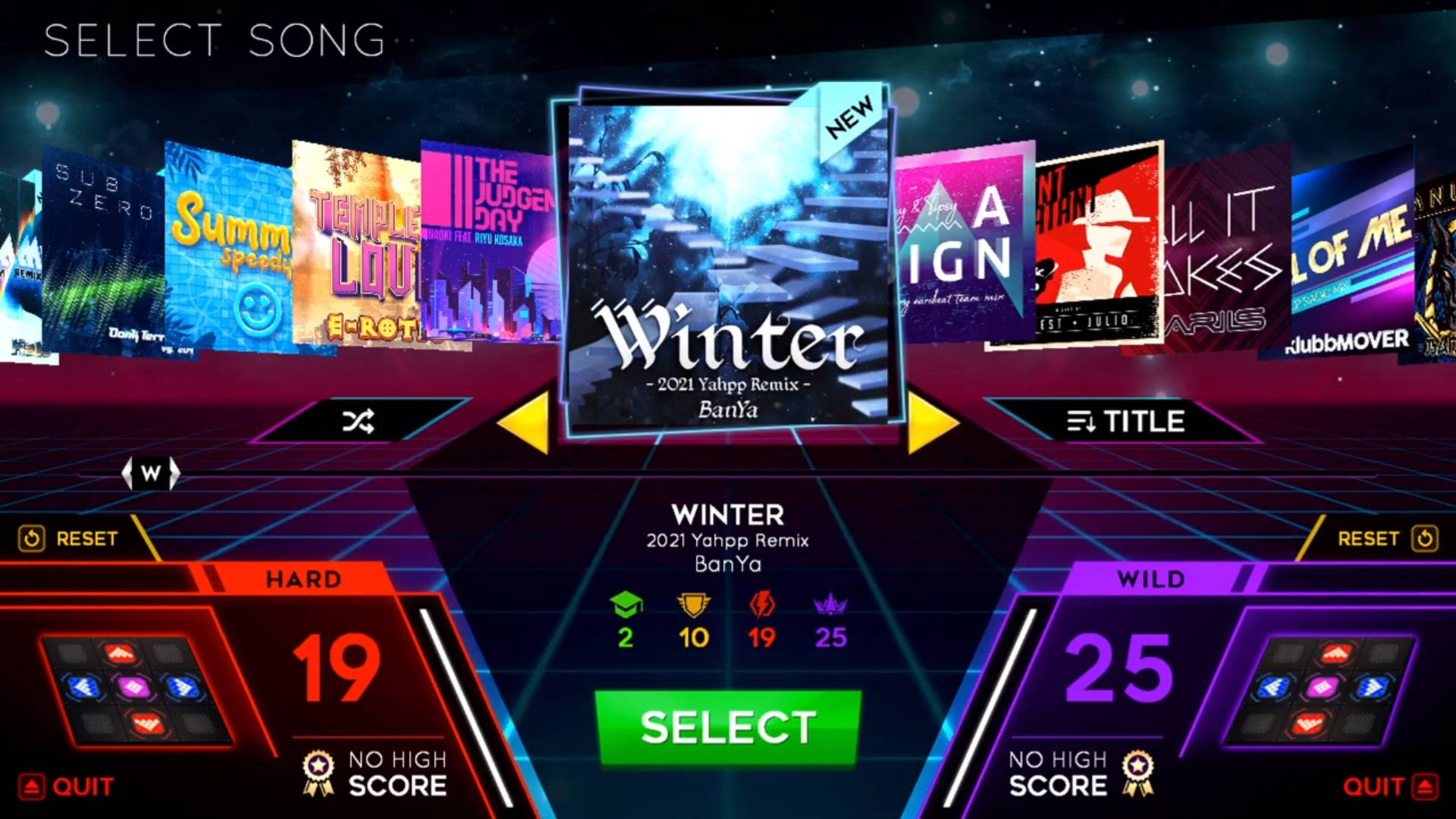
Music selection screen

The soundtrack style for StepManiaX is similar in approach to other dance games such as Dance Dance Revolution, Pump It Up, and In The Groove. The soundtrack generally consists of higher tempo music with easy to follow beats and well-defined rhythms. The song selection consists of newer songs that have never appeared in other music games, as well as older licenses that have also appeared in other music games. Alongside these older licenses are newer songs made by the same artists who worked on other music games, such as: Naoki Maeda, the original sound director for Dance Dance Revolution; Yahpp, one of the original members of Pump It Up's in-house production group BanYa; and Kyle Ward, the original sound director of In The Groove.

Premium songs are only available with a purchase from the arcade operator. Starting on March 5, 2018, StepManiaX started receiving free content updates, with the update schedule moving to a monthly cadence in April 2020.

As of November 19, 2026, StepManiaX features a total of 566 (Note: 565 visible and 1 hidden.) songs, which consists of 82 songs (28 of them being premium, remaining 54 being standard) upon launch and 484 (Note: 483 visible and 1 hidden.) songs obtained via online updates (480 (Note: 479 visible and 1 hidden.) songs previously obtained and 4 songs recently obtained.). This does not include the 4 songs which were removed on August 17, 2021, prior to the release of update #19.

386 (Note: 385 visible and 1 hidden.) current songs appear only in StepManiaX, which consists of 48 songs (24 premium and 24 standard) upon launch and 338 (Note: 337 visible and 1 hidden.) songs obtained via online update (334 (Note: 333 visible and 1 hidden.) song previously obtained and 4 song recently obtained.). From the removed songs, 3 of them appeared only in StepManiaX.

Four pairs of songs in StepManiaX have identical titles. They are "Dreaming", "Get Busy", "On My Own", and "Sky High".

The song artists with the most number of songs in StepManiaX are E-Rotic and Smiley, with 10 songs for each of them.

StepManiaX Songlist
Song Title	Song Artist	Update Version	Notes
All Of Me ~Handz Up Radio Mix~	Klubbmover	Launch	🔑
Ba Be Loo Be La	Kristeen	Launch	⭐
Bagpipe	A-Moe	Launch	
Be My Hero	Freezer	Launch	
Birdie	Doolittle	Launch	♥️
Blow My Mind	Alphadelta	Launch	⭐
Bounce ~Melbournce Bounce Project Remix~	Crew 7	Launch	🔑
Burning Tonight	Krystal	Launch	🔑 ♣️
Can't Get Enough	Miradey	Launch	🔑
Can't Let Go	Jenna Drey	Launch	
Change The World	Nathalie & Jim Lukas	Launch	
Cowbell Rock	Pyramyth	Launch	♣️
Crazy Baby ~2008 Club Edit~	Fantasy Project	Launch	♣️
Dabbi Doo	Ni-Ni	Launch	⭐
Dance Vibrations	Elpis	Launch	⭐
Dancing Circus	Brisby & Jingles	Launch	🔑
Day After Day ~De-Grees Rmx Edit~	Rikah	Launch	🔑
Don't Stop My Music Tonight	David Dima	Launch	🔑
Dream A Dream ~Cheeky Trax UK Remix~	Captain Jack	Launch	†
Dreaming	Rameses B feat. Holly Drummond	Launch	♣️
Dynamo	Oscillator X	Launch	♣️
Emotion	Smiley	Launch	
Endless Day	Verona	Launch	🔑
Everything is Changing ~Verano Remix Edit~	Rikah	Launch	🔑
Firewalker	Xenon	Launch	🔑
Flight of the Bumblebee	MonstDeath	Launch	
Frozen Fire	Kbit	Launch	
Funny Love (Filatov & Karas Remix)	Dan Balan	Launch	
Get Down	Kairo Kingdom	Launch	♣️
Girlz Night Out ~Andy Harding Club Mix~	Jenna Drey	Launch	
Got The Rhythm	Fracus & Darwin feat. Becca Hossany	Launch	♣️
Hard Fast Disco	Darwin	Launch	♣️ (Note: Hard Fast Disco samples "Get the Party Started" by Pink (singer).)
Hyper Hyper	Smiley	Launch	
I Love You Baby	Pandera	Launch	⭐
In the Hall of the Mountain King	KaW	Launch	♣️
Indignation	Auvic feat. Pipo Fernandez	Launch	
It Gets Better	Eskimo feat. Maria Merete	Launch	♣️
Joanna (Shut Up)	Crazy Loop	Launch	♣️
Land of The Lost	Banzai	Launch	♣️
Licky Licky	Crispy	Launch	
Lights Go Down	Less Affair	Launch	🔑 ♣️
Link Line	Asterisk	Launch	
Look Into My Eyes	Rabih	Launch	🔑
Lucky Star	Miradey	Launch	🔑
Made In China	Vitas & Sergey Pudovkin	Launch	
Medicine 2013 ~Crew 7 Edit~	Kim Leoni	Launch	🔑 ♣️
Mexi Mexi	Mozquito	Launch	⭐
Million Feelings (Dance Mix)	Chriss Floren	Launch	♣️
Monody	TheFatRat feat. Laura Brehm	Launch	♣️
Moonstone	Virgill	Launch	⭐
My Freedom	Rayman Rave & Nika Lenina	Launch	🔑
Origin	Stallian	Launch	🔑
Party All Night	KaW feat. Sam-I-Am	Launch	⭐
Party People ~KaW Hands Up Edit~	Oscillator X	Launch	
Party People (Turn it Up)	Andy Stroke	Launch	🔑
Personal Reality	Auvic	Launch	
Ready To Fly	Aleky	Launch	🔑 ♣️
Remember December	Smiley	Launch	♥️ ♣️
Reminds Me of Home	Stallian	Launch	🔑
Revenge	MonstDeath	Launch	
Rockslaves	Leo Pigot & Rinat Crane	Launch	♣️ 🔶
Run Away	Avejio	Launch	🔑
Save My World	Stephy	Launch	🔑
Secret 2K12	Rene Ablaze feat. Jacinta	Launch	🔑
Shoulda ~Tale & Dutch House Remix~	SUNN	Launch	🔑
Show Me Your Moves	Auvic feat. Pipo Fernandez	Launch	(Note: Show Me Your Moves samples "Brick House" by Commodores.)
Start & Paws	Oscillator X	Launch	♣️
Sun Goes Down	Landomania	Launch	🔑
That Night ~D-R Remix~	Eskimo and Icebird	Launch	
The 7th Element (Zariis 2015 Remake)	Vitas	Launch	
The Last Time	Zariis	Launch	
The Rainmaker ~Remix Edit~	Doug Laurent	Launch	🔑
Think Thousand Thoughts	Auvic	Launch	
Time is Ticking	Elpis feat. Black Elway	Launch	
Time To Fly	Cindy Cooper	Launch	🔑
Twins	Martin Eriksson feat. Ellee	Launch	🔑
Unity	TheFatRat	Launch	
We Are The Sun	Maui & Crizz feat. Gerald G.	Launch	🔑
What Happened To Love (Mig & Rizzo Club Mix)	Denine	Launch	♣️
Who	KaW	Launch	⭐
Y Don't U	Deeper Territory	Launch	♣️
Zodiac	Banzai	Launch	♥️ ⭐
Big Blue Bouncy Ball	Mr. Blue	March 5, 2018	
Ignition Starts	KaW	March 5, 2018	♣️ ⭐ (Note: Title BGM of Pump It Up.)
One Step Further	Jenna Drey	March 5, 2018	♣️
Surf	Hyper Potions	March 5, 2018	
Agent Blatant	Ernest + Julio	August 17, 2018	♥️
Bloodrush	TeknoDred	August 17, 2018	♥️
Da Roots	Mind Reflection	August 17, 2018	♥️
Determinator	Dust Devil	August 17, 2018	♥️
Disconnected Disco	Kid Whatever	August 17, 2018	♥️
Drifting Away	Filo Bedo	August 17, 2018	♥️
Fleadh Uncut	Ian Parker	August 17, 2018	♥️ ♣️
Flying High	Filo Bedo	August 17, 2018	♥️
Gallecode	Novus	August 17, 2018	
Go 60 Go	Takoyaki	August 17, 2018	♥️
Hispanic Panic	Chucho Merchan	August 17, 2018	♥️
Holy Guacamole	Chucho Merchan	August 17, 2018	♥️
I Think I Like That Sound	Kid Whatever	August 17, 2018	♥️ ⭐
Ize Pie	Headtwist & Pump	August 17, 2018	♥️
Land of the Rising Sun	Spacekatz	August 17, 2018	♥️
My Life Is So Crazy	Initial P	August 17, 2018	♥️
Psalm Pilot	Jason Creasey	August 17, 2018	♥️
Reactor	Jason Creasey	August 17, 2018	♥️
ROM-eo & Juli8	Nina	August 17, 2018	♥️ ♣️ 🔶
Soapy Bubble	Fragmentz	August 17, 2018	♥️
Spin Chicken	Freebie & The Bean	August 17, 2018	♥️
Temple of Boom	Yannis Kamarinos	August 17, 2018	♥️
This is Rock and Roll	DJ Zombie	August 17, 2018	♥️
While tha Rekkid Spinz	DJ Zombie	August 17, 2018	♥️ ⭐
Crazy Loop (Mm Ma Ma)	Crazy Loop	August 19, 2018	♣️ (Note: ReRave has a song similar to this song titled "Crazy Loop (Ma ma ma)".)
I Feel Sun	Gyrlie	August 19, 2018	
Paradise	Smiley	August 19, 2018	♣️
Pop4 (Darwin Remix)	Vibes & Wishdokta	August 19, 2018	† (Note: Dance Dance Revolution has a song similar to this song titled "Vol.4".) ♣️ (Note: ReRave has a song similar to this song titled "Popcorn (Darwin Remix)".)
Ra	Banzai	August 19, 2018	⭐ ♣️
Bad 4 My Health	Bassmonkeys & Soulsilver feat. J.D. ROX	August 22, 2018	♣️ 🔶
Get Busy	Bassmonkeys & Bianca Lindgren	August 22, 2018	♣️ 🔶
I'll Show You Loving	Bassmonkeys feat. Natasha Anderson	August 22, 2018	♣️
Click Bait	S3RL Feat. Gl!TCH	June 13, 2019	
Dies irae	Jason Creasey	June 13, 2019	
Ladybug	Coconut	June 13, 2019	⭐
Paranormal	Inspector K	June 13, 2019	♣️
Sunshine	Triple J	June 13, 2019	† ♥️
Sweet World	Omega Men	June 13, 2019	♥️ ♣️
Darkness	Sanxion7	January 9, 2019	♣️
Eternus	Sanxion7	January 9, 2019	†
Feel The Melody	S3RL feat. Sara	January 9, 2019	
Gargoyle	Sanxion7	January 9, 2019	⭐ ♣️
Mellow	Rikki & DAZ	January 9, 2019	♥️ 🔶
Pink Fuzzy Bunnies	Wonderboy	January 9, 2019	⭐
Rainspark	Sanxion7	January 9, 2019	⭐ ♣️
Zenith	Sanxion7	January 9, 2019	♣️
Be Alive (Raaban Inc. Remix)	Stian K	February 16, 2020	⭐ ♣️
Boom Boom Dollars (The Factory Eurotrance Remix)	King Kong & D'Jungle Girls	February 16, 2020	†
Do U Love Me	DJ Doo	February 16, 2020	♥️
Feels Just Like That Night	Eskimo & Icebird Feat. Maria Merete	February 16, 2020	⭐ ♣️
Hanky Panky (E=MC2 Mix)	Jenny Rom	February 16, 2020	⭐
July (EuroMix)	Smiley	February 16, 2020	♥️ ⭐
The Beginning	DJ Doo	February 16, 2020	♥️
Utopia	Smiley	February 16, 2020	♥️ ⭐
Xuxa	Smiley	February 16, 2020	♥️ ⭐
Ari Oh (Factory Team Eurobeat Mix)	Jenny Kee	April 3, 2020	
Beautiful Man (The Eurobeat Remix)	Radiorama	April 3, 2020	
Become Astral	Ash Astral	April 3, 2020	
Bumble Bee	Bambee	April 3, 2020	† ♥️
Coming Out	Playmaker feat. Robina	April 3, 2020	⭐ ♣️
Dizzy	Balduin & Wolfgang Lohr feat. Alanna	April 3, 2020	
Never Gonna Make (Factory Dance Team Mix)	Morgana	April 3, 2020	†
Waka Laka (E=MC2 Mix)	Jenny Rom VS. The Zippers	April 3, 2020	† ‡
Bang Bang Bang (Handsup Style Mix)	DCX	May 7, 2020	
Dance Boom Boom (The Factory Eurobeat Mix)	Tipsy & Tipsy	May 7, 2020	
Flash In The Night	Flashman	May 7, 2020	†
Hero	Miss Papaya	May 7, 2020	†
Monolith	Affinity	May 7, 2020	♥️ ⭐
Nightmoves	Playmaker	May 7, 2020	⭐ ♣️
Senorita (Speedy Mix)	Jenny Rom	May 7, 2020	‡
Typical Tropical	Bambee	May 7, 2020	† ♥️
Who R You (Beat You Edit)	Leo Pigot	May 7, 2020	♣️
Whoopsy Daisy	Wolfgang Lohr & Balduin feat. Sebastian Daws	May 7, 2020	
Young Forever	Rebecca	May 7, 2020	†
A Sign (Factory Eurobeat Team Mix)	Tipsy & Tipsy	June 17, 2020	
Esperanza	KaW	June 17, 2020	⭐
Ghosts (Vincent De Moor Mix)	Tenth Planet	June 17, 2020	†
Justify My Love	Tess	June 17, 2020	†
Move It Groove It	KaW feat. Sam-I-Am	June 17, 2020	⭐
Movin On	Ellen Gee	June 17, 2020	†
Pink Dinosaur	Miss Papaya	June 17, 2020	†
The Saint Goes Marching (Helix Remix 2020 Edit)	The Saint	June 17, 2020	† ‡
Anubis	Banzai	July 25, 2020	♥️ ⭐
Bandito	Remorse Code	July 25, 2020	
Bye Bye Baby Balloon	Joga	July 25, 2020	†
Dam Dariram	Joga	July 25, 2020	† ‡
Electric	The DNC feat. Miss Amani	July 25, 2020	⭐ ♣️
Exotica	Banzai	July 25, 2020	⭐
Music & Police	CJ Crew & KaW feat. Christian D.	July 25, 2020	† ‡
No Princess	Lynn	July 25, 2020	♥️
So Deep (Perfect Sphere Remix)	Silvertear	July 25, 2020	† ‡
Stay	Tess	July 25, 2020	†
Summer Night In Seattle	Jenna Drey	July 25, 2020	♣️
We're Getting Faster	Darwin feat. Fraz	July 25, 2020	♣️
Your Own Destiny	Entity & Darwin	July 25, 2020	♣️
Come On Now	Miss Amani	August 27, 2020	
Devil Inside	CRMNL	August 27, 2020	🔶
Dam Dadi Doo	Fantasy Project	August 27, 2020	♣️
Dolphin Talk	Pyramyth	August 27, 2020	
Fantasy	Melissa	August 27, 2020	† ‡
Get Lifted	Hot Kicks	August 27, 2020	
In My Dreams	Rebecca	August 27, 2020	(Note: Dance Freaks and Dance Maniax feature "In My Dreams (U.K. Mix)", while StepManiaX features the original version of "In My Dreams".)
Living In America	Rose & John	August 27, 2020	† ‡
Speed Over Beethoven	Rose	August 27, 2020	‡
Classic Madness	Fracus & Darwin	October 1, 2020	
Dopamine (Tale & Dutch Remix)	You In Mind	October 1, 2020	
Equinox	Mage	October 1, 2020	
Give Into	Nutronic	October 1, 2020	
I Want Your Balalaika	The Royal Eurobeat Orchestra of Bazookistan	October 1, 2020	
India's Glitch	Kirill Gramada	October 1, 2020	
July Redux	Entity	October 1, 2020	
Life Ride	Pyramyth	October 1, 2020	🔶
Mozart Is Back	Rose	October 1, 2020	
My Baby Mama	Anquette	October 1, 2020	†
Nothing Gonna Stop	Micky	October 1, 2020	†
Silence	Fracus & Darwin	October 1, 2020	
Black Magic	Matduke	October 30, 2020	♣️
Crime Time	CJ Crew & KaW feat. Sedge	October 30, 2020	†
Magic Mystery Tour	KaW feat. Paula Terry	October 30, 2020	
Night of Fright (Spooky Edit)	Justin Corza & 420	October 30, 2020	
Nightmare (Mage Remix)	FSJ feat. Tara Louise	October 30, 2020	
Pretty Ugly (Jump Smokers Remix)	Yenn	October 30, 2020	♣️ 🔶
Riddimino	Philstep	October 30, 2020	
Sky High	Lucyfer	October 30, 2020	†
Warrior	Kirill Gramada	October 30, 2020	
MAX428	Omega	October 30, 2020	
Arcade Run	Perfect Sphere	November 29, 2020	
Bring Your Lovin Back	Fracus	November 29, 2020	
Confusion	Tess	November 29, 2020	
Doh!	Tale & Dutch	November 29, 2020	
Hypnosis (BanYa Buzz Edit)	Colin Kiddy	November 29, 2020	⭐
I'm Crazy For Your Love	Black Eva	November 29, 2020	
Into My Dream (Kaveh Azizi Remix)	Lagoona	November 29, 2020	⭐
No Nobody's Love	Joga	November 29, 2020	
Bazookistan	The Royal Eurobeat Orchestra of Bazookistan	December 21, 2020	
Electro Asia	Re-venge Phoenix	December 21, 2020	
Megalovania (Chime Remix)	Toby Fox	December 21, 2020	(Note: "Megalovania" was originally featured in the 2015 video game Undertale. It is also available in Chunithm New, Groove Coaster and Taiko no Tatsujin. The song was added to various Bemani games (including Dance Dance Revolution A3, Gitadora, Sound Voltex and Pop'n Music) in 2022, and Nostalgia and Dance Rush in 2023.)
My Generation (Fat Beat Mix)	Captain Jack	December 21, 2020	†
Nori Nori Nori	Judy Crystal	December 21, 2020	† ‡
Russian Roulette	Darwin	December 21, 2020	
Spaceman	Bambee & Lynn	December 21, 2020	♥️
What Love Feels Like	Leonail	December 21, 2020	
Csikos Post (2021 Yahpp Remix)	BanYa	February 5, 2021	⭐
Delirium (T2Kazuya Remix)	Smiley	February 5, 2021	♥️ (Note: In The Groove has an unremixed version of this song titled "Delirium".) ♣️
Ma Huggies	FIG & Nico Sleator	February 5, 2021	
On My Own	Anamanaguchi feat. HANA	February 5, 2021	
Show U Love	Entity	February 5, 2021	
Take Me Away	Fracus & Darwin	February 5, 2021	
Twelve -True Fix-	Riyu Kosaka	February 5, 2021	
Beethoven Virus (2021 Yahpp Remix)	BanYa	February 27, 2021	⭐
BU-44	Naoki	February 27, 2021	
Charlene	Missing Heart	February 27, 2021	♥️ 🔶
Do It All Night (2003)	E-Rotic	February 27, 2021	† 🔶
Fall Silently	Christoph Maitland & Toby Emerson feat. Veela	February 27, 2021	♣️
Hip Hop Jam	Indiggo	February 27, 2021	♥️
Kagami (T2Kazuya Remix)	KaW	February 27, 2021	♥️ (Note: In The Groove has an unremixed version of this song titled "Kagami".)
Subzero	Donk Terrorist vs. 204	February 27, 2021	♣️
Baby Love Me	Judy Crystal	March 30, 2021	†
Critical Hit	MDK	March 30, 2021	
Forever	Schustin	March 30, 2021	
Summer (Speedy Mix)	Smiley	March 30, 2021	♥️ ⭐
Temple Of Love	E-Rotic	March 30, 2021	†
The Judgement Day	Naoki feat. Riyu Kosaka	March 30, 2021	
Winter (2021 Yahpp Remix)	BanYa	March 30, 2021	⭐ (Note: Pump It Up has a song similar to this song titled "Winter".)
Cryosleep	Machinae Supremacy	May 1, 2021	♥️
Destiny	Smiley	May 1, 2021	♥️ ⭐
Dr. M (2021 Yahpp Remix)	BanYa	May 1, 2021	⭐
Glowing In The Night (90's Radio Edit)	Schustin	May 1, 2021	⭐ (Note: It is unconfirmed if Pump It Up has a song similar to this song.)
In The Heat Of The Night	E-Rotic	May 1, 2021	†
Katana Fighter	Electron	May 1, 2021	
Sky High	DJ Miko	May 1, 2021	† ‡
Brutalisphere	Machinae Supremacy	May 29, 2021	
Butterfly	Swingrowers	May 29, 2021	
Cartoon Heroes (Speedy Mix)	Barbie Young	May 29, 2021	‡
Melancholy Vision	DE-SIRE	May 29, 2021	
Operator	Miss Papaya	May 29, 2021	†
Show U	M-Project	May 29, 2021	
Step Up Amadeus (2021 Yahpp Remix)	BanYa	May 29, 2021	⭐ (Note: Pump It Up has a song similar to this song titled "Pump Me Amadeus".)
Test My Best	E-Rotic	May 29, 2021	† 🔶
Kick It Man	KaW feat. DAZ	June 5, 2021	†
If You Can Say Goodbye (Factory Team Mix)	Kate Project	Update #17	†
Liquify	Toby Emerson	Update #17	
Paradox (StepManiaX Mix)	Naoki feat. Riyu Kosaka	Update #17	
Queen Of Light	E-Rotic	Update #17	♥️ ♣️
Ring The Alarm	M-Project & Signal	Update #17	
Say What (Pisk Electro Swing Remix)	Cut Capers	Update #17	
Contrast	Donk Terrorist vs. Daniel Seven	Update #18	
Jukebox	Swingrowers	Update #18	
Kinky Boots	Daz Sampson & Nona	Update #18	🔶
op13 -type one-	riddle	Update #18	
Turn Me On	E-Rotic	Update #18	†
Boomerang	Miss V	Update #19	
Canon D.2	Yahpp	Update #19	⭐
Closer To Heaven	Neonne	Update #19	⭐
Give You Love (Bounce Enforcerz Remix)	Daz Sampson & Katya Ocean	Update #19	
Grab It While We Can	FantastixX	Update #19	
Never Ending Story	DJ AC/DC	Update #19	†
William Tell	Quiqman	Update #19	
403 (Tokyo 2021)	Naoki Underground	Update #20	
Disco High (Scorccio Hot Vox Mix)	Ultimate Heights	Update #20	
Follow My Pamp	Andrea Damante feat. Adam Clay	Update #20	
Robot World	Oscillator X	Update #20	
Saberdance	Quiqman	Update #20	
Say Na Na Na	Serhat	Update #20	
Watch Out	Victoria	Update #20	⭐
Business Wars	Quiqman feat. Eternal JK Yoripi-chan	Update #21	
Get Up'n Move	S & K	Update #21	† ‡
Insane (Stephan F Remix)	Niko Noise	Update #21	
Lay It Down (Fresno Edit)	Tchorta & Gui Boratto	Update #21	⭐
Pump The Rhythm (Scorccio Hot Edit)	Ultimate Heights	Update #21	
We Do This Dance	Victoria	Update #21	⭐ (Note: Pump It Up has a song similar to this song titled "Power of Dream".)
Cyber-Kyoto-	Re-venG	Update #22	
Don't Stop	S & K	Update #22	
Everybody 2 The Sun (Scorccio Hot Edit)	Ultimate Heights	Update #22	(Note: "Everybody 2 The Sun" samples "Ice Ice Baby" by Vanilla Ice and "Just Can't Get Enough" by Depeche Mode.)
High On Your Love	Safura	Update #22	
Kalinka	Quiqman	Update #22	
Silent Movie (Odd Chap Remix)	Little Violet	Update #22	
Take Take	Miss V	Update #22	
The Naughty Song	Oscillator X	Update #22	♣️
Everybody Dance (Scorccio Hot Edit)	X-Rated	Update #23	
I Met You	DJ Cosmin, Ole Bott, Ammagin feat. Simon Erics	Update #23	
Katyusha (Russian Key Edit)	Schustin	Update #23	
Sing It Again	Kirk Monteux	Update #23	
Bubbles	Tokyo Machine	Update #24	
Outbreak	Feint feat. Mylk	Update #24	
Shiawase	Dion Timmer	Update #24	
The Shrimps	Vertigini	Update #24	
7th Trip (80's-00's)	NM underground artifact	Update #25	
Fade Out	Bensley	Update #25	
Here For You	PIXL feat. Q'AILA	Update #25	
Recovery	JMCX	Update #25	
Dystopia 2077	F.O.O.L & The Forgotten	Update #26	
Moonlight	PIXY	Update #26	
Press Start	MDK	Update #26	
The Call of Wilderness	Electron	Update #26	
Just Do It	Swingrowers	Update #27	
Liberar Vida	Scorccia	Update #27	
Meta Dreadnaught	Machinae Supremacy	Update #27	
We Got The Moves	Electric Callboy	Update #27	🔶
Dark Fenix	DE-SIRE	Update #27	
Art City	Virgill	Update #28	⭐
Bewitched	PIXY	Update #28	
Cosmic Drive	Quiqman	Update #28	
Have Fun	Rameses B	Update #28	♣️
Pump It	Electric Callboy	Update #28	🔶
All For One	IVD x Dee Dee x Kenny Hayes	Update #29	
How We Win	FWLR	Update #29	
Ooh La La La	E-Rotic	Update #29	
Stop Me	Natsume Oki	Update #29	
Villain	PIXY	Update #29	
VTubers Never Die! (RE-incarnation MIX)	Naoki & Eternal JK Yoripi-chan feat. Riyu Kosaka	Update #29	(Note: This is a remix of "VTuber死なない (VTubers Never Die!)" by Eternal JK Yoripi-chan with Ayatsugu_Otowa)
Para-Symptoms	165	Update #30	
Rainbow Rave Parade	Chime	Update #30	
Space Boy	Rameses B, Feint & Veela	Update #30	
Trigger	CraXy	Update #30	🔶
Bust It Out	FWLR	Update #31	
Demon's World	CJ Crew	Update #31	
Energizer	ZiGZaG	Update #31	♥️ ⭐
TURBO	Tokyo Machine	Update #31	
Dance	Sophon	Update #32	
Only You	Dexter King feat. Alexis Donn	Update #32	
STOP! & Go	Onyx	Update #32	⭐
Vodka	The Royal Eurobeat Orchestra of Bazookistan	Update #32	
Good Feeling	More Plastic & imallryt	Update #33	
INEEDU	Teddy Killerz	Update #33	
Right Into You	The Tech Team	Update #33	
WYGD	Bishu	Update #33	
Midnight Train	More Plastic & Tylah Winyard	Update #33	
Get Busy	KOYOTIE	Update #34	(Note: Get Busy (Koyotie version) is also featured in Just Dance 2020.)
Ievan Polka	Quiqman feat. Chihiro Kawakami	Update #34	(Note: Ievan Polka is a remix of the original Ievan Polkka.)
Lemmings On The Run	E-Rotic	Update #34	♥️
Orbit	Ellis	Update #34	
Perks	Bibi Gold	Update #34	
Crab Rave	Noisestorm	Update #??	
Born to Run	Red Parker	Update #35	
EMEA (Europe Middle East Africa)	Re-venG	Update #35	
Forever and a Day (Fracus & Darwin Remix)	Dy5on Feat. Silver Angelina	Update #35	
Hava Nagila	Quiqman	Update #35	
Therapy	Conro	Update #35	
Bambole (Ole)	Papa Gonzales	Update #36	⭐
Bassline Shatter	M-Project & S2i8	Update #36	
Just Dance	Bad Computer	Update #36	
Make It Tonight	Fracus & Darwin feat. Jake	Update #36	
Northern Lights	Saxsquatch	Update #36	
Do My Thing	PRTY ANML	Update #37	
Down Low	Hr. Troels x Felix Schorn	Update #37	
Nothing Else Matters	Katya Ocean	Update #37	
Samurai	Rameses B	Update #37	
Techno World	NAOKI underground	Update #37	
2NITE	nanobii	Update #38	
A Little Love	Glitterati	Update #38	🔶
Blackstar	Celldweller	Update #38	
Stockholm To Bombay	Dr. Bombay	Update #38	
Work	Stella Mwangi	Update #38	
Love Arcade (Dance 'n' Thrash SMX Edit)	Bending Grid	Update #39	
Poco Loco	Carlito	Update #39	⭐
Rad	Tokyo Machine	Update #39	
Sirens	RENOLD X Scarlett	Update #39	
The Other Side	Au5 & Chime	Update #39	
Arsene's Bazaar	James Landino	Update #40	
Every Little Thing	Conro	Update #40	
Galactical	Tokyo Machine	Update #40	
Love	Ari Dayan	Update #40	
Night In Motion	Cubic 22	Update #40	†
Asian Night In 20XX	NM Japan	Update #41	
Dream of You	Bishu	Update #41	
Fiesta Night	Carlito	Update #41	
Swipe	Felix Schorn	Update #41	
UFO	Little Sis Nora & S3RL	Update #41	
All Starts Now	Laurell	Update #42	
Breathe Me Back To Life	Stonebank feat. Lena Sue	Update #42	
Candy Pop	Luv Limited NM	Update #42	
The 7 Jump	Ken-D	Update #42	†
To Your Beat	S3RL feat. Hannah Fortune	Update #42	
Do It Like That	Mad Circuit, LG (Team Genius), Sereda	Update #43	
Keep On Dancing	BEAUZ feat. Heleen	Update #43	
Low Workout	Fracus & Darwin	Update #43	
Stars	James Landino	Update #43	
Y2Z	Affinity	Update #43	⭐
Boogeyman	Wizardz of Oz	Update #44	
Halloween Scream	Bigshot Bo And The Swing Crusaders	Update #44	
The Bass & The Melody	S3RL	Update #44	
Under The Bed	Macks Wolf X Tatsunoshin	Update #44	
BLEEP BLOOP	Tokyo Machine	Update #45	
Elysium	Scott Brown	Update #45	
Party	ChildsPlay	Update #45	
Supernova	Laszlo	Update #45	
Jingle Bell Rock	KaW feat. Bobby Helms	Update #46	
Definition of a Badboy	Scott Brown	Update #47	
Kibo	Dion Timmer	Update #47	
Let's Remember	N.M.R	Update #47	
Never Let You Down (StepManiaX Edit)	BEAUZ, Miles Away, & RYYZN	Update #47	
Fearless	Rolling Quartz	Update #48	
Got Good Vibes	MO XO	Update #48	
Tick Tock (Quickdrop Remix)	Technikore	Update #48	
Truth or Dare	PIXY	Update #48	
Zen	Re-venG	Update #48	
Beat It	from20	Update #49	
Electronic City Pops	TOKYO twilight scene	Update #49	
Heaven On Earth	HELLO GLOOM	Update #49	
Music Is Moving	Tatsunoshin	Update #49	
My Salsa	Carlito	Update #49	
Big Boss	Big Boss	Update #50	
Color My Love	Fun Fun	Update #50	
FAR OUT	Tokyo Machine	Update #50	
Herrscher Of Finality	Omega	Update #50	
What Ya Gonna Do	Scott Brown	Update #50	(Note: "What Ya Gonna Do" by Scott Brown was used as the menu music in a leak of the unreleased video game In the Groove 3. The song art for "What Ya Gonna Do" in StepManiaX is based on an In the Groove 3 promotional flyer.)
Accelerate	Teminite & Skybreak	Update #51	
Bad Revenge	from20	Update #51	
Fly Me High	@pple & Pie	Update #51	
Mothership	F.O.O.L & SKUM	Update #51	
Rock Me Forever	Nevada	Update #51	
Dancing In The Dark	HELLO GLOOM	Update #52	
DMT	Technikore	Update #52	🔶
Everybody Get Up	Tempo feat. Manola	Update #52	
SPEED KING	David Kane	Update #52	
Where Did You Go	Tatsunoshin	Update #52	
Burbank Nights	Dirtyphonics	Update #53	
DJ Party	BB Hayes	Update #53	♥️
Falling In Love	No Hero & Nino Rivera	Update #53	
Need You	Nostalgix	Update #53	
Take Me Away (Summa Jae Remix)	Dougal	Update #53	
Way to Rio	Tony T	Update #53	
Angel	Wynona	Update #54	
Daydream	Danny Leax	Update #54	
Drum 'N' Bossa (2007 Vocal Edit)	Carbuncle	Update #54	
GOAT	2BT3K	Update #54	
Hero of the Night	David Kane	Update #54	
Love Toxic ~quiet passion~	FACTOR-X	Update #55	
Lunatic	BLACK HOLE	Update #55	
Parallel Universe	Omega	Update #55	
Paranoid	180	Update #55	
戦国 (Sengoku)	Re-venG	Update #55	
Baila Bolero	Fun Fun	Update #56	
Be Alright	Red Parker	Update #56	
Set My Heart On Fire	Rocket Man	Update #56	
Total Nuclear Annihilation (SMX Remix)	Scott Danesi	Update #56	
Happy Holiday	Luv Limited -NM-	Update #57	
Running In The 90s (2023)	Max Coveri	Update #57	
Dreaming	Conro	Update #58	
Pilgrim 2000	Bass-X vs. Scott Brown	Update #58	
When The Sun Goes Down	Ken Blast	Update #58	
I Don't Wanna Fall (StepManiaX Edit)	Jakka-B & Macks Wolf feat. Angel Lane	Update #59	
My Heart Is Ticking Like A Bomb	E-Rotic	Update #59	🔶
Night In Tokyo	N.M.R	Update #59	
You Can Win	Luke	Update #59	
MEANT 2 BE (SMX Edit)	THIRST & nuphory	Update #60	
No Rules	Foxela & Britt Lari	Update #60	
Polarised	Koven, ÆON:MODE, Blanke	Update #60	
Remember Me	Leslie Parrish	Update #60	
Halley's Comet (Zillionaire Remix)	Jenna Drey & Joe Bermudez	Update #61	
Over The Top	M-Project & Vau Boy	Update #61	
Rain Dance	MUZZ	Update #61	
Redshift	F.O.O.L	Update #61	
Ekstasis	d-complex	Update #62	
Falling in Love Again	Naoki feat. Paula Terry	Update #62	(Note: There is a secret alternative version of this song that can play when selecting this song in the game, with different melodies and uses vocals by Riyu Kosaka instead of Paula Terry. That seems to appear randomly at roughly 1 percent rate (not confirmed).)
Go! Rocky Joe	Maximum Power	Update #62	
In The Echo	Koven	Update #62	
Letting Go	Bensley & Voicians	Update #62	
Ori Ori	MAANTRA	Update #63	
Ping Pong	AronChupa & Little Sis Nora	Update #63	
Pure Ecstasy	M-Project	Update #63	
Running Ninja	Eurofunk	Update #63	
The Banana Song	SIPPY	Update #63	
Vegas (Red Note Mix)	NAOKI underground feat. BOBBY	Update #63	
Proper Rhythm (SMX Mix)	peak divide	Update #64	
Boogie Shoes	AronChupa & Little Sis Nora	Update #65	
Calling	Donots	Update #65	
Strange Stubborn Proud	ELYXR Feat. Kurt Harland Larson	Update #65	
Why Me	Desire	Update #65	♥️
Worn Out Tapes [Tally-Ho Version] (SMX Mix)	peak divide	Update #65	
Bad Boy	E-Rotic	Update #66	
Every Time I Close My Eyes	Scott Brown & Gillian Tennant	Update #66	
Forever Now (SMX Mix)	peak divide	Update #66	
Frontal Impact	Daniel	Update #66	
Revolution	Naoki	Update #66	
Bella Ciao (SMX Mix)	BEAUZ & XYSM	Update #67	
Let's Go! (This is It) (SMX Mix)	2 The Limit	Update #67	
My X	Little Sis Nora	Update #67	
Sevillana Mirage	Re-venG	Update #67	
When I Lose Control	Desire	Update #67	
Daydream Therapy	Joe Bermudez feat. Dana Mckeon	Update #68	
Mm-Hmm	W3WAY	Update #68	
Singin' Every Nite (Obladì Obladai)	Paso vs. Maximus	Update #68	
Under The Moonlight	M-Project	Update #68	
Waiting	KUURO feat. Bianca	Update #68	
Euphoria Rush	CHYL & Skybreak	Update #69	
King of Fire	Max Casanova	Update #69	
Morning Call	U-Chae feat. Uki Satake	Update #69	
Uncanny Valley (ELYXR Remix)	Freezepop	Update #69	
Alamo Drop Blues	N.M.R.	Update #70	
I See	Codeko	Update #70	
London Bridge	SCI Guyz	Update #70	
Old School	Rameses B	Update #70	
Death By Glamour (VGR Remix)	Toby Fox	Update #71	
BUSTED	Boom Kitty & Teminite & Tokyo Machine	Update #72	
Get Away (SMX Mix)	Modana	Update #72	
Neptune The First	Black ∞ Hole	Update #72	
Rubix Cube	Rusko	Update #72	
Ancient Tech	Mameyudoufu	Update #73	
Better Now (Tatsunoshin Remix)	JTS	Update #73	
Hands Up, Touch The Sky	NAOKI feat. NOVA	Update #73	
Chemical Love	Kevin & Cherry	Update #74	
Street Level	NXSTY	Update #74	
Stylewave	Waterflame	Update #74	
Knock	VIZZEN	Update #75	
Lifted Me Up	CloudNone and Micah Martin	Update #75	
On My Own	Nostalgix & ALRT	Update #75	
Nocturne	Hyper Potions & MDK	Update #76	
Samurai Heart	Quiqman feat. AKANE	Update #76	
Love Goes On	JMCX	Update #76	
Hyper Rave	NAOKI	Update #77	
Nyaw (V Mix)	PaperKitty	Update #77	
Tribal Style	KaW	Update #77	
Amour Tragique Et Liberté	NAOKI underground × DE-SIRE	Update #78	
Ghost In The Rave	NAOKI PH4NT0M	Update #78	
Lucky Lucky (SMX Mix)	Lucky One	Update #78	
Tug Of War (Dan Heale Remix)	Joe Bermudez feat. Dana Mckeon	Update #78	
Guess Who's Back	AWU	Update #79	
Oasis	KaW	Update #79	
The Feeling (Big Orgus)	Calumny and DJ Furax	Update #79	
Flow Of Oblivion	N.M.R	Update #80	
Moshi Moshi	Smile.dk	Update #80	
Ultrasound	Pirapus & Arcando	Update #80	
Kingdom	rejection	Update #81	
Mother's Echo	NAOKI underground	Update #81	
Talk	BHAVIOR	Update #81	
HEART	Tokyo Machine	Update #82	
The Thing You Call Love 2026 (SMX Mix)	Fiddesan feat. Tlyyysa	Update #82	
This is Revolution	Chris Accardo	Update #82	
You Gotta Go Go	Synatrick & Anita Doth	Update #82	
Bounce	Cleo Mars	Update #83	
Happy Trails	Mameyudoufu	Update #83	
Neon Rausch	NAOKI underground	Update #84	
Liquid Moon	Inspector K	Update #84	♥️
Don't Stop	Giulio Cercato	Update #85	
La La Lucky	Lucky One	Update #85	
Let's Race	VIZZEN ft. MIAU & CODE BREAKERZ	Update #85	
Resonance Remains	Naoki - Anima	Update #85	

KPop Demon Hunters Dance Battle Version Songlist
Song Title	Song Artist
Golden	Huntrix
How It's Done	Huntrix
Soda Pop	Saja Boys
Takedown	Huntrix
What It Sounds Like	Huntrix
Your Idol	Saja Boys

StepManiaX Update History (before June 29, 2021)
Order of sequence of online update	Release date	Number of songs
1st	March 5, 2018	4
2nd	August 17, 2018	24
3rd	June 13, 2019	6
4th	January 9, 2020	8
5th	February 16, 2020	9
6th	April 3, 2020	8
7th	May 7, 2020	11
8th	June 17, 2020	8
9th	July 25, 2020	13
10th	August 27, 2020	9
11th	October 1, 2020	12
12th	October 30, 2020	10
13th	November 29, 2020	8
14th	December 21, 2020	8
15th	February 5, 2021	7
16th	February 27, 2021	8
17th	March 30, 2021	7
18th	May 1, 2021	7
19th	May 29, 2021	8
20th	June 5, 2021	1

StepManiaX Update History (since June 29, 2021)
Order of sequence of online update	Update Version	Release date	Number of songs
21st	Update #17	June 29, 2021	6
22nd	Update #18	August 4, 2021	5
23rd	Update #19	September 3, 2021	7
24th	Update #20	October 8, 2021	7
25th	Update #21	November 11, 2021	6
26th	Update #22	December 31, 2021	8
27th	Update #23	February 7, 2022	4
28th	Update #24	March 2, 2022	4
29th	Update #25	March 30, 2022	4
30th	Update #26	April 29, 2022	4
31st	Update #27	June 4, 2022	5
32nd	Update #28	June 30, 2022	5
33rd	Update #29	July 26, 2022	6
34th	Update #30	August 24, 2022	4
35th	Update #31	August 25, 2022	4
36th	Update #32	October 1, 2022	4
37th	Update #33	October 29, 2022	5
38th	Update #34	November 16, 2022	5
39th	Update #??	December 14, 2022	1
40th	Update #35	January 10, 2023	5
41st	Update #36	February 11, 2023	5
42nd	Update #37	March 28, 2023	5
43rd	Update #38	April 30, 2023	5
44th	Update #39	May 27, 2023	5
45th	Update #40	June 26, 2023	5
46th	Update #41	July 28, 2023	5
47th	Update #42	September 6, 2023	5
48th	Update #43	October 6, 2023	5
49th	Update #44	October 27, 2023	4
50th	Update #45	November 16, 2023	4
51st	Update #46	December 12, 2023	1
52nd	Update #47	January 17, 2024	4
53rd	Update #48	March 1, 2024	5
54th	Update #49	March 31, 2024	5
55th	Update #50	May 4, 2024	5
56th	Update #51	June 7, 2024	5
57th	Update #52	July 11, 2024	5
58th	Update #53	August 23, 2024	6
59th	Update #54	September 29, 2024	5
60th	Update #55	October 24, 2024	5
61st	Update #56	November 22, 2024	4
62nd	Update #57	December 24, 2024	2
63rd	Update #58	January 16, 2025	3
64th	Update #59	February 25, 2025	4
65th	Update #60	March 29, 2025	4
66th	Update #61	April 9, 2025	4
67th	Update #62	May 30, 2025	5
68th	Update #63	July 1, 2025	6
69th	Update #64	July 12, 2025	1
70th	Update #65	August 20, 2025	5
71st	Update #66	August 22, 2025	5
72nd	Update #67	August 24, 2025	5
73rd	Update #68	September 25, 2025	5
74th	Update #69	October 31, 2025	4
75th	Update #70	November 24, 2025	4
76th	Update #71	December 25, 2025	1
77th	Update #72	January 13, 2026	4
78th	Update #73	February 10, 2026	3
79th	Update #74	February 25, 2026	3
80th	Update #75	March 19, 2026	3
81st	Update #76	April 18, 2026	3
82nd	Update #77	May 3, 2026	3
83rd	Update #78	June 19, 2026	4
84th	Update #79	July 25, 2026	3
85th	Update #80	August 27, 2026	3
86th	Update #81	August 28, 2026	3
87th	Update #82	August 31, 2026	4
88th	Update #83	September 24, 2026	2
89th	Update #84	October 31, 2026	2
90th	Update #85	November 19, 2026	4

Removed Songs
Song Title	Song Artist	Release date	Date Removed	Notes
All It Takes	Zariis	Launch	August 17, 2021	
Hurry Up!	MonstDeath	Launch	August 17, 2021	Remix of "Sabre Dance" by Aram Khachaturian
Sinxorder	MonstDeath	Launch	August 17, 2021	
Chica Bomb	Dan Balan	August 19, 2018	August 17, 2021	♣️

Notes:

- † This song has a similar song from Dance Dance Revolution other than Extreme. Total of 44 songs.
- ‡ This song has a similar song from Dance Dance Revolution Extreme. Total of 13 songs.
- ♥️ This song has a similar song from the In the Groove series. Total of 56 songs.
- ⭐ This song has a similar song from the Pump It Up series. Total of 52 songs.
- ♣️ This song has a similar song from the ReRave series. Total of 58 (57 current and 1 removed) songs.
- 🔑 This song must be purchased by the arcade operator. Total of 28 songs.
- 🔶 This song is not available with Family Filter enabled. Total of 18 songs.

== Mobile App ==
StepManiaX also features a mobile app, titled StepManiaX Link, that allows players to log into the game and save scores and modifiers. This allows players to save progress and compete in online leaderboards.

In May of 2023, Edit Mode was announced and released for StepManiaX Link. This allowed for users to create custom step patterns on a mobile device and play them by logging into a machine. This feature does not allow users to import their own music, but instead create custom step patterns for existing licensed music on the retail game.

== Reception ==
StepManiaX has been met with generally positive reviews, both for its hardware and the game itself, compared to other dance games such as Dance Dance Revolution and Pump It Up.

In 2018, Wilcox Arcade stated that StepManiaX is welcoming to the American arcade industry, while Arcade Heroes reported that the booth seemed popular with vendors at IAAPA 2021.

Gemu Baka praised the machine during his time at BASHCon 2020 as the best alternative to Dance Dance Revolution, as the latter game remains exclusive to Round 1 and Dave & Buster's in North America. As of 2024, Dave & Buster's existing Dance Dance Revolution games no longer receive the latest version, reducing the availability to just Round 1.

Reception of StepManiaX hardware has been generally positive, citing durability, more easily adjustable sensitivity, easier maintenance, options for customization, and quality of customer support. For the dedicated game itself, the majority of the praise comes from the large song library and its focus on otherwise neglected dance music genres, and lack of subscription fees or unlocks. Internet connections are only needed for content updates and automatic upload of user scores and preferences, and so completely offline StepManiaX setups are more complete in function than their competitors.

StepManiaX has been criticized for limited supply availability and having no support for cheaper, non-standard home offerings, such as video game console and personal computer versions. While stages are available on their own to private customers, restocking happens infrequently and sales periods typically only last for a few minutes. The high demand for these items increased during the COVID-19 pandemic, as many arcades remained closed or had limited reopenings.

StepManiaX's relative newness, position within current family entertainment center industry trends, and its advertised return on investment has led to some operators setting generally higher prices per credit compared to the games it is meant to replace from years prior. These pricing changes have led to criticism from dedicated players, as this new pricing is more catered to infrequent casual experiences and is less conducive to dedicated practice and repeat play.

As of May 2026, the amount of publicly tracked retail locations reported by the fan-run website https://zenius-i-vanisher.com/v5.2/arcades.php is 587, outpacing the availability of updated and official installations of Dance Dance Revolution as well as the company's previous arcade efforts with both ReRave and In The Groove. Additional locations are listed on the company's official location tracker but there is no numerical value displayed.

== Trivia ==
- During development and early releases of the game, "Beginner" mode was titled "Basic". This was later updated to ease new players into the game and clarify the mode name.
- Early prototype videos of stage hardware showed input panels on the corners (upper-left, upper-right, lower-left, and lower-right), but this was never intended to be a mode within the StepManiaX software, but was instead a test for the home consumer market having software ambiguity compatibility.
- Many team members who work on StepManiaX were involved with fan games or other rhythm game projects in the past.
- StepManiaX is the first full game franchise created under the Step Revolution company name entirely, with the company being called Step Evolution and featuring different staff for previous projects.

== See also ==
- Dance pad
- Roxor Games
- In the Groove (video game)
