= Bambee =

Norwegian singer (born 1976)

- Also known as: Bambee
- Born: Desirée Jane Sparre-Enger; June 25, 1976 (age 50); Saint Ashton and Irkines City, British Solomon Islands Protectorate (now Solomon Islands)
- Origin: Nordstrand, Oslo, Norway
- Genre: Eurodance
- Occupations: Musician; singer
- Years active: 1997–2002, 2025–present
- Label: CNR Music Modern Entertainment Boomed AS

Desirée Jane Sparre-Enger (born June 25, 1976), mostly known by her stage name Bambee, is a Solomonese-born Norwegian Eurodance singer originated from Nordstrand, Oslo. Several of her more popular songs, including "Cowgirl", "Seventeen" and "Bumble Bee", have appeared in the Dance Dance Revolution and In the Groove game series.

== History ==
Bambee was born in the Solomon Islands to a Grenadian mother and a Norwegian father. She used the name Bambee as a reference to her eyes, comparable to those of a deer. Originally, she considered using the name Bambi, but she changed the spelling to avoid copyright issues with Disney.

Bambee's debut album, On Ice, was released in December 1999 in Japan and then in Norway in April 2000, where it peaked at No. 33 on the VG-lista chart. Her second album, Fairytales, was released in June 2001. In 2002, a third album was in the works for Bambee, but for unknown reasons, the album was shelved.

In January 2024, a German company called Modern Entertainment acquired the digital rights to her music, and released a sped up version of her song "Bumble Bee" after it had grown in popularity on TikTok.

Bambee was not active until June 2025 when she announced on her Instagram that she would be making new music, possibly due to the aforementioned comeback of her song "Bumble Bee". However, as of February 2026, she had not yet announced a new album. On the 6th of March, her song she recorded in 2025, called "Bambeeland", was released, making it her first song to be released after 24 years.

== Discography ==
=== Albums ===
- On Ice (1999)
- Fairytales (2001)

=== Singles ===
- "Candy Girl" (1997)
- "Bam Bam Bam" (1998)
- "Typical Tropical" (1999)
- "You Are My Dream" (1999)
- "Seventeen" (2001)
- "Cowgirl" (2001)
- "Watch Out" (2001)
- "Bumble Bee" (2024)
- "Bambeeland" (2026)
- "Red Rider" (2026)
- "Buzzin' (Radio Edit)" (2026)

=== Other popular songs ===
- "Baby Baby" (1999)
- "Red, Yellow, Green & Blue" (2001)
- "Spaceman" (2001)

=== Video games ===
Bambee has a total of 4 songs which appear in the Dance Dance Revolution arcade game series. In the Groove 2 and StepManiaX also feature two of these songs, plus "Baby Baby" (in In the Groove 2 only) and "Spaceman" (from Bambee and Lynn).

Song	Arcade game									StepManiaX availability
Song	2000	3rd	4th	5th	MAX	MAX2	Ex	ITG2	SMX	StepManiaX availability
"Typical Tropical"	Yes							Yes	Yes	May 6, 2020
"Bumble Bee"		(Note: 3rd Mix Plus edition only.)	Yes	Yes				Yes	Yes	April 2, 2020
"17才"				Yes						—N/a
"Cowgirl"					Yes	Yes	Yes			—N/a
"Baby Baby"								Yes		—N/a
"Spaceman"								(Note: Credited to Lynn.)	Yes	December 20, 2020
