= Euphoric (disambiguation) =

Euphoric means feeling great well-being or intense happiness.

Euphoric may also refer to:

- Euphoric (album), by Georgia, 2023
- Euphoric (EP), by Delerium, 1991
- Euphoric (record label), a subsidiary of Almighty Records

== See also ==
- Euphoria (disambiguation)
