= On Ice (Bambee album) =

Studio album by Bambee
- Released: 8 December 1999 (Japan); 4 April 2000 (Scandinavia)
- Recorded: September 8, 1997 – November 3, 1999
- Genre: Eurodance
- Length: 37:13
- Labels: CNR Music, EMI Music Japan, Avex Trax
- Producer: Honeycutt

Bambee chronology
On Ice (1999)	Fairytales (2001)

Singles from On Ice
- 1. "Candy Girl" Released: 1997; 2. "Bam Bam Bam" Released: February 3, 1998; 3. "Typical Tropical" Released: 1999; 4. "You Are My Dream" Released: 1999; 5. "Bumble Bee" Released: January 19, 2024

On Ice is the debut album by Norwegian pop singer Bambee, released in Scandinavia in 2000.

== Production ==
The album was supposed to be released by Scandinavian Records, and the first single "Candy Girl" was released already in 1997. The song was branded as a parody of "Barbie Girl", replete with the same style of high-pitched vocals sung by Lene Nystrøm in the latter song. For the time being, a full-length Bambee album did not materialize, until she was signed by CNR Music under the Arcade Records umbrella.

The track "Bumble Bee" was featured in the Dance Dance Revolution video game series, specifically the 3rdMIX and 4thMIX installments. "Bumble Bee" also appeared in the video game In The Groove 2 along with "Baby Baby" and "Typical Tropical". "Typical Tropical" has also appeared in Dance Dance Revolution Solo 2000 and an unknown YouTube channel uploaded its music video, and was never released on Bambee's. The same thing goes for the music video of "You Are My Dream", which shows Bambee perform the song live with background dancers. On the 13th of February 2026, a lyric video for "Bumble Bee" was published.

== Charts ==
The album charted on the Norwegian VG-lista for two weeks, peaking at #33.

== Reviews ==
Reviweing the album for Norway's largest newspaper VG, Stein Østbø maintained that Bambee tried to resemble Aqua, more specifically the kind of music the Danish-Norwegian group had made several years ago. Thus, Bambee was "a bit late" with her effort. The album was nevertheless "far from the worst and most overbearing" within the bubblegum dance genre. Several of the songs were "occasionally very catchy". VG bestowed a dice throw of 3 (out of 6) upon On Ice. Similarly, Helge Ottesen in Varden admitted that On Ice was "captivating for a short time, but like the bubblegum that gave bubblegum dance its name, the longevity was very short. Ottesen accused the music of being serially produced and criticised the lyrics.

Fredriksstad Blad awarded a dice throw of 2. While the album resembled Aqua so much that it could be called a copy, it came nowhere near the idol in terms of quality: "It does not impress. To my ears, this is an unspeakably slippery, bland and boring release. The English lyrics are seething with clichés and frivolities and should preferably be passed over in silence. Musically, there is not much to brag about either. The 11 songs are all wrapped in hectic but oh so stereotypical dance rhythms". The dice throw of 2 was also given by Drammens Tidende.

Sunnmørsposten were negative as well. There was "nothing wrong with being commercial and catchy. That's what we want. Seemingly". However, this product was not made "in a proper fashion", and it lacked "some effort and a bit of seriousness". No one could defend On Ice without being guilty of "a mockery of every bright person over fourteen and a half years old". However, Rune Slyngstad in Nordlandsposten gave the lowest possible grade with a dice throw of 1. On Ice was "helpless pop without sting and meaning; so full of clichés both in terms of lyrics and melody", with songs that appeared "dated and thin".

== Track listing ==
No.	Title	Writer(s)	Producer(s)	Length
1.	"Typical Tropical"	Linnéa Handberg, Honeycutt	Honeycutt	3:03
2.	"Supermodel"	Peak	Honeycutt	3:18
3.	"Amigo"	Sune Munkholm Pedersen, Jens C. Ringdal	Honeycutt	3:28
4.	"Wham Bam Boogie"	Nick Buus, Henrik Fevre	Honeycutt	3:21
5.	"Let The Sun Shine In"	Handberg, Honeycutt	Honeycutt	3:02
6.	"Bumble Bee"	Handberg, Honeycutt	Honeycutt	3:15
7.	"You Are My Dream"	Thomas Ekle	Honeycutt	3:37
8.	"Bam Bam Bam"	Per Christian Frankplads, Truls Johansen, Håvard Sylte	DJ Howard, Frankplads, Johansen	3:09
9.	"Baby Baby"	Michael Kjeldgaard, Marlene Tellef	Honeycutt	3:13
10.	"Il Ritmo dell' Amore"	Handberg, Honeycutt	Honeycutt	3:27
11.	"Candy Girl" (Y2K Edit)	Bambee, Frankplads, Johansen, Sylte	DJ Howard, Frankplads, Johansen	4:02

=== Notes ===
- "Il ritmo dell' amore" translates to "the rhythm of love".
