= Surfact =

Danish band

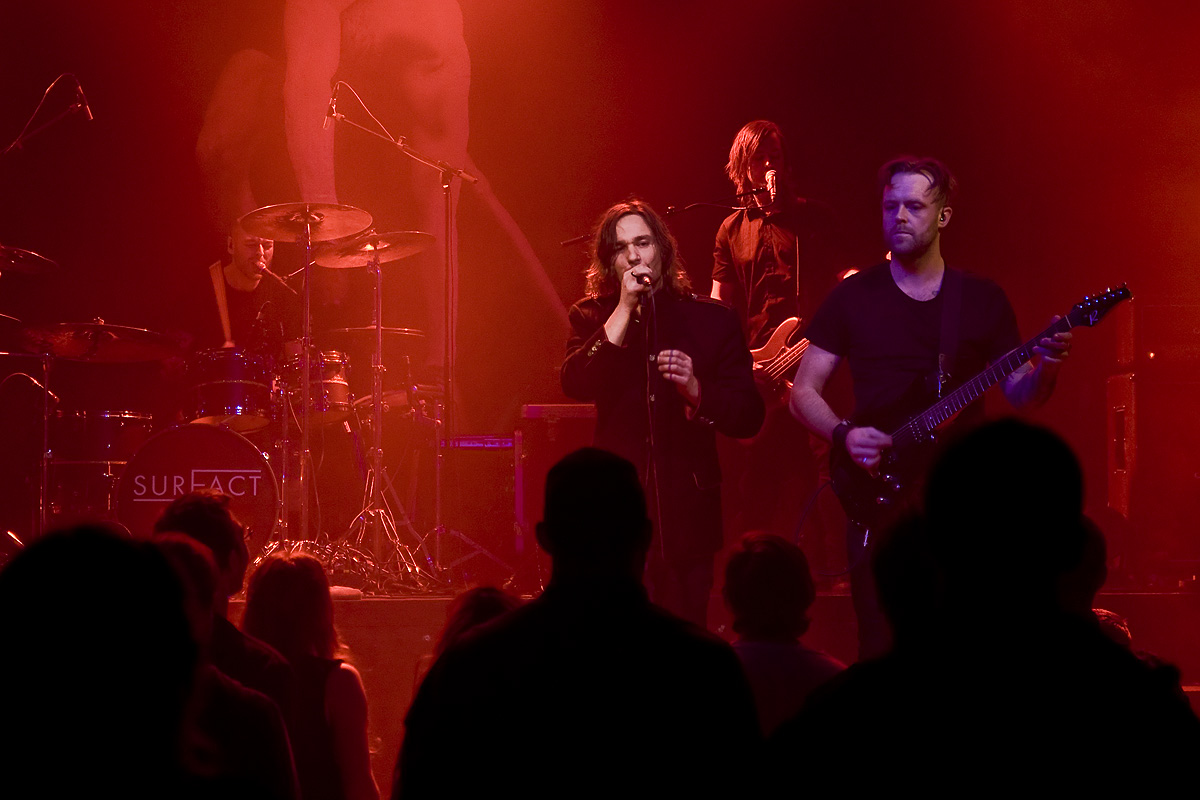
- Surfact

Background information
- Origin: Horsens, Denmark
- Genres: Hard rock, post-grunge
- Years active: 2003–2014
- Label: Transbam
- Members: Jesper Storgaard; Claus Bach; Martin Kristoffersen; Niels Lykke Rasmussen; Jeppe Sig
- Website: https://www.facebook.com/surfact

Surfact were a Danish rock band formed in 2003.

They first got noticed in 2006 when they won the Starfighters competition, and subsequently released their debut album Terrific Downfall. Although they didn't break through commercially until 2009 when they released their second album Euphoria, which spawned the hit singles "Absolutely Shameless" and "All Night Overload".

Their song "Fuel" from the 2009 "Euphoria" album was used in the end-credits of "The Mothman" (2010).

The band toured both Europe and the United States, but are mostly known in Scandinavia. On May 12, 2014, the band announced on their Facebook page that they had played their last show and would not be continuing as a band.

== Discography ==
=== Albums ===
- 2006: Terrific Downfall
- 2009: Euphoria
- 2011: Feeding the Beast
