= Jenna Drey =

American singer-songwriter

- Born: Los Angeles, California, U.S.
- Mother: Margaret Teele
- Musical career
- Genres: Dance-pop; dance music
- Occupation: Singer-songwriter

Jenna Drey is a multi-time Billboard Charting dance music artist, as well as American female singer-songwriter. Her biggest dance hit was "By The Way," which charted on Billboard Dance/Mix Show Airplay chart for 16 consecutive weeks peaking at #4 on April 7, 2007 and stayed on Billboard until May 19th, 2007. Her other Billboard charting songs included "Why Should I Believe You," and "Killin' Me." She was born in Los Angeles, California, and resides in Miami, Florida. She is a classically trained three-octave vocalist and pianist who studied at the New England Conservatory in Boston, Massachusetts, in theory and composition.

== Career ==
Drey's early career began as a songwriter. She won over eight multiple songwriting awards including the 2004 VH1 Songwriting Contest, the Gibson Guitar Dallas Songwriting Contest for "Stand in Line" and the grand prize in the 6th Great American Song Contest for her song "Impossibility". Jenna continued onto becoming a Finalist with her song, "Killin' Me," in the largest International Songwriting Competition in the world, known as the "ISC." Here writers compete from over 11,000 entries from 77 countries. "Killin' Me," eventually went on to become her first radio Billboard radio charting single. But these songwriting awards are what caught the attention of TAXI music CEO Michael Lakow which led to "Just Like That" being produced by the legendary Nile Rodgers. This song was additionally adopted as the battle song for the 2004 World Series Champions, the Boston Red Sox using the "Just Like That Sports Theme" which was included on the Album CD. The chorus of the song, revised to "Reverse the Curse, Just Like That", played at the televised home games, reaching an audience of over 12.5 million baseball fans each week. This continued with Song of the Year Contest for a win in two categories for best dance song and pop song.

After teaming up with co-writer and producer Kevin Churko, multiple Juno Award-winning producer-writer whose credits include Shania Twain, Ozzy Osbourne, Five Finger Death Punch and more, a number of her songs succeeded on the charts. In 2005, "Killin' Me (Where Did I Go Wrong)" rose to number 11 on Billboard's Hot Dance Airplay and number 6 on the Hot Dance Music/Club Play chart. The follow-up, "Why Should I Believe You", peaked in Billboard's Hot Dance Airplay at number 24 and the Hot Dance Music/Club Play Top 10 in 2006. Even the renowned music critic for the Houston Chronicle, Joey Guerra, describes "Killin Me" as a hypnotic tale of lost love.

Later that year, Drey was signed to top dance record label Robbins Entertainment, known for their smash Top 40 hits like Cascada "Everytime We Touch," September "Cry for You." Label President, Cory Robbins, signed her to release her next dance-pop single "By the Way". It became her most successful single on Billboard's Hot Dance Airplay chart, peaking at number 4, maintaining a chart position for 16 weeks. On the Dance Club Songs chart, it was her third consecutive top-twenty hit, reaching number 19.

In fall 2008, Robbins Entertainment released her single "All Out Of Love" which was played by both Hot AC and Soft AC radio stations across the country. With a review feature from Chuck Taylor at Billboard Magazine on May 17, 2008, the single found its way across a wide variety of stations in the U.S., including WKTU in New York City and KBIG Los Angeles, as well as making its way to the R&R Top 40 Indicator charts.

The founder of Monster Cable, Noel Lee, agreed to use Drey's dance hit "Why Should I Believe You" to film the first music video ever in WMV HD (720p) with 7.1 digital audio. It was filmed at Microsoft Studios in Washington, and the content was used in a nationwide, big chain store calibration video called "Monster / ISF HDTV Calibration Wizard DVD", which was also narrated by Drey.

In 2008, Drey performed in Beatstock at Jones Beach in NY and the PCN Bank Arts Center with artists such as Basshunter, The Pussycat Dolls, Chris Willis, September, and more.

In 2011, Drey released "Can't Let Go" which received airplay on reporting dance leaning stations such as C89.5 Seattle, Music Choice, WNRG 107.9 and more which made top 100 most played Dance songs of the Year. In the summer 2012, she released "Summer Night in Seattle" which became a long-standing summer theme song for the nation's longest running Billboard reporting Dance Station in the U.S., Seattle C89.5. She even beat out Jessie J when hosting the C89.5 Seattle "The Morning Showdown."

Drey has had songs appear in TV and film, licensed for such shows as America's Next Top Model, the new DVD re-pressings for shows Beverly Hills 90210 and Melrose Place, and a feature song, "Let's Go Ride It", in the motion picture Bachelor Party Vegas. Her original song "Don't Wanna Cry Anymore" was a feature song in the motion picture '‘The Big Gay Musical’'.

Jenna Drey has been a headliner performer in club venues and at Gay Pride events. Drey has been the headliner at Pride events in the U.S., including in Seattle, Washington, D.C., Chicago, Providence, Houston, Ft. Lauderdale, Phoenix, Flagstaff (2010), and Minneapolis.

== Billboard chart performance ==
Billboard chart performance
Year	Title	Chart	Peak position	Weeks on hart
2005	Killin' Me (Where Did I Go Wrong)	Dance/Mix Show Airplay	11	11
2005	Killin' Me (Where Did I Go Wrong)	Dance Club Songs	6	15
2006	Why Should I Believe You	Dance/Mix Show Airplay	24	1
2006	Why Should I Believe You	Dance Club Songs	10	14
2007	By The Way	Dance/Mix Show Airplay	4	16
2007	By The Way	Dance Club Songs	19	14

== Discography ==
=== Just Like That ===
1. "Just Like That"
2. "That's What They All Say"
3. "Why Should I Believe You"
4. "Stand in Line"
5. "Say Goodbye to Loneliness"
6. "Shadow of a Stranger"
7. "More Than This"
8. "Killin' Me (Where Did I Go Wrong?)" pop version
9. "Let's Ride Your Motorcycle"
10. "Why Should I Believe You" bagpipe mix
11. "Say Goodbye to Loneliness" dance remix
12. "Just Like That" Churko/Euro pop mix
13. "Just Like That" Stadium Sports Theme

=== One Step Further ===
1. "One Step Further"
2. "By the Way"
3. "Killin' Me (Where Did I Go Wrong?)" Rizzo radio :)
4. "We're All Alone"
5. "Don't Wanna Cry Anymore"
6. "Shadow of a Stranger"
7. "Why Should I Believe You" Harris dance
8. "All Out of Love"
9. "Impossibility"
10. "Thousand Times a Day"
11. "I Told You So"
12. "Was It Something I Said"
13. "Breaking Me"
14. "Why Should I Believe You"
15. "Why Should I Believe You" Churko bagpipe
16. "Killin' Me (Where Did I Go Wrong?)" Giuseppe D remix
17. "One Step Further" rockin' radio

=== Singles ===
- "Killin' Me (Where Did I Go Wrong)"
- "Why Should I Believe You"
- "Say Goodbye To Loneliness"
- "Just Like That"
- "More Than This"
- "By The Way"
- "Girlz Night Out"
- "All Out of Love"
- "Can't Let Go"
- "Summer Night in Seattle"
- "Making Me Love Again"
