= Linnéa Handberg Lund =

Danish musician

Linnéa Handberg
- Also known as: Papaya, Miss Papaya
- Born: Linnéa Handberg
- Genres: Eurodance, Europop
- Occupation: Singer

Linnéa Handberg Lund, professionally known as Miss Papaya, is a Danish music artist whose Eurodance albums were released by Scandinavian Records. She is best known for her song "Hero", which was released in 1998 and featured in the Dance Dance Revolution series in 1999.

== Discography ==
=== Video games ===
Miss Papaya has a total of 3 songs which appear in the Dance Dance Revolution (DDR) and StepManiaX arcade series, plus two remixes available in the DDR series. "Hero" was featured in Dance Dance Revolution 2ndMix and returned in numerous sequels, appearing in a total of eight arcade releases. With the release of Dance Dance Revolution X for the PlayStation 2 in North America, a longer edit of "Hero" is used, titled "Hero (2008 X-edit)". The arcade release of Dance Dance Revolution X2 also featured this edit of the song, which returned in subsequent releases until July 3, 2015, when an online update removed this song from the 2014 edition of DDR.

Song	Arcade game									StepManiaX availability
Song	2nd	3rd	4th	5th	X2	X3	2013	2014	StepManiaX	StepManiaX availability
"Hero"	Yes	Yes	Yes	Yes	Yes	Yes	Yes	"Hero (2008 X-edit)" was removed from this game on July 3, 2015.	Yes	May 7, 2020
"Hero (KCP Discotique Mix)"		3rdMix Plus only	Yes	Yes						
"Hero (Happy Grandale Mix)"			Yes	Yes						
"Operator"		Yes	Yes						Yes	May 29, 2021
"Pink Dinosaur"			Yes	Yes					Yes	June 17, 2020
