= Mango Groove (album) =

Studio album by Mango Groove
- Released: 11 July 1989
- Recorded: June–December 1988
- Studio: Audio Lab
- Genre: Afropop
- Length: 43:38
- Label: Tusk Music
- Producer: Chris Birkett; Alan Lazar; John Leyden

Mango Groove chronology
Mango Groove (1989)	Hometalk (1990)

Mango Groove is the self-titled debut album of Mango Groove, a South African pop fusion band whose sound is influenced by township music. Seven of the eleven songs on the album were released as singles. The album sold extremely well, breaking national sales records and maintaining a high rank in the radio charts for a year. The band dedicated the album to Mickey Vilakazi, a bandmate who died in June 1988.

Although the material won multiple awards from the South African Broadcasting Corporation, including "Best Album", the SABC censored the music video for the song "Hellfire", which had an anti-apartheid message. "Hellfire", the only song on the album written by Mickey Vilakazi, opens the album.

== Track listing ==
No.	Title	Writer(s)	Length
1.	"Hellfire"	Mickey Vilakazi	3:59
2.	"Dance Sum More"	John Leyden, Kevin Botha, Jack Lerole, B. George Lewis, Meshak Mtswala	3:15
3.	"Love Is"	John Leyden, Kevin Botha, Siphu Bhengu	3:20
4.	"Special Star"	John Leyden, Kevin Botha, Alan Ari Lazar, Siphu Bhengu, Mduduzi Magwaza	5:52
5.	"Under a Lover's Moon"	John Leyden, Kevin Botha, Claire Johnston, Mduduzi Magwaza	3:33
6.	"Pennywhistle"	Mduduzi Magwaza, Siphu Bhengu	3:19
7.	"Move Up"	John Leyden, Kevin Botha, Alan Ari Lazar, Siphu Bhengu	3:21
8.	"Two Hearts"	John Leyden, Jack Lerole, Alan Ari Lazar	3:32
9.	"Too Many Tears"	John Leyden, Kevin Botha, Alan Ari Lazar	3:49
10.	"Lalissa"	John Leyden, Siphu Bhengu	4:43
11.	"Harder"	John Leyden, Kevin Botha, Alan Ari Lazar	4:07
12.	"Dance Sum More" (remix) (included only in some CD and digital media releases)	John Leyden, Kevin Botha, Jack Lerole, B. George Lewis, Meshak Mtswala	5:50
13.	"Hellfire" (remix) (included only in some CD and digital media releases)	Mickey Vilakazi	3:54
Total length:			52:34

== Songs ==
Of the 11 songs on the album, four were previously released as singles: "Two Hearts" in 1985; "Love Is (the Hardest Part)" in 1986; and "Do You Dream of Me?" and "Move Up" in 1987. All of these were re-recorded in 1988 for the album. After the album's release, three of the new songs were also released as singles: "Hellfire", "Dance Sum More", and "Special Star".

The band made music videos for four of the singles: "Hellfire", "Dance Some More", "Special Star", and the rerecorded version of "Move Up".

=== "Special Star" ===
"Special Star" was co-written by Kevin Botha, Mango bandleader John Leyden, and bandmembers Siphu Bhengu, Alan Lazar, and Mduduzi Magwaza. They dedicated the song to the late kwela musician Spokes Mashiyane (1933–72). The song's penny whistle solo was performed by Mduduzi Magwaza, who, like Mashiyane, also played saxophone.

In France, Totem Records released the song on a 7-inch single in 1989, as the B-side to "Dance Some More". "Special Star" was released as a standalone single in 1990—in France by Totem Records, and in South Africa by EMI.

==== Music video ====
The "Special Star" music video premiered in South Africa in 1990. It was directed by a young South African man named Nic Hofmeyr, who had worked in London for three years as a camera operator for music video shoots. When he returned to South Africa in 1987 to witness the end of apartheid, he started directing music videos—including the video for Bright Blue's "Weeping"—while aspiring to become a documentary filmmaker. As with "Weeping", Hofmeyr shot the video for "Special Star" in black and white. He explains:

I submerged myself in the black-and-white aesthetic of South Africa's struggle-era photography and film. The 1950s photography of Drum magazine, films such as Lionel Rogosin's Come Back, Africa, the African Mirror newsreels, the photography of David Goldblatt, Peter Magubane, Gideon Mendel and others—all served to inspire me, as did the countless anti-apartheid documentaries I'd seen on television while living in the UK.

The video features six female dancers, plus separate choreography for six male dancers (who appear in different shots from the women). The dances were choreographed by Wendy Ramokgadi, who went on to choreograph other Mango Groove videos and concerts—including the video for "Hometalk", the title track of Mango Groove's second album.

==== Later performances ====
The Hong Kong Ballet danced to "Special Star", at a Mango Groove performance in Hong Kong in 1990. On 20 April 1992, Mango Groove performed "Special Star" in Johannesburg for the simulcast of the Freddie Mercury Tribute Concert. The main event was at Wembley Stadium in London, where Mango's performance appeared (live, via satellite) on a large projection screen. The performance was dedicated to Mercury, who died in 1991. Sometime between 1989 and 2006, a symphonic arrangement of "Special Star" was recorded by the South African National Symphony Orchestra. In a televised performance in April 2018, Claire Johnston, Craig Lucas (2017 winner of The Voice South Africa), and the Mzansi Youth Choir performed a medley of "Special Star" and "Moments Away" on Dancing with the Stars.

=== "Hellfire" ===
"Hellfire" was written by Mickey Vilakazi, who was the band's trombonist and eldest member until his death in June 1988. The song's lyrics speak of an interracial love that is misunderstood and forbidden.

The music video for "Hellfire" concerns the Group Areas Act, a racial segregation measure enacted by the apartheid government. The video begins in Alexandra Township in 1989—a time by which the government's "urban renewal plan" for Alexandra had already demolished buildings and displaced or killed many black people. An elderly black man reads a newspaper article about the backlash against the Group Areas Act; he then spots a clipping about kwela musician Spokes Mashiyane. A newspaper photo of a street scene transitions into a sepiatone flashback: Outside a Sophiatown nightclub called The Land Lady, the words "No passes" are painted on the wall. Inside, Mango Groove plays to black and white patrons.

At the end of the video, a caption explains that Sophiatown (a venerable black neighbourhood and cultural hotspot just outside of Johannesburg) was demolished in 1954 to allow for the construction of a white suburb called Triomf (the Afrikaans word for triumph). These scenes were censored by the SABC, changing the context and meaning of the rest of the video.

In South Africa, "Hellfire" was released as a 7-inch single by Tusk Music in 1989, with the 1988 recording of "Move Up" on the B-side.

=== "Move Up" ===
"Move Up" was released as a 7-inch single in October 1987, nearly two years before the album's release. It reached number one on the Capital Radio hit parade. It spent two weeks in Radio Orion's national record chart, peaking at number 27.

The band recorded a new version of the song for the album, and it was this recording that was used for the "Move Up" music video. The video was taped at Zoo Lake in Johannesburg. In the video, lead singer Claire Johnston sits at a bar as the Mango Groove brass section plays. Bandleader John Leyden walks in, and he and Johnston dance together. A surprised Leyden suddenly appears in the park at Zoo Lake, where he is chased by the brass section. As Johnston sings in different settings, boisterous bandmembers repeatedly burst into the scene.

Tusk Music issued the rerecording of "Move Up" on the flipside of the "Hellfire" single in 1989.

=== "Two Hearts" ===
Mango first released this song as a single in 1985, when the band had a different (and smaller) lineup. It was the first recording they made with Claire Johnston. When they re-recorded it in 1988 for their debut album, they used a slightly different arrangement. The back cover of the single describes the song as a "township waltz".

=== "Pennywhistle" ===
"Pennywhistle" is a kwela song composed by Mduduzi Magwaza and Siphu Bhengu; Magwaza plays the pennywhistle parts in the recording. The song was previously released as the B-side to the 1988 single "Mau Mau Eyes"; it has since been rereleased in more than a dozen compilation albums.

=== "Lalissa" ===
"Lalissa" (a misspelling of the verb lalisa) is the only song on the album whose lyrics are primarily in Zulu (or, indeed, any Bantu language). The lyrics (written by Siphu Bhengu) are soothing words sung to a baby whose mother is away. In France, Totem Records released the song as a B-side to "Dance Some More" in 1989. It has reappeared on several Mango Groove compilation albums over the years.

== Packaging ==
The album's cover art features photography by Fiona MacPherson. The band photo on the front cover includes (from left to right) bandmembers Mduduzi Magwaza (alto sax, penny whistle), Gavin Stevens (drums, percussion), George Lewis (guitar), Phumzile Ntuli (vocals), Beaulah Hashe (vocals), John Leyden (bass guitar, vocals), Claire Johnston (lead vocals), Marilyn Nokwe (vocals), Banza Kgasoane (trumpet), Alan Lazar (keyboards, piano), and Sipho Bhengu (tenor sax, vocals).

Mickey Vilakazi, the band's trombonist and author of "Hellfire", is not pictured on the cover. Vilakazi died in 1988, just days before the recording of the album began. In the liner notes of Tusk Music's CD releases of the album, there is a photo of Vilakazi taken by Chris Chapman.

Printed on the liner of (at least some of) the LP record releases is a reproduction of the first page of a passbook belonging to bandmember Mduduzi Magwaza. Passbooks were identity documents that the 1952 Pass Laws Act required Black South African people to carry. Pass laws restricted the movement of Black people throughout South Africa, and significantly affected their daily lives. Between 1916 and 1981, more than 17 million Black South Africans were arrested for violations of the Act, or of related pass laws.

== Reception ==
The album broke sales records in South Africa, and was in the top 20 of Radio Orion's national album chart for a year, peaking at number 2. This was the longest that any album had maintained such a rank in the radio station's history. (However, when Phil Collins released …But Seriously a few months later—an album that had some anti-apartheid themes—it demonstrated a similar staying power.)

The South African Broadcasting Corporation awarded Mango Groove OK TV Awards in the "Best Album" and "Best Arranger" categories; one of the singles won "Best Video". The video for "Special Star" won an award at the International Television Fair in New York.

Since its release, the album has sold more than 750,000 copies, and has gone platinum more than 25 times.

== Anniversaries ==
Mango Groove's fifth studio album, Bang the Drum (2009), was released 20 years after this, their debut album. The band continued to mark the anniversary with a tour of South Africa in 2010. Promotional materials for the tour described it as a celebration of "20 years of hits and memories, 20 years of magic".

For the 30th anniversary of the release of Mango Groove, the band performed live shows on 8 and 9 March 2019 at the Teatro at Montecasino, a theatre in Johannesburg. The second date was added after the 8 March concert sold-out a month in advance. The shows were promoted by Real Concerts, a concert promotion company founded and headed by Mango Groove's former band manager, Roddy Quin.

Marking the 35th anniversary of Mango Groove's release, SAMP Records issued a remaster of the album on "mango-coloured" vinyl in August 2024.

== Personnel ==
=== Band members ===
- Claire Johnston – lead vocals
- Beaulah Hashe – vocals
- Marilyn Nokwe – vocals
- Phumzile Ntuli – vocals
- Mduduzi Magwaza – alto saxophone, penny whistle
- Sipho Bhengu – tenor saxophone, vocals
- Banza Kgasoane – trumpet
- Alan Lazar – keyboards, piano
- George Lewis – guitar
- John Leyden – bass, vocals
- Gavin Stevens – drums, percussion

=== Guest and session musicians ===
- Alistair Coakley – additional guitar
- Jethro Butow – additional guitar
- Ian Heman – additional drums and percussion
- "Big Voice Jack" Lerole – vocals on "Dance Sum More"
- The Siyagida Gumboot Dancers – backing vocals on "Special Star"
- Nico Carstens – accordion on "Two Hearts"
- Faith Kekana – additional vocals on "Lalissa"
- The Soweto Harmonies – backing vocals on "Harder"
- Bakiti Khumalo – additional bass on "Harder"
- Isaac Mtshali – percussion on "Harder"

== See also ==
- Township music
- Resistance through culture
