= Hometalk (album) =

Studio album by Mango Groove
- Released: November 1990
- Studio: AudioLab (Johannesburg)
- Genre: Afropop
- Length: 45:43
- Label: Tusk Music
- Producer: Alan Lazar; John Leyden; Chris Birkett

Mango Groove chronology
Mango Groove (1989)	Hometalk (1990)	Another Country (1993)

Hometalk is the second album by South African Afropop fusion band Mango Groove. The album was released in November 1990 by Tusk Music. It went gold upon release in South Africa, and has since reached platinum status. The title track, "Hometalk", was released as a single, followed by "Island Boy", "Taken for a Moment", and "Moments Away". The band recorded music videos for all four singles. One song, "We Are Waiting", was released several months early, in advance of Nelson Mandela's release from prison.

Hometalk was the first South African album to receive the Ampex Golden Reel Award.

== Songs ==
The song "We Are Waiting" was released several months before the album's debut, since it was written in anticipation of Nelson Mandela's release from Victor Verster Prison. When Mandela was freed on 12 February 1990, after 27 years of imprisonment, the US news program Nightline used "We Are Waiting" as a musical score for their coverage of the event. The number of US viewers who watched the broadcast was estimated at 30 million. When the band were invited to perform at Mandela's inauguration concert, they played another selection from Hometalk: "Love Is (The Hardest Part)".

One album track, "Shoo-roop!", was not written by Mango Groove band members, but by Dolly Rathebe and Johannes Monaheng of the Elite Swingsters jazz band.

=== Singles ===
When the album was released in November 1990, the title track, "Hometalk", was released as a single, followed by "Island Boy", "Taken for a Moment", and "Moments Away".

"Island Boy" is a pop song that was issued as a CD single in France (on Carrère Records' Cent Pour Cent imprint). "Taken for a Moment" is a ballad written in memory of the anthropologist and anti-apartheid activist David Webster. Dr. Webster was assassinated in 1989 by agents of the Civil Cooperation Bureau, a state-sponsored death squad.

"Moments Away" was also a tribute of sorts. In the song, Alan Lazar plays a grand piano in which thumbtacks are attached to the hammers. The thumbtacks give the notes a "metallic timbre", but damage the piano. The band did all of this in imitation of Abdullah Ibrahim's 1974 recording of "Mannenberg", a Cape jazz song that has come to be regarded as a classic. Ibrahim had used thumbtacks when recording the song in order to evoke the sound of marabi music.

The band recorded music videos for all four singles. The dances in "Hometalk" were choreographed by Wendy Ramokgadi, who previously choreographed the video for "Special Star". The video for "Island Boy" was shot on location in Mozambique.

"Moments Away" later became the title track of Mango Groove's 2006 compilation album, Moments Away: Love Songs and Lullabies, 1990–2006. The album's notes describe "Moments Away" as the band's "biggest-selling love song".

== Production ==
Hometalk was arranged by band member Alan Lazar and bandleader John Leyden. It was produced and mixed by Alan Lazar, John Leyden, and Chris Birkett. Recording took place at AudioLab in Johannesburg, and mixing was done at Eden Studios in London. Since the album was recorded and mixed on Ampex tape, its sales figures qualified it for an Ampex Golden Reel Award, making Mango Groove the first South African band to receive this particular accolade.

== Releases ==
In South Africa, Tusk Music released Hometalk on CD, cassette, and LP record. In France, Hometalk was released on cassette (by Cent Pour Cent) and golden CD (by Totem Records) in 1991. These French releases included two previously released singles as bonus tracks: "Special Star" and "Dance Some More". The Gallo Record Company reissued the album (without bonus tracks) in a broader digital distribution in 2013. It has been marketed through Amazon Music, eMusic, iTunes, Rhapsody, and Spotify.

In 2011, Gallo reissued Hometalk with the band's 1995 album Eat a Mango on one CD. The reissue was part of the label's "Two on One Collection" CD series. Although "We Are Waiting" is the final song on other editions of Hometalk, the "Two on One Collection" lists it as the first song on Eat a Mango. (This and later editions of Eat a Mango include "We Are Waiting" as the first track, and omit the song "New World [Beneath Our Feet]".)

== Track listing ==
No.	Title	Writer(s)	Length
1.	"Tsa-oo!"	Sipho Bhengu, Alan Lazar, John Leyden	4:16
2.	"Hometalk"	Sipho Bhengu, Kevin Botha, "Big Voice Jack" Lerole, John Leyden	4:14
3.	"Do You Dream of Me?"	Sipho Bhengu, Kevin Botha, Edward Jordan, Alan Lazar, John Leyden	2:44
4.	"Moments Away"	Kevin Botha, Claire Johnston, Alan Lazar, John Leyden	5:23
5.	"Marabi Party"	Alan Lazar, John Leyden, Mduduzi Magwaza, Marilyn Nokwé	3:03
6.	"Island Boy"	Kevin Botha, Banza Kgasoane, Alan Lazar, John Leyden	4:49
7.	"Shoo-roop!"	Johannes Monaheng, Dolly Rathebe	3:49
8.	"Uzongikhulula"	Claire Johnston, Alan Lazar, "Big Voice Jack" Lerole, John Leyden, Alfred Nokwe	3:23
9.	"Trouble Tonight"	Kevin Botha, Alan Lazar, John Leyden, Mduduzi Magwaza, Marilyn Nokwé	5:36
10.	"Taken for a Moment"	Alan Lazar, Mduduzi Magwaza	3:47
11.	"We Are Waiting"	Sipho Bhengu, Alan Lazar, John Leyden, Mduduzi Magwaza	4:39
12.	"Special Star" (1991 French releases only)	Sipho Bhengu, Kevin Botha, Alan Lazar, John Leyden, Mduduzi Magwaza	5:47
13.	"Dance Some More" (1991 French releases only)	Kevin Botha, "Big Voice Jack" Lerole, B. G. Lewis, John Leyden, Meshak Mtswala	3:18
Total length:			54:32

Hometalk / Eat a Mango. The Two on One Collection. (Gallo Record Company, 2011)
No.	Title	Length
1.	"Tsa-oo!"	4:16
2.	"Hometalk"	4:14
3.	"Do You Dream of Me?"	2:44
4.	"Moments Away"	5:23
5.	"Marabi Party"	3:03
6.	"Island Boy"	4:49
7.	"Shoo-roop!"	3:49
8.	"Uzongikhulula"	3:23
9.	"Trouble Tonight"	5:36
10.	"Taken for a Moment"	3:47
11.	"We Are Waiting"	4:39
12.	"Eat a Mango"	4:02
13.	"No Problem"	2:37
14.	"The Lion Sleeps Tonight"	3:30
15.	"Right Time"	4:28
16.	"Gone Too Soon"	4:11
17.	"Only Love"	5:01
18.	"Place in My Heart"	3:48
19.	"Hong Kong"	3:44
20.	"Place in the Sun"	3:39
Total length:		1:20:43

== See also ==
- List of best-selling albums by country
