= Mango Groove: Live in Concert =

- Front cover of the DVD packaging
- Directed by: Michael Scheider
- Starring: Mango Groove
- Music by: Mango Groove
- Production company: Alphacam Africa
- Distributed by: EMI
- Release date: 4 April 2011 (South Africa)
- Running time: 110 minutes
- Country: South Africa
- Language: English

Mango Groove: Live in Concert is a concert video released by South African fusion group Mango Groove in 2011.

In addition to the 19 songs performed at the concert, the DVD includes songs, music videos, and an electronic press kit from the band's 2009 album, Bang the Drum. It also includes a digital photo montage in tribute to the Endangered Wildlife Trust, an environmental organisation in South Africa. The song "Belong" (from Bang the Drum) is the musical score for the montage. The music videos are "This Is Not a Party" and "Give It (All Day, All Night)". A third music video, for the song "Everyone's Dancing", is a collection of footage from the concert.

== Production ==
The concert was filmed on 18 September 2010 at Carnival City Casino's Big Top Arena in Boksburg, using 10 high-definition video cameras. Although Mango Groove concerts had been taped before for feature-length television specials, this was their first concert to be commercially distributed on DVD-Video. The video shoot was scheduled for July, but had to be postponed when lead singer Claire Johnston lost her voice after contracting influenza.

Wendy Ramokgadi choreographed dance routines for the band's dancers, The Mangoettes. Ramokgadi had worked with Mango Groove years earlier to choreograph concerts and music videos—such as for the songs "Hometalk" and "Special Star". The video shoot was directed by Michael Scheider, and produced by Alphacam Africa. The lighting and visuals were by the event production company Sound Stylists. The show was seated to capacity and the band performed 19 songs.

== Reception ==
A reviewer for Drum magazine praised the music and the show's sound and visuals. Anton Marshall of Channel24 called the DVD "a much-needed document of how music of one era remains critically important as a national treasure". YOU magazine rated the DVD four stars out of five, as did Drum and Channel24.

== Track list ==
Live concert
No.	Title	Length
1.	"Shoo-roop!"
2.	"Hometalk"
3.	"Move Up"
4.	"Love Is (the Hardest Part)"
5.	"This Is Not a Party"
6.	"Marabi Party"
7.	"Moment's Away"
8.	"Pretty"
9.	"Hey!"
10.	"My Blue Ocean"
11.	"Bang the Drum"
12.	"Penny Whistle"
13.	"Another Country"
14.	"Mbube (The Lion Sleeps Tonight)"
15.	"Hellfire"
16.	"Dance Some More"
17.	"Everyone's Dancing"
18.	"Special Star"
19.	"Nice to See You"

Extras
No.	Title	Description	Length
1.	"Bang the Drum EPK"	electronic press kit for the band's previous studio album
2.	"This Is Not a Party"	music video
3.	"Belong"	Endangered Wildlife Trust photo montage set to the studio recording of "Belong"
4.	"Everyone's Dancing"	concert footage set to the studio recording of "Everyone's Dancing"
5.	"Give It (All Day, All Night)"	music video

== See also ==
- Live at the Royal Albert Hall (1999) by Ladysmith Black Mambazo
