= Faces to the Sun =

Studio album by Mango Groove
- Released: 28 October 2016
- Studio: Orangotang Studios
- Genre: Afropop
- Length: 1:31:44
- Language: English; Afrikaans; Swahili; Zulu; Xhosa; Tsotsitaal
- Label: Warner Music South Africa
- Producer: Andrew Baird; John Leyden

Mango Groove chronology
Bang the Drum (2009)	Faces to the Sun (2016)

Faces to the Sun is the sixth studio album by South African Afropop band Mango Groove. Released in October 2016, Faces to the Sun is a double album with more than a dozen featured artists. The first disc comprises renditions of major South African pop songs. Lead singer Claire Johnston described the selections as "personal favourites of ours" that are about what it means to be South African. The second disc features eight original songs, plus a remix of Mango Groove's cover of "Durban Road" (a song first released by the Makhona Zonke Band in 1975).

Four songs from the album were released as singles: "Faces to the Sun" was issued as a digital single in October 2015; music videos for "From the Get Go" and "Another Country" premiered in November 2016; a music video for "Kind" followed in February 2017, and one for "Under African Skies" in July 2018.

== Production ==
Lead singer Claire Johnston conceived the album circa 2011. Several years after the release of Africa Blue, her 2004 cover album of jazz and R&B classics, Johnston was contemplating the production of a third solo album to cover "great South African songs". The idea evolved into a Mango Groove project. Around the same time, Johnston and bandleader John Leyden divorced, and Johnston's mother died. "It was a turbulent time but a lot of that energy fed into the album and made it an emotional final product," Johnston said.

The album was recorded, arranged, and produced by bandmembers Andrew Baird and John Leyden at Orangotang Studios in the Sandton suburb of Bryanston. Before emigrating to South Africa from Zimbabwe, Baird had specialised in producing gospel and inspirational music.

On 5 October 2015, the band released the first single: "Faces to the Sun". At that time, the album was to be titled Sing the Beloved Country, with a release planned for March 2016. In early October 2016, just over a year after the first single, press releases from the band and their label announced a revised release date, along with the track list and the new album title. Warner Music South Africa released the retitled double album via the iTunes Store on 28 October 2016; the CD release followed a week later, on 11 November. Photography for Faces to the Sun is by Graeme Wyllie, with graphic design by the Red Flag agency of Johannesburg.

"The Road", the final song on the album, is dedicated to the memory of Nelson Mandela, who died in 2013.

=== Artist collaborations ===
Shortly before the album's release, bandleader John Leyden commented on the musical collaborations: "We chose iconic South African artists that have been part of our own musical journey and whose amazing voices suited our interpretations of the songs, but at the same time, we also worked with a couple of new and exciting contemporary artists". One of the featured collaborators is trumpeter and house music artist Mo T (Moshe Kgasoane); he is the son of the band's longtime trumpeter, Banza Kgasoane, who died in 2015. Zolani Mahola (lead singer of Freshlyground) sings with Mango in a new recording of "Another Country", the title song of the 1993 album Another Country. It was an anthem that helped usher South Africa out of the apartheid regime and into a new government.

Other featured artists include folk singer-songwriter Vusi Mahlasela, gospel singer Rebecca Malope, pop singer Kurt Darren, country pop singer Juanita du Plessis, and pop vocal quartet Romanz.

== Reception ==
In 2017, Faces to the Sun was a South African Music Awards nominee in the "Best Adult Contemporary Album" and "Best Engineered Album" categories (the engineer was Andrew Baird). The award for "Best Adult Contemporary Album" went to Hugh Masekela's No Borders; the award for Best Engineered Album went to Arno Carstens' Aandblom 13. Other nominees in the Adult Contemporary Album category that year were Elvis Blue's Optics, Majozi's Fire, and Msaki's Zaneliza: How the Water Moves.

Journalist/blogger El Broide rated Faces to the Sun four stars out of five.

== Track listing ==
Memories & Moments
No.	Title	Original artist	Length
1.	"Durban Road" (feat. Banza Kgasoane)	Makhona Zonke Band	4:32
2.	"Another Country" (feat. Zolani Mahola)	Mango Groove	4:00
3.	"Kinders van die Wind" (feat. Juanita du Plessis)	Koos du Plessis	3:32
4.	"Mmalo we" (feat. Rebecca Malope)	Bayete and Jabu Khanyile	4:08
5.	"Under African Skies" (feat. Kurt Darren & "Big Voice Jack" Lerole)	Paul Simon	3:57
6.	"Emlanjeni" (feat. NJ Kunene)	Miriam Makeba	4:34
7.	"Great Heart"	Johnny Clegg and Savuka	5:16
8.	"Remember Me" (feat. Andrew Baird)	Lucky Dube	3:29
9.	"Meva" (feat. "Big Voice Jack" Lerole)	Spokes Mashiyane	2:05
10.	"Malaika" (feat. Vusi Mahlasela)	Fadhili William	3:40
11.	"Weeping"	Bright Blue	4:35
12.	"The Lion Sleeps Tonight" (feat. Romanz)	Solomon Linda	3:28
13.	"Meadowlands"	Nancy Jacobs and Her Sisters	2:56
14.	"Vulindlela"	Brenda Fassie	4:27
15.	"Master Jack"	Four Jacks and a Jill	2:01

Faces to the Sun: Here, Now and Forever
No.	Title	Length
1.	"From the Get Go"	3:28
2.	"Faces to the Sun"	3:42
3.	"Kind"	3:57
4.	"Chobolo" (feat. "Big Voice Jack" Lerole)	3:13
5.	"In Our Own Paradise"	4:11
6.	"Sweet Surprise"	3:02
7.	"Colour"	4:14
8.	"Durban Road (Father and Son mix)" (feat. Bra Banza Kgasoane & Mo T)	4:45
9.	"The Road" (feat. Tapiwa Mugadza)	4:32

== See also ==
- List of double albums
