= Another Country (Mango Groove album) =

Studio album by Mango Groove
- Released: 1993
- Studio: BOP Studios
- Genre: Afropop
- Length: 46:55
- Label: One World Entertainment
- Producer: Alan Lazar; John Leyden

Mango Groove chronology
Hometalk (1990)	Another Country (1993)	Eat a Mango (1995)

Another Country is the third album by South African Afropop fusion band Mango Groove. It was released in 1993, near the end of the negotiations to end apartheid in South Africa. The album was released in South Africa on cassette and CD by One World Entertainment, an imprint of Tusk Music.

Mango Groove recorded music videos for three songs from the album: "Another Country", "Nice to See You", and "Tropical Rain".

== Historical context ==
Another Country was released several months before South Africa's landmark 1994 general election, the first democratic election in the country's history. The album was the band's artistic contribution to South Africa's crossover period from the apartheid regime to a new government. The impression of Lucia Burger—a critic with Afrikaans newspaper Beeld at the time of the album's release—was that it drew the listener "away from the hurt and guilt to the dream, the promised South Africa."

The title song, "Another Country", in particular expressed an optimism about the country's future. It was written by bandmembers Alan Lazar and John Leyden. While the notes for the band's 2006 compilation album Moments Away say that the song was written as "a response to the events surrounding the Boipatong massacre", Femina magazine had previously attributed the song to the assassination of anti-apartheid political leader Chris Hani.

Stella Viljoen, an associate professor of visual studies at the University of Stellenbosch, described the song as "a hopeful, yet reserved, anthem for the new South Africa's resurrection from the ashes of apartheid", that was "embraced by many in this spirit". Radio and television stations in South Africa broadcast the song over and over. In a 2017 interview, lead singer Claire Johnston said that "Another Country" was the only Mango Groove song that was "overtly political". "We changed the hearts and minds of people in a way politicians cannot." Arthur Goldstuck of Billboard described "Another Country" as "one of the most beautiful songs to emerge from [South Africa's] transition to democracy".

Johnny Clegg and Savuka—another influential, multi-ethnic, anti-apartheid band—also released an album during South Africa's crossover period: Heat, Dust and Dreams (1993).

For their 2016 album Faces to the Sun, Mango Groove re-recorded "Another Country" with a duet between Claire Johnston and Zolani Mahola. A music video for the re-recording followed the release of the album. The video was filmed at a concert the band performed on National Women's Day in August 2016.

== Music videos ==
The band recorded music videos for three songs from the album: "Another Country", "Nice to See You", and "Tropical Rain".

=== "Tropical Rain" ===
In "Tropical Rain", which was taped in colour, the band wear various costumes as they play and dance in a tropical setting.

=== "Nice to See You" ===
The video for "Nice to See You" is in black and white. A Zulu man presents a phonograph with a twelve-inch single of "Nice to See You" to his father, and plays it. When the music begins, Johnston strolls through a mid-century town as people dance. She travels by train and car to an African music competition, which Mango Groove wins. As the winning band, Mango plays on a variety show. Shots of Johnston singing into a microphone at a radio station are interspersed with scenes of her radio listeners. The end of the video returns to the original Zulu frame narrative. More people approach as the music from the phonograph fades. The elder Zulu man praises the record, and tells his son to "let it play out".

=== "Another Country" ===
The video for "Another Country" opens on a charcoal drawing animation by William Kentridge of a barren landscape dotted with horn loudspeakers of the sort used in public address systems. Wind howls in the air, but stops when Johnston begins to sing. As she does so, she raises an arm in gesture, and a vessel of water emerges. The scene changes to an animated charcoal drawing of a city. Protestors fill the streets. On one building, images materialise of people who have been injured and killed. Later in the video, the protestors surround the towers of loudspeakers, some of which are now covered and bound. Johnston stands as a giant in a sea of protestors. With a swipe of her arm, she destroys one of the towers. The wrapping of one of the towers forms a bowl, and the protestors leave the streets. The bowl fills to overflowing with water, and the water floods the streets of the city. A radio emerges from the water, and the a stream carries away one of the loudspeakers. The scaffolding of another loudspeaker collapses, and the speaker becomes a bucket from which water flows. Johnston gestures again, and a giant bowl of water appears in the sky over a field of protestors. Their presence is replaced with a lush landscape, and the bowl overflows with water.

== Track listing ==
No.	Title	Lyrics	Music	Length
1.	"Nice to See You"	Claire Johnston, John Leyden	Alan Lazar, John Leyden, Mduduzi Magwaza	4:32
2.	"Keep On Dancing"	Claire Johnston, Banza Kgasoane, John Leyden	Alan Lazar, John Leyden	3:21
3.	"Follow My Mind"	Kevin Botha, Claire Johnston, John Leyden	Kevin Botha, Alan Lazar, John Leyden	4:41
4.	"We Don't Need a Miracle"	Claire Johnston, Alan Lazar, John Leyden	Alan Lazar, John Leyden	3:44
5.	"Shake!"		Banza Kgasoane, John Leyden, Mduduzi Magwaza	3:07
6.	"Another Country"	John Leyden	Alan Lazar, John Leyden	4:16
7.	"Kindest Part of Love"	John Leyden	Alan Lazar, John Leyden	3:20
8.	"Sometimes"	Claire Johnston, John Leyden	Alan Lazar, John Leyden	3:52
9.	"Tropical Rain"	Kevin Botha, Banza Kgasoane, Claire Johnston, John Leyden	Claire Johnston, Banza Kgasoane, John Leyden	3:49
10.	"Sweet Sorrow"	Claire Johnston, Alan Lazar	Alan Lazar	2:33
11.	"A New Kind of Love"	Claire Johnston, John Leyden	Alan Lazar, John Leyden	3:30
12.	"Love Will Find a Way"	Claire Johnston, John Leyden	Steve Cooks, Claire Johnston, John Leyden, Mauritz Lotz	3:29
13.	"Dream Softly"	Claire Johnston, John Leyden	John Leyden	2:41
Total length:				46:55

== Production ==
Another Country was recorded over the course of four months at BOP Studios, outside the city of Mafikeng. The recording engineer was Richard Mitchell, who was assisted by Alistair Glyn. The album was produced by bandmember Alan Lazar and bandleader John Leyden; the executive producer was Robert Schröder of Stave Record Productions.

== Personnel ==
=== Band members ===
- Claire Johnston - lead vocals
- Belulah Hashe - vocals
- Phumzile Ntuli - vocals
- Banza Kgasoane - trumpet
- Mduduzi Magwaza - alto saxophone, penny whistle
- Kelly Pelane - saxophone
- Alan Lazar - keyboards, piano
- Mauritz Lotz - guitar
- John Leyden - bass, vocals
- Peter Cohen - drums, percussion

== See also ==
- Heat, Dust and Dreams (1993)
- Internal resistance to apartheid
- South African Musicians' Alliance
