= Mango Groove =

South African Afropop band

- Origin: Johannesburg, Gauteng, South Africa
- Genres: Pop music; marabi; kwela; world music
- Years active: 1984–present
- Members: Andrew Baird; Beulah Hashe; Claire Johnston; Keith; John Leyden; Sydney Mavundla; Percy Mbonani; Themba Ndaba; Siziwe Ngema; Pinkie Moseme; Thomas Selmer-Olsen
- Past members: See text
- Website: mangogroove.co.za

Mango Groove is an 11-piece South African Afropop band whose music fuses pop and township music—especially marabi and kwela.

Since their foundation in 1984, the band has released six studio albums and numerous singles. Their most recent album, 2016's Faces to the Sun, was more than four years in the making.

== History ==
=== Formation ===
Mango Groove was formed in Johannesburg in 1984. Three of the four founding members—John Leyden, Andy Craggs, and Bertrand Mouton—were bandmates in a "white middle-class punk band" called Pett Frog, while they were students at the University of the Witwatersrand. In 1984 the three young men met kwela musician "Big Voice" Jack Lerole at the Gallo Records building in Johannesburg. In the late 1950s, Lerole had led a kwela band called Elias and His Zig-Zag Jive Flutes. John Leyden was enamoured with South African jazz of this era. Lerole's reputation preceded him. He and the boys from Pett Frog rehearsed together, and a new band started to take shape. The band's name was invented over dinner: a pun on the phrase "Man, go groove!".

=== Evolution ===
In Mango Groove's early days, musicians came and went as the group evolved into a cohesive whole. Leyden was the only founding member who has stayed on since the very beginning, but the full roster eventually swelled to 11 members. Alan Lazar, a composer and arranger who became the band's keyboardist, explains that a big band with diverse musical elements allows for a variety of arrangements. For most of the band's history, it has comprised four vocalists, lead and bass guitar, a brass section, drums, keyboards, and the penny whistle. (The penny whistle is the central instrument in kwela music—a Southern African style that has strongly influenced Mango Groove's sound.) Lead singer Claire Johnston's soprano is complemented by backing vocalists Beulah Hashe, Marilyn Nokwe, and Phumzile Ntuli.

Guitarist and longtime member George Lewis joined in 1984. He, John Leyden, Kevin Botha, Jack Lerole, and Simon "Mahlathini" Nkabinde co-wrote "Dance Sum More", which was the first song Mango Groove recorded. The band had not yet found their singers, and this seminal recording was fronted by Jack Lerole and the Mahotella Queens. Johnston joined when she was 17. She was receiving voice instruction from Eve Boswell at the time. Bertrand Moulton called Boswell in 1984 and asked her to refer her best female singer, and she recommended Claire Johnston. Leyden met Johnston for the first time in Rosebank, a suburb of Johannesburg. She played him some tapes of her singing, and went to see the band perform. "I was intrigued because I'd never heard anything like Mango Groove." After a month with no word from the band, Johnston received a phone call from Leyden who asked if she could rehearse for a show booked two nights later.

When Johnston graduated from secondary school, she—like Leyden, Craggs, and Moulton before her—enrolled at the University of the Witwatersrand. She completed a Bachelor of Arts degree while touring with the band. She and John Leyden married in 1999, and divorced more than a decade later.

The band's first studio recording with Claire Johnston was "Two Hearts", which they released as a single in 1985. The band at this time had seven members: John Leyden (bass guitar), Sarah Pontin (alto sax and clarinet), Banza Kgasoane (trumpet), Mickey Vilakazi (trombone), Sipho Bhengu (tenor sax), and George Lewis (guitar). On the back of the record jacket was a sales pitch introducing potential listeners to the band and their ethos. Nicholas Hauser, who wrote the copy, described "Two Hearts" as a "beatbox township waltz" that blends music of different traditions. The band's first hit came in 1987: "Move Up", which was released on 7-inch record in an edition of 4,000, reached number one on the Capital Radio hitparade.

Some of the band's other former members are drummer Peter Cohen, trumpeter Banza Kgasoane, composer/keyboardist Alan Lazar, penny whistler Kelly Petlane, keyboardist Les Blumberg, and trombonist Mickey Vilakazi. Before his stint with Mango Groove, Cohen co-founded the South African pop rock band Bright Blue; he later joined Freshlyground (est. 2003), a six-person fusion ensemble that has been compared with Mango Groove.

Alto saxophonist and clarinetist Sarah Pontin left the band in 1986. Mduduzi Magwaza eventually took her place on the alto saxophone; he also plays the penny whistle.

Alan Lazar joined on as Mango Groove's keyboardist not long after the band's formation. He co-wrote some of their first songs, including the 1985 single "Two Hearts". In the mid-1990s he started producing scores for film and television, and won a scholarship from the United States' Fulbright Foreign Student Program. After earning a Master of Fine Arts degree from the USC School of Cinema-Television in 1997, he settled in the US and continued his career in the Greater Los Angeles Area.

"Big Mickey" Vilakazi, a World War II veteran, was also an early member of the band. He was 65 when he joined; John Leyden recalled that when Vilakazi died in June 1988, it seemed for a time that the band might break up.

Mango's longtime trumpeter, Banza Kgasoane, died 9 December 2015, age 65. At the funeral service in Alexandra, Claire Johnston, John Leyden, and other musicians joined Kgasoane's son Moshe on-stage to perform a tribute to Banza. Moshe, like his father, took up the trumpet; he performs as Mo-T with the band Mi Casa. On 21 December, South Africa's Minister of Arts and Culture Nathi Mthethwa memorialised Kgasoane in a press statement issued by the Department.

=== Albums ===
Album releases
1989	Mango Groove
1990	Hometalk
1991–1992
1993	Another Country
1994
1995	Eat a Mango
1996–2008
2009	Bang the Drum
2010–2015
2016	Faces to the Sun

In July 1989, a year after Mickey Vilakazi's death, the band released their first studio album: Mango Groove. Four of the album's eleven songs had previously been released as singles: "Two Hearts" in 1985, "Love Is (the Hardest Part)" in 1986, and "Do You Dream of Me?" and "Move Up" in 1987. After the album's release, three more songs were released as singles: "Hellfire", "Dance Sum More", and "Special Star". Mango's debut album stayed in the top 20 of the Radio Orion national album chart for a year, and peaked at number 2. This was the longest that any album had maintained such a rank on Orion's chart. However, when Phil Collins released …But Seriously a few months later—an album that had some anti-apartheid themes—it demonstrated a similar staying power. (Radio Orion itself was a national FM radio station operated by the South African Broadcasting Corporation. It operated only at night, with a format that included "a wide variety of music, phone-in shows and topical discussion.")

Mango Groove was followed by Hometalk in 1990, Another Country in 1993, and Eat a Mango in 1995. In South Africa, each of these was released by Tusk Music—or by its One World Entertainment imprint. Hometalk went gold as soon as it was released in South Africa (it has since reached platinum status). After Eat a Mango, the band released several compilation album, but they did not put out another studio album until Bang the Drum in 2009. "We took a break," Claire Johnston told an interviewer shortly after Bang the Drum's release. "I wanted to do some solo things and get some of those frustrations and aspirations out of my system.… We just put Mango Groove on the back burner.… [W]e all did our own things, while still getting back together for the odd Mango Groove concert." In a 2014 interview, Johnston elaborated: "We experienced a creative lull. It happens to everyone; and I really learned a lot about myself during that time. I joined Mango Groove at such a young age, I needed to go out on my own and explore…".

During this period, Johnston released her first solo album, Fearless (2001), and a cover album called Africa Blue (2004). She also recorded the song "Together as One (Kanye Kanye)" with Jeff Maluleke in 2003; John Leyden was the producer. Johnston and Maluleke later recorded an album together: Starehe: An African Day (2006), and Leyden produced albums for other artists. Sax and penny whistle player Mduduzi "Duzi" Magwaza also released an album, Boerekwela (2005), and accompanied the Soweto String Quartet on their world tour. An impetus for Mango Groove to record together again came after the band launched their website in 2007: Fans kept asking when they would release a new album.

After Bang the Drum came the DVD Mango Groove: Live in Concert (2011), but it was not until 2016 that the band released a new studio album: Faces to the Sun, a double album that took more than four years to write, record, and produce. "We don't churn out albums," said Leyden in 2015, when Faces to the Sun was still in production. "Mango is a lot of people and we have different creative projects that we've done over the years.… [We've had] long hiatuses, but Mango has never stopped going."

Between 1989 and 2009, the band sold more than 700,000 albums in South Africa; that number eventually surpassed one million.

== Multi-ethnicity ==
For the band's first seven years, the National Party was in power, and apartheid was an official policy of the government of South Africa. For a band with white and black members, the government's policies of enforced racial segregation made accommodations, booking, and travel more difficult, if not dangerous. Sometimes when they arrived at a club to perform, they were refused entry because they were multi-ethnic. On one occasion, John Leyden (a white man) was arrested on a charge of loitering after he gave a ride home to bandmate Jack Lerole (a black man).

At the same time, the state was trying to censor and suppress the anti-establishment music scene. In the 1980s and early 1990s, near the end of the apartheid era, Mango Groove and Juluka were the only major South African music groups with both black and white band-members. In the early 1990s Mango Groove was managed by Roddy Quin (with Run-Run Artist Management), who was also the manager for Johnny Clegg of Juluka. The two bands became emblematic of the rainbow nation envisioned by Desmond Tutu and Nelson Mandela. When Mandela was released from Victor Verster Prison on 11 February 1990 after 27 years of imprisonment, the US news program Nightline used "We Are Waiting" as a musical score for the event. Band members had written the song in anticipation of Mandela's release. The number of US viewers who watched the broadcast was estimated at 30 million. In 1994 the band were invited to play for Mandela's inauguration concert, to a crowd of about 100,000 people. This was the country's first inauguration of a president elected by both black and white voters.

"We weren't overtly political," lead singer Claire Johnston said in 2017. "The only song that was was 'Another Country'. But we changed the hearts and minds of people in a way politicians cannot."

== Performances ==
=== In South Africa ===
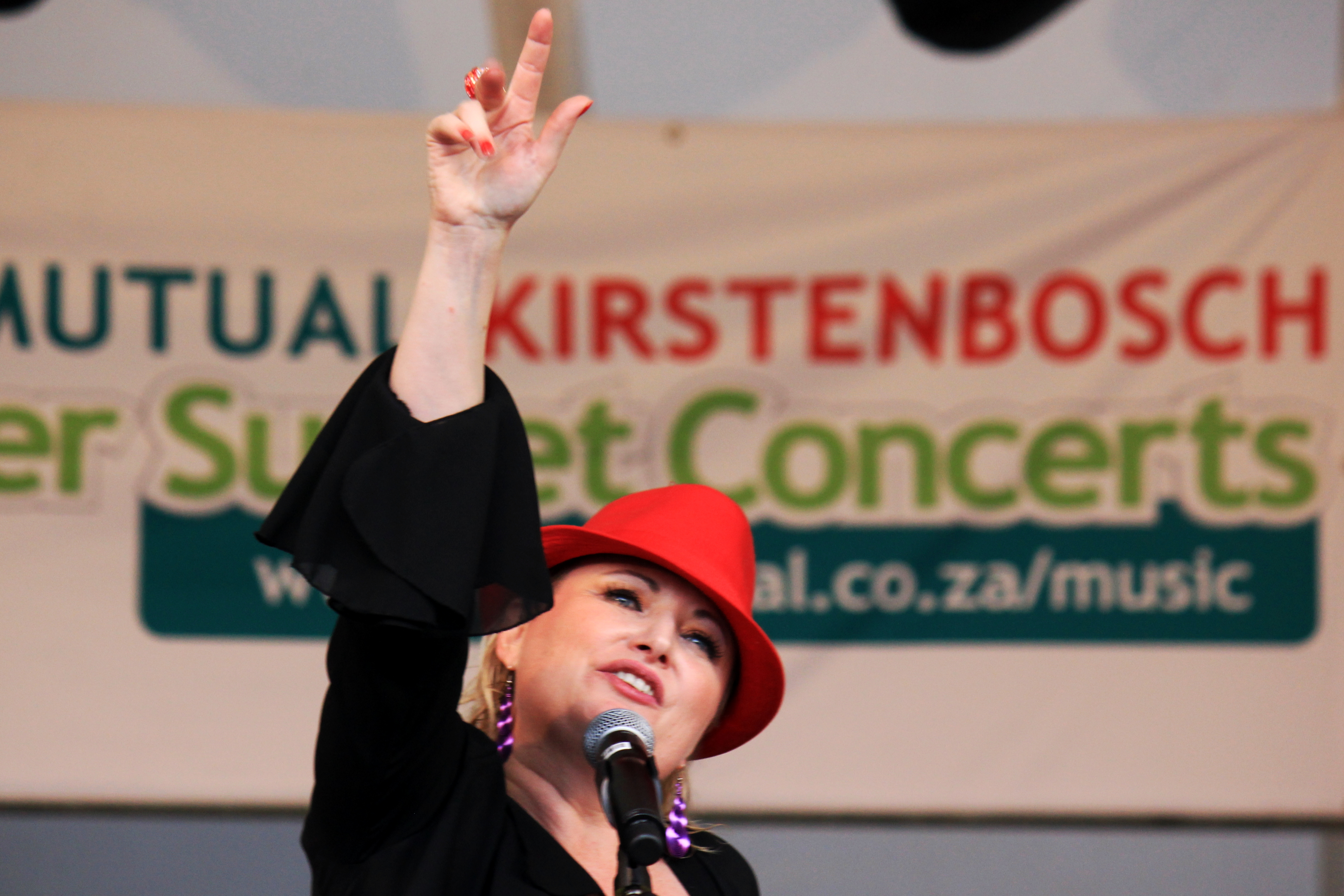
Lead singer Claire Johnston on-stage for a concert at Kirstenbosch National Botanical Garden on New Year's Day, 2012

Mango Groove have appeared at numerous venues and music festivals in their home country of South Africa. In a 2015 interview, John Leyden expressed a need to limit the number of live shows Mango Groove per year in order to avoid overexposure in a small country like South Africa. "We have never stopped performing but we are very selective of the shows we do.… The essence of Mango Groove is… the live show."

Early in their career, the band played six sold-out shows at the Sun City Superbowl at Sun City, North West, and six more at the Standard Bank Arena in Johannesburg. After the release of Hometalk in November 1990, the band and six dancers toured South Africa and the Frontline States from December 1990 to January 1991. (A concert video was also released.) Prior to the release of their third album, 1993's Another Country, they played an open-air concert with the National Symphony Orchestra of South Africa at Kloofendal Nature Reserve in Johannesburg.{cite musician in orchestra}

Mango performed at the Innibos music festival in July 2009, and released their fifth studio album, Bang the Drum, the following September. In 2010 they began a national tour of South Africa, with the possibility of stops in other parts of Africa, as well as Australia, New Zealand, and Great Britain. This was a comeback tour, as Bang the Drum was the first studio album the band had released since 1995's Eat a Mango. The Big World Party Tour, as it was called, was named from the lyrics of "Give It", a song written by John Leyden and Claire Johnston for the album:

There's a party, big world party
Everybody shake your body
Tell the world they have to come along

The tour began on 5 April 2010 in Port Elizabeth, where they gave the final musical performance of the MTN Nelson Mandela Bay Splash Festival. On 17 April they appeared at the Emmarentia Dam and Johannesburg Botanical Gardens, accompanied by supporting acts Josie Field and Wrestlerish. That same weekend they did a show at Spier Gardens in Stellenbosch.

They have since performed at the music festivals Oppikoppi (2013), Splashy Fen (2016), and Park Acoustics (2013 and 2016). On New Year's Day 2012 and 2017, they performed at the Kirstenbosch National Botanical Garden for the garden's Summer Sunset Concert series.

=== Abroad ===
When talks following the South African Border War culminated in independence for Namibia in March 1990, the band were invited to perform at Namibia's celebration concert. The event took place at Independence Stadium in Windhoek the Saturday after Namibian independence day; Namibian and South African bands played to nearly 20,000 people. In 1994 they played in Namibia again in celebration of the integration of Walvis Bay and the Penguin Islands into Namibia. (Namibia's cessation from South Africa did not originally include these territories. South Africa finally ceded them on 1 March 1994.) The Walvis Bay integration concert was the first time Mango Groove performed "Let Your Heart Speak" to a live audience. They did not play in Namibia again until 1998, when they preceded their South African tour with a show at the Windhoek Country Club.

Mango's first overseas show was an anti-racism concert in Paris, 1990—the latest in an annual series that had begun in 1985. The concerts' organisers (Julian Drey et al. of SOS-Racisme) were inspired by the concert launched by Rock Against Racism in London, 1978. At the Paris concert, Mango Groove played to an audience of 200,000 people. That same year the band toured Australia for the first time. The Australian shows were followed by a performance in Hong Kong, where the Hong Kong Ballet danced to "Special Star".

After a tour of South Africa and the Frontline States ended in January 1991, the band travelled to Great Britain for the Live in London tour. There they appeared at the Hammersmith Apollo and other Greater London venues. On 20 April 1992, they performed, via live satellite uplink from South Africa, for the Freddie Mercury Tribute Concert in London, to a television audience estimated at one billion people. In July 1992 their show at the Montreux Jazz Festival in Switzerland met with such an enthusiastic response, they came back onstage for three encores. In 1997 they played at the Celebrate Hong Kong Reunification concert that followed the Hong Kong handover ceremony. After their 1998 tour of South Africa, the band planned to tour Germany in August and, later, the US. They toured Australia in the mid-1990s, and have also performed in Canada and Zimbabwe.

A 2014 tour of Australia and New Zealand was cancelled when the tour promoter, Mzungu Promotions, lost a major source of funds (for reasons unrelated to the tour). Originally, the tour was to include six shows from 21 February to 4 March, beginning with Red Hill Auditorium in Perth; then on to the Forum Theatre in Melbourne; Bruce Mason Centre in Auckland; Big Top Sydney at Luna Park Sydney; Eatons Hill Hotel in Brisbane; and concluding at Norwood Concert Hall in Adelaide. Days before the tour was to begin, it was postponed to May and June, and supplemented with a planned stop in Dunedin. The Perth venue changed from Red Hill Auditorium to the Metro City Concert Club, and the Adelaide venue changed from the Norwood Concert Hall to HQ. Nevertheless, a press release issued in mid-May announced the cancellation of the entire tour.

On 7 March 2015, the band returned to the Hammersmith Apollo in London for the first time in more than 20 years. The opening act was South African singer-songwriter Matthew Mole. Claire Johnston had done a solo show at the Apollo in 2014, which cultivated demand for a Mango concert.

== Awards ==
The South African Broadcasting Corporation awarded Mango Groove five OKTV awards during the band's early years: The debut album, Mango Groove, won in the categories of "Best Album" and "Best Arranger"; one of the singles won "Best Video". In 1991, Hometalk won "Best Pop Album", and one of its singles won "Hit of the Year". The OKTV Awards were an annual event in which members of the South African media were the judges.

At the second annual South African Music Awards in 1996, the album Eat a Mango won a SAMA in the category "Best Adult Contemporary Performance: English". In 2017, the band's seventh studio album, Faces to the Sun, was nominated in the "Best Adult Contemporary Album" and "Best Engineered Album" categories (the engineer was bandmember Andrew Baird). The award for "Best Adult Contemporary Album" went to Hugh Masekela's No Borders; the award for Best Engineered Album went to Arno Carstens' Aandblom 13. Other nominees in the Adult Contemporary Album category that year were Elvis Blue's Optics, Majozi's Fire, and Msaki's Zaneliza: How the Water Moves.

In 2015, Buzz South Africa included "Special Star" on their list of the "100 Greatest South African Songs of All Time".

== Personnel ==
Vocals
- Claire Johnston - lead vocals
- Beulah Hashe - backing vocals
- Siziwe Ngema - backing vocals
- Pinkie Moseme - backing vocals
Brass section
- Sydney Mavundla - trumpet
- Percy Mbonani - tenor sax
- Themba Ndaba - tenor sax, penny whistle
Rhythm section
- Andrew Baird - keyboards
- John Leyden, - bass guitar
- Thomas Selmer-Olsen - guitar
- Keith - drums

=== Past members ===
- Nick Hauser - guitar
- Michael Bester - guitar
- Sipho Bhengu – tenor sax, vocals
- Peter Cohen - drums
- Andy Craggs - guitar
- Neil Ettridge - drums
- Beulah Hashe – backing vocals
- Banza Kgasoane - trumpet
- Andrew Coote - trumpet
- Alan Lazar - keyboards, piano
- Jack Lerole - penny whistle
- George Lewis – guitar
- Mauritz Lotz - guitar
- Mduduzi Magwaza – alto sax, penny whistle
- Khanyo Maphumulo – backing vocals
- Bertrand Mouton - saxophone
- Marilyn Nokwe – backing vocals
- Phumzile Ntuli – backing vocals
- Kelly Petlane - penny whistle
- Sarah Pontin - alto sax, clarinet
- Gavin Stevens – drums, percussion
- Mickey Vilakazi - trombone
- Harold Wynkwardt - keyboards

== Discography ==
=== Studio albums ===
1. Mango Groove (1989)
2. Hometalk (1990)
3. Another Country (1993)
4. Eat a Mango (1995)
5. Bang the Drum (2009)
6. Faces to the Sun (2016)

=== Compilations ===
==== Audio compilations ====
1. The Best of Mango Groove (Red Earth Music, 1995)
2. Dance Sum More… All the Hits So Far (EMI Music South Africa, 1997)
3. The Best of Mango Groove (Gallo Record Company, 2000)
4. Moments Away: Love Songs and Lullabies, 1990–2006 (Gallo Record Company, 2006)
5. The Essential (Gallo Record Company, 2008)
6. Great South African Performers: Mango Groove (Gallo Record Company, 2011)
7. Shhhhh…! Have You Heard? The Ultimate Collection, 1989–2011 (Gallo Record Company, 2011)
8. Colours of Africa: Mango Groove (Gallo Record Company, 2013)
9. The Ultimate Collection (Gallo Record Company, 2014)
10. Greatest Moments: Mango Groove (Gallo Record Company, 2015)
11. Grand Masters: Mango Groove (Gallo Record Company, 2015)
12. Essentials (Gallo Record Company, 2017)

==== Video compilations ====
1. The Ultimate Collection (Gallo Music Vision, 2002)
2. The Essential (Gallo Music Vision, 2009)

==== Audio and video compilations ====
1. Shhhhh…! Have You Heard? The Ultimate Collection, 1989–2011 (Gallo Record Company, 2011)
2. The Ultimate Collection / The Ultimate Collector's Edition (Gallo Record Company, 2014)

=== Video releases ===
1. Mango Groove: Video Biography (Atco Records, 1990)
2. Mango Groove (Ascension, 1998) [recorded in 1990]
3. Mango Groove: Live in Concert (2011)

=== Singles ===
1. "Two Hearts" (1986)
2. "Love is the Hardest Part" (1986)
3. "We Are Party" (1986)
4. "Do You Dream of Me?" (1987)
5. "Move Up" (1987)
6. "Mau Mau Eyes" (1988)
7. "Dance Sum More" (1989)
8. "Hellfire" (1989)
9. "Special Star" (1989)
10. "Too Many Tears" (1989)
11. "Pennywhistle" (1990)
12. "Hometalk" (1991)
13. "Island Boy" (1991)
14. "Moments Away" (1991)
15. "Nice to See You" (1993)
16. "Keep On Dancing" (1993)
17. "Another Country" (1993)
18. "Tropical Rain" (1993)
19. "Eat a Mango" (1995)
20. "The Lion Sleeps Tonight" (1995)
21. "New World (Beneath Our Feet)" (1995)
22. "Tom Hark" (1996)
23. "Let Your Heart Speak" (1996)
24. "Southern Sky" (2007)
25. "This Is Not a Party" (2010)
26. "Hey! (Cada Coração)" [feat. Ivete Sangalo] (2011)
27. "Faces to the Sun" (2015)
28. "From the Get Go" (2016)
29. "Kind" (2017)
30. "Under African Skies" [feat. Kurt Darren and "Big Voice Jack" Lerole] (2018)

== See also ==
- African popular music
- Freshlyground
- Soweto String Quartet
