= Eat a Mango =

Studio album by Mango Groove
- Released: 20 November 1995
- Length: 40:25
- Label: Tusk Music
- Producer: Red Earth Music Productions

Mango Groove chronology
Another Country (1993)	Eat a Mango (1995)	Bang the Drum (2009)

Eat a Mango is the fourth album by Afropop music group Mango Groove. It was released by Tusk Music in November 1995. In 1996, Eat a Mango won a SAMA in the category "Best Adult Contemporary Performance: English" at the second annual South African Music Awards. The band recorded music videos for three songs from the album: "Eat a Mango", "New World (Beneath Our Feet)", and "Right Time".

Eat a Mango was the last studio album Mango Groove released until Bang the Drum in 2009. In the interim, the band members pursued other creative projects. In a 2014 interview, lead singer Claire Johnston offered an explanation for the hiatus: "We experienced a creative lull. It happens to everyone; and I really learned a lot about myself during that time. I joined Mango Groove at such a young age, I needed to go out on my own and explore…".

== Releases ==
Cover of Fresh Records' 1995 CD release of Eat a Mango

Eat a Mango was released on CD in 1995 by Gallo Record Company (located in South Africa) and Fresh Records (located in the United Kingdom). The two releases had different visual designs. The Gallo Record Company later reissued Eat a Mango for digital distribution via Amazon Music, eMusic, iTunes, Spotify, Deezer, and other marketplaces. They reissued it on CD in 2011, in a release that also included the band's 1990 album, Hometalk. This CD reissue was part of the label's "Two on One Collection" series. Both this edition and the digital release omit the song "New World (Beneath Our Feet)", and include "We Are Waiting"—a song that originally appeared on Hometalk.

=== Launch party ===
A launch party for the album took place in Hong Kong in September 1995, shortly before the band embarked on their first Asian tour. The party was hosted by Michael Farr and his wife Lettie, as Farr was South Africa's Consul-General to Hong Kong and Macau.

== Reception ==
Drum magazine gave the album a favourable review, describing it as "a rocking collection of upbeat sounds celebrating life and love the Southern African way". The reviewer praised the album for being catchy and danceable, but added the following criticism: "The only negative thing I can say about this album is that some of the tracks sound too much like 'Dance Some More' and 'Another Country', which were big hits for the band. Perhaps they should explore some new ground."

== Track listing ==
Original version
No.	Title	Writer(s)	Length
1.	"Eat a Mango"	Claire Johnston, Don Laka, John Leyden	4:02
2.	"No Problem"	Claire Johnston, Mduduzi Magwaza	2:37
3.	"The Lion Sleeps Tonight"	Luigi Creatore, Solomon Linda, Hugo Peretti, Albert Stanton, George David Weiss	3:30
4.	"New World (Beneath Our Feet)"	Kevin Botha, Claire Johnston, Don Laka, Alan Lazar, John Leyden	5:25
5.	"Right Time"	Claire Johnston, John Leyden	4:28
6.	"Gone Too Soon" (feat. Mahlathini)	Claire Johnston, John Leyden, Mduduzi Magwaza, Simon Nkabinde	4:11
7.	"Only Love"	Claire Johnston, John Leyden	5:01
8.	"Place in My Heart"	Claire Johnston, John Leyden, Mduduzi Magwaza	3:48
9.	"Hong Kong"		3:44
10.	"Place in the Sun"	Claire Johnston, John Leyden	3:39
Total length:			40:25

Digital media reissue
No.	Title	Length
1.	"We Are Waiting"	4:40
2.	"Eat a Mango"	4:03
3.	"No Problem"	2:37
4.	"The Lion Sleeps Tonight"	3:30
5.	"Right Time"	4:29
6.	"Gone Too Soon"	4:11
7.	"Only Love"	5:02
8.	"Place in My Heart"	3:48
9.	"Hong Kong"	3:44
10.	"Place in the Sun"	3:39
Total length:		39:44

Hometalk / Eat a Mango. The Two on One Collection. (Gallo Record Company, 2011)
No.	Title	Length
1.	"Tsa-oo!"	4:16
2.	"Hometalk"	4:14
3.	"Do You Dream of Me?"	2:44
4.	"Moments Away"	5:23
5.	"Marabi Party"	3:03
6.	"Island Boy"	4:49
7.	"Shoo-roop!"	3:49
8.	"Uzongikhulula"	3:23
9.	"Trouble Tonight"	5:36
10.	"Taken for a Moment"	3:47
11.	"We Are Waiting"	4:39
12.	"Eat a Mango"	4:02
13.	"No Problem"	2:37
14.	"The Lion Sleeps Tonight"	3:30
15.	"Right Time"	4:28
16.	"Gone Too Soon"	4:11
17.	"Only Love"	5:01
18.	"Place in My Heart"	3:48
19.	"Hong Kong"	3:44
20.	"Place in the Sun"	3:39
Total length:		1:20:43
