= Nicholas John Frootko =

Retired otolaryngologist

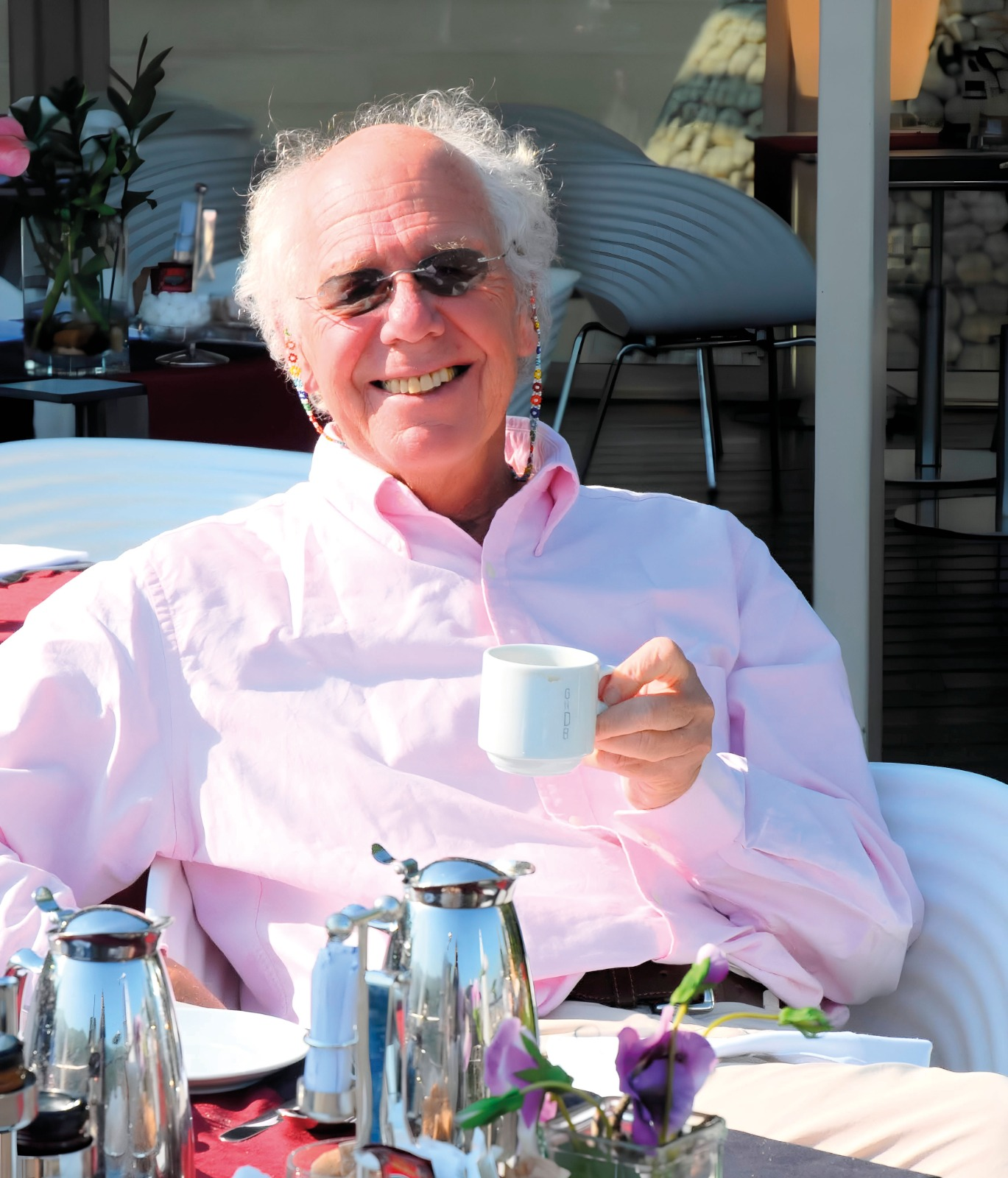
- Frootko in 2026
- Born: 12 September 1943 (age 82); Johannesburg, South Africa
- Education: MB., BCh., (Wits), M.Sc., (Oxon), F.R.C.S. (Eng).
- Occupation: Otorhinolaryngology Consultant ENT Surgeon
- Medical career
- Institutions: University of the Witwatersrand Green Templeton College, Oxford; University of Oxford; Royal College of Surgeons of England; University of Oxford Hospitals NHS Foundation Trust Whipps Cross University Hospital, London
- Sub-specialties: Otorhinolaryngology / Head and Neck Surgery

Nicholas John Frootko is a retired South African / British Otolaryngologist / Head and Neck Surgeon with a special interest and expertise in Ear Surgery.

== Biography ==
Nicholas “Nicky” John Frootko was born into a medical family in Johannesburg in 1943. He attended Hyde Park High School and qualified in Medicine at the University of the Witwatersrand, Johannesburg, in 1969. In 1970 he married his late wife Susan Lovell (1944- 2011). After completing his “housemanship's" at the Johannesburg General Teaching Hospital and a year as a Medical Officer conscripted into the South African Army, he and Susan moved to the United Kingdom and he began his formal training in Otolaryngology / Head and Neck Surgery in Oxford, Liverpool and Edinburgh.

He became a Fellow of the Royal College of Surgeons of England in 1977 and was appointed Clinical Lecturer in Otolaryngology / Head and Neck Surgery in the Nuffield Dept. of Surgery and the Dept. of Otolaryngology, University of Oxford and the Oxford University Hospitals NHS Foundation Trust.

== Surgical career and academia ==
He was a popular teacher and in 1978/79 the Oxford medical undergraduates, awarded him the Tingewick Society's, Sir William Osler Golden Stethoscope prize, considering him the outstanding teacher in the clinical medical school.

His clinical work and laboratory research. in Oxford was mainly focused on surgical techniques of middle ear reconstruction, biocompatible materials and the immunology of allograft tympanoplasty, earning him invitations to present papers at the first International Symposium on Biomaterials in Otology, Leiden, the Netherlands, April 1983, the first International Academic Conference in immunology and Immunopathology as applied to Otology and Rhinology, Utrecht, The Netherlands,1984, the International Conference on the Post Operative Evaluation in Middle Ear Surgery. Antwerp, Belgium, 1984, and other conferences.

His, mentor in the 1980s was Professor Jean Marquet, Antwerp, Belgium – the father of Tympano-meatal and tympano-ossicular allograft transplant surgery. He was appointed Consultant Otolaryngologist at London's Whipps Cross University Hospital in 1983. Here he continued his ear reconstruction procedures and was invited to write the chapter on Middle Ear Reconstruction for Scott-Brown's Otolaryngology, the definitive multivolume surgical text book used by training surgeons and specialists worldwide. His chapters appear in both the 5th edition,1987 and 6th edition, 1997.

In 1984 Frootko, working with James Triffitt (now Emeritus Professor of Bone Metabolism in Oxford), was able to demonstrate new bone formation in human demineralised allograft ossicles used to reconstruct the ossicular chain. Unfortunately this and all other reconstructive procedures using allografts were abandoned in 1987 because of the potential risk of transmission of HIV and Creutzfeldt–Jakob disease from donor material to recipient. Frootko, like other workers in the field, then turned his focus to the use of autografts and biomaterials.

Frootko also established and supervised clinical courses at Whipps Cross Hospital's Medical Education Centre in London, to prepare training surgeons for the Royal College's of Surgeons final F.R.C.S. examinations in Otorhinolanyngology/Head and Neck Surgery

The last research project that he initiated and supervised, determined the detrimental effect of type 1 and type 2 diabetes on adult hearing thresholds

== Books ==
In 2026, Frootko self-published Frootko: An Illustrated Family Story, a genealogical memoir tracing eight generations of his Lithuanian Jewish family. The book chronicles their migration from the Pale of Settlement in Imperial Russia to South Africa, the United States, and Europe between 1820 and 2024.

== Retirement ==
He retired in 2004 to Plettenberg Bay in South Africa and married Helen Mudge in 2014.
