= Special Star =

Special Star may refer to:

- Dhananjay (actor) (b. 1985), Indian actor
- "Special Star" (Mango Groove song), a single from Mango Groove's self-titled 1989 album
- "Special Star", a song on Lene Lovich's 1981 EP, New Toy
- "Special Star", a track on Dead or Alive's 1987 album, Mad, Bad, and Dangerous to Know
- "特別な星", a chapter in the ninth volume of the Japanese manga Saint Seiya: Saintia Shō
