= Golden Reel Award =

Golden Reel Award may refer to:

- Ampex Golden Reel Award, presented by Ampex Corporation to recording artists and studios for high-selling albums or singles recorded and mixed on Ampex-brand magnetic tape
- Golden Reel Award (Canada), presented by the Canadian Screen Awards (previously the Genie Awards and the Canadian Film Awards) to high-grossing Canadian films
- Golden Reel Award (Motion Picture Sound Editors), presented by the Motion Picture Sound Editors in audio post-production categories
- Golden Reel Award (National Federation of Community Broadcasters), presented by the National Federation of Community Broadcasters to public television entertainment programs
