= Hyde Park High School =

Hyde Park High School may refer to:

South Africa

- Hyde Park High School (South Africa) in Johannesburg, Gauteng

United States

- Hyde Park Academy High School, formerly called Hyde Park High School, in Chicago, Illinois
- Hyde Park High School (Massachusetts) in Hyde Park, Boston, Massachusetts
- Hyde Park Schools, a private school in Austin, Texas, which includes Hyde Park High School

== See also ==
- New Hyde Park Memorial High School in New Hyde Park, New York, US
