= Another Country =

Another Country may refer to:

== Films ==
- Another Country (1984 film), an adaptation of Mitchell's play
- Another Country (2015 film), a documentary about the intersection of Australian Aboriginal culture and modern Australian culture

== Literature ==
- Another Country (novel), 1962, by American writer James Baldwin
- Another Country (play), 1981, by English playwright Julian Mitchell

== Music ==
- Another Country (The Chieftains album), 1992
- Another Country (Mango Groove album), 1993 album by South African music group Mango Groove
  - "Another Country" (Mango Groove song), title song of the 1993 album by Mango Groove
- Another Country (Tift Merritt album), 2008
- Another Country (Cassandra Wilson album), 2012
- Another Country (Rod Stewart album), 2015
- "Another Country", a 1986 song by Redgum on their album Midnight Sun

Most of the above derive, at least indirectly, from the second stanza of I Vow to Thee, My Country, a hymn by Cecil Spring Rice, set to music by Gustav Holst.

== See also ==
- The Past is Another Country (disambiguation)
