= The Past is a Foreign Country =

The Past is a Foreign Country may refer to:

- "The past is a foreign country", the opening phrase of The Go-Between by L. P. Hartley, 1953
- The Past is a Foreign Country, a book by David Lowenthal, 1985
- "O Passado é um País Distante", a song by Sérgio Godinho (1995)
- The Past is a Foreign Country (Il passato è una terra straniera), a book by Gianrico Carofiglio, 2004
- The Past Is a Foreign Land, an Italian film of 2008, based on the Carofiglio novel
- The Past is a Foreign Country, a South Korean film of 2008

== See also ==
- The Past is Another Country (disambiguation)
- The Future is a Foreign Land
