= Bang the Drum (album) =

Studio album by Mango Groove
- Released: September 2009
- Genre: Afropop
- Length: 1:08:05
- Label: EMI Records

Mango Groove chronology
Eat a Mango (1995)	Bang the Drum (2009)	Faces to the Sun (2016)

Bang the Drum is the fifth studio album by South African Afropop band Mango Groove. Released in September 2009, it was the band's first studio album since Eat a Mango in 1995.

== Songs ==
Lead singer Claire Johnston told an interviewer that the band wanted to produce "a 'roots' album… infused with… contemporary influences". Two of the songs, she said, represent two aspects of Mango Groove: "Hey" has the "fun, pennywhistle party sound", and "Belong" (a song about being South African) shows a "more introspective side".

One album track, "My Blue Ocean", had four completely different incarnations before the band chose the version to release. Johnston described the version that made the cut as "simple, ambient, [and] heartfelt". "Before that it was tablas, choirs, rock guitars, Mongolian chants, Peter Gabriel synth samples and so on," she said.

"Lay Down Your Heart (Bagamoyo)" includes Swahili lyrics supplied by Peter Leyden, the father of bandleader John Leyden. The song alludes to the history of slavery in the Tanzanian port town of Bagamoyo. Prior to the Mango Groove version, the song had been recorded by singer Ayanda Nhlangothi for the album Rights Africa (EMI, 2000). Ayanda is the daughter of Mango Groove singer Marilyn Nokwé.

The Brazilian release of Bang the Drum, released by EMI in 2010, has one extra track: a Brazilian Portuguese version of the song "Hey!", arranged by Cássio Calazans, with vocals by Brazilian singer Ivete Sangalo. This version, called "Hey! (Cada Coração)", has lyrics by Pereira Cassio Barbosa Calazans. It was written to be an inspiring anthem, as Brasil was competing at the 2010 FIFA World Cup in South Africa that year. "Cada Coração" also appeared on the EP 2010 Brasil! (EMI, 2010), and was later included in the Mango Groove compilation album Shhhhh…! Have You Heard? The Ultimate Collection, 1989–2011 (Gallo Record Company, 2011).

=== Music videos ===
The band recorded music videos for two songs from the album: "Give It (All Day, All Night)" and "This Is Not a Party". In 2011, both videos were released on DVD in the compilation Shhhhh…! Have You Heard? The Ultimate Collector's Edition, 1989–2011, and as bonus material for Mango Groove: Live in Concert.

== Reception ==
Dave Durbach of the online magazine Mahala felt the album lacked innovation, and that the band had "played it too safe". While he found merit in some songs—such as "Utolika" and "This Is Not a Party", he observed that the sentimental ballads "My Blue Ocean" and "Lay Down your Heart" were far too similar to such fan favourites as "Moments Away" and "Another Country". He asks: "What's the point of risking a comeback if you don’t have something new to say?"

Blogger and political commentator Iain Dale found the album's familiarity to be an asset: "This album is vintage Mango Groove and they have lost nothing of their original style over the years." The German online magazine Global Music also reviewed the album favourably. Both Dale and Global Music commented on the album's high energy and danceability.

== Big World Party Tour ==
In 2010, the band followed the album's release with a national tour that began in April. They called it the Big World Party Tour; the name came from the lyrics of "Give It", a song that John Leyden and Claire Johnston wrote for the album:

There's a party, big world party
Everybody shake your body
Tell the world they have to come along

The tour began at the MTN Nelson Mandela Bay Splash Festival in Port Elizabeth. Later tour stops included the Emmarentia Dam and Johannesburg Botanical Gardens (with supporting acts Josie Field and Wrestlerish); Spier Gardens in Stellenbosch; and the Big Top Arena at Carnival City in Boksburg.

After hearing the band play the album's title track, "Bang the Drum", at Spier Gardens, News24 reporter Nadine Theron mused:

Why oh why did they not write the official 2010 FIFA World Cup anthem? Freshly Ground [sic] are also great Afro-pop. And Shakira is… hot? But a Mango Groove anthem could've finally shaken up some World Cup pride [and] reawakened the '95 spirit and rainbow nation nostalgia."

Shakira and Freshlyground performed the official song of the 2010 World Cup, "Waka Waka (This Time for Africa)", which was written by Shakira and producer John Hill.

== Track listing ==
No.	Title	Writer(s)	Length
1.	"Bang the Drum"	Claire Johnston; John Leyden; Sydney Mavundla	5:12
2.	"Pretty"	Johnston; J. Leyden; The Manhattan Brothers	3:21
3.	"Hey!"	Johnston; J. Leyden; Mduduzi Magwaza	3:29
4.	"It's OK"	Johnston; J. Leyden; Magwaza	3:31
5.	"My Blue Ocean"	Johnston; J. Leyden	4:33
6.	"Everyone's Dancing"	Johnston; J. Leyden	4:26
7.	"All About Love"	J. Leyden; Magwaza	4:11
8.	"This Is Not a Party"	Johnston; J. Leyden; Magwaza	3:54
9.	"Summer Rain"	Kevin Botha; J. Leyden; Magwaza	3:59
10.	"Utolika"	Johnston; J. Leyden; Magwaza	3:38
11.	"Give It"	Johnston; J. Leyden	4:36
12.	"A Life in One Day"	Botha; Johnston; J. Leyden	4:49
13.	"Harare"	Johnston; J. Leyden; Magwaza	4:34
14.	"Only"	Johnston; J. Leyden; Magwaza	4:25
15.	"Lay Down Your Heart (Bagamoyo)"	Botha; J. Leyden; P. J. R. Leyden; Ayanda Nhlangothi	4:48
16.	"Belong"	Claire Johnston; J. Leyden; Magwaza	4:39
17.	"Hey! (Cada Coração)" (Brazilian CD release only)	Johnston; J. Leyden; Magwaza; Cássio Calazans; Pereira Cassio Barbosa Calazans	3:44
Total length:			1:08:05
