= Bryanston High School =

Coordinates: 26.0735°S 28.0256°E

Location
- 7 Tramore Road, Bryanston; Sandton; Johannesburg, Gauteng 2021; South Africa

Information
- Type: Public
- Motto: Veritas Fidelitas Justitia (Virtue. Fidelity. Justice.)
- Religious affiliation: Christianity
- Established: 1968; 58 years ago
- School number: +27 (011) 706 6010
- Principal: Jerome Lawrence
- Staff: 100 full-time
- Grades: 8–12
- Gender: Boys & girls
- Age: 13 to 18
- Enrollment: 1,600 pupils
- Language: English
- Schedule: 07:30 – 14:00
- Campus: Urban Campus
- Campus type: Suburban
- Colours: Blue; Yellow; White
- Nickname: Bryanston
- Rivals: Fourways High School; Hyde Park High School; Rand Park High School
- Accreditation: Gauteng Department of Education
- School fees: R41 200 – R43 200 (2020)
- Feeder schools: Bryanston Primary School; Rivonia Primary School; Sandton Primary School
- Website: https://www.bryanston.com

Bryanston High School is a state-run English-medium co-educational high school in the suburb of Bryanston, Sandton, South Africa.

== Admissions ==
As a government fee-paying school in the province of Gauteng in the Republic of South Africa, Bryanston High School's admissions Grade 8 are administered by the Gauteng Department of Education through their online portal. The school requires additional information from prospective parents who can join the pre-admissions mailing lists.

Grade 9 to 11 admissions are managed directly by the school itself, and it is only under very rare circumstances that the school will accept pupils in their Matric year.

== Feeder schools ==
- Bryanston Primary School
- Bryandale Primary School
- Bryneven Primary School
- Bryanston Parallel Medium School
- Rivonia Primary Schoo

== Extracurricular activities ==
Extracurricular activities at Bryanston High School include many seasonal sports and cultural activities.

=== Summer sports ===
Summer sports include:

- Swimming
- Water polo
- Cricket
- Volleyball
- Tennis
- Track and field

=== Winter sports ===
Winter sports include:

- Athletics
- Cross country
- Hockey
- Netball
- Rugby

=== Cultural ===
Cultural activities include:

- Public speaking
- Dance
- Major Production
- Photography
- Back Stage
- Sound and Lighting

Rivals of the school include:

- Hyde Park High School
- FourwaysHigh School

== Notable alumni ==
- Janine Botbyl, Miss South Africa 1988
- Ms Cosmo, DJ, radio personality, music producer, singer
- Devlin Hope, rugby union player
- Elon Musk (transferred to Pretoria Boys High School after bullying)
- Lorna Potgieter, Miss South Africa 1984
- Diana Tilden-Davis, Miss South Africa 1991
