= Springbok Radio =

Defunct South African radio station

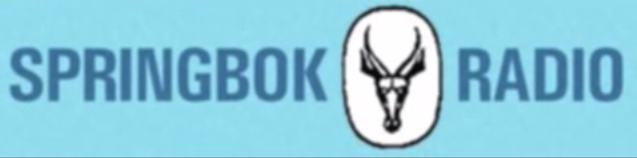
Original Springbok Radio logo

Springbok Radio (spelled Springbokradio in Afrikaans, [sprəŋbɔkˈrɑːdi.uə]) was a South African nationwide radio station that operated from 1950 to 1985.

== History ==
SABC's decision in December 1945 to develop a commercial service was constrained by postwar financial issues. After almost five years of investigation and after consulting Lord Reith of the BBC and the South African government, it decided to introduce commercial radio to supplement the SABC's public-service English and Afrikaans networks and help solve the SABC's financial problems. The SABC would build the equipment and facilities and would place them at the disposal of advertisers and their agencies at cost for productions and allow them to make use of SABC's production staff.

On 1 May 1950, the first commercial radio station in South Africa, Springbok Radio, took to the air. Bilingual in English and Afrikaans, it broadcast from the Johannesburg Centre for 113 and a half hours a week. The service proved so popular with advertisers at its launch that commercial time had been booked well in advance. The service started at 6:43 am with the music Vat Jou Goed en Trek, Ferreira. The first voice on air was that of Eric Egan, well remembered for his daily "Corny Crack" and catch phrase "I Love You".

Many drama programmes during the 1950s were imported from Australia, but as more funding became available, Springbok Radio produced almost all its programmes within South Africa through a network of independent production houses. By the end of 1950, some 30% of Springbok Radio shows were produced by South African talent or material and independent productions were sold to sponsors. At the same time, all air time had been sold or used and transmission time was extended. By the end of the 1950s, the revenue of Springbok Radio was £205,439; in 1961, it had grown to over R 2 million (£1 million), and by 1970, it had reached R 6.5 million.

By 1985, Springbok Radio was operating at a heavy loss. Stiff competition from television, despite the late arrival of the medium in 1976, saw Springbok Radio's urban listenership sharply decline, and it lost all listeners in rural areas with the handing over of its shortwave frequencies to Radio 5. Springbok Radio ceased broadcasting on 31 December 1985.

== List of programmes ==
Springbok Radio's programme schedules reflected the white, primarily English-speaking, suburban lifestyle of the period, when many women were housewives. Weekday schedules broadly comprised a breakfast session (05:00 – 08:30), women's programmes (08:30 – 14:00), Afrikaans soap operas (14:00 – 16:15), teatime chat shows (16:15 – 16:45), children's programmes (16:45–18:15), dinnertime programmes (18:15 – 19:00), the main news bulletin (19:00 – 19:15), and family shows (19:15 – 24:00). Saturday programmes were generally light - music, sitcoms, and quizzes. Sunday was more sedate - music, chat shows, requests for the armed forces (during the 1970s and 1980s), news commentary, and drama. For several years from its start in 1950, Sundays had no advertisements.

Programmes included:

=== Children's ===
- The Adventures of Jet Jungle (1973–1985) – "most amazing man of our time"; created by Brian O'Shaughnessy and sponsored for many years by the Tiger Oats Company, makers of Jungle Oats and Black Cat Peanut Butter
- The Air Adventures of Hop Harrigan (1950–1957) – from Australia
- The BP Smurf Show (1982–1985)
- The Casey Kids (1960s)
- Chappies Chipmunk Club
- Luck of the Legion (1979)
- My Pal Shep (1960s)
- Ricky Roper, Schoolboy Detective
- Superman (1950–1957) – from Australia
- Tarzan, King of the Apes (1950–1955) – from Australia
- The Twilight Ranger (1950–1953) – originally from Australia

=== Comedy/variety ===
- Father, Dear Father (1974–1985) – produced by Tom Meehan
- Friends and Neighbours – Pat Simpson and Valerie Miller-Brown (later Jim Williams and Bella Mariani) as the Duffs, David Horner and Gillian Lomberg as the Loaders; and Frank Graham
- The Goode Life (1969–1971)
- Leave It to Van der Merwe
- Life with Dexter (1967–1969) – from Australia
- Loudspeaker Show
- The Men from the Ministry (1969–1985) – "the bowler, briefcase and brolly brigade"; produced by Tom Meehan, starring John Simpson, Roger Service, Maureen Adair, Tommy Reed, Frank Graham, Tom Meehan and Pat Simpson; adapted from the BBC radio series
- The Navy Lark (1973–1985) – "the craziest crew afloat"; adapted from the BBC radio series
- Next Stop Makouvlei (1969–1972)
- The Nugget Bunkhouse Show (early 1950s) from Australia, where it was simply known as The Bunkhouse Show
- The Pip Freedman Show (1968–1985)
- Taxi (1969–1972) (1975–1978) – "the trials and tribulations of a New York taxi driver"; written and produced by Joe Stewardson; directed by David Gooden at the Sonovision Studios, Johannesburg. It starred George Korelin as Chuck Edwards, Tony Jay as Red Kowalski and Patricia Sanders as Mertyl. The series started its run on Sunday evenings in 1969 and ended in 1972. A second season of the series started in 1975 and continued until 1978 on Monday evenings. Some of the second-season episodes were written by Jay and George Korelin. During the second season, Jay briefly left the series and the role was taken over by actor Adrian Egan. Jay later returned, and the series became just as popular as what it was during the original run. Due to the success of the series, a full feature film was made in South Africa by Killarney Film Studios in 1971, starring the original stars from the radio series. The series is currently being rebroadcast on the Internet Radio Service of Springbok Radio and can be heard on Mondays.
- The Bloodhounds (1975–1976)

=== Documentary ===
- Call Back the Past (1968–1982) – devised and presented by Percy Sieff; the series was broadcast every Tuesday evening at 18h45; it is being rebroadcast at present on the Internet Radio Service of Springbok Radio and can be heard on Tuesdays
- Cameos of the Holy Land (1981–1985) – compiled and presented by David Brown

=== Drama ===
- Death Touched My Shoulder (1966–1970)
- General Motors on Safari (1965–1969) – highly acclaimed series of the African Bushveld. Most episodes were dramatised stories, although some of them were presented as true-life documentary. The series was produced by Michael McCabe and was broadcast on Friday evenings at 19h30. Sponsored throughout its run by General Motors South Africa. The series is being rebroadcast at present on the Internet Radio Service of Springbok Radio and can be heard on Tuesdays.
- High Adventure (1972–1985) – a series of dramatised adventure dramas. Replaced the series "Next Stop Makouvlei" on Tuesday evenings. The series was directed by Henry Diffenthal at the Olympia Recording Studios in Durban. Writers included Ron Evans, Denver Morgan, Norman Partington etc. The series moved to Thursday evenings in 1976 and then Saturday evenings in 1979 and ended in June 1985. Rebroadcasts of the series can be heard on the Internet Radio Service of Springbok Radio on Tuesdays.
- Medical File (1969–1973, 1975–1979)
- Scoop (1974–1977) – true stories that have made headlines; produced by Delphine Lethbridge; can currently be heard every Friday on the Internet Radio Service of Springbok Radio
- Tales of Antiquity (1975–1976) – written and produced by Kenneth Hendel; broadcast on Springbok Radio, on Saturday evenings; the original series ran for 30 minutes per episode; the series made a brief appearance on Radio South Africa in 1986 but this time running for only 15 minutes
- Tales from the Seven Seas (1974–1979) – written by Annette McKenzie and Jack Mullen and Produced by Andre Bothma; can be heard every Thursday on the Internet Radio Service of Springbok Radio
- The World of Dick Francis (1981–1984) – dramatised novels
- The World of Hammond Innes – dramatised novels

==== Courtroom/detective/police ====
- Address Unknown (1956–1970) – originally from Australia. In 1960 after the Australian run, the series was written and produced in South Africa. Many of the episodes were written in SA by Adrian Steed who also played one of the lead roles. The main role of Henry Simon was played by Stuart Brown. The series aired on Saturday evenings and was produced at the Herrick Merrill Studios in Johannesburg.
- Consider Your Verdict (1954–1985) – "it's time for you to take your place on the jury"; written and produced by Michael Silver at the CRC Studios in Johannesburg; this series started in 1954 after a run of the Australian series Famous Jury Trials; the series aired on Tuesday evenings until 1979, when it moved to Tuesday mornings; ended in June 1985
- The Epic Casebook (1957–1985) – "in which Inspector Carr investigates"; the highly successful detective series, starring Hugh Rouse as Inspector Carr. It was written and produced by Michael Silver at the CRC Studios, Johannesburg. The series aired originally on Thursday evenings at 21h30, sponsored by the Epic Oil Company of S.A. In 1977 the sponsorship ended and the series was renamed "Inspector Carr Investigates" and moved to the earlier slot of 20h30. The first actor to play Inspector Carr was Don Davis, he was replaced in 1959 by Hugh Rouse. Don returned briefly in 1964 for 14 episodes. However Hugh Rouse made this series his own. A short lived television series was made by the SABC in the early 1980s with Michael McCabe, playing the famous Inspector. The transformation from radio to television was a total disaster. The series ended in June 1985 on Springbok Radio. A local Johannesburg radio station, Radio Today 1485am, tried to revive the series in 1997, copyright issues could not be cleared up and the idea was abandoned. The series is currently being rebroadcast on the Internet Radio Service of Springbok Radio and can be heard on Thursdays.
- The Sounds of Darkness (1967–1974) – "Lee Masters, the blind detective"; written by Brian O'Shaughnessy and Louis Ife; produced by Gerrie van Wyk; starring Tony Jay as Lee Masters (1967–1972), Louis Ife as Lee Masters (1973–1974), James White, Hugh Rouse and Brian O'Shaughnessy; can be heard every Tuesday on the Internet Radio Service of Springbok Radio
- Squad Cars (1969–1985) – "they prowl the empty streets at night"; produced by Colin Fish and directed by David Gooden at the Sonovision Studios, Johannesburg; writers included Adrian Steed, Bev Peirce and Anthony Fridjhon; narrated by Hugh Rouse (1969), Adrian Steed (1969–1971) and Malcolm Gooding (1971–1985), and starring Dana Niehaus as Lieutenant Labuschagne. The series originally aired on Sunday evenings unsponsored. When the series "General Motors on Safari", which aired on Friday evenings came to an end in 1969, the series moved to the popular 19h30 slot on Fridays and remained there until 1979. It moved to the 20h30 slot in 1979 where it remained until June 1985 when the series came to an end. The series is currently being rebroadcast by the Internet Radio Service of Springbok Radio and can be heard on Fridays.
- Best Sellers (1980–1985) – "featuring great works by famous authors of today and yesterday"; originally aired Monday to Friday at 9pm.; moved to the 12h30 slot in July 1985; is currently being rebroadcast on the Internet Radio Service of Springbok Radio and can be heard on Thursdays
- Springbok 930 Dossier (1980–1985) – "from the files of interesting and fascinating people"; originally aired Monday to Friday at 21h30; it moved to the 09h30 slot in July 1985; the series is currently being rebroadcast on the Internet Radio Service of Springbok Radio and can be heard on Wednesdays
- The Stories of Sherlock Holmes (1979–1985) – starring Graham Armitage and Kerry Jordan as Sherlock Holmes and Dr. Watson; produced by Michael Silver; broadcast on Sunday evenings at 6pm; can be heard every Sunday on the Internet Radio Service of Springbok Radio

==== Espionage ====
- The Avengers (1972–1973)
- The Man They Couldn't Kill
- My Name's Adam Kane – written by Dale Cutts and produced by Margaret Heale; it aired on Springbok Radio between 1973 and 1985, and then had a short run on Radio South Africa in 1986. It starred Don McCorkindale as Adam Kane until 1979 and then Richard Cox took over the role. It aired on Saturday nights at 21h30 and in 1979 it was moved to the 12h30 slot. The series is currently being rebroadcast on the Internet Radio Service of Springbok Radio and can be heard on Wednesdays.
- Paul Vaga
- Woman in Danger (1977–1979) – written by Brian O'Shaughnessy and produced by Gerrie van Wyk

==== Soap opera ====
- Agent 0-008 en K00S (1981–1984)
- Die Banneling
- Basis Bravo (1982–1984) – written by Gerhard Venter
- Brug oor Satansvallei (1976–1978)
- Bruid vir 'n Gestorwe Man (1983–1985)
- Doelwit R.S.A. (1979–1981)
- Dr Marius Hugo
- From Crystal, With Love
- Die Geheim van Nantes (1973–1974)
- Die Indringer
- Liefdeslied (1953–1959)
- Die Mannheim Saga (1982–1983) – written by Lerina Erasmus
- My Hartjie My Liefie (1984–1985) – written by Lerina Erasmus
- Oupa Jasper (1974–1975) – written by Mike Heine; this serial was redone again in 1997, with Zach du Plessis playing Oupa Jasper; it can currently be heard every Tuesday on the Internet Radio Service of Springbok Radio
- Die Vrou van Shangetti (1981–1983)
- Wolwedans in die Skemer (1982–1983) – written by Leon van Nierop

==== Supernatural ====
- Beyond Midnight (1968–1969) – horror dramas, adapted and produced by Michael McCabe
- Call of the Sea
- The Creaking Door (1964–1969) – "the creaking door is opening, so do come in"; based on the long running American radio series The Inner Sanctum Mysteries; this series was produced by Michael Silver and for many years was sponsored by State Express 555 Cigarettes; it can currently be heard on the Internet Radio Service of Springbok Radio and is aired every Friday
- The Eleventh Hour (1963–1971) – the first 52 episodes originated from Australia; from 1964 the stories were all original and produced in South Africa; this series is currently being rebroadcast on the Internet Radio Service of Springbok Radio and can be heard on Saturdays
- Hitchcock's Half Hour (1973–1984) – adapted by Michael McCabe
- SF'68 (1968) – science fiction drama, adapted and produced in Johannesburg by Michael McCabe
- Suspense (1968–1970) (1982–1985) – original series adapted by Michael McCabe, second series from numerous writers and producers

=== Games shows/quizzes ===
- Bingo at Home (1959–1970) – hosted by John Walker and later by Douglas Laws
- Castle Lager Key Game
- Check Your Mate (1973–1985) – the family quiz game, hosted in Cape Town by Percy Sieff and Judy Henderson
- The Cold Power Hotline (1973–1978) – produced by Gerrie van Wyk
- Dial A Tune (1975–1984) – hosted by David Gresham
- Eyegene Jackpot Show (1964–1971) – hosted by Bob Courtney
- Fun with the Forces (1976–1980)
- Hundred Thousand to Go
- More Miles with Mobil
- Number Please
- Pick a Box (1955–1975) – "the money or the box?"; originally hosted by Jack Bryant and Kim Shippey; produced by National Studios, Durban; later by Bob Courtney and Peter Lotis
- Quiz Kids – hosted by Henry Howell
- Road to Fortune (1975–1976) – hosted by Donald Monat, devised by Paul Beresford and June Dixon
- Super Dooper Shopper Show (1976–1983)
- Test the Team (1954–1985) – "... the three wise men ..."
- Twenty-One - sponsored by Drive detergent and later Skip detergent
- Venture (1967–1985) - "the exciting, dangerous quiz game"; hosted by Kim Shippey and Neville Dawson

=== Greetings/requests ===
- Hospitaaltyd (1957–1979) - "daar's 'n lied en 'n glimlag vir jou ..."; aired every weekday Monday to Friday at 12h30 from 1957 to 1979; hosted by Dulcie van den Berg and produced at the CRC Studios in Johannesburg; the popular signature tune was composed by Bob Courtney and the vocals are performed by Jimmy Rayson

=== Interviews/chat shows ===
- Guess Who with All Gold – presented by Stuart Brown
- In Town Tonight (later simply Tonight)
- Springbok Spotlight
- Tea with Mr Green – presented by Leslie Green

=== Music ===
- The David Gresham Show (1985) – with a nightly pop news spot by Jani Allan
- Esmé's Music Album – Sunday night music programme, presented by Esmé Euvrard
- From the Bell Tower (1964–1985) – religious music programme hosted by Simon Swindell in Cape Town; broadcast every Sunday at noon; can currently be heard every Sunday on the Internet Radio Service of Springbok Radio
- Keep it Country (1976–1985) – hosted by Lance James; moved to Radio Orion after the closure of Springbok Radio; restarted in 1997 on Radio Today 1485AM. The programme is also aired every Friday on the Internet Radio Service of Springbok Radio
- Memories Are Made of This / Ek dink nog aan die dae (1972–1985) – musical request programme which aired at 17h00 on Sundays; hosted by Isador Davis, Evelyn Martin, Paul Beresford and Eric Cordell
- Mr Walker Wants to Play – presented by John Walker
- Musical Moneybox – Munt Uit Musiek (1973–1985)
- Pepsodent Platter Parade – pop; presented in London by Bob Holness and produced in Durban by Henry Diffenthal
- The Springbok 4:30 Special (1982–1985) – pop
- The Springbok 5:30 Special (1977–1982)
- Radio Jukebox – Radio Speelkas (1950– ?)
- Radio Record Club – pop, presented by Peter Lotis
- Springbok Radio Top 20 – pop
- The Voice of Firestone (1955–1965) – featuring the Firestone Strings, conducted by Jay Wilbur

=== News/current affairs ===
- Deadline Thursday Night – "for your edification and your delight"' later Deadline Monday Night
- Top Level
- The World at Seven P.M. (1957–1985)
- World News and Africa Survey
- Saturday Mirror - programme for the Indian community

=== Radio plays ===
- Castle Playhouse – "from the stages and studios, producers and playwrights of the world"; later Playhouse 90
- Lux Radio Theatre aka Radio Theatre (1950–1985) – "the finest in radio drama" – This was the longest-running series on Springbok Radio, which started on the very first night of Springbok Radio's opening day. Many of the episodes from the early 1950s were rebroadcasts of Australian made episodes. The series originally aired at 20h30 on Monday evenings until 1979 when the series moved to the earlier 20h00 slot. The main sponsors of the series was Lever Brothers until 1978, after which the sponsorship ended and the series was renamed "Radio Theatre". The series ended in June 1985. Certain selected episodes are being rebroadcast on the Internet Radio Service of Springbok Radio and can be heard on Mondays.
- Shell Theatre of the Air (1967–1972)
- Sunlight Theatre of the Air (1950–67)
- Tuesday Theatre (1972–1985)

=== Science fiction ===
- The Mind of Tracy Dark (1974–1978) – aired Monday to Friday at 19h15; starring Erica Rogers as Tracy Dark; written by Dennis Folbigge and recorded at the Sonovision Studios, Johannesburg; produced by David Gooden.
- No Place To Hide (1958–1970) – "the world's strangest investigator, Mark Saxon"; created by Monty Doyle; later scripts were written by Adrian Steed; the serial starred Dewar McCormack, Brian O'Shaughnessy, Paddy O'Byrne, Adrian Steed, Stuart Brown and Bruce Anderson
- Probe (1969)
- Strangers from Space (1961–1963)

=== Show business ===
- Movie-Go-Round – presented by Pierre Louw
- Springbok Spotlight – "you're right on the beam"; presented by Neville Dawson

=== Women's interest ===
- Midday Mirror – changed to Weekend Mirror in 1980; hosted by Hugh Rouse; co-hosts included Valerie Dunlop, Patricia Sanders and Clare Marshall; produced by CRC Studios, Johannesburg
- Nestlé Greets The Bride – hosted by Bob Courtney
- So Maak Mens (1957–1985) -hosted by Esme Euvrard and Jan Cronje; moved to Radio Suid-Afrika after the closure of Springbok Radio in 1985 and finally went off air in 1987
- Women's Forum – hosted by Nan Fletcher

== Springbok Radio Preservation Society of South Africa ==
Based in Johannesburg, South Africa, this was a non-profit organisation which had collected and archived all sorts of material including sound recordings and photographs related to Springbok Radio. It housed the biggest sound recording archive of the station in the world and was an internationally recognised sound archive. The Society was formed in 2002 by Frans Erasmus in Johannesburg. The archive held many original recordings on tape, reel to reel and transcription discs and also has many private off-air recordings of the station. The society was engaged in a restoration project, transferring the analogue recordings to a digital format. On 1 July 2008, this Society launched Springbok Radio Digital, a service where many of the restored programmes can be heard.

On 8 May 2012, the archives of the Society was handed over to the SABC Sound Archive.

The Springbok Radio Preservation Society website currently broadcasts an eight-hour weekday programme (Monday 06:00 to Friday 06:00) and a weekend programme (Friday 06:00 to Monday 06:00). The programming is distinct from that of the SABC's Springbok Radio Digital listed below.

== Springbok Radio Digital / Springbokradio Digitaal ==
This is a creation of the Springbok Radio Preservation Society of South Africa with assistance from the SABC, in which certain of the Society's restored programmes are streamed. The service started operating on 1 October 2008 and operates a 12-hour service from Mondays to Sundays, repeated four times. The service concentrates on presenting a selection of old time Springbok Radio programming restored and preserved at the Springbok Radio Preservation Society Archive.

Springbok Radio Digital was officially handed over to the SABC Sound Archive on 8 May 2012.

== See also ==
- Radio Orion
