= The Past is Another Country =

The Past is Another Country may refer to:

- The Past is Another Country, a 2004 album by Cadaverous Condition
- The Past is Another Country: Rhodesia 1890–1979, a 1979 book by Martin Meredith

== See also ==
- The Past is a Foreign Country (disambiguation)
- Another Country (disambiguation)
