= The Piranhas =

English ska band

- Origin: Brighton, England
- Genre: Punk
- Years active: 1977–1982
- Labels: Sire, Anagram Records
- Members: Bob Grover; Dick Slexia; Johnny Helmer; Reginald Frederick Hornsbury; Zoot Alors; Al Hambra; Gary Browne

The Piranhas were a British ska-influenced punk band from Brighton. They are best known for their cover version of the song "Tom Hark".

== Career ==
The Piranhas formed in 1977, and were originally part of the Brighton punk scene, first coming to prominence when DJ John Peel started playing their single "I Don't Want My Body" on his BBC Radio 1 programme, but achieved their biggest success with their cover version of the South African kwela song "Tom Hark". This had been an instrumental hit in 1958 for Elias & His Zig Zag Jive Flutes, and had already been covered in a ska style by Millie Small and by Georgie Fame on his 1964 EP "Rhythm & Blue-Beat". With new lyrics written by the band's frontman "Boring" Bob Grover (allegedly en route to the recording studio), and with Pete Waterman on executive production duties, it was a Top 10 hit in the UK Singles Chart in 1980. It was the first song to feature on BBC Television's pop music programme, Top of the Pops, when it returned in 1980 after being blacked out for nine weeks by industrial action. During the obviously mimed performance the drummer played using a pair of plastic fish as drumsticks.

Much later it also became a popular chant amongst British football fans. It is also popular at limited-overs cricket games, often being played when a boundary is hit, and the tune was also used in the novelty World Cup song "We're England", performed by the presenters of the radio station Talksport with adapted lyrics for the 2006 FIFA World Cup Finals. Two years later the band's version of Lou Busch's "Zambesi" – produced by Pete Collins – was a Top 20 hit in the UK Singles Chart.

Guitarist Johnny Helmer went on to become a songwriter. He is best known for writing lyrics for Marillion's second incarnation with Steve Hogarth, after the departure of original singer Fish. He also published a novel entitled Mother Tongue in 1999. As a day job, he works in marketing for a Brighton company (as of 1999).

The band gave their blessing to a song that entered the UK chart in 2005, a remake of their biggest hit entitled "Tom Hark (We Want Falmer)", recorded under the name of Seagulls Ska, featuring Brighton resident Attila the Stockbroker and members of the ska band, Too Many Crooks. This was to help raise money for a new stadium for Brighton & Hove Albion F.C. (nicknamed "The Seagulls") at Falmer. Grover received a co-writing credit for the Seagulls Ska version of the song.

In 2015 Grover and Helmer featured in the BBC's Top of the Pops: The Story of 1980 documentary. Alongside their 1980 performance and interviews with both, the film also features rare tour footage and John Peel soundbites.

In 2018 drummer Dick Slexia (real name Richard Adland), died of lung cancer.

Bob Grover died on 24 December 2024.

== Original line-up (1977–1981) ==
- Bob Grover (1956–2024) – guitarist, lead vocals, trumpeter
- Dick Slexia (real name Richard Adland; 1962–2018) – drummer
- Johnny Helmer (born 1956) – guitarist, vocals
- Reginald Frederick Hornsbury – bassist
- Zoot Alors (real name Phil Collis) – saxophonist
- Al Hambra (Alan Bines) – stand in saxophonist, who played whilst Collis recuperated from the effects of a car accident

== Discography ==
=== Studio album ===
Year	Album	Label	UK
1980	The Piranhas	Sire Records	69

=== Compilation albums ===
- Tom Hark – The Piranhas Collection (Anagram Records, 2004)
- The Complete Collection (Anagram Records, 2021)

=== Singles ===
Year	Song	UK	Certifications
1979	"Space Invaders"	—	
1979	"Coloured Music"	—	
1979	"Yap – Yap – Yap"	—	
1980	"I Don't Want My Body"	—	
1980	"Tom Hark"	6	BPI: Silver
1981	"Vi Gela Gela"	—	
1982	"Zambezi"	17	
"—" denotes releases that did not chart.
