= Tom Hark =

1950s South African kwela song

Single by Elias and His Zig-Zag Jive Flutes
- Language: Flaithaal (intro)
- B-side: "Ry-Ry"
- Released: 1956
- Recorded: August 1956
- Genre: Kwela
- Length: 2:29
- Label: Columbia
- Songwriter: Jack Lerole

"Tom Hark" is an instrumental South African kwela song from the 1950s, believed to have been composed by Jack Lerole. The song was arranged for penny whistle and first recorded by Elias and His Zig-Zag Jive Flutes – a South African band formed by pennywhistlers Jack and his brother Elias Lerole – and released in 1956. It was later released in the United Kingdom after it was used as a theme on a television series, and it reached number 2 on the UK Singles Chart in 1958.

Recording artists of various genres have covered the song, and some added original lyrics. A version by the Piranhas became a hit in 1980 in the UK, and it has been adapted into football chants.

== Elias and His Zig-Zag Jive Flutes recording ==
The song was composed by Jack Lerole around 1954, although other people also claimed to have written the song. The title, "Tom Hark", is thought to be either a misspelling or deliberate wordplay on "Tomahawk", the original title of the song. Tomahawks were carried by street children such as Jack and Elias Lerole for protection. Jack and Elias Lerole and their band were performing on the street of Johannesburg when EMI South Africa record producer Rupert Bopape (1925–2012) came across them, and offered them a recording contract. They recorded the song in 1956 with their band Elias and His Zig-Zag Jive Flutes on pennywhistles, with a satirical spoken introduction in Flaithaal. The song, however, is credited to Bopape; the right to the song is said to have been sold to Bopape by Lerole for 11 guineas, with the other members of the band paid $10 (6 guineas) each for their work. This version was released in 1956.

The tune was used as theme music for a British television series in 1958 about diamond smuggling in South Africa, The Killing Stones. It was then released as a single in the UK, and it entered the UK Singles Chart at number 30 on 25 April 1958; on 24 May it reached number 2, and held that position for four weeks. In all, the song was in the UK chart for about 14 weeks.

Elias and His Zig-Zag Jive Flutes was later renamed Alexandra Black Mambazo and they recorded a vocal version of the song.

== Early covers ==
In the UK, Ted Heath and His Music released a cover of the song soon after the release of the original in 1958. It reached No. 24 in the UK chart. In 1962, English singer Jimmy Powell released a new version of the song with original lyrics. Jamaican singer-songwriter Millie Small covered Powell's version on her 1964 album My Boy Lollipop. That same year, Mickey Finn and the Blue Men released their own instrumental cover in the UK as a 7-inch single. The next year, Georgie Fame released a different arrangement of the song (with lyrics) on his 1965 album Fame at Last. Whistling Jack Smith whistled his cover on his 1967 album Around the World with Whistling Jack. In 1969, a Jamaican band the Dynamites recorded an instrumental reggae version retitled "John Public".

In South Africa Elias Lerole re-recorded Tom Hark, as band leader of The Alexander Shamber Boys under the title "Finish". Released on HMV 10" shellac 78 number JP 806, with track number OAS 1991, together another flute jive Kgokgoma OAS 1990. The record is undated but appears to be from the early 1960s. Rupert Bopape, the producer in South African popular music of the 50s, 60s and early 70s, deprived Elias Lerole of the royalties for Tom Hark, though on this later release Lerole and Bopape were credited as co-writers.

In the 1970s, instrumental versions of the song were recorded by Jumbo Sterling's All-Stars for their 1970 album Reggae Party; by Bert Kaempfert & His Orchestra for their 1977 album Safari Swings Again; and, in the UK circa 1979, by Captain Morgan & His Merry Men for a 12-inch reggae single.

== The Piranhas version ==
"Tom Hark"

Single by the Piranhas
- Released: 1980
- Length: 2:43
- Label: Sire
- Songwriters: Jack Lerole, Robert Leslie Grover
- Producer: Peter Collins

When Brighton-based punk band the Piranhas covered the song in 1980, they used new lyrics written by their frontman, "Boring" Bob Grover. The song peaked at number 6 on the UK Singles Chart, and was the band's most successful single.

The Piranhas version was used as background music in Chris Evans' television show TFI Friday.

=== Charts ===
Chart (1980)	Peak position
Ireland (IRMA)	26
UK Singles (OCC)	6

== In football ==
The popularity of the Piranhas' version led to it being adapted by various groups of football fans as chants in Great Britain and Ireland. Manchester United followers used the song to describe Wayne Rooney as "the white Pelé" in chants.

In 2006, the song was adapted into "We're England (Tom Hark)" recorded by TalkSport Allstars before the 2006 FIFA World Cup. It reached No. 37 on the UK chart.

=== Seagulls Ska version ===
"Tom Hark (We Want Falmer!)"

Single by Seagulls Ska
- Released: January 2005
- Genre: Ska
- Length: 3:41
- Songwriters: Jack Lerole, Robert Leslie Grover, John Baine

In 2005, the temporary Brighton-based band named Seagulls Ska, made up of Brighton and Hove Albion F.C. fans, released their version titled "Tom Hark (We Want Falmer!)". It is a remake of the 1980 Piranhas hit which came to be used as an anthem at many football grounds, with new lyrics rewritten by the band's main member, Attila the Stockbroker.

The song was released in January 2005 to highlight the club's plight in building a new stadium at Falmer. Brighton had sold their previous ground, the Goldstone Ground, in 1997, and had been without a permanent home for over 7 years. On 15 January 2005, the song reached number 17 on the UK Singles Chart and remained in the chart for three weeks. The club's new stadium at Falmer eventually opened over six years after the single's release (and 14 years after Brighton left Goldstone) in July 2011.

==== Track listing ====
1. "Tom Hark (We Want Falmer!)" (Bopeape/Baine/Grover)
2. "Sussex by the Sea" (Instrumental Version) (Traditional)
3. "Sussex by the Sea" (Singalong Version) (Traditional)
4. "Roll Up for the Donkey Derby...." (Baine)

== Other versions ==
The South African band Mango Groove released a version of the song on their 1997 album Dance Sum More: All the Hits So Far. Jack Lerole, who co-founded Elias and His Zig-Zag Jive Flutes (the first band to record "Tom Hark"), was also a founding member of Mango Groove. However, he left Mango Groove several years before they recorded their cover of the song.

Other covers of "Tom Hark" can be found in such diverse albums as Freight Train (1993), a live album by British skiffle musician Chas McDevitt; The Dansan Sequence Collection, Volume 2 (1993), a Dixieland cover album by Bryan Smith & His Dixielanders; and Party Crazy (2000), a novelty album by Jive Bunny and the Mastermixers.
