= BOP Studios =

Coordinates: 25°49′0″S 25°38′17″E

BOP Studios (originally Bophuthatswana Recording Studios and also referred to as BOP or BRS) is a recording studio located in the outskirts of Mahikeng, South Africa. It was established in 1991 by the Sefalana Employee Benefits Organization, a government and employees pension fund in the Republic of Bophuthatswana. Artists who have recorded there include Laura Branigan for her album Over My Heart, Brenda Fassie, Ladysmith Black Mambazo, Miriam Makeba, Stimela, and the Soweto String Quartet. The Lion King soundtrack was also recorded and produced at the studio.

== History ==
When BOP Studios first opened, there was a lack of Western artists visiting because the South African apartheid referendum was underway.

Because BOP Studios was located in a Bantustan amidst a politically charged climate and funded by private investments, most musicians in Africa would not use it out of political conviction and most could not afford the recording costs necessary to ensure investor profit. The studios were leased in 1995 by the South African Broadcasting Corporation, which ended in 2003. The studios were reopened in 2005 after being purchased by a consortium based in the North West Province.

== Facilities ==
BOP Studios was the first recording facility to be equipped with infrasonic monitoring designed by Kinoshita. The acoustic design and building construction were specially made to produce infrasonic energy across a wide frequency spectrum, giving the space an unmatched sound. Tom Hidley and Tom Rast were responsible for the architecture of the studios, which are equipped with custom-made monitors. The consoles in each of the three control rooms are custom built, including a Neve, SSL, and Focusrite. Phil Dudderidge, Chairman of Focusrite Audio Engineering, sold BOP one of ten Focusrite consoles.

From an aerial view, BOP's layout follows that of a rhinoceros with Studio 3 being the head, and Studios 1 and 2 being the legs.

== Current status ==
Saj Chaudry is the managing director and sole shareholder of BOP Studios.

== See also ==
- Mmabatho
- Armoury Studios
