= Township music =

- Stylistic origins: South African jazz
- Cultural origins: 1920s, Johannesburg slums; 1950s, South African townships

Subgenres
- Kwela; marabi; mbaqanga

Other topics
- Kwaito; jaiva

Township music (also township jazz) is any of various music genres created by black people living in poor, racially segregated urban areas of South Africa ("townships") during the 20th century.

The principal genres of township music are mbaqanga, kwela, and marabi. Marabi evolved from jazz influence in the 1920s. Immigrants from Malawi developed the kwela sound by fusing Malawian music with marabi. Mbaqanga music is marabi's successor. It, too, is jazz-like; its roots are in marabi, American jazz, and traditional Zulu music.

== History ==
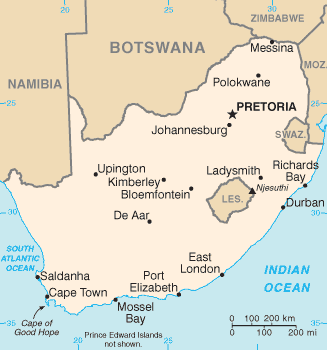
Map of South Africa

The origins of township music in South Africa began from the formation of townships, which are urban residential areas where Africans were authorized to rent houses built by the government during the 1950s. Binns and Nel state in their article that townships were the poor, black residential areas created under apartheid, explicitly revealing that these townships were not for the wealthy Westerners living in South Africa, but for the lower class of South Africa. According to Ballantine, legislation was passed during the 1950s to further consolidate the apartheid state, and violent methods of implementation also assisted this along. In fact, the most serious legislation that was passed for urban black music was the Group Areas Act of 1950, which separated all racially mixed neighborhoods by removing black communities and relocating them on the peripheries into townships. Williams confirms this relocation by describing them as similar to African American ghettos and illustrates the emotion of musicians within the townships as a lack of power, which resulted in the musicians' need to explore alternative music paths. To those who tried to suppress the lower-class Africans, jazz aspired to (among other things) musical and social equality, which was viewed as a form of rebellion during the time, hence its suppression. According to Ballantine, "the white and racist South African state" was forming an ideology and program for separating and turning black South Africans against one another.

== Different styles of township music ==
=== Marabi ===
Marabi is seen as the very first form of township music that evolved from makwaya in the late 1890s and arose between the 1920s and 1940s in the Johannesburg slumyards of South Africa. Marabi was said to be influenced by not only the social and economic conditions of working-class life, but was also influenced by a variety of sources, assimilating a large amount of performance tradition into one main style of music. Marabi was commonly considered by non-lower-class people as a rebellious style of music in its time, being associated with illegality, police raids, sex, and a desperately impoverished working-class. The term marabi appears to have a murky origin; despite this, Coplan sheds light onto possibilities, tracing the meaning, “to fly around” (which apparently describes the styles of marabi dancers) and citing the Mabille and Dieterlen’s Sotho dictionary, which defines marabi as slang for “‘lawless person; gangster’”. Also, as Robinson references the Johannesburg 1936 Empire Exhibition, marabi music was not allowed to be a part of the show, indicating the selective enthusiasm of white audiences for contemporary African performance. Marabi was easy to criticize because it reflected the dangers, dynamics and hardships of urban life in slum-yards along with the fact that it was associated with a heavy drinking culture as well. Because this music originated in the urban townships, this form of township music was frowned upon because of the candor reflected in its lyrics. Common instruments found in marabi style music include the guitar, piano, brass instruments, and organs; vocalists were also common for marabi music. According to Coplan, Marabi lyrics are considered rather loose in that participants were free to make up lyrics to suit the melody as they wished and also were well-known for being an expression of political protest at the time. Other analyses, aside from Coplan’s, regarding Marabi lyrics appear to be lacking within this field, which could be attributed to the obscurity of this subject as well as the age of this style of township music.

=== Kwela ===
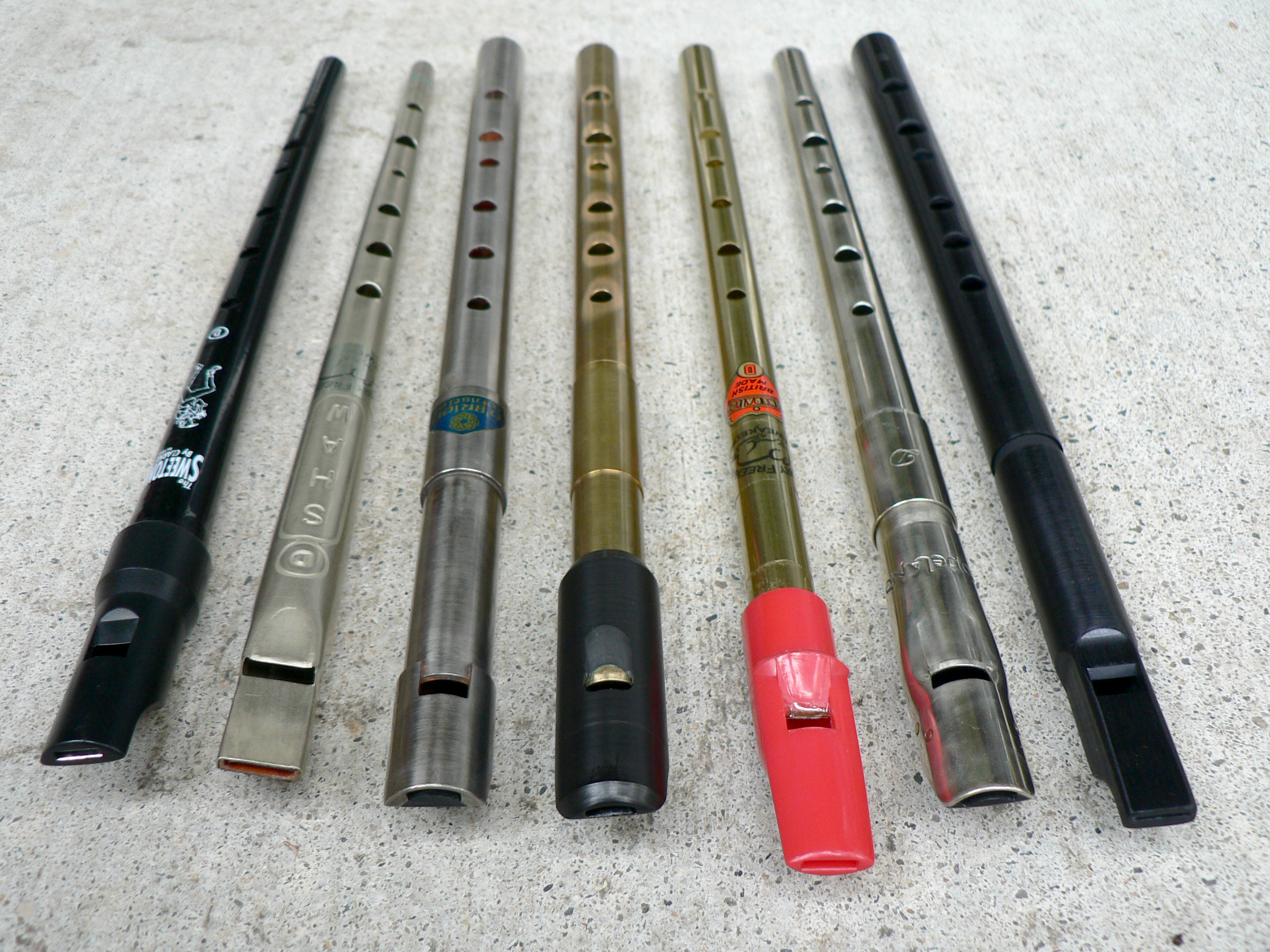
Penny whistles or tin whistles

Kwela is another sub-style under the umbrella of township music that is composed of traditional, marabi and American sing-jazz elements; it is also characterized as urban African penny whistle music of the 1950s, arising slightly after marabi music and popularized in Johannesburg, much like marabi. Coplan states that this particular style makes use of a unique combination of instruments including the string bass, the guitar, drums, and several penny whistles to construct the strong repetitive melodic line. Kwela was at first produced by the children in “black slums in creative imitation of their favorite jazzmen”. Coplan also states that the penny whistles were overlooked by overseas audiences and were still considered to be a child’s instrument. However, Coplan implies that it may not have been met with such friendly ears from everyone, but urban Africans managed to look upon kwela as an authentic expression of their urban culture rather than an indolent pastime of juvenile delinquents. Kwela was even regarded as the new, close-harmony township style based on marabi or on the songs of migrant workers. Much like marabi, kwela became popular despite the adversities that it faced. Along with the music, young urban Africans also participated in dancing to kwela music, which entailed a sexually suggestive form of jive dancing where dancers shouted the word “kwela” periodically. The meaning of the word kwela is actually Zulu for “‘climb on’ or ‘get up,’” which is indicative for others to join the upbeat nature of the music. This particular style of music turned out to be quite profitable to the city of Johannesburg, its city of birth, in that it could compete with imported music and also was well commercialized by studios in Johannesburg.

=== Mbaqanga ===
Mbaqanga is the Zulu name for a traditional steamed bread made from maize. This word also came to refer to the commercial South African jazz of the 1950s, which blended marabi and kwela with elements of American jazz.

According to Coplan, mbaqanga groups are mainly multi-ethnic, which could be attributed to the blending varieties of music in this specific style. It is the continuation of the marabi and kwela styles, coupled with its own freshness, analogous to its new place in African music history. Coplan also appears to be one of only published authorities on this topic, which is evident in the lack of contribution from other sources. Mbaqanga appears to be relatively unexplored in its field of discourse, which can be attributed to the general obscurity of the township music genre, along with the styles within it. Vocalists, in mbaqanga, are considered the core unit of all the performances, while instrumentalists depend on the demands of the recordings or live shows. Although the instruments are not always constant, some of the instruments that are used include electric guitars, saxophones, violins, accordions, and drums; some of these more recently developed instruments were implemented later in mbaqanga in the 1960s. Mbaqanga shows are characterized by several different segments, beginning with a more traditional form of music, dance and costume and transitioning to a more contemporary and Westernized form. A specific opening for the typical mbaqanga number is provided by Coplan in that the songs appear to begin with a lead guitar introduction, followed by the bass melody pattern based on the F-C-G7-C formula played over a bouncing 8/8 township rhythm. In essence, mbaqanga is distinguishable by its brutish rhythm and syncretic melodic style that is combined with the traditional style of marabi. The lyrical study of mbaqanga also appears to be relatively unstudied except for Coplan’s analysis, which, according to him, consists of short couplets.

== Historiography ==
Although township music is still quite under the radar in terms of being well-researched, there is still a myriad of information to be uncovered for this unique and historical music genre. The only major books published on the genre include Coplan’s In Township Tonight!, published in 1985, and Ballantine’s Marabi Nights, which was published in 1993. Other sources of information only seem to be articles that mention township music simply in passing, without truly focusing on the characteristics and the nature of the music. Evidently, township music is still quite a new subject of study in the music field, along with many other genres, such as African drumming and mustache rock. Through the study of township music, the true background and nature was revealed for this specific genre, which can be applied to music genres just as hidden from view as township music. Marabi appears to be the most well-researched style, while kwela seems to be researched a little less, and mbaqanga even less. Perhaps the more recent the music, the more difficult it is to characterize and classify, since this appears to be the trend in many cases.

== Artists ==
A wide range of artists exist within township music. Some popular artists include.

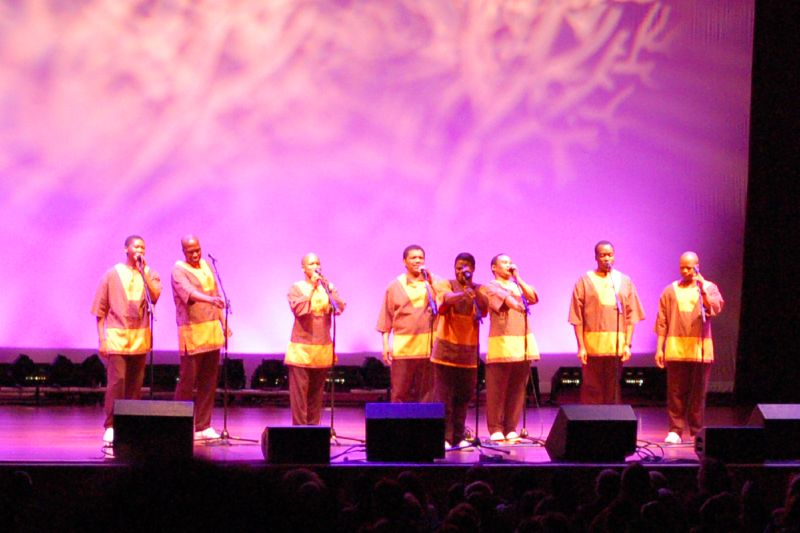
Ladysmith Black Mambazo

- Ladysmith Black Mambazo - This group was the 2009 Grammy Winner for Traditional World Music CD. Ladysmith Black Mambazo was first introduced by Paul Simon on his 1986 record Graceland
- Mahlathini
- Mango Groove
- Mbongeni Ngema - Mbongeni Ngema was the main creative force behind the Broadway musical "Sarafina," which was later made into a movie with Whoopi Goldberg.
- Mzikayifani Buthelezi - Buthelezi's music powerfully uses accordion, violin and guitar. Male lead and female chorus vocals sing call-and-response lyrics are also common of this artist.
- The Boyoyo Boys
- Hugh Masekela
