= Elias and His Zig-Zag Jive Flutes =

South African Band

- Also known as: Alexandra Black Mambazo; The Alex Shamba Boys
- Origin: Johannesburg
- Genres: Kwela
- Label: EMI South Africa
- Members: Elias Lerole; Jack Lerole; Zeph Nkabinde; David Ramosa

Elias and His Zig-Zag Jive Flutes was a kwela band, formed in the mid-1950s by brothers Elias and Jack Lerole, along with David Ramosa and Zeph Nkabinde. The four young men played on the streets of Alexandra, a township in Johannesburg, South Africa. In the early days they called themselves the Alex Shamba Boys. Jack Lerole was only in his early teens when he and Elias started playing penny whistle. Ramosa and Nkabinde joined them, and they developed a unique sound: Unlike earlier kwela groups, they incorporated guitar and vocal harmony. The "jive flute" in the name Elias and His Zig-Zag Jive Flutes is the penny whistle.

In 1956, the four were signed to EMI South Africa by the label's "black music" record producer, Rupert Bopape. One of the tunes they recorded was "Tom Hark". Columbia Records issued the song as a 7-inch single, and it was particularly well received in the United Kingdom. Worldwide, the single sold an estimated three million copies. The band did not profit from these sales, however, and in South Africa the song was only modestly successful. The members of the band earned only $10 each for the number, whilst the composer, Aaron Lerole (another of the brothers) earned $15, and saw the songwriting honours being credited to Bopape. In New Zealand Tom Hark went to number one on the Lever Hit Parade.

The group began playing dance halls around Johannesburg under a new name, Alexandra Black Mambazo. They developed vocal as well as instrumental routines, and Lerole began singing in a deep, rasping voice. This larynx-damaging vocal style became known as groaning. Zeph Nkabinde also adopted the style, but it was his younger brother Simon "Mahlathini" Nkabinde who became the more well-known groaner.

Chris du Plessis's documentary film The Whistlers revived popular interest in kwela in the 1990s. In 1996, some of the members of Alexandra Black Mambazo formed a new band called Shukuma Mambazo.

== See also ==
- Spokes Mashiyane
