= South African Musicians' Alliance =

- Abbreviation: SAMA
- Region served: South Africa

The South African Musicians' Alliance (SAMA) is a union, artist collective, and resistance movement formed by musicians in South Africa who opposed the censorship and suppression of the apartheid regime. The alliance was formed sometime before 1983. SAMA musicians flouted the government's imposed racial segregation and restrictions on music content. Three of SAMA's priorities were freedom of speech, freedom of movement, and freedom of association.

One prominent spokesperson of the organisation was pianist Rashid Lanie.

== See also ==
- Internal resistance to apartheid
