= Ampex Golden Reel Award =

International music award

- Awarded for: Gold records recorded and mixed on Ampex magnetic tape
- Sponsored by: Ampex Corporation

The Ampex Golden Reel Award was an international music award for studio albums and singles that were recorded and mixed entirely on Ampex audio tape, and which subsequently sold enough units to achieve gold record status in their country of origin. In the United States (where Ampex is headquartered), gold record status requires sales of 500,000 units, as verified by the Recording Industry Association of America.

== Awards and recipients ==
When an album or single won the award, the Ampex Corporation gave one Golden Reel commemorative plaque to the musical group/artist, and another to the recording studio. Ampex also made a donation to a charity chosen by the group or artist who received the award. They presented the first Golden Reel in 1977, and the 500th in 1986. During that period, the amount of each donation was US$1,000. When the 1977 film soundtrack Saturday Night Fever won the Bee Gees their third Golden Reel Award, the band chose to give the money to the Bertha Abbess Children's Center. When Ampex awarded the 250th Golden Reel to US rock band Journey for their 1981 album Escape, the band's chosen charity was the T. J. Martell Leukemia Foundation. The 500th musical act to receive the award was Kool & the Gang, for their 1984 album Emergency.

Some other award recipients from the United States were Madonna, Jon Bon Jovi, ZZ Top, Stevie Wonder, Donna Summer, Kiss, Alabama, Crystal Gayle, Atlanta Rhythm Section, Evelyn "Champagne" King, Roberta Flack, Maze, Con Funk Shun, Instant Funk, The Isley Brothers, Kansas, Grover Washington Jr., and Midnight Star.

A few of the recipients from other countries were ABBA in Sweden; Duran Duran, Iron Maiden, and Phil Collins in the UK; Mylène Farmer in France; AC/DC in Australia; Crvena Jabuka in Yugoslavia; Alla Pugacheva in the USSR; Charles D. Lewis in Barbados; Mango Groove in South Africa; and Pink Lady in Japan.

Only one gospel music album ever qualified for the award: Cristy Lane's One Day at a Time (1981), which had a surge in sales as a result of a telemarketing campaign orchestrated by her husband in 1986.

== See also ==
- Music industry
- Music recording certification
