= Jack Lerole =

Aaron Jack Lerole
- Also known as: Big Voice Jack
- Origin: Johannesburg
- Died: 12 March 2003 Soweto, Johannesburg, South Africa
- Genres: Kwela
- Occupation: Musician
- Instruments: Penny whistle, voice
- Label: EMI South Africa

Aaron "Big Voice Jack" Lerole (c. 1940 – 12 March 2003) was a South African singer and penny whistle player. Lerole was a leading performer in the kwela music of 1950s South Africa. Lerole was the bandleader of Elias and His Zig-Zag Jive Flutes, who had an international hit record in 1958 with "Tom Hark". He co-founded the fusion band Mango Groove in 1984, and later collaborated with Dave Matthews Band, a rock band from the United States.

== Biography ==
Lerole grew up in the Alexandra township near Johannesburg, and in his early teens play penny whistle on the street with his brother Elias. David Ramosa and Zeph Nkabinde started playing with them, and to defend themselves from street gang attacks they carried tomahawks.

Jack Lerole wrote "Tom Hark", although the producer of the song Earnest Bopape claimed the credit and royalty, and Lerole was only paid $15 for the song. The song was first released in 1956, and became popular in South Africa. The tune of "Tom Hark" (which some think was based on a 1927 melody by Herbert Farjeon for "I've danced with a man, who's danced with a girl, who's danced with the Prince of Wales", but the melody is significantly different) was then picked up in the UK and used as the theme music for a television program called The Killing Stones. It was released as a single in the UK, and rose to number two in the UK Singles Chart in April 1958, eventually selling an estimated three million copies worldwide. It was subsequently covered by various artists including Millie Small in 1964, Georgie Fame and the Blue Flames (also in 1964), and The Piranhas in 1980. In 2009, Lerole's version of the tune was used for the opening credits to Stewart Lee's Comedy Vehicle. The song is also a popular fanfare for English football clubs. Although it introduced South African township music to an international audience, "Tom Hark" was only modestly popular within South Africa, and the musicians received no remuneration from its success.

In 1963 Lerole left the group, and started recording solo as "Big Voice Jack". His breakthrough as a solo performer was the single "Blues Ngaphansi", which made him a national star. As the mbaqanga style developed, he took up the saxophone in place of the penny whistle, and his popularity was overtaken by younger singers. He continued to record, however, and produced such hits as "Cherry Beat", "Big Voice Jack", "Tully La Fluter" and "Bongo Twang Jive". He flitted from company to company, rejoining his old producer Rupert Bopape now at Gallo Africa's Mavuthela Music Company along the way (for two years – 1966 to 1968). His music career revived in the 1970s, and he toured in a leading role with several South African musical productions. In 1984, he co-founded the group Mango Groove.

In the early 1990s, South African-born producer Chris du Plessis made a documentary film, The Whistlers, about the music. Subsequently, the original members of Alex Black Mambazo reunited to perform in clubs. Brad Holmes, owner of the Bassline club, became their manager, and in 1997 introduced them to South African-born rock star Dave Matthews when he toured the country with his band. Matthews invited Lerole to play at Foxboro Stadium and Giants Stadium during the Dave Matthews Band Summer Tour of 1998. Upon his return, Lerole and his band recorded the album Colours and Moods (1998) at the Bassline. Later that year, director Johnathan Dorfman released his documentary Back to Alexandra, which chronicles Lerole's US tour with Dave Matthews Band, and his return to South Africa.

Lerole died in Soweto of throat cancer in 2003. At the 2004 South African Music Awards, he was posthumously honoured with a lifetime achievement award.

== See also ==
- Spokes Mashiyane
