= Hyde Park High School (South Africa) =

Location
- 107 3rd Road; Johannesburg, Gauteng, 2196; South Africa
- Coordinates: 26°1′23″S 28°0′41″E

Information
- Type: Public High School
- Motto: "Fidei"
- Religious affiliation: Multi-cultural
- Established: 8 September 1966
- Principal: Mrs M Kallie
- Grades: 8–12
- Gender: Coed (Male and Female)
- Age: 13 to 18
- Enrollment: +\- 800 pupils
- Houses: Rutland, Leicester, Marlborough and Grosvenor
- Colours: Yellow, red, white and blue
- Badge: Golden Eagle surrounded by Olive leaves
- Website: www.hydepark.gp.school.za

Hyde Park High School is a public co-educational secondary school that is in Hyde Park, Johannesburg, South Africa. Although Hyde Park High School is a government school, falling under the Gauteng Department of Education, it offers a matriculation qualification from the IEB (Independent Education Board). This makes Hyde Park High School rather unusual in that it offers the same type of qualification as a private school but retains the status and culture of a government school.

== Current Principal ==
The current principal of Hyde Park High School is Mrs. M Kallie.

== Academics ==
The academic subjects being offered each year include:

- Accounting
- Afrikaans
- Art
- Information technology
- CAT(Computer Applications Technology)
- EGD (Engineer & graphic design)
- English
- Geography
- History
- Life orientation
- Life science
- Mathematics
- Mathematical literacy
- Physical science
- isiZulu

== Extracurricular activities ==
Extracurricular activities at Hyde park:

Summer sports:

- Cricket
- Squash
- Swimming
- Water Polo
- Tennis

Winter sports:

- Athletics
- Cross country
- Soccer
- Hockey
- Rugby
- Squash
- Netball

== Cultural activities ==
Activities offered:

- Backstage
- Debating
- Drama
- Dramatics - Music
- First Aid
- Interact
- Public speaking
- Sound and lighting
- Valentines Ball
- Winter Ball

Rivals of the school include:

- Fourways High School
- Bryanston High School
- Edenvale High School

== School terms ==
School terms at Hyde Park are usually 2-2 and a half months long, with four terms a year. Consisting from 190 - 205 school days a year.

== Notable alumni ==
- Andrew Gordon-Brown (born 1967), rower and school administrator
- Alan Lazar (born 1967), composer and novelist
