= Radio Orion =

- South Africa
- Broadcast area: South Africa

Ownership
- Operator: South African Broadcasting Corporation

Radio Orion was a national FM radio station in South Africa, operated by the South African Broadcasting Corporation. It replaced the All Night Service on 1 March 1983, and was on the air for ten years until its final broadcast on 31 May 1993. The main host was Robin Alexander. The station broadcast at night, beginning at 9:30 PM—following the transmission of Radio Suid-Afrika—and continued until dawn. Its format included "a wide variety of music, phone-in shows and topical discussion."

== See also ==
- List of radio stations in South Africa
- Media of South Africa
- Springbok Radio
