= Kwela =

Street music from southern Africa

Kwela is a genre of street music originating from southern Africa. It is distinguished by its prominent use of the pennywhistle, jazz-inspired elements, and a distinctive skiffle-like rhythm. It evolved from the marabi sound. Kwela brought South African music to international prominence in the 1950s.

Although Kwela has its roots in southern Africa, its later adaptations and many other African folk idioms have permeated Western music (listen to the albums A Swingin' Safari by the Bert Kaempfert Orchestra (1962) and Graceland by Paul Simon (1986)), giving modern South African music, particularly jazz, much of its distinctive sound and lilting swagger. The Piranhas' 1980 UK Top Ten hit 'Tom Hark' was based on an earlier 1950s Kwela hit song.

One reason for the use of the pennywhistle is its affordability and portability. It is also valued for its versatility, functioning effectively as both a solo and ensemble instrument. The popularity of the pennywhistle may be because flutes of different kinds have long been traditional instruments among the peoples of the more northerly parts of South Africa. Thus, the pennywhistle allowed a swift adaptation of folk tunes into the new marabi-influenced music.

== Origin ==
The most common explanation for the word "kwela" is that it is taken from the Zulu for "climb", though in township slang it also referred to police vans, the "kwela-kwela". Thus, it could be an invitation to join the dance, as well as serving as a warning. It is said that the young men who played the pennywhistle on street corners also acted as lookouts to warn those enjoying themselves in the shebeens of the arrival of the police. White people, unaware of its meaning, then thought that it referred to the music when they heard people shouting "Here comes the kwela, kwela!" warning of the police's presence.

Kwela music was influenced by blending the music of Malawian immigrants to South Africa with the local South African sounds. In Chichewa, "kwela" has a similar meaning to the South African one: "to climb". The music was popularised in South Africa and then brought to Malawi, where contemporary Malawian artists have also begun producing kwela music.

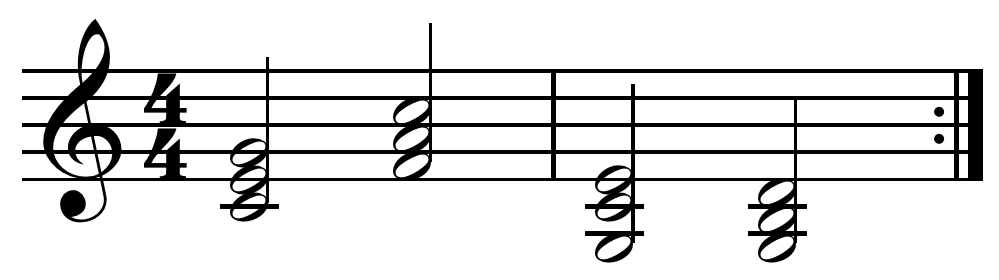
I-IV-I${}^6_4$-V.

Although it has been asserted that kwela music exclusively uses the chord progression I-IV-I${}^6_4$-V., others maintain that there is no specific kwela chord progression, or that I-IV-V-I and I-I-IV-V are particularly prevalent.

== Artists ==
Artists such as Lemmy Mabaso were renowned for their pennywhistle skills, and Spokes Mashiyane was one of the most prominent with his kwela pennywhistle tunes. Other artists include The Skylarks, Jack Lerole, Aaron Lerole, The Solven Whistlers, Kippie Moeketsi, Donald Kachamba from Malawi and Gwigwi Mrwebe.
