= Alan Lazar =

- Born: December 15, 1967 (age 58); Johannesburg, South Africa
- Education: University of Southern California
- Occupations: Composer and novelist
- Writing career
- Language: English
- Website: alanlazar.com

Alan Lazar (born December 15, 1967) is a South African-born composer and novelist. He has written music for more than 50 films and TV shows, including a string of Netflix movies. He was a member of the South African band Mango Groove, and is the author of the book ROAM. He became a US citizen in 2010.

== Early life and education ==
Lazar was born on 15 December 1967 in South Africa and studied at Hyde Park High School. He went on to study at Wits University before leaving his home country of South Africa, to move to the United States. Lazar moved to Los Angeles, where he went on to graduate from the USC School of Cinema Television, as a Fulbright scholar.

== Career ==
During his years in South Africa, Lazar's early career was as a composer and musician. He joined an Afropop band while still studying in the 1980s, called Mango Groove. He played both the piano and keyboard for the band, which was the one of only two music groups in South Africa to have both white and black musicians. He also composed and produced for the band.

After releasing their first studio album in the late 1980s, Mango Groove became a household name in South Africa, achieving platinum record sales. In 1992, Lazar performed with Mango Groove at The Freddie Mercury Tribute Concert. They performed the track "Special Star" via satellite from Johannesburg, South Africa. The group also performed at the 1994 inauguration of Nelson Mandela.

He also composed the track "African Dream" (performed by Vicky Sampson), which was nominated for Song of the Decade in South Africa and was known as "South Africa's unofficial anthem".

He played in front of Nelson Mandela at his inauguration in 1994.

Following his career with Mango Groove, Lazar moved to California as a Fulbright scholar, where he became involved in music production for film and television. This began in 1995. He wrote music for the final episodes of Sex and the City, and scored An American Crime. Lazar received an award for best score from Film Music Magazine for Gangster's Paradise: Jerusalema. During the same year, National Geographic's Swamp of the Baboons was nominated for a production Emmy, with Lazar responsible for all of the music production.

From 2010, he scored The Real Housewives of Beverly Hills, and, from 2012, its sister show, The Real Housewives of Orange County.

Lazar is also the founder of Lalela Music, a production music library. The catalog has been used in thousands of productions globally and in 2017 was sold to STX Entertainment.

In 2021, Lazar co-founded the Luminary Scores catalog with BMG Rights Management, producing and composing for the catalog.

=== ROAM ===
In 2011, Lazar published his first novel, ROAM, published by Atria Books.

ROAM is about a dog named Nelson, a bright-eyed, inquisitive half-beagle, half-poodle. He loses his owners after following his nose and becoming lost. The story follows Nelson through his years of searching for his owner, Katey, along with the scenarios he faces.

The book was runner-up for the Los Angeles Book Festival Best Fiction award.
