= Claire Johnston (musician) =

Anglo-South African singer and songwriter

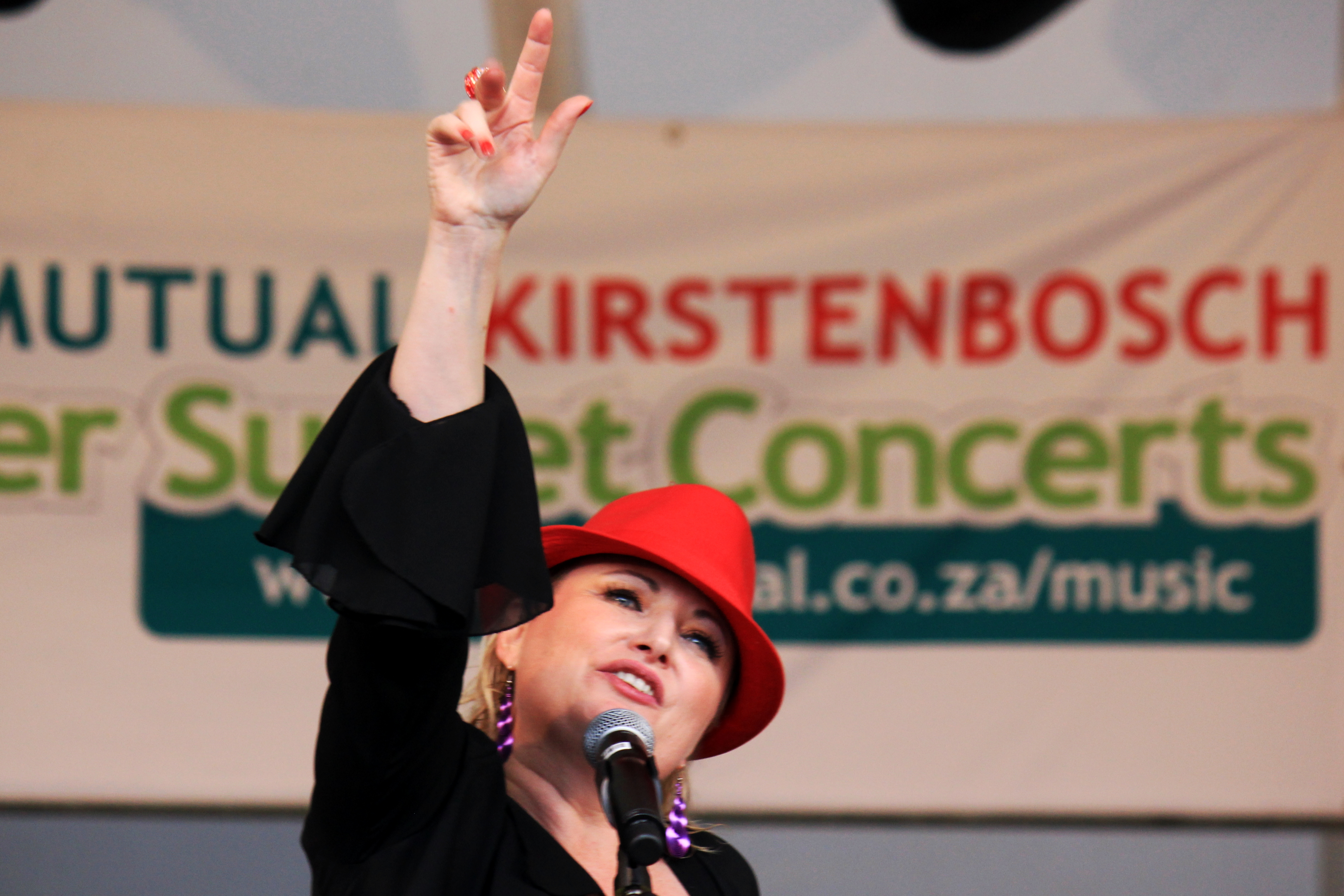
- Johnston on-stage for a Mango Groove concert at Kirstenbosch National Botanical Garden on 1 January 2012

Background information
- Born: 16 December 1967 (age 58); Bishops Stortford, Hertfordshire, England
- Origin: Johannesburg, South Africa
- Genres: Township music, pop music, vocal jazz
- Occupation: Singer
- Labels: Sting Music; EMI
- Website: mangogroove.co.za/claire.html

Claire Johnston (born 16 December 1967) is an Anglo-South African singer and songwriter. She is the lead singer of the South African fusion band Mango Groove.

Born in the South of England, Johnston has lived in South Africa since the age of three. She joined Mango Groove at age 17, and has since recorded six studio albums with the band, toured extensively, and released two solo albums. She has come to be recognised as a symbol of the Rainbow Nation, Desmond Tutu's vision of a multicultural South Africa in the post-apartheid era.

Among her musical influences she lists Ella Fitzgerald and Debbie Harry, as well as Louis Armstrong and the crooners of the mid-20th century.

== Early life and education ==
Johnston was born in Bishops Stortford, a town in the Southern England county of Hertfordshire. Her family relocated to South Africa when she was age three. At the age of ten, she debuted as an actor, dancer, and singer in a Johannesburg production of the musical Annie. At age 17, during her final year at Greenside High School, she joined the crossover band Mango Groove. Despite her obligations to the band, she completed a degree in English, Philosophy, and Politics at the University of the Witwatersrand in 1988.

== Career ==
With Johnston as the front woman, Mango Groove had already released several singles before completing their first album, Mango Groove, which they released in 1989. These pre-album singles Johnston recorded while still working toward her undergraduate degree. Three more studio albums—and numerous singles—followed in the 1990s. After Mango Groove released their fourth studio album in 1995, they did not produce another until 2009's Bang the Drum. The band continued to perform live, but they used the recording hiatus to refresh themselves with separate projects. It was during this period that Johnston recorded her first solo album, Fearless (Sting Music, 2001). All recording was done at Real World Studios in Bath, and at Sarm West Studios and Olympic Studios in London. The tracks on Fearless were produced by Vic Coppersmith-Heaven and Marius de Vries, respectively.

Sometime in or around 2003, Johnston started recording a benefit album with Jeff Maluleke. The album took three years to complete, and was released in 2006 under the title Starehe: An African Day. While work on Starehe was still progressing, Johnston recorded a second solo album, Africa Blue (EMI, 2004). In 2005, she opened for Belinda Carlisle in a double tour of South Africa. On the tour, she sang Mango Groove hits as well as cover songs from Africa Blue. 2006 saw not only the release of Starehe, but EMI's reissue of Fearless and Africa Blue as a double album called The One and Only.

Johnston was involved in the 1999 All-Africa Games, and in South Africa's bid for the 2004 Summer Olympics. She sang the national anthem at the 1998, 2000, and 2001 Rugby League Tri-Nations tournaments. With Mango Groove, she has performed in London, Paris, Hong Kong, and Sydney. She regularly performs "Nkosi Sikelel' iAfrika" at Springbok rugby union internationals.

Mango Groove's most recent album, 2016's Faces to the Sun, was four years in the making.

== Personal life ==
For a time she was married to Mango Groove founder John Leyden. She lives in Johannesburg, South Africa.
