= Robin Auld (musician) =

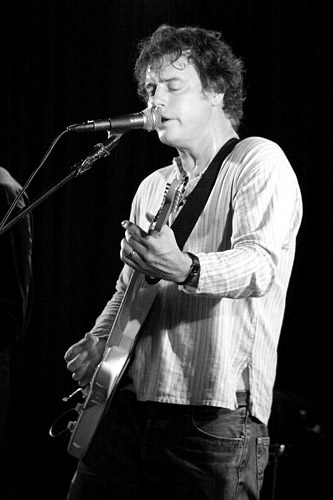

Background information
- Born: Robin Morton Auld; 1959 (age 66–67); Lusaka, Zambia
- Occupations: Musician, writer
- Instruments: Guitar, slide guitar, harmonica
- Website: www.robinauld.co.za

Robin Morton Auld is a South African singer-songwriter, guitarist, poet and writer. He has released twenty albums to date, along with a novel and poetry collection.

== Early life ==
Auld was born in Lusaka, Zambia in 1959, to Scots parents. His father was in the Crown Service as a magistrate and his mother was a nursing sister. After three years on the Zambian copper belt they moved to Sesheke on the Zambezi River, near Livingstone. On his parents' divorce he moved with his mother and brother to Cape Town, South Africa, in 1970. They settled in the False Bay area and he attended both primary and high schools in Fish Hoek.

== Career ==
Auld learned to play the guitar by listening to Carlos Santana, Jimi Hendrix, Ry Cooder and Neil Young. He was also influenced by the African guitar styles of mbaqanga and maskandi after seeing Philip Tabane and Malombo at his first concert experience. He started out playing as a sideman guitarist in several seminal South African bands, most notably the anti-establishment Lancaster Band between 1977 and 1979, which featured Brian Davidson as lead vocalist. Davidson had been the lead vocalist for Freedom's Children, South Africa's leading rock band of the 1970s. On leaving Lancaster Band along with Davidson after their conversion to ska, he joined the Steve Walsh Roots Rhythm band.

In 1982, Warner Brothers South Africa released his first solo album, entitled At the Corner. The album was produced by Kevin "Caveman" Shirley, who also produced another three albums for Auld and his band Z-Astaire on the independent label Mountain Records. This partnership yielded five radio hits including "Baby you've been good to me" and "All of Woman".

In 1986 Auld moved to the UK. The following years saw Auld's music evolve into a roots based sound which further combined his Western guitar influences with the guitarists of Southern Africa such as Tony Cox, Louis Mhlanga, Steve Newman and Madala Kunene. The result was a style described by UK Unpeeled magazine as a "genuine and unaffected flowing together of cultural strands".

On his return to South Africa he won a SAMA in 1992, the South African Grammy equivalent, for the album Love Kills. He then recorded two albums, Heavy Water and Zen Surfing in the 3rd World, with Lloyd Ross of Shifty Records who was responsible for a massive catalogue of alternative South African recordings throughout the apartheid years. After the relentless pattern of handing over albums to be mishandled by South African record companies, Auld started Free Lunch Productions in order to handle his creative output both musical and literary. To date it has released eight albums.

Auld's first novel Tight Lines was published in 2000 by independent ComPress. It tells the tale of a fishing trip through the eyes of a disaffected teenager and uses a South African version of beat writing. Auld acquired the rights back in order to release it through Free Lunch, along with his first collection of poetry, Kelp. Published in 2006, it contains themes concerning the sea, South African culture in general and man's dislocation from nature.

Currently based in Cape Town, Auld tours nationally as a solo artist and as an electric trio, with touring stints back to the UK.

=== Collaborations ===
Over the years many of Southern Africa's top musicians have featured in an Auld line-up or album. These include drummers Barry Van Zyl (Johnny Clegg, Peter Gabriel), Peter Cohen (Bright Blue, Freshlyground), Lloyd Martin (Lancaster Band, James Phillips), Anton Fig (Joan Armatrading, Joe Cocker, Bob Dylan, David Letterman Show). Other musicians who have featured on his recordings include Zimbabwean guitar giant Louis Mhlanga, bass player and producer Keith Lentin (Link Wray, The Band), Johnny Clegg, Schalk Joubert, Simon Orange, Jannie Hanepoot van Tonder, Nelson Barbosa and Robbie Jansen.

Songwriters Auld has collaborated and performed with include Koos Kombuis, Valiant Swart, Lesley Rae Dowling and James Phillips.

== Discography ==
=== Singles ===
- "First and Last"
- "Baby You've Been Good" (1985)
- "All of Woman" (1985) No. 1 on Radio 5 in August 1985
  - "All of Woman" 12" single (1985)
- "After the Fire"
- "Sesheke Town"
- "Love Kills"
- "Perfect Day"
- "Zen Surfing in the 3rd World"
- "All the Girls Cried"

=== Albums ===
- At the Corner (1984)
- Z-Astaire (1985)
- Ocean Motion (1986)
- Live at the 3 Arts (1986)
- Love Kills (1991) South African release
- Zen Surfing in the Third World (1993)
- Love Kills (1995) German release
- Heavy Water (1996)
- Dream of Birds (1998) UK-only
- The Best of Robin Auld Volume 1 (1999)
- Iron in the Sky (November 2000)
- Dream of Birds (March 2002)
- Luxury (March 2003)
- Diamond of a Day (May 2005)
- Jungle of One (January 2006)
- Over the Mountain (October 2008)
- Love Kills (March 2010) International release
- Africana (May 2010)
- Fingers in My Pocket (June 2011)
- Back of the Line (Oct 2014)
- "The Everlovin' Wind" (Nov 2022)

== Bibliography ==
- Tight Lines (2000) Compress ISBN 1-919833-03-X
- Kelp (2006) New Voices Pub. ISBN 1-920094-21-0
