= Guy Buttery =

South African musician

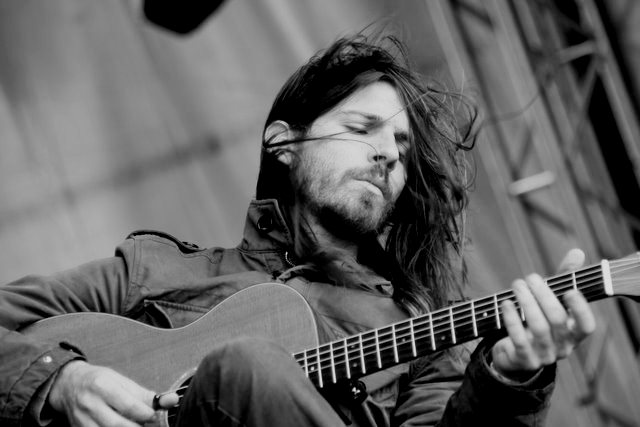
- Guy Buttery live on stage at Rocking The Daisies Festival 2010

Background information
- Born: November 26, 1983 (age 42)
- Origin: Durban, KwaZulu-Natal
- Genres: Afro Folk,Jazz
- Instruments: Guitar; Sitar; Mbira; Saw; Mandolin
- Years active: 2002–present
- Website: guybuttery.co.za

Guy Buttery (born 26 November 1983) is a South African musician primarily known as a guitar player.

Cited as "one of South Africa's most influential artists over the past decade" by The Sunday Independent, Buttery's distinctive acoustic style is influenced by traditional South African culture, music and instrumentation. In live performances, Guy also uses an EBow and a looper to create "synth-like textures". He is influenced by artists such as Michael Hedges, Steve Newman, Madala Kunene, Tony Cox, Tananas, Led Zeppelin, Mark Kozelek and Ralph Towner. Guy has received numerous accolades for his recorded work as well as for his live performances. He has collaborated, toured, supported and recorded with dozens of artists including Dave Matthews, Jethro Tull, multiple Grammy Award winner and founder of Windham Hill Records, William Ackerman, Vusi Mahlasela, Derek Gripper, Piers Faccini, Kaki King, Dan Patlansky, Shawn Phillips, Violent Femmes, Martin Simpson, Salif Keita, the KZN Philharmonic Orchestra, Steve Newman, Jon Gomm, Preston Reed and many others.

== History ==
Guy Buttery was born in a small coastal town outside of Durban, KwaZulu-Natal in South Africa. He has found a way to play his unique style of guitar that is deeply South African while also speaking a global musical language. He studied Jazz at Kwa-Zulu Natal Technikon with Nibs van der Spuy and later on at the Durban School of Music, where he studied classical guitar with Leandros Stavrou for a brief period. At the age of 18, Guy Buttery's debut album was nominated for 'Best Newcomer' and 'Best Instrumental' at the South African Music Awards (SAMA's) making him the youngest nominee in the history of the event. Guy has since gone on to collect four SAMA's in 2010, 2014 and in 2026. He has also received numerous other major accolades including The Ovation Award for his live performances at the National Arts Festival, and has been honoured with more of these prestigious awards than any other musician.

In 2018, Guy received the highest accolade for a musician in South Africa and was awarded the Standard Bank Young Artist Award. In almost 4 decades of honouring artists throughout the country, this was the first time since its inception that the award was presented to a musician outside of the classical realm. The following year, Guy toured across 5 continents and released a collaborative album, titled "Nāḍī", with Indian born sitar player and vocalist, Kanada Narahari. The album was voted a "Top of the World" release by leading World Music publication Songlines.

Guy has since been invited to perform his works with the 52-piece KZN Philharmonic Orchestra dubbed "Africa's greatest ensemble" with his solo performance voted "Top Live Show" by The Cape Times and was selected by the public as one of South Africa's Top Young Personalities by The Mail & Guardian.

With tours cancelled all around the world due to COVID-19, Buttery went into "studio mode" and released 5 albums in 2020. These releases consisted mostly of archival projects including two live releases (one with Derek Gripper and another with Nibs van der Spuy), a collaborative EP with marimba band and horn section The Bandura Express Marimba Ensemble, a demos release featuring outtakes and unreleased recordings surrounding Guy's 2016 self-titled album and a remix album titled "Sonokota EP" featuring producers from Wales, Berlin, Maputo, Cape Town and New York.

In 2021 Buttery released yet another collaborative album, this time with traditional Indian classical musicians Mohd. Amjad Khan (tabla) and Mudassir Khan (sarangi). Recorded in a singular session in India in a largely improvised setting, "One Morning in Gurgaon" continues Guy's love affair with the music of the subcontinent. The record received critical acclaim landing up on numerous album of the year lists including NPR, New Sounds and PopMatters and also charted in the World Music Charts Europe. The record was then picked up in Japan for a vinyl release in a curated album series by Qrates.

2025 saw Buttery's long standing orchestral project finally released in the form of the studio album "Orchestrations". Despite the record coming close to never seeing the light of day at all, the project took over 12 years to complete and has been described as something of a "magnum opus". With Buttery's own guitar at the centre of the work, "Orchestrations" was crafted over many years with orchestral arranger Chris Letcher. Recorded across ten countries, the album features collaborative contributions from several renowned artists including Kaki King, Madala Kunene, Derek Gripper, Louis Mhlanga, Julian Sartorius, Mudassir Khan and Pino Forastiere. The album went on to win two South Africa Music Awards (in the Best Instrumental and Best Engineer categories) as well as being nominated by the public for Album of the Year.

== Discography ==
- When I Grow Up... (2002)
- Songs from the Cane Fields (2005)
- Fox Hill Lane (2009)
- To Disappear in Place (2011)
- In the Shade of the Wild Fig with Nibs van der Spuy (2012)
- Live in KwaZulu (2013)
- Guy Buttery (2016)
- Khaya Records 7" Series Vol. III [with Madala Kunene] (2017)
- Nāḍī [with Kanada Narahari] (2019)
- Stam / The Tree [film score] (2020)
- Live in Cape Town [with Derek Gripper] (2020)
- Guy Buttery & The Bandura Express Marimba Ensemble [with Bandura] (2020)
- The Farm Demos (2020)
- Live in Lisbon [with Nibs van der Spuy] (2020)
- Sonokota EP [with Kanada Narahari] (2020)
- Live from Another Time - A Concert Film [featuring Kaki King (2021)
- One Morning in Gurgaon [with Mohd. Amjad Khan & Mudassir Khan] (2021)
- Live in Dlinza Forest - A Concert Film [with Nibs van der Spuy] (2021)
- In The Shadow of the Wild Fig - single [with Julian Redpath] (2022)
- '56 — Live in Cape Town - single [with Derek Gripper] (2023)
- Konko Man Version2 - Live at Westville Theatre Club - single [with Madala Kunene] (2023)
- Two Chords and The Truth (Orchestrations) - single [with Mudassir Khan] (2024)
- Orchestrations (2025)
- Live at The White House - cassette only release [with Derek Gripper] (2025)
- Songs from the Cane Fields (20th Anniversary Deluxe Edition) (2025)
- December Poems (Live In Its Orchestral Form) - single [with The KwaZulu-Natal Philharmonic Orchestra] (2026)
- Improvisations From a Rural Church: Volume I (2026)

== Awards and nominations ==
- 2003 SAMA 'Best Instrumental' and 'Best Newcomer' Award Nominations for "When I Grow Up..."
- 2006 SAMA 'Best Instrumental Album' Nomination for "Songs from the Cane Fields"
- 2010 SAMA 'Best Instrumental Album' Award Winner for "Fox Hill Lane"
- 2010 Ovation Award - 'Gold' for 'Best Music' at the National Arts Festival
- 2012 SAMA 'Best Instrumental Album' Nomination for "To Disappear in Place"
- 2012 SAMA 'Best Instrumental Album' Nomination for "In The Shade of the Wild Fig"
- 2012 Mail & Guardian Top Young South African - Voted by the public
- 2014 Ovation Award - 'Silver' for 'Best Music' at the National Arts Festival
- 2014 SAMA 'Best Classical and/or Instrumental Album' Award Winner for "Live in KwaZulu"
- 2016 SAMA 'Best Instrumental Album' Nomination for "Guy Buttery"
- 2018 Standard Bank Young Artist Award for 'Music' (South Africa's highest accolade for the Arts)
- 2020 Songlines Magazine Voted "Nāḍī" a "Top of the World" release
- 2021 SAMA 'Best Instrumental Album' Nomination for "Live in Lisbon"
- 2021 SAMA 'Best Instrumental Album' Nomination for "Live in Cape Town"
- 2022 World Music Charts Europe charted at #10 for "One Morning in Gurgaon"
- 2025 Songlines Magazine Voted "Orchestrations" a "Top of the World" release
- 2026 SAMA 'Best Instrumental Album' Award Winner for "Orchestrations"
- 2026 SAMA 'Best Engineered Album' Award Winner for "Orchestrations"
- 2026 SAMA 'Album of the Year' Nomination for "Orchestrations"

== Guest features and compilation appearances ==
- Nibs van der Spuy — Flower in the Rain (2002) — mandolin
- Vusi Mahlasela (with Dave Matthews) — Guiding Star (Naledi Ya Tsela) (2006) — guitar, mandolin
- Nibs van der Spuy — Beautiful Feet (2006) — guitar, sitar, mandolin
- Cabins in the Forest — Spells for Bribes (2008) — sitar, saw
- Luke Siedle — Our Stories (2008) — co-producer, mandolin, guitar
- Nibs van der Spuy — A Bird in the Hand (2008) — mandolin, sitar
- Julian Redpath — Shipwrecks EP (2009) — ebow, saw
- Farryl Purkiss — Fruitbats & Crows (2009) — guitar
- Dan Patlansky — Move My Soul (2009) — sitar, guitar, claps
- Eland Gray — Contraption Distoria (2010) — ebow, guitar
- Nibs van der Spuy — A House Across the River (2010) — sitar
- Versions of Joanna — Joanna Newsom Tribute Album — Compilation (2010) — guitar, loops, ebow
- Lilo — Lossless (2010) — ebow, saw
- Andrew James & The Steady Tiger — Red in Tooth and Claw (2011) — guitar, mandolin, engineer
- Home Grown Music — Vol. 1 — Compilation (2011) — koto, monochord
- South African Music Awards — Vol. 1 — Compilation (2011) — guitar
- Eland Gray — Midnight Atlas (2012) — mbira
- Nibs van der Spuy — Crossing Borders, Driving North — Compilation (2013) — mandolin, guitar, sitar
- Hinds Brothers — Ocean of Milk (2013) — sitar, tanpura
- Eland Gray — My Memory's Death (2013) — sitar
- Madala Kunene — 1959 (2015) — guitar, sitar, saw
- Seb Goldswain — Pictures of a Thousand Words (2015) — engineer
- Julian Redpath — Maiden Moonlight (2015) — co-producer, engineer, saw, synth-guitar
- Splashy Fen — 25 — Compilation (2015) — mbira
- Nibs van der Spuy — Natalia (2016) — guitar
- Madala Kunene — Khaya Records 7" Series Vol. III (2017) — producer, engineer, guitar
- Daniel Basckin — Archive (2017) — co-producer, sitar
- Kanada Narahari — Vistar (2018) — producer, engineer
- Cape Town Folk 'n Acoustic Music Festival — Live at Kirstenbosch — DVD Compilation (2018) — mbira, guitar
- La Vache — Toi Matelot EP (2019) — sitar
- Songlines — Top Of The World 155 — Compilation (2020) — guitar, tanpura
- Nibs van der Spuy — A Circle of Swallows — Compilation (2020) — mandolin, guitar, sitar
- James Yorkston — other folk, remixed (2020) — electric guitar
- Madala Kunene — Forest Jam Vol. III (2020) — guitar
- Aidan Martin — Just Like Water (2020) — guitar
- Radiant Tribe — The Heart Sutra (2020) — ebow
- Shane Cooper — Small Songs For Big Times Vol.2 (2020) — swarmandal, tanpura, passerelle guitar
- Innisfree — Empire Unbecoming (2020) — swarmandal
- The Rough Guide To Spiritual India — Compilation (2022) — guitar, tanpura
- Nibs van der Spuy — Maiden of the River (2022) — swarmandal, sitar, engineer
- Moodship — Relics (2023) — sitar
- Wren Hinds — Don't Die In The Bundu (2023) — swarmandal, shakuhachi
- Piers Faccini — Songs I Love Volume II (2023) — acoustic guitar
- Madala Kunene — Remixes 2023 Reel One (2023) — acoustic guitar
- Derek Gripper — Lost Time: Bach's First Cello Suite (2024) — tanpura
- Jonno Sweetman — Otherside (2024) — acoustic guitar, ebow
- Shajara Ensemble — Shajara (2024) — ebow
- Lucy Kruger & The Lost Boys — A Human Home (2024) — guitar, ebow, frame drum, shakuhachi, tanpura
- Derek Gripper — Everyday Things: Bach's Second Cello Suite (2024) — tanpura
- Songlines — Top Of The World 206 — Compilation (2025) — sitar, tanpura
- Moodship — What I Couldn't Carry (2025) — swarmandal, drones
- Innisfree — A View (2026) — sitar, engineer
- Innisfree — Wherever You Go, You See Them (2026) — guitar, sitar, engineer
