= Splashy Fen =

South African music festival

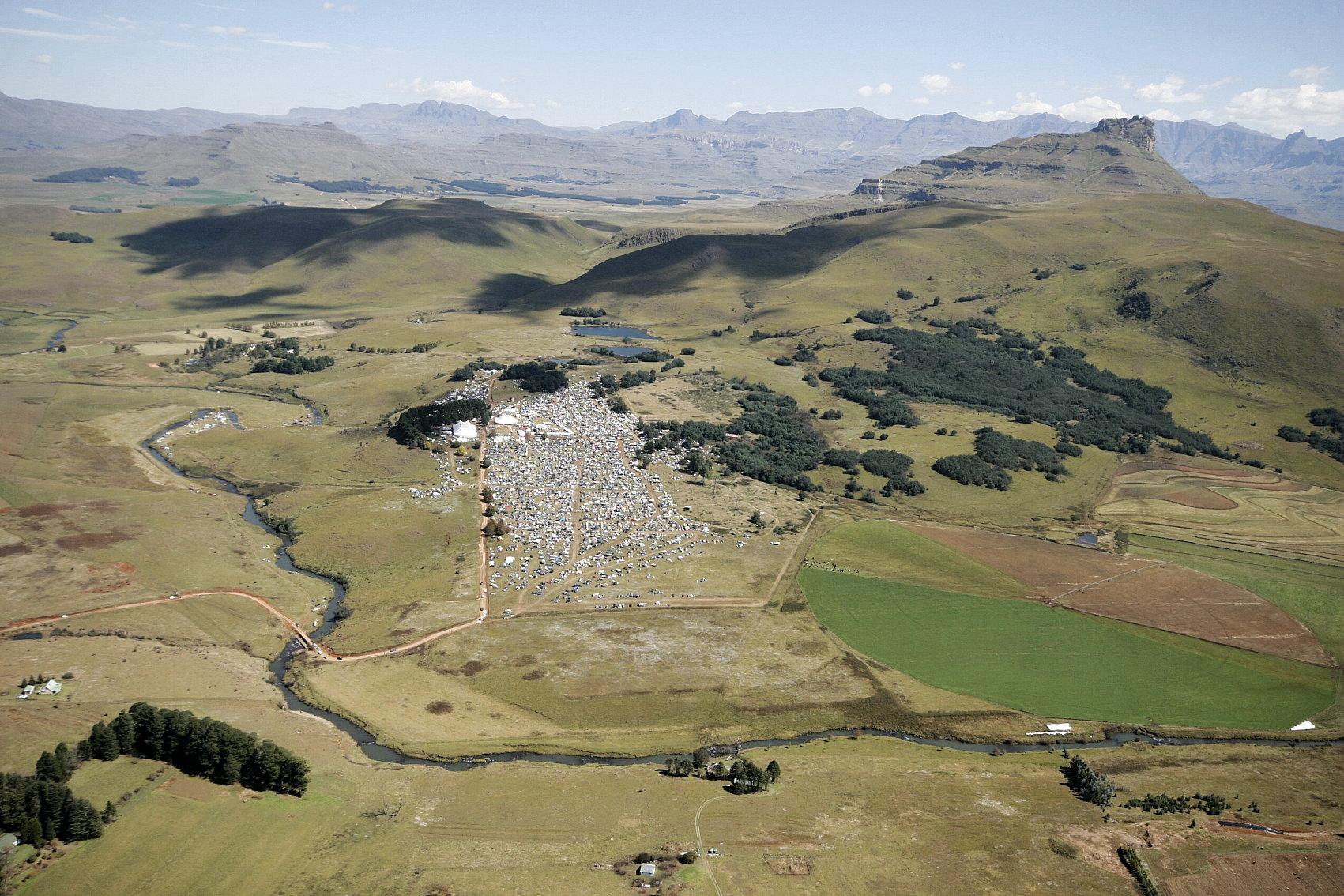
- The Ultimate Outdoor Experience!
- Genre: Rock & Folk
- Dates: Easter weekend
- Locations: Underberg, KwaZulu-Natal, South Africa
- Years active: since 1990
- Founders: Bart Fokkens and Peter Ferraz
- Website: http://www.splashyfen.co.za

Established in 1990, Splashy Fen is South Africa's longest-running music festival, which every Easter attracts thousands of people to a farm near Underberg, KwaZulu-Natal for a unique outdoor music experience. Also present are arts and crafts stalls, food and drink outlets, crèche and children's entertainment programme, as well as various camping and accommodation options. The most recent festival took place from 28 March-1 April 2024.

Well-known artists who have performed at Splashy Fen over the years include: Wheatus, Bowling for Soup, Kim Churchill, Syd Kitchen, Mark Schonau, Tony Cox, Steve Newman, Ladysmith Black Mambazo, Vusi Mahlasela, Koos Kombuis, Shawn Phillips, Hinds Brothers, Madala Kunene, Neill Solomon, Jimm Harisson Project, Landscape Prayers, Tananas, Just Jinjer, Hothouse Flowers, Tree63, Dan Patlansky, Watershed, Springbok Nude Girls, The Parlotones, Prime Circle and Chris Chameleon.

Don Clarke, convener of the Legends of the Fen show, and his partner Dicky Roberts, have been managing and hosting the Legends showcase at the festival since 2016. This initiative brought South African icons like Steve Fataar (14 March 1943 – 31 January 2020) back to the festival. In 2019, Don Clarke and P J Powers shared the stage and performed the 1986 hit song, Sanbonani.

== Ultimate Splashy Fen Song ==
Don Clarke wrote the song, "Hey-na Splashy" in 2008, the year he made his debut appearance at the festival.

== See also ==
- Music of South Africa
- Musical Performance
- In The City
- Oppikoppi
- RAMFest
