= Eerste Alternatiewe Afrikaanse Rockkonsert =

Rock concert

The Eerste Alternatiewe Afrikaanse Rockkonsert (first Alternative Afrikaner Rock Concert) was a concert held on March 25, 1988, in the Johannesburg Pool Club. The concert was organized by Dagga-Dirk Uys (now known as Dirk Ace) and Boogie Gottschalk of Shifty Records, and was known as the beginning of the Voëlvry Movement.

Artists that performed there included André Letoit (today known as Koos Kombuis) and Johannes Kerkorrel's Gereformeerde Blues Band, Bernoldus Niemand and Die Swart Gevaar ("the black danger"), as well as other groups such as the Genuines, Koos, and Die Kêrels ("the boys"). This was Niemand's first live performance. The concert was attended by around 900 people.

The concert was originally to be held at the Yeoville Recreation Center, which belonged to the city government, but when the city council proclaimed blacks unwelcome there, the venue was shifted to the Pool Club on Von Wielligh Street. The Cape Times (July 1, 1988) called the concert "a (sic) unprecedented orgy of Afrikaner anarchy".
