= The Bassline (club) =

Music venue in Johannesburg

Coordinates: 26.20471921611754°S 28.03081643877052°E

The Bassline live music venue and club was established in 1994 in the Melville neighborhood of Johannesburg, South Africa. The venue closed in 2003 and reopened the following year in the downtown Newtown Cultural Precinct, featuring a concert venue with a capacity of 1000 and a performing space with 150 seats. In its 24-year history, Bassline hosted over 3200 concerts featuring many emerging music acts and well-known South African, African, and global music icons.

Musicians who have played at Bassline include Hugh Masekela, Miriam Makeba, Johnny Clegg, Vusi Mahlasela, Zim Ngqawana, Moses Molelekwa, Paul Hanmer, Marcus Wyatt, Tumi and the Volume and Jimmy Dludlu, among others.

Many popular albums were recorded live at the Bassline, and the record company of the same name became a fixture in the Johannesburg music scene. Vusi Mahlasela and Louis Mhlanga recorded their live album Live at the Bassline in 1999.

From 2017, Bassline evolved into Bassline Live, producing and promoting live concerts for broadcast and live audiences. Bassline Live hosts regular performances at Johannesburg's Lyric Theatre at Gold Reef City, as well as annual festivals - Bassline Festival held on the Saturday closest to the Africa Union's official Africa Day on 25 May, Bassline Summer Fest in December, and the Fete de la Musique Festival for the French Institute of South Africa.

Bassline's history is chronicled in Last Night at the Bassline, by David B. Coplan & Oscar Gutierrez.
