= Roger Lucey =

- Born: 21 January 1954 (age 72); Durban
- Genres: rock 'n roll, blues, jazz, kwela
- Years active: 1977–present
- Labels: 3rd Ear Music, Wea International, Rootspring
- Website: www.rogerlucey.co.za

Roger Lucey (born 1954) is a South African musician, journalist, filmmaker, actor, and educator. In the late 1970s and early 1980s his early career as a musician was destroyed by Paul Erasmus of the Security Branch of the South African Police, because the lyrics to Lucey's protest songs were considered a threat to the Apartheid State. Although already aware of his anti-apartheid songs, the South African Government's security apparatus only swung into action to destroy Lucey's career after he performed a radical song in a programme on Voice of America radio. The criminal methods used against Lucey formed part of the testimony given by Paul Erasmus in front of the South African Truth and Reconciliation Commission.

== Career ==
Roger Lucey was born in 1954 and grew up in Durban and was strongly influenced by his Zulu friend Jabulani Makatini. Alongside Makatini, Lucey as a young white child went into the townships which revealed a side from which most white South Africans were separated as per law. According to Drewett "Lucey grew increasingly aware of the incongruence between apartheid ideology and the lived experience of black South Africans." As a result of this awareness, Lucey began writing protest songs based on this inequality and injustice in South Africa.

Lucey started as a folk musician playing acoustic guitar and singing covers and his own songs with a very gravelly voice. He started performing in Durban's coffee bars but did not, however, distance himself from political issues such as Alan Jeffrey, Steve Newman, the Kitchen Brothers and Jan Hofmeyer. His musical style focused on rock 'n roll fused with blues, jazz and kwela. Lucey can be regarded as an "activist-performing" through his political songs, who believed in the anti-apartheid movement. Despite this, he did not join a political group or become an official spokesperson for any group. Moreover, when performing live he was oftentimes accompanied by a three-man band called the Zub Zub Marauders with Lucey himself playing guitar and singing. In addition to Lucey, the group consists of Ilne Hofmeyr, Tich James and Jonny Blundell.

During the 1970s, Roger Lucey performed his political songs throughout the Johannesburg circuit also performing in bigger venues such as His Majesty's Theatre and the Market Theatre. He gained widespread popularity through live performances but also through the release of his albums The Road is Much Longer (1979) and Half Alive (1980). He also received publicity through the press and an interview for a radio programme by Voice of America that played his political songs. However, Lucey also received unwanted attention in the form of the South African Police after the interview had aired.

The police set up a variety of measures into silencing Roger Lucey's message led by Paul Erasmus. Drewett stated that "[t]hese included attending and recording Lucey’s shows (later to be transcribed), raiding his house, interrogating him, bugging his telephone, intercepting his post, and monitoring press reports about Lucey." Letters he obtained of invitations to festivals and clubs were destroyed and news regarding forthcoming performances were used to threaten venue owners. After the release of his records, they were confiscated from the independent stores and by 1974 with the passing of the Publications Act, censorship of Lucey grew harsher. A Directorate of Publications were set up through the law, which subsequently banned Lucey's The Road is Much Longer (1979). This, however debilitating, did not stop Lucey from recording and performing his music.

Roger Lucey also wrote the protest song "Lungile Thabalza" (1979), which was also subjected to banning by the Directorate of Publications. The song discusses an activist who died in police custody. Lucey, along with Jennifer Ferguson, the Kalahari Surfers and the Cherry Faced Lurchers, among others, contributed songs to Shifty Records' Forces Favourites, which was a support to the End Conscription Campaign. Lucey also wrote songs such as "You only need say nothing" (1979) and "The boys are in town" (1980) that commented on the South African Border War. Roger Lucey also toured internationally to countries such as Britain, United States, Botswana and Namibia, among others.

Roger Lucey formed part of a group that offered an alternative to apartheid hegemony alongside James Phillips, the Kalahari Surfers, Juluka, Savuka, Bright Blue, Mzwakhe Mbuli, Bayete, and Stimela.

=== Educational qualifications ===
Lucey holds a Master of Arts in Liberal Studies from Duke University, North Carolina.

=== Musician, songwriter and composer ===
Lucey has recorded five albums of his own songs. He has composed music for several documentaries and plays, and has toured Namibia and South Africa playing guitar, keyboard, saxophone, flute and percussion.

=== Actor, playwright and writer ===
Extensive work as voice artist on commercials and documentary films. Actor on commercials, both local and international, and performer in films, drama series and plays. Worked with Nicolas Ellenbogen and Theatre for Africa. Writer of two plays for Theatre for Africa; The High Cost of Living directed by Andrew Brent, and Newsroom directed by Nicolas Ellenbogen. Both premiered at the National Arts Festival, Grahamstown. Writer of several articles on news related stories. An article on the conflict in Chechnya (published in Playboy magazine) was nominated for a Mondi award. Arts correspondent for Cape Etc., a lifestyle magazine based in Cape Town. Wrote a chapter in Shoot the Singer!: Music Censorship Today.

Roger Lucey's book, Back in From the Anger, was published in 2012 by Jacana Media. It recounts his experience as a young musician in South Africa during the 1970s and 1980s.

=== Archive ===
Lucey donated his archival material including photographs, vinyl records, letters and documents, to the Hidden Years Music Archive, preserved at the Documentation Centre for Music, Stellenbosch University, in 2017.

== Discography ==
Roger Lucey produced four albums, namely:

- Running for Cover (1979) through 3rd Ear Music.
- Half a Live (1980) through Wea International.
- Gypsy Soul (2002)
- Now Is the Time (2015) through Rootspring.
