= When You Come Back =

When You Come Back may refer to:

- When You Come Back (album), a 1992 album by Vusi Mahlasela, or the title song
- When You Come Back (song), a 1919 World War I song
