= PJ Powers =

South African musician (born 1960)

- Also known as: Thandeka
- Born: Penelope Jane Dunlop; 16 July 1960 (age 66); Durban, Province of Natal, South Africa (now in KwaZulu-Natal, South Africa)
- Genres: Afro-pop; pop
- Occupation: Musician
- Years active: 1979–present
- Formerly of: Pantha, Hotline
- Website: www.pjpowers.co.za

PJ Powers (born Penelope Jane Dunlop, 16 July 1960, Durban) is a South African singer and performer. She became a household name in southern Africa after the widespread success of the song “Jabulani”. When she played at the Jabulani Amphitheatre in 1983 she was hailed by the crowd with the name “Thandeka”. On the stage she drank from a calabash as part of the performance to the delight of the audience. World in Union 95, the Ladysmith Black Mambazo version featuring PJ Powers, became an international hit record in 1995. It reached no. 47 in the UK singles charts.

PJ Powers garnered attention for her human rights advocacy, philanthropy, and activism against apartheid.

== Early life and career ==
PJ Powers was born in Durban, Province of Natal (now in KwaZulu-Natal), South Africa on 16 July 1960. Her singing career kicked off in 1979 when she became the lead singer of an all female group called Pantha. It disbanded after a year. PJ Powers went on to front a new band, Hotline. Their sound, afro-pop fusion music framing PJ Powers' distinctive voice, attracted an expanded, cross cultural fan base.

The band lasted for seven years and produced some of the biggest South African hits of the 1980s. The formula of young, energetic musicians performing vibrant music in all areas was well accepted by their youthful target audience. PJ was then given the name Thandeka, meaning "Loved One", by the people of South Africa, a name she continued to hold true to her heart. Hotline took music to the people. This increased their popularity and grew their fan base in the neighbouring countries of Botswana, Mozambique, and Namibia.

Combining music that people could dance to with messages of hope and reconciliation was different to what was played on the radio at the time. “You're So Good to Me” (1982), written by PJ Powers, was her first big hit. Powers followed up by writing more hits, including "I Feel So Strong" (1983 duet with Steve Kekana), "Home to Africa" (1985), and "There is an Answer" (1986).

Hotline disbanded in 1987 and subsequently Powers pursued a solo career.

== Solo career ==
1988: PJ Powers was banned from radio and TV for a year by the apartheid government for her performance at a charity concert for war orphans in Zimbabwe, along with Miriam Makeba and Harry Belafonte. She was encouraged to continue her singing by Nelson Mandela, who sent her an encouraging letter from Victor Verster Prison in Cape Town.

1990: Powers's music developed the Afropop genre further, cementing her receptive audience in the black market.

1995: The Ladysmith Black Mambazo recording "World in Union" (feat P J Powers) reached no. 47 on the UK Singles Chart. She performed the song live at the opening of the Rugby World Cup in Cape Town for a worldwide television audience.

PJ Powers has shared the stage with Eric Clapton, Joan Armatrading, Hugh Masekela, Divine Divas, Lord Richard Attenborough, Richard E. Grant, Sibongile Khumalo, Janet Suzman and others. She sang for Queen Elizabeth of the United Kingdom, King Juan Carlos of Spain, Queen Beatrix of the Netherlands and at the inauguration of President Nelson Mandela. She collaborated with Vicky Sampson, Yvonne Chaka Chaka and M'du Masilela for the music video flighted at the United Nations Assembly in Washington, D.C., and in Greece.

2009: Powers' recording of "World in Union" was featured in the Academy Award–nominated film, Invictus.

2019: Songwriter Don Clarke and PJ Powers performed Sanbonani, which he wrote, together on the Legends Stage at Splashy Fen, 33 years after Powers won the SABC Song for South Africa competition with this song.

== Honours and awards ==
- 1986: Won the SABC Song for South Africa competition with Sanbonani, a reconciliation song written by Don Clarke
- 2000: Nelson Mandela presented Powers with a commemorative limited edition gold coin
- 2007: Appointed as a South African Tourism Ambassador
- 2003: The Institute for Justice and Reconciliation honoured P J Powers and Sibongile Khumalo with their prestigious annual award, promoting reconciliation by "singing people together"
- 2004: Voted 93rd in the Top 100 Great South Africans
- 2003: Supermarket chain Pick 'n Pay Stores nominated her as one of their "Stars of Charity" recognising that she "made a difference in uplifting the youth of South Africa"
- 2013: Honoured with a Living Legends award
- 2021: Honoured with the Lifetime Achievement Award at the 27th South African Music Awards

Powers has been extensively involved with the Reach For a Dream Foundation, as well as the Hamlet Foundation. She was commissioned by the President's office to write and perform a song for the Children's Rights Commission.
