= Wisdom of Forgiveness =

Studio album by Vusi Mahlasela
- Released: 24 May 1994

Vusi Mahlasela chronology
When You Come Back (1992)	Wisdom of Forgiveness (1994)	Silang Mabele (1997)

Wisdom of Forgiveness is Vusi Mahlasela's second album released on 24 May 1994.

The album features Ntemi Piliso on alto saxophone, Victor Masondo on bass, Ian Herman on drums, Kelly Petlane on flute, Louis Mhlanga on guitar, and Bruce Cassidy on trumpet and trombone. It was arranged by Jannie Van Tonder and featured Vusi Mahlasela as songwriter, and also on vocals and acoustic guitar.

== Track listing ==
1. "Hope"
2. "Ntate Mahlasela"
3. "Ubuhle Bomhlaba"
4. "Tontobane"
5. "Fountain"
6. "Basimanyana"
7. "Yithi Masotsha"
8. "Don't Tramp on Me"
9. "Emigodini"
10. "Nquondo Phumula"
11. "Two Birds"
12. "Treason"
13. "Wisdom of Forgiveness"
