= Baloi =

Baloi may refer to:

- Gito Baloi (1964–2004), Mozambican musician
- Balo-i, a municipality in Lanao del Norte, Philippines
- Baloi language (Niger–Congo)
- Baloi, Yaring, Pattani Province, Thailand
