= Syd Kitchen =

South African musician (1951–2011)

- Syd Kitchen in Durban, South Africa

Background information
- Born: Sydney Stanley Kitchen; 14 February 1951; Durban, South Africa
- Died: 22 March 2011 (aged 60) Durban, South Africa
- Genres: Folk Music, Jazz, African, World music, Celtic, Rock Music
- Occupations: Musician, singer-songwriter, poet
- Instruments: Guitar, vocals, mandolin, sitar, hosepipe flute
- Years active: 1968–2011
- Labels: No Budget Records, Kitchen Kulture
- Formerly of: Steve Newman, Tony Cox, Madala Kunene, John Martyn

Sydney Stanley Kitchen (14 February 1951 – 22 March 2011), was a South African guitarist, singer-songwriter and poet. Because of his uncompromising attitude towards the music industry he became an iconic figure in his native South Africa, and also around the world, albeit in relatively small circles. Up until his death he was the only artist to perform at every single Splashy Fen festival. He was known for the socio-political messages of his lyrics, while the title of his 2001 album, Africa's Not for Sissies, became one of the most popular one-liners in South Africa. A documentary film was recently released on his life entitled "Fool in a Bubble". Kitchen's career of over 45 years as a performing musician gave him a richly varied musical background. He was involved in a host of musical ventures that included Harry was a Snake, an experimental acoustic outfit, Curry and Rice with guitarist Steve Newman, the seven-piece jazz outfit Equinoxe, Bafo Bafo with Zulu guitarist Madala Kunene, The Aquarian Quartet with fellow aquarians Tony Cox, Steve Newman and Greg Georgiades and of course his own solo career.

== Early life ==
Syd was born in Durban, South Africa. At a young age he started singing in the local church. His parents ran a weekly Saturday night session at the local football club and one Saturday Syd sang with the local band called The Kittens. The crowd so loved his performance that every Saturday he would join the band to sing a few songs. In 1967 his band Parkinson's Law came second in the Durban Battle of the Bands.

== Career ==
In his teens Syd began performing with his brother Pete as "The Kitchen Brothers". His musical involvement with Pete lasted seven years during which they performed their own brand of acoustic folk music. They appeared at folk festivals around the country and were recorded as festival guests by David Marks' SAFMA label and in their own right by the SABC's World Service for external broadcast to North America, Europe, Japan and North Africa.

By the late 1970s Pete Kitchen had moved on to a career outside of music, and in 1978 Syd formed jazz-rock band Equinoxe. Then in 1979 Kitchen formed the experimental acoustic outfit "Harry was a Snake".

In 1980 Kitchen embarked on a solo career and began working on a number of musical revues which included his own "S'No Good and the Reason Why" and two successful Bob Dylan revues. During this time he continued writing not only songs, but also his own uniquely personal poetry and prose that had already sold more than 3000 copies when published as an anthology titled "Scars That Shine" a few years earlier.

In 1982 Syd opened "Syd Kitchen's Guitar Saloon", a guitar shop in Durban which soon became a mecca for local musicians, serving as a venue for both concerts and clinics that featured musicians from all over the country. While Syd was working in his guitar shop he focused on honing his skills across a large array of musical styles. The rapid blooming of his guitar playing was reflected in the steady stylistic growth of his writing, as he began to feed rock, country, jazz, blues and African music into his now trademark lyrical quirks and musical detours.

=== Waiting for the Heave ===
Kitchen, who had meanwhile closed his guitar shop, spent the second half of the ‘80s leading his band named "Syd Kitchen & the Utensils", with male backing singers known as the Kitchenettes. Their self-released 1987 album "Waiting For The Heave" was Kitchen's first commercial recording aside from tracks on a few hopelessly rare ‘70s folk festival compilations. The album reflected Kitchen's increasingly politicised songwriting, while living in a repressive apartheid regime. Due to lack of radio play and South Africa's strict international boycotts, "Waiting for the Heave" was a commercial failure.

In the late 1980s, live performance, low key and relatively infrequent, remained the only reliable way to hear Syd Kitchen.

1990 marked the first annual Splashy Fen, a folk festival which has become one of the most celebrated festivals on the African continent. For a number of South African music fans, the enduring memory of Syd Kitchen will be his performances at Splashy Fen each year from 1990 to 2010.

Around this time, David Marks, a local music veteran who wrote "Master Jack" in 1968, released the live album, Warts 'n All, on his Third Ear Music label in 1992, praised as a "thoroughly engaging demonstration" of the attraction of a Syd Kitchen gig.

=== City Child ===
In 1995 Kitchen released his second album entitled City Child. The creation of City Child was a lengthy process. Started in early 1988, the album went through several stop/start phases before its eventual completion. The rhythm section was recorded live in February 1988 before it went into storage for a period of years. Music was added slowly between 1991 and 1994, before finally emerging to excellent countrywide reviews in 1995. Initially recorded with a Fostex 16 track analogue machine, the album was digitally processed before being mastered in Stuttgart Germany.

Kitchen says of City Child: "It was also difficult to do in so far as the subject matter I was writing about was concerned. Some of the songs had been written as early as 1975, and some while the album was being made. I was going through a seriously tough time of personal shit that all helped shape the course of the work. This introspective spin, and the quality of the (mainly jazz) musicians involved, contributed to the album's eventual ambiance; 10 tight little quirky "jazz" tunes."

=== Amakoologik ===
In 1999 Syd Kitchen released Amakoologik. The title itself is a parody on the many names beginning with "ama" that South African's give to their sporting teams to galvanise national support and create a feeling of racial integration. Kitchen himself said of the album title: "I have coined the name AMAKOOL (the cool) to signify the way we can go about life unconcerned with the guy in the gutter. We can sit eating supper and watch seemingly unaffected as CNN or the BBC delivers graphic images of Rwandan "stick people" or the like into our de-sensitized lives. Our collective apathy is the product of what I call AMAKOOLOGIK (the cool logic). My naïve hope is that millions will hear that word and ask themselves one central question: Aren't you amazed that its so alive and still going on?""

The lyrics of the title track are perhaps one of the best examples of Kitchen's socio-political lyric writing, describing the opposite ends of the social spectrum, not just in South Africa but worldwide.

=== Africa's Not for Sissies ===
Africa's Not for Sissies is probably the album that has earned him most plaudits. Released in 2001 on Kitchen's own No Budget Records, the album received much critical acclaim and was nominated 4th in the SA Rock Digest's Top 30 Albums of 2001. Africa's Not for Sissies was also acclaimed for Kitchen's intricate guitar technique.

Richard Haslop has commented that "Africa's Not for Sissies is a trenchant, if inimitably humorous and often moving reflection on his own status as a white South African committed to living in a country that so many of his compatriots were leaving."

John Samson of SA Rock Digest said of the album: "He has struck at the very core of the new South Africa and everything it has to offer. Syd has the red dust of Africa running through his veins and a finger firmly on the pulse of a nation going through the birth pains of being born again. He is the hippest of hippies and has produced an album of extreme beauty and social awareness. This is a profound and important album, ignore it at your peril."

In 2004 Kitchen embarked on a successful solo tour abroad during which he performed in England, Wales, Norway and Denmark, at among others, the Glastonbury Festival in England and the Kongsberg Jazz Festival in Norway.

=== Bafo Bafo: What Kind? ===
Africa's Not for Sissies was followed by the formation of Bafo Bafo. After years of friendship and informal "jamming" together at clubs and festivals, Madala Kunene and Syd Kitchen, two of South Africa's most enduring musical sons, joined forces in the creation of Bafo Bafo. This cross-cultural musical collaboration between two highly individual guitar stylists created a musical landscape that was absolutely unique, and culminated in the release of their only album together, "What Kind?". Bafo Bafo delivered a musical tapestry that was at once a living embodiment of the "new" South Africa, while their ability to naturally fuse cultural elements from the diversity abundant in multiethnic South Africa marked Bafo Bafo as a musical manifestation of the ethos behind the drive for Africa's renaissance.

=== Across ===
2007 saw Kitchen release what some call his finest album; Across consists of four long, solo acoustic guitar instrumentals named after the four elements, Earth, Air, Fire and Water, each of which references, if sometimes obliquely, the musical elements that have got him to this point.

=== Fool in a Bubble ===
In 2008 Brooklyn-based documentary filmmaker Joshua Sternlicht made a feature film on Kitchen, entitled Fool in a Bubble. Fool in a Bubble is the story of South African folk singer and poet Syd Kitchen, "as seen through the eyes of Sternlicht. Filmed in Durban and New York, the documentary premiered at the 2010 Durban International Film Festival. The film detailed Kitchen's life and music, in Durban and as he travelled to perform in New York, where he also recorded with Paul Simon's Graceland band. An album entitled "Fool in a Bubble" was released in conjunction with the film. Kitchen himself said of the film: " That is Josh Sternlicht's (Independent Filmmaker) take on my life. "

=== John Martyn Tribute Album ===
About the last musical adventure of Kitchen's life was travelling to Scotland to record a version of the John Martyn song, Fine Lines, along with members of Martyn's band Alan Thomson, Foster Paterson and his close friend Suzi Chunk for a Martyn tribute album destined to include a string of far better known artists than Kitchen himself. The tribute album featuring his cover of John Martyn's Fine Lines was released in 2011. The album also features The Cure's Robert Smith, David Gray, Beck, Paolo Nutini and Phil Collins doing covers of Martyn's work. Martyn himself was apparently well aware of and quite taken with Kitchen's output.

== Personal life ==
Kitchen, who taught guitar privately for years, went to university from which he emerged with BA (Music) and BA Honours degrees in musicology, both of which were awarded cum laude.

== Death ==
In March 2011 Kitchen was diagnosed with lung cancer and died soon afterwards. At the time of his death, there were a number of benefit concerts planned, featuring many of his collaborators. Kitchen was survived by his wife, Germaine, and two daughters, Sev and Jasmine.

In an interview with City Press shortly before his death, Kitchen said: "I've lived life, I'm proud of my credibility and what I've done – more than most my age. I've filled up three lifetimes in a way."
