= Miyela Afrika =

Studio album by Vusi Mahlasela
- Released: 2000

Vusi Mahlasela chronology
Silang Mabele (1997)	Miyela Afrika (2000)	Jungle of Questions (with the Proud Peoples Band) (2000)

Miyela Afrika is Vusi Mahlasela's fourth studio album.

== Track listing ==
1. "The Earth I Know is a Woman"
2. "Ingoma"
3. "Mme Motswadi"
4. "Miyela Afrika"
5. "A Proud People"
6. "Will You Have Time?"
7. "Amdokwe"
8. "Sipho Sami"
9. "Afrika Borwa"
10. "Ntate Mohapi"
11. "A Prayer for Our Time"
12. "Mama Bombay"
13. "Khelo Kha Magheshe"
14. "Emtini Wababe"
15. "Tsi Tsi"
