= Say Africa =

Studio album by Vusi Mahlasela
- Released: 2010
- Label: ATO Records
- Producer: Taj Mahal

Vusi Mahlasela chronology
| Guiding Star (2007) | Say Africa (2010) |

Say Africa is the seventh studio album by South African musician Vusi Mahlasela. The title song of the album "Say Africa" was originally written and performed by South African musician Dave Goldblum in 1997 and released on Dave's album Valley Road, however Dave receives little recognition for his work. The song was performed by Vusi Mahlasela at the opening of the 2010 FIFA World Cup, where Vusi gave full credit to Dave Goldblum for having written the song. However, the song is still publicly recognised as Vusi's own. The album was produced by Taj Mahal with the basic tracks were recorded in Dave Matthews' studio and completed in Johannesburg. Mahlasela performs duets with Taj Mahal and Angelique Kidjo on the album. Say Africa was released in South Africa in late 2010 and is scheduled for international release on 18 January 2011.

== Track listing ==
1. Say Africa
2. Woza
3. Re Yo Tshela Kae
4. Conjecture of the Hour
5. Umalume - Featuring JB Ntuli
6. Mokalanyane
7. In Anyway - Featuring Taj Mahal
8. Ode to Lesego
9. Vezubuhle
10. Nak Upenda Africa - Featuring Angelique Kidjo
11. Korodi
12. Ba Kae?
13. Naka Mokhura
14. Ntate Mandela
