= Silang Mabele =

Studio album by Vusi Mahlasela
- Released: 1997

Vusi Mahlasela chronology
Wisdom of Forgiveness (1994)	Silang Mabele (1997)	Miyela Afrika (2000)

Silang Mabele is Vusi Mahlasela's third album. The name Silang Mabele means "grinding the corn."

== Track listing ==
1. "Khunkhwane"
2. "Silang Mabele"
3. "Loneliness"
4. "Sleep Tight Margaret"
5. "Antone"
6. "Kwa-Zulu"
7. "Troubador"
8. "Africa is Dying"
9. "Smomothela"
10. "Love Prints"
11. "Ke Kgale"
12. "Kuyobanjani Na?"
13. "Voices"
14. "Weeping"
