= Guiding Star (2007 album) =

Naledi Ya Tsela

Studio album by Vusi Mahlasela
- Released: March 6, 2007
- Genre: World Music
- Length: 1:07:43
- Label: Mmino Wa Tshwane Music
- Producer: Lloyd Ross

Vusi Mahlasela chronology
Jungle of Questions (with the Proud Peoples Band) (2000)	Naledi Ya Tsela (2007)	Say Africa (2010)

Professional ratings
Review scores
Source	Rating
Allmusic	4.5/5 stars

Naledi Ya Tsela (Sesotho for Guiding Star, the title under which it is released internationally) is Vusi Mahlasela's sixth studio album. Songs on the album are sung in five languages: English, Sepedi, Sesotho, isiZulu, and seTswana. There also a number of guest singers, including Dave Matthews and Ladysmith Black Mambazo, and many other guest performers – whose contributions are not listed in the tracks only in the liner notes.

The album deals with a number of topics. For example, River of Jordan is about the death of his mother, and Song for Thandi is about the prominent Umkhonto we Sizwe (MK) guerrilla Thandi Modise.

== Track listing ==
1. "Jabula"
2. "Heaven in my Heart" (featuring Ladysmith Black Mambazo)
3. "Moleko"
4. "Chamber of Justice" (featuring Xavier Rudd)
5. "Tibidi Waka" (featuring Derek Trucks)
6. "Everytime" (featuring Jem)
7. "Sower of Words" (featuring Dave Matthews)
8. "Ntombi Mbali"
9. "River Jordan"
10. "Song for Thandi"
11. "Mighty River"
12. "Thula Mama"
13. "Our Sand"
14. "Tonti"
15. "Susana"
16. "Pata Pata" (Bonus Track)
