= Paul Erasmus =

South African Security Police officer

Paul Erasmus was a South African Security Police officer who testified to the Goldstone Commission, and later the Truth and Reconciliation Commission about police dirty tricks and violence during the apartheid era. This testimony revealed the existence of a unit in the Security Police called STRATCOM (Strategic Communications) that specialised in misinformation and propaganda against opponents of the regime. Erasmus also testified on the police efforts to discredit Winnie Madikizela-Mandela by spreading false rumours about sexual affairs and drug use.

Before joining STRATCOM, Erasmus had served in the counter-insurgency campaign in Namibia, as part of the Koevoet police unit.

== Trashing music industry ==
Erasmus appears in a documentary, Stopping the Music: the Roger Lucey Story, in which he explains Stratcom's campaign against South African folk rock guitarist Roger Lucey, which led to banning and disruption of gigs, confiscation of records, and an overzealous campaign against Lucey's label, Shifty Records, and the South African music industry in general. Erasmus's revelations were published in a biography, which was then extracted by an article in the Mail & Guardian.

== Torture as treatment ==
Erasmus was a feared interrogator. His methods of persuasion included burning, choking, beating, drowning, and administering electric shocks.

== Biography ==
Foot Soldier for Apartheid, an unpublished manuscript, has extracts available online.
