= The Silver Fez =

- DVD cover
- Directed by: Lloyd Ross
- Screenplay by: Rian Malan
- Produced by: Joëlle Chesselet
- Cinematography: Lloyd Ross
- Edited by: Lloyd Ross
- Music by: Warrick Sony
- Release date: 2009
- Running time: 83 minutes
- Country: South Africa

The Silver Fez is a 2009 South African documentary feature film directed by Lloyd Ross.

== Synopsis ==
The story tells of Kaatji Davids, a house painter who lives in Cape Town. He is very poor, with only an old banjo as a musical instrument, but he and a few close friends dream of beating the wealthy Hadji Bucks, undisputed champion of Cape Malay music. The prize is the Silver Fez, the "Holy Grail" of Cape Town's Islamic subculture. The contest involves thousands of musicians and a wide variety of tunes.

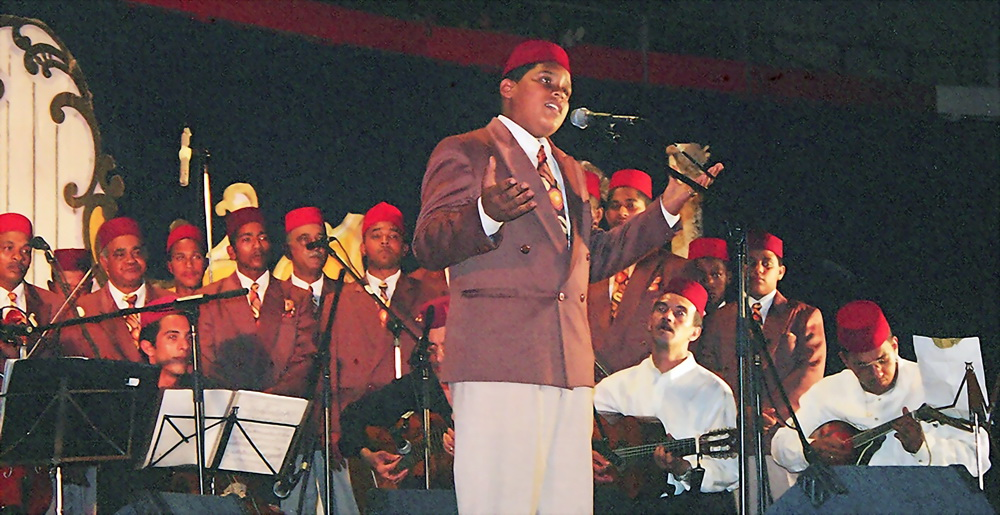
A Malay choir performs at a competition in the Good Hope Centre, Cape Town (2001)

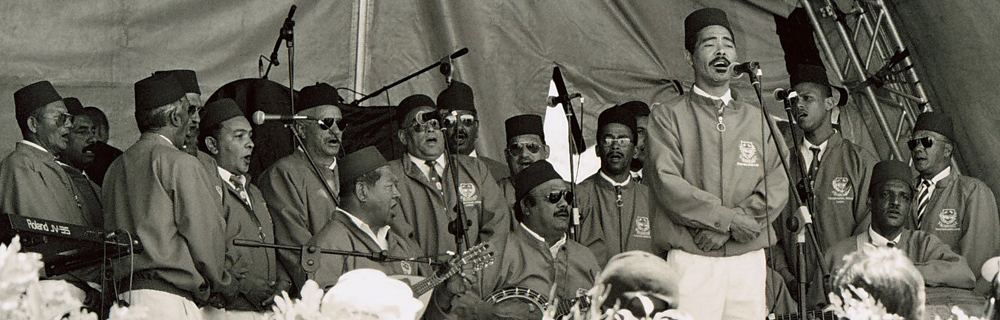
A Malay Choir performs at an ANC-sponsored ceremony in District Six, Cape Town (2001)

The Silver Fez (the name deriving from the fez, a type of felt hat worn by Malay men in the Cape) is a competition of all-male choirs from the Malay community.

== Background and themes ==
The film explores identity and marginalisation among the Cape Coloureds (of which the Cape Malays are a sub-group): the narrator, Mac, says: "You know, for my people, the so-called Cape coloureds of Cape Town, many of us feel like we are lost in a no-man’s-land between Europe and Asia, unsure of where we fit in". It also shows the feeling of belonging that the men have in the choirs.

The music originates from the days of slavery in South Africa, and the "Nederlandslied", a type of song that combines quarter-note vocal solos found in Arabic music with Western instrumental tunes. The lyrics have stayed the same.

== Production ==
The Silver Fez was directed by Lloyd Ross, who was a composer before moving into filmmaking. He founded the anti-apartheid record label Shifty Records in 1983, and then began making music videos for some of the musicians before starting to make documentary films in the mid 1990s.

The film, 83 minutes long, was made in colour using an HDCAM, and uses both the South African English and Afrikaans languages.

== Awards ==
The film was nominated for or won the following awards at various film festivals in 2009:

- Winner, Muhr AsiaAfrica Special Jury Prize, Dubai International Film Festival
- Nominee, Muhr AsiaAfrica Award, Dubai International Film Festival
- Winner, Best Documentary, Durban International Film Festival
- Winner, Best Documentary, Tri Continental Film Festival, Cape Town

In 2010, The Silver Fez was nominated for the Golden Horn for Best Documentary Feature at South African Film and Television Awards (SAFTA).
