= Ver van die Ou Kalahari =

Studio album by Koos Kombuis
- Released: 1987
- Genre: Rock
- Label: Shifty Records

Koos Kombuis chronology
| Ver van die Ou Kalahari (1987) | Niemandsland and Beyond (1990) |

Ver van die Ou Kalahari is the first full-length album by South African artist Koos Kombuis. It was released in 1987 by Shifty Records.

== Track listing ==
| No. | Title | Length |
|---|---|---|
| 1. | "Ontug In Die Lug" | 3:19 |
| 2. | "Elmarie" | 3:44 |
| 3. | "Swart Transvaal" | 5:07 |
| 4. | "Voedsel Vergiftiging" | 3:21 |
| 5. | "Lalie" | 3:31 |
| 6. | "Bar Op De Aar" | 3:57 |
| 7. | "Valerie" | 2:43 |
| 8. | "Ver Van Die Ou Kalahari" | 2:43 |
| 9. | "Coca Cola Nooi" | 5:10 |
| 10. | "Lady Van Die Bo Dorp" | 6:39 |
| 11. | "Boer In Beton" | 7:47 |
