= Don Clarke (songwriter) =

South African singer-songwriter

- Also known as: The Songteller
- Born: Johannesburg, South Africa
- Genres: World music, South African afro-pop, rock, folk
- Occupations: Singer-songwriter, composer, musician, producer
- Instrument: Guitar
- Label: Monkeyshine Music

Don Clarke (born 1955 in Johannesburg) is a South African singer-songwriter, also known as The Songteller. Clarke is notable for his music contribution to South African culture with songs that celebrate South African sport (Kick It Up), tell the story of heroes and support social issues (Zuma Must Fall).

His large music contribution to the South African film industry, including most of the Leon Schuster's films.

One of his early songwriting credits, Sanbonani, was a national hit record for P J Powers in 1986. The Long Walk is Over, an ode to Nelson Mandela (co-written with Kalla Bremer) won the Grand Prize in the Great American Song Contest in 2013, now part of the memorial collection held at the Nelson Mandela Centre of Memory Repository.

Promoting conservation in South Africa. Don is known for his sometimes controversial views on issues like poaching, hunting and politics. His music has been used by non-profits and in projects by John Varty, the conservationist.

Convening the Legends stage at South Africa's longest-running annual music festival, Splashy Fen.

== Biography ==
=== Early life ===
Born in Johannesburg in 1955, Don Clarke grew up in Westville, South Africa, outside Durban in Kwa-Zulu Natal. He learnt to play the guitar and wrote song lyrics from childhood. He started high school at Hilton College in 1969, but completed his education at Westville Boys' High School. On leaving school, he earned income writing adverting jingles.

=== Personal life ===
Don set up a music studio in Westville in 1979, and befriended a teenage Roy Ndlovu who ran errands. Roy died under strange circumstances in 1981. The song, Slowboats documents the story, with information provided by the artist.

He married business partner Denise Britz, dance choreographer known for the floorshow cabarets and supper club theatre at Durban's Ruby Tuesday, Millionaire's and The Wild Coast Sun. Don Clarke contributed original, often humorous songs to her risque dance routines. One, Jingle Bells- is seasonal uptake which has been updated over the years.

Don Clarke married Wendy Stacey in August, 2010. The couple live in Howick, in the KZN Midlands of South Africa. Wendy is a founding member of the Drakondale Girls' Choir School. The choir feature regularly in Don Clarke's recent music, notably on Till You're Free Again, the song written for the 2018 Leon Schuster film, Frank and Fearless. The film and the song both draw attention to the illegal trade in rhino horn.

=== Interests and projects ===
Don Clarke writes, records and produces music from his home studio in Howick. He is a conservationist, columnist for the Drakonteur, and supports local music. He and Dicky Roberts have convened the Legends of the Fen stage at Splashy Fen (South Africa's longest running music festival) since 2016. The initiative has seen South African legends like Steve Fataar, Brian Finch and PJ Powers return to the festival over recent years. He has recently finished writing his first book, Once Upon a Crutchmullet.He produces music through his studio, Monkeyshine Music, and is making a name for himself as a painter.

== Activism ==
=== Conservation ===
Don Clarke is public about his anti-hunting stance. He has a Facebook page called The Trophy Room and added his Mission Statement to his video channel under the song, Voortrekker Weep, dedicated to John Varty, South Africa's best known conservationist and wildlife film maker. The song protests the 2019 shooting of an iconic elephant in Namibia. John Varty credited Don Clarke with the music to his song, The Messiah - Greta Thunberg. It is performed by Don Clarke and Ru Nyathi and supports the controversial activist. The Clarke catalogue includes many songs that protest ecological issues, including You're Not Alone, another Varty dedication, and Roaring. In 2018, a rhino charity used Till You're Free Again without charge for promotional purposes.

=== Politics ===
Sanbonani was an anti-apartheid reconciliation song in 1986. Clarke has continuously spoken out publicly against corruption and inefficiency in the government through his column, vlogs and songs. EFF support for land expropriation triggered an Open Letter to Julius Malema, Clarke responded to the government lockdown measures with a series of Vlogs expressing his complaints and songs like Zuma Must Fall went viral after it was adopted by marching protesters. Mr Ramaphoza asks the new president not to "sell a lie for votes."

=== Social ===
South Africa is a multi-cultural society. Don Clarke works with local talent whenever collaboration is required and has written lyrics in multiple languages, like those written for Afrikaans singers like Laurika Rauch, Danie Niehaus, Leon Schuster and Rosie Doring. He recorded My Vok Maralise as his Afrikaans speaking alter ego, Donny the Dutchman. 1999, Don Clarke and Kala Bremer wrote the words and music for Die Nostalgie, a popular song (in Afrikaans) recorded by Laurika Rauch on her cd 19 Treffers in 21 Jaar. In 2015, a group of musicians from Durban united to record Dig a Little Deeper, a song about tackling xenophobia. The Long Walk is Over features Thembiso Sithole, Wendy Ndlovu Calvin Sthembiso & the Guns & Moses Choir, Underberg Primary School Choir, Rosa de Castro Doran, Callie Barrow, Derrik Swanepoel and Wendy Clarke. His recent song, A Virus and a Flower features jBoy, another local singer.

Much of his catalogue concerns social issues, like his latest release, A Sad, Sad Song which is about the recent COVID-19 lockdown.

== Songwriting ==
In 1986, Don Clarke's song "Sanbonani", performed by PJ Powers, won SABC's National Song Festival. He has produced a large body of work since then, and continues to write for artists, films and productions. He produces music and continues to perform.

== Adult Art - The Band Years ==
Adult Art, was formed in 1990, with Ronnie McNamara, Shaun Herbert, Wayne Rathbone, Gavin Bramley and Dave Atkinson. It was mainly a studio band, founded to record and promote the songs Don Clarke had written. Several of the band's songs appeared on the soundtrack for the 1991 Leon Schuster movie Sweet 'n Short. The band released three albums in the 1990s. including Acoustic Flush on the BMG Africa label in 1992. Adult Art disbanded in 1997, and reformed in 2010 under a new name, Crutchmullets

== Works ==
=== Track information below the table ===
Year	Film Title	Track	Credit
1989	Oh Schucks ... It's Schuster!	Music	Don Clarke
1990	Kwagga Strikes Back	Theme	Don Clarke
1991	Sweet 'n Short Soundtrack	Various	Clarke/Bremer Performed by Adult Art
2004	*Oh Schucks!...I'm Gatvol	Music	Clarke See * for tracklist and credits
2006	**Op Dun Eish!	Various	See ** for tracklist and credits
2008	Mr Bones 2 - Back from the Past	Various	See *** for tracklist and credits
2010	Schuks Tshabalala's Survival Guide to South Africa	Various	Crutch Mullets
2013	Schuks! Your Country Needs You	Music Supervisor	Don Clarke
2015	Schuks! Pay Back the Money	Film Music Credit	Don Clarke
2018	Frank and Fearless	Till You're Free Again	Don Clarke/Drakondale Girls' Choir

*Oh Schucks! I'm Gatvol Tracks and Credits : (lyrics: "Going Home", "Sanbonani", "Gatvol") / (music: "Going Home", "Sanbonani", "Naastin Theme", "Bakgatland", "Rambo Nation", "Gatvol", "Oh Schucks we wanna go Home", "Dig a Little Deeper", "I don't want to sit next to Manto") / (performer: "Going Home", "Sanbonani", "Naastin Theme", "Bakgatland", "Rambo Nation")

**Op Dun Eish Tracks and Credits : Hie Kommie Cheetahs (Don Clarke / Leon Schuster), Bielie Van 'n Mielie (Don Clarke / Leon Schuster/Mike Valentine), Steek Hom Innie Pad (Don Clarke / Leon Schuster/Mike Valentine), Dis Lekka by die A N See (Don Clarke / Leon Schuster/Mike Valentine), Eish Pt. 2 (Don Clarke / Leon Schuster), Hamba Polisiekar (Don Clarke / Leon Schuster), Vat Jou Goed en Rap (Don Clarke / Leon Schuster/Mike Valentine), Druk Jou Tswane In Jou Polokwane (Don Clarke / Leon Schuster/Mike Valentine), Kortbroek Kaskenades, Kortbroek Kaskenades (Don Clarke / Leon Schuster/Mike Valentine), Waars Daai Manne Nou (Don Clarke / Leon Schuster)

***Mr Bones 2 - Back from the Past Tracks and Credits : (lyrics: "Bombay Hunter - Main Theme", "Bombay Hunter - Helluva Man", "Bombay Hunter - Kwaito Version", "Chilli Man", "Mr Bones Love Song", "Rock 11") / (music: "Bombay Hunter - Main Theme", "Bombay Hunter - Helluva Man", "Bombay Hunter - Kwaito Version", "Rock 11") / (performer: "Bombay Hunter - Main Theme", "Bombay Hunter - Helluva Man", "Bombay Hunter - Kwaito Version", "Chilli Man", "Mr Bones Love Song", "Rock 11")

=== Track information below the table ===
Year	Title	Performed by	Composer / Artist	Album
1981	Slowboats	Don Clarke	Don Clarke	Single (digital)
1986	Sanbonani	P J Powers and Hotline	Don Clarke	Single
1994	Sanbonani	P J Powers and Hotline	Don Clarke	The Best of P J Powers and Hotline
1999	Die Nostalgie	Laurika Rauch	Don Clarke/Kalla Bremer	19 Treffers in 21 Jaar
2005	Grys Gebiede	Danie Niehaus	Don Clarke	Grys Gebiede
2010	Kick It Up	Crutch Mullets	Don Clarke	Soccer Safari
2010	Various (see* below)	Crutch Mullets	Don Clarke	Soccer Safari
2010	You're Not Alone	Don Clarke	Don Clarke	Digital
2011	Kick it Up	Leon Schuster	Clarke/Schuster	Bok Tjoppie (Op! Op! Op!)
2015	Roaring	Don Clarke	Don Clarke	Digital
2016	Zuma Must Fall	Don Clarke	Don Clarke and Special Care	Digital
2016	Die Nostalgie	Laurika Rauch	Clarke/Bremer	Die Troubadour -Bring Hulde Aan
2017	Long Dark Journey	Don Clarke	Don Clarke	Digital
2017	Tell the World	Don Clarke	Don Clarke	Digital
2017	Land of Nelson	Don Clarke	Don Clarke	Digital
2017	White Man Crying	Don Clarke	Don Clarke	Digital
2017	Jingle Bells Revisited	Rosie Doring	Don Clarke	Digital
2018	One More Day	Don Clarke	Don Clarke	Digital
2018	The Best Way Back	Don Clarke ft Dicky Roberts	Don Clarke	Digital
2018	Zuma Has Fallen	Don Clarke ft Special Care	Don Clarke	Digital
2018	Mr Ramaphoza	Don Clarke	Don Clarke	Digital
2019	The Messiah	Don Clarke and Ru Nyathi	Lyrics Varty, music Clarke	Digital
2019	Hey, Bokke!	Leon Schuster with Drakondale Girls' & Michaelhouse	Schuster / Clarke	Digital / Monkeyshine Music
2019	Voortrekker Weep	Don Clarke	Don Clarke	Digital
2019	Do You Ever Cry?	Don Clarke	Don Clarke	Single
2020	Virus and a Flower	Don Clarke and jBoy	Don Clarke	Lockdown Blues
2020	A Sad, Sad Song	Don Clarke	Don Clarke	Digital

=== 2010 Soccer Safari Album Information ===
Written by Don Clarke, performed by Crutchmullets unless otherwise stated

Tracklist: Kick it Up, Hey-Na Africa, Run for Cover, Khuthela Bo! (ft Leon Schuster), Vuvuzela Mamba (ft Alf "Shorty" Ntombela), Gig a Little Deeper, Siyabonga, Nkosi Sikilele Vuvuzela, Webabo, F For Woodwork (ft Alf "Shorty" Ntombela), Sinamandla, Keeper, Khuthala Bo! (Afrohouse Remix), We're All In Pain.

== Selected songwriting credits and awards ==
Year	Song	Notes
1986	Sanbonani	National Song for South Africa Competition winner
1999	Sanbonani	USA Songwriter Competition (honourable mention)
2008	Hey-Na	Splashy Fen Song Winner
2010	Kick it Up!	SABC FIFA World Cup 2010 Bafana song competition
2013	Long Walk is Over	Great American Song Contest Grand Prize winner (with Kalla Bremer)
2016	Blame it on the Whites	Song went viral
2018	'Till You're Free Again	Great American Song Contest 1st Place, Category Special - Anti Poaching
2020	Zuma Must Fall	Written with Special Care/Thembiso Sithole- Viral election song
