= Live at the Bassline =

Live album by Vusi Mahlasela/Louis Mhlanga
- Released: 1999

Live at the Bassline is a live album by Vusi Mahlasela and Louis Mhlanga.

== Track listing ==
1. "Ubuhle Bomhlaba"
2. "Two Birds"
3. "Silang Mabele"
4. "Zvinoshamisa"
5. "When You Come Back"
6. "Fountain"
7. "Basimanyana"
8. "Tontobane"
9. "Mai Rugare"
10. "Untitled"
11. "Chibona"
12. "Red Song"
13. "Woza"
