= Shifty Records =

Shifty Records was a South African anti-apartheid record label founded by Lloyd Ross and Ivan Kadey in 1982/83, which existed for around ten years.

== History ==
Lloyd Ross and Ivan Kadey founded Shifty Records in 1983 but Kontaktnätet, a Swedish non-governmental cultural organization, financially supported Shifty Records from 1986 to 1990. Kontaktnätet hosted and held various events in Sweden for the company and the various artists associated with Shifty Records, while also investing in recording equipment for the musicians, and then moved into documentary filmmaking in the mid-1990s, including the award-winning feature film The Silver Fez (2009).

== Description ==
Shifty Records aimed at providing a platform for independent music with a social message, Shifty was an outlet for South African musicians opposed to apartheid. As a result, Shifty struggled to gain exposure on the radio stations of the Broederbond-controlled South African Broadcasting Corporation. Its anti-establishment stance was appealing to young and politically marginalised South Africans as seen in the success of Mzwakhe Mbuli's unadvertised album Change is Pain which went gold despite being banned by the apartheid regime.

== Significance ==
The label helped establish boerepunk and the alternative Afrikaans genre at a time when it was a reflex to stereotype all Afrikaners as supporters of the National Party. Operating from a caravan hitched to a Ford V6 truck, the Shifty studio produced an album every two months until 1993.

== Apartheid security campaign against Shifty (2002) ==
In 2002, notorious Bureau of State Security agent, Paul Erasmus, was granted amnesty by the Truth & Reconciliation Commission for his overzealous campaign against Shifty Records artist, Roger Lucey, a campaign which ended his career. The scope of the amnesty application does not extend to other artists associated with Lucey or the Shifty label. In particular, Lucey's work can be found on Shifty compilation albums such as Forces Favourites and Anaartjie in our Sosatie. Erasmus, as indicated in his biography, claimed to have waged a total war against the music industry. He is also one of Lucey's biggest fans, even going as far as seizing most of his albums from record stores. The entirety of this incident has been documented in the book “Stopping the Music”: The Roger Lucey Story.

== Artists ==
Shifty Records frequently utilized a core group of versatile musicians, who contributed their instrumental talents to various artists' recordings as support instrumentalists, e.g. drummer Ian Herman and trombonist Jannie "Hanepoot" van Tonder who can both be heard on many albums from the Shifty Catalogue.

Artists appearing on the label included:

- Vusi Mahlasela
- Mzwakhe Mbuli
- Koos Kombuis
- The Genuines
- FOSATU Workers Choirs
- Isja
- James Phillips & The Cherry Faced Lurchers
- Bernoldus Niemand en Die Swart Gevaar, AKA James Phillips
- Corporal Punishment
- Jennifer Ferguson
- Johannes Kerkorrel
- Kalahari Surfers
- National Wake
- Noise Khanyile
- Roger Lucey
- Sankomota
- Simba Morri
- Tananas
- Lesego Rampolokeng
- Happy Ships
- Winston's Jive Mixup
- Robin Auld
- KOOS

== See also ==
- List of record labels
- Artists United Against Apartheid
- Market Theatre (Johannesburg)
- Music of South Africa
- Recommended Records and Rock in Opposition
- United Democratic Front
- The Voëlvry Movement
