= The Voice (Vusi Mahlasela album) =

Compilation album by Vusi Mahlasela
- Released: 2003

The Voice is a 'best of' compilation of tracks from all five of Vusi Mahlasela's previous studio albums.

== Track listing ==
1. "Melodi Ya Mamelodi"
2. "Silang Mabele"
3. "When You Come Back"
4. "Weeping"
5. "Sleep Tight Margaret"
6. "Red Song"
7. "Troubadour"
8. "Emtini Wababe"
9. "Fountain"
10. "Untitled"
11. "Mma Modiane"
12. "Loneliness"
13. "Ntate Mahlasela"
14. "A Prayer for Our Time"
