= Gito Baloi =

Mozambican musician (1964–2004)

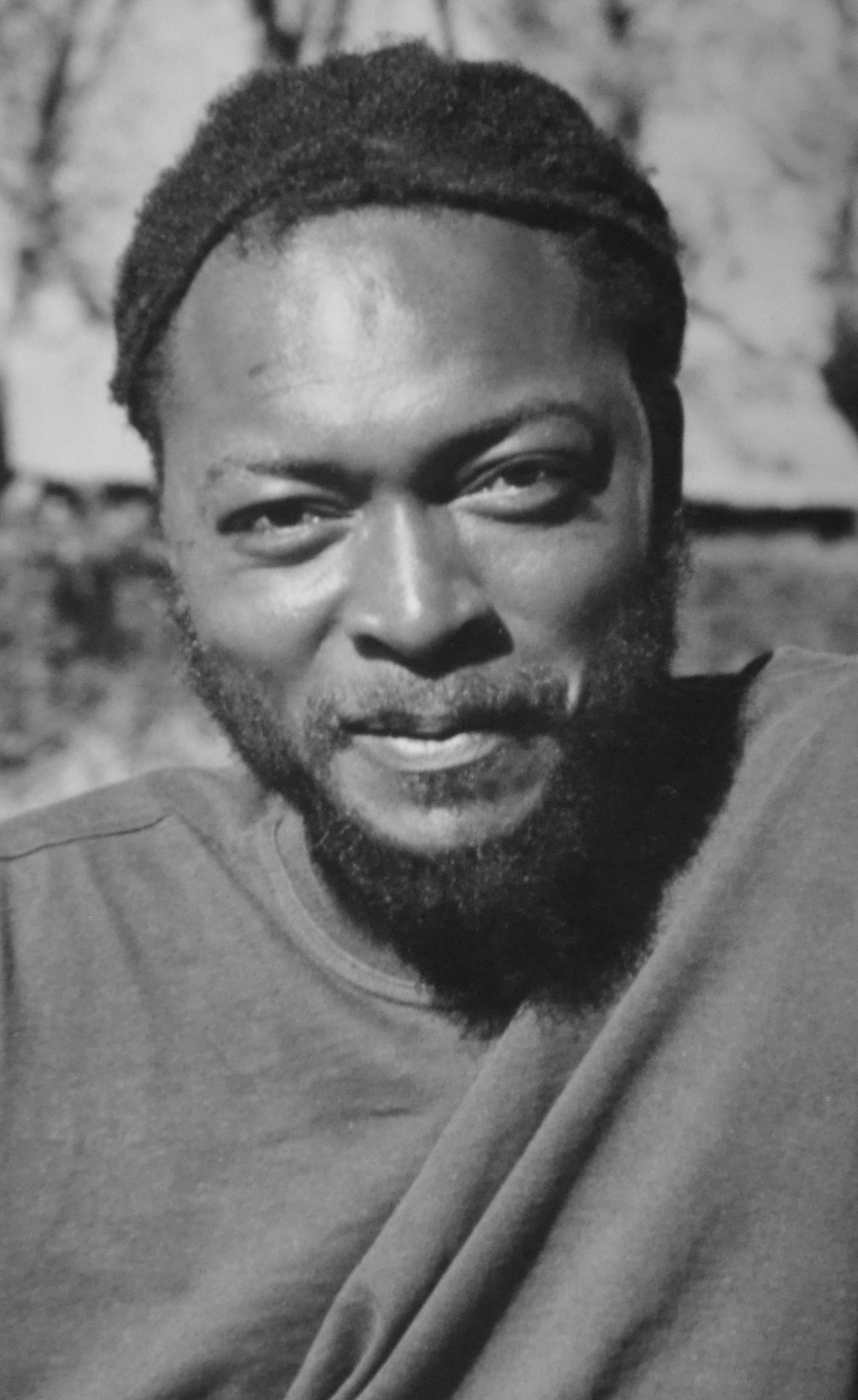
- Gito Baloi
- Born: Felix Garcao do Rosario Serafim Bernardo Baloi; 30 September 1964; Matola, Mozambique
- Died: 4 April 2004 (aged 39); Johannesburg, South Africa
- Occupation: Recording artist
- Years active: 1976–2004
- Spouse: Erika Hibbert
- Children: 2 daughters
- Musical career
- Genres: Jazz, jazz fusion, reggae, Marrabenta, Mbaqanga
- Instruments: Vocals, guitar
- Labels: Gallo, Shifty records
- Member of: Tananas

Gito Baloi (September 30, 1964 – April 4, 2004) was a Mozambican musician. Originally known for his collaborations and as a member of the trio Tananas, he also released solo albums as vocalist and bassist: "Ekhaya" (1995), “Na Ku Randza" (1997), "Herbs & Roots" (2003) and the posthumously-released "Beyond" (2008).

Known for his vocal work and lead bass style, Baloi became a notable contributor to African jazz and as one of the most respected guitarists. He performed widely in Southern Africa.

== Early life ==
Felix Garcao do Rosario Serafim Bernardo Baloi, better known by his nickname "Gito", was born in Matola, Mozambique. He grew up on his family's farm, near Maputo, with his mother, father, and siblings. He was the oldest son. Gito was a musical child; he taught himself how to play music, building his own instruments out of discarded paraffin tins, oil drums and reeds. His early influences included Jaco Pastorius and Bob Marley. At 14, he borrowed a bass guitar and performed for the villagers to help support his family. As a teenager, Gito left home to avoid being forced to fight in the civil war. On foot, he headed for South Africa with a few friends.

== Music career ==
Before his death, Gito had traveled extensively, working with a numerous musicians locally and internationally. Starting out in South Africa, Gito toured with a group called Pongolo during 1986. In 1987, Tananas was formed by Gito, Ian Herman and Steve Newman. The band gained global attention, leading them to perform in America, Australia, France, Japan, Sweden and various other countries around the world. On separate occasions, he shared the stage with Paul Simon of Simon & Garfunkel, Peter Gabriel of Genesis, Sting of The Police, as well as Phil Manzanera, Tracy Chapman and Youssou N'Dour.

Gito worked with Jason Armstrong in 1996 and 2000 on two albums, Desert Voices, and played bass in the band Somewhere Else along with Armstrong (keyboards), George Sunday (guitar) and Gaston Goliath (drums) during 1993.

One particular project he was involved with was The Shuttle Band, which featured musicians from Europe and South Africa. He was also a part of world music group Mondetta, consisting of artists from Israel, Canada, Korea and South Africa.

Baloi sang vocals for the song "Mountain Wind" on the album "Bush Telegraph" by Landscape Prayers, and was also credited on the album for production and mixing. In 2004, Baloi recorded "Sweet-Thorn", a duo album with Landscape Prayers guitarist, Nibs van der Spuy.

In 2008, "Beyond", a posthumous album, was released, with a percentage of its proceeds going to the Gito Baloi Memorial Trust, which was set up for Baloi's children. Gito had begun recording the 10 tracks and the production was completed by Steve Newman (Tananas), Paul Hanmer, Ian Herman (Tananas), McCoy Mrubata, Moses Khumalo, Pedro Da Silva Pinto (340ml), Tlale Makhene, Tony Cox, Frank Paco, Nibs van der Spuy, Deepak Ram, Rui Soeiro (340ml), Bernice Boikanyo, Paulo Chibanga (340ml), Thuli Mdlalose, Eliot Short, Vusi Maseko, Graeme Sacks and Dave Reynolds.

== Personal life ==
Gito was married to South African visual artist, Erika Hibbert. They have two daughters together - Lorha, born in 1996, and Tiva, 1997.

== Death ==
Gito was shot dead in Johannesburg, South Africa on April 4, 2004 while on his way home from a concert in Pretoria, leaving behind 2 young kids and his wife. He was 39 years old.

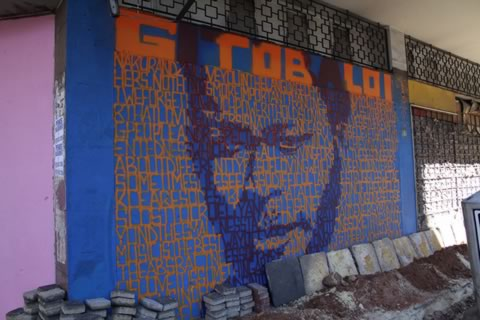
A memorial mural of Baloi by Breeze Yoko on Nugget Street - the site of Baloi's death.

== See also ==
- Shifty Records

== Sources ==
- The Dead Rock Stars Club
