= Jennifer Ferguson =

South African singer-songwriter

- Origin: South Africa
- Genres: Political music, Cabaret
- Occupation(s): Singer-songwriter, Political activist, Former Member of Parliament
- Years active: 1980s–present
- Labels: Shifty Records

Jennifer Ferguson is a South African singer-songwriter and political activist, and former member of Parliament for the African National Congress in South Africa. She recorded her first two albums of music through Shifty Records and was part of a burgeoning political music, theatre and cabaret scene in Johannesburg during the late 1980s.

A 2007 book described her songs as being "about the insanity of racism and war and the importance of humanity, peace and harmony".

Under Apartheid, Ferguson was known for her blatant support for the then-banned ANC from the stage, which saw her targeted by security police. In one instance government agents, using tickets bought with state funds, disrupted one of her concerts by releasing tear gas in a theatre.

In 1997 Ferguson resigned from Parliament and started to split her time between South Africa and Sweden. Shortly before, she had abstained on a vote about abortion, despite party orders to vote in favour of it or stay away on the day of the sitting.

In October 2017 Ferguson accused football administrator and politician Danny Jordaan of raping her 24 years before. She said the #MeToo campaign had inspired her to speak out. Jordaan denied the allegation.

In March 2018 Ferguson laid a charge of rape against Jordaan and said she expected more women to come forward about assault by Jordaan. Jordaan claimed that the criminal charges had been catalysed by his professional rival Irvin Khoza, and said Khoza had paid for Ferguson's flight to South Africa to lay the complaint. Khoza denied this, Ferguson produced documents to the contrary, and leaked evidence of Khoza's purported involvement was reported to have had "worrying discrepancies".
