= When You Come Back (song) =

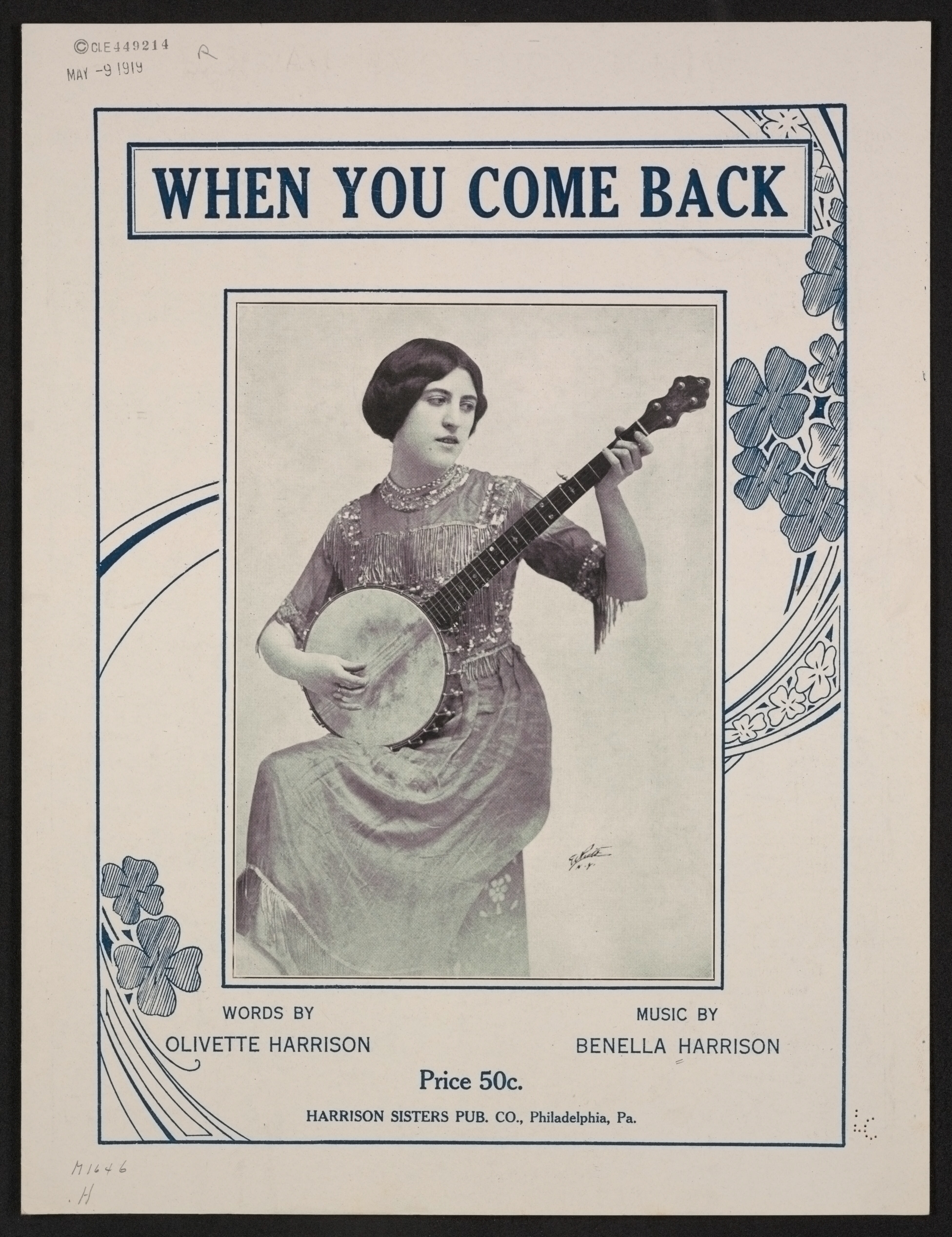

Song
- Released: 1919
- Genre: War-time song
- Composer(s): Bennella Harrison
- Lyricist(s): Olivette Harrison

"When You Come Back" is a World War I song released in 1919.

== Harrison Sisters ==
The song was written by the Harrison sisters. Olivette Harrison wrote the lyrics, and Bennella Harrison composed the music. The song was produced by the Harrison Sisters Publishing Company in Philadelphia, Pennsylvania It was written for both voice and piano.

The song is written in first person from the point of view of a woman waiting for a man in her life, who has gone to war. She describes herself as feeling lonely and that the hours are long without him near. In the chorus, the narrator questions how things will be when this man returns.

When you come back, dear
will you come to me?
And take me in your arms before you cross'd the sea?
I'm still waiting
and my head is in a whirl
I wonder if when you return
you will call me your own little girl.

== John McCormack ==
The song was performed by John McCormack, and reached the number four spot on the US song charts of May 1919. It was released under the Victor record label.
