= The Voëlvry Movement =

Afrikaans alternate music scene in the final years of Apartheid

The Voëlvry movement (Afrikaans: [ˈfuəlfrəi]) in South Africa was a genre of anti-apartheid music sung in Afrikaans. The term Voëlvry means both "free as a bird" and "outlaw". This movement has been said to have started on April 4, 1989 in Johannesburg in a packed club. This marked the beginning of what some have called a rock and roll uprising. The Voëlvry movement used music in the Afrikaans language to show pride. The movement focused on Afrikaner youth. The main goal of the movement was to get Afrikaner youth to see the changes that had to occur in the “authoritarian, patriarchal culture”.

== Etymology ==
In the context of colonial/frontier South Africa, the term "voëlvry" acquired the connotation of "gone native" as a betrayal of settler solidarity; somebody so classified could be seen as a "volksverraaier" (traitor to the nation) having no more protection under law than a mere wild bird.

== History ==
South Africa (assembled from a set of racist colonies) lived from 1948 under Apartheid— extreme separation of races enforced by law. "Non-white races" were barred from political office or even removed from the country. Uprising and protests increased in number and led to major anti-apartheid movements. One of these movements, in 1989, was called the Voëlvry movement.

The prehistory of the Voëlvry movement started in the 1980s with the opening of Shifty Mobile Recording Studio. Started by Lloyd Ross, this company began playing Afrikaans rock music, but it was too early for wide acceptance. Shifty Records asked three major questions when looking at music to accept: is it original? Is it quality music? And does it allow for growth in South Africa’s music development? This led Ross to allow music that was angry and music that directly sang in response to Apartheid. Ross was quoted as saying, “But I am not a movement type of guy and never joined any political party or organization. What fascinated me was the culture coming out of it. That’s what I wanted to capture”.

Ralph Rabie, under the stage name Johannes Kerkorrel, was a major force in the movement. Rabie used this name as a stage name to mock the Dutch Reformed Church. (Johannes Kerkorrel is the trademark of a Dutch organ.) Other musicians, such as Koos Kombuis, James Phillips (also performing under the name Bernoldus Niemand), and Karla Krimpelien were prominent in the movement.

== Concerts: The tour ==
The tour focused on getting South African youth to understand issues going on in the government. Major surveillance and threats from police sparked trouble at the beginning of the tour. This created issues over suitable venues to host the tour. The tour tried to get into University venues, but was banned from most and not allowed to perform because the "offensive language by the bands ran counter to the refined art of academic debate." Instead, the tour played in abandoned buildings.

During the tour, media coverage was negative. The media claimed that the tour's song lyrics were naïve. Kerkorrel later said that, "They obviously don't realize that our whole idea is to write naïve lyrics. We are liberating the language. If you can make a language into rock and roll, it can't be an oppressive language anymore." The musicians used rock and roll music to represent traditional Afrikaans songs and symbols. Songs in the movement portrayed basic symbols that were important in South Africa—re-purposing them to represent their message. For example, in the song, Ossewa (Oxwagon), the standard symbol of the oxwagon was changed to a car and helped to lead Afrikaners out of political turmoil and into the future.
