= Daniel Hugo =

South African radio announcer and producer

Dr. Daniel Hugo (born 26 February 1955 in Stellenbosch, South Africa) is a poet, translator, compiler and editor. He worked a specialist announcer / producer for Radiosondergrense, the national Afrikaans radio service, and was also responsible for the literary programmes "Leeskring" and "Vers en Klank". He is an editor at the publishing house Protea Boekhuis.

Daniel Hugo has a B.A. Honours degree (Afrikaans and Dutch) from the University of Stellenbosch and later did his master's degree at the University of Pretoria. Between 1980 and 1988 he worked as a lecturer of Afrikaans and Dutch at the University of the Free State. During 1983 he studied at the Catholic University Leuven in Belgium. He was awarded his doctorate in 1989 for his thesis "Afrikaans poetry of wit".

Daniel Hugo has written 14 poetry albums, the latest "Hanekraai" in 2012, and has also compiled numerous collections of poetry and short stories. He has translated several books by the following writers from Dutch to Afrikaans including Tom Lanoye, Herman de Coninck, Harry Mulisch, Herman van Veen, Karel Glastra van Loon and David van Reybrouck.

He is married to journalist Marlene Malan and lives in Prince Albert, South Africa.

== Compilations ==
- 2004 - Land van sonlig en van sterre – gedigte oor Namibië. Protea Boekhuis (Pretoria).
- 2004 - Liefde, natuurlik – liefdesverhale (saam met Carina Diedericks-Hugo). LAPA Uitgewers (Pretoria)
- 2003 - Ina Rousseau: Die stil middelpunt. Human & Rousseau (Kaapstad).
- 2002 - Tydskrif II. 'n Herontmoeting met vroeë Afrikaanse kortverhaalskrywers. LAPA Uitgewers (Pretoria).
- 2001 - Tydskrif. 'n Herontmoeting met vroeë Afrikaanse kortverhaalskrywers. LAPA Uitgewers (Pretoria).
- 2000 - Nuwe Verset (saam met Phil du Plessis & Leon Rousseau). Protea Boekhuis (Pretoria).
- 1999 - Lyflied. 'n Keur uit die liedtekste van Hennie Aucamp. Tafelberg Uitgewers (Kaapstad).
- 1996 - P.J. Philander: 'n keur uit sy gedigte. Tafelberg Uitgewers (Kaapstad).
- 1994 - Olga Kirsch: Nou spreek ek weer bekendes aan. 'n Keur 1944–1983. Human en Rousseau (Kaapstad).
- 1993 - Storie-konsertina, humorverhale van A.A.J. van Niekerk. Tafelberg Uitgewers (Kaapstad).
- 1989 - Miskien sal ek die wingerd prys; ryme en gedigte oor wyn en sterk drank (saam met Etienne van Heerden) Tafelberg Uitgewers (Kaapstad).
- 1988 - Speelse verse. Tafelberg Uitgewers (Kaapstad).

== Translations from Dutch ==
- 2015 - Leonard Nolens: 'n Digter in Antwerpen. Protea Boekehuis (Pretoria)
- 2008 - Tom Lanoye: 'n Slagterseun met 'n brilletjie. Protea Boekhuis (Pretoria).
- 2005 - Gerrit Komrij: Die elektries gelaaide hand. Protea Boekhuis (Pretoria).
- 2003 - David van Reybrouck: Die plaag. Protea Boekhuis (Pretoria).
- 2002 - Karel Glastra van Loon: Passievrug. Queillerie (Kaapstad)
- 2000 - Herman van Veen: Verhale. Queillerie (Kaapstad)
- 1999 - Harry Mulisch: Die aanslag. Queillerie (Kaapstad)
- 1997 - Herman van Veen: 'n Teer gevoel (op CD) (liedtekste)
- 1997 - Vandeputte, O. Nederlands. Die Taal van twintig miljoen Nederlanders en Vlaminge. Stichting Ons Erfdeel, Rekkem.
- 1996 - Tom Lanoye: Kartondose. Queillerie (Kaapstad)
- 1996 - Herman de Coninck: Liefde, miskien. Queillerie (Kaapstad)
- 1996 - Herman van Veen: Op pad huis toe. Harlekijn Holland (Leersum)

== Translations from English ==
- 2005 – Cicely Mary Barker: Die blommefeetjies. Human & Rousseau (Kaapstad)

== Awards ==
- 2008 - ATKV-radioprys vir onderhoud op die program Leeskring (RSG).
- 2004 – Via Afrika Book Journalist of the Year.
- 2003 – ATKV-radioprys vir beste onderhoud.
- 2002 – ATKV-radioprys vir beste onderhoud.
- 2001 – ATKV-radioprys vir beste omroeper.
- 2001 – ATKV-radioprys vir 'n hoorbeeld oor die skrywer, Jan Rabie.
- 1999 – ATKV-radioprys vir Die Verste Reis, 'n hoorbeeld oor die skryfster Elsa Joubert.
- 1998 – Akademieprys vir hoorbeelde vir die dokumentêre program oor die digter Uys Krige.
- 1996 – ATKV-radioprys vir 'n dokumentêre program oor die digter P.J. Philander.
- 1995 – Radio Artes-toekenning vir die poësieprogram Versalbum: die verskeidenheid van Afrikaans.
- 1995 – ATKV-radioprys vir die poësieprogram Versalbum: die verskeidenheid van Afrikaans.
- 1993 – ATKV-radioprys vir So is die lewe vir een pond sewe – 'n hoorbeeld oor R.K. Belcher.
- 1993 – Radio Artes-toekenning vir So is die lewe vir een pond sewe – 'n hoorbeeld oor R.K. Belcher.
- 1992 – ATKV-radioprys vir die dokumentêre programme Audrey Blignault en Sestig is Dertig.
