= Mark Schonau =

Mark Schonau (August 23, 1962 – October 6, 2024) was an internationally travelled busker and a well known and loved 'Maritzburg resident who played for the Hairy Legged Lentil Eaters, a folk band that kept the town entertained for 28 years.

Schonau was born in Pietermaritzburg, attended Pelham Primary School, Alexandra High School, trained as a history teacher, switched to music teaching and then (in 1988), began a career as a full-time fiddler, playing on a variety of occasions. Long before the "busking economy" emerged as a means to gain influence and fame on Instagram, Mark made a living from playing his violin at the Pietermaritzburg Royal Agricultural Show, Hilton Arts Festival and Art in the Park. His reputation as an entertainer led him to international events in Scotland, Dublin and Spain. For Schonau, busking was a way to radiate his passion for people and for music.
