= When You Come Back (album) =

Studio album by Vusi Mahlasela
- Released: 1992

Vusi Mahlasela chronology
When You Come Back (1992)	Wisdom of Forgiveness (1994)

When You Come Back is Vusi Mahlasela's debut album.

== Track listing ==
1. "When You Come Back"
2. "Melodi Ya Mamelodi"
3. "Manana"
4. "Tonkana"
5. "Epitoli"
6. "Gijimane Masotsha"
7. "Hello Mams"
8. "In Solitary Confinement"
9. "Red Song"
10. "Vision"
11. "Untitled"
12. "Mayibuye"

== FIFA World Cup 2010 ==
"When You Come Back" was used as the main theme song for UK broadcaster ITV's coverage of the FIFA World Cup 2010. Parts of the song are played with an image of liquid gold forming the trophy and the shape of the African Continent. The song entered the UK Official Singles Chart on 4 July 2010 at #70.
