= Madala Kunene =

South African musician (born 1951)

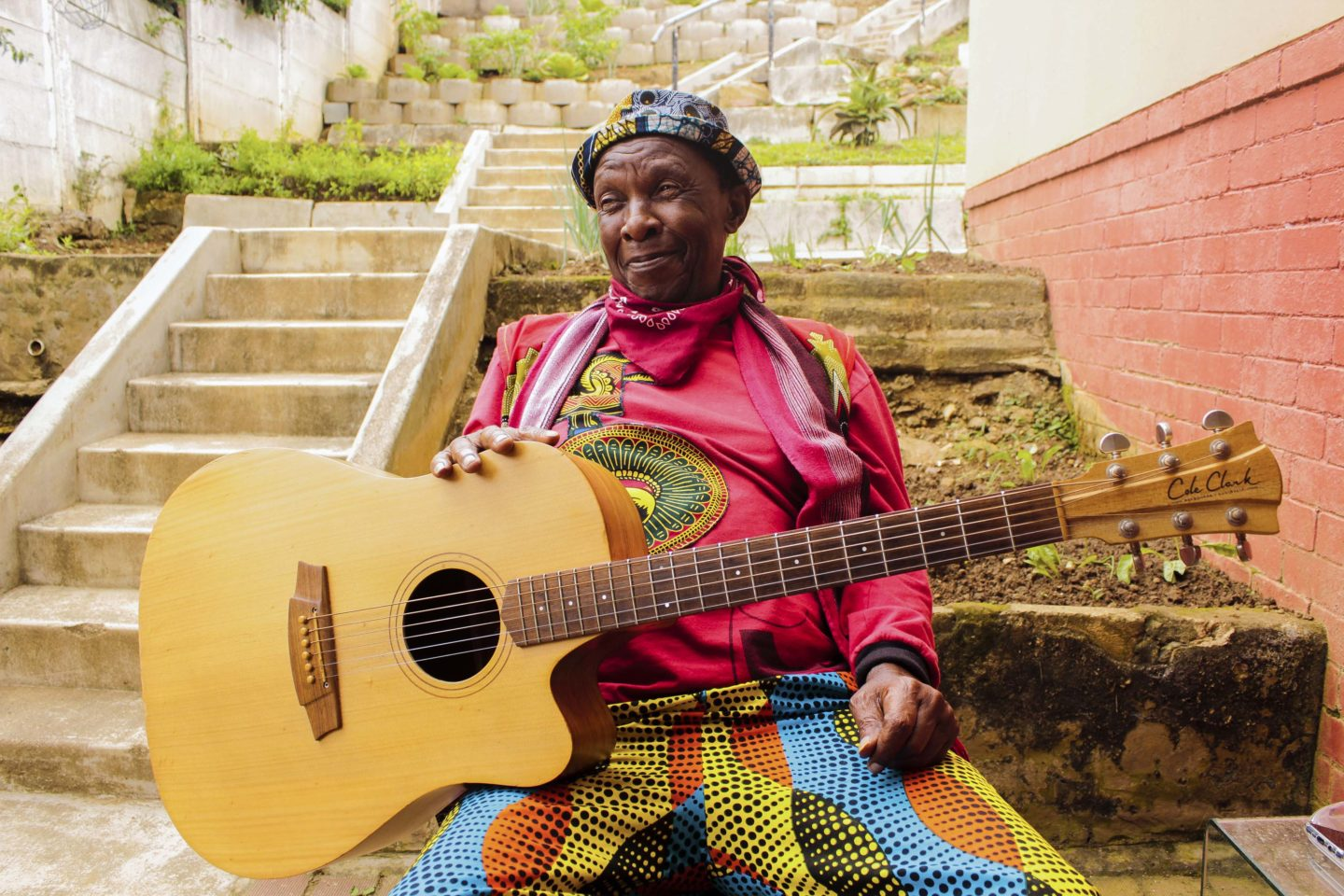
- Kunene in 2021

Background information
- Born: April 17, 1951 (age 74)
- Genres: Jazz fusion, world
- Occupations: Record producer, singer, guitarist
- Years active: 1970–present

Affectionately known as "Bafo", Madala Kunene (born 17 April 1951) is a South African musician born in Kwa-Mashu, near Durban. Kunene started busking on Durban’s beach-front at the age of 7, making his first guitar out of a cooking oil tin and fish gut for the strings, soon becoming a popular performer in the townships.

== Biography ==
Madala Kunene has recorded and collaborated with a host of artists namely Guy Buttery, Max Lässer, Debashish Bhattacharya, Steve Newman, Zawadi Yamungu, Mthuthu Ndebele, Baba Mokoena Serakong, Busi Mhlongo, Mabi Thobejane, The Forest Jam Band, Matthias Abaecherli, Carlo Menet, Jose Neto, Themba Mokoena, Changuito,Syd Kitchen, Madosini, Airto Moreira, Flora Purim and many others.

== Discography ==
- Madala Kunene (1990)
- Outernational Meltdown – Healers Brew Compilation (1995)
- Outernational Meltdown – Free At Last Compilation (1995)
- King Of The Zulu Guitar Live Vol. 1 (1995)
- Kon'Ko Man (1996)
- Outernational Meltdown / Madala – Music With No Name (12") (1996)
- Freedom Countdown – Compilation (1996)
- Madala Kunene & Max Lässer – Madamax (1998)
- Oppikoppi – Bushveld Blast Live '98 – Various Artists Compilation (1998)
- Madala Kunene & Bernard Mndaweni – Uxolo (2005)
- Madala Kunene & Syd Kitchen – Bafo Bafo (2005)
- African Classics - King Of The Zulu Guitar – Compilation (2008)
- Madala Kunene & Baba Mokoena Serakoeng – First Double 1 & 2
- 1959 (2015)
- Khaya Records 7" Series Vol. III – with Guy Buttery (2017)
- Madala Kunene & Forest Jam - bafo The Mentor (2018)
- Madala Kunene & Themba Mokoena – Durban Poison - At Last! (2019)
- Madal KuneneLive & Mabi Gabriel Thobejane - Live @ 2018 NAF Grahamstown (2023)
- Konko Man Version2 - Live at Westville Theatre Club - with Guy Buttery (2023)
- Madala Kunene - Remixes 2023 Episode One (Remixers Syost, Black Motion, Deeper Kings,3Rio Symphony, OddXperienc, Guy Buttery)
- Madala Kunene - Remixes 2023 Episode Two (Remixer Zee Da Pro feat Hugh Masekela)
- Madala Kunene & Sibusile Xaba - kwaNTU 2025
