= Steve Newman (musician) =

South African musician

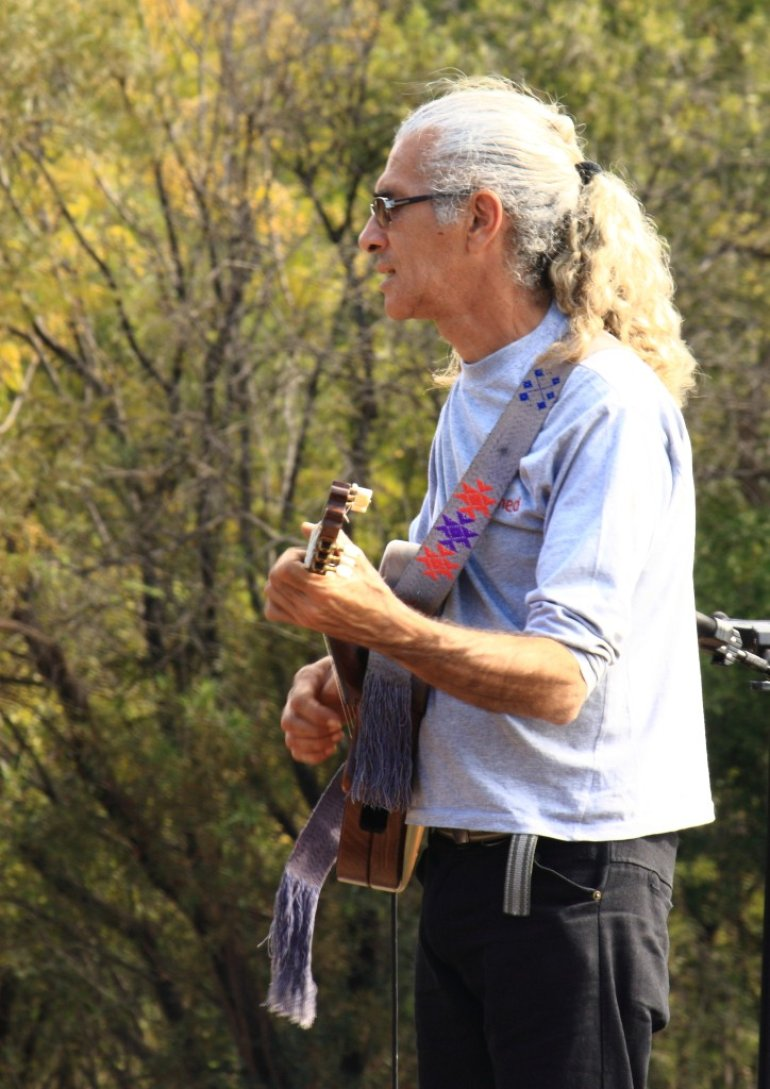
Steve Newman on stage at the 2010 Solstice Beer Festival in Broederstroom, South Africa

Steve Newman is a South African acoustic guitarist and a founding member of the group Tananas. For thirty years Newman has been collaborating with fellow South African guitarist, Tony Cox. He is also one of The Aquarian Quartet, consisting of Tony Cox, Syd Kitchen (deceased 2011), Greg Georgiades and Steve Newman. He was a member of Mondetta, a self-described world music group, with Gito Baloi (of Tananas) and Wendy Oldfield.

== Discography ==
As Steve Newman

- Your Mother is Very Worried About You (1979) — out of print LP
- What Do You Want (1982) — solo and with Tony Cox; out of print LP
- 101 Ways to Play the Acoustic Guitar (1983) with Tony Cox — out of print LP
- Man on the Jetty (1985) — out of print cassette (solo), recorded at Pearl Road Studios, London, by Doc Rowe
- Tananas (1986) with Kathryn Locke — out of print cassette
- Planetarium Live (c. 1989) with Tony Cox — out of print cassette
- Alive at La Plaza (1993) with Tony Cox — out of print cassette
- About Time (2002) with Tony Cox
- Steve Newman (2004) — solo independent release
- The World in a Guitar (2004) with Aquarian Quartet & friends (Madala Kunene, Terence Scarr, Edi Nedilander, Ashish Joshi, Kesivan Naidoo, Errol Dyers)
- Flavour (2008) — solo

With Tananas

- Tananas (1989)
- Spiral (1990)
- Time (1992)
- Orchestra Mundo (1995)
- Unamunacua (1996)
- The Collection (1997)
- Seed (1999)
- Alive in Jo'burg (2001)
