= Louis Mhlanga =

Zimbabwean guitarist

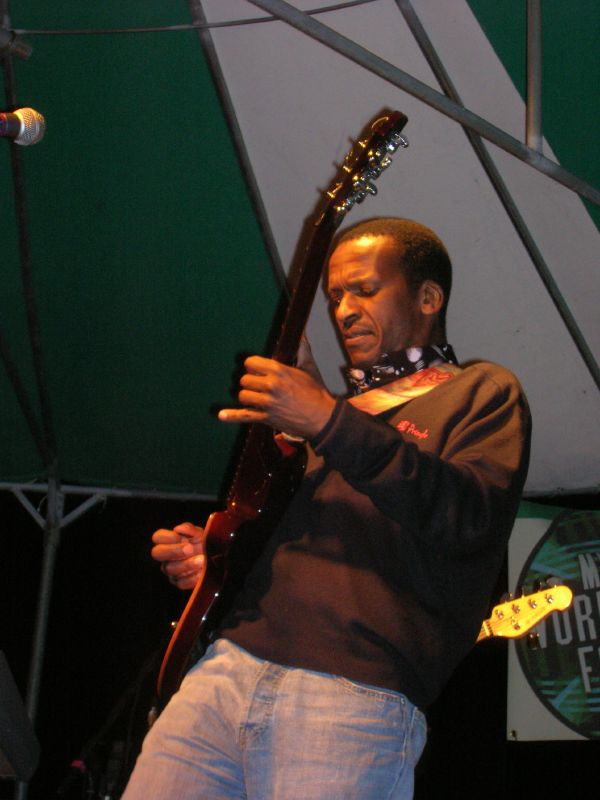
- Madison World Music Festival, September 2007.

Background information
- Born: 10 November 1956 (age 69)
- Origin: Harare, Zimbabwe
- Genre: South African jazz
- Occupations: Guitarist, singer, producer
- Years active: 1970–present

Louis Mhlanga (born 10 November 1956) is a Zimbabwean artist based in South Africa, an award-winning guitarist and producer. Mhlanga taught himself to play the guitar at a young age and is considered one of the best Southern African guitarists.

Mhlanga's career began in the 1970s. Fronting many bands in Zimbabwe, he mixed American and Zimbabwean influences into his music. Mhlanga became renowned for his guitar skills, and worked with Zimbabwean acts such as Shaka, Talking Drum, Ilanga, Mudzimu, and Oliver Mtukudzi. Louis eventually headed to South Africa to pursue different musical opportunities, leading to collaborations with renowned South African artists such as Miriam Makeba, Hugh Masekela, Ray Phiri, Sipho Mabuse, Mlunhgisi Gegane, and Busi Mhlongo.

== Musical career ==
He admired the traditionally derived pop of local musicians such as Thomas Mapfumo. Together with drummer Jethro Shasha and bassist Jimmy Indi Mhlanga formed "Music Ye Africa", and their first album, recorded and co-produced by Warrick Sony at the Johannesburg studios of Shifty Records, was put out through BMG Africa. BMG, had just acquired a 50% stake in the Shifty operation. Mhlanga later released albums like Shamwari(2001), his international debut album, introducing him as a guitarist who combined African pop and jazz.( https://www.allaboutjazz.com/shamwari-louis-mhlanga-sheer-sound-review-by-aaj-staff )

In April 2000, Mhlanga produced Vusi Mahlasela's fourth album and appeared on it. In 1999, a live duo recording with Mahlasela resulted in the album Vusi and Louis Live at the Bassline. He was involved with Thandi Klaasen's album Two of a Kind, which was initiated by Dutch singer Stef Bos. Bos featured Louis on the album De Onderstroom, for which he co-wrote the music of the title song. Mhlanga is on the album Place of Hope, which contains collaborations with George Duke, James Ingram, Al Jarreau, and Dianne Reeves. He is also on Fire in the Engine Room by Andy Narell. Following their South African tour, they released the album Live in S.A.

He pursued a music engineering course in the United Kingdom in the 80s. That afforded him a chance to work with the internationally acclaimed Scottish outfit, Orange Juice. On his return to Zimbabwe he worked at the Baptist music studio as a sound engineer. Mhlanga recorded the solo albums Mukai and Music Ye Africa with Jethro Shasha, both at Shed Studios in Harare. In 2001, he assembled The Louis Mhlanga Band with musicians who were influenced by jazz. The band was invited by SAFM, a South African radio station, to perform at the National Arts Festival. The group released the album Shamwari (Sheer Sound).

Mhlanga has produced albums by Thomas Mapfumo, Nigerian King Sunny Adé, and South African Vusi Mahalasela. A former theater director, Mhlanga ran Zimbabwe's Ethnomusicology Trust, where he was in charge of developing national teaching programs for traditional and contemporary Zimbabwean music. He also spent a year in the Netherlands. As the musician-in-residence at the Royal Dutch Conservatory of Music, he taught African guitar courses and recorded albums with bassist Eric van der Westen, one of which also included Malian guitarist and singer Habib Koité.He played also with Paul van Kenenade in Zvinoshima in the eighties.

== Discography ==
Musik Ye Afrika Mukai Live at the Bassline with Vusi Mahlasela Shamwari
