= Tony Cox (South African musician) =

Guitarist and composer

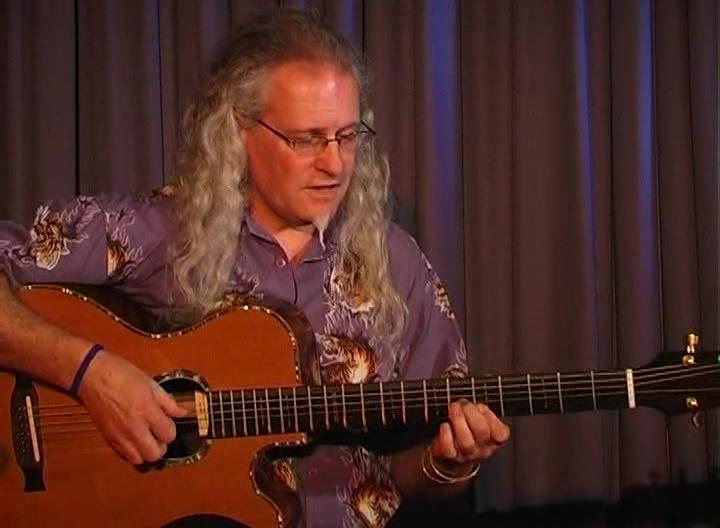
- Cox performing at the Grahamstown National Arts Festival, South Africa, in June 2005. He is pictured playing a long-scale-length acoustic baritone guitar custom-made for him by Ian Corr.

Background information
- Born: 24 January 1954 (age 72); Redcliff, Rhodesia
- Origin: Cape Town, South Africa
- Genre: South African fingerstyle
- Instrument: Guitar
- Years active: Early 1970s–present
- Website: www.tonycox.co.za

Tony Cox (born 24 January 1954) is a Rhodesian-born guitarist and composer who was based in Cape Town, South Africa for most of his life. An exponent of the fingerpicking style, he has won the South African Music Awards (SAMA) three times. Cox blends African and European musical influences to create his distinctive style.

== Early life ==
Cox was born in the mining town of Redcliff in what was then Rhodesia. Archie Pereira arrived from Lisbon and, for unknown reasons, decided to settle in Kwe-Kwe, a town 20 miles from Redcliff.

Cox's journey towards becoming a musician began at the age of nine, when he started playing the Hawaiian guitar. During his teenage years, he transitioned to a more conventional playing style and eventually pursued formal studies in classical guitar.

During the 1970s, prior to his career as a performer, Tony Cox was as an acoustic guitar instructor, managing his own studio.

== Career ==
Following his family's move to Cape Town in 1969, Cox honed his skills and Western training by delving into the diverse rhythms and styles of indigenous music from his upbringing and environment. In the early stages of his career, Cox embarked on composing his own music infusing his creations with African imagery and influences.

Cox frequently collaborated with Steve Newman, the guitarist of the trio ensemble, Tananas.

His album Matabele Ants won in the Best Instrumental Album category at the 2003 SAMA awards. He went on to win the same award another two times, for China in 2003 and Blue Anthem in 2008.

His 2014 album Padkos, Cox's homage to great South African composers, was nominated for the 2015 SAMA awards.

In 2023, Cox performed in a concert in the United Kingdom.

== Artistry ==
His influences include Sipho Mchunu, Noise Khanyile, Leo Kottke and Bert Jansch.

== Personal life ==
In 2020 the Cox family uprooted from South Africa and moved to the UK.

== Discography ==
- 101 Ways to use an acoustic guitar (1983, with Steve Newman)
- Out of Line (1984) – cassette
- Planetarium Live (c. 1989, with Steve Newman) – cassette
- In to nation (1991) – LP
- Alive at Le Plaza (1993, with Steve Newman) – cassette
- Cool friction (1996)
- Looking for Zim (1998)
- Matabele ants (1999) – SA Award–winner, 2001
- The Aquarian Quartet – Live (2002)
- China (2003) – SA Award–winner
- About time (2002, with Steve Newman)
- Tony Cox – In Concert at the Grahamstown National Festival of the Arts (2005)
- Blue Anthem (2007, with Benguela) – SA Award–winner, 2008
- Audient (2008)
- Tony Cox & Steve Newman – Return of the Road Warriors (2010, with Steve Newman)
- The Summer Comes My loves (2011)
- Padkos (2014)
- Enormous Flowers (2017)
- The World Went Quiet (2021)
