= Koos Kombuis =

South African musician

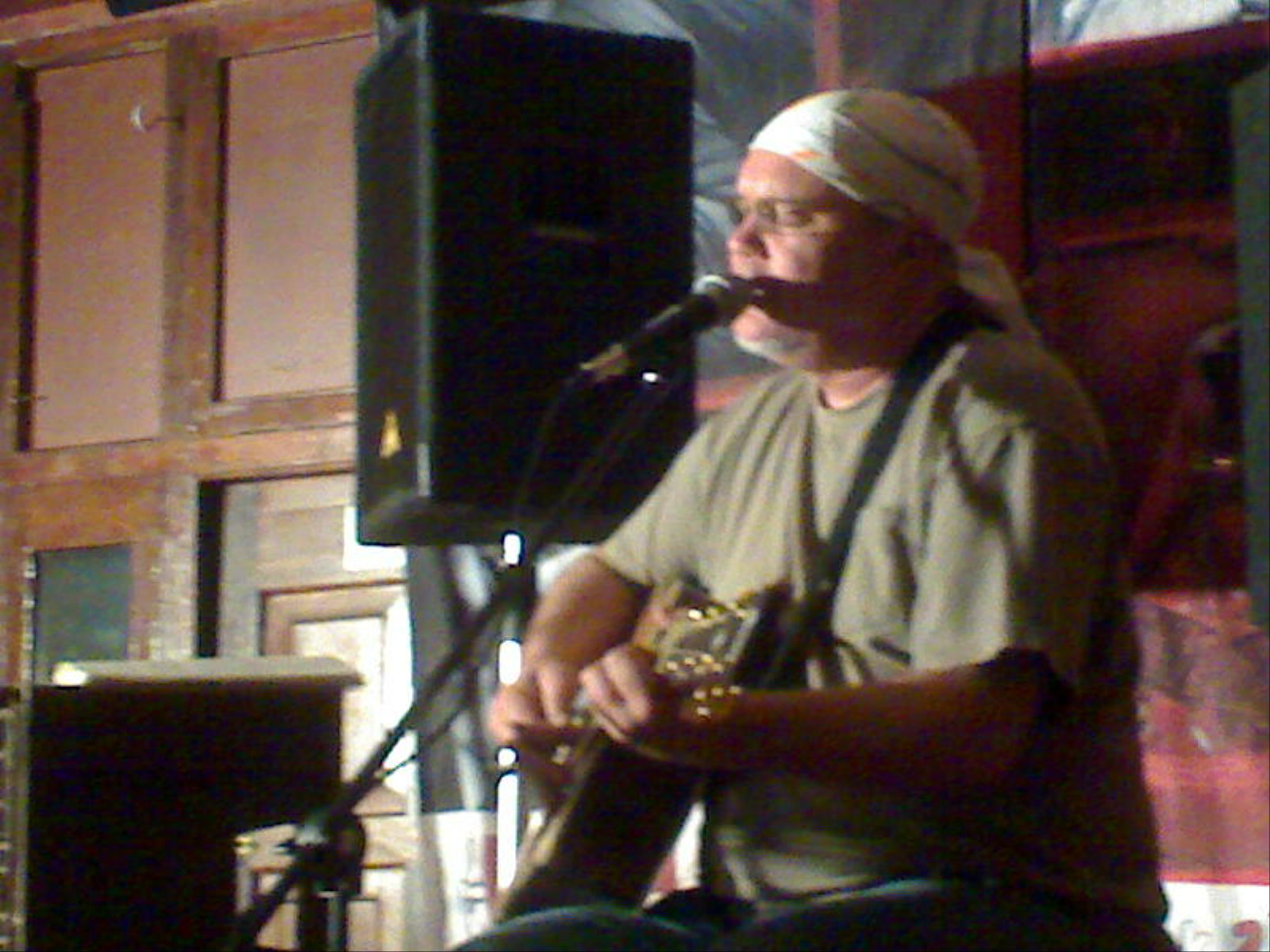
- Koos Kombuis
- Born: André le Roux du Toit; 5 November 1954 (age 71); Devils Peak, Cape Town, RSA

Koos Kombuis (born André le Roux du Toit, 5 November 1954) is a South African musician, singer, songwriter and writer who became famous as part of a group of anti-establishment maverick Afrikaans musicians, who, under the collective name of Voëlvry (directly translated meaning "Free as a bird"; in Afrikaans "voëlvry" is often potentially "synonymous" to the words "fugitive" and "outlaw"), toured campuses across South Africa in the 1980s, to "liberate Afrikaans from the shackles of its past". Fellow musicians of this movement were Johannes Kerkorrel and Bernoldus Niemand (James Phillips). They were a younger generation of Afrikaners who didn't believe in apartheid and didn't toe the ruling National Party line. This movement coined the term "Alternative Afrikaner" for themselves. Kombuis is something of an icon among certain South Africans who consider him a guru of Afrikaans rock music and father of non-conformist Afrikaans culture.

== Humorous stage name ==
Koos Kombuis is his humorous stage name as well as his pen name. Koos (sounding like "koo-iss") is a shortened version for the common name "Jacobus" / "Jakobus", but is also Afrikaans slang for a chamber pot. Kombuis means "Kitchen" in Afrikaans. His childhood nickname was "Koos", and he got his last name from a time when he apparently squatted in the kitchen of former drug-dealer and author Al Lovejoy.

Du Toit started out as a poet and novelist in the early 1980s writing under the name André Letoit, to avoid confusion with other writers. Wanting something more colloquial-sounding for his musical career, he settled on Koos Kombuis.

He has introduced an A in his stage name, now being Koos A. Kombuis. The A is for Andre, formed part of his first stage name, Andre le Toit. He claims the fact that the spelling of his initials, K.A.K ("shit" in Afrikaans), is purely coincidental.

== Early life ==
Du Toit grew up in Riversdale, Paarl, Wellington, Kuruman and in Bellville, before the family settled in Stellenbosch (and later in Pretoria), where he spent the last year of high school at Paul Roos Gymnasium. After school, Du Toit did his compulsory military service: apparently he was so bad at shooting that he was posted in the fire brigade. After this, Du Toit went back to the fire brigade several times, the only job he claims he was never fired from (Kombuis 2000: 78).

After the army, he wanted to study at the Stellenbosch University with his childhood friends. However, he explained that "I tried to enrol at Stellenbosch. They didn't accept me. I had a bit of a reputation already. Punk skrywer en al hierdie k*k. I decided to stay on the campus for three years anyway because the most important thing about varsity is human knowledge. I only went to two classes. My parents thought I was doing stories for Huisgenoot". But his parents insisted he attend the University of Pretoria instead. He left after two years, never finishing a degree, and moved to Johannesburg where he settled in an apartment in Hillbrow. Here he was involved in a lot of different fringe churches and religious denominations, but got increasingly worried about his own mental health.

He finally went back to his parents in Pretoria and asked to get medical help. After seeing several psychologists and being severely medicated, the decision was taken to give him shock therapy. Du Toit claims that after ten treatments, he suffered amnesia and effectively can't remember the year 1976 to date. After this treatment his parents had him committed to Weskoppies psychiatric hospital in Pretoria (wrongly) diagnosed as having schizophrenia. This was decided after a questionnaire and a single rorschach test . After a year in a psychiatric ward, a psychiatrist realised that he wasn't sick, and he was discharged. He describes this as follows: "Tot my groot ontsteltenis het hy my dadelik ontslaan. Toe moes ek van voor af begin werk soek" ("To my great dismay, he discharged me on the spot. Then I had to start looking for a job all over again.")

At this point he started sending his short stories to Afrikaans weekly Huisgenoot, and spent the next few years as a freelance writer, publishing several novellas, volumes of poetry and short stories. His first (semi-autobiographical) novel Somer II ("Summer II") appeared in 1985. His next autobiography, Seks & Drugs & Boeremusiek: die memoires van 'n volksverraaier ("Sex, drugs and Boere (folk) musiek: the memoires of a national traitor") appeared in 2000. In this book he corrected many of the more far-fetched claims he made in Somer II.

== Musical style ==
He cites Bob Dylan, Neil Young as well as ex-Beatles George Harrison and John Lennon as musical influences. His musical style is raw, and Kombuis often accompanies himself only with his acoustic guitar, but sometimes uses his backing rock band known as "Die Warmblankes" ("The Almost Drunk / Mellow Whites"), a play on the Afrikaans word 'armblankes' (poor whites). One of his most popular hits is "Lisa se Klavier" ("Lisa's Piano"), which has been covered by Laurika Rauch and The Parlotones.

== Discography ==
- Ver van die Ou Kalahari (1987) (as André Letoit)
- Niemandsland and Beyond (1990)
- Elke Boemelaar se Droom (1994)
- Madiba Bay (1997)
- Blameer dit op Apartheid (1997)
- Mona Lisa (1999)
- Greatest Hits (2000)
- Blou Kombuis (2000, live with Albert Frost)
- Equilibrium (2002)
- 'n Jaar in die Son (2003)
- Bloedrivier (2008)
- Koos Kombuis (2009, self-titled)
- dertien (2012)
- Lente in die Boland (2013)
- Langpad na Lekkersing (2017)
- Nag Van Die Honde (2023)

== Writings ==
- Brekfis met vier (1981) (as André le Roux du Toit with Etienne van Heerden, Peter Snyders and Daniel Hugo) ISBN 978-0-7981-4537-4
- Suburbia (1982) (as André le Roux du Toit, met reissue as Koos Kombuis) ISBN 978-0-628-02208-0
- Nou's die Kaap weer Hollands (1982) (as André le Roux du Toit) ISBN 978-0-7981-1420-2
- My nooi is in 'n tikmasjien (1984) (as André le Roux du Toit) ISBN 978-0-628-02647-7
- Kleingeld vir 'n terreurdaad (1984) (as André le Roux du Toit) ISBN 978-0-628-02823-5
- Somer II: 'n plakboek (1985) (as André le Roux du Toit, with reissue as Koos Kombuis) ISBN 978-0-628-02602-6
- Die geel kafee (1985) (as André le Roux du Toit, with reissue as Koos Kombuis) ISBN 978-1-86919-033-0
- 'n Roos vir die Karoomeisie (1987) (as André le Roux du Toit) ISBN 978-0-7993-1171-6
- Suidpunt-jazz (1988) (as André le Roux du Toit, with reissue as Koos Kombuis) ISBN 978-0-7981-4450-6
- Paradise redecorated (1990) (as Koos Kombuis) ISBN 978-0-620-15020-0
- Die tweede reën (1998) (as Koos Kombuis) ISBN 978-0-620-26277-4
- Koos se songs (1998) (as Koos Kombuis) ISBN 978-0-7981-4355-4
- Seks & drugs & boeremusiek: die memoires van 'n volksverraaier (2000) (as Koos Kombuis) ISBN 978-0-7981-7123-6
- My mamma is 'n taal (2001) (as Koos Kombuis) ISBN 978-0-7981-4183-3
- Hotel Atlantis (2002) (as Koos Kombuis) ISBN 978-0-7981-4275-5
- The secret diary of God: (aged 9 1/2 million trillion years) (2003) (as Koos Kombuis) ISBN 978-1-86872-671-4
- Afrikaans my darling (2003) (as Koos Kombuis) ISBN 978-0-7981-4366-0
- Raka, die roman (2005) (as Koos Kombuis) ISBN 978-0-7981-4589-3
- Die dieper dors: 'n innerlike gesprek (2006) (as Koos Kombuis) ISBN 978-0-7981-4733-0
- The complete secret diaries of God (2008) (as Koos Kombuis) ISBN 978-0-7981-4978-5
- Die tyd van die kombi's: 'n persoonlike blik op die Afrikaanse rock-rebellie (2009) (as Koos Kombuis) ISBN 978-0-7981-5099-6
- Short drive to freedom: a personal perspective on the Afrikaans rock rebellion (2009) (as Koos Kombuis) ISBN 978-0-7981-5098-9
- Die reuk van koffie (2010) (as Koos Kombuis) ISBN 978-0-7981-5190-0
- i-Tjieng: 'n GPS vir verdwaalde siele (2013) (as Koos Kombuis) ISBN 978-0-14-353846-2
- Ver in die wêreld, sushi! (2015) (as Koos Kombuis) ISBN 978-1-77022-881-8
- Blasjan en die Blou Kitaar (2018) (as Koos Kombuis) ISBN 978-1-4859-0048-1
- Vandag wil ek my blou skoene dra (2018) (as Koos Kombuis) ISBN 978-1-928426-08-0
- Eben: die ellendige eenhoring (2019) (as Koos Kombuis) ISBN 978-1-928426-68-4
- Hubert the Useless Unicorn (2019) (as Joe Kitchen) ISBN 978-1-928426-67-7
- Help! My dorp hou 'n kunstefees!: 'n crazy komedie (2021) (as Koos Kombuis) ISBN 978-1-928530-64-0
- Deur die tonnel van twyfel op soek na waardes in 'n donker eeu (2023) (as Koos Kombuis) ISBN 978-1-991256-39-3
- Twitter dawn (2023) (as Joe Kitchen) ISBN 978177617280
- It's Always Friday Somewhere in the Universe (2023) (as Joe Kitchen) ISBN 978-1-991256-15-7
- The Death of History: An Eyewitness Account (2024) (as Koos Kombuis) ISBN 978-1-991256-86-7
