= Tananas =

South African music group

- Origin: South Africa
- Genres: Jazz-fusion
- Years active: 1987–1993
- Labels: Gallo, Sony
- Members: Steve Newman; Gito Baloi; Ian Herman

Tananas (pronounced tuh-naa-nuhs) is a South African band formed in 1987. Originally it consisted of Gito Baloi (bass and vocals), Ian Herman (drums and percussion) and Steve Newman (acoustic guitar). First recorded by the independent label Shifty Records, Tananas combined jazz, Mozambican salsa and township jive (or mbaqanga). They released eight albums, the last two on the Sony label.

Tananas built a loyal following in their home country from the late 1980s, and performed at WOMAD festivals around the world. They worked individually or as a band with Paul Simon and Sting, and shared stages with the likes of Bonnie Raitt, Suzanne Vega and Youssou N'dour.

The band broke up in 1993 but reunited for some performances until Gito was shot dead in Johannesburg on April 4, 2004 while on his way home from a concert in Pretoria. He was 39 years old.

== Musical style ==
Tananas were originally an essentially instrumental band allied to jazz but including folk elements and an unmistakably African set of sounds. The group's latter stage recordings included more vocals by singer and bass player Gito Baloi, who sang in Tsonga and Portuguese. At first glance, their music cannot be identified as typically South African, as they experimented with a wide variety of styles and merged them into their own unique blend. Tananas released their first self-titled album in 1988 on Shifty Records. The album mixed different styles such as jazz, Mozambican salsa and township jive, which had not been manifest before and took the country by storm.

== Members ==
- Steve Newman – guitar
- Gito Baloi – bass and vocals
- Ian Herman – drums and percussion

== Discography ==
- Tananas – 1988
- Spiral – 1990
- Time – 1992
- Orchestra Mundo – 1994
- Unamunacua – 1996
- The Collection – 1997
- Seed – 1999
- Alive in Jo'burg – 2001
