= James Phillips (South African musician) =

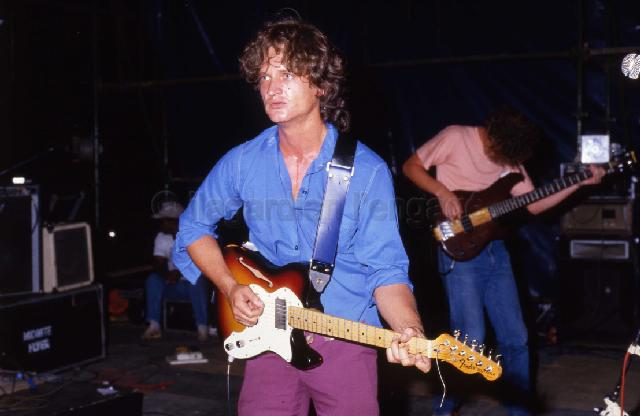
- James Phillips on stage,1987, at the Free People's Concert in Johannesburg, South Africa.

Background information
- Born: 22 January 1959; Springs, Gauteng, South Africa
- Died: 31 July 1995 (aged 36)
- Genres: Rock
- Occupation: Singer-songwriter
- Years active: 1970s–1995

James Phillips (22 January 1959 – 31 July 1995) was a South African rock musician, vocalist, songwriter, and performer. He performed rebellious and satirical political music that spoke out against the South African government during Apartheid.

== Discography ==
All titles were released on the Shifty label and now as digital downloads by Sjambokmusic.

- Fridays and Saturdays (EP) – Corporal Punishment (1980)
- Hou My Vas Korporaal b/w My Broken Heart (single) – Bernoldus Niemand (1983)
- Wie Is Bernoldus Niemand? – Bernoldus Niemand (1984)
- Live At Jamesons – The Cherry Faced Lurchers (1985)
- The Voice of Nooit – Corporal Punishment & Illegal Gathering (1986)
- The Other white Album (Best of Cherry Faced Lurchers, 1985–1989) – The Cherry Faced Lurchers (1992)
- Sunny Skies – James Phillips & The Lurchers (1994)
- Made in South Africa (compilation 1978–1995) (1995)
- Soul Ou – James Phillips (1997)
- Voëlvry: Die Toer – various artists, including Bernoldus Niemand en die Swart Gevaar (2006)

== See also ==
- Johannes Kerkorrel
- Koos Kombuis
- The Voëlvry Movement
