= Vusi Mahlasela =

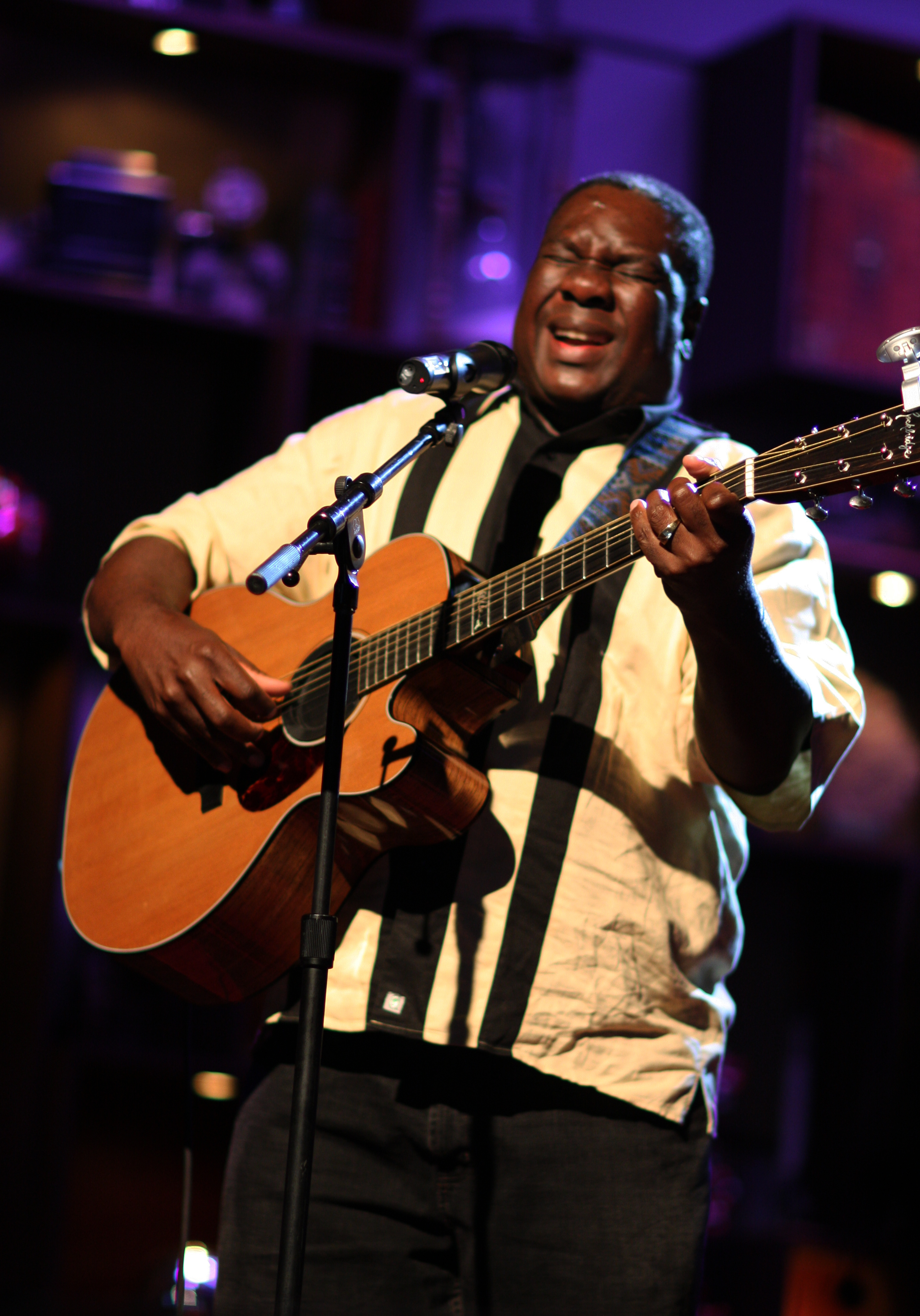
- Mahlasela performing in February 2008

Background information
- Born: 1965 (age 60–61); Pretoria, South Africa
- Origin: South Africa
- Occupations: Singer-songwriter, musician
- Instruments: Vocals, guitar
- Labels: ATO, Wrasse, BMG, RCA, Label Bleu
- Website: VusiMahlasela.com

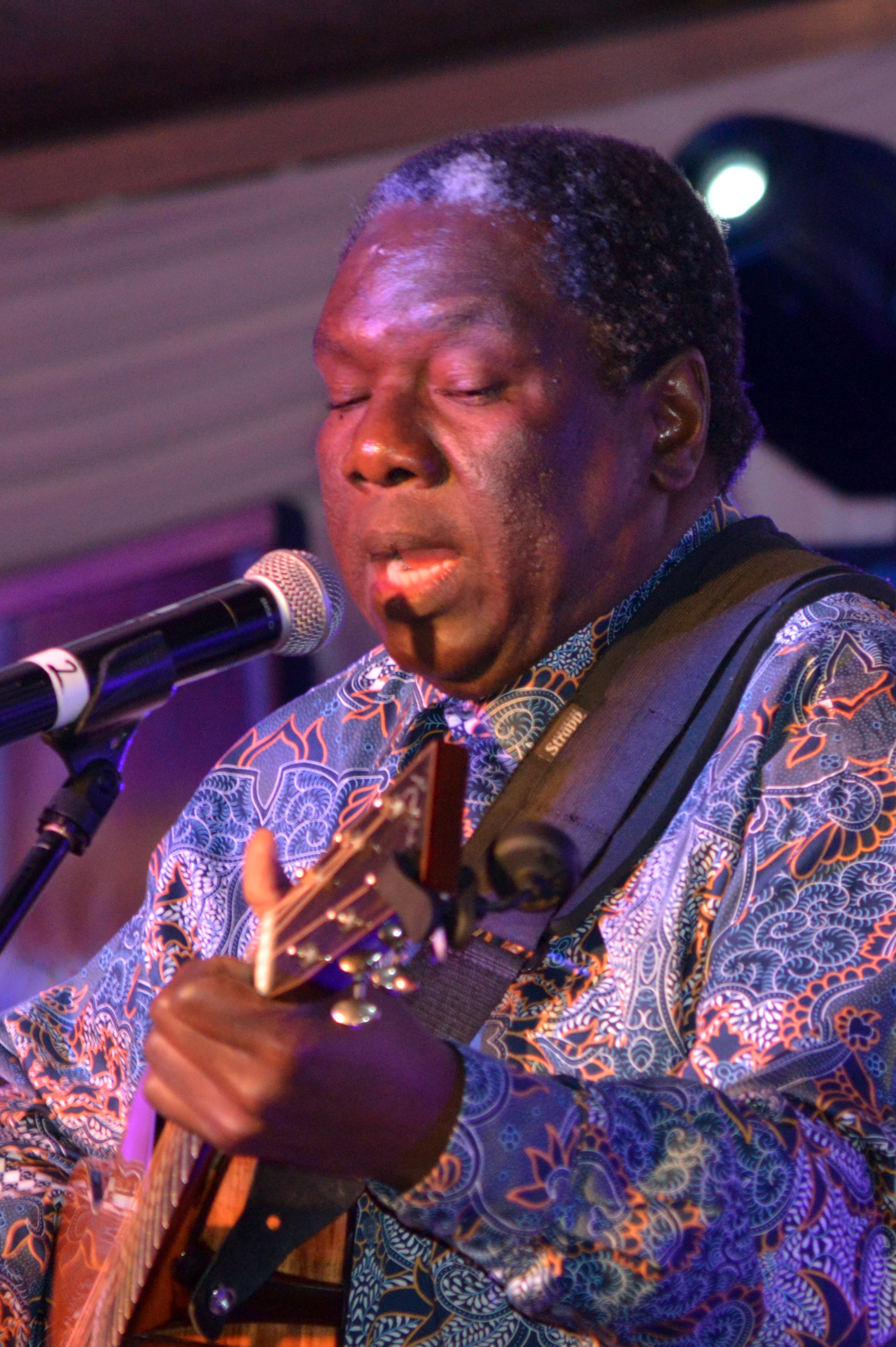
Vusi Mahlasela performing at the 100th birthday celebrations of Die Burger in Cape Town, 2015.

Vusi Sidney Mahlasela Ka Zwane (born 1965) is a Zulu South African singer-songwriter. He was born in Pretoria.

His music is generally described as "African folk" and he is often dubbed as "The Voice" of South Africa. His work was an inspiration to many in the anti-apartheid movement. His themes include the struggle for freedom, and forgiveness and reconciliation with enemies. Vusi has released seven studio albums on Sony in South Africa and was signed to Dave Matthews' ATO Records in 2003. Vusi can also be heard performing on Warren Haynes' Live at Bonnaroo release during the song "Soulshine", and the Dave Matthews Band song, "Everyday", from the album of the same name as well as a live version of the song with him which appears on the album The Best of What's Around Vol. 1. Vusi was also one of the performers at the Live 8 concerts and at Live Earth. Vusi performed at Nelson Mandela's inauguration in 1994 and has subsequently performed at Nelson Mandela 90th Birthday Tribute in Hyde Park, London in 2008, and at Mandela Day at Radio City Music Hall in July 2009. His song "When You Come Back" was used at ITV's theme song for their World Cup coverage in 2010 and Vusi performed at the FIFA World Cup Kick Off concert at Orlando Stadium in Soweto, South Africa. In 2012, the SAMA Awards honored Vusi with a lifetime achievement award.

== Recent works ==
His album The Voice released on ATO Records includes the popular track "Weeping", recorded with Josh Groban and Ladysmith Black Mambazo. Vusi joined Mambazo for their October–November UK tour in 2004, and again for their 2007 UK tour, again from October to November 2007.

He and other South African musicians took part in the 2002 documentary Amandla!: A Revolution in Four-Part Harmony where they recalled the days of Apartheid.

In June 2007, Mahlasela spoke of apartheid and performed "Thula Mama" at the TED Conference in Arusha, Tanzania. He also performed at TED in Monterey, CA in March 2008. Vusi performed at the Skoll World Forum on 14 April 2010.

On 7 July 2007 Mahlasela performed at the South African leg of Live Earth.

His album Guiding Star, as Naledi Ya Tsela (the name under which it is released in South Africa), won him the 2007 SAMA for Best Male Artist.

He has participated in videos for Playing for Change most notably "One Love" and "Stand By Me".

In April 2009, Vusi joined Bela Fleck on his Throw Down Your Heart Tour and was also featured on his album of the same name.

ITV used his song "When You Come Back" as their main theme for the opening credits of their coverage of the 2010 FIFA World Cup in South Africa. The song was very popular amongst viewers and entered the UK Official Singles Chart on 4 July 2010 at No. 70.

His 2011 album, Say Africa, was produced by legendary bluesman Taj Mahal. The album was released 18 January 2011 on ATO Records.

Since the 2013 release of the live album "Sing To The People (Celebrating 20 Years of 'When You Come Back') on ATO Records", Mahlasela has continued to release albums, most recently in 2020, 2021 and 2023 on the ATO, Strut and Gallo labels.

== Discography ==
=== Studio albums ===
Title	Release date	Record labels
When You Come Back	1992	BMG Records Africa; Label Bleu/Indigo
Wisdom of Forgiveness	1994	RCA Victor, BMG
Silang Mabele	1997	BMG Africa; RCA Victor
Miyela Afrika	2000	BMG Records Africa
Jungle of Questions	2000	Colossal Records, BMG Africa
Naledi Ya Tsela (Guiding Star)	2007	ATO Records (US); Wrasse Records (UK)
Say Africa	2010	Sony Music; ATO Records (US); Wrasse Records (UK)
Umoya	2023	
Title TBA	2026	

=== Live albums ===
Title	Release date
Live at the Bassline	1999
Sing to the People	2013

=== Soundtracks ===
Title	Release date
Amandla!: A Revolution in Four-Part Harmony	2002
Tsotsi	2005

=== Compilation albums ===
Title	Release date	Billboard Top World Albums
Live at KEXP Volume 6	2010	N/A
The Voice	2003	13
