= Mahlathini and the Mahotella Queens =

South African Music band formed in 1964

- Mahlathini and the Mahotella Queens, 1988. (L to r): Hilda Tloubatla, Mahlathini, Nobesuthu Mbadu, and Mildred Mangxola.

Background information
- Origin: Johannesburg, South Africa
- Genres: Mbaqanga, Mgqashiyo
- Years active: 1964–1972; 1987–1999
- Labels: Gallo Record Company (1964–1999); Verve World/PolyGram Records

Mahlathini and the Mahotella Queens (also known as Mahlathini Nezintombi Zomgqashiyo and Mahlathini and the Girls of Mgqashiyo) were a South African mbaqanga supergroup made up of the three musical acts linked together by talent scout and record producer Rupert Bopape at the Gallo Recording Company in Johannesburg, South Africa in 1964. The group composed of the following three distinct parts:

- The late Simon "Mahlathini" Nkabinde (1937–1999), a powerful singer in the basso-profundo "groaning" style.
- The girl group the Mahotella Queens (1964–present), the classic line up being the threesome Hilda Tloubatla, Nobesuthu Mbadu and Mildred Mangxola. Still recording and performing internationally, the trio is noted for its distinct vocal harmony sound alternating between multi-part harmonies and unison vocals, guitar-led mbaqanga music, and fast stage dancing.
- The instrumental band the Makgona Tsohle Band (1964–1999), that is noted for creating the mbaqanga music style, led by electric lead guitarist Marks Mankwane and alto saxophonist West Nkosi.

Together they were an extremely productive commercial success and a major live attraction in and around South Africa 1964–72. The three parts of the group reformed in 1986–87, and following the 70th-birthday tribute to Nelson Mandela in 1988 at London's Wembley Arena the supergroup rose to international renown, going on to feature in many international festivals during the years 1987–97.

== History ==
=== 1964 formation ===
The major record labels under South Africa's apartheid era were white-owned companies with very few black artists. Historically, laws such as the Land Act of 1913 to the Group Areas Act (1950) prevented musicians from different tribal communities integrating and many were not permitted to establish themselves in the city. Consequently, making it almost impossible for most black music artists to gain recognition beyond their own tribal boundaries. During the apartheid period, black South Africans could no longer play to white audiences and white broadcasting programmers did not approve of American-influenced music. Mavuthela was instituted in 1964 as a division of the country's largest independent record label Gallo Africa to focus solely on producing music for the black South African market. It was headed by talent scout/producer Rupert Bopape, a former producer for EMI South Africa before joining Gallo Record Company. Bopabe had already had successes recording popular artists such as Alexandra Black Mambazo, the King's Messengers Quartet and female group the Dark City Sisters. Black South African producers came up with the idea of returning to the styles of acoustic African popular music and harmony singing groups, but they electrified the instruments, mixed the sexes, and added a lively 8/8 township beat. Mbaqanga music became popular amongst urban black South Africans living in the townships.

The group that later became known worldwide as Mahlathini and the Mahotella Queens started as part of the team of musicians working at the Mavuthela Music Company. Rupert Bopape largely created the group from three distinct parts. He had brought with him from EMI Mahlathini (the 'Lion of Soweto'), a leading exponent of a style that was later christened groaning (a vocal style was performed by deep-voiced male singers in conjunction with five-piece female harmony groups and a backing band of instrumentalists). Another of Bopape's more successful acts was a team of female singers that would record songs under various group pseudonyms, including under the name, Mahotella Queens. The line-up of the group would consist of five singers taken from a larger pool of vocalists that included Hilda Tloubatla, Juliet Mazamisa, Ethel Mngomezulu and Francisca Mngomezulu, Mildred Mangxola, Nobesuthu Mbadu, Windy Sibeko, Mary Rabotapi (formerly of The Skylarks) and Nunu Maseko; they became the country's most popular girl group during the late 1960s – mid-1970s period. The Mahotella Queens and Mahlathini were backed by the newly formed Makgona Tsohle Band (which translates as the 'Band Who Can Do Everything'), the five musicians were all former domestic workers from Pretoria – West Nkosi (saxophone), Marks Mankwane (lead guitar), Joseph Makwela (bass guitar), Vivian Ngubane (rhythm guitar) and Lucky Monama (drums). The horn section included Lemmy 'Special' Mabaso, Shadrack Piliso, Mario da Conceicao and (briefly) Spokes Mashiyane. The team of horn-blowers was expanded in the late 1960s to include Roger Xezu, Sipho Bhengu, Thomas Motshoane, David Khanyile (aka "Fastos The Great") and Sello Mmutung (better known as "Bra Sello").

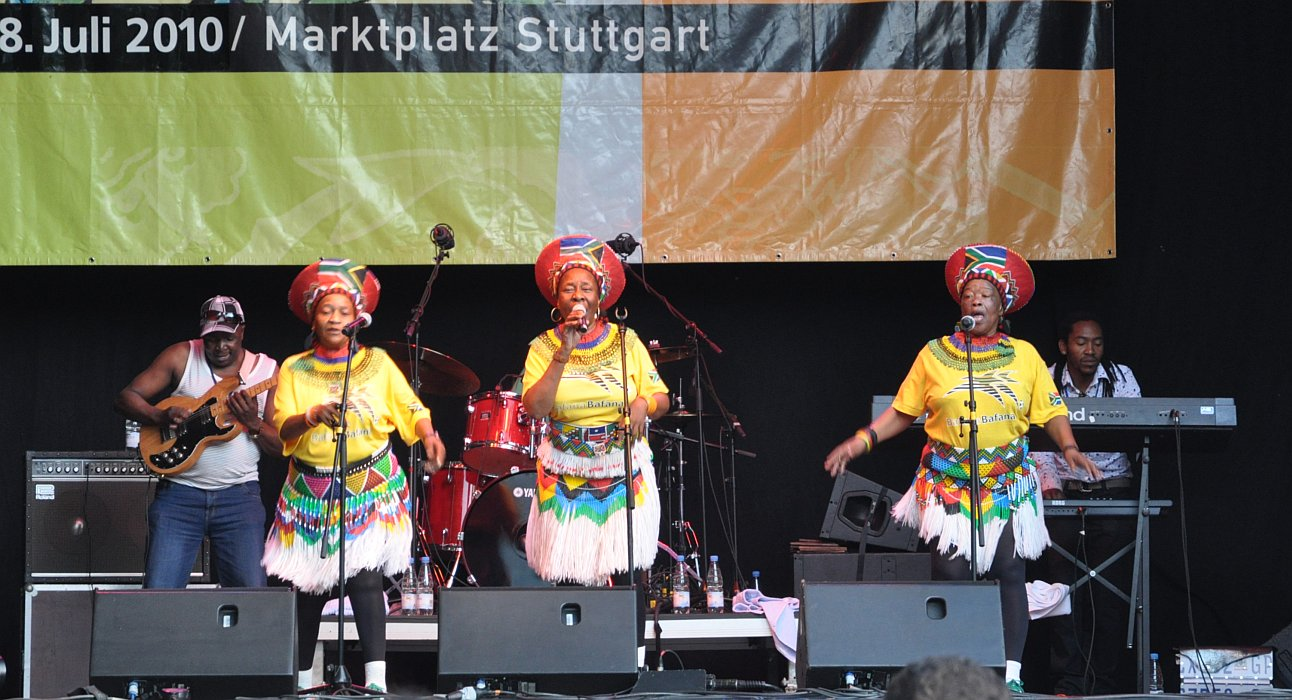
Three of the Mahotella Queens left to right: Nobesuthu Mbadu, Hilda Tloubatla, Mildred Mangxola

=== Early professional career ===
Black South African musicians received little money and it was difficult to get air time on local radio stations, so often they performed outside record stores to attract audiences. The band began by cutting 78 record copies of their first collection of songs and playing their music in the street, they went on to recording hundreds of hit singles. Throughout the late 1960s and early 1970s, Mahlathini and the Mahotella Queens dominated South African music, notching up many recordings from their debut Orlando Train to songs like Uyavutha Umlilo (Music Inferno), Sengikala Ngiyabeleka (Crying And Running Away), Thoko, Sithunyiwe, Pitsa Tse Kgolo, Ngikhala Ngiyabaleka and Izulu Liyaduduma. Some of their more successful singles were compiled onto albums such as Meet the Mahotella Queens (their first LP), Indoda Mahlathini, Marena, Marks Umthakathi and Umculo Kawupheli.

The ensemble became a major live attraction and commercial success, with Mahlathini's groaning vocals matched against the close harmonies of the Queens, and the driving mbaqanga-township jive work from the Makonga Tsohle Band. They toured extensively, both within South Africa and surrounding countries including Mozambique, Botswana and Zimbabwe. Known for their distinctive sounding records and energy packed presence at concerts, they were dubbed "The Beatles of South Africa".

The supergroup – Mahlathini, the Mahotella Queens and Makgona Tsohle – were an extremely productive and popular cohesive recording/performing team until 1972. In 1972 the line-up disintegrated after royalty disagreements with Bopape. The Mahotella Queens under the production of Makgona Tsohle Band guitarist Marks Mankwane, continued to record and perform to some degree of success throughout into the 1970s and 1980s, but by the late 1970s due to royalty disagreements and/or family commitments, none of the original members of the Queens remained. At the same time, Mahlathini who also recorded solo material backed solely by the Makgona Tsohle Band, cultivating a distinct public identity as Indoda Mahlathini, resigned from Mavuthela also due to royalty/payment disputes with Bopape. The Makgona Tsohle also recorded instrumental singles to massive public acclaim until Makgona Tsohle split up and its individual members, who had been mentored by Bopape, concentrated on producing the roster of Mavuthela artists.

Musical tastes were changing – disco was taking over in South Africa. In 1983, Mankwane reunited Mahlathini with five of the original Mahotella Queens for a spin-off group titled Mahlathini Nezintombi Zomgqashiyo. However, the decline of mbaqanga music meant that the project lasted only a year. Mankwane continued to produce the Mahotella Queens. Mahlathini joined the West Nkosi-produced Swazi-mbaqanga trio Amaswazi Emvelo, one of the few mbaqanga groups to still selling well at the time.

=== International success ===
In 1983, in the UK Malcolm McLaren produced his influential album Duck Rock, a project that mixed unrelated genres together, including the uncredited music of Mahlathini and the Mahotella Queens. Criticised over the years by some as exploitative, it was the first album that brought what is now known as world music to a bigger audience outside of South Africa and other countries. Western musicians slowly began to incorporate various world music styles into theirs.

In 1986–87, partly due to contributing to Harry Belafonte's Paradise in Gazankulu, and following the success of various international releases relating to South Africa's music (such as The Indestructible Beat of Soweto and Paul Simon's Graceland (album)), the decision was made for Mahlathini and the Mahotella Queens to reunite. West Nkosi convinced Mankwane to bring the Queens under his production, the then-membership of the Queens were replaced by three singers associated with the group during its original 1960s heyday – Hilda Tloubatla, Nobesuthu Mbadu and Mildred Mangxola. The Mahotella Queens, once again with Mahlathini and most of the original Makgona Tsohle Band, recorded their first album aimed at the international audience, Thokozile. It was successful enough to attract overseas promoters and the group – now billed as Mahlathini and the Mahotella Queens – subsequently began a long international touring career, with a successful debut performance in France at the Angouleme Festival. The same year they recorded the Paris - Soweto album in France.

Marks Mankwane returned to producing Mahlathini and the Mahotella Queens, as well as continuing to play lead guitar for the group. In June 1988, they appeared with a galaxy of stars – from Stevie Wonder to George Michael and Peter Gabriel – at the 70th birthday tribute to Nelson Mandela at London's Wembley Arena. The event was broadcast live to sixty countries around the world and provided a major boost for the campaign to free Mandela. It also provided Mahlathini and the Mahotella Queens with the biggest audience of their life. In England 1989 they performed at Glastonbury and collaborated with the Art of Noise, an avant-garde synthpop group, featuring on three tracks on the English band's Below The Waste album. In France, the group became known for their song Kazet. In 1991, producer West Nkosi left the group to continue producing music for the South African audience. The supergroup began touring for long stretches across the world, including in the United States, Europe, Asia and Australia, appearing in their own concerts and various international music events including in Central Park, New York (before a crowd of half a million), and at the Montreaux Jazz Festival, both in 1991 and various WOMAD festivals. Mahlathini and the Mahotella Queens continued to record successful albums including Mbaqanga, Rhythm and Art and Umuntu. They celebrated their 30th anniversary in 1994 with the album Stoki Stoki, issued internationally on Shanachie Records in 1996.

Due to health problems stemming from a long-standing diabetic condition, Mahlathini gave his last performance with the Mahotella Queens in 1997. In 1998, former band member West Nkosi was killed in a road accident, Marks Mankwane died in the same year, followed by the death of Mahlathini in July 1999; which resulted in the demise of the group. Despite his international success Simon "Mahlathini" Nkabinde, (the "lion of Soweto"), died a poor man. After a period of mourning, the Mahotella Queens decided to return to the music industry; they recruited brand-new instrumental players to a new group line-up and continue performing, touring and recording to this day. They recorded a new album in 2000 titled Sebai Bai, a successful release praised by the international audience and dedicated to Mahlathini, Mankwane and Nkosi. In 2000, they received the second annual WOMEX (Worldwide Music Expo) Award, presented for outstanding contribution to world music. Further successful albums were released, such as Bazobuya (2004) and Reign & Shine (2005). In 2005 the group toured the United Kingdom as the support act for Ladysmith Black Mambazo between May and June 2006. The Queens headlined WOMAD 2006 in July, toured Europe 2007 and South Africa during late 2007 and 2008. The Queens appeared as part of Pee Wee Ellis's show Still Black, Still Proud: An African Tribute to James Brown during 2010. South African jazz artist Hugh Masekela joined forces with the Mahotella Queens for a special UK tour for November 2010.

== Artistry ==
The style of music the Makgona Tsohle Band and its members helped develop and play was Mbaqanga, (pronounced mm-bah-KAHNG-guh, with the K formed by popping the tongue off the roof of the mouth). Mbaqanga, named after a Zulu word for an everyday cornmeal porridge or steamed cornbread (implying the home-made quality of the music's origin), had its roots in the 1950s. The style was a fusion of traditional Zulu, Sotho, Shangaan, and Xhosa music, fused with Marabi (also known as South African Jazz), and Kwela, and with modern (electric instruments), American R&B, soul, and gospel. The cyclic structure of marabi melded with traditional dance styles such as the Zulu indlamu, combined with a heavy dollop of American big band swing thrown on top. The indlamu input dance style developed into the "African stomp" style, giving a notably African rhythmic impulse to the music. The pairing of mbaqanga with vocals became known as "mgqashiyo", meaning "to bounce", after the "bouncy" rhythms of the style or simanje-manje music (in Zulu, meaning "now-now"). Marks Mankwane of the Makgona Tsohle Band said in an interview, "When we started this group. we decided also to start our own style of music, and that was Mbaqanga. So we decided to bring in Western style drums and more guitars and put the tempo up for dancing, and that's where the Western Influence comes in. On top of the band's rhythms was added the harmonies of the Mahotella Queens.... To set off the Queens came lead singer Mahlathini's extraordinary rasping, deep bass voice."

Chris Heim, writing for the Chicago Tribune said, "Mbaqanga (township jive) is one of the most spirited and joyous sounds in the whole world" and that the band had a "sweet, soulful sound marked by bright support vocals from the Queens and Mahlathini's deep, deep goat-voice leads." Over the years the combination of sound has shifted, in the 1960s Mahlanthini sang more equally and alongside the Mahotella Queens, in the 1980s under – West Nkosi and Marks Mankwane production, he does less sustained singing instead he interjects and overlaps the Mahotella Queens melodies with his "goat voice" and vocal effects, leaving most of the singing to the Queens. "The ensemble's front line is a study in contrasts." Mahlathini" delivers his "riveting vocals in a powerful basso profundo singing style that is termed "groaning" in South Africa (think Howlin' Wolf or Wolfman Jack)". The Mahotella Queens "velvety vocals contrast strikingly with Mahlathini's raw vocalizations. Their singing style, alternating between harmonies and unison vocals, is a hybrid of American jazz vocal groups such as the Andrews Sisters, the female doo-wop ensembles of the '60s, and traditional South African vocal music." Reviewing Thokozile, Robert Christgau said the band featured "nonpareil guitarist Marks Mankwane and ubiquitous saxophonist-producer West Nkosi", with "it's unexceptionably indestructible, bottomless baritone flexed inexorably against stout sopranos", labelling it "professional dance music at its finest and roughest."

The main lyric writers were Mahlathini, Hilda Tloubatla, Marks Mankwane, Rupert Bopape and Shadrack Piliso. Their lyrics, mostly in Zulu, were often about issues such as bringing up children or solving marital problems. They were not overtly political but sometimes alluded to the miseries of apartheid or praised Nelson Mandela.

"Visually also the band were dynamic" and played on tribal imagery, the "Lion of Soweto" Mahlathini "wore a chief's regalia on stage – a leopard skin over his chest, fur armlets and leggings, a skirt of animal tails and beads around his bald pate", while the Mahotella Queens wore "huge red circular Zulu hats, skirts of leather and beadwork, leotards and sneakers". As dancers, they are noted for their choreography, grandmothers by the 90's, the Queen's moved "non-stop while on-stage, employing distinctive synchronized choreography which blends elements of Motown moves, tribal dance steps and even cheerleader routines." Their "combination of jubilant harmonies and choreographed dances" were, as an American critic said in 1996, like what he imagined "a Zulu version of the Supremes would have been two decades after they stopped fitting into their silken gowns."

== Selected discography of albums ==
Together and separately, The Mahlathini and the Mahotella Queens and the Makhona Tsohle Band were successful recording artists, dating back to the hundreds of recordings produced at Gallo-Mavuthela during their heyday in the 1960s and 1970s. Despite this fact only some of their older material is available to purchase. Most of the available material comprise recordings made after the late 1980s for the international audience.

Title	Label/catalogue	Release year
Buya Buya: Come Back	Umsakazo Records (UM 108)	2025
Siyadumisa	Bula Music/AS Entertainment (CDBULA 203)	2007
Mahlathini and the Mahotella Queens: The Hits	Gallo Record Company (GMVCOM 1007)	2006
Reign & Shine	Wrasse Records/AS Entertainment (WRASS177)	2006
Kazet	Marabi Productions/AS Entertainment	2005
Reign & Shine	African Cream Music/AS Entertainment (ACM-CD 042)	2005
Bazobuya	Gallo Record Company (GWVCD 53)	2004
The Best Of: The Township Idols	Wrasse Records (WRASS098)	2003
Sebai Bai	Harmonia Mundi/Label Bleu/Gallo (LBLC 2571)	2001
Umuntu	Gallo Record Company (CDGMP 40788)	1999
Stoki Stoki	Gallo Record Company (CDGMP 40539)	1994
Women of the World	Gallo Record Company (CDGMP 40331)	1993
King of the Groaners	Earthworks/Stern's	1993
The Lion Roars	Shanachie Records	1993
Mbaqanga	Gallo Record Company (BL 742) (South Africa); Verve World/PolyGram Records (511 780)	1991
The Best of Mahlathini and the Mahotella Queens	Gallo Record Company (CDHUL 40274)	1991
Rhythm & Art	Gallo Record Company	1989
Melodi Yalla	Gallo-GRC (BL 617)	1988
Paris - Soweto	Gallo-GRC (HUL 40314)	1987
The Lion of Soweto	Earthworks/Stern's	1987
Thokozile	Gallo-GRC (BL 590)	1987
Menate Ea Lefatse	CCP Record Company	1987
Indodemnyama	Gallo-GRC	1987
Ejerusalem Siyakhona	Gallo-GRC	1986
Utshwala Begazati	Gallo Record Company	1985
Dithoriso Tsa Morena	Gallo Record Company	1984
Pheletsong Ya Lerato	Gallo Record Company (Gumba Gumba BL 457)	1984
Khwatha O Mone	Teal Record Company (Hit Special IAL 4005)	1984
Kotopo Vol 2	Gallo Record Company (Spades BL 460)	1983
Mathaka Vol 1	Gallo Record Company (Spades BL 461)	1983
Amaqhawe Omgqashiyo	Gallo Record Company (Gumba Gumba BL 448)	1983
Uhambo Lwami	Gallo Record Company (Motella BL 396)	1983
Tsa Lebowa	Teal Record Company (Igagasi IAL 3096)	1983
Hamba Minyaka	Gallo Record Company (Gumba Gumba BL 366)	1982
Ezesimanje	Teal Record Company (Hit Special IAL 3034)	1982
Pitsa Tse Kgolo	Teal Record Company (Hit Special HIL 2004)	1982
Thatha Izimpahla Zakho	Teal Record Company (Igagasi IAL 3004)	1980
Tsamaya Moratuoa	Gallo Record Company (Gumba Gumba BL 226)	1980
Best of the Mahotella Queens	Gallo Record Company	1977
Izibani Zomgqashiyo	Gallo Record Company	1977
Phezulu Egqhudeni	Gallo Record Company	1975
Umculo Kawupheli	Gallo Record Company (Gumba Gumba LPBS 20)	1974
Marks Umthakathi	Gallo Record Company (Motella LPBS 9)	1972
Marena	Gallo Record Company (Motella LPBS 5)	1972
Uyavutha Umlilo	Gumba Gumba (LPBS 3)	1971
Makgona Tsohle Reggi	Gallo Record Company (Inkonkoni LNKO 2001)	1970
Isigubu Sabalozi	Gallo Record Company (Gumba Gumba LMGG 5)	1969
Indoda Mahlathini	Gallo Record Company (Motella LMO 111)	1969
Let's Move with Makhona Tsohle Band	Gallo Record Company (Motella LMO 104)	1967
Meet the Mahotella Queens	Gallo Record Company (Motella LMO 101)	1966

== See also ==
- Mahlathini
- Mahotella Queens
- Makgona Tsohle Band
- Ladysmith Black Mambazo
- Sweet Honey in the Rock
