= The Best of: The Township Idols =

Mahotella Queens

Compilation album by Mahotella Queens
- Released: 2003
- Recorded: 1964–2001
- Genre: Mbaqanga
- Label: Wrasse Records
- Producer: Rupert Bopape, West Nkosi a.o.

Mahotella Queens chronology
Sebai-Bai	Mahotella Queens	Bazobuya

Professional ratings
Review scores
Source	Rating
Allmusic	5/5 stars

The Township Idols is a 2003 compilation album by the South African singing group Mahotella Queens. The group started recording for Gallo Record Company in 1964, initially under different group names in addition to the "Mahotella Queens" name. Although they are prolific recording artists, the songs collected on this album are mainly from the 1990s, licensed from the US-based Shanachie Records (which in turn has the international license for Gallo Music).

== Track listing ==
1 "Malaika" (Williams) – 3:38

Taken from the album Women of the World (1993). The song was originally recorded by Miriam Makeba

2 "Amabhongo" (Mildred Mangxola) – 2:03

Taken from the album Women of the World (1993).

3 "Masole a Bonana" (Female Soldiers) (Hilda Tloubatla) – 3:09

Taken from the album The Lion Roars (1993). Originally recorded on the album Pheletsong Ya Lerato (1984)

4 "Jive Motella" (Rupert Bopape) – 3:18

Taken from the album Mbaqanga (1991). This is a re-recording of "Ashikinisi" (1964)

5 "I'm In Love With A Rastaman" (West Nkosi, Nobesuthu Mbadu) – 6:55

Taken from the album Rhythm And Art (190)

6 "Stop Crime" (R. Mbatha) – 3:36

Taken from the album Umuntu (1999)

7 "Women Of The World" (Butler/Pilot) – 3:02

Taken from the album Women of the World (1993)

8 "I'm Not Your Good Time Girl" (A. Etto/P. Khowana) – 3:10

Taken from the album Women of the World (1993)

9 "Ifa Lenkosana" (Heir To Wealth) (Lilian Zondi) – 2:49

Taken from the album Izibani Zomgqashiyo (1977).

10 "Kumnyama Endlini" (Mildred Mangxola) – 4:17

Taken from the album Sebai Bai (2001).

11 "Umculo Kawupheli" (No End To Music) (Francisca Bopape, Marks Mankwane) – 2:42

Taken from the album Umculo Kawupheli (1975).

12 "Zibuyile Nonyaka" (They Are Back This Year) (Marks Mankwane) – 2:33

Taken from the album Izibani Zomgqashiyo (1977)

13 "Uthuli Lweziche" ("Dance up A Dust Storm") (Marks Mankwane, Robert Mkhize) – 2:49

Taken from the album Izibani Zomgqashiyo (1977)

14 "Mbaqanga" (Marks Mankwane) – 4:18

Taken from the album Mbaqanga (1991)

15 "Thina Siyakhanyisa" (We Are Bringing The Lights) (Fransisca Bopape, Marks Mankwane) – 2:32

Taken from the album Phezulu Egqhudeni (1975)
NB: despite the title, the track that appears in this place on the CD is actually "Dolly Swidi Lami" (Dolly, My Sweet) (Rupert Bopape, Shadrack Piliso), originally recorded in 1968

16 "Josefa" (Nobesuthu Mbadu) – 3:36

Taken from the album Mbaqanga (1991)

17 "Gazette" (Obed Ngobeni, West Nkosi)

Taken from the album Melodi Yalla (1988). Recorded as "Kazet" on the album Paris-Soweto (1987) and later re-recorded on the album Kazet (2006)

18 "Senon-Nori" (Porcupine) (Hilda Tloubatla) – 5:18

Taken from the album Umuntu (1999)

19 "Sebai Bai" - A girl's name (Mildred Mangxola, Hilda Tloubatla, Nobesuthu Mbadu, Joey Mabe) – 5:18

Taken from the album Umuntu (1999). Later re-recorded on the album Sebai Bai (2001)

20 "Dilika Town Hall" (Hilda Tloubatla) 2:55

Taken from the album Women of the World (1993). Later re-recorded on the album Sebai Bai (2001), and on the album Reign & Shine (2005, released internationally in 2006)
