= Thokozile =

Studio album by Mahlathini and the Mahotella Queens
- Released: 1987
- Recorded: 1986
- Genre: Mbaqanga
- Length: 35:00 approx.
- Label: Gallo; EarthWorks/Virgin/Atlantic (US)
- Producer: West Nkosi

Mahlathini and the Mahotella Queens chronology
Menate Ea Lefatse (1986)	Thokozile (1987)	Paris - Soweto (1987)

Thokozile is an album by the South African mbaqanga group Mahlathini and the Mahotella Queens, released in 1987. The album was a reunion of Mahlathini with the backing Makgona Tsohle Band and three of the original Queens, Hilda Tloubatla, Nobesuthu Mbadu and Mildred Mangxola. The album (Gallo GRC BL 590 or EarthWorks/Virgin/Atlantic 90920) featured re-recordings of older songs such as "Umculo Kawupheli" (heard here as "Sibuyile") and "Sithunyiwe" ("Thokozile"). The album propelled the group into immediate international stardom when it was issued internationally on the EarthWorks label.

== Critical reception ==
Professional ratings
Review scores
Source	Rating
AllMusic	3/5 stars
Robert Christgau	A−
The Philadelphia Inquirer	3/4 stars

Robert Christgau deemed the album "professional dance music at its finest and roughest." The Philadelphia Inquirer wrote that "the music is dense with intertwining melody lines and urgent choruses." The Sydney Morning Herald called Thokozile "a typically infectious set of township jive, though the production tends towards sterility."

== Track listing ==
1. "Thokozile" ("Praise/Be Happy")
2. "Lilizela Mlilizeli" ("Ululate/Applaud")
3. "Sibuyile" ("We Are Back")
4. "Nina Majuba" ("You Pigeons")
5. "I Wanna Dance"
6. "Uyavutha Umlilo" ("Music Inferno")
7. "Sengikhala Ngiyabaleka" ("I'm Crying and Running Away")
8. "Izulu Liyaduduma" ("Thunderstorm")
