= Irene Mawela =

South African singer and composer (born 1940)

- Born: 3 March 1940 (age 86); Soweto, South Africa
- Genres: World, African, Mbaqanga
- Occupation: Singer
- Instrument: Vocals
- Years active: 1957– present
- Labels: EMI, Troubadour Records, Trutone Records, Teal, Gallo-Mavuthela, Umsakazo Records

Matodzi Irene Mawela (born 3 March 1940) is a South African singer and composer who has been active since the late 1950s. She is known primarily for her contributions to mbaqanga music and songs made in the Tshivenda language, and has contributed to an estimated 1,000 studio recordings and radio transcriptions.

== Biography ==
Mawela was born and raised in a Venda family in Soweto, South Africa, but due to the denigration of the Venda tribe during apartheid rule, she attended a Sesotho-language school. In her teens, she joined a girl group named The Sweet Voices, which was spotted performing at a wedding by talent scout Rupert Bopape. At 17, she signed a contract with Bopape, then a producer for EMI South Africa, and began composing and recording for the inaugural line-up of the Dark City Sisters and a young Simon Nkabinde, not yet famous as Mahlathini. In 1962, she moved to Troubadour Records and joined the popular female group The Sweet Sixteens, as well as backing artists including Dixie Kwankwa and Mabel Mafuya.

Mawela was the first recording artist to make popular music recordings in Tshivenda. Artists were initially forbidden to compose songs in Tshivenda and Xitsonga, which were considered unmarketable languages by the commercial recording industry. Much of Mawela's early work was made in isiZulu and Sesotho. In the mid-1960s, Mawela finally persuaded record executives to allow her to gauge the market with one Tshivenda single, which was a commercial success. Much of her material was released on 78 and 45 rpm recordings, later compiled into 33 rpm LP releases.

In the early 1970s, Mawela joined Gallo Africa's Mavuthela subsidiary. She made recordings with the likes of the Mahotella Queens, Izintombi Zomoya, Mgababa Queens, Abafana Baseqhudeni, Jacob 'Mpharanyana' Radebe, Patience Africa, Ray Phiri, Stimela and Ladysmith Black Mambazo. During this era, Mawela was a major contributor to the development of mbaqanga music, alongside soul, disco, maskandi and gospel recordings. She was awarded the coveted Nambi ya Dzinambi (Best Artist) award from the SABC/Radio Venda in 1982, 1983 and 1984, in addition to 2nd Best Song for her singles "Abakhulu" in 1974 and "Hao Nkarabe" in 1984. Mawela also freelanced with the SABC, making more than two dozen transcription unreleased recordings for airplay.

Mawela reduced her involvement in the music industry in the late 1980s and 1990s as she concentrated on raising her family in Limpopo. She returned to the recording industry in the 21st century, coinciding with a number of honours including the National Heritage Council's National Living Treasure award, numerous honours from the South African Department of Arts and Culture, a 2012 TSHIMA Awards Lifetime Achievement Award and an honorary doctorate from the University of Pretoria. In April 2023, Mawela was bestowed with the prestigious Order of Ikhamanga from President Cyril Ramaphosa in the 2023 South African National Orders.

== Selected discography ==
- 1982: Khanani Yanga
- 1983: Mme Anga Khotsi Anga
- 1983: Hao Nkarabe
- 2004: O Mohau
- 2007: Tlhokomela Sera
- 2012: Africa 5
- 2016: Pembelani
- 2017: Ari Pembele: Let's Rejoice
- 2019: The Best of the SABC Years (1982–88)
