= Jaiva =

South African musical style and genre

- Other names: Township jive, Soweto jive, Soweto sound, Soweto beat
- Stylistic origins: Mbaqanga, kwaito, Western pop music
- Cultural origins: 1940s – early 1990s, South Africa

Jaiva, Township jive (TJ), Soweto jive, Soweto sound or Soweto beat is a subgenre of South African township music and African dance form that influenced Western breakdance and emerged from the shebeen culture of the apartheid-era townships.

== Influences and particularity ==
While closely associated with mbaqanga, township jive more broadly incorporates influences from mariba and kwaito, and is synonymous with none of these. To the extent that marabi influences TJ, it may be somewhat sanitised as TJ broke into the international commercial arena.

== Emergence in world music circles ==
The Boyoyo Boys received additional press coverage when Malcolm McLaren allegedly plagiarised their song "Puleng" and released it as the hit "Double Dutch", capitalising on the emergence of breakdance and hip-hop.

Additional momentum for world beat attention to South African music developed as a result of international attention to the demise of apartheid and Nelson Mandela's 70th birthday concert in Wembley Stadium, London in 1988.

== History ==
According to Ambrose Ehirim, a US-based Nigeria specialist, township music dates to the 1950s when it was proscribed by South African police. This has been contradicted by anti-apartheid activist/musician Johnny Clegg, who has claimed that "by the 1960s, the development of mbaqanga hadn't even really started". Mbaqanga (or umbaquanga) has been characterised as urban pop music "with high-pitched, choppy guitar and a powerful bass line" influenced by "funk, reggae, American R&B, soul and drawing on South African Marabi, gospel music". It draws on both kwela and marabi.

Township Jive is closely associated with the development of mbaqanga but is more closely associated with emergent international trends and not as insular and rooted in tradition. Christopher Ballantine traces the "shift from imitating American jazz to localizing the sound with African features. This he connects to the emergence of the ideology of New Africanism". While the international market was absorbing Township Jive under the swirl of commercial activity culminating in the McLaren copyright infringement lawsuit, the subsequent release of BBoys' new album was preferred by a more elite audience closely associated with the black diaspora consciousness movements.

== Globalization ==
The homogenisation of Township Jive with US and UK culture, due to globalisation, is viewed by African artists as a threat to the preservation of their local tradition and credibility. Thus, artists focus on maintaining an emotional link between customer and brand. This explains why transnational corporations are much less interested in homogenising or Americanizing kwaito music because true kwaito represents and dictates South African experience. Americanizing kwaito, as is many artists' opinion, can potentially dilute the substance kwaito was originally based on.

On the upside, critical awareness of TJ has enhanced appreciation of fusion artists and others influenced by its style. For instance, Vibration Bookings bills its artist Nomfusi as a proponent of "a new style where South African Township Jive ("Jaiva") meets Motown". And the Boyoyo Boys have, subsequent to the copyright scandal, signed by Rounder Records which released TJ Today in 1998.

== See also ==
- Noise Khanyile
- Mahlathini
- Mahotella Queens
- Ladysmith Black Mambazo
- Sweet Honey in the Rock
- Kwaito

== Additional scholarly references ==
- Charles Hamm (1987). Review of David B. Coplan 'In Township Tonight! South Africa's Black City Music and Theatre', Popular Music, 6, pp. 352–355 doi:10.1017/S0261143000002427
- THE SOCIAL HISTORY OF CAPE TOWN Cape Town: The Making of a City: An Illustrated Social History. Edited by Nigel Worden, Elizabeth van Heyningen and Vivian Bickford-Smith. Cape Town: David Philip, 1998. Pp. 283. Rand 250 (ISBN 0-86486-435-3).
- Cape Town in the Twentieth Century: An Illustrated Social History. Edited by Nigel Worden, Elizabeth van Heyningen and Vivian Bickford-Smith. Cape Town: David Philip, 1999. Pp. 255. Rand 225 (ISBN 0-86486-384-5).
- David Copeland, Cape Town, 1994: Operation and impact of Musical Action for People's Progress in disadvantaged communities in the Cape Flats
- David Copeland, 1985 In township tonight! South Africa's black city music and theatre. London; New York: Longman; Johannesburg: Raven Press, 1985. (French edition, published in 1990 by Karthala)
- Barbara Browning (1998) Infectious Rhythm: Metaphors of Contagion and the Spread of African Culture [Paperback] Routledge
- Louise Meintjes' Sound of Africa (2003)
- Gwen Ansell's Soweto Blues (2004).
