= Buya Buya: Come Back =

Studio album by Mahotella Queens
- Released: 25 July 2025
- Studios: DownTown Music Hub, Johannesburg
- Genre: Mbaqanga
- Length: 59 mins
- Label: Umsakazo Records
- Producer: Nick Lotay

Mahotella Queens chronology
Siyadumisa (Songs of Praise) (2007)	Buya Buya: Come Back (2025)

Professional ratings
Review scores
Source	Rating
AllMusic	4.5/5 stars
GQ	favorable
Klassekampen	4.5/6 stars
Robert Christgau	A
Tom Hull	A-
RNR	favorable
Songlines	4/5 stars
Woxx	favorable

Buya Buya: Come Back is an album by the South African mbaqanga female group Mahotella Queens, released on 25 July 2025. It is the group's first album of new material since 2007 and their debut recording for the UK-based label Umsakazo Records. The release of Buya Buya: Come Back coincided with a concert tour of Japan, the Queens' first overseas performances since 2019, in which they headlined the 18th annual World Music and Dance Festival in Hakodate, Hokkaido, in addition to performing several gigs in Tokyo and Kobe.

== Track listing ==
Buya Buya: Come Back track listing
No.	Title	Writer(s)	Length
1.	"Jomba Jomba (Jump To The Music)"	Hilda Tloubatla	4:42
2.	"Buya Buya (Come Back)"	Hilda Tloubatla; Ethel Mngomezulu	3:51
3.	"Ngibuz'indlela (Show Me The Way)"	Hilda Tloubatla	4:31
4.	"Mpho Ke Lehlohonolo (Take Care Of Your Gift)"	Hilda Tloubatla	5:20
5.	"Phephezela (Wedding Dance)"	Nobesuthu Mbadu	5:17
6.	"Šalang (Farewell)"	Hilda Tloubatla	5:02
7.	"Thoko, Ujola Nobani? (Thoko, Who Are You Dating?)"	Nunu Maseko	4:25
8.	"Mma Ditaba (Gossipmonger)"	Hilda Tloubatla	4:39
9.	"Uyeke Amanga (Stop Your Lies)"	Mildred Mangxola	4:40
10.	"Ba Ntshepisa Lenyalo (I'm Tired Of Your Promises)"	Hilda Tloubatla	5:29
11.	"Nkhono Le Ntate-Moholo (My Grandparents)"	Hilda Tloubatla	5:14
12.	"Laduma Lamthatha (The Thunder Roars)"	Traditional arr. Hilda Tloubatla	5:20

== Personnel ==
Credits adapted from Bandcamp.

- Hilda Tloubatla – lead singer
- Amanda Nkosi – alto
- Mildred Mangxola and Nonku Maseko – tenors
- Nick Lotay – lead guitar (1, 2, 7), keyboards, drums and percussion
- Kagiso ‘Boikie’ Monampana – lead guitar (3–6, 8–12) and rhythm guitar
- Madoda Ntshingila – bass guitar (2–6, 7, 8)
- Celumusa Zuma – bass guitar (1, 9–12)
- Jack Lerole Jnr – pennywhistle (6)
- Produced, arranged and mixed by Nick Lotay
- Co-produced by Hilda Tloubatla
- Recorded by Mzamo Ndlovu at DownTown Music Hub, Johannesburg
- Overdubs recorded by Mazwe Mtetwa at MasterMyMix Studios, Johannesburg
- Mastered by Mazwe Mtetwa
- Coordination: Norton Ramavhoya and Vanessa Tloubatla
- Photography: Success Seleke

== Release history ==
Region	Date	Format	Label	Ref.
Worldwide	25 July 2025	CD; cassette; digital download; streaming	Umsakazo Records	
Worldwide	15 September 2025	vinyl	Umsakazo Records	
