= Mathaka Vol 1 =

Studio album by Makgona Tsohle Band
- Released: 1983
- Recorded: 1983
- Genre: Mbaqanga
- Length: 40:00 approx.
- Label: Gallo Record Company
- Producer: West Nkosi

Makgona Tsohle Band chronology
The Webb (1977)	Mathaka Vol 1 (1983)	Kotopo Vol 2 (1983)

Mathaka Vol 1 is a 1983 album by the Makgona Tsohle Band, the instrumental backing group for Mahlathini and the Mahotella Queens, all of whom were based as musicians in the Mavuthela Music subsidiary of Gallo Africa.

Mathaka Vol 1 was the first album by the Makgona Tsohle Band after reuniting in early 1983 - they had disbanded circa 1977, though each member continued to work in the music industry, either as session musicians, producers, or a combination of the two. Both guitarist Marks Mankwane and saxophonist West Nkosi became musician-producers; Nkosi in particular became one of the top producers at Mavuthela, producing acts such as Ladysmith Black Mambazo, Mpharanyana, and Amaswazi Emvelo among others, whilst Mankwane produced other high-selling groups like Abafana Baseqhudeni and Walter and the Beggers, in addition to being the sole mentor and arranger for the popular Mahotella Queens.

The idea to reunite came as a result of Nkosi's clinching a deal with the SABC to co-produce a possible television series for the newly introduced black service in the country. Nkosi got the idea of five friends working as auto-mechanics in a township garage, playing their music whenever the garage owner left the building. As such, Nkosi and his Makgona Tsohle Bandmates Marks Mankwane, Joseph Makwela, Vivian Ngubane, and Lucky Monama, were the stars of the soap opera/musical comedy, Mathaka. The success of Mathaka led to Nkosi issuing this release.

Mathaka Vol 1 contained 1983 re-recordings of the band's 1960s and 1970s mbaqanga "heyday" hits, such as "Two Mabone", "Sikhulekile", "Vula Bops" and "Kupa Marama" (though none of the songs from this album were ever performed in the series). Also included is a recording of the popular tune "A Tear Fell".

The album was followed up the same year with Kotopo Vol 2 (which was composed entirely of songs that were performed in the series).

== Track listing ==
1. "A Tear Fell" (Comp: Burton/Randolph)
2. "Two Mabone" (Nkosi)
3. "Kalamazoo" (Nkosi)
4. "Sikhulekile" (Mankwane)
5. "Vula Bops" (Nkosi)
6. "2 By 2" (Nkosi)
7. "Duba Duba" (Nkosi)
8. "17 Mabone" (Nkosi)
9. "Tsatsawane" (Nkosi)
10. "Stokvel Jive No. 1" (Nkosi)
11. "Kupa Marama" (Mankwane)
12. "X 14" (Makwela)
