= Tsamaya Moratuoa =

Studio album by Mahotella Queens
- Released: 17 March 1980
- Recorded: February 1980
- Genre: Mbaqanga
- Length: 40:00 approx.
- Label: Gallo Record Company
- Producer: Marks Mankwane

Mahotella Queens chronology
The Best Of The Mahotella Queens (1978)	Tsamaya Moratuoa (1980)	Mathaka Vol 1 (1983)

Tsamaya Moratuoa is a 1980 album by South African female band Mahotella Queens. The album was one of the first to feature a more modern form of mbaqanga, implementing a 1980s drum backing with solid drumsticks (and not with brushes, as had been the case in the 1960s and part of the 1970s). The album featured songs such as "Tsamaya Moratuoa," "Mpulele," "Re Basadi Kaofela" and the Sotho-traditional hymn "Seteng Sediba" (which was covered by the Soweto Gospel Choir in 2006).

== Track listing ==
1. "Tsamaya Moratuoa"
2. "Tshoara Khaitsedi"
3. "Mokgadi O Fihlile"
4. "Ke Utloile"
5. "Mmina Tau"
6. "Mpulele"
7. "Re Basadi Kaofela"
8. "Maqaqailana"
9. "Maile"
10. "Tsoela Fela Ngoanana"
11. "Ha Bo Tle"
12. "Seteng Sediba"

== Personnel ==
- Mahotella Queens
  - Emily Zwane
  - Hazel Zwane
  - Caroline Kapentar
  - Irene Mawela
  - Thandi Nkosi
- Producer: Marks Mankwane
- Engineer: Greg Cutler/Phil Audoire
- Published by Mavuthela Music Co.
- Gallo Record Company
