= The Rough Guide to the Music of South Africa (1998 album) =

1998 compilation album by various artists

Compilation album by Various artists
- Released: 27 January 1998
- Genre: World, South African
- Length: 70:27
- Label: World Music Network

Full series chronology
| African Blues (1998) | The Rough Guide to the Music of South Africa (1998) | The Rough Guide to the Music of Brazil (1998) |

The Rough Guide to the Music of South Africa is a world music compilation album originally released in 1998. Part of the World Music Network Rough Guides series, the album spotlights the music of South Africa. Liner notes were written by Tom Andrews and Rob Allingham, a discographer and music historian specializing in South Africa. Phil Stanton, co-founder of the World Music Network, was the producer. This was the first of two similarly named albums: the second edition, featuring approximately half of the same artists, was released in 2007.

== Critical reception ==
Professional ratings
Review scores
| Source | Rating |
|---|---|
| Allmusic | 4/5 stars |

Raymond McKinney of AllMusic wrote that "newcomers would find much to savour" in the album.

== Track listing ==
| No. | Title | Artist | Length |
|---|---|---|---|
| 1. | "Nigizongena Kanjani" | Izingqungqulu Zomhlaba | 5:12 |
| 2. | "Nyamphemphe" | Mahlathini and the Mahotella Queens | 4:17 |
| 3. | "Groovin' Jive No. 1" | Noise Khanyile & the Jo'Burg City Stars | 8:09 |
| 4. | "House of Exile" | Lucky Dube | 3:25 |
| 5. | "Motherland" | Yvonne Chaka Chaka | 4:52 |
| 6. | "My Kind of Jazz" | Tebogo | 4:00 |
| 7. | "Meva" | Spokes Mashiyane | 2:52 |
| 8. | "Jive Township" | African Jazz Pioneers | 4:01 |
| 9. | "Yaze Yangala" | Elite Swingsters | 4:40 |
| 10. | "Celebration" | Bheki Mseleku | 7:50 |
| 11. | "Ungithatha Kanjani" | West Nkosi | 4:19 |
| 12. | "Udlame (Misbehaving Woman)" | The Soul Brothers | 4:07 |
| 13. | "Tsotsi" | The Boyoyo Boys | 2:33 |
| 14. | "Inkomo Zodwa" | Miriam Makeba & the Skylarks | 2:20 |
| 15. | "Mbube" | Solomon Linda | 2:42 |
| 16. | "Kangivumanga" | Ladysmith Black Mambazo | 5:08 |
