= Makgona Tsohle Band =

South African instrumental band

The Makgona Tsohle Band was a South African instrumental band that is noted for creating the mbaqanga music style. Mbaqanga is an acculturated popular South African music that emerged in the 19th century. Mbaqanga is also referred to as township jive. The group was formed in 1964 at Mavuthela (the 'black music' division of Gallo Record Company), and became the Mavuthela house band. It garnered success by backing fellow Mavuthela-Gallo stars, Mahlathini and the Mahotella Queens. It is often referred to as the South African equivalent to Motown's The Funk Brothers.

== History ==
=== Origins: 1956 – 1964 ===
The individual band members were all domestic workers from Pretoria. West Nkosi, born in Nelspruit in 1940, was sent to live with his grandfather in Pretoria at the age of 16 to find employment. Nkosi found work as a market porter, and then as a house servant, in 1957. During his off-hours, Nkosi played meticulous pennywhistle kwela tunes outside sports centres or on the streets, in awe of his idol Spokes Mashiyane, who at that time was a great kwela star. Two fellow domestic workers, Joseph Makwela and Lucky Monama, happened to see Nkosi playing. In awe of his music, Makwela and Monama persuaded Nkosi to teach them how to play rhythmic music. Not long afterwards, they formed their own group The Pretoria Tower Boys, with three more members. Nkosi was on pennywhistle (though he changed to saxophone in the early 1960s), as was Monama, with Makwela on guitar. The Tower Boys sometimes encountered another pennywhistle group, led by talented guitarist Marks Mankwane, who hailed from the Warmbaths area. Nkosi said to his band members to look out for Mankwane, who was a very polished musician, having played guitar since he was 12 years old.

Eventually, Nkosi travelled to Johannesburg in 1962 with Monama and Makwela, all of them hoping to join the recording industry. They ended up as session musicians for Gallo Record Company, playing in producer Reggie Msomi's line-up the Hollywood Jazz Band (Nkosi was now on saxophone, Monama was now on drums, whilst Makwela had made history by becoming the first black electric bassist in South Africa). In mid-1963, Msomi took them on a tour of Northern Rhodesia, which was to become Zambia; however, the tour ended up being a disaster, as political turmoil prevented the group's audiences attending their concerts. As a result they were stranded there for six months. When they returned to Gallo in Johannesburg, they found that it had been severely reorganised.

=== The salad days: 1963 – 1977 ===
Whilst Msomi and the Jazz Band had been in Zambia, Gallo management took it as an opportunity to replace him and bring sales in (what was then called) their 'black music' production higher. They enticed the massively successful EMI South Africa producer/talent scout Rupert Bopape to take over Msomi's role. Bopape, who had successes with the high-selling acts the Dark City Sisters and Alexandra Black Mambazo in the 1950s, set up a new Gallo subsidiary devoted to black music – Mavuthela Music Company, in early 1964. When the Jazz Band returned, they found that Bopape had recruited two new migrant musicians – one of them was Vivian Ngubane, a rhythm guitarist, and the other was none other than Marks Mankwane, their old acquaintance from Pretoria, who was now forging a completely new type of up-tempo electric guitar playing highly different from the old kwela and marabi jazz stylings. Makwela, Nkosi, and Monama all auditioned for Mavuthela, and entered the studio in mid-1964. During a "jam" after a rigorous jazz recording session, the five musicians (Mankwane, Nkosi, Makwela, Monama, and Ngubane) ended up forming a brand new style of music – a style that combined marabi with kwela, and the modern (electric instruments) with the old (traditional Zulu, Sotho, and Xhosa sounds). Bopape, having witnessed this, decided to reorganise the division and group the five men together into what he called the Makgona Tsohle Band. The year of formation was 1963. Their new music was named mbaqanga, after a traditional snack made in the rural areas (this term was originally a derogatory name; it eventually became the genre's main name).

To promote them, he formed a new group of female vocalists and paired them with Makgona Tsohle. To front the act, he brought in a young, shy, deep-voiced, "groaner" called Simon Mahlathini Nkabinde. This pairing of mbaqanga with vocals became known as "mgqashiyo", meaning "to bounce", after the "bouncy" rhythms of the style. The female vocalists were released under different names, such as Izintombi Zomgqashiyo, The Dima Sisters, and the Mahotella Queens; the first two biggest selling Mavuthela singles had both been pressed with the same name, Mahotella Queens, so that was the pseudonym that became etched in the public's memory as the group's name. Not long after, the combination of Mahlathini and the Mahotella Queens with the Makgona Tsohle Band was thrilling audiences around the world and in Africa.

For the remainder of the 1960s and most of the 1970s, the Queens and Makgona Tsohle remained extremely productive and popular, despite some large member changes in the Queens line-up. However, when Rupert Bopape suffered a stroke in 1977 and retired, his former charges – Marks Mankwane, West Nkosi, and Lucky Monama, all of them part-time Mavuthela producers – were ready to become full-time producers. This led to Makgona Tsohle disbanding, with a simultaneous faltering of the Mahotella Queens popularity, with disco and soul eclipsing local mbaqanga sounds.

=== Reunion and international popularity: 1983 – 1999 ===
South Africa's first television station aimed at black audiences, TV3 (now known as SABC 1), was launched in 1982. This led to West Nkosi, Mavuthela's top producer, forming a partnership with local studio Trilion Entertainment, in the hope of producing a new TV series about the still-famous Makgona Tsohle Band. Eventually, in 1983, the project came to fruition: Mathaka, a brand-new soap opera/musical comedy featuring the members playing characters who worked in a garage, playing their music during breaks. The series was massively popular with black audiences, who tuned in by the dozens. Nkosi organised the release of two LPs to coincide with the series, Mathaka Vol 1 and Kotopo Vol 2.

Despite the Mathaka series' popularity, the band members complained about insufficient pay. Unfortunately, the show was cancelled in 1984. However, another phase was in store for Makgona Tsohle: Marks Mankwane, for years the Mahotella Queens' sole producer, regrouped the original Mahotella Queens (Hilda Tloubatla, Nobesuthu Mbadu, Mildred Mangxola, Ethel Mngomezulu, and Juliet Mazamisa) with Mahlathini. This reunion resulted in the Mahlathini-Queens-Makgona Tsohle comeback album Amaqhawe Omgqashiyo, which sold highly.

Paul Simon's collaborations with South African artists in 1986 for his Graceland album led to a worldwide interest in African music, leading to artists such as the world-famous Ladysmith Black Mambazo as well as Miriam Makeba and Hugh Masekela gaining huge popularity abroad. To fulfil the growing demand, West Nkosi organised a new album between Mahlathini, three of the Queens (Tloubatla, Mbadu, and Mangxola), and Makgona Tsohle. The result was the 1987 Thokozile, which saw the group's popularity escalate out of South Africa, leading to countless world tours, television appearances, and several requests for personal appearances.

In August 1998, still producing influential acts, West Nkosi was caught in a large car accident whilst driving home from the studios. He was left paralysed in hospital before dying in October that year. On the very day of his funeral, Marks Mankwane died due to complications from diabetes. The following year, groaner Mahlathini also died, thus ending the Makgona Tsohle Band's existence.

The Mahotella Queens were left in mourning following the deaths of their close friends and bandmates. However, they decided to relaunch their act with newer backing musicians, hoping to keep Nkosi, Mankwane, and Mahlathini's spirits alive. They have been praised for their albums post-Mahlathini, which include Sebai Bai (2000), Bazobuya (2004), Kazet (2006), and Siyadumisa (2007). The Queens' backing now includes Victor Mkize (lead guitar), James Nkosi (drums), and Arnold Jackie Mokoatlo (keyboards).

== See also ==
- Mahlathini and the Mahotella Queens
- Ladysmith Black Mambazo
- Sweet Honey in the Rock
