= Tebogo =

- Gender: feminine or masculine

Origin
- Region of origin: Africa

Tebogo (also spelled Teboho/Thebukgo) is a given name or surname of Tswana and Sotho origin popular in southern African countries.

== Notable people with the given name ==
- Tebogo Ditshego, South African CEO
- Tebogo Langerman, South African soccer player
- Tebogo Letsie, South African politician
- Tebogo Jacko Magubane (born 1982), South African music producer
- Tebogo Makobela (born 1992), South African professional soccer player
- Tebogo Mamathu (born 1995), South African sprinter
- Tebogo Mamorobela, South African politician
- Tebogo Mashego, South African entrepreneur and industrialist
- Tebogo Masire, Motswana general
- Tebogo Moerane, South African footballer
- Tebogo Modise (born 1969), South African politician
- Tebogo Moerane, South African footballer
- Tebogo Mokwele, South African politician
- Tebogo Mokwena (born 1988), South African cricketer
- Tebogo Monyai, South African soccer player
- Tebogo Mothusi, Motswana footballer
- Tebogo Potsane, South African soccer player
- Tebogo Sembowa, Motswana footballer
- Tebogo Sosome, Motswana footballer
- Tebogo Tau, President of the Court of Appeal of Botswana
- Tebogo Tlolane, South African soccer player

== Notable people with the surname ==
- Letsile Tebogo (born 2003), Sprinter from Botswana

== Notable people with the middle name ==
- Nnaniki Wilhemina Tebogo Makwinja, Motswana politician
- Louis Tebogo Moholo (1940–2025), South African jazz drummer
- Prudence Tebogo Sekgodiso (born 2002), South African middle-distance runner
