= Siyadumisa (Songs of Praise) =

Studio album by Mahotella Queens
- Released: May 2007
- Recorded: 2007
- Genre: Mbaqanga, Mgqashiyo, Gospel
- Length: 40:00 approx.
- Label: Bula Music/AS Entertainment
- Producer: Jabu Sibumbe, Ian Osrin

Mahotella Queens chronology
Kazet (2006)	Siyadumisa (Songs of Praise) (2007)	Buya Buya: Come Back (2025)

Siyadumisa (Songs of Praise) is a 2007 album by the South African mbaqanga group the Mahotella Queens. The album is the first gospel-orientated album by the Queens, and features the voice of lead singer Hilda Tloubatla's son, Alfred "Ali" Temo. The album was released in May 2007 in South Africa on the Bula Music label, and was a joint venture between Bula and AS Entertainment (the Queens' management).

During the making of the album, the group's bass guitarist Madoda Ntshingila was injured in a car accident, and at the last minute the acclaimed bassist Jabu Sibumbe was hired to replace Ntshingila. The Queens had also recruited a new lead guitarist, John Papo, whom they described as "very beautiful, when he plays guitar he is just like Marks Mankwane". Papo died after only a week recording on the album.

Songs on the album include "Ebenezer" (the opening song to the Queens' concerts) and "Usathane Uyadelela" ("Satan Is Wayward") as well as a re-recording of "Bonang Suna", a song the Queens originally recorded in the late 1980s. Also included are several Zulu hymns rearranged by the Queens into a gospel-mbaqanga style.

== Track listing ==
1. "Umlingi" (Comp.: Nobesuthu Mbadu)
2. "Lenjabulo" (Comp.: Traditional / Mildred Mangxola)
3. "Bonang Suna" (Comp.: Hilda Tloubatla)
4. "Ebenezer" (Comp.: Hilda Tloubatla)
5. "Usathane Uyadelela" (Comp.: Traditional / Mildred Mangxola)
6. "Thixo Bawo" (Comp.: Traditional / Mildred Mangxola)
7. "Batswarele" (Comp.: Hilda Tloubatla)
8. "Kheth'eyakho" (Comp.: Traditional / Mildred Mangxola)
9. "Siza Ubenami" (Comp.: Nobesuthu Mbadu)
10. "Sisho Udumo" (Comp.: Traditional / Hilda Tloubatla)
11. "Umkhwezeli" (Comp.: Traditional / Nobesuthu Mbadu)
12. "It Is Well" (Comp.: Traditional / Hilda Tloubatla)

== Personnel ==
=== Musicians ===
- The Mahotella Queens
  - Hilda Tloubatla (vocals)
  - Nobesuthu Mbadu (vocals)
  - Mildred Mangxola (vocals)
- Alfred Temo (backing vocals)
- John Papo (lead guitar)
- Jabu Sibumbe (bass guitar)
- Shadrack Rameya (keyboards)
- Thuthukani Cele (keyboards)
- Bethuel Mbonana (drums)
- Godfrey Mgcina (percussions)

=== Other ===
- Engineer: Dan Gimpel
- Producers: Jabu Sibumbe, Ian Osrin
- Published by: Gallo Music Publishing SA
