= Mahlathini =

South African mbaqanga singer

- Simon 'Mahlathini' Nkabinde, 1988

Background information
- Born: Simon Mahlathini Nkabinde; 1937 or 1938; Newcastle, Natal, Union of South Africa
- Died: 27 July 1999 (aged 62) Johannesburg, Gauteng, South Africa
- Genres: Mbaqanga
- Occupation: Musician
- Instrument: Vocals
- Years active: 1964-1999

Simon "Mahlathini" Nkabinde (1937 or 1938 – 27 July 1999) was a South African mbaqanga singer. Known as the "Lion of Soweto", Nkabinde is the acknowledged exponent of the deep-voiced, basso profundo "groaning" style that came to symbolize mbaqanga music in the 1960s. Nkabinde was also a very active live performer in South Africa, recording and performing with the Mahotella Queens and the backing Makgona Tsohle Band from 1964 to 1971, and then again from 1983 to 1999. The Mahlathini and the Mahotella Queens act was propelled into international stardom in the wake of Paul Simon's 1986 Graceland album.

== Early career and life ==
Nkabinde was born in Newcastle, KwaZulu-Natal and grew up in Alexandra, Gauteng. As a young boy, he began leading isicathamiya and mbube choirs at traditional Zulu wedding ceremonies. By the time he was a teenager, Nkabinde's voice was much admired. During the early 1950s, however, his voice became strained and was reduced to a growl. Initially, Nkabinde's rural parents thought he had been "witched", and took him to a sangoma. When the healer provided the simple explanation that Nkabinde was only "growing up", Nkabinde's parents put their minds at rest. Nkabinde himself joined the kwela group Alexandra Black Mambazo (from which the Ladysmith choir would later take its name), among the members his older brother Zeph and Aaron "Big Voice Jack" Lerole, the originator of the singing style later known as "groaning". In the later 1950s, Nkabinde joined the "black music" division of EMI, led by prolific talent scout and producer Rupert Bopape, and began recording with female artists such as the Dark City Sisters and the Flying Jazz Queens. His growling voice perfectly suited the groaning vocal style, and he soon became the leading exponent of the style. His vocal rendition was to inspire a whole generation of groaners (none of whom outlasted Nkabinde).

== Professional career ==
In 1964, Rupert Bopape was lured away from EMI to Gallo Record Company. He founded the Mavuthela Music Company, Gallo's new black music division, and took with him a number of musicians from his old stable including Nkabinde. The Mavuthela house band, later named the Makgona Tsohle Band, comprised lead guitarist Marks Mankwane, electric bassist Joseph Makwela, rhythm guitarist Vivian Ngubane, drummer Lucky Monama, and aspiring producer-saxophonist West Nkosi. The Band added a more traditional and electric tinge to the mbaqanga music that had been locally famous for some years. Bopape formed a set group of about ten female singers, among them Hilda Tloubatla, Juliet Mazamisa, Ethel Mngomezulu, Nobesuthu Mbadu and Mildred Mangxola, who were to provide all the "girl group" recordings at Mavuthela, recording over and over again under many different names. Nkabinde was placed as Mavuthela's regular groaner. The most well-known name ended up being "Mahotella Queens", and it was under this name that the Mavuthela vocal team, fronted by Nkabinde's searing groaning vocals, became highly popular and productive.

The 1960s and 1970s were the salad days for Nkabinde and his associated acts. He scored hits on Mavuthela's Motella and Gumba Gumba with very popular numbers including "Sithunyiwe" ("We Have Been Sent", later recorded as "Thokozile" in 1986), "Umoya" ("The Wind"), "Imbodlomane" ("Groaner"), and "Bantwanyana" ("Children", later recorded as "Nina Majuba" in 1986). Nkabinde's success was represented by his national nickname, "Indoda Mahlathini" ("Mahlathini the main man"), and he made thousands upon thousands of concert appearances alongside the Mahotella Queens and the Makgona Tsohle Band.

In 1971, Nkabinde fell out with Bopape and left Gallo-Mavuthela, joining Satbel Record Company under producer Cambridge Matiwane. He recorded with a new female troupe called "The Mahlathini Queens" and a new backing band, "The Mahlathini Guitar Band" (also known as "Indlondlo Bashise"). He scored equal success at Satbel, mostly due to his already-famous moniker and impressive stage presence, and remained very popular throughout the 1970s. However, towards the latter 1970s, soul and disco styles were beginning to take over from mbaqanga as the most popular form of music. Nkabinde continued to churn out mbaqanga material but saw his popularity decline. Mbaqanga-soul became the preferred format, but Nkabinde refused to commercialise and scored little success.

== Comeback and international success ==
By 1983, mbaqanga was being slowly revived after having almost fallen out of favour. This was due to the addition of a more modern drum beat and the highly publicised reunion of the Makgona Tsohle Band, which had disbanded in the late '70s due to the new producer responsibilities of its members (see Makgona Tsohle Band article, reunion section for more info). Nkabinde and the original five Mahotella Queens – Hilda Tloubatla, Juliet Mazamisa, Ethel Mngomezulu, Nobesuthu Mbadu and Mildred Mangxola – were reunited with the Makgona Tsohle Band. Their comeback album, Amaqhawe Omgqashiyo, sold very well, but the Queens line-up disintegrated after only a few more reunion releases. In their absence, Nkabinde managed, under various pseudonyms including "Mahlathini Nabo", to record a multitude of successful releases with the male vocal trio Amaswazi Emvelo. Many of his tracks also appeared on the groundbreaking British compilation The Indestructible Beat of Soweto.

By the early 1980s, Johnny Clegg and Sipho Mchunu's band Juluka had taken mbaqanga to a new audience with performances in the Good Hope Centre in Cape Town.

In 1986, Paul Simon's influential album and tour Graceland, in which he collaborated with several well-known black South African musicians including Ladysmith Black Mambazo, took place and proved to be the launching pad for a worldwide demand for what was later known as "world music". West Nkosi, by now Gallo-Mavuthela's top producer and the most musically-astute of the Makgona Tsohle Band, regrouped Nkabinde with three of the Mahotella Queens (Hilda Tloubatla, Nobesuthu Mbadu and Mildred Mangxola) to fulfil the demand for African music overseas.

The band recorded their comeback release Thokozile (1987), which was very well received internationally. They began touring for long stretches across the world, particularly in the United States, Europe, Asia and Australia, appearing in their own concerts and in events such as WOMAD. In France, the group became known for their song "Kazet" / "Gazette". They became further known to Western audiences through their 1989 collaborations with the experimental rock group Art of Noise on their album Below the Waste, particularly on the single "Yebo".

Mahlathini and the Mahotella Queens celebrated their 30th anniversary in 1994 with the album Stoki Stoki, issued internationally on Shanachie Records in 1996.

== Later years and death ==
The group performed their last live concert in 1997 due to Nkabinde's failing health, which had grown rapidly worse since the early 1990s. The team was struck a blow when West Nkosi, their saxophonist and producer until 1991, was killed in a car accident in late 1998. On the very day of Nkosi's funeral, their long-serving guitarist Marks Mankwane died as a result of complications from diabetes. At the start of 1999, the ailing Nkabinde and Mahotella Queens recorded what was to be their last album together, Umuntu, dedicated to Nkosi and Mankwane. Nkabinde's health deteriorated further during the course of the album's production (he appears on only five or six of the twelve songs of the album) and the future of the Mahlathini and the Mahotella Queens act was put in doubt. Nkabinde died in Johannesburg on 27 July 1999 due to complications from diabetes.

The three Mahotella Queens decided to return to the stage to help keep the music that Nkabinde had popularized alive. Forming a new backing band, the Queens paid tribute to Nkabinde and the Makgona Tsohle Band on their critically acclaimed album Sebai Bai (2001). The Queens have since released successful releases such as Bazobuya (2004), Reign & Shine (2005) and Siyadumisa (Songs of Praise) (2007), and continued to make concert appearances across the globe, particularly in Europe, to massive success.

== Legacy ==
In 2023, Rolling Stone ranked Mahlathini at number 153 on its list of the 200 Greatest Singers of All Time.

== See also ==
- Culture of South Africa
- Mahotella Queens
- Makgona Tsohle Band
- Ladysmith Black Mambazo

== Sources ==
- Mbaqanga – Mahlathini and the Mahotella Queens
- Amuzine – African Music Magazine – 31 October 2000
