= Ditshego =

Ditshego is a surname occurring in South Africa. Notable people with the surname include:

- Meme Ditshego (1965–2025), South African actress
- Tebogo Ditshego, South African business executive
