= The Indestructible Beat of Soweto =

Compilation album by various artists
- Released: April 16, 1985
- Recorded: 1981–1984
- Genre: Mbaqanga, maskanda, mqashiyo, isicathamiya
- Length: 45:42
- Label: Earthworks
- Producer: various

The Indestructible Beat of Soweto, later repackaged as The Indestructible Beat of Soweto Volume One, is a compilation album released in 1985 on the Earthworks label by Jumbo Vanrenen featuring musicians from South Africa, including Ladysmith Black Mambazo and Mahlathini. In 2020, it was ranked number 497 on Rolling Stone's 500 Greatest Albums of All Time.

== Overview ==
The album was conceived by white South African expatriates Trevor Herman and Jumbo Vanrenen and released in 1985 on the British-based Earthworks label. The following year it was released in the US by the Shanachie Records label. It features twelve tracks by artists from South Africa. The sleeve notes state that all songs are in the mbaqanga style, a guitar-based style popular at the time in the townships of Johannesburg and Durban, but the tracks actually cover four different styles, mbaqanga, mqashiyo, maskanda, and isicathamiya. The former two are the least traditional-sounding of the styles, while the latter two styles incorporate elements of urban and more rural music. Released prior to the more commercially successful Graceland by Paul Simon, it was one of the first albums of contemporary South African music to be widely available outside the country.

The album has been re-released several times and also spawned a succession of later volumes in the Indestructible Beat series, released by the Earthworks label.

== Critical reception ==
Professional ratings
Review scores
Source	Rating
AllMusic	5/5 stars
Spin Alternative Record Guide	10/10
The Village Voice	A+

The album was placed in the top 10 in the annual Pazz & Jop poll in the magazine The Village Voice. AllMusic calls it "an essential sampler of modern African styling, a revelation and a joy." Leading critic Robert Christgau gave it an A+ rating, and called it the most important record of the 1980s. It was ranked number 388 in Rolling Stone's original 500 Greatest Albums of All Time list, and ranked no. 497 in the updated version of the list published in 2020. Pitchfork ranked it number 159 in their 2018 list of "The 200 Best Albums of the 1980s", calling it a "palpable joy" with "[l]oping rhythms, flickering guitar riffs, and shimmering synth licks [that] back a dazzling array of groaning, ululating, harmonizing voices".

== Track listing ==
Side A

1. "Awungilobolele" (Can You Pay Lobola for Me) – Udokotela Shange Namajaha
2. "Holotelani" (Daughter-In-Law) – Nelcy Sedibe
3. "Qhude Manikiniki" (Fair Fight) – Umahlathini Nabo
4. "Indoda Yejazi Elimnyama" (The Man in the Black Coat) – Amaswazi Emvelo
5. "Emthonjeni Womculo" (The Stream of Music) – Mahlathini Nezintombi Zomgqashiyo and the Makgona Tsohle Band
6. "Sobabamba" (We Will Get Them) – Udokotela Shange Namajaha

Side B

1. "Qhwahilahle" (Leave Him Alone) – Moses Mchunu
2. "Thul'ulalele" (Just Stop and Listen) – Amaswazi Emvelo
3. "Sini Lindile" (We Are Waiting for You) – Nganezlyamfisa No Khambalomvaleliso
4. "Ngicabange Ngaqeda" (I Have Made Up My Mind) – Mahlathini Nezintombi Zomgqashiyo and the Makgona Tsohle Band
5. "Joyce No. 2" – Johnson Mkhalali
6. "Nansi Imali" (Here Is the Money) – Ladysmith Black Mambazo
