= Mbaqanga (album) =

- Original Australian CD

Studio album by Mahlathini and the Mahotella Queens
- Released: 1991
- Genre: Mbaqanga
- Length: 51:32
- Label: Verve World
- Producer: Marks Mankwane

Mahlathini and the Mahotella Queens chronology
The Lion Roars (1991)	Mbaqanga (1991)	King of the Groaners (1993)

Mbaqanga is an album by the South African musical group Mahlathini and the Mahotella Queens, released in 1991 and in the US in 1992. The group supported the album with a North American tour.

== Production ==
The album was produced by Marks Mankwane, who also played guitar. The group rerecorded a few early hits for Mbaqanga. The Makhona Tsohle Band played on the album. Mahlathini and the Mahotella Queens returned to the more traditional sound of their earlier albums; they also continued to shy away from political lyrics. The group sang in Zulu, Shangaan, and English, among other languages.

== Critical reception ==
Professional ratings
Review scores
Source	Rating
AllMusic	3/5 stars
Chicago Tribune	3.5/4 stars
Robert Christgau	(dud)
The Encyclopedia of Popular Music	3/5 stars
Houston Chronicle	3.5/5 stars
MusicHound World: The Essential Album Guide	4/5 stars

The Chicago Tribune noted Mankwane's influence, deeming the album "a leaner, rootsier record ... that is also more akin to current popular African guitar band styles." The Boston Globe praised the "less punched up, club-ready mix [that is] closer to a lighter, dustier, urban folk sound." The Sacramento Bee wrote: "While Simon Mahlathini Nkabinde's uncommon voice, low and gruff like Tom Waits' African cousin, is an acquired taste (that is, difficult to acquire), the three Queens are immediately ingratiating a bright, brassy ensemble that sings as one, reflecting their 28 years together."

The Globe and Mail determined that "the music remains unalloyed and uncorrupted, a joyous and irresistible sound that can light up a room in seconds." The Houston Chronicle considered the album "a good representation of Mahlathini and the Mahotella Queens' distinctive vocal blend of growling male leads ... and female harmonies." The Times Union labeled it "joyously buoyant."

AllMusic called the album "a nonstop frenzy of Zulu rock & roll."

== Track listing ==
No.	Title	Length
1.	"Mbaqanga"	4:27
2.	"Vuya"	4:11
3.	"Bayeza"	4:39
4.	"Umasihlalisane"	4:54
5.	"Jive Motella"	3:22
6.	"Thonthodi"	3:53
7.	"Hayi Kabi"	5:38
8.	"Stop Crying"	4:01
9.	"Bon Jour"	4:18
10.	"Josefa"	3:43
11.	"Noluthando"	4:29
12.	"Kwa Makhutha"	3:57
Total length:		51:32

== Charts ==
Chart performance for Mbaqanga
Chart (1991)	Peak position
Australian Albums (ARIA)	94
