= Gallotone Champion Guitar =

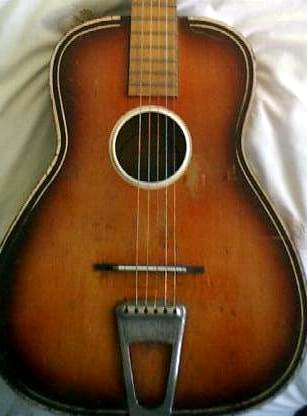
Gallotone Champion Guitar

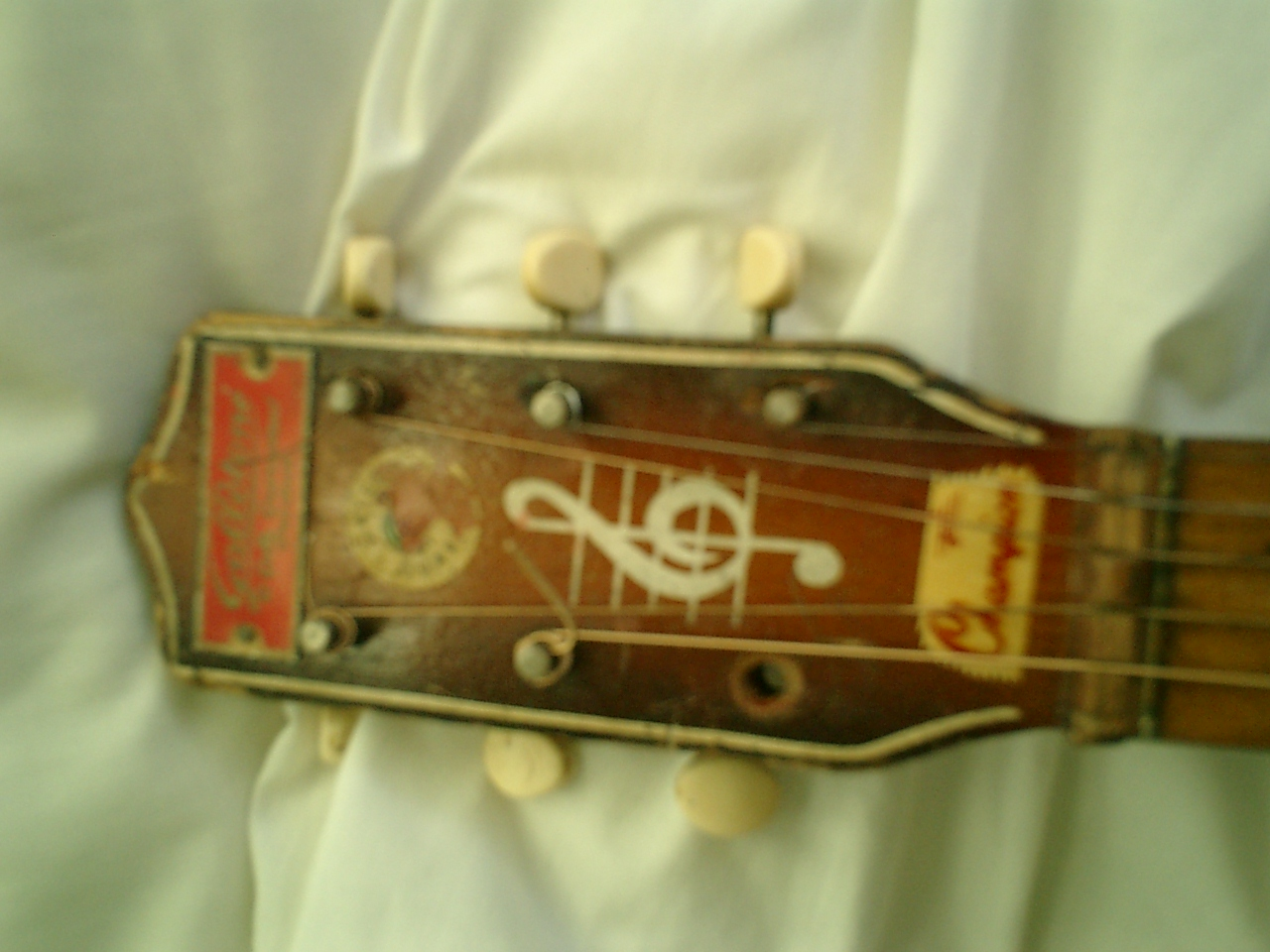
Headstock showing labels

The Gallotone Champion Guitar was an acoustic guitar manufactured in South Africa by the country's largest record company, Gallo Africa, during the 1950s and '60s. It was a cheaply made instrument intended for the beginner market and was exported to many countries.

The Champion model is a 3/4 size steel string flat-top acoustic made from laminated woods, and was "guaranteed not to split".

Perhaps the most famous of all Gallotone Champion players was John Lennon, whose guitar was sold for £155,500 ($251,700) at a "Rock'n'Roll" memorabilia sale by Sotheby's London in 1999. There is also a childhood photograph of Jimmy Page posed with a Gallotone Wonder.
