= The Rough Guide to the Music of Cuba (1998 album) =

Compilation album by Various artists
- Released: 27 January 1998
- Genre: World, Cuban
- Length: 73:16
- Label: World Music Network

Full series chronology
| The Rough Guide to the Music of Brazil (1998) | The Rough Guide to the Music of Cuba (1998) | Unwired: Acoustic Music from Around the World (1999) |

The Rough Guide to the Music of Cuba is a world music compilation album originally released in 1998. Part of the World Music Network Rough Guides series, the album spotlights the music of Cuba, with such genres as danzón, Cuban jazz, and son. Phil Stanton, co-founder of the World Music Network, produced the album. This was the first of two similarly named albums: the second edition was released in 2009.

== Critical reception ==
Professional ratings
Review scores
| Source | Rating |
|---|---|
| Allmusic | 4/5 stars |

The album received positive reviews. Writing for AllMusic, Adam Greenberg praised the diversity and quality of the tracks, calling it a "wonderful" starting-point, but mentioning that there are better choices for those pursuing specific genres. Michaelangelo Matos of the Chicago Reader compared the release to The Rough Guide to Salsa, calling this one "slower", "sexier", and "funkier".

== Track listing ==
| No. | Title | Artist | Length |
|---|---|---|---|
| 1. | "En Casa del Trompo No Bailes" | Orquesta Riverside | 3:27 |
| 2. | "Rucu Rucu a Santa Clara" | Irakere | 7:51 |
| 3. | "Santa Bárbara" | Celina González | 3:30 |
| 4. | "Un Meneíto Na' Más" | Vieja Trova Santiaguera | 3:08 |
| 5. | "A Orillas del Cauto" | Ñico Saquito | 6:06 |
| 6. | "Descarga en Faux" | Ritmo Y Candela | 5:37 |
| 7. | "Amiga Mia" | Los Van Van | 4:25 |
| 8. | "Oyelo Sonar" | Bellita Y Jazztumbatá | 5:12 |
| 9. | "Descarga Numero Dos" | Chico O'Farrill Y Allstars Cubano | 2:52 |
| 10. | "Mambo Rincon" | Mario Bauzá | 4:54 |
| 11. | "Dundunbanza" | Sierra Maestra | 5:06 |
| 12. | "Elegba" | Lázaro Ros | 2:26 |
| 13. | "El Vendedor de Agua" | La Familia Valera Miranda | 4:01 |
| 14. | "Alafia" | Conjunto Céspedes | 5:18 |
| 15. | "Caballo Viejo" | Estudiantina Invasora | 3:05 |
| 16. | "Tinguiti 'Ta Durmiendo" | Los Terry | 6:18 |
