= Mpharanyana =

South African singer-songwriter and guitarist (1948-1979)

Jacob Radebe, professionally known as Mpharanyana (16 April 1948 – 21 August 1979), was a South African singer-songwriter and guitarist. His music is often classified as jazz, fusion, disco, soul and mbaqanga. Radebe's compositions were primarily in Sesotho but he would occasionally sing in English.

== Career ==
Radebe was born in Katlehong in the East Rand and his interest in music was sparked at an early age. He was considered one of the most powerful voices in township soul. In Springs he performed with The Peddlars and in Katlehong he was the lead singer of The Weavelets. One of the members of this band was Lloyd Lelosa, who later played keyboards for Stimela. During the 60's until his death Radebe worked with a number of popular Southern African musicians including Ray Chikapa Phiri and West Nkosi with whom he formed the band The Cannibals.

He was known for coughing while singing. He had a chronic cough, which producers would previously edit out, but was later made into a kind of musical trademark.

== Discography ==
- Mpharanyana and The Cannibals - Ulunywa Izinja (1979)
- Mpharanyana and The Peddlers - Morena Re Thuse Kaofela (1978)
- Mpharanyana and The Peddlers - Hela Ngwanana (1978)
- Mpharanyana and The Cannibals - Zion Soul (1976)
- Mpharanyana and The Cannibals - Nka Nako Ho Motseba (1978)
- Mpharanyana and The Cannibals - Get Funky (1979)
- Mpharanyana and The Cannibals - Highland Drifter ( Song composed by Ray Phiri in 1973)
