= The Rough Guide to the Music of Brazil (1998 album) =

Compilation album by Various artists
- Released: 5 May 1998
- Genre: World, Brazilian
- Length: 68:09
- Label: World Music Network

Full series chronology
The Rough Guide to the Music of South Africa (1998)	The Rough Guide to the Music of Brazil (1998)	The Rough Guide to the Music of Cuba (1998)

The Rough Guide to the Music of Brazil is a world music compilation album originally released in 1998. Part of the World Music Network Rough Guides series, the album spotlights the music of Brazil, with tracks representing genres from across the country. Phil Stanton, co-founder of the World Music Network, produced the album. This was the first of two similarly named albums: the second edition was released in 2007.

== Critical reception ==
Professional ratings
Review scores
Source	Rating
Allmusic	4.5/5 stars

The album received mixed reviews. Writing for AllMusic, Alex Henderson named it one of the most ambitious collections of its type. What Henderson called "variety", Michaelangelo Matos of the Chicago Reader called "inconsistency". According to Matos, the album displayed "a wider stylistic range than any other I've heard", even amongst the Rough Guide releases.

== Track listing ==
No.	Title	Artist	Length
1.	"Provei (Samba/Rio de Janeiro)"	Ivan Lins	4:09
2.	"A Volta da Asa Branca (Forró)"	Dominguinhos & Convidados (w. Maciel Melo)	3:44
3.	"Batom Vermelho (Axé/Bahia)"	Zé Paulo	2:55
4.	"Negada da Lapa (MPB/Rio de Janeiro)"	Adil Tiscatti	3:54
5.	"Isso (MPB/Maranhão)"	Rita Ribeiro	3:26
6.	"Tchori Tchori (Índios Jabuti de Rondônia)"	Marlui Miranda w. Uakti	3:28
7.	"Dança do Maneiro Pau (Regional w. 10-string guitar/Minas Gerais)"	Paulo Freire	3:06
8.	"Tainá (Axé/Bahia)"	Dinho Nascimento	3:45
9.	"Charles Anjo 45 (Axé/Bahia)"	Muzenza	3:45
10.	"Mil Amargos (Regional/Rio Grande do Sul)"	Gilberto Monteiro	2:13
11.	"Anabela (MPB/São Paulo)"	Renato Braz	3:48
12.	"Caymmi Mostra ao Mundo o que a Bahia e a Mangueira Têm (Samba-enredo/Rio de Janeiro)"	Thobias da Vai-Vai	3:55
13.	"Você Vai Ver (Bossa nova/Rio de Janeiro)"	Leny Andrade	4:13
14.	"Rio de Exageros (Jazz Samba/Rio de Janeiro)"	Guinga	4:20
15.	"É Luxo Só (Samba/Rio de Janeiro)"	Rosa Passos	4:26
16.	"Dente de Ouro (MPB/Maranhão)"	Papete	5:52
17.	"Rodeio Dos Ventos (Regional/Santa Catarina)"	Cristaldo Souza	1:12
18.	"Santos Reis (Sertaneja/Minas Gerais)"	Pena Branca & Xavantinho	3:23
19.	"Carinhoso (Choro/Rio de Janeiro)"	Joel Nascimento w. Radamés Gnattali & Camerata Carioca	2:35
