= Kazet (album) =

Studio album by Mahotella Queens
- Released: 2006
- Recorded: 2005
- Genre: Mbaqanga, Mgqashiyo
- Length: 40:00 approx.
- Label: Marabi Productions
- Producer: West Nkosi

Mahotella Queens chronology
Reign & Shine (2005)	Kazet (2006)	Siyadumisa (Songs of Praise) (2007)

Kazet is a 2006 album by the South African mbaqanga group the Mahotella Queens. The album was a compilation of recordings that had recently been recorded in South Africa and in Paris, and included the South African national anthem "Nkosi Sikelel' iAfrika" in addition to new compositions such as "Amazemula" ("Monster"), "Nomshloshazana" (A woman's name) and "Ubusuku Nemini" and classics like "Kazet".

== Track listing ==
1. "Amazemula" ("Monster")
2. "Nomshloshazana" (A woman's name)
3. "Hakenyake"
4. "Kazet"
5. "Muntu Wesilisa" ("We're Talking to You")
6. "Ndodana Yolahleko"
7. "Kade Ulalaphi"
8. "Mbube" ("The Lion")
9. "Ubusuku Nemini" ("Night and Day")
10. "Amabhongo"
11. "Thandanani" ("Love One Another")
12. "Ukhathazile" (A woman's name)
13. "Safa Yindlala" ("They Died Hungry")
14. "Nkosi Sikelel' iAfrika" ("God Bless Africa")
