= The Skylarks (South African vocal group) =

South African all-woman band

The Skylarks were an all-woman South African band of the 1950s, founded by Miriam Makeba. The original lineup comprised Makeba and Johanna Radebe, Mary Rabotapi, and Mummy Girl Nketle. Later, Helen Van Rensburg and Abigail Kubheka replaced Radebe. At one time they were the most popular Black singing band in the country. They also recorded and played as The Sunbeams. Among their influences was the vocal ensemble Quad Sisters, formed by Thandi Klaasen. They played a blend of South African music and jazz. Their music incorporated close harmony singing. Their albums included African Jazz n'Jive, released by Gallo Records, which featured guitarist General Duze. In addition to Makeba, Skylarks members Abigail Kubheka and Letta Mbulu went on to perform in the 1959 jazz musical King Kong, and had successful solo careers thereafter.
