= Nobesuthu Mbadu =

South African musician (1945–2021)

Nobesuthu Gertrude Mbadu
- Born: 26 April 1945; Durban, South Africa
- Died: 31 August 2021 (aged 76) Vosloorus, Ekurhuleni, South Africa
- Genres: Mbaqanga
- Occupation: Singer
- Formerly of: Mahlathini

Nobesuthu Gertrude Mbadu (26 April 1945 – 31 August 2021) was a South African mbaqanga singer, and a singer in the acclaimed group the Mahotella Queens.

== Early life ==
Mbadu was born in Durban, South Africa and was raised by her father Ferguson Mbadu and her grandmother, Selinah Mbadu. She was a singer in both her school and church choirs, and was a member of the acclaimed Amangeyami group. She was spotted by EMI 'black music' talent scout Max Gcaba, who recruited her to EMI where she made several recordings under the name 'Gcaba Sisters'. Rupert Bopape, the black music talent scout for Gallo Record Company (and producer of Gallo's black music unit Mavuthela Music Company) managed to persuade her to move to his stable in 1965. She agreed and was subsequently recruited into his new female group, the Mahotella Queens alongside fellow group members Hilda Tloubatla, Mildred Mangxola, Juliet Mazamisa and Ethel Mngomezulu. The five Queens were then paired with a mbaqanga instrumental team, the Makgona Tsohle Band and the gruff, "groaning" vocals of Simon "Mahlathini" Nkabinde, and the whole band received instant fame.

In 1971, several original Mahotella Queens, including Mbadu, left to pursue other directions in the music business, and so an entirely new line-up of Queens was formed. Mbadu joined rival group Izintombi Zesi Manje Manje, along with Queens lead singer Hilda Tloubatla.

== International fame ==
In 1983, the five original Queens (Tloubatla, Mbadu, Mangxola, Mazamisa and Mngomezulu) were reunited with Mahlathini and the Makgona Tsohle Band. Their comeback release, Amaqhawe Omgqashiyo, was a hit in South Africa. Due to the success of Paul Simon's Graceland 1986 album and tour (in which he collaborated with Ladysmith Black Mambazo, Stimela and others), South African music was in demand.

After the deaths of Mahlathini and several members of the Makgona Tsohle Band, the three Queens (who were all grandmothers and are over sixty years old) remained at the helm today and Mbadu continued to be a part of the Mahotella Queens.

== Death ==
Mbadu died in hospital in Vosloorus, Ekurhuleni due to kidney failure on 31 August 2021, aged 76.
