= Tebogo Moerane =

South African footballer

Personal information
- Full name: Tebogo Pholoso Moerane
- Date of birth: 27 September 1995 (age 31)
- Place of birth: Mookgophong, South Africa
- Height: 1.67 m (5 ft 6 in)
- Position: Defender

Team information
- Current team: Baroka

Senior career*
Years	Team	Apps	(Gls)
2014–2017	Bidvest Wits	9	(0)
2017	AmaZulu	0	(0)
2018	Black Leopards	1	(0)
2016–2019	Real Kings	4	(0)
2022–	Baroka	11	(0)

International career^{‡}
2015–2016	South Africa U23	5	(0)
2015–2016	South Africa	4	(0)
- * Club domestic league appearances and goals as of 01:17, 5 December 2022 (UTC) ‡ National team caps and goals as of 01:17, 5 December 2022 (UTC)

Tebogo Pholoso Moerane (born 7 April 1995) is a South African soccer player who plays as a defender. He represented South Africa in the football competition at the 2016 Summer Olympics.

Born in Mookgophong, he has played in the South African Premier Division for Bidvest Wits, Black Leopards and Royal AM, and in the second tier for Baroka.
