= Tebogo Makobela =

South African professional soccer player (born 1992)

Personal information
- Full name: Tebogo Matome Makobela
- Date of birth: 14 May 1992 (age 34)
- Place of birth: Gemarke Village/Bobirwa Village, Bochum, South Africa
- Height: 1.76 m (5 ft 9 in)
- Position: Midfielder

Team information
- Current team: Black Leopards
- Number: 27

Senior career*
Years	Team	Apps	(Gls)
2013–2018	Jomo Cosmos	108	(5)
2018–2020	Chippa United	13	(0)
2020–	Black Leopards	17	(0)
- * Club domestic league appearances and goals as of 17:52, 13 April 2021 (UTC)

Tebogo Makobela (born 14 May 1992) is a South African professional soccer player who plays as a midfielder for Black Leopards.

== Career ==
Born in Gemarke Village;Bochum, Makobela played for Jomo Cosmos and Chippa United before being released by the latter in summer 2020. In September 2020, Makobela signed for Black Leopards on a three-year deal, but he was suspended by the club for the remainder of the season in April 2021 after taking part in an Easter tournament organised by Thabiso Semenya.
