= Mildred Mangxola =

Nontsomi Mildred Mangxola (born 9 January 1944) is a South African mbaqanga singer, and a singer in the acclaimed group the Mahotella Queens. Mangxola was born in Benoni, Gauteng, South Africa, and loved singing from a young age. She was also a part of local girl group The Daveyton Queens.

== Early life ==
Rupert Bopape, a talent scout with Gallo Record Company, recruited Mangxola into a new female group, the Mahotella Queens alongside fellow group members Hilda Tloubatla, Nobesuthu Mbadu, Juliet Mazamisa and Ethel Mngomezulu after seeing her perform with the Daveytons. The five Mahotella Queens were then paired with a mbaqanga instrumental team, the Makgona Tsohle Band and the gruff, "groaning" vocals of Simon Mahlathini Nkabinde, and the whole band received instant fame.
