= Hilda Tloubatla =

Hilda Semola Tloubatla
- Birth name: Hilda Semola Tloubatla
- Born: 1942; South Africa
- Genres: Mbaqanga, mgqashiyo
- Occupation: musician

Hilda Semola Tloubatla (born 1942) is a South African mbaqanga singer, and the lead singer of the acclaimed group the Mahotella Queens. Tloubatla was born in Payneville, South Africa before moving to kwaThema township in 1951 as a result of (what was) the apartheid government's 'Group Areas Act' in the country.

== Early life ==
Tloubatla first began her music career by recording at the South African Broadcasting Corporation in the late 1950s and early 1960s. However, it wasn't until she joined the session musician team at Gallo Record Company in 1964 that Tloubatla first gained national fame. She was immediately recruited into a new female group, the Mahotella Queens, as a lead singer, along with fellow group members Nobesuthu Mbadu, Mildred Mangxola, Juliet Mazamisa and Ethel Mngomezulu. The five Queens were then paired with a mbaqanga instrumental team, the Makgona Tsohle Band and the gruff, "groaning" vocals of Simon Mahlathini Nkabinde, and not long afterwards, the band – billed as Mahlathini and the Mahotella Queens – were receiving instant fame.

In 1971, several original Mahotella Queens (including Tloubatla) had left to pursue other directions in the music business, such as joining other groups, and so an entirely new line-up of Queens was formed. Tloubatla became a regular member of rival group Izintombi Zesi Manje Manje, but kept returning to the new group of Mahotella Queens on a semi-regular basis.

== International fame ==
In 1983, the five original Queens (Tloubatla, Mbadu, Mangxola, Mazamisa and Mngomezulu) were reunited with Mahlathini and the Makgona Tsohle Band by Makgona Tsohle guitarist and Queens producer Marks Mankwane. Their comeback release, Amaqhawe Omgqashiyo, was a hit in South Africa. Due to the success of Paul Simon's Graceland 1986 album and tour (in which he collaborated with Ladysmith Black Mambazo, Stimela and others), South African music was in demand. Three original Queens, Tloubatla, Mbadu and Mangxola, were reunited once more with their bandmates. Their international popularity was profound.

Even after the deaths of Mahlathini and several members of the Makgona Tsohle Band, the three Queens (who are all grandmothers and are over seventy years old) remained at the helm until the death of Mbadu in 2021.
