= Letta Mbulu =

South African jazz singer (born 1942)

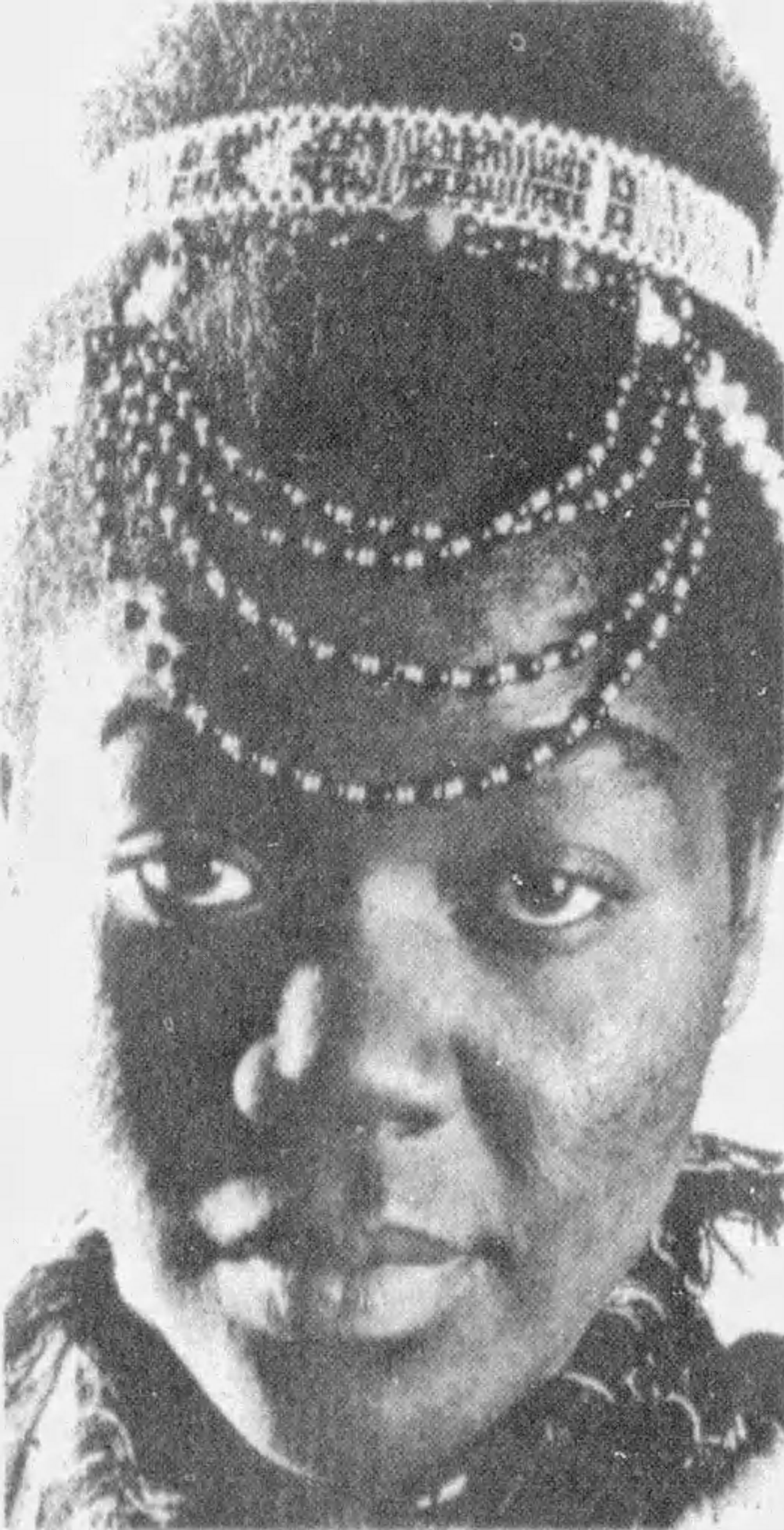
- Mbulu in 1971

Background information
- Born: 23 August 1942 (age 83); Soweto, South Africa
- Genres: Jazz, world
- Occupation: Singer
- Instrument: Vocals
- Years active: 1962–present
- Labels: Capitol, Chisa, Fantasy, A&M
- Spouse: Caiphus Semenya

Letta Mbulu (born 24 September 1942) is a South African jazz singer who has been active since the 1960s.

== Biography ==
Born and raised in Soweto, South Africa, Letta Mbulu has been active as a singer since the 1960s. Early in her career she sang with the all-women South African musical group The Skylarks. While still a teenager, she toured with the all-African musical King Kong but left for the United States in 1964 due to apartheid.

In New York City, she connected with other South African exiles, including Miriam Makeba, Hugh Masekela and Jonas Gwangwa, and went on to work with Cannonball Adderley, David Axelrod and Harry Belafonte.

On screen, her singing can also be heard in the 1973 film A Warm December, the 1977 television series Roots, and 1985's The Color Purple, and she was a guest on a Season 6 episode of Soul Train. Mbulu also provided the Swahili chant in Michael Jackson's single "Liberian Girl". Producer Quincy Jones said of her: "Mbulu is the roots lady, projecting a sophistication and warmth which stirs hope for attaining pure love, beauty, and unity in the world."

She is the founding member of the South African Artists United (SAAU), an organisation that was established in 1986.

== Personal life ==
Mbulu is married to musician Caiphus Semenya.

As the apartheid regime categorised, discriminated against and abused South Africa's non-white population in the 1960s, Mbulu went to the United States, where, in exile, she continued to pursue music. She toured with jazz alto saxophonist Cannonball Adderley, and also went on to join forces with American singer Harry Belafonte. Together they went on several world tours. Her main musical influences became folk, American Jazz and Brazilian music.

== Awards ==
- 2001: South African Music Award for lifetime achievement.
- 2009: Order of Ikhamanga in Silver.
- 2018: Mzantsi Jazz Award for her lifetime achievement.

== Discography ==
- Letta Mbulu Sings (Capitol, 1967)
- Free Soul (Capitol, 1968)
- Letta (Chisa, 1970)
- Naturally (Fantasy, 1972)
- There's Music in the Air (A&M, 1976)
- Letta (A&M, 1977)
- Letta Mbulu – Gold (A&M, 1978)
- Sound of a Rainbow (CBS, 1980)
- Letta Mbulu – Sweet juju (Morning, 1985)
- The Best of Letta & Caiphus (Columbia, 1996)
- Greatest Hits (Columbia, 1999)
- Letta Mbulu Sings/Free Soul (Stateside, 2005)
- Culani Nami (Sony, 2007)

With Quincy Jones

- Roots (A&M, 1977)
