= Dark City Sisters =

South African female vocal group

- Genre: mbaqanga
- Members: Francisca Mngomezulu; Irene Mawela
- Past members: Joyce Mogatusi

The Dark City Sisters were a South African female vocal group formed in 1958 by music producer Rupert Bopape. They recorded several hit records during the 1960s, helping usher in the mbaqanga style of South African music later brought to global prominence by the Mahotella Queens.

The Sisters were formed by Bopape, also a talent scout, at EMI South Africa. The group was named after Alexandra Township, known at the time as "Dark City" due to its lack of street lighting. The early line-up included Joyce Mogatusi, Francisca Mngomezulu, Irene Mawela, Hilda Mogapi, Kate Olene, and Esther Khoza. The group's close harmonies were often combined with a single male vocalist, at a time when most bands consisted of a female lead backed up by a group of men. In their early days the Sisters were fronted by vocalist Jack Lerole and later by Simon "Mahlathini" Nkabinde. Their backing band was Alexandra Black Mambazo.

The new style of the Dark City Sisters proved very popular and they enjoyed several hits during the 1960s, also touring South Africa and neighbouring countries. Membership changed frequently, with group vocalists such as Francisca Mngomezulu and Caroline Kapentar later singing for the Mahotella Queens. Lead singer Joyce Mogatusi remained the only consistent link throughout the Dark City Sisters line-up. The second-longest serving member was Grace Msika, who joined the group in 1960.

The group dissolved in 1971 for a short time, before reforming in the middle 1970s, primarily as a live performing group although contracted at various points to Gallo-Mavuthela, EMI and CCP. The 1980s was a decade in which very few recordings of new material were made, with most of their time taken up by concert performances. By the 1990s and early 2000s, following the explosion of international interest in South African music, the Sisters were fully immersed in concert appearances in the country and continued to make one-off recordings.

In July 2012, group leader Joyce Mogatusi died from heart failure at the age of 75. She had been a part of the Dark City Sisters for 53 years.
