= Tebogo Ditshego =

South African CEO

Tebogo Ditshego is the chief executive officer (CEO) of South African public relations agency Ditshego Media and was appointed as the President of the Public Relations Institute of Southern Africa (PRISA) in 2021. Forbes Magazine included him in their list of the top 30 African entrepreneurs under 30 in 2014. In 2012, he founded the online book club ReadaBookSA.

In 2022, the Minister in the Presidency, Mondli Gungubele, appointed him to serve in the Marketing, Advertising and Communication South Africa (MAC SA) Charter Council.

In 2016, Tebogo Ditshego published his first African fiction book "Kasi Nerd" which went on to be a bestseller. In June, 2014 Tebogo Ditshego participated in the Mandela Fellowship for Young African Leaders in the US, a programme launched by US President Barack Obama. The Mail & Guardian newspaper listed Tebogo Ditshego as one of the top 200 youth in South Africa for the work he has done in spreading a culture of reading books.

He worked on the communications campaign for the "Mandela" banknotes for the South African Reserve Bank. In 2006 and 2007 he was selected twice consecutively to serve in the Student Representative Council at the University of Johannesburg. Tebogo Ditshego represented the University of Johannesburg twice consecutively to present his research papers at the Southern African Association of Communications Conference.

In 2021, Tebogo Ditshego was elected President of the Public Relations Institute of Southern Africa (PRISA), and the Convener of the 2022 PRISM Awards which achieved a record ticket sales

The Sowetan listed Tebogo Ditshego as one of the top 12 sexiest men in South Africa for 2014 because of his role in making it cool to be intelligent and coining the term intellectual swag. He is currently a judge in season 4 of SABC 1 programme, One Day Leader.

He holds a Master of Business Administration (MBA) from GIBS Business School, University of Pretoria, a Postgraduate Diploma in General Management from GIBS Business School, University of Pretoria and an Honours degree in Communications from the University of Johannesburg.
