= Mahotella Queens =

South African female band

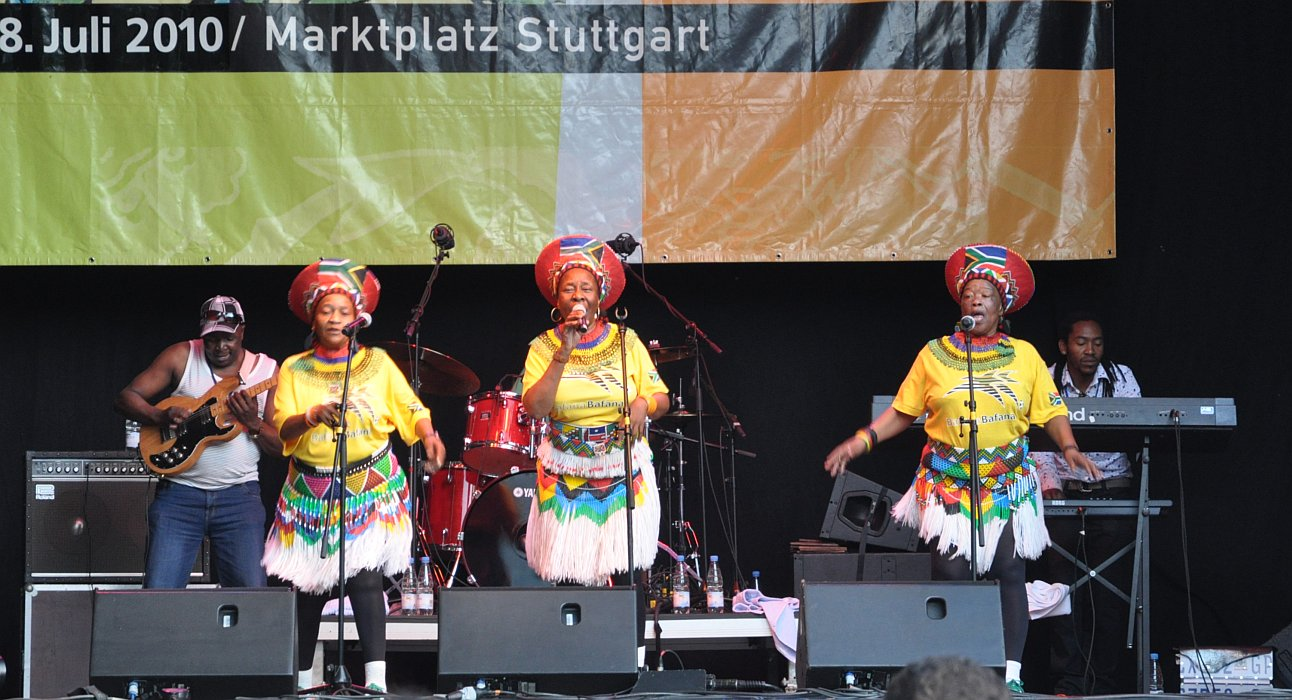
- Mahotella Queens, 2010; Left to right: Nobesuthu Mbadu, Hilda Tloubatla, Mildred Mangxola

Background information
- Origin: Johannesburg, South Africa
- Genres: World, African, Mbaqanga, Mgqashiyo
- Years active: 1964–present
- Labels: Umsakazo Records; Gallo Record Company; Shanachie; Wrasse; Celluloid Records; Content Connect Africa
- Members: Hilda Tloubatla; Amanda Nkosi; Nqobile Njapha
- Past members: Mildred Mangxola; Nobesuthu Mbadu

The Mahotella Queens is a South African female group established in 1964. The group is one of the most prominent specialising in mbaqanga, a style born in the recording studios of 1960s South Africa and the first genre in the country to utilise fully electric rhythm accompaniment. The Queens developed an upbeat and distinct identity which combined multi-part girl group harmonies with energetic stage choreography, the baritone male vocals of Simon 'Mahlathini' Nkabinde and intense backup from the Makgona Tsohle Band, offering listeners happy respite during the oppressive era of apartheid. The original line-up of the Queens usually revolved around five singers fronted by popular soprano Hilda Tloubatla, but its membership evolved significantly into the 1970s and 1980s. A successful tour of France in 1987 comprising three of the original Queens – Tloubatla, Nobesuthu Mbadu and Mildred Mangxola – paved the way for an international touring career that has lasted across four decades, in spite of the deaths of Mahlathini and several Makgona Tsohle Band members. The current line-up of the Mahotella Queens consists of Tloubatla, Amanda Nkosi and Nqobile Njapha.

== History ==
=== 1960s ===
Rupert Bopape, a renowned talent scout and businessman, joined Gallo Africa in 1964 with the instruction to form a new ‘black music’ subsidiary, later named Mavuthela Music. His first group was a revolving line-up of female session singers that would record under various pseudonyms to compete with established girl groups such as the Sweet Sixteens and the Dark City Sisters and featuring Bopape’s ‘discovery’ Simon ‘Mahlathini’ Nkabinde as a male soloist and backed by a house band later christened Makgona Tsohle. Several of the new group’s 78rpms were issued as the Mahotella Queens, which became the most recognisable to listeners. Their sound developed heavily on mbaqanga, a type of upbeat jive music that fused traditional African rhythms with modern electric instrumentation, as well as contrasting up-tempo female harmony with powerful male bass vocal. Mahlathini became well known in his own right as a groaner, the name given to male lead singers with particularly deep and "groaning" vocals. The line-up of the Queens was drawn from a pool of vocalists that included Hilda Tloubatla, Nunu Maseko, Ethel Mngomezulu, Windy Sibeko, Juliet Mazamisa, Mildred Mangxola, Nobesuthu Mbadu and Mary Rabotapi (formerly of vocal group The Skylarks).

After a series of early hit singles, there was a significant demand for live appearances. Mahlathini and the Mahotella Queens devised a boisterous stage act combining traditional Zulu and Xhosa dance with popular American jive choreography. The demand saw the group ensconced in nationwide tours that lasted several weeks or months, with additional visits to Lesotho, Botswana, Swaziland, the then-Rhodesia, Zambia, Malawi and Mozambique. They also continued to record prolifically during this time. Among their most successful singles were "Izinyoni", "Thoko", "Ashikinisi" (or "Jive Motella"), "Umoya", "Pitsa Tse Kgolo" (better known as "Melodi Ya Lla"), "Sithunyiwe", "Mahlare", "Lilizela" and "Jive Makhona". The group’s take on mbaqanga became increasingly referred to as "mgqashiyo" during the 1960s and was emulated by a host of rival producers and artists. By the early 1970s, the group was one of black South Africa’s most popular and profitable musical attractions.

=== 1970s ===
In 1972, Mahlathini and some of the Mahotella Queens resigned from Gallo over a dispute with Rupert Bopape about unfair treatment. They spent the rest of the decade recording for competing labels and performing on stage as ‘Mahlathini and the Queens’. In order to keep the Mahotella Queens brand alive, Bopape recruited new singers to replace them and by the late 1970s the group had settled on a nucleus that included groaner Robert 'Mbazo' Mkhize, soprano Emily Zwane, Beatrice Ngcobo, Thandi Radebe, Thandi Nkosi and Caroline Kapentar. Many of these members had been promoted from junior Mavuthela groups such as the Mthunzini Girls and Izintombi Zomoya. Also during this period, Bopape began to farm out production duties to Makgona Tsohle Band members including West Nkosi, who produced the first commercial recordings by Zulu choir Ladysmith Black Mambazo and Rhodesia-based The Green Arrows.

The Mahotella Queens maintained their popularity through most of the 1970s despite the change in faces, boosted by the support of Abafana baseQhudeni, a newly formed all-male mbaqanga vocal group. One of their most enduring hits was the 1973 single "Umculo Kawupheli" ("The music never ends"), the lyrics of which celebrate music as a source of joy and healing and which sold 25,000 copies, earning a gold disc. However, in the aftermath of the 1976 Soweto Uprising, the popularity of mbaqanga and other local music genres began to wane in favour of American-influenced soul and disco.

=== 1980s ===
Rupert Bopape began to pull out of day-to-day operations at Mavuthela after 1977, forcing the Makgona Tsohle Band to retire from live performing and take over production duties. West Nkosi continued to oversee Ladysmith Black Mambazo’s now-hugely lucrative recording career as well as producing a slew of new soul and disco-inspired acts like Mpharanyana and The Cannibals and Patience Africa. Guitarist Marks Mankwane took charge of the Mahotella Queens as its producer, arranger and manager, in addition to producing artists Abafana baseQhudeni, Walter Dlamini, Olga Mvicane and Joyce Thabe. The Beggers provided instrumental backup for the Queens and other Mankwane-produced artists. Mankwane produced several popular Queens albums in the early 1980s including Tsamaya Moratuoa, Thatha Izimpahla Zakho, Ezesimanje, Tsa Lebowa and Khwatha O Mone. To compete with the popular Abafana baseQhudeni, West Nkosi formed a rival male group, Amaswazi Emvelo, which was to become one of South Africa’s most successful mbaqanga groups of the 1980s.

The introduction of African-language television in 1982 helped to create a brief nostalgia boom. The Makgona Tsohle Band reunited to star in a musical sitcom titled Mathaka (The guys) in 1983. Off the back of the show’s success, Mankwane reunited five of the original Mahotella Queens with groaner Mahlathini to create the supergroup Mahlathini Nezintombi Zomgqashiyo. The project produced at least three albums and a couple of nationwide tours until disbanding in 1984 after the abrupt cancellation of Mathaka. Mankwane continued to release material under the Mahotella Queens name thereafter, while Mahlathini joined forces with Amaswazi Emvelo to create several highly successful collaborative albums.

During the 1980s, several global music projects featuring the work of mbaqanga musicians helped the genre breakthrough into the international market. These included Malcolm McLaren's Duck Rock (1983), Lizzy Mercier Descloux’s Zulu Rock (1984), the compilation The Indestructible Beat of Soweto (1985), Paul Simon's Graceland (1986) and Harry Belafonte’s Paradise in Gazankulu (1988). Hoping to build on the recent success experienced by Ladysmith Black Mambazo through their work in the Graceland project, West Nkosi was able to secure an appearance at a French music festival for Mahlathini, Amaswazi Emvelo and the Makgona Tsohle Band in March 1987. The appearance was a major success, but promoters quickly convinced Nkosi to bring along the original Mahotella Queens, with whom Mahlathini and the Makgona Tsohle Band had appeared on several tracks on The Indestructible Beat of Soweto. Under Nkosi’s production, Mahlathini, three of the original Queens – Hilda Tloubatla, Nobesuthu Mbadu and Mildred Mangxola – and the Makgona Tsohle Band recorded a comeback album, Thokozile, followed by a full-length tour of Europe that was so well received that it was extended until the end of the year.

=== 1990s ===
From the late 1980s until the late 1990s, Mahlathini and the Mahotella Queens were busy with an endless stream of tours of the United States, Canada, the UK, France, Germany, the Netherlands, Australia and Japan. In 1988, they performed at Nelson Mandela's 70th Birthday Tribute Concert, held at Wembley Stadium in London before an estimated global television audience of 600 million people; they headlined the Montreux Jazz Festival in 1991 and 1993; in 1991 they performed to a crowd of 500,000 at Central Park in New York; in 1993 they headlined WOMADelaide; and in 1994 they performed at the inauguration of Nelson Mandela as South Africa’s first black president. They also resumed their recording career with albums including Paris – Soweto (1987), Rhythm and Art (1989), Mbaqanga (1991), Women of the World (1993) and Stoki Stoki (1994). In 1989, the group was featured on Yebo, a single by The Art of Noise. In 1991, West Nkosi left Mahlathini and the Mahotella Queens to focus on producing new talent in South Africa and Marks Mankwane once again resumed his role as producer and manager of the group.

During the 1990s, the healths of both Mahlathini and Marks Mankwane began to decline after diagnoses of diabetes. In 1996, bassist Joseph Makwela retired from the group. In August 1998, the group’s former producer West Nkosi was paralysed in a car accident and died from his injuries two months later, and on the day of his funeral, the death was announced of Marks Mankwane. The Queens and Mahlathini – by now also in fragile health – paid tribute to the two musicians with the recording of a new album, Umuntu, featuring George Mangxola on lead guitar. Mahlathini died in July 1999, just after the completion of Umuntu.

=== 2000s ===
Despite the retirements and deaths of several significant band members, the Mahotella Queens decided to continue with their music careers and formed a new backing band of young mbaqanga musicians. In 2000, they released a 14-track comeback album, Sebai Bai, recorded in Johannesburg and Paris and dedicated to Mahlathini, Mankwane and Nkosi. In the same year, the Queens received the second annual WOMEX Award for outstanding contribution to world music. The Queens embarked on successful tours of the United States and Europe during the next few years, which included appearances at the New Orleans Jazz & Heritage Festival and New York’s SOB's.

In 2004, the Queens released the experimental Bazobuya album, which fused their familiar mgqashiyo sound with house. The following year, the group resigned from Gallo after forty years and released Reign & Shine, another album departing from their usual sound, this time featuring mostly a cappella numbers with occasional guitar and percussion. To support the release, the Queens toured the United Kingdom as the support act for Ladysmith Black Mambazo between May and June 2006. The Queens headlined WOMAD 2006 in July.

In 2007, the Queens released Siyadumisa (Songs of Praise), a mbaqanga-gospel album. The group completed a tour of Europe on 25 August 2007 in which they performed their new material at various WOMAD festivals. The Queens also performed at venues in South Africa during late 2007 and 2008.

=== 2010s ===
The Mahotella Queens appeared as part of Pee Wee Ellis's show Still Black, Still Proud: An African Tribute to James Brown during 2010. South African jazz artist Hugh Masekela joined forces with the Mahotella Queens for a special UK tour for November 2010. Their performance in London's Southbank Centre was completely sold out.

In 2013, the Queens recorded a Kwaito version of their best known hits, “Kazet”, accompanied by modern stars Zamo and Brickz. The remix formed part of a national voting campaign for a theme song for the MTN 8 football tournament. Later in the year, longstanding member Mildred Mangxola announced her retirement from the Queens. She was replaced by Amanda Nkosi, a 28-year-old stage performer and vocalist. In 2016, the Queens returned to mainstream success after being featured on hiphop star Cassper Nyovest's hit "Malome", which was based on the group’s 2006 song "Sela Ndini".

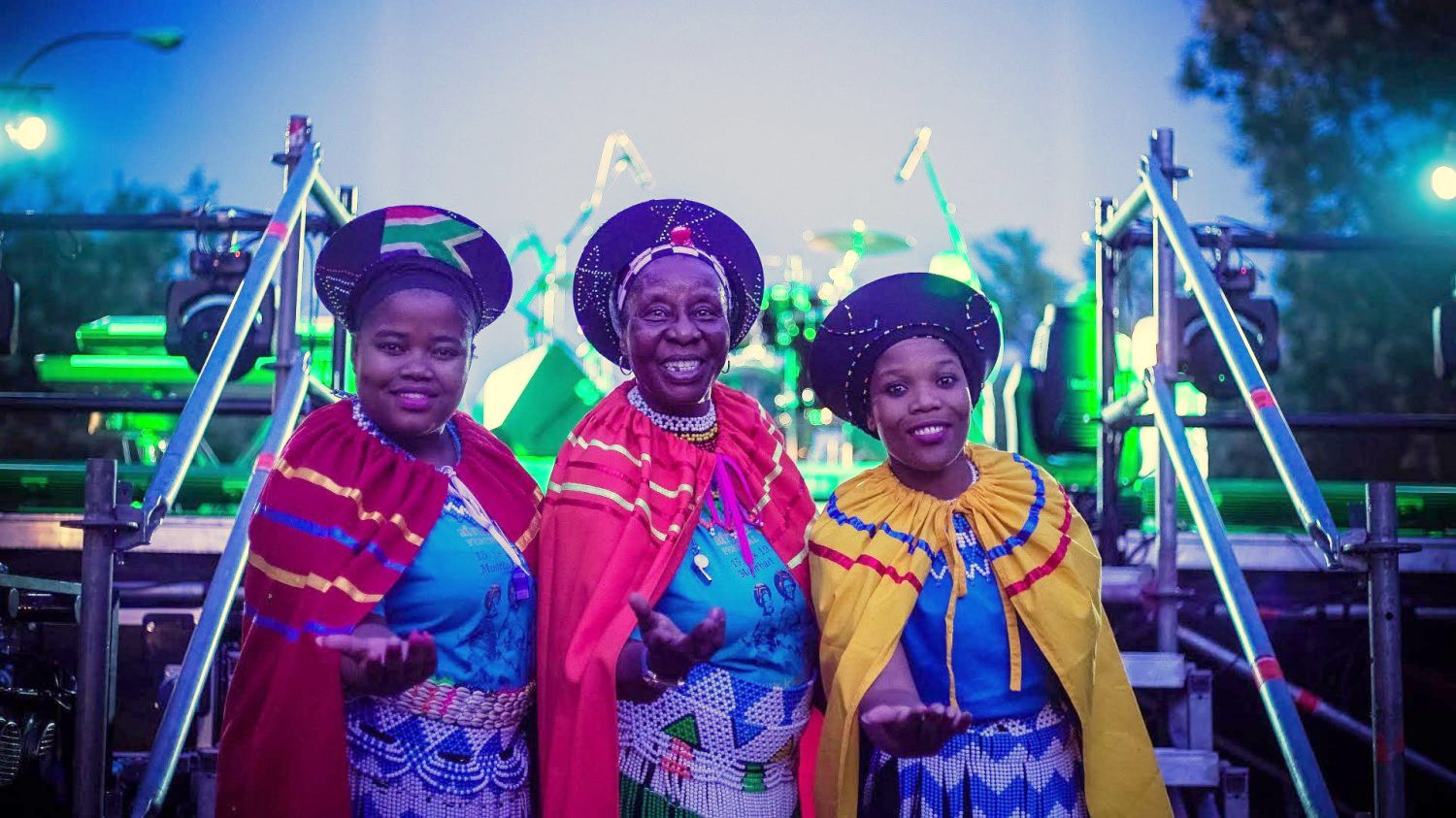
Mahotella Queens in 2017 in Madrid (Spain).

In 2017, Nobesuthu Mbadu retired from the Queens, leaving only Hilda Tloubatla as the last remaining active member from the group’s original line-up. Mbadu, who died from kidney failure in 2021, was replaced by another young singer and theatre actress, 27-year-old Nonku Maseko.

=== 2020s ===
In 2025, the Queens announced their signing with UK-based label Umsakazo Records, which in July released the group’s first album of new material since 2007, Buya Buya: Come Back. The following month, the Queens made their first overseas performances since 2019 with a tour of Japan, headlining the 18th annual World Music and Dance Festival in Hakodate, Hokkaido, as well as performing several concerts in Tokyo and Kobe.

In August 2026, in partnership with the South African government's Department of Sport, Arts and Culture, the Mahotella Queens launched a new concert series named Buyel' Ekhaya ("Coming Home"), marking their first headline shows in South Africa for several years. The inaugural show was held on Saturday 8 August at Untitled Basement, a prominent live music lounge in Braamfontein, Johannesburg and featured the stage debut of the group's newest member, gospel backing vocalist Nqobile Njapha.

== Discography ==
The Mahotella Queens recorded prolifically for Gallo and turned out hundreds of 78 and 45 rpm singles during the 1960s and 1970s. However, very little of this archive material is readily available, with only select compilations and reissues made over the years. The group resigned from Gallo in 2005 to join Content Connect Africa. In 2025, the Queens moved over to Umsakazo Records and began to actively revive their recording career, which had dwindled in the previous two decades.

== See also ==
- Mahlathini
- Makgona Tsohle Band
- Mahlathini and the Mahotella Queens
