= Reign & Shine =

Studio album by Mahotella Queens
- Released: October 3, 2006
- Genres: Mbaqanga, mgqashiyo
- Length: 50:43
- Label: African Cream Music
- Producer: Ian Osrin

Mahotella Queens chronology
Bazobuya (2004)	Reign & Shine (2006)	Kazet (2006)

Reign & Shine is a 2006 album by the South African mbaqanga group the Mahotella Queens. The album was a break from their usual mgqashiyo music, focusing on three-part vocal harmonies and percussion (by Veli Shabangu), with electric guitar and bass only appearing on some tracks. The album featured new compositions such as "Amazemula" ("Monster") and "Ndodana Yolahleko" as well as returning songs like "Town Hall" and "Amabhongo" in addition to the South African former co-national anthem, "Nkosi Sikelel' iAfrika".

== Track listing ==
1. "Amazemula" ("Monster")
2. "Sela Ndini" ("Thieves Are About")
3. "Muntu Wesilisa" ("We're Talking to You")
4. "Ndodana Yolahleko"
5. "Town Hall"
6. "Mbube" ("The Lion")
7. "Amabhongo"
8. "Saphel' Isizwe" ("Disease Is All Over The Nation")
9. "Thandanani" ("Love One Another")
10. "Siyancela" ("We're Begging You")
11. "Safa Yindlala" ("They Died Hungry")
12. "Nkosi Sikelel' iAfrika" ("God Bless Africa")
13. "Nomshloshazana"
14. "Ukhathazile"
15. "Kazet"

== Personnel ==
- Hilda Tloubatla (vocals)
- Nobesuthu Mbadu (vocals)
- Mildred Mangxola (vocals)
- Veli Shabangu (percussion)
- David Mirandon (percussion)
- Louis Mhlango (guitar)
- Texan Thusi (lead guitar)
- Madoda Ntshingilia (bass guitar)
- Régis Gizavo (accordion)
- Ian Osrin (engineer, producer)
- Christian Mousset (producer)
- Anton Stella (manager)
- Philippe Teissier Du Cros (recording and mixing)
- Fabien Girard (recording and mixing assistant)
- Enoch Sontonga (composition)
- H Tloubatla (composition)
- M Mangxola (composition)
- N Mbadu (composition)
- O Ngobeni (composition)
- Solomon Linda (composition)
- W Nkosi (composition)
- African Cream Music (executive producer)
