= Marabi =

South African musical style and genre

- Stylistic origins: South African folk music; jazz; ragtime; blues
- Cultural origins: 1890s–1920s
- Derivative forms: Mbaqanga

Marabi is a style of music and dance form that evolved and emerged in South Africa between the 1890s and 1920s.

The early part of the century saw the increasing urbanisation of black South Africans in mining centres such as the gold mining area around Johannesburg - the Witwatersrand. This led to the development of township slums or ghettos, and out of this hardship came forth new forms of music, marabi and kwela amongst others.

Marabi was the name given to a keyboard style (often using cheap pedal organs) that had a musical link to American jazz, ragtime and blues, with roots deep in the African tradition. Early marabi musicians were part of an underground musical culture and were typically not recorded. Indeed, as with early jazz in the US, the music incurred the displeasure of the establishment. Nonetheless, as with early jazz, the lilting melodies and catchy rhythms of marabi found their way into the sounds of popular dance bands with a distinctively South African style.

The sound of marabi was intended to draw people into local bars or "shebeens" (where illicit drinks like skokiaan were sold), and to get them dancing. "Shebeens" resemble the American speakeasies of the prohibition era where American Jazz was very popular.

Marabi is characterised by a few simple chords repeated in varying vamping patterns that could go on for a long time; repetitive harmonic patterns being typical of traditional African musics. This was the case so people could dance for extended periods of time without having to know the songs well. People were able to pick up the feel and rhythm of the song after a few times through the progression.

The most famous of marabi's venues were the shebeens, and the weekend-long slumyard parties. For almost everyone outside ghetto life, however, marabi and its subculture were shunned. Associated with illegality, police raids, sex and a desperately impoverished working class, marabi was thought of as a corrupting menace and for this reason, it is no surprise that no early marabi musicians were recorded.

A reflection of this music can be heard in the music of such Cape Jazz performers as Basil Coetzee or Abdullah Ibrahim. The beginnings of broadcast radio intended for black listeners and the growth of an indigenous recording industry helped propel such sounds to immense popularity from the 1930s onward.

Such bands produced the first generation of professional black musicians in South Africa. Over the years, marabi developed into early mbaqanga, arguably the most distinctive form of South African music. This has continued to influence South African music since then, from the jazz performers of the post-war years to the more populist township forms of the 1980s and onwards. With the infusion of more traditional influences, marabi has lost much of its link to the style's jazz roots and is now part of the African music culture as opposed to South African Jazz.

The synthesis of American jazz with marabi produced the tsaba-tsaba style in the 1940s, best known for the international hit "Skokiaan".

One of the most notable musical pieces that contain a hint of Marabi is Paul Simon's 1986 epic, Graceland. The Garland Encyclopedia of Music says, "Fundamental to much of the musical mix (of Graceland) was the influence of the African-American jazz, introduced into South Africa by transnational record-distribution networks in the 1920s. Most South African jazz musicians could not read scores, so they developed their own jazz flavor, mixing American swing with African melodies. The dynamic blend of african-american structure and African style became the basis for early South African township jazz known as marabi."
