= West Nkosi =

- Born: 1940; Nelspruit, South Africa
- Died: 8 October 1998 (aged 57–58)
- Genres: Lively, Upbeat, Dance
- Occupations: Musician, Composer, Producer, Recording artist
- Instruments: Alto saxophone, Penny whistle (Tin whistle)

West Nkosi (1940 – 8 October 1998) was a South African music producer, saxophonist and songwriter.

Nkosi was born in Nelspruit, South Africa. He was an original member of the Makgona Tsohle Band which backed Mahlathini and the Mahotella Queens. He was also a producer in the Mavuthela Music subsidiary of Gallo Record Company where he produced thousands of recordings by several famous South African artists, including the first 22 records for Ladysmith Black Mambazo (he managed the group until their international discovery in 1987). Nkosi also produced all the international releases for Mahlathini and the Mahotella Queens, and the Makgona Tsohle Band between 1986 and 1991, when he left both the Mahlathini and the Queens and Makgona Tsohle to concentrate solely on producing. Nkosi did, however, return to the recording studio with the critically acclaimed Rhythm of Healing: Supreme Sax and Penny Whistle Township Jive, in 1993.

Nkosi was paralyzed in an automobile accident in August 1998, and died from his injuries two months later, at 58 years old.

== Selected discography ==
Albums

- Sixteen Original Sax Jive Hits – Vol 1 (1991)
- Rhythm of Healing: Supreme Sax and Penny Whistle Township Jive (1993)
- Sixteen Original Jive Hits – Vol 2 (2000)

Contributing artist

- The Rough Guide to the Music of South Africa (1998, World Music Network)
