= Gallo Record Company =

South African record label

- Parent company: Arena Holdings
- Founded: 1926; 100 years ago
- Founder: Eric Gallo (Gallo Records), Arnold Golembo (Gramophone Record Company)
- Distributors: Gallo Music South Africa (South Africa); Gallo Music International / Warner Music (international)
- Genre: All
- Country of origin: South Africa
- Official website: gallo.africa

Gallo Record Company is the largest (and oldest independent) record label in South Africa. It is based in Johannesburg, and is owned by Arena Holdings. The current Gallo Record Company is a hybrid of two South African record labels, rivals between the 1940s and 1980s: the original Gallo Africa (1926–85) and G.R.C. (Gramophone Record Company, 1939–85). In 1985, Gallo Africa acquired G.R.C.; as a result, Gallo Africa became known as Gallo-GRC. Five years after the acquisition, the company was renamed Gallo Record Company.

== History ==
Eric Gallo set up a one-man business, the Brunswick Gramophone House, in 1926. The record shop was originally devised to distribute records from the US-based Brunswick Records into South Africa. However, noticing the lack of recording facilities (as well as the amount of local talent) in the country, Gallo decided to form a recording studio in 1932 and, borrowing equipment (and a sound engineer) from the then just-defunct Metropole company in the United Kingdom, Gallo opened the "Gallo Recording Studios" under the auspices of Gallo Africa (using a red rooster as the company's symbol, which remains today). Gallo was South Africa's first recording company and became home to a number of classic recordings, including "Mbube" (recorded in 1939 by Solomon Linda and his "Original Evening Birds"). A wealth of local artists had recordings released on Gallo's many labels, including "Singer", "Gallotone", "Gallo New Sound", "USA", and many more. African music (or "black music", as it was then known) was produced by Griffith Motsieloa, a local talent scout whom Gallo had recruited to his fold.

Throughout the 1950s, Gallo remained successful, though it was competing against the South African branch of EMI. EMI's African music division, led by black talent scout Rupert Bopape, prospered well into the early 1960s with marabi and African jazz recordings by the Dark City Sisters and others. Gallo lost sales in its own black music unit, led by saxophonist-producer Reggie Msomi and scout Walter Nhlapo, and so, in 1964, the company poached Bopape to join Gallo. Bopape formed the Mavuthela Music Company division of Gallo Africa, recording famous and local mbaqanga and jive artists, and was promoted as "South Africa's Motown" (the acclaimed Mavuthela quintet, the Mahotella Queens, was perhaps the South African equivalent to Motown's trio of stars, The Supremes). Dozens of recordings were issued on labels such as "Motella", "Gumba Gumba", "CTC Star Records", "FGB", "Gallotone", "USA", and many more. Also in the 1950s they started producing the Gallotone guitar.

Arnold Golembo founded the Gramophone Record Company in Johannesburg in 1939. GRC obtained the South African franchise for the Capitol Records label in 1946 (later moved to EMI Brigadiers), and the franchise for CBS Records in 1956.

In 1985, G.R.C. was incorporated into Gallo Africa. The company was named Gallo-GRC, and incorporated Gallo's production stable, Mavuthela, and GRC's production stable, Isibaya Esikhulu. These stables had been fierce rivals from around the mid-1960s up to Gallo's take-over of G.R.C. The company was renamed Gallo Record Company in 1990.

Producers at Gallo included West Nkosi, who was an influential and intimidating figure at the company from 1964 until his death in 1997. Nkosi was a member of the Makgona Tsohle Band, which backed up all of Mavuthela's (1964–1985) mbaqanga artists such as the Mahotella Queens, Abafana Baseqhudeni, Mahlathini, and many others. Nkosi introduced to Gallo some of its most well-known artists – these included Ladysmith Black Mambazo (1972), The Green Arrows (1974), Mpharanyana and the Cannibals (1976), and Amaswazi Emvelo (1978).

Other figures at Gallo over the years have included talent scouts Rupert Bopape and Louis Abel Petersen as well as musician-composer-arrangers such as Shadrack Piliso, Marks Mankwane, Hilda Tloubatla, Lucky Monama, Joseph Shabalala, Simon Mahlathini Nkabinde and Thandi Nkomo, in addition to figures such as Eric Gallo, Peter Gallo, and others.

In 2006, Johnnic Communications (Gallo's parent company, which changed its name to Avusa in November 2007) entered a joint venture with the South African division of Warner Music International, forming Warner Music Gallo Africa, making Gallo Record Company's entire music archive digitally available for the first time. These include rare pressings as well as classic hits by artists such as Ladysmith Black Mambazo, Mahlathini and the Mahotella Queens, Miriam Makeba, Hugh Masekela, Letta Mbulu, Spokes Mashiyane, Lucky Dube, Yvonne Chaka Chaka and others.

The Warner/Gallo joint venture ended in December 2013.

== See also ==
- Warner Music South Africa
