= Mbaqanga =

South African musical genre

- Stylistic origins: Marabi, kwela
- Cultural origins: Early 1960s, South Africa
- Derivative forms: Township Jive

Mbaqanga (Zulu pronunciation: [mɓaˈǃáːŋga]) is a style of South African music that emerged in the early 1960s in the urban townships, particularly around Johannesburg. It draws from a variety of ethnic traditions, including Zulu, Xhosa, Sotho, Pedi, and Tsonga musical elements. Mbaqanga blends traditional South African vocal harmonies, rhythmic patterns, and dance styles with influences from marabi, kwela, and Western popular music such as jazz. It continues to influence musicians both in South Africa and globally.

== History ==
In Zulu, the term mbaqanga means an everyday cornmeal porridge. Mbaqanga aficionados were mostly plebeian, metropolitan African jazz enthusiasts. Many of them were not permitted to establish themselves in the city, but they were unable to sustain themselves in the rural country. Mbaqanga gave them a staple form of musical and spiritual sustenance; it was their "musical daily bread."

Mbaqanga musicians received little money. For example, Simon "Mahlathini" Nkabinde, one of the most well-known mbaqanga singers (and arguably the most famous mbaqanga "groaner", nicknamed the "lion of Soweto"), died a poor man. This was partly due to the exploitation of black South African musicians at home and abroad as Mahlathini pointed out. Mbaqanga groups of the 1960s also found it difficult to get air time on local radio stations, and had to perform outside record stores to attract audiences.

Mbaqanga developed in the South African shebeens during the 1960s. Its use of western instruments allowed mbaqanga to develop into a South African version of jazz. Musically, the sound indicated a mix between western instrumentation and South African vocal style. Many mbaqanga scholars consider it to be the result of a coalition between marabi and kwela. A South African tourist website sponsored by the government describes mbaqanga as "the cyclic structure of marabi . . . with a heavy dollop of American big band swing thrown on top." Mbaqanga also provided a very early forum for black and white interaction in a segregated country. As a result, the "white Nationalist government brought this vital era to an end" by razing the townships that supported mbaqanga such as Sophiatown.

The genre gained popularity as a result of radio play by stations under the South African Broadcasting Corporation. Early artists included Miriam Makeba, Dolly Rathebe and Letta Mbulu. Mbaqanga maintained its popularity until the 1980s when it was replaced by South African pop music known as bubblegum. Bubblegum is a genre highly influenced by mbaqanga. One of the few remaining mbaqanga bands is The Cool Crooners. This band consists of a coalition between two rival bands that eventually merged: The Cool Four and The Golden Delicious Rhythm Crooners.

=== Formation ===
By the middle of the 1950s, the evolving indigenous South African music exploded in popularity given its increased reach to a massively growing urban population. A typical area was the township of Sophiatown, near Johannesburg, which had since the 1930s offered a black urban lifestyle. Sophiatown and Alexandra were rare "freehold" areas where blacks could own property. Its proximity to Johannesburg's downtown area made Sophiatown attractive to performers eager to explore new avenues of music. The area became an important seed-bed for the rapidly developing black musical culture. But when Sophiatown's residents were forcibly removed to newly formed townships such as Soweto, outside Johannesburg, this era came to an end.

One of the earliest innovators of mbaqanga was the Makgona Tsohle Band, a group comprising five domestic workers from Pretoria – Marks Mankwane (lead guitar), Joseph Makwela (bass guitar), Vivian Ngubane (rhythm guitar), Lucky Monama (drums) and West Nkosi (saxophone). Mbaqanga, a Zulu word for steamed cornbread, fused marabi and kwela influences. The cyclic structure of marabi melded with traditional dance styles such as the Zulu indlamu, combined with big band swing. The indlamu input developed into the "African stomp" style, giving a notably African rhythmic impulse to the music and making it quite irresistible to its new audiences.

Rupert Bopape, enticed by the successful Gallo Record Company to be their African production manager, brought together the musicians of the Makgona Tsohle Band with Mahlathini and a new female chorus, the Mahotella Queens. This was when mbaqanga really took off – or more specifically, "vocal mbaqanga" (later nicknamed simanje-manje or mgqashiyo). In addition to Mahlathini and the Mahotella Queens, singing stars such as Miriam Makeba, Dolly Rathebe and Letta Mbulu (who had all begun as marabi stars during the '50s) created a large base of fans, as did the Dark City Sisters and The Soul Brothers. Other mbaqanga musicians included Simon Baba Mokoena and West Nkosi, who broke away from the Makgona Tsohle Band in 1990 for a successful solo career until his death in 1998.

=== International popularity ===
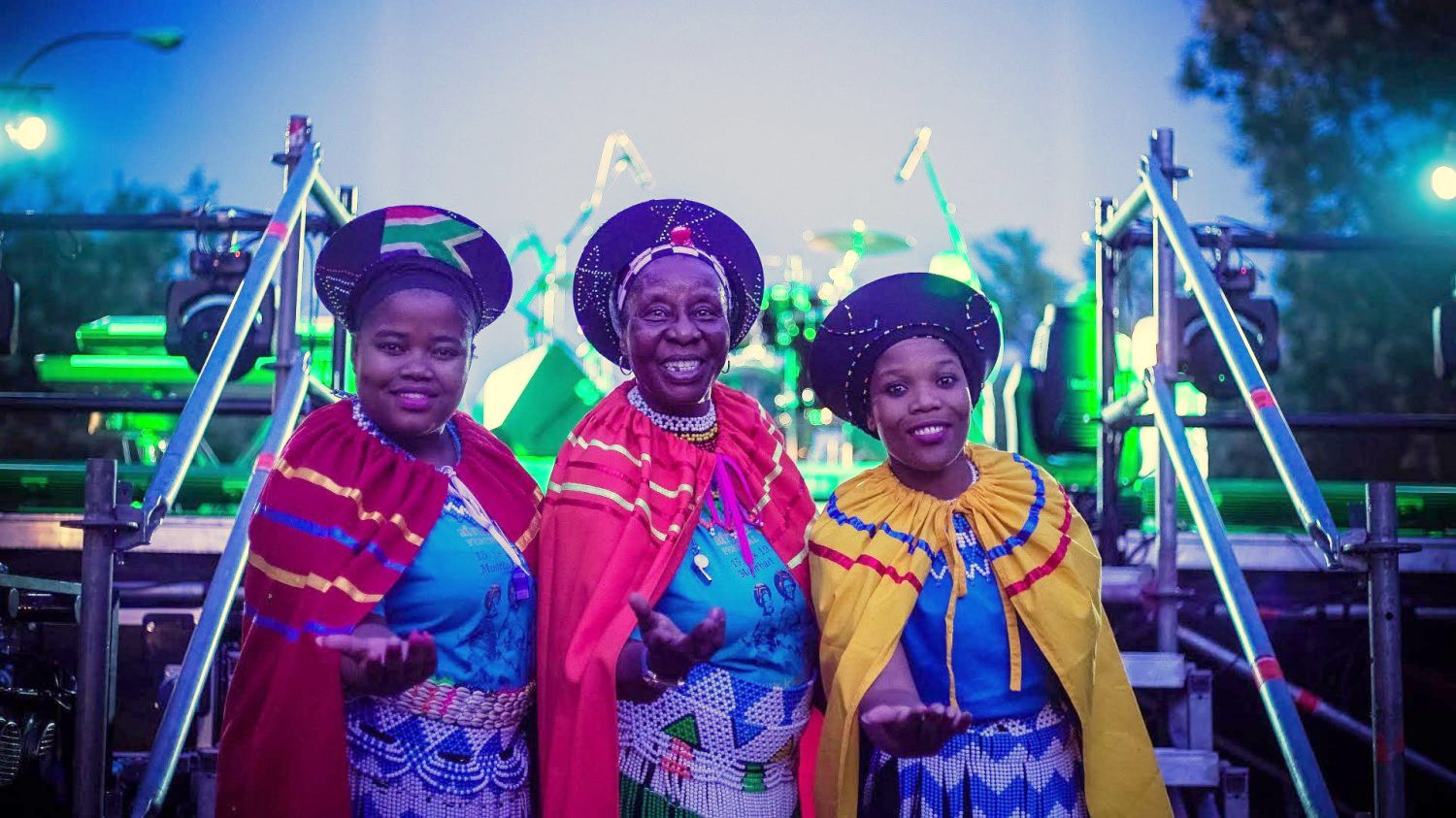
The group Mahotella Queens, pictured in 2017, achieved international success with their take on the traditional mbaqanga sound.

Mbaqanga's popularity faded during the 1970s because of the influence of Western pop, soul and disco into South Africa. Public performances declined because labour migrants no longer wanted to be in the spotlight. Additionally, audiences sought more urbanised language, vocal, and instrumental styles. However, it was revived between 1983 and 1986. The reversal of fortunes was in part due to Paul Simon's incorporation of South African music into his Graceland album (1986) and subsequent tour. Mahlathini and the Mahotella Queens' appearances at festivals in France and at Nelson Mandela's 70th birthday concert in Wembley Stadium, London in 1988 (featuring "white Zulu" Johnny Clegg) signalled its return. White South African musicians influenced by this style include singer songwriter Robin Auld. Veteran Afrikaans piano accordion player Nico Carstens produced a boereqanga hit with Viva Madiba.

Mbaqanga was fully replaced as the dominant music genre in the 1980s by a new urban genre called 'bubblegum.' An Afro-dance pop, Bubblegum was mainly influenced by mbaqanga and other popular African styles. With the introduction of television in 1976, this musical genre was promoted as music across all ethnic groups. Characterized as a representation of a move towards music that was more urban than traditional, the Bubblegum genre had many successful musicians, including Chico Twala, Yvonne Chaka Chaka and Brenda Fassie. The derivation of mbaqanga into bubblegum contributed enormously towards the development of kwaito.

Several mbaqanga acts are still recording and performing today, including the Mahotella Queens and the Soul Brothers. Mbaqanga also continues to influence musicians worldwide. For example, the Norwegian group Real Ones included a tribute track, "All the Way Back (Shades of Mbaqanga)", on their 2003 album This is Camping.
