= Music of South Africa =

The music of South Africa exhibits a culturally varied musical heritage in conjunction with the multi-ethnic populace. Genres with the greatest international recognition being mbube, isicathamiya, mbaqanga, afrofusion, kwaito, South African pop music, afro house, South African hip-hop, Shangaan electro, bacardi house, bolo house, gqom and amapiano.

The country's most internationally recognised and prominent musicians include Solomon Linda, Miriam Makeba, Hugh Masekela, Stimela, Ladysmith Black Mambazo, Ray Phiri, Abdullah Ibrahim, Wouter Kellerman, Brenda Fassie, Seether, Die Antwoord, Jeremy Loops, Yvonne Chaka Chaka, Lucky Dube, Lebo M, Goldfish, Freshlyground, Black Coffee, Anatii, Zakes Bantwini, Master KG, Nomcebo Zikode, Nasty C, and Tyla.

== Pre-20th-century history ==
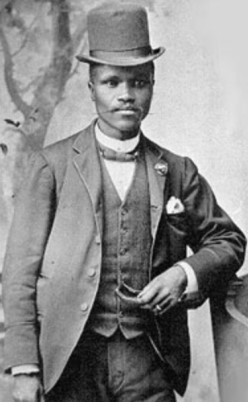
Composer Enoch Sontoga

Early records of music in South Africa as well as Southern Africa indicate a fusion of cultural traditions: African, European and Asian.

The early modern country musician Enoch Sontonga wrote the Southern African national anthem Nkosi Sikelel' iAfrika in 1897. By the end of the nineteenth century, South African cities such as Cape Town had grown large enough to attract foreign musicians, particularly American ragtime players. In the 1890s Orpheus McAdoo's Jubilee Singers popularised African-American spirituals.

Makwaya (meaning "choir") blended European hymnody with African-American spirituals and emphasized close harmony singing.

== Marabi ==
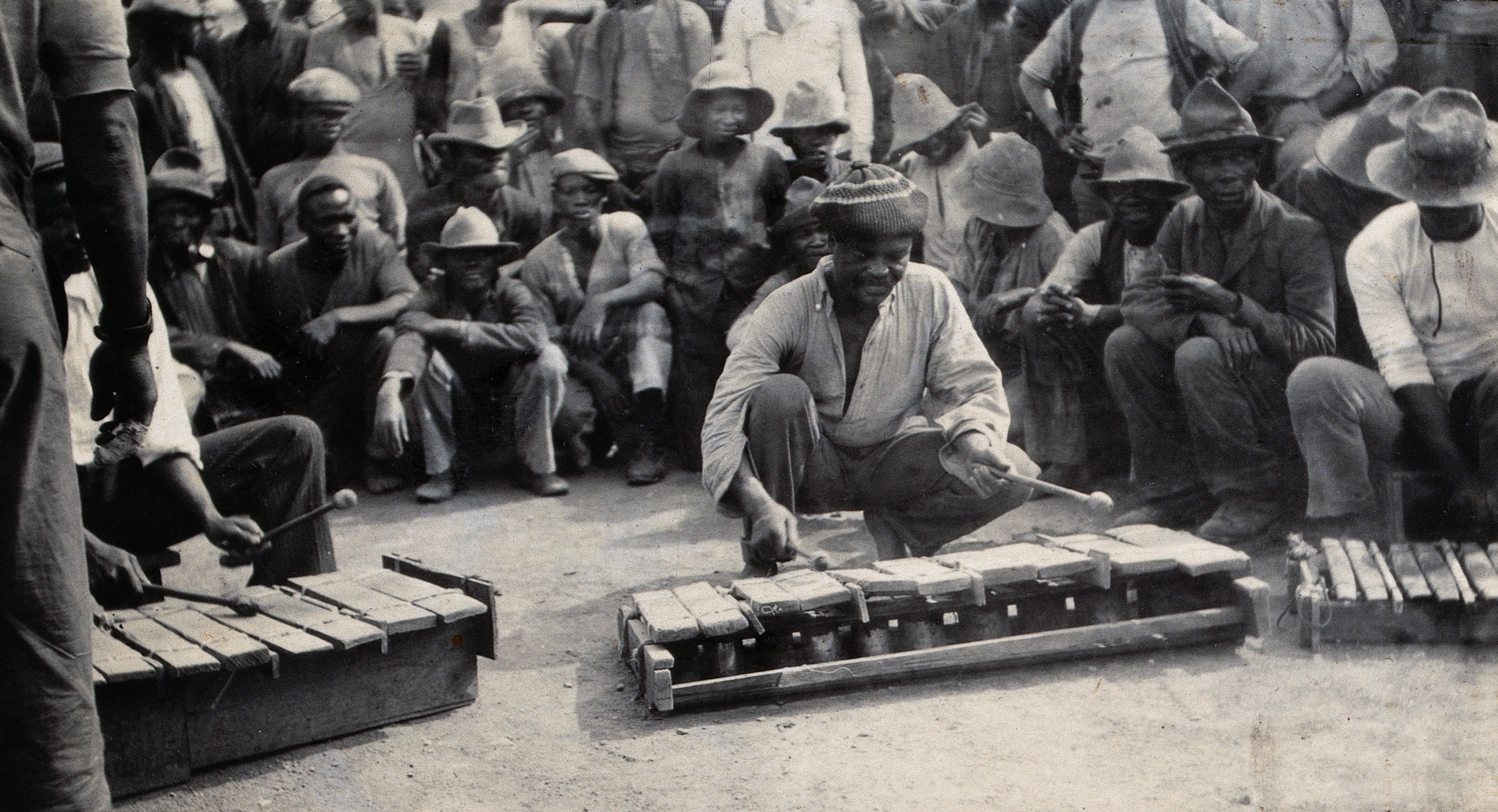
Miners playing instruments at Du Toit's Pan, 1905

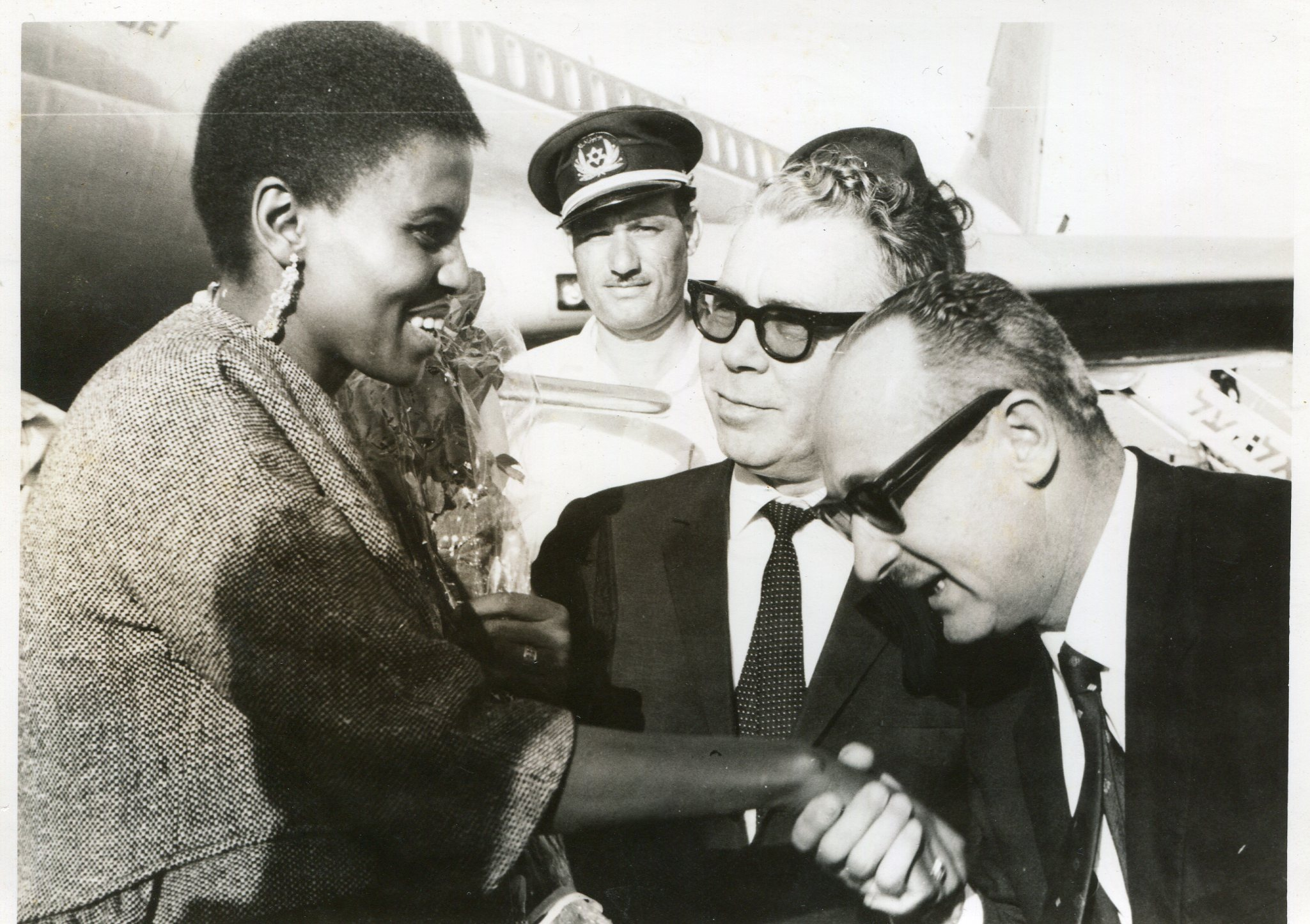
Miriam Makeba in 1963

The discovery of gold, diamonds and other minerals in South Africa during the late 1800s and early 1900s lead to a rapid urbanisation where Black people would leave their villages and move to the city/town so that they could work in the mines to earn a living. However, due to the Natives Land Act, 1913, black people were not allowed to own property even in the city, leading to slums (at that time, townships did not exist yet as they were created during Apartheid which began in 1948) where they could live.

Shebeens arose in the black community, because alcohol was sold and consumed secretly as black South Africans were forbidden from selling alcohol or entering licensed premises starting in 1927. Women resorted to using their traditional beer-brewing skills, learnt in rural areas, to produce and sell traditional beer (locally known as 'Umqombothi') to the new black urban class in these shebeens; hence they became known as "Shebeen Queens".

Eventually, these shebeens would provide a nightlife for people living in the slums, including mineworkers, as they were the only places where people were allowed to express themselves freely. At that time, jazz was the most popular style of music in the urban areas of South Africa, especially in these shebeens. Jazz fused with African traditional music, creating a new musical style and dance genre called "Marabi". By the end of the 1920s, marabi music had become wildly popular in the shebeens. Sophiatown, a vibrant multiracial suburb, was where this genre was pioneered.

Unfortunately, it had also gained a sordid reputation. Drug dealers, criminals, and prostitution were frequently associated with marabi music and marabi dance, which were already looked down upon by White South Africans; it was further shunned by the educated Black classes of South Africans as well.

Despite this, it continued to thrive in the townships around Johannesburg and other major cities. By the 1940s and the 1950s, Marabi was at its peak of popularity in South Africa, having created many stars such as Miriam Makeba, Dolly Rathebe, Hugh Masekela, and Abdullah Ibrahim that became very influential in the South African music scene.

== Gospel ==
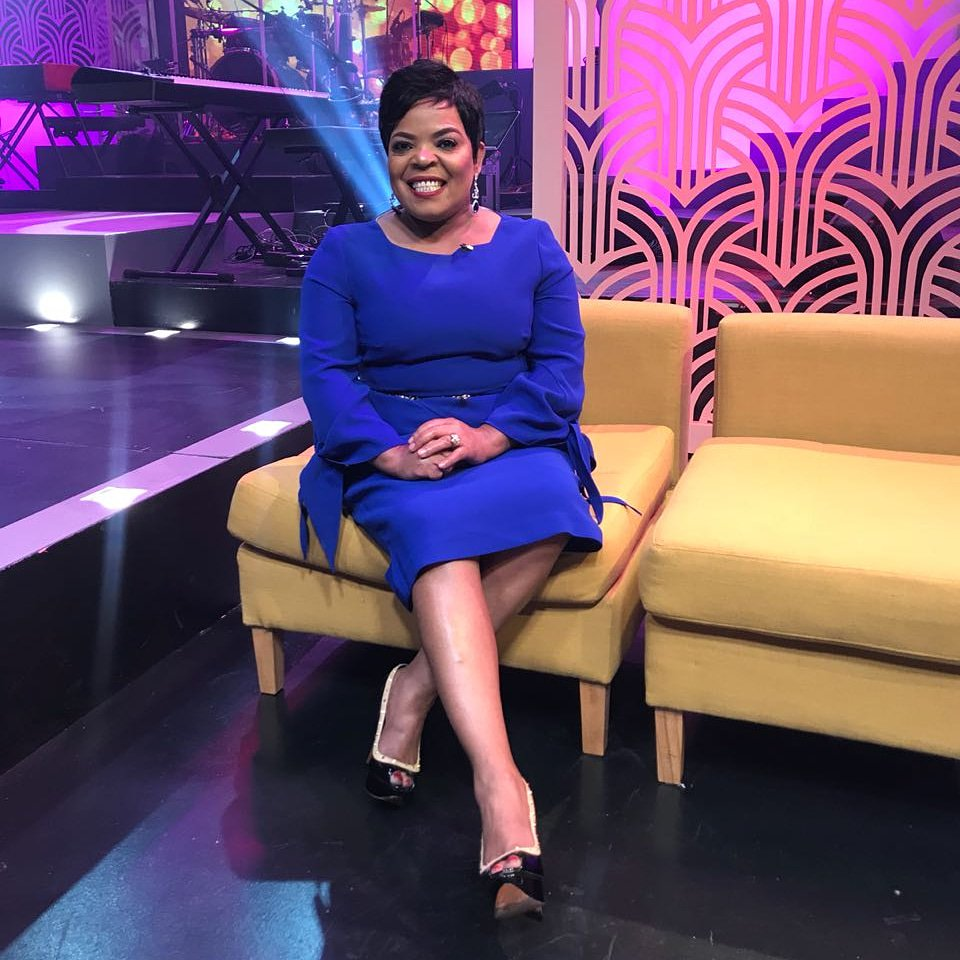
Rebecca Malope

Christianity in South Africa was first introduced during the 1600s when Christian missionaries began arriving from the Netherlands. Missionaries from the United Kingdom, France, Germany, Scandinavia, and the United States began arriving in the early 1800s. Churches and missionary schools were built throughout the country. Native South Africans who were converted to Christianity were taught hymns that were sung in Europe and the US. Newly converted Christians would eventually compose new hymns in their own African languages. An example would be Enoch Sontonga, who composed Nkosi Sikelel' iAfrika.

In the early twentieth century, Zionist Christian churches spread across South Africa. They incorporated African musical elements into their gospel songs. South African gospel became popular in the 1990s, with artists such as Rebecca Malope and Lundi Tyamara. Gqom gospel emerged in the 21st century.

== Neo-traditional styles ==
Traditionally styled music is generally referred to as "Sotho-traditional" or "Zulu-traditional", and has been an essential part of the South African music business since the 1930s. Vocal and concertina records were released in a call-and-response style, with the concertina used as a counterpoint to the lead vocal. Following World War 1, cheap imported concertinas arrived in South Africa, especially the Italian brand Bastari.

=== Sotho-traditional ===
The Sotho musician Tshwatlano Makala was the first traditional musician to achieve widespread commercial success. He helped set the stage for the subsequent rise of Letsema Mat'sela's band, Basotho Dihoba, which drew on styles from his native Lesotho to develop a genre known as mohobelo.

By the 1970s, the concertina in Sotho traditional music had been replaced by an accordion and an electric backing band. This wave of neo-traditional performers was led by Tau Ea Mat'sekha.

=== Zulu ===
The Zulu people adopted the guitar following its introduction by the Portuguese in the sixteenth century, and guitars were locally and cheaply made by the 1930s. John Bhengu was the first major Zulu guitarist, earning a reputation in 1950s Durban for his unique ukupika style of picking (as opposed to traditional strumming). Bhengu's song format, which includes an instrumental introduction (izihlabo), a melody, and spoken praise (ukubonga) for a clan or family, was widely used for a long time in Zulu-traditional music. Bhengu, however, switched to the electric guitar in the late 1960s and began recording as "Phuzushukela" (Sugar Drinker). His popularity surged, and Zulu-traditional music experienced a boom.

Since the 1970s, the concertina has reappeared in Zulu-traditional music, alongside diverse influences from pop music and drum and bass. Vusi Ximba's Siyakudamisa (1992) was perhaps the most memorable Zulu-traditional album of the late twentieth century and drew controversy for its racy, comedic lyrics.

=== Tsonga-traditional ===
Tsonga traditional music was first recorded in the 1950s by Francisco Baloyi for Gallo, and showed a predominantly African style influenced by Latin rhythms. Mozambiquan musicians Fani Pfumo and Alexander Jafete became prominent studio performers in the 1950s and into the next decade. In 1975, however, Mozambique became independent, and Radio Bantu opened a radio station, leading to the abandonment of Portuguese elements in this style.

More modern Tsonga bands, such as General MD Shirinda & the Gaza Sisters play a style called Tsonga disco, featuring a male lead vocalist backed by female singers, a guitar, keyboard or synth, and disco rhythms. Thomas Chauke & the Shinyori Sisters (Tusk Records) have probably become the best-selling band in the neo-traditional style. George Maluleke and Van'wanati Sisters have also been instrumental in modernizing the music by experimenting with faster tempos and indigenous instruments. The most popular Tsonga musicians, however, have arguably been either Thomas Chauke, the pop singer Peta Teanet, or the equally successful Penny Penny, Joe Shirimani. Paul Ndlovu is another artist who has made significant contributions to this genre, with his popular hits Hi ta famba moyeni and Tsakane.

The modern sound of traditional Xitsonga music comprises more of the earlier native sounds that had initially been abandoned in favor of the Portuguese electronic guitars, namely the xylophone and bass marimba. Bands such as Thomas Chauke and the Xinyori Sisters, and George Maluleke predominantly used guitars; however, the modern sound has replaced these with xylophones or bass marimbas. The Tsonga people's preference for the xylophone and marimba type of sound is inherited from the timbila music of the Chopi people, which has been entered into the UNESCO heritage archives as a Masterpiece of the Oral and Intangible Heritage of Humanity.

=== Pedi-traditional ===
Pedi-traditional music is principally harepa and is based on the harp. The German autoharp arrived in South Africa in the nineteenth century, brought by Lutheran ministers proselytising among the Pedi. Harepa has not achieved much mainstream success in South Africa, though there was a brief boom in the 1970s, led by Johannes Mohlala and Sediya dipela Mokgwadi.

=== Venda-traditional ===
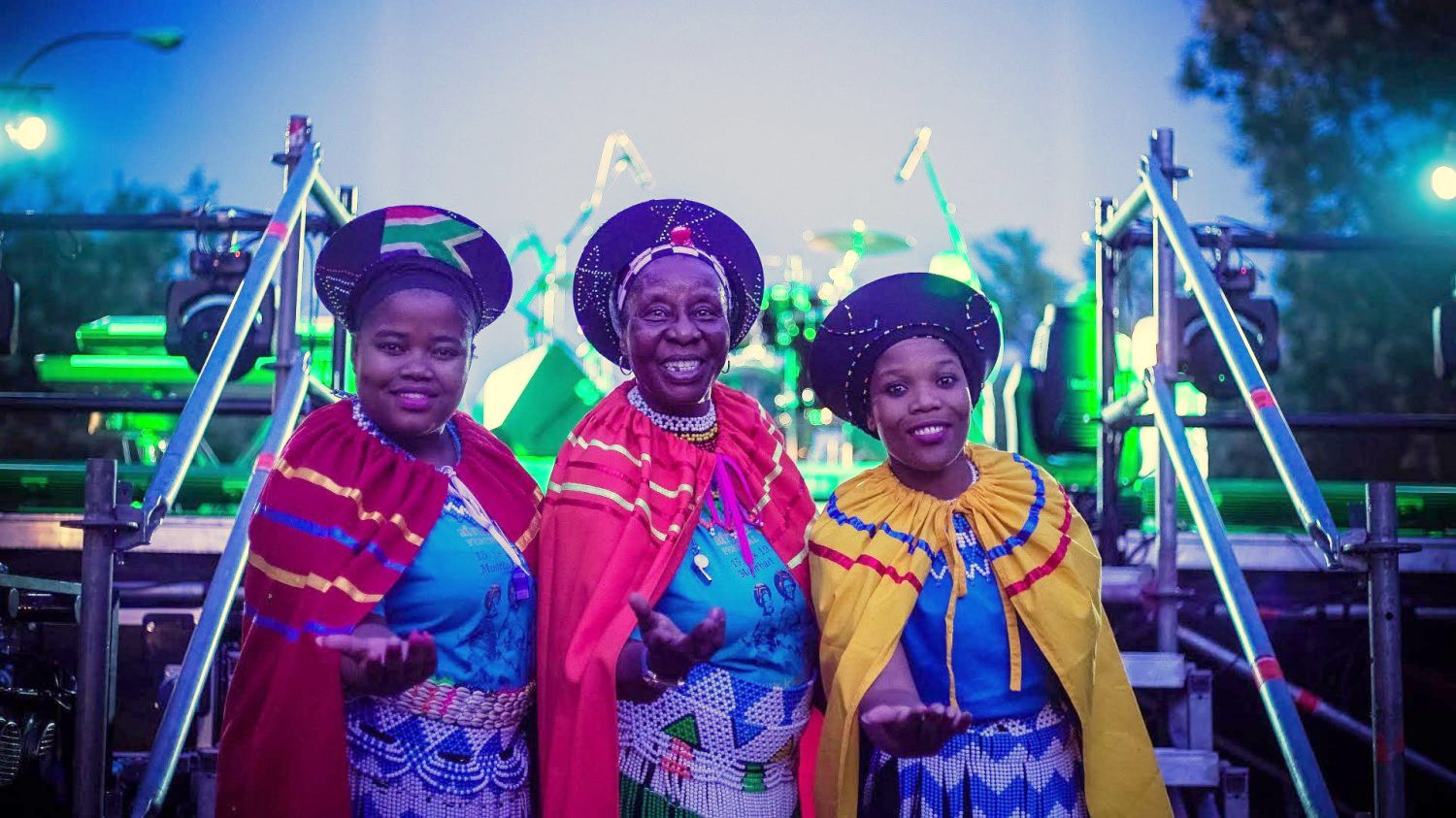
Mahotella Queens

Venda-traditional music was also recorded when black music in South Africa was being recognised. The late 1960s (and, more significantly, the late 1970s) saw a boom in Venda-speaking artists. The launch of a Venda radio station mainly influenced this.

Irene Mawela (who had been singing in the 1960s and 1970s with groups like Mahotella Queens, Sweet Sixteens, and the Dark City Sisters) significantly impacted traditional and contemporary Venda music, despite vocal recordings in Zulu, Sotho, and Xhosa languages. Mawela's 1983 release, Khanani Yanga, was one of the most successful Venda-traditional music albums of that year. After some lean years, Mawela returned to the South African music scene with Tlhokomela Sera, released in December 2007. Mawela's recent songs, such as Mme Anga Khotsi Anga and Nnditsheni, are very popular. Solomon Matase is known for his hits Ntshavheni and Vho i fara Phele.

Alpheus Ramavhea, Mundalamo, Eric Mukhese, and Adziambei Band are also famous for their contributions to Venda music. The latter band continues to produce music with great success, including a recent album, Mutula Gole, released in February 2012. Colbert Mukwevho has been involved with Venda music for over 20 years, beginning with 1980s hits such as "Kha tambe na thanga dzawe", "i do nela rothe", and "saga-saga". In 2006, his comeback album Mulovha namusi na matshelo included the songs "Ndo takala hani" and "Zwa mutani wavho", which remain popular among Venda and Pedi audiences. He grew up in a musical family. His father, Christopher Mukwevho, then the leader of the popular band Thrilling Artist, featured him at a young age. Rudzani Shurflus Ragimana of Shurflus was well known for 'muthu wanga a thi mulitshi', 'shango lo vhifha muvhilini' known for Venda reggae music together with Khakhathi and friends, Tshiganzha, Ntshenge. Artists widely perform reggae music for Tshivenda audiences.

Other performers include: Makhadzi, Fizzy, Prifix, Bhamba, Komrade Li, SubZro, TAKZIT, Humbulani Ramagwedzha, Jahman Chiganja, Khakhathi and Friends, Maduvha Madima, Takalani Mudau, Rapson Mbilummbi Rambuwani, TMan Gavini, Clean-G, Mizo Phyll, Killah Gee, Jininka, Paul Mulaudzi, Malondo Ramulongo, Burning Doctor, Just ice, Lufuno Dagada, and Tshidino Ndou.

Another singer making a name for himself in the South African music market is Tshidino Ndou, a reggae artist who is also the owner of Vhadino Entertainment music company. Tshidino was born and bred in Tshakhuma, a rural village in South Africa's Limpopo Province. So far, he has two albums, Ndi do fa na inwi (2009) (Till death do us part) and Nne Ndi Nne (2010) (I am what I am). His song "Ni songo nyadza" (meaning "do not undermine other people's religions"), featuring the Venda reggae icon Humbulani Ramagwedzha of Thivhulungiwi fame, is receiving extensive media exposure on Phalaphala FM, Soweto TV, Makhado FM, and Univen radio.

Tshidino entered the music scene as a founding member of the Vhadino House Grooves group, which he established alongside his brother, Arthur Ndou, in 2008. They released their debut album, titled Ro Swika, meaning "we have arrived". The album contains a controversial song, "Ri ya groova", widely known as "Ndo Fara Mudifho". He has released a single, "Ri khou phusha life", which has already made a mark on radios and newspapers. The whole album was planned for release in 2012, featuring two other giants: Takalani Mudau of "baby fusheani" fame and the Burning Doctor of "A lu na mutwe" fame. Tshidino is not only a musician but also a prominent film producer, best known in the Venda film industry in Limpopo Province, South Africa. He portrays Vho-Mulingo in the Vho-Mulingo comedy. Other movies he produced include Mathaithai, Hu do dzula nnyi, Mphemphe i a netisa, and Hu bvuma na fhasi.

=== Xhosa-traditional ===
Perhaps the best-known neo-traditional South African music internationally is that of Amampondo and the solo work of their leader and founder, Dizu Plaatjies. He and his group took traditional Xhosa music from the hills of Pondoland and the Eastern Cape and brought it to the stage worldwide. The success of the genre lay in the exponents' integration of music, stage performance, and dance. The great composer Stompie Mavi, who is originally from Nqamakhwe, was also very popular during the 1980s and 1990s. His music was inspired by Xhosa rhythms, cultural values, and social commentary, especially on songs such as Teba and Manyano. Musicians such as Nofinishi Dywili, Madosini, Mantombi Matotiyana, and many others have been at the forefront of traditional Xhosa music. More recently, younger artists such as Indwe and Gatyeni are gaining momentum.

== Classical and art music ==
Classical and art music in South Africa reached its zenith of popularity in the mid-20th century and was primarily composed by a triumvirate of Afrikaner composers known as the "fathers of South African art music". These composers were Arnold van Wyk, Hubert du Plessis, and Stefans Grové. All three composers were White South Africans, yet harbored very different views on Apartheid, which was state policy at the time. Stefans Grové was among the first white composers to incorporate Black African music into his works and openly rejected apartheid ideals in an effort to fuse his "Western art and his physical, African space". Arnold Van Wyk became known for his government-endorsed nationalistic compositions, though he himself was reluctant to support the apartheid administration. Hubert Du Plessis, by contrast, was a strong Afrikaner nationalist and experienced a "growing consciousness" of his heritage, which made him proud to compose such pieces. Du Plessis's works included chamber music, orchestral pieces, and numerous piano pieces.

Wouter Kellerman, a South African flautist, producer, and composer, is a two-time Grammy Award winner.

=== Afrikaans music ===
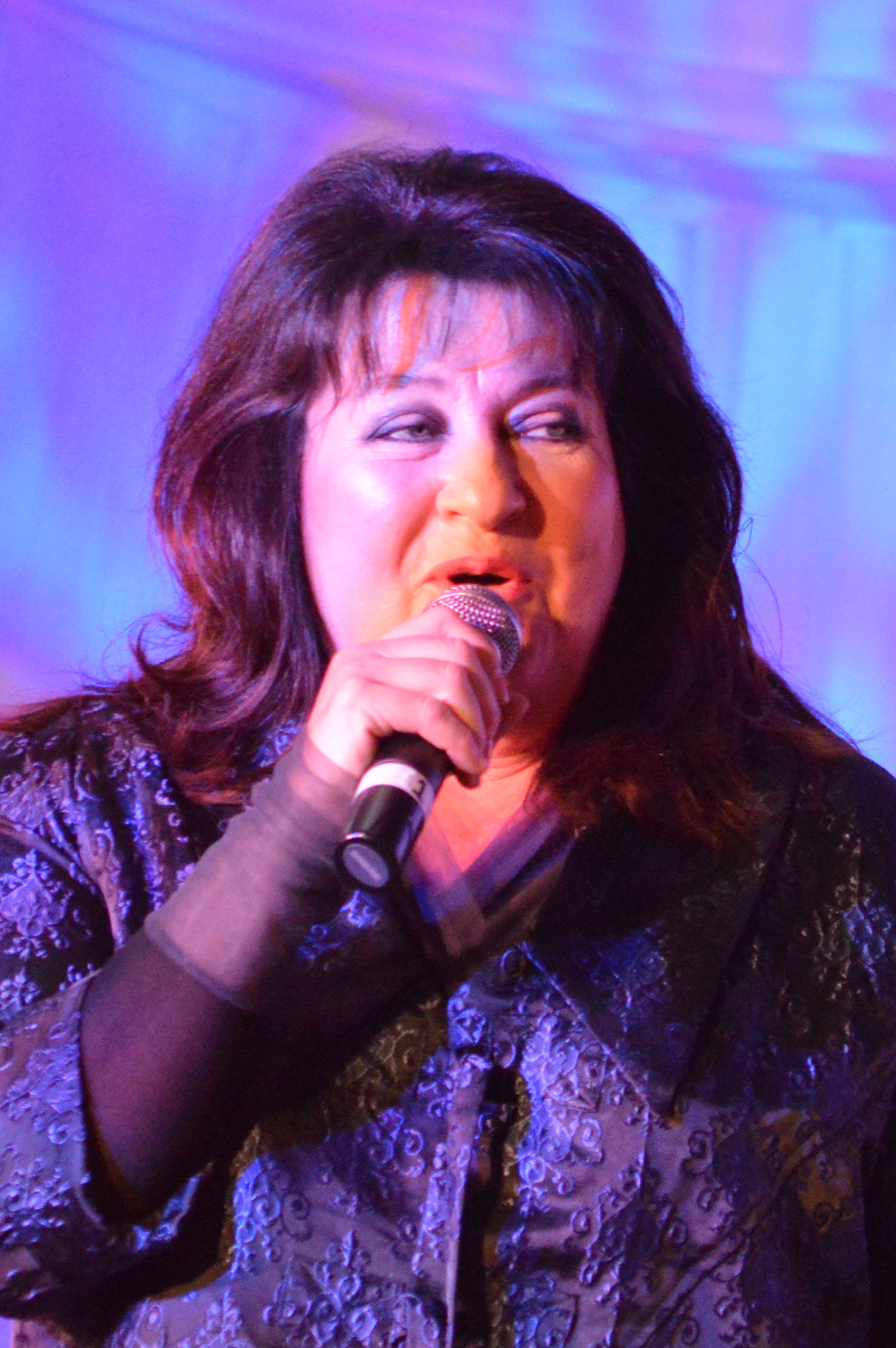
Laurika Rauch

Afrikaans music was primarily influenced by Dutch folk styles, along with French and German influences, in the early twentieth century. Zydeco-type string bands led by a concertina were popular, as were elements of American country music, especially Jim Reeves. The most prolific composers of "tiekie draai" Afrikaans music were lyricist Anton De Waal who wrote many hit songs with songwriters, pianist Charles Segal ("Hey Babariebab Se Ding Is Vim", "Kalkoenjie", "Sy Kom Van Kommetjie" and many others) and accordionist, Nico Carstens. Bushveld music based on the Zulu were reinterpreted by such singers as Marais and Miranda. Melodramatic and sentimental songs called trane trekkers (tearjerkers) were ubiquitous. In 1973, a country music song won the coveted SARI Award (South African Music Industry) for the Song of the Year – "My Children, My Wife" was written by South African composer Charles Segal and lyricist Arthur Roos. In 1979 the South African Music scene changed from the Tranetrekkers to more lively sounds and the introduction of new names in the market with the likes of Anton Goosen, David Kramer (singer), Koos du Plessis, Fanie de Jager, Flaming Victory and Laurika Rauch. Afrikaans music is currently one of the most popular and best-selling genres in South Africa.

After World War I, Afrikaner nationalism spread and such musicians as Jewish pianist and composer Charles Segal and accordionist Nico Carstens were popular.

== 1930s ==
=== A cappella ===
The 1930s saw the spread of Zulu a cappella singing from the Natal area to much of South Africa. The style's popularity finally produced a major star in 1939 with Solomon Linda's Original Evening Birds, whose "Mbube" ("The Lion") was probably the first African recording to sell more than 100,000 copies. It also provided the basis for two further American pop hits, The Weavers' "Wimoweh" (1951) and The Tokens' "The Lion Sleeps Tonight" (1961). Linda's music was in a style that came to be known as mbube. From the late 1940s to the 1960s, a harsh, strident form called isikhwela jo was popular. However, national interest waned in the 1950s until Radio Zulu began broadcasting to Natal, Transvaal and the Orange Free State in 1962 (see 1950s: Bantu Radio and pennywhistle for more details).

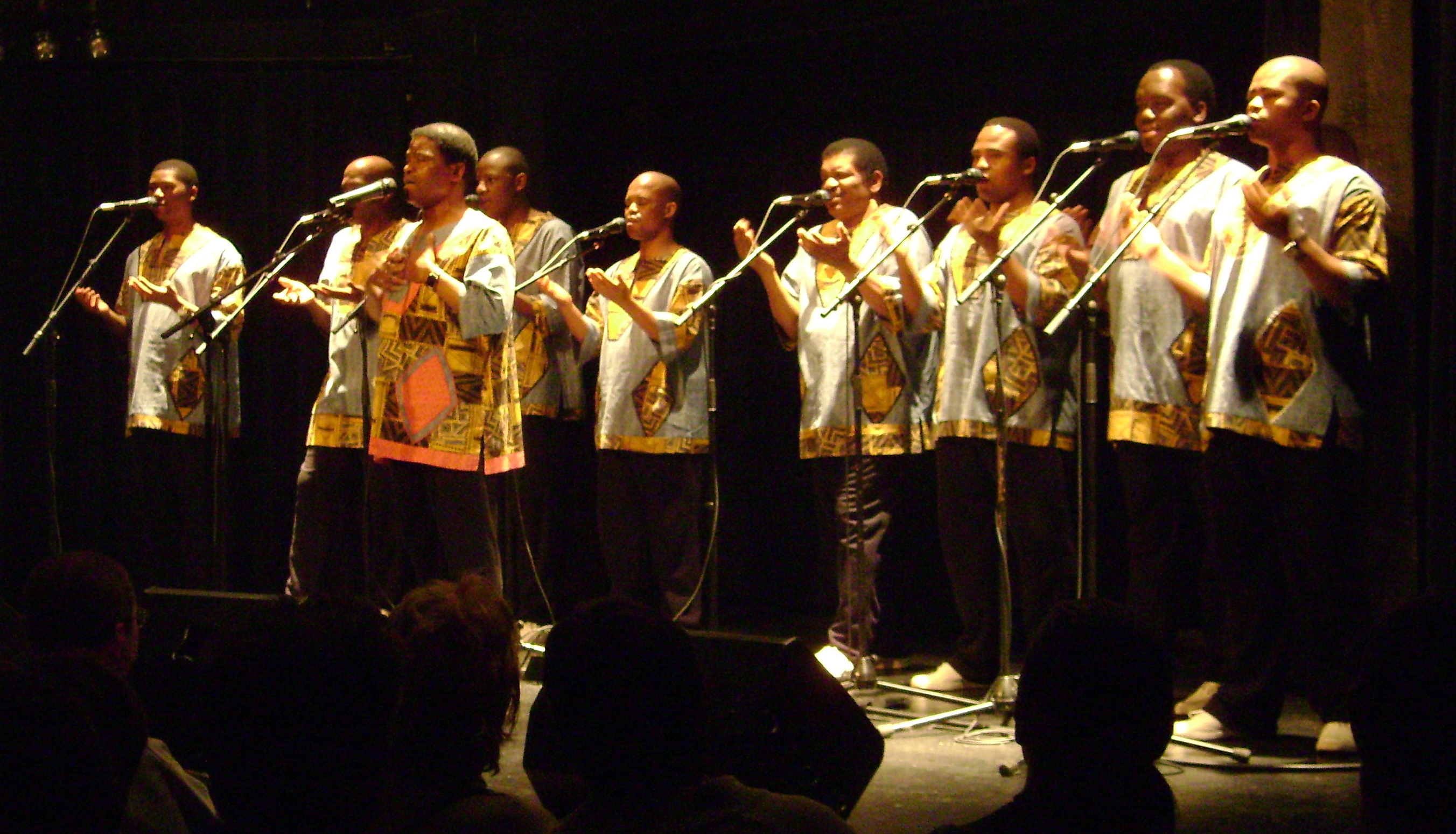
Ladysmith Black Mambazo performing in Austria, 2008

Also formed in this era was the Stellenbosch University Choir, part of the University of Stellenbosch, the oldest continuously running choir in the country, founded in 1936 by William Morris, who was also the first conductor of the Choir. The current conductor is Andre van der Merwe. They specialise in a cappella music and consist of students from the University.

Ladysmith Black Mambazo, a male a cappella ensemble, is regarded as a national treasure in South Africa. The band's origins can be traced to a series of dreams experienced by Joseph Shabalala in 1964. In these dreams, Shabalala envisioned the melodies that would define the group's distinctive sound. As of 2024, the ensemble has forged a four-decade history with the Grammy Awards, amassing 17 nominations and obtaining five Grammys.

== 1950s ==
=== Bantu Radio and the music industry ===
By the 1950s, the music industry had diversified greatly and included several major labels. Innovative musician and composer Charles Segal was the first white musician to work with indigenous African peoples, recording tribal performers and promoting African music overseas beginning in the 1950s. Charles Segal was also the first white musician to write in the indigenous African style and to bring the African music genre into the commercial market. His single "Africa" was a hit among South Africa's diverse population in the 1960s, and he continued to produce, record, and teach his distinctive style of African music, a blend of African and Jazz influences. These compositions include "Opus Africa", "African Fantasy", "Kootanda", and many more. In 1962, the South African government launched a development programme for Bantu Radio to foster separate development and encourage independence for the Bantustans. Although the government had expected Bantu Radio to play folk music, African music had evolved into numerous pop genres, and nascent recording studios used radio to promote their pop stars. The new focus on radio led to a government crackdown on lyrics, censoring songs deemed a "public hazard".

=== Pennywhistle jive ===
The first major style of South African popular music to emerge was pennywhistle jive (later known as kwela). Black cattle-herders had long played a three-holed reed flute, adopting a six-holed flute when they moved to the cities. Willard Cele is usually credited with creating the pennywhistle by placing the six-holed flute between his teeth at an angle. Cele spawned a legion of imitators and fans, especially after appearing in the 1951 film The Magic Garden (film).

Groups of flautists played on the streets of South African cities in the 1950s, many of them in white areas, where police would arrest them for creating a public disturbance. Some young white men were attracted to the music and came to be known as ducktails. The 1950s also saw 'coloured' bands develop the new genre of Quela, a hybrid of South African Squares and modern samba. Once again, we see the cross-over between white, Afrikaans music and the indigenous South Africa music in the compositions of pianist and composer, Charles Segal, with his penny whistle hits including "Kwela Kwela" and many others.

== 1960s ==
In the 1960s, a smooth form of mbube, called cothoza mfana, emerged, led by the King Star Brothers, who had invented the isicathamiya style by the end of the decade.

By the 1960s, the saxophone was commonplace in jive music, whose performance continued to be restricted to townships. The genre was called sax jive and later mbaqanga. Mbaqanga literally means "dumpling" but connotes "homemade" and was coined by Michael Xaba, a jazz saxophonist who disliked the new style.

The early 1960s also saw performers such as bassist Joseph Makwela and guitarist Marks Mankwane incorporate electric instruments and influences from marabi and kwela into the mbaqanga style, resulting in a funkier, more African sound.

Mbaqanga developed vocal harmonies in the early 1960s, when groups such as The Skylarks and the Manhattan Brothers began imitating American vocal bands, primarily doo wop. Rather than African-American four-part harmonies, however, South African bands employed five-part harmonies. The Dark City Sisters were the most popular vocal group in the early 1960s, known for their sweet style. Aaron Jack Lerole of Black Mambazo added groaning male vocals to the female harmonies, later being replaced by Simon 'Mahlathini' Nkabinde, who has become perhaps the most influential and well-known South African "groaner" of the twentieth century. Marks Mankwane and Joseph Makwela's mbaqanga innovations evolved into the more danceable mgqashiyo sound when the two joined forces with Mahlathini and the new female group Mahotella Queens, in Mankwane's backing group Makhona Tsohle Band (also featuring Makwela along with saxophonist-turned-producer West Nkosi, rhythm guitarist Vivian Ngubane, and drummer Lucky Monama). The Mahlathini and the Mahotella Queens/Makhona Tsohle outfit recorded as a studio unit for Gallo Record Company, achieving significant national success and pioneering mgqashiyo music across the country.

In 1967, Miriam Makeba released the US hit "Pata Pata". 1967, Izintombi Zesi Manje Manje, an mgqashiyo female group that provided intense competition for Mahotella Queens. Both groups were massive competitors in the jive field, though the Queens usually came out on top.

=== Soul and jazz ===
The late 1960s saw the rise of soul music from the United States. Wilson Pickett and Percy Sledge were among singers who were especially popular and inspired South African performers to enter the field, using an organ, a bass-and-drum rhythm section, and an electric guitar.

In the 1960s, jazz split into two fields. Dance bands like the Elite Swingsters were popular, while avant-garde jazz inspired by the work of John Coltrane, Thelonious Monk, and Sonny Rollins was also common. The latter field of musicians included prominent activists and thinkers, including Hugh Masekela, Abdullah Ibrahim (formerly known as 'Dollar Brand'), Kippie Moeketsi, Sathima Bea Benjamin, Chris McGregor, Johnny Dyani and Jonas Gwangwa. In 1959, American pianist John Mehegan organised a recording session featuring many of South Africa's most prominent jazz musicians, resulting in the first two African jazz LPs. The following year saw the Cold Castle National Jazz Festival, which brought additional attention to South African jazz. Cold Castle became an annual event for a few years and attracted more musicians, especially Dudu Pukwana, Gideon Nxumalo, and Chris McGregor. The 1963 festival produced an LP called Jazz The African Sound, but government oppression soon ended the jazz scene. Again, many musicians emigrated or went into exile in the UK or other countries.

In 1968, Hugh Masekela got a big hit with "Grazing in the Grass", and it reached No.1 on the Billboard pop chart. While the African jazz of northern South Africa was being promoted in Johannesburg, musicians in Cape Town were becoming aware of their jazz heritage. Pianist Charles Segal, who had moved from Pretoria to Cape Town, brought an enthusiasm for jazz after several trips to the US, where he met and was influenced by the jazz pianist Oscar Peterson. The port city had a long history of musical interaction with seafaring players. The rise of the Coon Carnival and the visionary talent of Abdullah Ibrahim (Dollar Brand) and his sax players Basil Coetzee and Robbie Jansen led to Cape Jazz. It was an improvised version of their folk songs, with musical references to European and American jazz, which, some 20 years later, would become South Africa's most crucial jazz export.

== 1970s–1980s ==
=== Mgqashiyo and Isicathamiya ===
By the 1970s, only a few long-standing mgqashiyo groups were well known, and the only new groups to achieve success employed all-male lineups. Abafana Baseqhudeni and Boyoyo Boys were perhaps the most prominent new stars of this period. The Mahotella Queens' members began leaving the lineup around 1971 to join rival groups. Gallo, by far the largest record company in South Africa, began assembling a new Mahotella Queens lineup and recorded them with Abafana Baseqhudeni. Lead groaner Mahlathini had already moved to the rival label EMI (in early 1972), where he had successful records with backing group Ndlondlo Bashise and the new female group the Mahlathini Girls. The new Mahotella Queens lineup at Gallo achieved as much success as the original Queens, recording both with and without new male vocalists, such as Robert Mbazo Mkhize of Abafana Baseqhudeni.

Ladysmith Black Mambazo, led by Joseph Shabalala, the soprano, emerged in the 1960s and became perhaps the most prominent isicathamiya stars in South Africa's history. Their first album was 1973's Amabutho, which was also the first gold record by black musicians; it sold over 25,000 copies. Ladysmith Black Mambazo remained popular throughout the next few decades, especially after 1986, when Paul Simon, an American musician, included Ladysmith Black Mambazo on his extremely popular Graceland album and its subsequent tour of 1987.

With progressive jazz hindered by governmental suppression, marabi-styled dance bands rose to more critical prominence in the jazz world. The music became more complex and retained popularity, while progressive jazz produced only occasional hits, such as Winston Ngozi's "Yakal Nkomo" and Abdullah Ibrahim's "Mannenberg".

=== Disco ===
In the middle of the 1970s, American disco was introduced in South Africa, and disco beats were incorporated into soul music, helping to halt the popularity of mbaqanga bands such as the Mahotella Queens. In 1976, South African children rebelled en masse against apartheid and governmental authority, and a vibrant, youthful counterculture was created, with music as an integral part of its focus. Styles from before the 1970s fusion of disco and soul were not widely regarded and were perceived as being sanctioned by the white oppressors. Few South African bands achieved lasting success during this period; however, the Movers were an exception, incorporating marabi elements into their soul. The Movers were followed by the Soul Brothers, and the instrumental band The Cannibals, who soon began working with singer Jacob "Mpharanyana" Radebe. The coloured (not black) band The Flames also gained a following, and soon contributed two members (Blondie Chaplin and Ricky Fataar) to American band The Beach Boys. Harari emerged in their place, eventually adopting an almost entirely rock-and-roll sound. One of Harare's members, Sipho 'Hotstix' Mabuse became a superstar in the 1980s.

== South African rock music ==
=== Afro rock ===
Afro rock, characterised by its fusion of Western rock music with African musical elements, emerged in the late 1960s and early 1970s, with bands and artists such as Assagai. The original lineup of Assagai comprised five members, three hailing from South Africa and two from Nigeria: Louis Moholo on drums, Mongezi Feza on trumpet and flute, Dudu Pukwana on alto saxophone, Bizo Mngqikana on tenor saxophone, and Fred Coker on guitar and bass. According to Rob Fitzpatrick of The Guardian, Coker played a pivotal role in positioning Assagai as significant competition to Ghana's Osibisa, before departing to join Osibisa, replacing Spartacus R. Keyboardist Alan Gowen from the Canterbury scene and percussionist Jamie Muir from King Crimson briefly joined the band from 1971 to 1972.

Operating under the British label Vertigo Records, Assagai is believed to be the sole African or "Black" band ever signed by the label. Their eponymous debut album, featuring collaborations with African musicians such as Terri Quaye, was released in 1971. Repertoire Records reissued Assagai on CD in 1994. Their second and final album, Zimbabwe, adorned with cover art by Roger Dean, also released in 1971, was later reissued as AfroRock by the Music for Pleasure record label. Both albums featured compositions by members of the British group Jade Warrior, with guest appearances from them as well.

In the 1960s, Pukwana, Feza, and Moholo had been part of the jazz ensemble The Blue Notes alongside Chris McGregor.

=== Punk rock ===
During the punk rock boom of the late 1970s, UK and American punk music influenced South African bands such as Wild Youth and Powerage and gained a cult following centered in Durban and in and around Johannesburg. Bands such as Dog Detachment, The Radio Rats, and Young Dumb & Violent had a similar following on the fringes of the music scene. Cape Town had a big following with Safari Suits, Housewife's Choice, The Lancaster Band, The News and Permanent Force (aka Private File after BOSS intervention), soon followed by The Rude Dementals, The Zero's, Fred Smith Band, Red Army, Riot Squad, Injury Time, and The Vipers. In Cape Town, many gigs took place at "Scratch" Club (run by Gerry Dixon and Henry Coombes), 1886, UCT, Off The Road, numerous town halls, and other local venues. Some of the aforementioned bands toured. The "RIOT ROCK" tour of December 1979 was a culmination of the period. National Wake was a multiracial punk rock band in the late 1970s. They were created in protest of the apartheid regime. They were South Africa's first multiracial punk band.

=== Rock ===
There was a thriving, primarily white, rock music scene in Cape Town in the 1970s. The album McCully Workshop Inc. from the psychedelic rock band McCully Workshop is a good example of the genre. The Trutone label was owned by South African company Gallo (Africa) Limited, an internationally recognised music producer.

=== Alternative rock and Afrikaans ===
The early 1980s brought widespread attention to alternative rock bands such as The Usual and Scooter's Union. In and around Johannesburg the growth of the independent music scene led to not just a surge of bands ranging from big names (relatively speaking) Tribe After Tribe, The Dynamics, The Softies and the Spectres through to smaller hopefuls What Colours, Days Before and No Exit, but also to the growth of a vibrant DIY fanzine scene with "Palladium" and "One Page to Many" two titles of note.

South African alternative rock became more mainstream, with two leading bands, Asylum Kids from Johannesburg and Peach from Durban, achieving chart success and releasing critically acclaimed albums. The burgeoning music scene around Johannesburg saw a surge of small bands, inspired and informed by the UK DIY punk ethic, form and start performing at a growing number of venues from clubs the likes of Metalbeat, Bluebeat, King of Clubs, DV8 and Dirtbox to student run venues such as GR Bozzoli Hall and later the Free People Concert on the University of the Witwatersrand campus.

One artist of specific note to come from this era was James Phillips who was involved with several influential bands including Corporal Punishment; Cherry Faced Lurchers; and his Afrikaans alter ego Bernoldus Niemand (roughly translates as Bernard Nobody). Through his Bernoldus Niemand character, James managed to cross the language divide and influence a wide range of Afrikaans-speaking musicians with the same punk ethic that had inspired him; as a result, a critical Afrikaans alternative rock scene emerged from this influence.

During this period, the only Afrikaners to achieve much mainstream fame were Anton Goosen, a rock singer-songwriter, and Bles Bridges, an imitator of American lounge singer Wayne Newton.

=== Gothic rock ===
In 1983, Dog Detachment was among the earliest groups to combine post-punk music with elements of gothic rock. South Africa's first Gothic rock band was No Friends of Harry, formed in the mid-1980s. Other notable bands from the second half of the 1980s are The Gathering (not to be confused with the Dutch Metal band), The Death Flowers of No-cypher, Lidice, Attic Muse, The Autumn Ritual, The Elephant Celebes, and Penguins in Bondage.

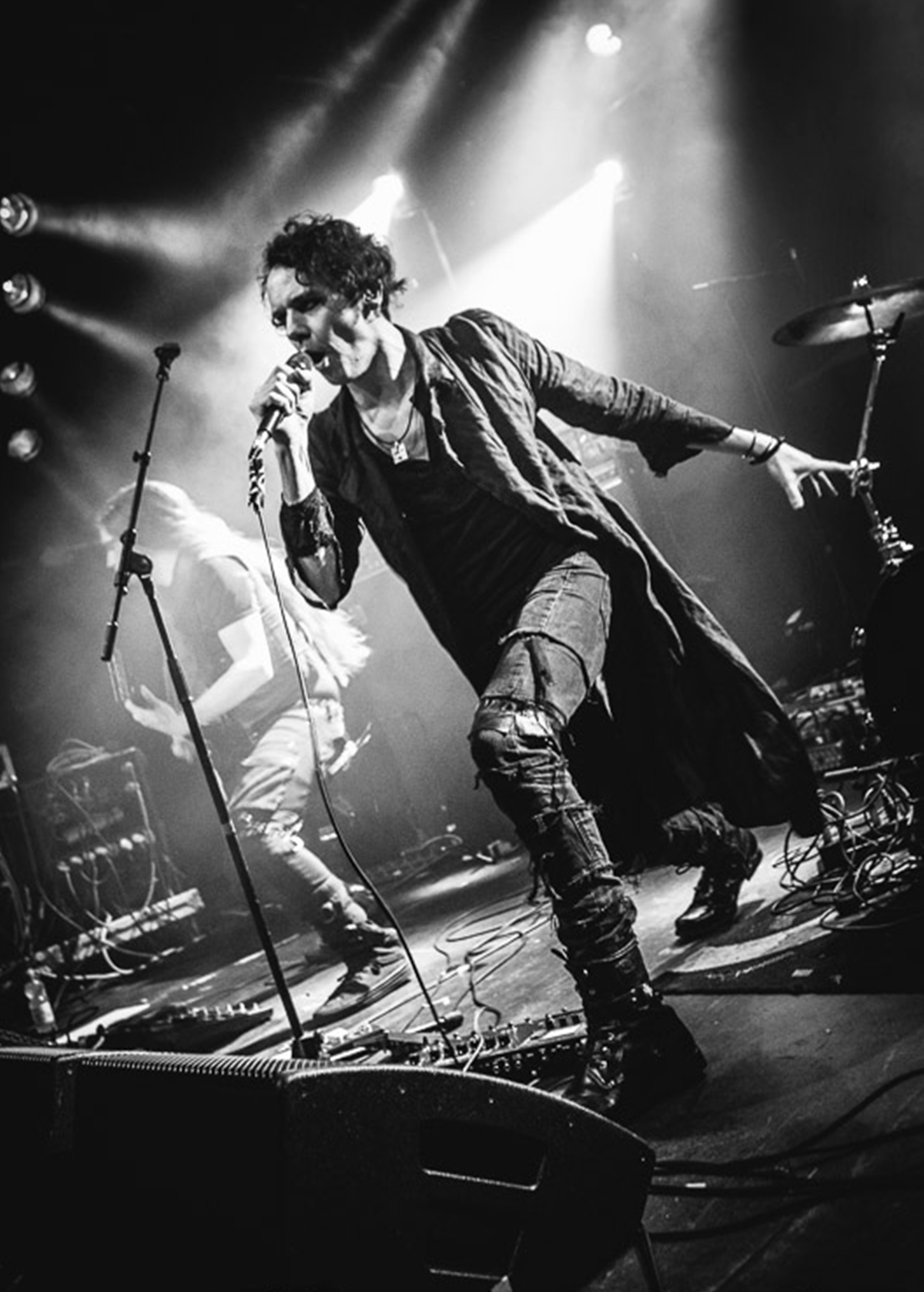
The Awakening

In 1995, The Awakening was formed by vocalist, guitarist, and producer Ashton Nyte. The band is credited in major national press as "South Africa's most successful Gothic Rock act and one of the top bands in the far broader Alternative scene" and headlined major national festivals throughout South Africa, including the country's largest music festival Woodstock, in addition to Oppikoppi and RAMFest. With more than a dozen top ten national singles between 1998 and 2007, The Awakening were the first goth-styled act to have significant success in South Africa.

Another notable goth artist was The Eternal Chapter, which had a hit with the cover "Here comes the man", originally by Boom Boom Room.

== South African pop music ==
=== Afro fusion ===
Stimela originated from Ray Phiri's soul group, The Cannibals, formed in the 1970s. Phiri, known for his work on Paul Simon's albums Graceland and The Rhythm of the Saints, led The Cannibals to success with several hit singles in South Africa. In the early 1980s, Phiri collaborated with former members of The Cannibals to form Stimela, an Afro-fusion band (meaning "steam train"). Fusing R&B and jazz with rhythmic elements from South African genres such as mbaqanga and Stimela, Stimela was led by Phiri, who served as guitarist, songwriter, and often lead vocalist. The band sang in English and various South African languages, including recording songs in the Malawian language, Chichewa, amidst the apartheid-era promotion of "retribalization" in black music.

During the 1980s and early 1990s, Stimela's music occasionally challenged apartheid's boundaries of expression. Certain songs, like "Whispers in the Deep" advocating for fearless expression, faced bans from airing on the state-controlled radio station, SABC. Additionally, a 1984 duet featuring a white singer, Katie Pennington, titled "Where Did We Go Wrong" was rejected by radio stations for airplay. Despite these restrictions, Stimela's 1986 album, "Look, Listen and Decide" achieved significant commercial success, reaching bestseller status. The band's albums attained gold and platinum status.

Stimela debuted at a pivotal moment, filling the void left by the afrofusion band Sakhile's hiatus. Sankomota (previously known as 'Uhuru'), an afrofusion group formed in Lesotho in the 1970s, gained prominence when their debut album was recorded by South African producer Lloyd Ross in 1983. Sankomota's hit composition "It's Raining" propelled their success, leading to subsequent album releases and a move to South Africa. Bassist Bakithi Khumalo and drummer Vusi Khumalo, later forming the band Theta, provided rhythms for country and Western bands. Tananas, another South African fusion band formed in 1987, blended jazz, country, Congolese rumba, rock, township jazz, ragtime, township jive, Mozambican salsa, and Spanish music. Peace released their debut record and performed alongside Abdullah Ibrahim (Dollar Brand) and Hugh Masekela. The collective Night Cruiser featured in Zakes Mda's plays at the Space Theatre.

=== Tsapiky ===
Tsapiky is a music genre originating in Madagascar, in the Toliara Province. It emerged as a blend of South African pop, initially heard on Mozambican radio stations, and indigenous Malagasy tradition during the 1970s. The genre's rhythms encompass rapid tempos.

=== Pop ===
P J Powers won the 1986 Song for South Africa competition, the first one run by the SABC. It aimed to promote South African music. The winning song was Don Clarke's Sanbonani. The final round was televised on national TV, with P J Powers supported by her band, Hotline. Sanbonani featured on the P J Powers and Hotline Greatest Hits album in 1991.

=== International attention ===
The original Mahotella Queens line-up reunited with Mahlathini and the Makgona Tsohle Band in 1983, due to unexpected demand from mgqashiyo and mbaqanga fans. Ladysmith Black Mambazo took their first step into the international arena via Paul Simon on his Graceland album in 1986, where a series of reissue albums by US label Shanachie sold very well. Mambazo became world-renowned, touring internationally and collaborating with various Western musicians to considerable success. "Graceland" won many awards, including the Grammy Award for Best Album of the Year. A year later, Simon produced Black Mambazo's first U.S. release, Shaka Zulu, which won the Grammy Award for Best Traditional Folk Album in 1988. Since then, the group has received 15 Grammy Award Nominations and 3 Grammy Award wins, including 1 in 2009. The Graceland album not only propelled Mambazo into the spotlight, but paved the way for other South African acts (including Mahlathini and the Queens, Amaswazi Emvelo, Moses Mchunu, Ray Phiri and Stimela, The Mighty Soul beat and others) to become known worldwide as well.

World in Union, the Ladysmith Black Mambazo record feat. PJ Powers became an international hit record in 1995. It charted in the UK (no 47 on the singles charts).

Johnny Clegg got his start in the 1970s playing Zulu-traditional music with Sipho Mchunu, and became prominent as the only major white musician playing traditional black music, achieving success in France as "Le Zoulou Blanc" (The White Zulu). The 1980s also saw a resurgence of rock and roll bands, including The Helicopters, Petit Cheval, Sterling, and Tellinger.

Mango Groove has gotten lots of recognition over the years and has firmly established itself as one of South Africa's most recognized and loved music icons. The group gained national prominence with the release of its debut album in 1989. Amongst other things, this included Mango Groove being the only South African act invited to perform at the 1997 handover of Hong Kong to China, being the only South African act featured on The Freddie Mercury Tribute concert (broadcast to over a billion people), appearing in front of 200, 000 people at the SOS Racisme concert in Paris and receiving 3 encores at the Montrieux Jazz Festival.

=== Reggae ===
The most lasting change, however, may have been the importation of reggae from Jamaica. Following international superstar Bob Marley's 1980 concert celebrating Zimbabwe's independence, reggae took hold across Africa. Lucky Dube was the first major South African artists; his style was modelled most closely on that of Peter Tosh. By the 1990s, Lucky Dube was among the best-selling artists in South African history, particularly with his 1990 album Slave. The 1990s also saw Jamaican music move towards ragga, an electronic style that was more influential on kwaito (South African hip-hop) than reggae. A group from the Free State called Oyaba also emerged during this period. Their best-known hit songs are "Tomorrow Nation", "Paradise", and "Love Crazy." Reggae became popular, and there was also a singer from KwaZulu-Natal, Sipho Johnson, known as Jambo.

=== Township pop (Bubblegum) ===
Township pop also improperly referred to as "bubblegum" is a form of South African pop music that arose in the middle of the 1980s, distinctively based on vocals with overlapping call-and-response vocals. Electronic keyboards and synthesizers are commonplace. Dan Tshanda of the band Splash was the first major bubblegum star, followed by Sello Chicco Twala. Twala introduced some politically oriented lyrics, such as "We Miss You Manelo" (a coded tribute to Nelson Mandela) and "Papa Stop the War", a collaboration with Mzwakhe Mbuli.

In 1983, a major new South African star was born, Brenda Fassie. Her single, "Weekend Special", announced her as the pre-eminent female South African vocalist of her generation. She remained unmatched in popularity and talent until her untimely death in 2004.

The late 1980s saw the rise of Yvonne Chaka Chaka, beginning with her 1984 hit "I'm in Love With a DJ", which was the first major bubblegum hit. Her popularity continued to rise into the 1990s, particularly across the rest of Africa and into Europe. Jabu Khanyile's Bayete and teen heart-throb Ringo have also become very popular.

=== Voëlvry movement ===
Afrikaans-language music saw a resurgence in the 1980s as the Voëlvry ("free as a bird" or "outlawed") movement reflected a new Afrikaans artistic counter-culture largely hostile to the values of the National Party and conservative Afrikanerdom. Spearheaded by the singer-songwriter Johannes Kerkorrel and his Gereformeerde Blues Band, the movement (which was named after Kerkorrel's 1989 regional tour) also included musicians Bernoldus Niemand (aka James Phillips) and Koos Kombuis. Voëlvry tapped into growing dissatisfaction with the Apartheid system among white Afrikaans speakers; thus, it represents the musical branch of the opposition, paralleled by literature and the arts.

== 1990s ==
=== New rhythms ===
In 1994, South African media were liberalised, and new musical styles emerged. Prophets of Da City became known as a premier hip-hop crew, though a South Africanised style of hip-hop, known as kwaito, soon supplanted traditional hip-hop groups. In kwaito, synthesizers and other electronic instruments are common, and slow jams derived from Chicago house musicians such as The Fingers, Tony Humphries, and Robert Owen are also standard. Stars of kwaito include Trompies, Bongo Maffin, TKZee, Mandoza and Boom Shaka. The band Tree63 also emerged, first known for their hit single "A Million Lights" and later popularised by their version of Matt Redman's "Blessed Be Your Name".

=== Gospel ===
The biggest star of the 1990s gospel was Rebecca Malope, whose 1995 album Shwele Baba was extremely popular. Malope continues to record, in addition to performers such as Lusanda Spiritual Group, Barorisi Ba Morena, Amadodana Ase Wesile, Vuyo Mokoena, and International Pentacoastal Church Choir, Rayreed Soul Beat, Lundi, Joyous Celebration, and Scent From Above, who have performed in Botswana occasionally. In the 2000s, Vuyo Mooena emerged as the best-selling Gospel artist. His albums have been ranked among the country's top 5 best-selling albums. On his album, he sang in all South African languages, including Venda, Shangaan, Sotho, Zulu, and Xhosa. The industry has also been joined by Hlengiwe Mhlaba (whose Aphendule is popular) and Solly Moholo. We also see new singers, such as Oleseng Shuping, gain popularity; he won the King of Gospel Award.

=== Afrikaans music ===
Prof Piet de Villiers was the frontrunner before 1994 with his compositions of Boerneef.

The period after 1994 saw a dramatic growth in the popularity of Afrikaans music. Numerous new young Afrikaans singers (soloists and groups) released CDs and DVDs. They attracted large audiences at "kunstefeeste" (art festivals) such as the "Klein Karoo Nasionale Kunstefees – KKNK" in Oudtshoorn, "Aardklop" in Potchefstroom, and "Innibos" in Nelspruit.

In addition to dozens of new songs introduced to the Afrikaans music market, modern young artists have become popular for performing old Afrikaans songs on stage or in pubs, with crowds of young admirers singing along. The dramatic increase in the popularity of Afrikaans music can be attributed to several factors. One theory is that the end of Apartheid in 1994 also meant the end of the privileged position that the Afrikaans culture had in South Africa. After losing the State's privileged protection and promotion of the language and culture, the Afrikaans-speaking community appears to have spontaneously begun to embrace and develop their language and culture. This was due to pop artists such as Steve Hofmeyr, Nádine, Kurt Darren, and Nicolis Louw bringing a fresh sound to Afrikaans Music. Many of the songs sung and/or written by these artists are similar in sound to Eurodance. Critics would claim that all an Afrikaans pop artist needs for a song to be popular is a catchy tune and an easy beat. This is due to the massive popularity of a form of couples dancing called "langarm" or "sokkie". The dance halls where this takes place could be considered nightclubs, but they play almost exclusively Afrikaans pop music. The Afrikaans pop music market, therefore, generates tremendous demand for new material.

=== Alternative ===
The 1990s could be seen as the genesis of a vibrant alternative music scene in South Africa. The Voëlvry movement was a major influence in establishing the scene, but the subject matter markedly shifted from protest to more abstract and personal themes. Major festivals such as Oppikoppi and Woodstock were established and grew steadily, firmly cementing a niche among predominantly white university students exploring newfound intellectual independence after the fall of apartheid. The first band to achieve significant recognition was Springbok Nude Girls, established in 1994. Other notable acts established in this decade were Lithium (est. circa 1993), The Outsiders (est. 1991), Nine (est. 1992), Fetish (est. 1996), Wonderboom (est. 1996), Boo! (est. 1997), The Awakening (est. 1996), Henry Ate, Just Jinger (est. 1996), Fuzigish and Battery 9.

=== Metal ===
In the early and mid-1980s, bands included Black Rose, Stretch, Razor, Tyrant, Lynx, Pentagon, Montreaux, Unchained, and Osiris. Then came the new breed of South African metal, exemplified by Ragnärok, South Africa's first thrash metal band, formed by Dean G. Smith, who was labelled South Africa's Metallica and the only metal band at that time to have a cult following. They formed in South Johannesburg in 1986, playing covers briefly before shifting exclusively to original music. Aragorn, later Stryder from Pretoria, and Voice of Destruction from Cape Town, were formed by Greg McEwan in 1986. Through the late 1980s and into the early 1990s, South Africa developed a well-supported metal scene, exemplified by the release of Johannesburg-based Odyssey's self-titled album in 1991. There was a burgeoning crossover punk/metal scene in the major centres, particularly spurred on by Cape Town's Voice of Destruction and Johannesburg-based Urban Assault and Toxic Sox (JHB) in the very late 1980s. Johannesburg developed an extreme metal scene in 1992 with the rise of grindcore/death metal act Sepsis, Retribution Denied, the Boksburg-based macabre/death metal act Debauchery, and the Pretoria doom metal band Funeral, followed by Christian metal acts Abhorrence and Insurrection, Metalmorphosis, Sacrifist, and Agro. The Cape Town metal scene was at its height in the mid-1990s, driven mainly by Voice of Destruction, Raven Wolf, Slayride, and, later, Pothole and Sacraphyx. Voice of Destruction also supported Napalm Death on the SA Tour and was signed to German record Label Morbid Records in 1995, releasing their album "Bloedrivier" that same year and left South Africa to tour with international acts like Krabathor, Cradle of Filth, Behemoth, Hellheim, Opeth, Gomorrah for most of 1995 and In The Woods, Katatonia, on the European Autumn Wilderness Tour in 1996. Pothole released two critically acclaimed albums on South Africa's most successful punk/metal label, Way-Cool Records – their debut, "Force-Fed Hatred", remains the top-selling South African metal album to date. Whilst many of the acts failed to achieve commercial success in terms of CD sales, there was a devoted national following, and local metal bands soon opened the national touring circuit to a greater extent than most other genres. It also attracted international artists to tour the country almost immediately after the demise of apartheid, with some of the most respected having since visited the country.

== 2000s ==
=== Blues Rock ===
The Blues Rock scene has dramatically emerged in South Africa. Albert Frost, Dan Patlansky, The Black Cat Bones, Gerald Clark, Crimson House Blues, The Blues Broers and Boulevard Blues band are some of the most prominent blues acts in South-Africa. Figures like Piet Botha and Valiant Swart have largely contributed to the South-African Blues and Rock scene.

=== Afrikaans ===
In a resurgence (an increase or revival after a period of little activity, popularity, or occurrence) that has been linked by some to freedom from Apartheid guilt, Afrikaans music saw a surge in new artists, album releases, and sales after 2000. In 2004, an Afrikaans album (by balladeer Steve Hofmeyr) was named the best-selling album of the year.

In 2007, an Afrikaans song about Boer War general Koos de la Rey by Bok van Blerk became a hit amid debates on whether it represented a call to arms for the reinstatement of Afrikaner rule or just expressed cultural nostalgia.

While the boom in the Afrikaans pop industry has continued from the previous decade, driven by the popularity of arts festivals and dance halls, other Afrikaans music genres experienced a revival in the new millennium. Rock and alternative Afrikaans music had stagnated somewhat after the heady days of the "Voëlvry" tour and the alternative movement. Signs of a revival can be found in the emergence of Karen Zoid on the music scene, owing to her distinctive alternative sound.

Shortly afterwards, a band of young rockers called "Fokofpolisiekar" became the first group to create alternative rock in Afrikaans. Their controversial name (translated as "Fuckoffpolicecar"), statements, and behavior drew considerable public attention, making them a symbol of the Afrikaans Rock revival movement. Lead singer Francois Van Coke and songwriter Hunter Kennedy have since explored other genres of music that were not previously popular in Afrikaans and have pursued more commercial avenues.

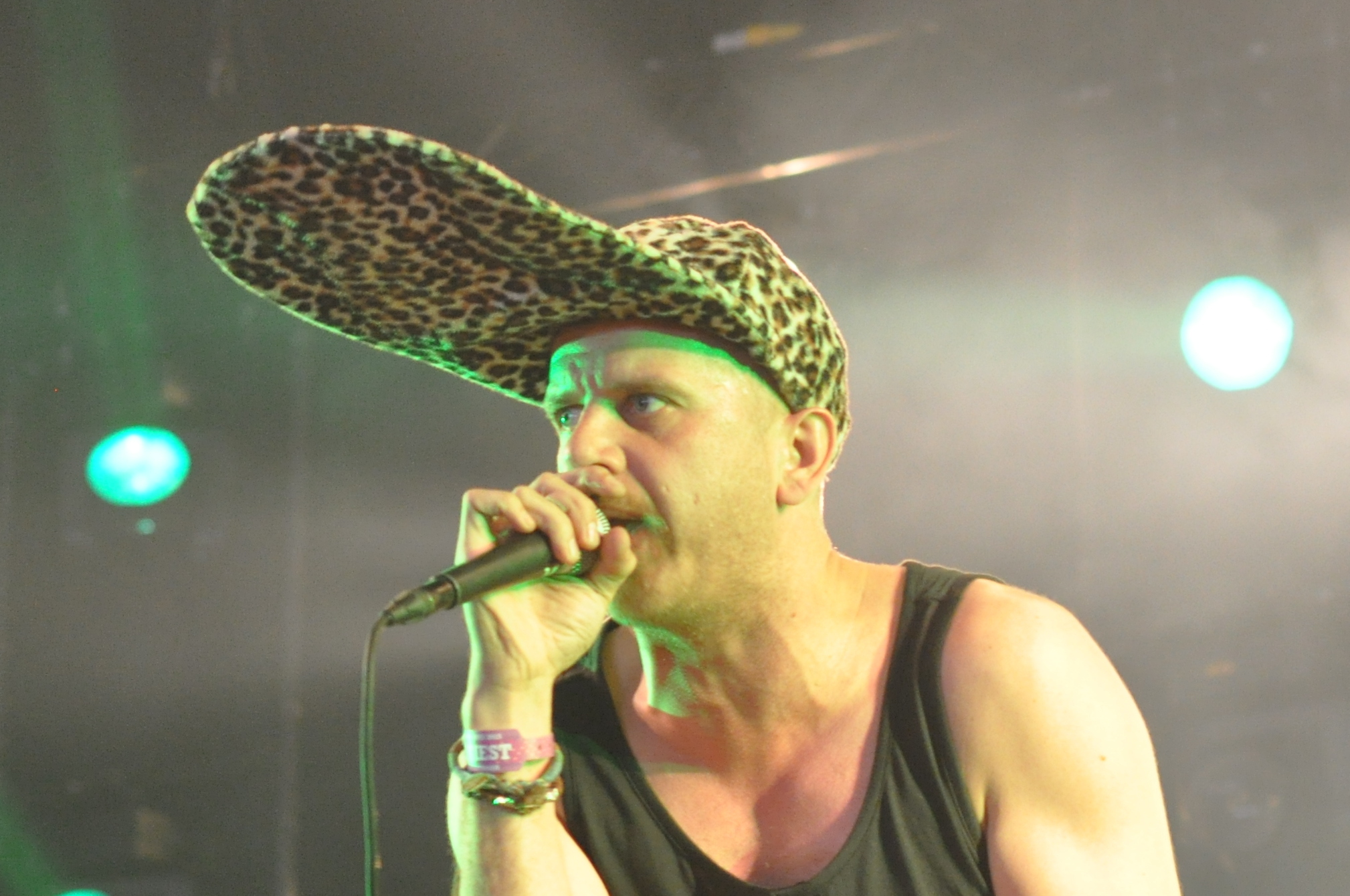
Jack Parow

Shortly after the arrival of this and other rock acts, the first Afrikaans television music channel (MK89) was launched, focusing primarily on rock music. The Afrikaans (and English) rock and alternative music scene has been booming ever since. Bands like Battery9, Terminatrix, NuL, K.O.B.U.S., and Thys Nywerheid continue to reinvent alternative Afrikaans music. In contrast, Jack Parow has continued the Cape's development of Afrikaans rap, building on the work of pioneers Brasse vannie Kaap, finding success as far afield as Holland with his 2009 single "Cooler as Ekke".

=== 2009 Breakthrough Experimentalism ===
In 2009-2010, two distinct and eclectic yet thoroughly South African groups received high acclaim from international music media, and both challenged traditional genre classifications. They significantly increased global recognition of contemporary South African music culture.

BLK JKS' experimental Afro-rock took inspiration from The Mars Volta to blend their Zulu heritage and township origins with modern sounds and equipment and an approach to music-making that seems entirely devoid of boundaries, while maintaining the sweet melodies and rhythmic qualities of South Africa's traditional music. They received an important boost after performing at the Opening Ceremony of the 2010 FIFA World Cup.

Die Antwoord has challenged conventions of hip-hop through its blend of English, Afrikaans, and local slang.

In 2016, singer Refentse Morake made waves for releasing his debut album solely in Afrikaans, becoming the first black singer to do so.

=== Drum and bass ===
The South African drum and bass scene began in the mid-nineties. In 2000, events such as Homegrown became a prominent fixture in Cape Town and a launching platform for international and local artists such as Counterstrike, SFR, Niskerone, Tasha Baxter, Anti Alias and Rudeone. Other regular events include It Came From The Jungle in Cape Town and Science Friksun in Johannesburg.

Hyphen hosts a weekly Sublime drum and bass radio show on Bush Radio.

=== Psychedelic trance ===
South African psytrance is a form of darker psychedelic trance music that started and is produced chiefly in South Africa. Unlike the Russian dark psytrance, South African psytrance is more rhythmic, melodic, and danceable, yet keeps the 'nasty-like' attitude. Notable record labels include Timecode Records, Mind Manipulation Device, and Nano Records.

== Modern day ==
The South African music scene has continued to flourish in the 2000s. The decade has seen the rise of Xhosa singer Simphiwe Dana, who has been hailed as the "new Miriam Makeba" for her unique combination of jazz, pop, and traditional music. Another young singer is Thandiswa Mazwai, formerly a member of Bongo Maffin. Thandiswa combined local hip-hop rhythms with traditional Xhosa sounds, creating a rich, textured style. 2006 saw the rise of Shwi Nomtekhala, a duo combining mbaqanga rhythms and maskandi sounds. The duo has become one of the most influential new acts on the music scene today, outselling even kwaito artists. Their third album Wangisiza Baba was a major hit in the country. Cape Town–based female artist Verity has been recognised internationally for innovation in the music industry for selling 2000 copies of her album Journey before it was actually recorded. The rap group "2 and a Half Secondz" has gained recognition in the Cape Town suburb of Delft since 2009. Cape Town-based band Crimson House Blues has made waves throughout the live circuit, being hailed as one of the greatest live acts in the country. In addition, Willim Welsyn, a member of the Afrikaans rock band Willim Welsyn en Sunrise Toffies, was nominated for and won multiple awards in the Afrikaans Alternative categories.

Nianell, the South African superstar, is also an internationally recognised artist in modern South African music, combining Folk, Classical, Pop, Country, and Celtic music to create her unique sound. She has released seven albums, featuring songs that alternate between Afrikaans and English. Her first platinum hit, which sold more than 2 million copies, was "Who Painted The Moon," which was also covered by international superstar Hayley Westenra. In early 2011, she made her U.S. debut with her compilation album Who Painted The Moon.

Ladysmith Black Mambazo remain one of the world's most popular choral groups and continue to be popular in South Africa, with their latest offering being the highly praised Ilembe (2007/2008). The renowned group has three Grammy Awards. The Mahotella Queens also remain high-selling, and – with the death of long-time groaner Mahlathini in 1999 – have recorded several new albums, including their 2007 release Siyadumisa (Songs of Praise). 2008 has also seen the return of a former singer with the Mahotella Queens, Irene Mawela. Mawela appeared on thousands of mbaqanga and mgqashiyo recording sessions throughout the 1960s and the 1970s, recording mainly for Gallo Record Company, often as part of the line-ups of the Mahotella Queens, the Mgababa Queens, Izintombi Zomgqashiyo, and also under her own name (though sometimes as Irene & The Sweet Melodians, or Irene & The Zebra Queens). In 1983, she left the company to record as a solo artist, with a successful Venda-traditional release Khanani Yanga. Mawela left the music business in the late 1980s but returned in November 2007 with a new album titled Tlhokomela Sera, which combines contemporary sounds with pure gospel music, creating what Mawela calls "gospel jive".

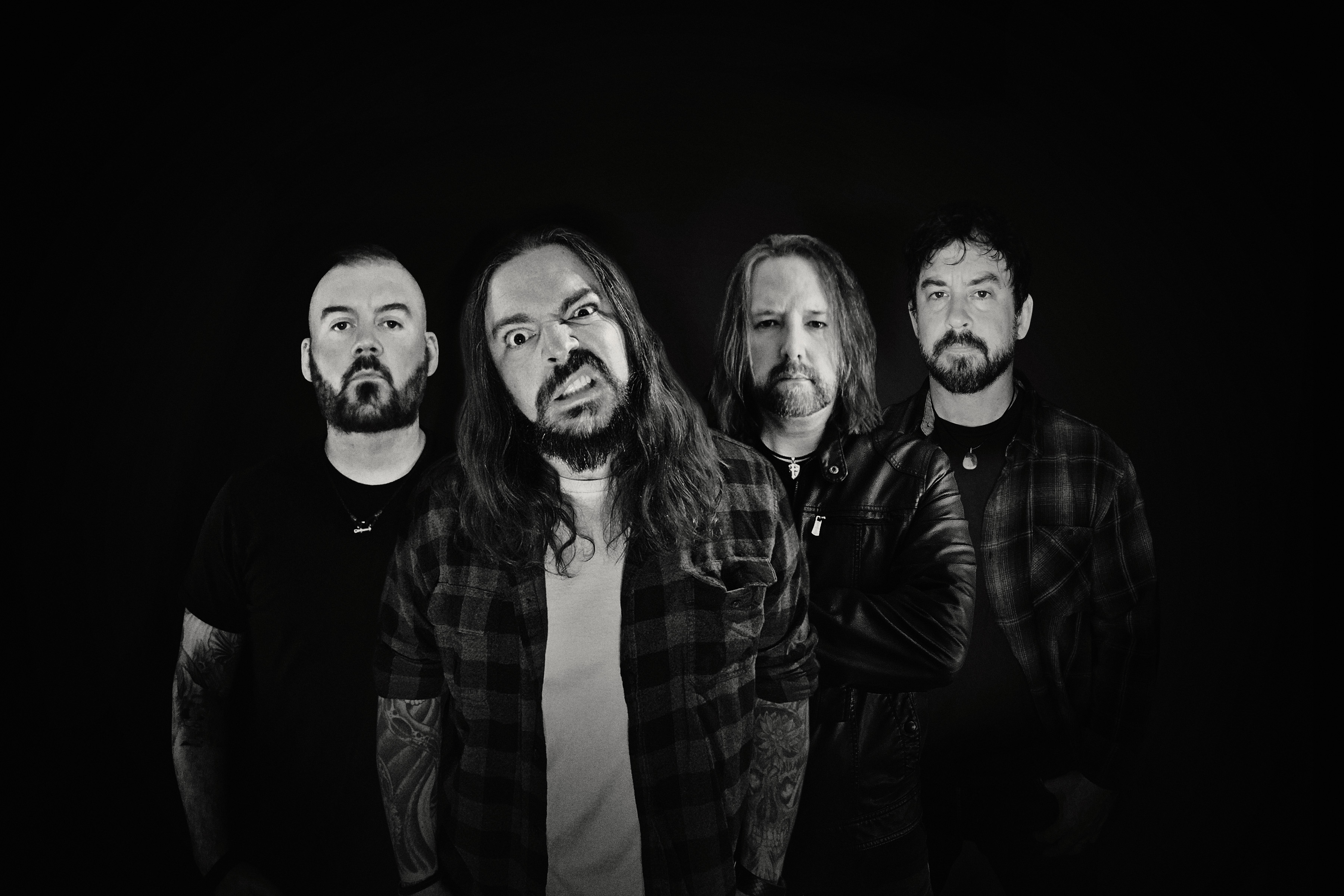
Rock band Seether

The music scene in South Africa is centered on four major cities: Johannesburg, Cape Town, Durban, and Bloemfontein. One of the characteristics of the scene is a strong sense of community, with artists, promoters, and venues actively involved in developing local talent. Bloemfontein's music focus is centred predominantly on metal and Afrikaans genres. Johannesburg, Cape Town, and Durban are far more wide-ranging in the genres of music covered by bands and artists. Cape Town is a hub of the underground music scene, generally regarded as more experimental than that produced in other centres. Potchefstroom appears to be the latest development ground for Afrikaans rock music, with various bands such as Straatligkinders making their start here.

The introduction of the South African Music Awards (SAMA), intended to recognise accomplishment in the South African recording industry, has raised the awareness of local artists and bands. The awards are given in various categories, including album of the year, best newcomer, best artist (male and female), and best duo or group. South African Music Award winners include Karen Zoid, Freshlyground, Tasha Baxter and Seether.

Aside from uniquely African music, the South African music scene has, to a large extent, been characterised by bands seeking to emulate popular genres abroad. However, in recent years, South African music has begun to develop a truly original sound.

South Africa has several annual music festivals including Woodstock South Africa, MotherFudd, Oppikoppi, Rocking the Daisies and Splashy Fen. The music festivals cater to different genres and styles of music. Motherfudd is an exclusively metal festival held early in the year. The 2008 Motherfudd festival featured a lineup of 30 bands across 2 stages and took place near Hartebeespoort. The Oppikoppi festival started in 1994 and is held in Limpopo, near the mining town of Northam. Originally a rock festival, Oppikoppi has expanded to include other genres. Splashy Fen is an annual Easter festival held on a farm near Underberg in KwaZulu-Natal, with a focus on rock and reggae music. Since 2016, The Legend stage at Splashy, convened by Don Clarke and Dicky Roberts, has brought well-known local legends back to the festival, including P J Powers in 2019. Rocking the Daisies is an annual music festival held in Darling, outside Cape Town, on the Cloof Wine Estate. It was established in 2005 with a focus on rock music and is a "green" festival that has garnered awards.

Skouspel is a very popular televised annual concert sponsored by the Afrikaans family-magazine Huisgenoot, hosted at the Sun City resort. Skouspel (translating to "spectacle") focuses primarily on Afrikaans music and regularly features some of the biggest names in the Afrikaans music scene, along with new artists.

Although the local music scene has continued to grow exponentially since the 2000s, in 2016, a substantial amount of South Africans still consumed foreign music content, opposed to local content.

== South African house and electronic dance music ==
=== Kwaito ===
Kwaito, a music genre that originated in Soweto, Johannesburg, in the 1980s and went mainstream in the 1990s, is a variation of house music characterised by the incorporation of African sounds and samples. Unlike other styles of house music, Kwaito songs typically have a slower tempo and feature catchy melodic and percussive loop samples, along with deep bass lines and vocals. Although it shares similarities with hip-hop, kwaito has its own approach to vocal delivery, blending singing, rapping, and shouting.

=== Deep house ===
South African deep house is commonly referred to as SA deep house or Deep SA. Johannesburg and Pretoria are unofficially acknowledged as the focal points of South Africa's deep house culture. Prominent figures in South African deep house include Vinny Da Vinci, DJ Christos, Glen Lewis, DJ Fresh, Lady Lea, Bob Mabena, Fistaz Mixwell, Jazzuelle, Lazarusman, Kat La Kat, Donald, House Victimz, Sishisoul, Jullian Gomes, Liquideep and Chymamusique. In 2014, Vinny Da Vinci released his 10th and as per stipulated final deep house album via the record label, House Afrika.

=== Afro house ===
Afro house emerged in the 1990s, although its roots may have been established in the late 1980s, influenced by the prevalence of kwaito, mbaqanga, and house music locally and internationally. Unfortunately, this period coincided with the apartheid regime, making it challenging to document and disseminate information. Notably, kwaito-associated artists such as Brenda Fassie and Sipho Mabuse gained international recognition, with hits on global charts such as KISS-FM and Capitol Radio, thereby providing the world's initial exposure to South African house music. During the era, musicians such as Vinny Da Vinci, DJ Christos, and the Revolution twins were actively involved in hosting parties and DJing at various locations.

=== Techno ===
The first South African live techno band was Kraftreaktor. Amoraim and Gareth Hinde are from Kraftreaktor and have performed at several raves, playing primarily techno-trance music, occasionally featuring guest musicians. Their own work influenced their music but also featured a distinctive South African touch. They sometimes integrated African sounds and ethnomusicologist, Gavin Coppenhall.

=== Shangaan electro ===
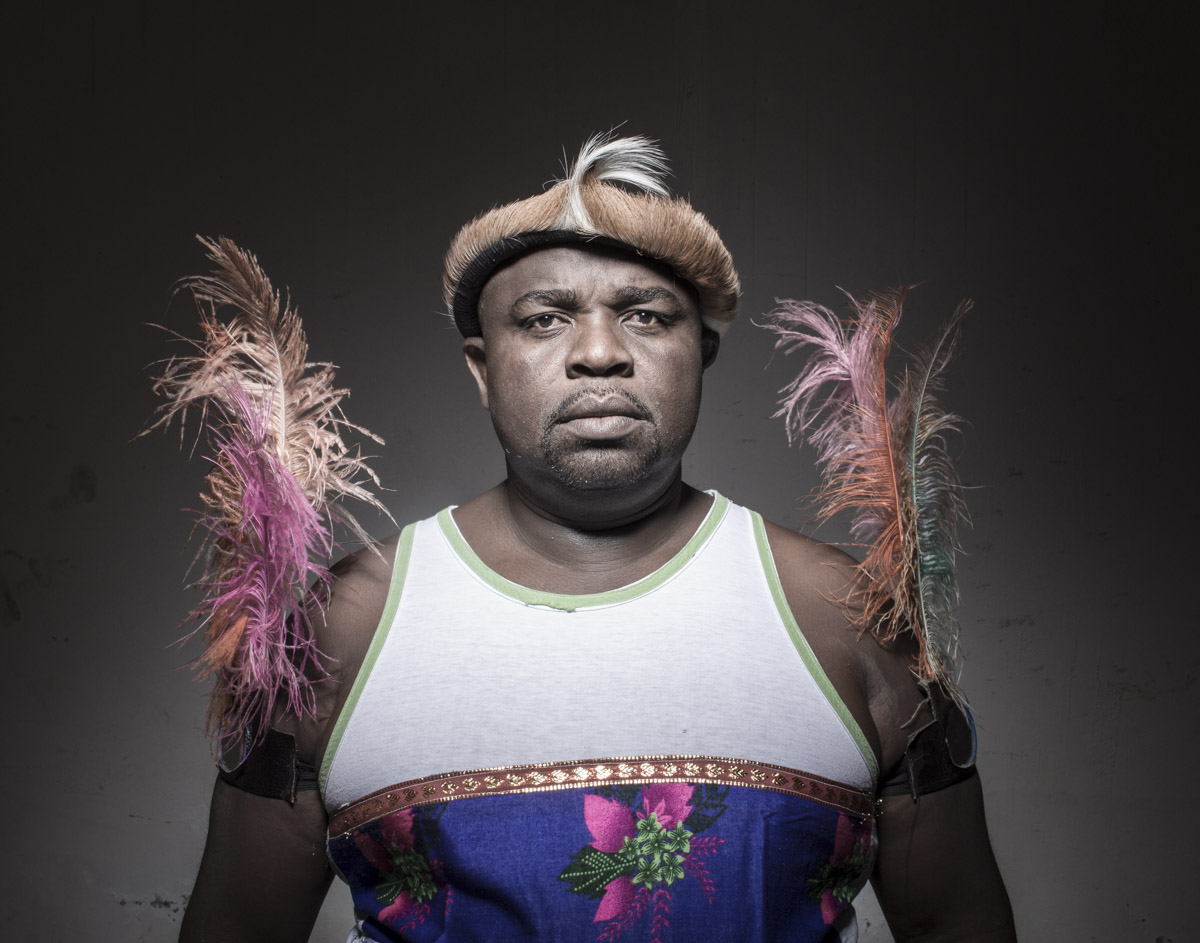
Nozinja

Shangaan electro, also referred to as Tsonga electro, is a dance movement and musical style that originated from a contemporary interpretation of local folk traditions in South African townships. The genre incorporates elements from Tsonga disco and kwaito. Spearheaded by DJ Khwaya and producer Nozinja, it developed into a recognised "Afro-futurist" genre of electronic dance music.

=== Bacardi house ===
During the 2000s, a group of producers including DJ Spoko, DJ Mujava, House Station, Mzo Bullet, and others spearheaded Bacardi House, commonly known as "sgubhu saPitori", which featured popular tracks like "Township Funk", "Tobetsa", "Casablanca", and "Mugwanti". Bacardi House combines percussive elements with pop-synth melodies.

Vusi Ma R5, born Itumeleng Mosoeu, is another Bacardi pioneer known for hits such as "Tse Nyane" and "Thaba (Ke Chanchitse). He is honorifically known as the King of Bacardi.

=== Bolobedu house ===
Bolobedu house, also known as bolo house, combines Afro-house instrumentals with Bolobedu melodies typically sung using high-pitched auto-tune. The term "bolo house" is derived from the Balobedu, an ethnic group hailing from the Limpopo province. Like this ethnic group, the origins of bolo house can be traced to the late 2000s. Many early bolo house tracks gained regional popularity, such as DJ Rakzen's "Phindi". However, it was not until the release of DJ Call Me's album Marry Me Season 1 around 2008 that the subgenre gained national recognition. Bolo house draws inspiration from the sound pioneered by record producer Bojo Mujo, who was born in Limpopo and raised in Gauteng, particularly Pretoria. He rose to prominence in the 2000s with anthemic releases like "Shiwelele" and "Summer Rain". Notable songs include King Monada’s "Malwedhe" and Master KG and Nomcebo Zikode's "Jerusalema".

=== Gqom ===
Gqom, sometimes referred to as "3-step" (a subgenre of gqom), emerged in the early 2010s in Durban. It was pioneered by music producers Naked Boyz, Sbucardo, DJ Lag, Rudeboyz, Nasty Boyz, Griffit Vigo, Distruction Boyz, Menzi Shabane, and Citizen Boy. The genre is characterized by minimal, raw, and repetitive beats with heavy bass, often incorporating elements of techno, resulting in a dark, hypnotic club sound. Unlike other house music styles, gqom does not typically use the four-on-the-floor rhythm pattern. The genre was developed by a young generation of technologically skilled DJs who produced music in a DIY fashion, using software such as FL Studio. Gqom and afrotech record producers often blend the two genres.

Other notable gqom artists are inclusive of Babes Wodumo, Busiswa, DJ Tira, Moonchild Sanelly and Okmalumkoolkat.

FAKA's music from the duo's Amaqhawe EP was selected by Donatella Versace for the Versace Spring 2019 Menswear Collection fashion show.

In 2018, the South Korean boy band BTS released "Idol" from their Love Yourself: Answer album, which drew inspiration from and incorporated gqom rhythmic elements. The band additionally promoted an alternative digital-only version of the song featuring Trinidadian-American rapper and singer Nicki Minaj.

=== Lekompo ===
The precise origins of lekompo's foundational sound remain a subject of debate. However, there are recognizable elements evocative of various music genres linked to Limpopo. Notable artists include Shebeshxt, Shandesh, Makhadzi, Kharishma, Poobington, PLG Chanty, Janesh, Hitboss SA, Tsaka RSA, Dolly Ditebogo and Ba Bethe Gashoazen.

=== Amapiano ===
Amapiano is a subgenre of house and kwaito music, thought to have emerged in the mid-2010s. The genre combines deep house, jazz, and lounge music. Amapiano is distinguished by high-pitched piano melodies reminiscent of kwaito, South African basslines, and a slower tempo. Additionally, it integrates rhythms from 1990s South African house music and percussion elements from gqom. Central to the genre, is the usage of the slit drum (log drum) popularized by record producer MDU aka TRP.

Other notable amapiano artists include MFR Souls, Kabza de Small, DJ Maphorisa, Mpura, Kamo Mphela, Tyla, Major League DJz, Uncle Waffles, Kelvin Momo and DBN Gogo.

Smash hit, "Monalisa" by Nigerian singer-songwriter Lojay and Nigerian record producer Sarz featuring American musician Chris Brown incorporated percussive elements typical of amapiano music.

== South African hip-hop ==
In South Africa, the hip-hop scene intersects with kwaito, a music genre that highlights African culture and societal concerns. Rappers like Pope Troy utilised socio-economic issues affecting South Africa's political landscape and hip-hop culture, employing a linguistic approach to engage the masses in discussions about the technical factors contributing to the problems.

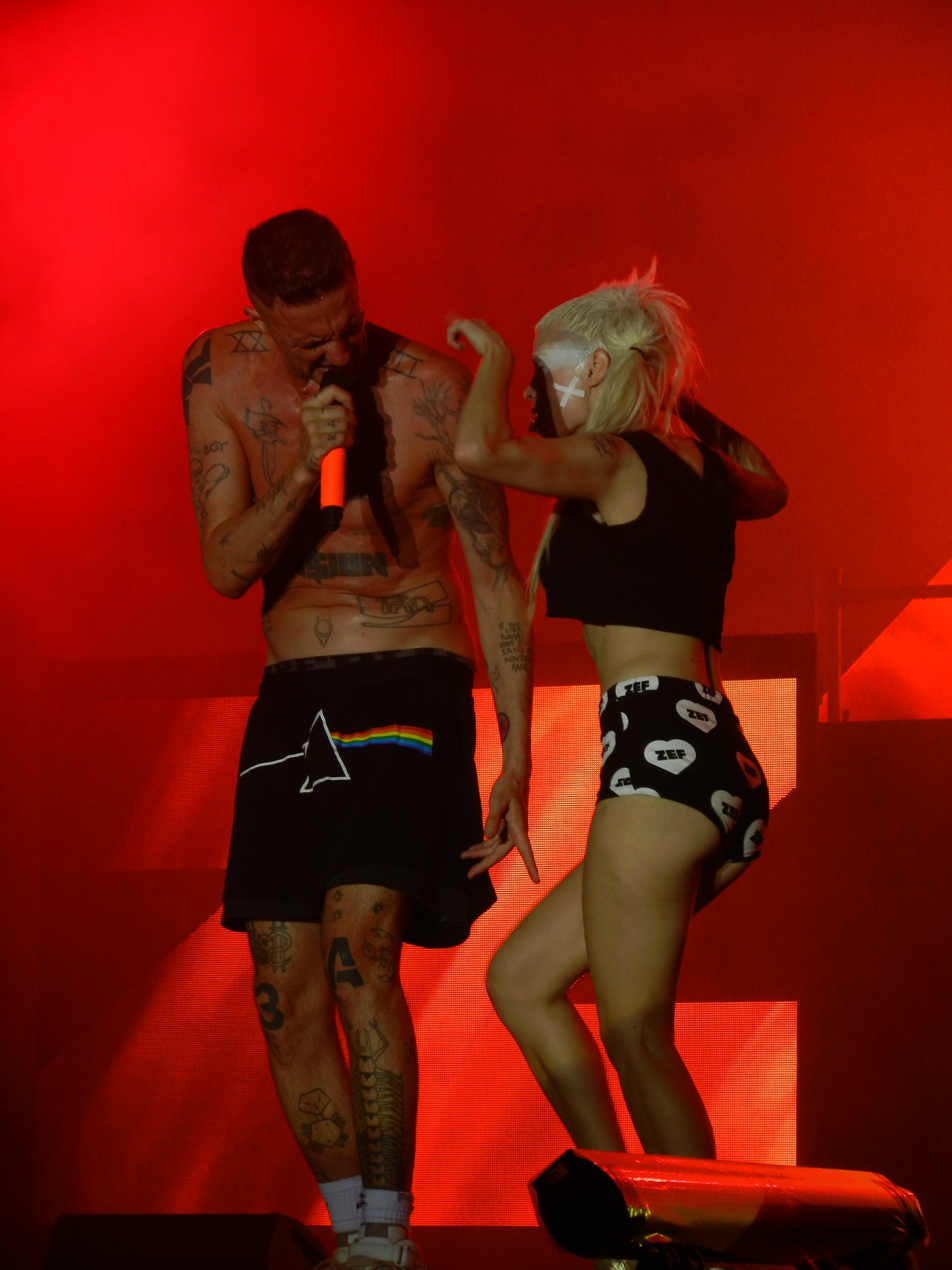
Die Antwoord

South African hip-hop has emerged as a significant force in the country's mainstream music scene. From its roots as a form of political expression in Cape Town during the 1990s to the emergence of artists like HHP, AKA and Riky Rick, it has evolved over the decades. Notable South African hip-hop musicians include Tuks Senganga, Cassper Nyovest, Nasty C, Kwesta, Khuli Chana, iFani, Mo'Molemi, Da L.E.S, Sjava, K.O, Frank Casino, Okmalumkoolkat, Fifi Cooper, Anatii, Emtee, Shane Eagle, YoungstaCPT, A-Reece, Costa Titch and Big Zulu.

Die Antwoord, an alternative hip-hop group, achieved global mainstream success. Reflecting the new 'Zef' counter-culture in its "cheap-and-dirty values". The band achieved worldwide attention with their self-published debut album, thanks to two striking and humorous YouTube music videos released in 2010 that rapidly went viral. The highly polarised international response to their music helped them secure an album deal with Cherrytree Records, an imprint of Interscope. They also famously triggered a feud with American pop singer Lady Gaga, who offered them the chance to open for her on her Born This Way Tour, which they blatantly refused.

=== Motswako ===
Motswako, a subgenre of hip-hop, emerged in the 1990s, originating in South Africa and widely popularized in Botswana. The genre is characterized by laid-back rap delivery and a consistent beat. It often incorporates reggae-influenced Afro-centric or drum and bass beats, occasionally employing a four-on-the-floor rhythm. Minimalistic electronic elements provide a backdrop for the rap vocals to shine. In its early stages, Motswako featured predominantly Setswana rap lyrics, alongside American vernacular, with other South African languages such as Zulu, Xhosa, and Afrikaans also incorporated. The lyrical themes range from spoken-word poetry to localized socio-political or economic commentary, drug culture, unity, pride in local culture, romance, the objectification of women, the pursuit of wealth, aspirations, and celebration. Key figures of motswako include Stoane Seate, Hip Hop Pantsula (HHP), Cassper Nyovest, Tuks Senganga, Mo'Molemi, Khuli Chana and Spoek Mathambo.

=== Kasi rap ===
Kasi rap predominantly uses isiZulu and isiXhosa and focuses on themes such as adversity, family, and aspirations for a better life. Pro (formerly Pro Kid) was a central figure in the genre, and his album "Heads And Tails" (2005), released under TS Records, solidified his role as its leading voice. In the Western and Eastern Cape, kasi rap transformed into spaza (meaning "tuckshop"), sharing similar thematic explorations. Driemanskap stood out as one of the prominent groups in this movement, alongside other noteworthy artists like Maxhoseni, Kanyi, Red Button, Manelisi, and Deep Soweto.

=== Muthaland Crunk ===
In 2008, the group Jozi (comprising Da L.E.S, Bongani Fassie, Crazy Lu, and Ishmael) blended maskandi with trap in their debut album Muthaland Crunk, catapulting them to superstardom. However, the subgenre "muthaland crunk" faded alongside the decline of crunk.

=== African trap music (ATM) ===
African trap music, commonly referred to as ATM, is a subgenre of trap which emerged in 2015. The song that's said to have initiated the genre was "Roll Up" Emtee's breakthrough hit single, which was released in the same year, citing lyrics, "krapa fasa, baba, let's start rolling up the jets". The genre was spearheaded by musicians Emtee, Sjava, and Saudi. Other significant contributors include Sims, Ranks, Just G, and record producer Ruff. African trap music is defined by its trap production infused with South African influences. In terms of lyrics, it often features storytelling and relatable themes (Black stories of love, survival, success, and family politics, among others), and melodies that draw inspiration from South African genres such as Afropop, maskandi, kwaito, and mbhaqanga. In contrast to the prevalent use of auto-tune in trap music vocals, Saudi, Sjava, and Emtee rarely used the popular software. Additionally, most of the lyrics are sung in South African languages, predominantly isiZulu. The songs "X" and "Seasons" by Saudi and Sjava were featured on the Billboard charts through their contributions to the Black Panther soundtrack. Additionally, both Emtee and Sjava's debut albums, Avery and Isina Muva, achieved gold status in South Africa.

=== Gqom trap ===
Gqom trap, which blends elements of gqom and trap music, originated in the 2010s and was developed and introduced by the Durban hip-hop collective Witness The Funk.

== See also ==
- List of South African musicians
- List of Afrikaans singers
- List of radio stations in South Africa
- Music of Namibia
- Recording Industry of South Africa
- South African Music Awards
- Music in the movement against apartheid
- Botswana

== Bibliography ==
- Allingham, Rob. "Nation of Voice". 2000. In Broughton, Simon and Ellingham, Mark with McConnachie, James and Duane, Orla (Ed.), World Music, Vol. 1: Africa, Europe and the Middle East, pp. 638–657. Rough Guides Ltd, Penguin Books. ISBN 1-85828-636-0
- Mthembu-Salter, Gregory. "Spirit of Africa". 2000. In Broughton, Simon and Ellingham, Mark with McConnachie, James and Duane, Orla (Ed.), World Music, Vol. 1: Africa, Europe and the Middle East, pp. 658–659. Rough Guides Ltd, Penguin Books. ISBN 1-85828-636-0
- Allingham, Rob. "Hip Kings, Hip Queens". 2000. In Broughton, Simon and Ellingham, Mark with McConnachie, James and Duane, Orla (Ed.), World Music, Vol. 1: Africa, Europe and the Middle East, pp. 660–668. Rough Guides Ltd, Penguin Books. ISBN 1-85828-636-0
