= Charles Segal =

Charles Segal may refer to:

- Charles Segal (classicist) (died 2002), American classicist
- Charles Segal (pianist), jazz musician
