= McCully Workshop Inc. =

Studio album by McCully Workshop
- Released: June 1970
- Recorded: South Africa
- Genres: Psychedelic rock, blues rock, hard rock
- Language: English
- Label: Trutone
- Producer: Billy Forrest

McCully Workshop chronology
McCully Workshop Inc. (1970)	Genesis (1971)

Singles from McCully Workshop Inc.
- 1. "Why Can't It Rain / Hardcase Woman" Released: 1970

McCully Workshop Inc. is the debut album of South African psychedelic rock band McCully Workshop. The album was produced by Billy Forrest on the Trutone Records label who had joined Trutone as record producer in 1968. Trutone had recently been acquired, in 1967, by Gallo (Africa) Limited. Gallo went on to become one of the internationally recognized giants in the music world. The album draws on a number of musical styles and is influenced by the likes of; The Beatles in particular 'Sgt Pepper', Frank Zappa, Pink Floyd, and the Moody Blues 'Threshold Of A Dream'.

== Artwork ==
The front cover photograph was taken by Sigurd Olivier and features a cat named 'Sirikit'. The graffiti on the wall was drawn by the McCullagh brothers father. The band photographs on the back cover were taken by Humphrey Clinker.

== Track listing ==
Side one
No.	Title	Writer(s)	Length
1.	"Why Can't It Rain"	Tully McCully	4:12
2.	"Hardcase Woman"		2:34
3.	"Ice Lover"		3:05
4.	"Four Walls"		2:40
5.	"Stargazer"		2:48
6.	"Rush Hour At Midnight"		3:42

Side two
No.	Title	Length
1.	"Jackin' Around"	2.04
2.	"Head For The Moon"	4:00
3.	"The Circus"	4:00
4.	"Years Of My Life"	3:19
5.	"Fast Car"	3:41
6.	"Séance"	3:05

== Chart positions ==
Singles

Year	Single	Chart	Position
1970	"Why Can't It Rain"	Springbok Radio charts	12
1970	"Why Can't It Rain"	LM Radio charts	13

== Personnel ==
McCully Workshop

- Tully McCully (née McCullagh) – vocals, bass, guitar
- Mike McCully (née McCullagh) – vocals, drums
- Richard Hyam – rhythm and acoustic guitars, vocals
- Glenda Wassman – organ, vocals
- Ian Smith – trumpet, flute, flugelhorn

Additional personnel

- Allan Faull – lead guitar on 'Why Can't It Rain', 'The Circus', 'Hardcase Woman' and 'Stargazer'
- Alan van der Merwe – vocal harmony and organ on 'Why Can't It Rain' and 'Stargazer'
- Melanie Hyam – vocal harmonies on 'Why Can't It Rain' and 'Rush Hour At Midnight'

Production

- Billy Forrest

== See also ==
Music of South Africa
