= MoShang =

Jean Marais
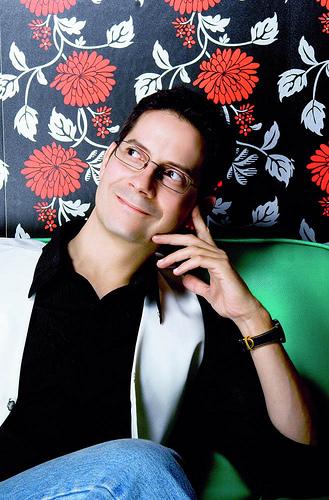
- MoShang

Background information
- Origin: Bellville, Western Cape, South Africa
- Genres: Downtempo, chill-out music
- Occupation: Musician / music producer
- Instruments: saxophone, wind controller
- Years active: 2004–2012
- Labels: Onse Plate, Lemongrassmusic
- Website: moshang.net

Jean Marais, also known as MoShang, is a South African downtempo musician and music producer. He is referred to as the Sound Jeweler and has been living in Taiwan since 2003.

== Early life and musical background ==
Jean Marais began as a choral singer in the early 1980s in Cape Town, South Africa – at which time he acquired his first computer, a VIC-20. It would take some time, however, for his love of music and computers to find its ideal expression. Marais first earned acclaim as lead singer/frontman of the South African art-rock band Duusman and as saxophonist for the group Tsunami; he also served as producer on three award-winning albums honoring poet Breyten Breytenbach and formed half of the Afrikaans pop duo 12 Hz with Riku Lätti. He garnered South Africa's prestigious Avanti Craft award for his score to the short film "Angels in a Cage."

Marais relocated to the Taiwanese city of Taichung in 2003; his first release as MoShang, Made in Taiwan, was released on his Onse Plate (Afrikaans for "Our Records") imprint in 2004. His second, Chill Dynasty, followed in 2006. His music was selected for the Discovery HD production "Fantastic Festivals of the World". In 2009, he was selected as the winner in the audio category of the Ubuntu 9.04 Free Culture Showcase and his song "Invocation" was distributed with that version of the OS. In 2009 he teamed up (as Jean Marais) with Andre van Rensburg and Louis Minnaar and released the project/album 'Eentonig'.

== 2010 to present ==
MoShang released his fifth full-length album "Further East" on Lemongrassmusic label (2010). He has released more than 100 episodes of his Live Online podcast – each episode is an hour-long recording of a live performance of his original music and is released under a Creative Commons license. MoShang recently completed the original score for the National Geographic Channel (Asia) documentary "Koxinga: A Hero's Legacy".

== Discography ==
- Made in Taiwan (2004 Onse Plate)
- Chill Dynasty (2006 Onse Plate)
- Asian Variations: Various Artists Remixed by MoShang (2007 Onse Plate)
- Stone Bell EP (2008 Onse Plate)
- Suncake Lounge Vol. 1 (2009 Onse Plate)
- Further East (2010 Lemongrassmusic)
- Groove Suite (2011 Onse Plate)
- What Comes Around (2012 Stone Bell Music)

=== Various artist compilations ===
- The Chillcast with Anji Bee: 5 Years of Chillin' (2011 Chillcuts)
- Lounge du soleil Vol.11 (2011 Lemongrassmusic)
- Buddha Grooves 6 (2011 Ayia Napa)
- Luxury Lounge Cafe, Vol. 4 (Audio Lotion Recordings 2010)
- Body Art 2 (2010 Tiger Grass)
- Smooth & Relaxed Vol. 3 (2010 Wax N Soul)
- Tokyo Chillout (2010 Lemongrassmusic)
- Deep House Dreams 4 (2010 Lemongrassmusic)
- Lemongrass Garden Vol.5 (2010 Lemongrassmusic)
- Buddha Grooves Vol. 4 (2010 Audio Lotion)
- Lounge du soleil Vol.9 (2010 Lemongrassmusic)
- Lemongrassmusic in the mix: Ethnosphere 2 (2010 Lemongrassmusic)
- Big In Japan – Japanese Chillin' (2010 Wax N Soul)
- eentonig (2009 Onse Plate, South of the Border)
- Beste Breyten (2009 Rhythm records)
- Future Jazz Cafe (2009 Lemongrassmusic)
- Lounge du soleil Vol.8 (2009 Lemongrassmusic)
- Lemongrass Garden (2009 Lemongrassmusic)
- So Pure Remixes (2009 Lemongrassmusic)
- Buddha Grooves 5 (2009 Ayia Napa)
- Kou Chou Ching Presents: Unsung Heroes (2009 KCC Music)
- Exodus (2009 Uloud Music)
- The Cinematic Sessions: Shanghai (2009 House Music Records)
- Chillin' in the nude (2009 Lemongrassmusic)
