= Andre van Rensburg =

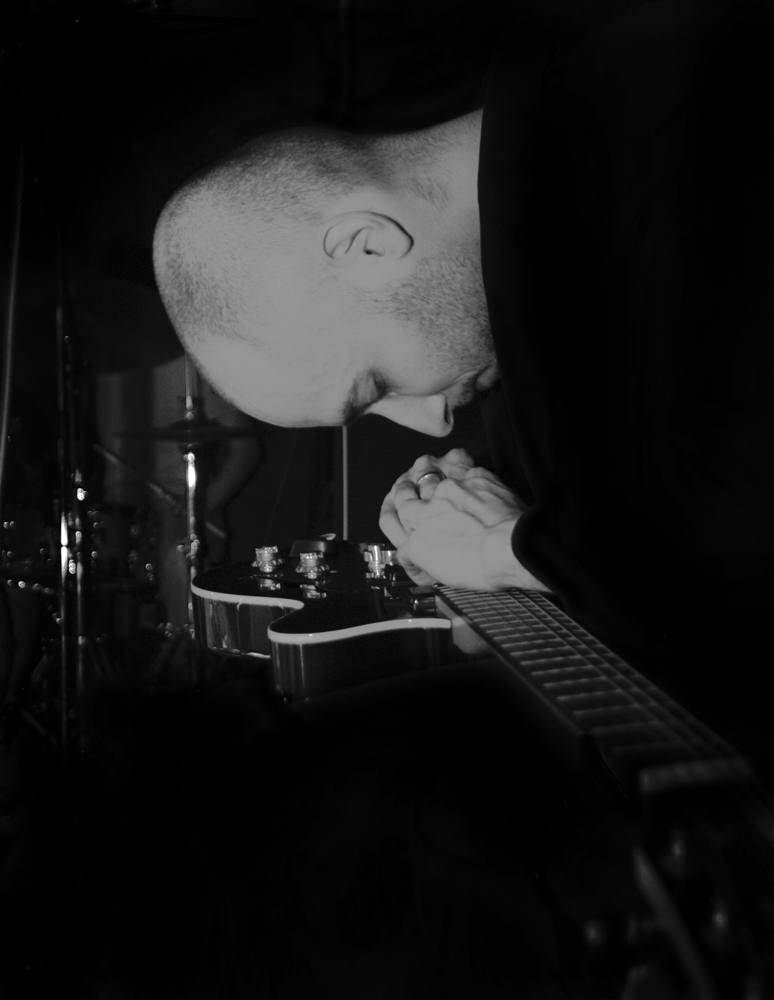
- Andre van Rensburg

Background information
- Origin: Paarl, South Africa
- Genres: Experimental, avant-garde
- Occupation: Musician / composer / producer
- Instrument: Guitar
- Years active: 1997 – present
- Label: South of the border
- Formerly of: Battery 9 Ohm
- Website: www.andrevanrensburg.photo

Andre van Rensburg (born 22 December 1976 in Cape Town) is a South African avant-garde composer, producer and instrumentalist living in Tokyo, Japan. Van Rensburg is a prolific artist with dozens of credits as composer, performer and producer.

== Career ==
He established himself in South Africa in the mid '90s and has since traveled the world, performing and recording regularly in Taiwan, Japan and New York City. He is known in South Africa as the founder of the group Supernature as well as the guitarist for the hugely successful industrial group Battery 9 from 1999 to 2004. His solo instrumental work is characterized by dissonance, non-predictable structures and the absence of traditional melodic or harmonic content. His solo guitar playing often utilizes extended techniques and string 'preparations', as in the prepared piano works of composer John Cage. He has been influenced by composers such as Morton Feldman, Giacinto Scelsi, Leo Brouwer, John Zorn and Pierre Boulez, and improvisors Derek Bailey, Fred Frith and Marc Ribot.

== Early life ==
Andre van Rensburg grew up in South Africa and studied classical guitar from the age of 7. He started composing at the age of 10. After studying with various teachers he developed his own notational technique, blending traditional musical notation with abstract and graphic notation. In 1994 he moved to London and Paris, busking for a living. In 1995 he returned to South Africa, forming the group Supernature, who had a number one hit on Barney Simon's 5FM Alternative Chart with their first single "Devil" (1997).

Supernature went on to record two albums. He then joined Brendan Jury and Warrick Sony's Trans.sky project as guitarist, later forming the group Ohm with Jury. Ohm went on to release an album through the British label M.E.L.T. 2000 and touring England and the Netherlands in 2000. In 1998 he moved to Johannesburg and joined the industrial group Battery 9, appearing on their album Sondebok, released by BMG in 1999. He also composed and recorded an album with Battery 9 front man Paul Riekert as Die Menere; the album Floukop was released by One F Music in 2004.

== Recent projects ==
Van Rensburg moved to Asia in 2003, forming the recording label South of the Border, and released five solo albums: Concrete (2007), chamber music performed by the Poisondwarf Ensemble; Unfinished Cities (2008), recorded in Japan and Taiwan with koto player Mori Chieko; Scopophilia (7 etudes for solo bondage guitar) (2008); Kopstukke Vol. 1 (the first in a series of nine albums of new compositions for classical guitar, 2011); and Game of the Voce (2011). In 2009 he collaborated with South African expats Louis Minnaar and Jean Marais (also known as MoShang) and released the album Eentonig through the Onse Plate label. He has recently scored music for award-winning Thai film director Pramotz Sangsorn and creates various sound installations internationally. In 2016 he relocated to Tokyo where he performs with various butoh dancers and other improvising musicians, including Tetuzi Akiyama. In 2022 he produced and released the album 翠靄 (Suiai) with Ko Ishikawa on shō (a traditional Japanese instrument usually associated with its use in gagaku music) and Naoto Yamagishi on percussion.

== Discography ==
- Supernature – Sugar in a Hurricane (1998)
- Supernature – Spill (1999)
- Ohm – Ohm (2000) M.E.L.T. 2000
- Ohm – 2nd (2001)
- Poisondwarf – Clinical Capsule (2001)
- Battery 9 – Sondebok – "Iets om te blameer"(2003) BMG
- Die Menere – Floukop (2004) One F
- Eentonig – Eentonig (2009)
- André van Rensburg – Concrete (2007) South of the Border
- André van Rensburg – Unfinished Cities (2008) South of the Border
- André van Rensburg – Scopophilia (2008) South of the Border
- André van Rensburg – Kopstukke Vol. 1 (2011) South of the Border
- André van Rensburg – Game of the Voice (2011) South of the Border
- Duo Sovtio - Prima Matera (2015) South of the Border
- André van Rensburg – Trepenation (2016) South of the Border
- André van Rensburg, Ko Ishikawa, Naoto Yamagishi - Suiai (2022) South of the Border
