= Battery 9 =

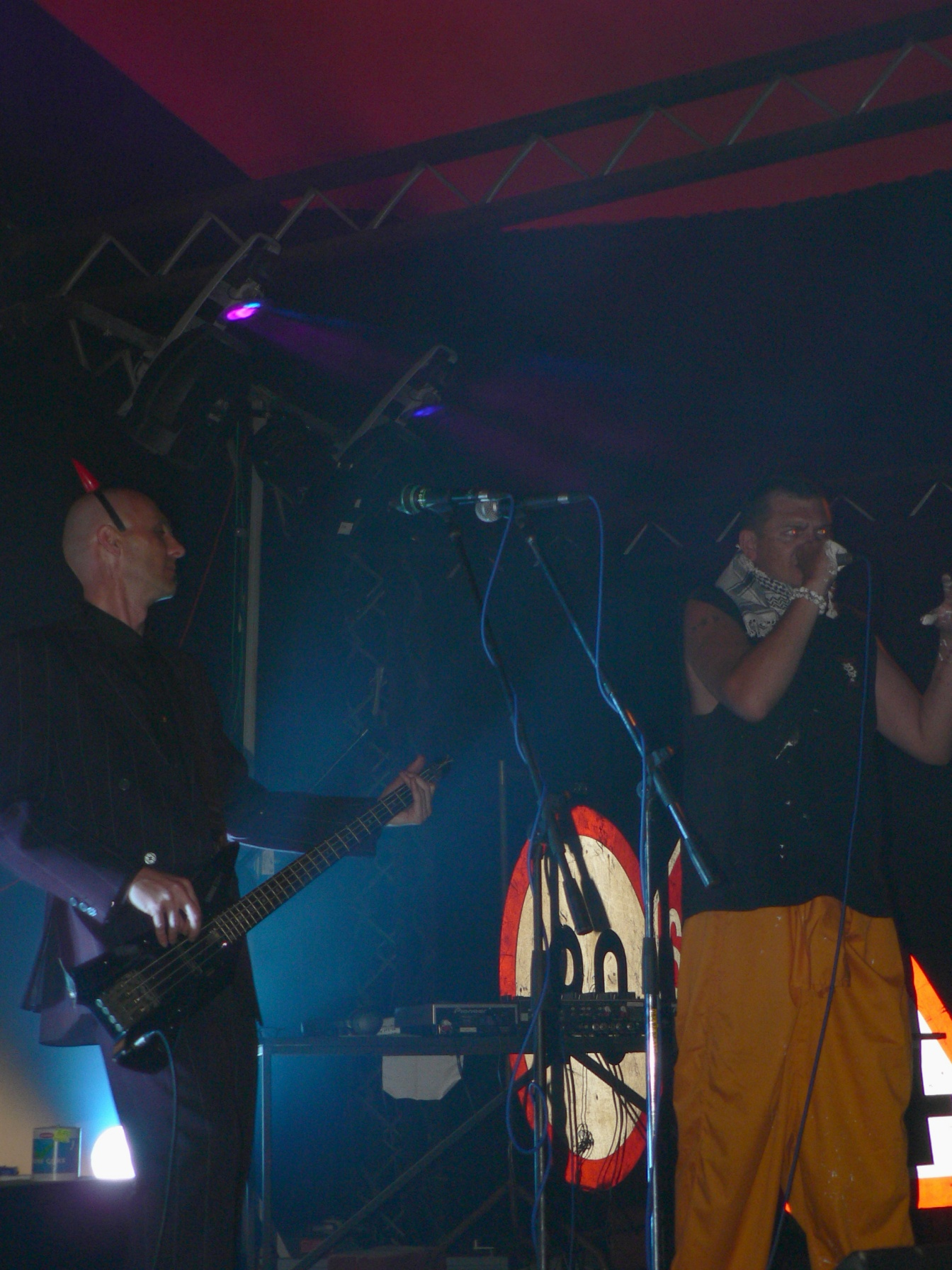
- Battery 9 performing the song "Iets om te Blameer" live at the Klein Libertas in Stellenbosch during the 2007 Woordfees. Paul Riekert is on the left, playing his rare Yamaha bass. Huyser Burger is on the right. Notice his paint-stained fingers.

Background information
- Genres: Industrial music
- Years active: 1994
- Members: Paul Riekert; Huyser Burger; Dawid Kahts; Thys Nywerheid
- Website: battery9.co.za

Battery 9 (pronounced, in Afrikaans, as Butteray Nea-ge), an industrial music project from Johannesburg, South Africa, is the brainchild of Paul Riekert, who writes, plays and records the music in a mixture of English and Afrikaans. The band name is sometimes written, without a space, as Battery9.

== History ==
Riekert started recording under the name Battery 9 in 1994, bored with the creative constraints of a standard rock band format. A platform to run various projects from, One F Music, was subsequently founded, in the form of an independent record label and a small home studio.

The first Battery 9 album, Protskrog, was released in 1995. Made and backed by little more than a shoestring budget, it sold well enough to warrant a licensing deal with independent record company Tic Tic Bang.

The next release, Strop (1996), saw Battery 9 break through to a wider audience, with the song "Kiss the Machine" receiving daytime airplay and eventually charting on 5FM, a major nationwide commercial radio station. For the first time, the major industry took notice and the project received major media coverage, while the live act played for increasingly bigger audiences, culminating in a solo show at the Viper Room in Pretoria in 1997 that drew 1200 people. In the same year, the album Gris, featuring remixes, re-interpretations and interactive CD-ROM data, was released.

Wrok was released in 1998 and was awarded Best Rock Album in that year's South African Music Awards.

After a few major live performances, including supporting The Prodigy and Faithless on their tour in South Africa, Battery 9 took a break for a couple of months to re-assemble the live act. In December 2000 and January 2001, Battery 9, with the newly formed live act, performed a well-received short tour of South Africa. The set included new songs from the album Sondebok which was released in 2002.

After a long break, a sixth album, Straks, was released in late 2005 with almost no marketing or promotion.

The next album, Galbraak, was released in October 2008.

== Current members ==
The band has had quite a few members and incarnations over the years, with Paul Riekert and the 6'8" tall Huyser Burger (also known as DJ Fokkolnonsins) remaining as the only two constants from 1995. The current guitarist is Dawid Kahts, who also plays guitar for NuL and Thys Nywerheid. The band currently performs wearing formal black suits, except for Huyser, who sometimes goes casual. Huyser Burger died on 5 December 2011 from acute kidney and liver failure.

== Unorthodox instruments ==
As befits their industrial image, Battery 9 often uses unorthodox instruments on-stage as well as for recording samples. Examples include road signs, oil drums and other pieces of scrap metal. The blade from a bulldozer was included for a time, but it was abandoned because of the hassle involved in transporting it to the venues. DIY electric implements like drills, angle grinders, and jackhammers are also used, with some more for the visual effect than the musical merit of including it.

== Albums ==
- Protskrog — Album — 20 April 1995 — One F Music / Tic Tic Bang
- Strop — Album — 23 August 1996 — One F Music / Tic Tic Bang
- Strop (Limited Edition) — Album (limited to approximately 300 copies) — 23 August 1996 — One F Music / Tic Tic Bang
- Gris — Remix EP — 29 September 1997 — One F Music / Tic Tic Bang
- Gris (Limited Edition) — Remix EP — 29 September 1997 — One F Music / Tic Tic Bang
- Wrok — Album — 17 October 1998 — One F Music / Tic Tic Bang
- Sondebok — Album — 14 July 2002 — One F Music / Gallo Record Company
- Straks — Album — December 2005 — One F Music
- Galbraak — Album — October 2008 — One F Music
- Grimmig — Album — December 2016 — One F Music

== Compilations ==
- "Ocean Culture"
- "My Generation"
- "Oppikoppi Live"
- "Akwa - Pure South African Dance"
- "Oppikoppi Live"
- "Euphoria - Industrial EBM Compilation"
- "Swerve"
- "Om te Breyten"
- "Essential Indie Vol. 1"
- "Alternatief op sy beste"
- "Mondmusiek - Breyten Breytenbach"
- "Orgazmatracks 3"
- "Barney Simon's Radio Revolution"
- "20 Jaar Later: Van Voëlvry tot Fokof"

== Side projects ==
Paul Riekert and various other members of the band have collaborated on many other musical projects. Examples include the "Breinskade" (Brain damage) album, which mainly featured the smashing of anything they could lay their hands on. More recent projects include the General Dealer electronica album, as well as the eerie almost-folk album "Floukop" by Paul Riekert and Andre van Rensburg (a former Battery 9 guitarist) under the name of "Die Menere".
