= Nul (band) =

Background information
- Origin: South Africa
- Genres: EBM, aggrotech, industrial metal
- Years active: 1998-present
- Members: Adriaan Pelzer; Simon Kruger; Dawid Kahts; Mareli Minnaar; Gerrie Roos; Chris Erasmus

NuL /ˈnʌl/ is a South African band formed in 1998 by Adriaan Pelzer and Simon Kruger, operating as NuL since 2004. NuL creates Afrikaans EBM/Industrial music, and propagates the free distribution of their music. Apart from conventional CD sales, they distribute all of their music freely on the internet, licensed under the Creative Commons Attribution-Noncommercial-NoDerivs license. The music is seeded directly from their website. They also encourage fans on their website to pirate their CD by making the CD artwork of their first CD available as free downloads.

== History ==
When their highly avant-garde rock band, Nothing, broke up in 1998, Adriaan Pelzer and Simon Kruger started experimenting with computer music on a Pentium II 350 MHz, using mainly software like Fruity Loops and Cool Edit Pro, but also experimenting with the possibilities of music production on Linux-based systems. They were both based in Pretoria, South Africa at the time. Initially inspired by the works of Aphex Twin, Autechre and Squarepusher, they produced a number of Glitch-inspired pieces that were later to be released on the Een album.

When Simon moved to London in 2002, Adriaan continued the legacy, and developed the musical style into a more hard-edged, Industrial-influenced direction. Shortly after Simon's return to South Africa in 2004, Adriaan moved to Singapore, where he topped the development of the new, harder style with EBM influences. Here he founded the NuL website, where all of NuL's music is seeded from onto the Internet. In 2006 he returned to South Africa, and together with Simon, Dawid Kahts (Thys Nywerheid), and Adriaan's wife, actress Mareli Minnaar, formed the band, NuL, who are rapidly becoming known for their energetic live performances.

Later in 2006 the band was joined by Visual Artist Niel de Lange, who added a whole new dimension to NuL's live performance with live Video Mixing. In 2007 Gerrie Roos joined NuL as their permanent Sound Engineer, and Chris Erasmus became the seventh member of NuL, as their permanent lighting technician and videographer. After experimental videos made for Swart and Kaper, NuL filmed their first full-fledged Music Video of Online Superstar in the winter of 2008, with Erasmus operating the camera, de Lange as set designer, and Pelzer as Director. The Video featured none of the bandmembers themselves, but instead Dai Zaobab, internationally acclaimed firedancer and self-proclaimed Boabab Hunter. The video was launched on TV for the first time on the Afrikaans music channel, MK.

In 2007 NuL signed a distribution deal with OneF Records, run by Paul Riekert of the first ever, hugely successful Afrikaans Industrial band, Battery9.

2009 saw an increase in activity for NuL following the launch of their third album, Drie, In June. 2009 also brought about some changes in the lineup with the departure of VJ Niel de Lange. The band, opting not to try and replace his artistry, compensated by focusing on introducing a more organic and dynamic feel to their live shows utilising videographer Chris Erasmus' phenomenal ability as a lighting technician.

== Discography ==
=== Een ===
1. Wakkerslaap
2. Op die Spykertafel
3. Rina
4. Die Gatsometer
5. 280g
6. Atari
7. In die Aand in die Spens
8. Die Ysterkoei met Beet
9. Cancancancancancancan
10. Hie Haai Hie Haai Hou
11. Don't mock the Animals
12. Somer III
13. Guy W Brush
14. Nooit op Mars
15. Die Generiese Ooms met die Ligblou Windbreakers

=== Twee ===
1. Online Superstar
2. Vrees
3. Swart
4. Pyn
5. Kokainekop Kosie
6. Kaper
7. Rina
8. Kontaminasie
9. Gerome Djimbovski
10. Hardcore Rina
11. Utopia

=== Drie ===
1. Elektro-Berzerk
2. Über-Rampokker
3. Mystic Bohemia
4. Die Man Van Telkom
5. God red die President
6. Hoëveld
7. Utopia
8. Vloek
9. Kokainekop Kosie (kom af)
10. Vloek dub mix
11. Elektro-Berzerk (refleksie)

=== Unreleased ===
(But downloadable from their website)

1. Laan van Smarte
2. Plek
