= Paul Ndlovu =

Paul Ndlovu (24 July 1954 - 16 September 1986) was a South African musician celebrated as one of the icons of Xitsonga disco. He is remembered for his energetic performances, distinctive style, and contributions to the music scene in the 1980s. Ndlovu died in a car accident in 1986.

== Early Life & Musical Beginnings ==
Paul Ndlovu was born in the village of Lulekani in Limpopo ( great Gazankulu) began his musical career with the group The Big Cats in the late 1970s. He later joined The Cannibals, and then was part of The Street Kids in the early 1980s.

=== Artistic Style and Influence ===
Paul Ndlovu's music blended disco beats with Xitsonga vernacular lyrics, providing not only entertainment but cultural identity to Tsonga-speaking audiences. His work helped pave the way for recognition of disco music from South Africa's rural north, particularly in Lulekani and neighbouring areas. His artistry is remembered for its joyous beats, danceable grooves, and community resonance.

In 1985, Paul launched a solo career. His single "Khombora Mina" achieved gold status and marked his rise as the Shangaan disco "King" or "King of Tsonga Disco."

Other well-known tracks include "Hi ta Famaba Moyeni" and "Tsakani". His style was characterized by infectious rhythms, charismatic stage presence, and trademark accessories, including a sailor's cap.

=== Discography ===
- Khombora Mina (1985) – single, gold status nwamitwatimes.co.za
- Hi ta Famaba Moyeni nwamitwatimes.co.za
- Tsakani nwamitwatimes.co.za
- Cool Me Down (1986) – one of his last singles before his death
