= Moses Mchunu =

Moses Mchunu (born 1953) is a Maskandi musician from KwaZulu-Natal, Nkandla, Mthandanhle Area South Africa. He is well known for his hit "Qhwayilahle", which was featured on the Indestructible Beat of Soweto album in 1985.

Moses Mchunu's style of music is said by musicologists such as Charles Hamm to fall into the neo-traditional form of Mbaqanga - infectious and complex four-bar sequences of acoustic guitar, vocals and harmonies, strong baselines, drums and usually an accordion and/or a fiddle.
