= Charles Segal (pianist) =

American Jazz pianist (1929–2021)

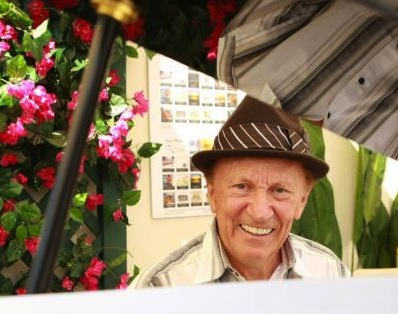

Background information
- Born: 15 June 1929; Joniškis, Lithuania
- Died: 4 July 2021 (aged 92) Los Angeles, California, U.S.
- Occupations: Pianist, composer

Charles Segal (15 June 1929 – 4 July 2021) was a classically trained jazz and commercial pianist, and composer.

== Biography ==
Charles Segal was born in 1929 in Joniškis, Lithuania. When he was two years old, his mother, mandolinist Riva Segal, brought her two sons, Louis and Charles, from Lithuania to Cape Town, South Africa. They travelled from Germany on the SS Adolph Woermann. Riva also brought along her half-sister and her family: Ella (née Zotnickaita) and Ber Skikne and their three sons, the youngest being Hirske, who became renowned actor Laurence Harvey. Segal studied classical music, becoming an Associate (ATCL) and a Licentiate of Trinity College London (LTCL) in performance and teaching. Segal had a well-known musical career as a pianist, composer, publisher, arranger and teacher. He was a founding member of the Southern African Music Rights Organisation (SAMRO) and the Drama and Literary Rights Organization (DALRO) in 1961 along with Dr. Gideon Roos Senior. Charles Segal Music School in Pretoria and Cape Town were the largest in the country. In 1971, Segal met his third wife, Colleen Hay, an actress, musician and singer in the popular band called The In-Set. After obtaining degrees at UCT, Colleen founded the Hay-Schneider School of Speech and Drama in Cape Town and the Centre Stage Theatre School in Newton, MA, USA. The couple had two children together, Reeve Segal, attorney, and Melanie Segal, PR expert. Segal also has two older children from his second marriage, Michelle Barone and Mark Shapiro.

== Career ==
Segal, an English-speaking, Jewish pianist, first gained public recognition in 1952 when his first song, the Afrikaans "Miskien" ("Perhaps"), won the Rooi Roos magazine song-writing competition. From 1953 to 1986, Segal performed regularly on live and recorded SABC radio shows in South Africa, such as Piano Playtime, Sundown Serenade and SA Showtime, and in the US was featured on Supreme Master Television. The Music of Charles Segal on the SABC television network was a 1985 TV special featuring a wide range of South African musicians performing Segal's original compositions.

Segal composed, performed and arranged 50 transcription long-playing recordings for the SABC and was frequently commissioned to compose music for SABC productions, such as The Forsyte Saga, The Story of an African Farm, and The Saga of Prunella and The Summons. His song "Carousel" was the theme for the "Radio RSA" overseas broadcasts from 1969 through 1996. Numerous Charles Segal compositions have become part of traditional South African music: songs such as "Africa", "Kwela, Kwela", "Sy Kom Van Kommetjie", "Kalkoenkie" and "Hy-Ba-Ba-Rie-Bab", many of which were sung in Afrikaans. In 1973, Segal's song "My Children, My Wife" (Segal-Roos), was voted by the South African audiences as the Song of the Year. Segal was presented with the SARIE Award (equivalent to a Grammy Award) by Dr. Christiaan Barnard, renowned surgeon who performed the world's first heart transplant. "My Children, My Wife" (Segal-Roos) was subsequently recorded in the Netherlands, Germany, England (by Rolf Harris and Israel and reached European hit parades.

Segal founded Spin Record Company in 1954 to record and promote his music. Once established as a popular performer, Segal was recruited by other record labels, such as Trutone, Gallo Africa, Trek Music, CBS, MFP Music for Pleasure and Reader's Digest to record on their labels. Segal's Publications was established in 1953 to maintain the copyright of Charles Segal compositions, to publish popular Segal songs on sheet music and to also promote fellow musicians and songwriters. Segal's Publications is also known as Charles Segal Publications and is affiliated with BMI. Some popular Charles Segal Sheet Music Albums include: "Charles Segal's Favourite Melodies," "Charles Segal's Favourite Melodies Volume 2," "The Charles Segal Dorothy Arenson Song Book," and "Sing With Charles Segal." Children's sheet music albums include "Magical Mystery Man," "Everyday Things," "Animal Concert," and "Sprankelende Liedjies."

Segal's Publications also published music tutor books in English and Afrikaans, including Home Piano Course for Beginners, Volumes 1 and 2, Instant Organ and Kits Orrel, Instant Chord Book for the Piano, Instant Keyboard and Instant Songwriting.

Segal's musical career spread to other parts of the world, including London (1961), Boston (1967), and in New York where his song "Another Time, Another Place", written with US lyricist Gladys Shelly (1968), was recorded by jazz singer Arthur Prysock. Other hits written in the USA include "Girl Power" with Sheila Davis and "Tomboy", sung by Ronnie Dove, which received a "bullet" rating in Billboard magazine in 1968. Segal's song "You're Not Alone", written with lyricist Barbara Brilliant, was featured at an AIDS Foundation fundraiser at the Boston Garden in 1992, where Joan Rivers was the M.C., and his song "Just Talk to Me" was the theme song of a 1990s TV talk show of the same name on Boston's WBZ-TV, with presenter Barbara Brilliant.

Segal composed eight full-length musicals with his wife Colleen Segal (née Hay), which have been performed in South Africa, the US, Britain and Australia. These musicals include: Magical Mystery Man, Living! The Inside Story, Rocky Road, Mystery Mansion, Once upon a Storyland, Melanie! and Summer Camp. In 1987, shortly after arriving in the USA, the pair wrote a musical called Freedom! A Refusenik Story. They also wrote and published several music tutor books, such as Instant Keyboard, Instant Guitar, and Instant Songwriting. Segal was a member of BMI as a songwriter and publisher.

Segal moved from Boston to Los Angeles in 2011. He performed on piano regularly at celebrity events for award shows such as the Oscars and Emmys, the MTV Movie Awards and the Kids Choice and Teen Choice Awards. In June 2017, Segal was awarded the Guinness Book of World Records title of Most Recorded Pianist in the world, citing 11,721 tracks of his more than 25,000 recorded titles.

Segal died at the age of 92 in Hollywood, California, on 4 July 2021, as the Independence day fireworks blazed outside. He is buried at the famous Hollywood Forever Cemetery.

== Awards ==
- SARIE AWARD (South Africa Record Industry) "1973 Song of the Year" – "My Children, My Wife."
- SABC AWARD (South African Broadcast Corporation) "Song of the Year" – "Carousel."
