= Dancemania 9 =

Compilation album by various artists
- Released: April 29, 1998
- Genres: Electronic, pop (Europop, Euro house)
- Length: 74:00
- Label: EMI Music Japan
- Producers: Masaaki Saito (executive producer); Hiro Kadoma (producer)

Dancemania chronology
8 (1998)	Dancemania 9 (1998)	10 (1998)

Dancemania 9 is the ninth set in the Dancemania series of dance music compilation albums, released in 1998 by EMI Music Japan.

The album debuted at #12 on Oricon's weekly album chart in May 1998 and remained within the top 20 positions on the chart for 4 consecutive weeks, peaking at #10.

The non-stop mixing was done by the Swedish DJ also credited as Disco Dude on the album, JJ.

== Tracks ==
#	Track	By	Ref
1	Baby Please Me	E-Rotic	
2	Super Hero	Fireman	
3	Follow Me	Captain Jack	
4	Cafe Cafe	Vivian	
5	Single	Popsie	
6	Amnesia	Chumbawamba	
7	Oh La La La	2 Eivissa	
8	Let's Get Down	JT Playaz	
9	Get Up (On the Dancefloor)	Disco Dude	
10	I Feel Love	Vanessa Mae	
11	Day By Day	Regina	
12	Children's Voices	T 4 2	
13	You Make Me Feel Brand New	The Scarlet	
14	Be My Lover	Luna	
15	Virtual Lover	Debbie Clark	
16	This Must Be Love	Pixie	
17	Heaven	Berri	
18	Tell Me	Peach	
19	Pray	DJ BoBo	
20	It Could Be Love	Elektra	
21	You	Alexia Phillips	
22	Lucky Star	Marysia	
23	Cybersex Lovegame	DJ Company	

== Further details ==
Intro with #1 "Baby Please Me"
"Baby Please Me" was taken from E-Rotic's first greatest hits album, Greatest Tits.

The album's overall average tempo is 136 bpm;

The lowest bpm is 115 (#5).
The highest bpm is 160 (#2-4).

The album contains 3 covers or remixes.

#8 "Let's Get Down" is a remix / cover of Kool & the Gang's "Celebration".
#10 "I Feel Love" is a cover of Donna Summer's "I Feel Love".
#13 "You Make Me Feel Brand New" is a cover of The Stylistics' "You Make Me Feel Brand New".

Several tracks on the album, including different remixes, can also be found on other Dancemania albums such as 5, Extra, Happy Paradise 2, Speed 8, Delux 3, Best Yellow, Scorccio Super Hit Mix, Disco Groove, Bass #5 or Winters.

#	Track	Length	BPM	Ref	Artist(s)	From / based in	Ref
1	Baby Please Me	3:30	140		E-Rotic	Germany	
2	Super Hero	3:02	160		Fireman	Italy	
3	Follow Me	3:30	160		Captain Jack	Germany	
4	Cafe Cafe	3:31	160		Vivian	El Salvador Germany	
5	Single	3:22	115		Popsie	Sweden	
6	Amnesia	3:14	128		Chumbawamba	United Kingdom	
7	Oh La La La	3:02	128		2 Eivissa	Germany	
8	Let's Get Down	3:26	128		JT Playaz	United Kingdom	
9	Get Up (On the Dancefloor)	3:39	129		Disco Dude	Sweden	
10	I Feel Love	2:57	130		Vanessa Mae	Singapore	
11	Day By Day	2:27	130		Regina	Brazil / Italy	
12	Children's Voices	3:29	130		T 4 2	Italy	
13	You Make Me Feel Brand New	3:02	130		The Scarlet	Unknown	—
14	Be My Lover	2:53	132		Luna	Italy	
15	Virtual Lover	2:40	137		Debbie Clark	Italy	
16	This Must Be Love	3:11	135		Pixie	Germany	
17	Heaven	3:49	135		Berri	United Kingdom	
18	Tell Me	3:23	137		Peach	United Kingdom	
19	Pray	3:29	137		DJ BoBo	Switzerland	
20	It Could Be Love	3:07	138		Elektra	Jamaica / Italy	
21	You	3:23	138		Alexia Phillips	United States Canada	
22	Lucky Star	3:04	138		Marysia	Poland	
23	Cybersex Lovegame	3:33	146		DJ Company	Germany	
