= Exp =

Exp or EXP may stand for:

- Exponential function, in mathematics
- Expiry date of organic compounds like food or medicines
- Experience points, in role-playing games
- EXPTIME, a complexity class in computing
- Ford EXP, a car manufactured in the 1980s
- Exp (band), an Italian group in the 1990s
- "EXP" (song), a song by The Jimi Hendrix Experience from the album Axis: Bold as Love
- EXP (calculator key), to enter numbers in scientific or engineering notation
- EXP, a building located at Northeastern University in Boston

== See also ==
- Exponential map (disambiguation)
