= Dancemania 3 =

Compilation album by various artists
- Released: October 9, 1996
- Genres: Electronic (Euro house, Happy hardcore, disco)
- Length: 75:00
- Labels: Intercord Japan (EMI Music Japan)
- Producers: Masaaki Saito (executive producer); Hitoshi Namekata (producer)

Dancemania chronology
2 (1996)	Dancemania 3 (1996)	4 (1997)

Dancemania 3 is the third set in the Dancemania series of dance music compilation albums, released in 1996 by EMI Music Japan.

The non-stop mixing was done by Flex Records, a Danish dance label.

== Tracks ==
#	Track	By	Ref
1	Help Me Dr. Dick	E-Rotic	
2	Soldier Soldier	Captain Jack	
3	Ladies Night	7T feat. Kool & The Gang, J.T. and Takia	
4	Let's Groove Rap	Big Mama feat. DJ Max	
5	Can't Stop This Feeling	Nina	
6	Xanadu	The Olivia Project feat. Paula	
7	Sunshine	Umboza	
8	Everybody	Worlds Apart	
9	Come On and Do It	Pandora	
10	Dream of the Night	EXP	
11	Got To Believe	Amya	
12	You and Me	Airbag	
13	Around and 'Round	Ann Bell Fell	
14	Move Your Body	Sultans of Dance	
15	World of Freedom	Magic Affair	
16	Got To Get It On	KC Linn	
17	Give Me Something To Dance To	Spikey	
18	Without You	Body Parts	
19	United States of Japan	Mach 7	
20	Where Have All the Flowers Gone	Central Park	
21	I Want Your Mind	Habegale	

== Further details ==
Intro with "Help Me Dr. Dick"
"Help Me Dr. Dick" was also included on E-Rotic's 2nd album The Power of Sex.

The non-stop mixing was handled by Danish dance label Flex Records, mainly, its two main producers; Kenneth Bager and Michael Pfundheller.

The album's overall average tempo is 138 bpm;

#1 The slowest track is "Help Me Dr. Dick" at 103 bpm.
#21 The fastest track is "I Want Your Mind" at 180 bpm.

Several tracks are cover versions or remix versions.

#4 "Let's Groove Rap" is a cover version of Earth, Wind & Fire's "Let's Groove".
#6 "Xanadu" is a cover remix version of Olivia Newton-John's "Xanadu".
#7 "Sunshine" sampled Gipsy Kings' "Bamboleo".
#20 "Where Have All the Flowers Gone" is a cover version of Marlene Dietrich's "Where Have All the Flowers Gone?".

Several tracks on the album can also be found on other Dancemania albums, such as Delux, Zip Mania, Extra, Best Red or Summers.

#	Track	BPM	Ref	Artist(s)	From / based in	Ref
1	Help Me Dr. Dick	103		E-Rotic	Germany	
2	Soldier Soldier	124		Captain Jack	Germany	
3	Ladies Night	124		7T feat. Kool & The Gang, J.T. and Takia	Germany	
4	Let's Groove Rap	125		Big Mama feat. DJ Max	Ghana / Italy	
5	Can't Stop This Feeling	125		Nina	Germany	
6	Xanadu	127		Olivia feat. Paula	Australia	
7	Sunshine	128		Umboza	United Kingdom	
8	Everybody	140		Worlds Apart	Germany / (United Kingdom) UK	
9	Come On and Do It	140		Pandora	Sweden	
10	Dream of The Night	137		EXP	Italy	
11	Got To Believe	135		Amya	Italy	
12	You and Me	135		Airbag	Germany	
13	Around and 'Round	136		Ann Bell Fell	Finland	
14	Move Your Body	139		Sultans of Dance	Israel	
15	World of Freedom	140		Magic Affair	Germany	
16	Got To Get It On	140		KC Linn	Sweden	
17	Give Me Something To Dance To	140		Spikey	Denmark	
18	Without You	156		Body Parts	Netherlands	
19	United States of Japan	157		Mach 7	Sweden	
20	Where Have All the Flowers Gone	162		Central Park	Germany	
21	I Want Your Mind	180		Habegale	Italy	
