= Paloma Lokus =

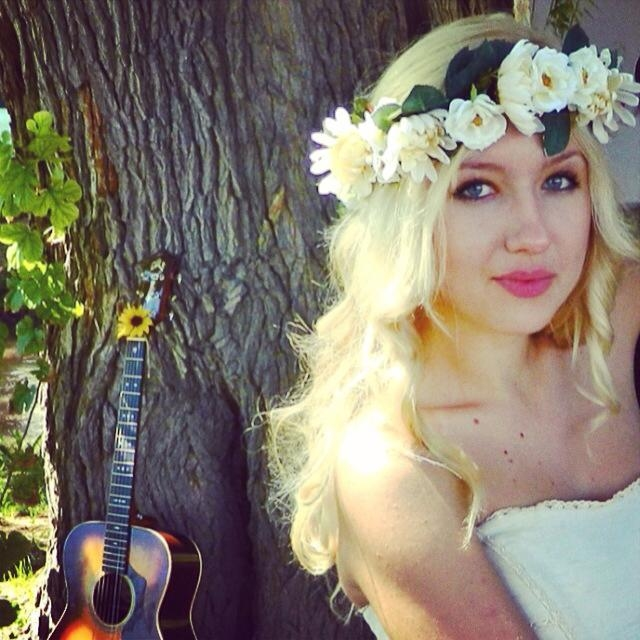
- Paloma Lokus in 2015
- Born: 1 May 1997 (age 29); Chicago, Illinois
- Occupation: Singer-songwriter
- Musical career
- Genres: Country
- Instruments: Vocals, guitar
- Years active: 2010–present
- Website: palomalokus.blogspot.com

Paloma Lokus is a singer-songwriter based in Arizona. She competed in season six of The Voice of Poland, the internationally syndicated version of NBC's The Voice singing competition.

== Early life ==
Lokus was born in Chicago, Illinois, to Polish nationals. As a Polish American she carries dual citizenship in the United States and Poland.

== Career ==
Lokus recorded her first song at the age of thirteen. She recorded her first album, "Country Girls Do it Better", in 2013, and won first place in that year's "Northern Arizona's Got Talent" competition in the "thirteen to eighteen year old" category. In June 2014 she competed and won first place in the annual "PV Idol" singing competition in Prescott Valley, Arizona.

== The Voice of Poland ==
In episode 6 of The Voice of Poland season 6, at the blind auditions of Warsaw, aired on 19 September 2015, Lokus performed the song "Stay" from the country band Sugarland. Pop star judge Maria Sadowska prompted singer Andrzej Piaseczny to turn his chair and then she quickly followed suit. Artist Edyta Górniak also turned her chair around in the last seconds of the song, resulting in approval from three out of four judges. Lokus selected Piaseczny to be her coach in the show.

Her "Voice" appearance and audition in Poland were positively received by the media, yet gained mixed reviews among the social media audience due to the fact that she was born and raised in the United States and had traveled to Poland to compete in the show. "Interia Muzyka" reported that, "Paloma had in fact been criticized by some fans of "The Voice of Poland" for having signed up to the program in our country."

Polish station Radio Eska likened her performance to that of a "young Taylor Swift", and stated that she "won the hearts of the judges".
