= Dancemania 7 =

Compilation album by various artists
- Released: October 16, 1997
- Genre: Electronic, pop (house, Euro house, synthpop)
- Length: 67:00
- Label: EMI Music Japan
- Producer: Masaaki Saito (executive producer); Hiro Kadoma (producer)

Dancemania chronology
6 (1997)	Dancemania 7 (1997)	8 (1998)

Dancemania 7 is the seventh set in the Dancemania series of dance music compilation albums, released in 1997 by EMI Music Japan.

The album debuted at #10 on Oricon's weekly album chart in October 1997 and remained within the top 20 positions on the chart for 3 consecutive weeks, peaking at #8.

The non-stop mixing was done by Captain Jack.

== Tracks ==
#	Track	By	Ref
1	Secret Agent	Captain Jack	
2	The Winner Takes It All	E-Rotic	
3	Sexual Madness	E-Rotic	
4	That's The Way '97	X-Treme	
5	Dam Dam Deo	Felicidad	
6	Lovin' & Devotion	Love & Devotion	
7	Snow On A Hot Day	Bertine	
8	Crazy	Marysia	
9	Wanna B Like A Man	Simone Jay	
10	Every Life Unfolds	T42	
11	In My Arms	Wildside	
12	Feel The Power of Love	Jampack feat. Bee	
13	Dance With Me	Claudja	
14	I Can Never Get Enough	In Heaven	
15	We Can Do It	Exil	
16	Kiss	Verona	
17	Dunga! Dunga!	EXP feat. Julia	
18	Honeymoon Couple	Pa-Do-Do	
19	Open Your Eyes	Koko	
20	Get On Up	Nylon	
21	Try My Love	Jacynthe	
22	Moonlight Shadow	Missing Heart	
23	I Believe	Jemma & Elise	

== Further details ==
#5 Dam Dam Deo
Track 5, "Dam Dam Deo", originally released in June 1997 in France, was the debut single by the Colombian-Spanish-Brazilian latin-dance group Felicidad, which reached the top 3 on the French singles chart with more than 400,000 copies sold.

The album's overall average tempo is 133 bpm;

The slowest track is "That's The Way '97" (#4) at 116 bpm.
The fastest track is "I Believe" (#23) at 160 bpm.

Several tracks are cover versions or remix versions.

#2 "The Winner Takes It All" is a cover version of ABBA's "The Winner Takes It All".
#4 "That's The Way '97" is a remix version of Redhead Kingpin and the F.B.I.'s "Do the Right Thing".
#22 "Moonlight Shadow" is a dance cover version of Mike Oldfield's "Moonlight Shadow".

Several tracks on the album, including different remixes, can also be found on other Dancemania albums such as Classics, Club Classics, Club The Earth, Club The Earth Disco Classics, Summers, Extra, Diamond, Diamond Complete Edition, Best Yellow, Best Red, Zip Mania, Zip Mania Best, Scorccio Super Hit Mix, Disco Groove, Delux 2, Delux 5, Speed 1, Covers 1 or X8.

#	Track	Length	BPM	Ref	Artist(s)	From / based in	Ref
1	Secret Agent	3:57	150		Captain Jack	Germany	
2	The Winner Takes It All	2:43	130		E-Rotic	Germany	
3	Sexual Madness	2:42	128		E-Rotic	Germany	
4	That's The Way '97	2:46	116		X-Treme	Italy	
5	Dam Dam Deo	2:29	121		Felicidad	France	
6	Lovin' & Devotion	2:39	120		Love & Devotion	Sweden	
7	Snow On A Hot Day	2:31	128		Bertine	Norway	
8	Crazy	2:37	132		Marysia	Poland	
9	Wanna B Like A Man	2:42	130		Simone Jay	(United States) USA / Italy	
10	Every Life Unfolds	2:45	129		T42	Italy	
11	In My Arms	2:42	132		Wildside	Italy	
12	Feel The Power of Love	3:07	129		Jampack feat. Bee	Denmark	
13	Dance With Me	2:43	130		Claudja	Italy	
14	I Can Never Get Enough	2:46	132		In Heaven	Germany	
15	We Can Do It	2:54	132		Exil	(Czech Republic) Czech	
16	Kiss	2:50	135		Verona	Germany	
17	Dunga! Dunga!	3:11	135		EXP feat. Julia	Italy	
18	Honeymoon Couple	2:49	139		Pa-Do-Do	Hungary	
19	Open Your Eyes	3:14	141		Koko	United Kingdom	
20	Get On Up	2:42	138		Nylon	Unknown	—
21	Try My Love	2:57	138		Jacynthe	Canada	
22	Moonlight Shadow	3:54	140		Missing Heart	Germany	
23	I Believe	3:57	160		Jemma & Elise	Sweden	
