= Fun Master =

Slovak Eurodance group

- Origin: Slovakia
- Genres: Eurodance
- Members: Luli; The Vacancy; DJ Jay

Fun Master was a Slovak Eurodance group from the 1990s, consisting of three members; Luli, The Vacancy, DJ Jay.

The band was originally formed as "2 Livz" by The Vacancy and DJ Jay after they met in a university in Czechoslovakia. Luli, a former member of girl group LEA, joined the band, and the band changed its name to Fun Master. Fun Master released its debut single "We Shall Dance/The Lights Go Down" in 1996.

They released one album, Dolce Vita, in 1997, and had moderate success in Slovakia with the singles "The Bird Song '97", "FunTasy", and "We Shall Dance". "The Bird Song '97" was a cover of The Tweets' "The Birdie Song". "We Shall Dance" was a cover of Demis Roussos' same-titled song, and was featured on Dancemania's fourth issue released in 1997.
