= The Voice of Poland season 7 =

The Voice of Poland
- Season 7
- Hosted by: Barbara Kurdej-Szatan; Maciej Musiał; Tomasz Kammel
- Judges: Natalia Kukulska; Andrzej Piaseczny; Maria Sadowska; Tomson & Baron
- Winner: Mateusz Grędziński
- Runner-up: Weronika Curyło

Release
- Original network: TVP2
- Original release: September 3 – November 26, 2016

Season chronology
- ← Previous; Season 6 Next → Season 8

The seventh season of The Voice of Poland began airing 3 September 2016 on TVP 2. It aired on Saturdays at 20:05 and 21:10.

Tomson & Baron, Andrzej Piaseczny and Maria Sadowska returned as coaches, while Natalia Kukulska replaced Edyta Górniak. Tomasz Kammel and Maciej Musiał to the role of leading she joined Barbara Kurdej-Szatan replacing singer Halina Mlynkova.

== Coaches ==
Tomson & Baron, Maria Sadowska and Andrzej Piaseczny return as coaches for the 7th edition. Natalia Kukulska replace the role of jurors Edyta Górniak, who resigned from the post of judges in a professional capacity. Moderators Tomasz Kammel, Maciej Musiał, Halina Mlynkova, Remigiusz Jakub Wierzgoń a.k.a. "ReZigiusz" joins the "V-reporter" Marta Siurnik.

Coaches and Hosts gallery

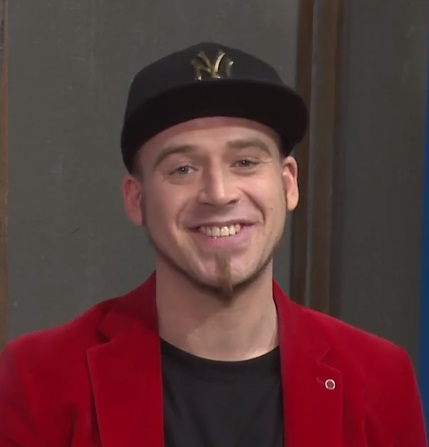
Tomasz Lach (duo)

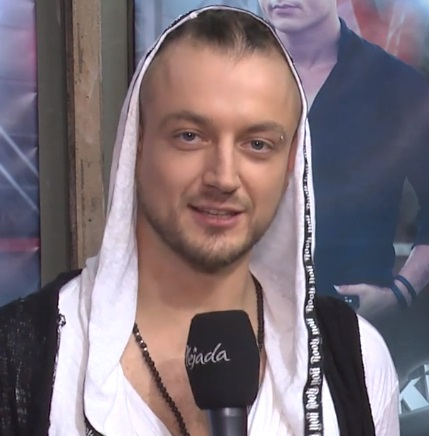
Aleksandr Milwiw-Baron (duo)

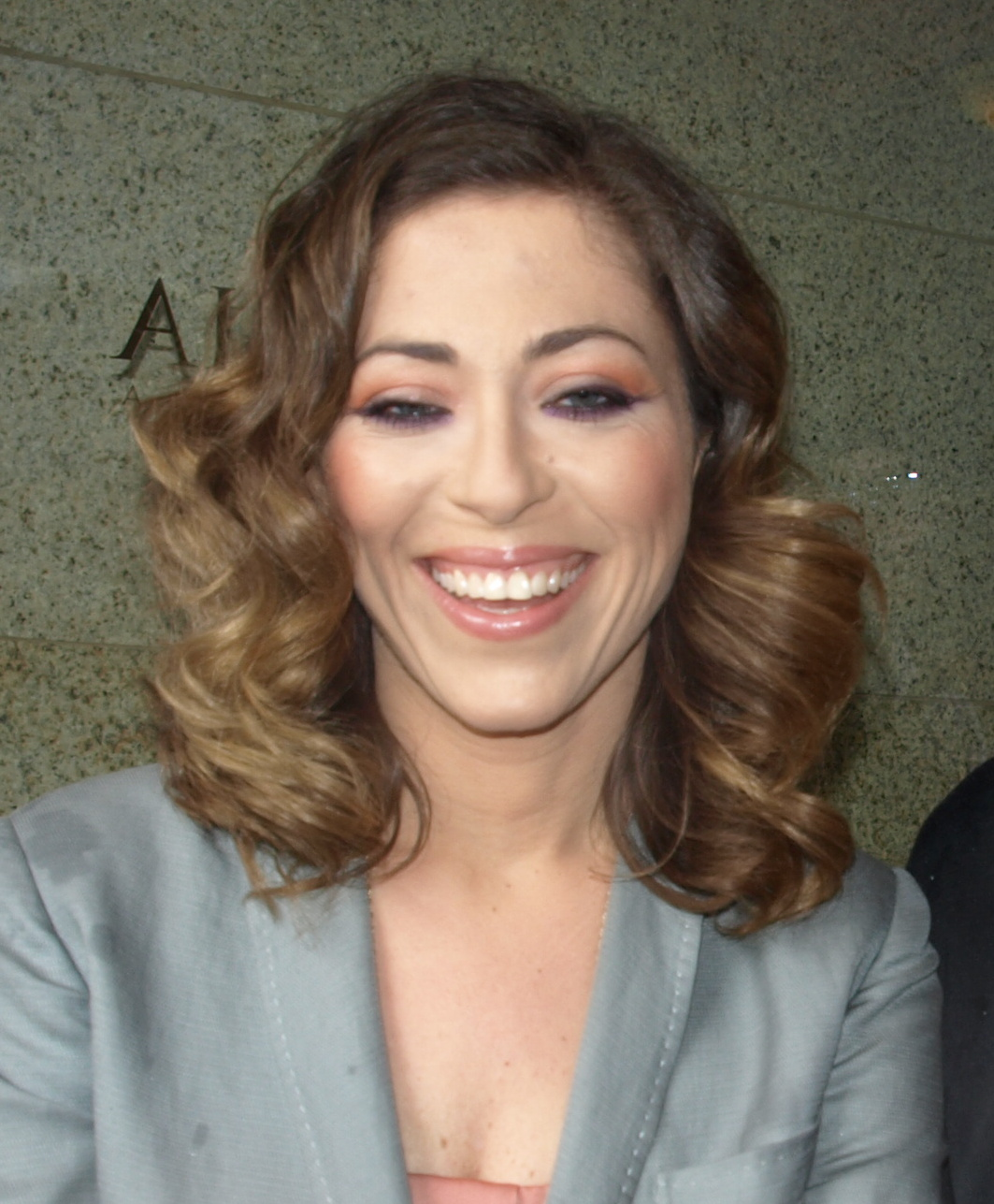
Natalia Kukulska

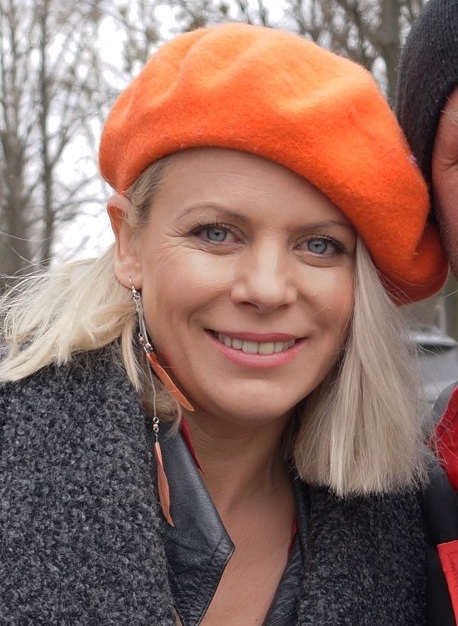
Maria Sadowska

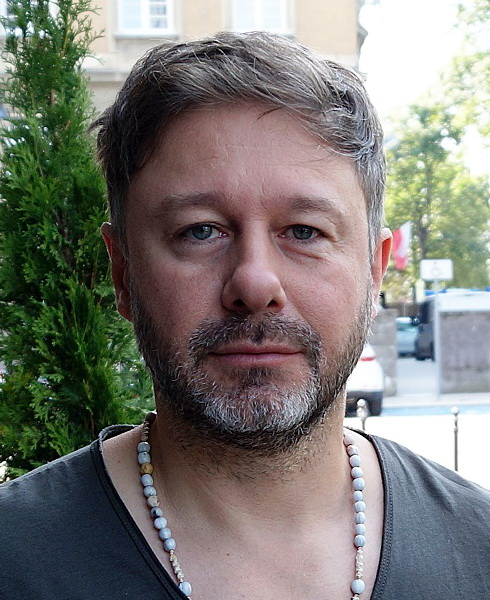
Andrzej Piaseczny

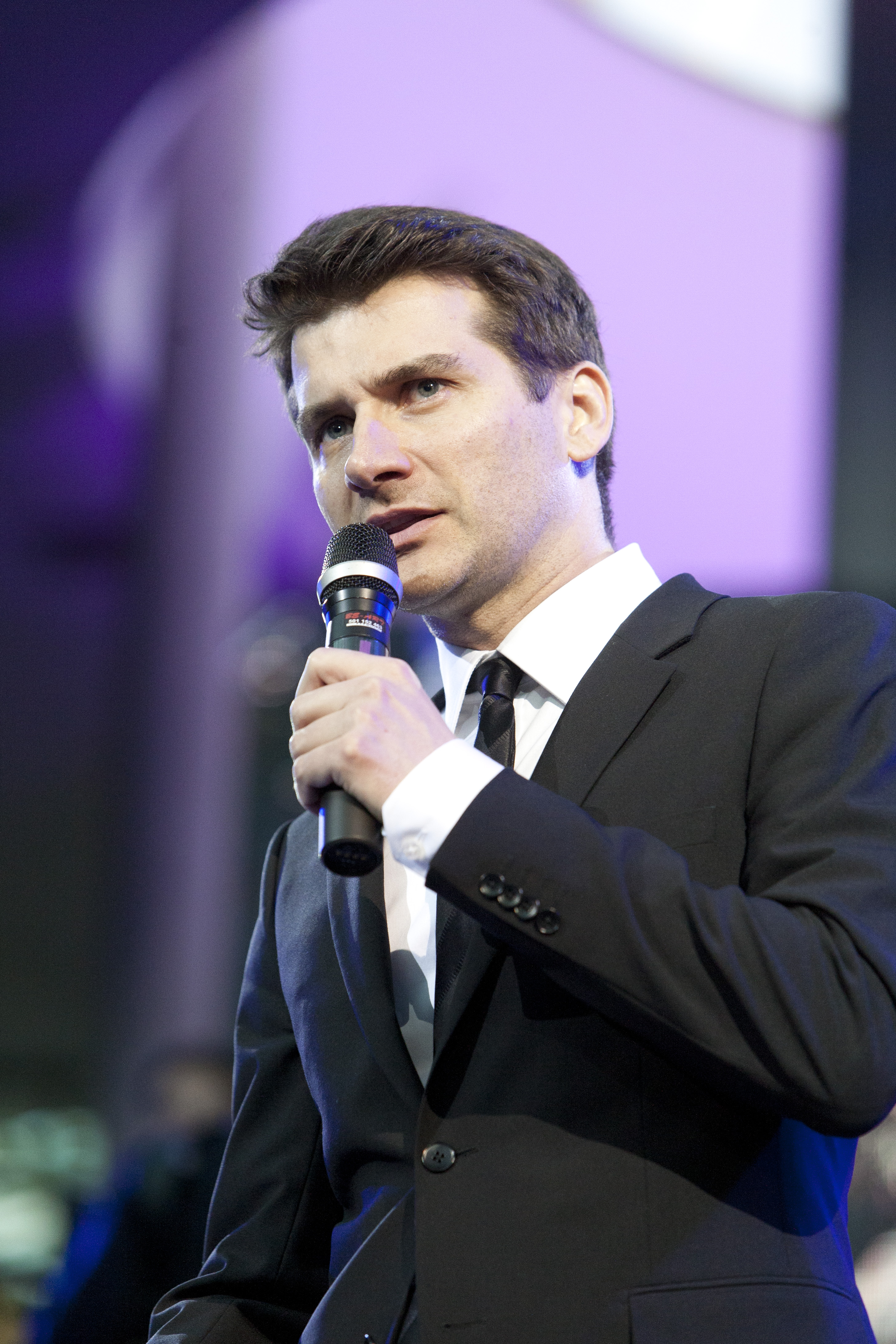
Tomasz Kammel

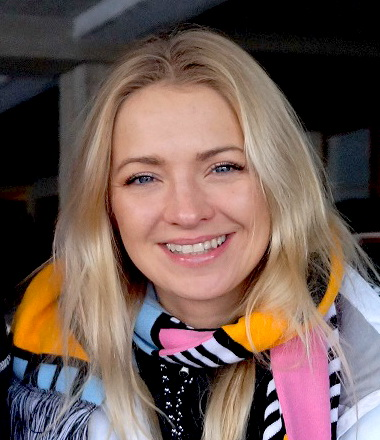
Barbara Kurdej-Szatan

== Teams ==
Color key

- Winner
- Runner-up
- Third place
- Fourth place
- Eliminated in the Semifinals
- Eliminated in the Quarterfinals
- Eliminated in the Live round
- Eliminated in the Knockout round
- Artist was stolen by another coach (Name is strikethroughed)
- Artist was stolen but was later switched with another artist and got eliminated
- Eliminated in the Battle rounds

Coaches	Top 52 artists				
Tomson & Baron					
Tomson & Baron	Weronika Curyło	Marcelina Mróz	Tomasz Trzeszczyński	Filip Lato	Ewelina Bogucka
Tomson & Baron	Maja Wojtaszek	Sybilla Sobczyk	~~Łukasz Bąkowski~~	Agata Buczkowska	Ola Leśniewicz
Tomson & Baron	Sebastian Wojtczak & Daniel Rychter	Natalia Juszczyszyn	Adam Stachowiak	Eva Novel	
Natalia Kukulska					
Natalia Kukulska	Ania Karwan	Damian Rybicki	Patryk Wasilewski	Olga Barej	Patryk Krajewski
Natalia Kukulska	Beata Romanowska	Karolina Gefert	~~Aga Damrych~~	Kuba Adamus	Edyta Cymer
Natalia Kukulska	Magdalena Żaczek	Paulina Stefanowska	Joanna Kaczmarkiewicz	Piotr Kościuszko	
Andrzej Piaseczny					
Andrzej Piaseczny	Mateusz Grędziński	Sami Harb	Łukasz Bąkowski	Ania Waszkiewicz	Krzysztof Grześkiewicz
Andrzej Piaseczny	Filip Rychcik	Mateusz Pichal	Olga Przybysz	Tomasz Turek	Michał Stryczniewicz
Andrzej Piaseczny	Julita Trautsolt	Karolina Dąbrowska	Violka Marcinkiewicz	Paweł Jarzynka	
Maria Sadowska					
Maria Sadowska	Katarzyna Góras	Mateusz Guzowski	Ewelina Przybyła	Aga Damrych	Justyna Gajczak
Maria Sadowska	Monika Kitel	Rafał Kozok	~~Weronika Curyło~~	~~Beata Romanowska~~	Beata Spychalska
Maria Sadowska	Artur Bomert	Zuzanna Kotecka	Patrycja Koszewska	Sonia Stochmiałek	

== Blind auditions ==
Color keys

✔	Coach hit his/her "I WANT YOU" button
	Artist defaulted to this coach's team
	Artist elected to join this coach's team
	Artist eliminated with no coach pressing his or her "I WANT YOU" button
	Artist received an 'All Turn'.

=== Episode 1 (September 3, 2016) ===
Order	Artist	Age	Song	Coach's and contestant's choices				
Order	Artist	Age	Song	Tomson & Baron	Natalia	Andrzej	Maria	Homecoach App
1	Sybilla Sobczyk	21	"Moje życie to"	✔	—	✔	✔	21%
2	Wojciech Metlicki	23	"Zacznij od Bacha"	—	—	—	—	36%
3	Karolina Gefert	18	"Like I'm Gonna Lose You"	—	✔	✔	✔	91%
4	Agata Buczkowska	18	"Maniac"	✔	—	✔	—	57%
5	Aga Damrych	32	"Omen"	✔	✔	✔	—	43%
6	Sami Harb	27	"Love on the Brain"	✔	✔	✔	✔	100%

=== Episode 2 (September 3, 2016) ===
Order	Artist	Age	Song	Coach's and contestant's choices				
Order	Artist	Age	Song	Tomson & Baron	Natalia	Andrzej	Maria	Homecoach App
1	Olga Przybysz	19	"When We Were Young"	—	—	✔	✔	39%
2	Mateusz Guzowski	20	"Poza logiką"	—	✔	—	✔	39%
3	Damian Rybicki	29	"The Most Beautiful Girl in the World"	✔	✔	✔	✔	75%
4	Anna Waszkiewicz	36	"Under Pressure"	—	—	✔	—	52%
5	Weronika Curyło	16	"Georgia on My Mind"	—	✔	✔	✔	41%
6	Marika Kraujutowicz	24	"Wilk"	—	—	—	—	57%
7	Ewelina Bogucka	17	"Takiego chłopaka"	✔	—	—	—	84%

=== Episode 3 (September 10, 2016) ===
Order	Artist	Age	Song	Coach's and contestant's choices				
Order	Artist	Age	Song	Tomson & Baron	Natalia	Andrzej	Maria	Homecoach App
1	Patryk Krajewski	20	"Like I'm Gonna Lose You"	✔	✔	✔	✔	42%
2	Monika Kitel	37	"A Whiter Shade of Pale"	✔	—	✔	✔	45%
3	Mateusz Frankowski	24	"Livin' on the Edge"	—	—	—	—	—
4	Paweł Jarzynka	26	"For Once in My Life"	—	—	✔	—	52%
5	Patrycja Malinowska	27	"Ruchome piaski"	—	—	—	—	—
6	Krzysztof Grześkiewicz	25	"Nights in White Satin"	—	—	✔	—	31%
7	Eva Novel	29	"Bust Your Windows"	✔	✔	—	✔	79%

=== Episode 4 (September 10, 2016) ===
Order	Artist	Age	Song	Coach's and contestant's choices				
Order	Artist	Age	Song	Tomson & Baron	Natalia	Andrzej	Maria	Homecoach App
1	Klaudia Grubska	19	"Zaopiekuj się mną"	—	—	—	—	39%
2	Łukasz Bąkowski	21	"The Reason"	✔	✔	✔	✔	55%
3	Beata Romanowska	20	"Horses"	—	—	✔	✔	33%
4	Filip Lato	24	"She Will Be Loved"	✔	—	✔	✔	77%
5	Katarzyna Góras	18	"Runnin' (Lose It All)"	—	✔	—	✔	84%
6	Piotr Mogielnicki	35	"Moje życie to"	—	—	—	—	—
7	Ania Karwan	30	"Purple Rain"	✔	✔	✔	✔	100%

=== Episode 5 (September 17, 2016) ===
Order	Artist	Age	Song	Coach's and contestant's choices				
Order	Artist	Age	Song	Tomson & Baron	Natalia	Andrzej	Maria	Homecoach App
1	Ewelina Przybyła	26	"Don't Be So Hard on Yourself"	—	—	✔	✔	51%
2	Artur Bomert	33	"Jak na lotni"	✔	—	—	✔	25%
3	Magdalena Żaczek	17	"Radość najpiękniejszych lat"	—	✔	✔	—	57%
4	Katerina Pochapynska	27	"Stitches"	—	—	—	—	67%
5	Mateusz Pichal	20	"No"	—	✔	✔	—	86%
6	Ola Leśniewicz	27	"Back to Black"	✔	—	—	—	52%
7	Michał Stryczniewicz	18	"Love Yourself"	✔	✔	✔	✔	82%

=== Episode 6 (September 17, 2016) ===
Order	Artist	Age	Song	Coach's and contestant's choices				
Order	Artist	Age	Song	Tomson & Baron	Natalia	Andrzej	Maria	Homecoach App
1	Paulina Stefanowska	29	"Jej portret"	✔	✔	—	✔	52%
2	Kuba Adamus	17	"Za-czekam"	✔	✔	✔	—	79%
3	Carolin Mrugała	24	"Funhouse"	—	—	—	—	42%
4	Mateusz Grędziński	25	"Can't Feel My Face"	✔	✔	✔	✔	98%
5	Tomasz Filipczak	41	"Od dawna już wiem"	—	—	—	—	35%
6	Kamil Lampka	16	"I Know"	—	—	—	—	45%
7	Julita Trautsolt	23	"Virtual Insanity"	—	—	✔	—	50%
8	Adam Stachowiak	19	"Gravity"	✔	—	✔	—	83%

=== Episode 7 (September 24, 2016) ===
Order	Artist	Age	Song	Coach's and contestant's choices				
Order	Artist	Age	Song	Tomson & Baron	Natalia	Andrzej	Maria	Homecoach App
1	Filip Rychcik	25	"Jutro"	✔	✔	✔	✔	78%
2	Edyta Cymer	22	"Right to Be Wrong"	—	✔	—	—	51%
3	Tomasz Turek	20	"Can't Stop the Feeling!"	—	—	✔	—	32%
4	Szymon Kolber	17	"Ktoś nowy"	—	—	—	—	7%
5	Michał Podgórski	28	"Byłaś serca biciem"	—	—	—	—	7%
6	Dawid Malicki	25	"Taką wodą być"	—	—	—	—	13%
7	Justyna Gajczak	21	"Nazywam się niebo"	—	✔	✔	✔	79%
8	Tomasz Trzeszczyński	26	"Jesus He Knows Me"	✔	✔	✔	✔	100%

=== Episode 8 (September 24, 2016) ===
Order	Artist	Age	Song	Coach's and contestant's choices				
Order	Artist	Age	Song	Tomson & Baron	Natalia	Andrzej	Maria	Homecoach App
1	Patryk Wasilewski	21	"Stitches"	—	✔	✔	✔	87%
2	Zuzanna Kotecka	18	"Powerful"	—	✔	—	✔	79%
3	Paweł Pochyluk	29	"Siłacz"	—	—	—	—	25%
4	Karolina Dąbrowska	30	"Jak rzecz"	—	—	✔	✔	57%
5	Rafał Kozok	24	"A Whiter Shade of Pale"	—	—	✔	✔	83%
6	Wojciech Kiełbasa	21	"One Way or Another (Teenage Kicks)"	—	—	—	—	35%
7	Beata Spychalska	24	"When We Were Young"	✔	✔	✔	✔	96%

=== Episode 9 (October 1, 2016) ===
Order	Artist	Age	Song	Coach's and contestant's choices				
Order	Artist	Age	Song	Tomson & Baron	Natalia	Andrzej	Maria	Homecoach App
1	Maja Wojtaszek	22	"Ruchome piaski"	✔	—	—	✔	—
2	Natalia Juszczyszyn	25	"Waiting All Night"	✔	—	—	—	—
3	Oleksandr Sukhomlin	18	"Wspomnienie"	—	—	—	—	—
4	Joanna Kaczmarkiewicz	23	"Like I'm Gonna Lose You"	—	✔	✔	—	—
5	Adam Nawara	26	"Blaze of Glory"	—	—	—	—	—
6	Patrycja Koszewska	20	"Love on the Brain"	—	✔	—	✔	—
7	Sebastian Wojtczak & Daniel Rychter	32 & 26	"These Are the Days of Our Lives"	✔	✔	✔	✔	—

=== Episode 10 (October 1, 2016) ===
Order	Artist	Age	Song	Coach's and contestant's choices				
Order	Artist	Age	Song	Tomson & Baron	Natalia	Andrzej	Maria	Homecoach App
1	Sonia Stochmiałek	25	"Deeper"	—	✔	✔	✔	—
2	Gabriela Marat	16	"Skinny Love"	—	—	—	—	—
3	Piotr Kościuszko	24	"Od dawna już wiem"	—	✔	✔	—	—
4	Olga Barej	33	"I Say a Little Prayer"	—	✔	✔	✔	—
5	Violka Marcinkiewicz	22	"Opowieść"	—	—	✔	—	—
6	Kevin Caruso	19	"Riptide"	—	—	—	—	—
7	Marcelina Mróz	19	"Do kiedy jestem"	✔	✔	✔	✔	—

== The Battle Rounds ==
After the blind auditions is the battle rounds where two or three artists from each team will battle for a spot in the knockouts. New to this season, however, is the introduction of the Steal Room. This was adapted in the seventh season of The Voice of Holland.

While steals have returned, each artist that is stolen this season will sit in a designated seat in the Steal Room as they watch the other performances. If a coach has stolen one artist but later decides to steal another, the first artist will be replaced and eliminated by the newly-stolen artist. However, different from the Dutch version, each coach could steal up to three times. The battles therefore end with seven participants advancing to the next stage from each team, with six artists won in the battles and one stolen artist from other coaches' teams.

Color keys

Artist won the Battle and advances to the Knockouts
Artist lost the Battle but was stolen by another coach and advances to the Knockouts
Artist lost the Battle and was stolen by another coach, but was later switched with another artist and eliminated
Artist lost the Battle and was eliminated

Episode & Date	Coach	Order	Winner	Song	Loser	'Steal' result			
Episode & Date	Coach	Order	Winner	Song	Loser	Tomson & Baron	Natalia	Andrzej	Maria
Episode 11 (October 8)	Andrzej Piaseczny	1	Filip Rychcik	"Treasure"	Paweł Jarzynka	—	—	—N/a	—
Episode 11 (October 8)	Natalia Kukulska	2	Patryk Wasilewski	"Stay"	Edyta Cymer	✔	—N/a	—	✔
Episode 11 (October 8)	Tomson & Baron	3	Maja Wojtaszek	"W pięciu smakach"	Agata Buczkowska	—N/a	—	✔	—
Episode 11 (October 8)	Maria Sadowska	4	Mateusz Guzowski	"Lush Life"	Zuzanna Kotecka	—	—	—	—N/a
Episode 11 (October 8)	Maria Sadowska	4	Mateusz Guzowski	"Lush Life"	Sonia Stochmiałek	—	—	—	—N/a
Episode 11 (October 8)	Natalia Kukulska	5	Karolina Gefert	"Karmelove"	Piotr Kościuszko	—	—N/a	—	—
Episode 11 (October 8)	Tomson & Baron	6	Sybilla Sobczyk	"Cool Me Down"	Ola Leśniewicz	—N/a	✔	—	—
Episode 11 (October 8)	Tomson & Baron	6	Sybilla Sobczyk	"Cool Me Down"	Eva Novel	—N/a	—	—	—
Episode 11 (October 8)	Maria Sadowska	7	Monika Kitel	"W głowie"	Patrycja Koszewska	—	—	—	—N/a
Episode 11 (October 8)	Andrzej Piaseczny	8	Sami Harb	"Endless Love"	Olga Przybysz	—	—	—N/a	✔
Episode 12 (October 15)	Maria Sadowska	1	Rafał Kozok	"I'm Not the Only One"	Artur Bomert	—	—	—	—N/a
Episode 12 (October 15)	Andrzej Piaseczny	2	Ania Waszkiewicz	"I'm Every Woman"	Karolina Dąbrowska	—	—	—N/a	—
Episode 12 (October 15)	Andrzej Piaseczny	2	Ania Waszkiewicz	"I'm Every Woman"	Viola Marcinkiewicz	—	—	—N/a	—
Episode 12 (October 15)	Tomson & Baron	3	Ewelina Bogucka	"Ktoś między nami"	Adam Stachowiak	—N/a	—	—	—
Episode 12 (October 15)	Natalia Kukulska	4	Patryk Krajewski	"Walking Away"	Kuba Adamus	✔	—N/a	✔	—
Episode 12 (October 15)	Andrzej Piaseczny	5	Mateusz Pichal	"Kiedyś cię znajdę"	Julita Trautsolt	—	—	—N/a	—
Episode 12 (October 15)	Maria Sadowska	6	Katarzyna Góras	"Be the One"	Beata Romanowska	—	✔	—	—N/a
Episode 12 (October 15)	Natalia Kukulska	7	Olga Barej	"On nie kochał nas"	Joanna Kaczmarkiewicz	—	—N/a	—	—
Episode 12 (October 15)	Tomson & Baron	8	Tomasz Trzeszczyński	"Dream On"	Natalia Juszczyszyn	—N/a	—	—	—
Episode 13 (October 22)	Natalia Kukulska	1	Damian Rybicki	"(You Make Me Feel Like) A Natural Woman"	Magdalena Żaczek	—	—N/a	—	—
Episode 13 (October 22)	Natalia Kukulska	1	Damian Rybicki	"(You Make Me Feel Like) A Natural Woman"	Paulina Stefanowska	—	—N/a	—	—
Episode 13 (October 22)	Andrzej Piaseczny	2	Krzysztof Grześkiewicz	"Prosta piosenka"	Michał Stryczniewicz	—	—	—N/a	—
Episode 13 (October 22)	Maria Sadowska	3	Justyna Gajczak	"This World"	Weronika Curyło	✔	—	—	—N/a
Episode 13 (October 22)	Tomson & Baron	4	Filip Lato	"Creep"	Łukasz Bąkowski	Steal limit reached	—	✔	—
Episode 13 (October 22)	Maria Sadowska	5	Ewelina Przybyła	"Córeczko"	Beata Spychalska	Steal limit reached	—	—	—N/a
Episode 13 (October 22)	Tomson & Baron	6	Marcelina Mróz	"Part-Time Lover"	Sebastian Wojtczak & Daniel Rychter	Steal limit reached	—	—	—
Episode 13 (October 22)	Andrzej Piaseczny	7	Mateusz Grędziński	"Want to Want Me"	Tomasz Turek	Steal limit reached	—	—N/a	—
Episode 13 (October 22)	Natalia Kukulska	8	Ania Karwan	"Bang Bang"	Aga Damrych	Steal limit reached	—N/a	✔	✔

== The Knockout Round ==
=== Episode 14 (October 29, 2016) ===
Knockouts took place on 29 October 2016.

Color keys

Contestant was not switched out and advanced to the Live Shows
Contestant was eliminated, either immediately (indicated by a "—" in the "Switched with" column) or switched with another contestant

Coach	Order	Artist	Song	Result	Switched with
Maria Sadowska	1	Katarzyna Góras	"Next to Me"	Advanced	N/A
Maria Sadowska	2	Mateusz Guzowski	"Będę z Tobą"	Advanced	N/A
Maria Sadowska	3	Monika Kitel	"What's Up?"	Eliminated	N/A
Maria Sadowska	4	Ewelina Przybyła	"Good Luck"	Advanced	N/A
Maria Sadowska	5	Rafał Kozok	"Nieznajomy"	Eliminated	—
Maria Sadowska	6	Justyna Gajczak	"The Girl from Ipanema"	Eliminated	—
Maria Sadowska	7	Aga Damrych	"Hot Stuff"	Advanced	Monika Kitel
Tomson & Baron	1	Maja Wojtaszek	"I Can't Make You Love Me"	Eliminated	N/A
Tomson & Baron	2	Marcelina Mróz	"One and Only"	Advanced	N/A
Tomson & Baron	3	Filip Lato	"Shape of My Heart"	Advanced	N/A
Tomson & Baron	4	Ewelina Bogucka	"Pocałuj noc"	Eliminated	N/A
Tomson & Baron	5	Sybilla Sobczyk	"Fleciki"	Eliminated	Ewelina Bogucka
Tomson & Baron	6	Tomasz Trzeszczyński	"Niepokonani"	Advanced	Maja Wojtaszek
Tomson & Baron	7	Weronika Curyło	"Drzwi"	Advanced	Sybilla Sobczyk
Natalia Kukulska	1	Beata Romanowska	"Young and Beautiful"	Eliminated	N/A
Natalia Kukulska	2	Patryk Krajewski	"Just the Way You Are"	Eliminated	N/A
Natalia Kukulska	3	Karolina Gefert	"Trouble"	Eliminated	N/A
Natalia Kukulska	4	Ania Karwan	"Jestem kamieniem"	Advanced	N/A
Natalia Kukulska	5	Damian Rybicki	"Get Here"	Advanced	Karolina Gefert
Natalia Kukulska	6	Patryk Wasilewski	"Dla Ciebie"	Advanced	Patryk Krajewski
Natalia Kukulska	7	Olga Barej	"All About That Bass"	Advanced	Beata Romanowska
Andrzej Piaseczny	1	Łukasz Bąkowski	"Here Without You"	Advanced	N/A
Andrzej Piaseczny	2	Mateusz Pichal	"Tears in Heaven"	Eliminated	N/A
Andrzej Piaseczny	3	Sami Harb	"Have I Told You Lately"	Advanced	N/A
Andrzej Piaseczny	4	Krzysztof Grześkiewicz	"Biała flaga"	Eliminated	N/A
Andrzej Piaseczny	5	Filip Rychcik	"Streets of Philadelphia"	Eliminated	Krzysztof Grześkiewicz
Andrzej Piaseczny	6	Ania Waszkiewicz	"Tatuaż"	Advanced	Mateusz Pichal
Andrzej Piaseczny	7	Mateusz Grędziński	"Uptown Funk"	Advanced	Filip Rychcik

== Live Shows ==
Color keys

Artist was saved by Public's vote
Artist was saved by his/her coach
Artist was eliminated

=== Episode 15 (November 5, 2016) ===
Order	Coach	Artist	Song	Result
1	Tomson & Baron	Marcelina Mróz	"Promise Me"	Public vote-saved
2	Tomson & Baron	Filip Lato	"Black Hole Sun"	Eliminated
3	Tomson & Baron	Tomasz Trzeszczyński	"Thriller"	Coach vote-saved
4	Tomson & Baron	Weronika Curyło	"List do Matki"	Public vote-saved
5	Maria Sadowska	Mateusz Guzowski	"Sam na sam"	Public vote-saved
6	Maria Sadowska	Ewelina Przybyła	"Perfect Illusion"	Coach vote-saved
7	Maria Sadowska	Aga Damrych	"Error"	Eliminated
8	Maria Sadowska	Katarzyna Góras	"Without You"	Public vote-saved
9	Andrzej Piaseczny	Łukasz Bąkowski	"Hymn for the Weekend"	Public vote-saved
10	Andrzej Piaseczny	Ania Waszkiewicz	"Krakowski spleen"	Eliminated
11	Andrzej Piaseczny	Sami Harb	"Superstition"	Coach vote-saved
12	Andrzej Piaseczny	Mateusz Grędziński	"Nie mogę ci wiele dać"	Public vote-saved
13	Natalia Kukulska	Damian Rybicki	"It's Oh So Quiet"	Public vote-saved
14	Natalia Kukulska	Olga Barej	"Samba przed rozstaniem"	Eliminated
15	Natalia Kukulska	Patryk Wasilewski	"Sorry"	Coach vote-saved
16	Natalia Kukulska	Ania Karwan	"Aleja gwiazd"	Public vote-saved

Non-competition performances
Order	Performers	Song
1	Damian Ukeje	"Film"
2	Anne-Marie	"Alarm"
3	Tomson & Baron	"Musicology"
4	Maria Sadowska	"I'm Coming Out"
5	Andrzej Piaseczny	"It's Not Unusual"
6	Natalia Kukulska	"Sweet Dreams (Are Made of This)"

=== Episode 16 - Quarter-Final (November 12, 2016) ===
Order	Coach	Artist	Song	Result
1	Tomson & Baron	Marcelina Mróz	"Świat się pomylił"	Public vote-saved
2	Tomson & Baron	Tomasz Trzeszczyński	"Still Loving You"	Eliminated
3	Tomson & Baron	Weronika Curyło	"The Greatest Love of All"	Coach vote-saved
4	Maria Sadowska	Katarzyna Góras	"A to co mam"	Public vote-saved
5	Maria Sadowska	Ewelina Przybyła	"Upiłam się Tobą"	Eliminated
6	Maria Sadowska	Mateusz Guzowski	"Let Me Love You"	Coach vote-saved
7	Andrzej Piaseczny	Mateusz Grędziński	"Cake by the Ocean"	Public vote-saved
8	Andrzej Piaseczny	Łukasz Bąkowski	"Po drugiej stronie chmur"	Eliminated
9	Andrzej Piaseczny	Sami Harb	"Un-Break My Heart"	Coach vote-saved
10	Natalia Kukulska	Ania Karwan	"Sex on Fire"	Public vote-saved
11	Natalia Kukulska	Patryk Wasilewski	"W dobrą stronę"	Eliminated
12	Natalia Kukulska	Damian Rybicki	"Déjà Vu"	Coach vote-saved

Non-competition performances
Order	Performers	Song
1	BeMy	"Oxygen"
2	Natalia Sikora	"Buried Alive in the Blues"
3	Andrzej Piaseczny	"Kołysanka dla Okruszka"
4	Natalia Kukulska	"Zielono mi"
5	Tomson & Baron	"Cyrk nocą"
6	Maria Sadowska	"Polska Madonna"

=== Episode 17 - Semi-Final (November 19, 2016) ===
Summary of points
Order	Coach	Artist	Song	Coach's	Public's	Total	Result
1	Maria Sadowska	Katarzyna Góras	"Alive"	60.00%	65.00%	125.00%	Advanced the Final
2	Maria Sadowska	Mateusz Guzowski	"Thinking Out Loud"	40.00%	35.00%	75.00%	Eliminated
3	Andrzej Piaseczny	Mateusz Grędziński	"Miałeś być"	70.00%	64.00%	134.00%	Advanced the Final
4	Andrzej Piaseczny	Sami Harb	"Skyfall"	30.00%	36.00%	66.00%	Eliminated
5	Natalia Kukulska	Ania Karwan	"Say You Love Me"	60.00%	72.00%	132.00%	Advanced the Final
6	Natalia Kukulska	Damian Rybicki	"Tak... tak... to ja..."	40.00%	28.00%	68.00%	Eliminated
7	Tomson & Baron	Weronika Curyło	"Sen o Victorii"	55.00%	69.00%	124.00%	Advanced the Final
8	Tomson & Baron	Marcelina Mróz	"Listen"	45.00%	31.00%	76.00%	Eliminated

Songs performed a duet
Order	Coach	Performers	Song
1	Maria Sadowska	Katarzyna Góras i Mateusz Guzowski	"Zakochani są wśród nas"
2	Andrzej Piaseczny	Sami Harb i Mateusz Grędziński	„Come and Get It”
3	Natalia Kukulska	Anna Karwan i Damian Rybicki	„You're the One That I Want”
4	Tomson & Baron	Marcelina Mróz i Weronika Curyło	„Waterfalls”

Non-competition performances
Order	Performers	Song
1	Kungs	„This Girl”/„Don't You Know”
2	Mateusz Ziółko	„W płomieniach”
3	Patrycja Markowska	„Ocean”

=== Episode 18 - Final (November 26, 2016) ===
Result details

- Winner
- Runner-up
- Third place
- Fourth Place

Order	Coach	Performers	Song		Finals
1.	Tomson & Baron	Weronika Curyło	Solo song	Hero	Runner-up
1.	Tomson & Baron	Weronika Curyło	Duet with Guest Artist	Tonight with Kayah	Runner-up
1.	Tomson & Baron	Weronika Curyło	Duet with coach	With a Little Help from My Friends	Runner-up
1.	Tomson & Baron	Weronika Curyło	Finalist's song	Zawołaj	Runner-up
2.	Natalia Kukulska	Ania Karwan	Solo song	Tomorrow Never Dies	Third place
2.	Natalia Kukulska	Ania Karwan	Duet with Guest Artist	Man In The Mirror with Jakub Badach	Third place
2.	Natalia Kukulska	Ania Karwan	Duet with coach	A Woman’s Worth	Third place
2.	Natalia Kukulska	Ania Karwan	Finalist's song		Third place
3.	Andrzej Piaseczny	Mateusz Grędziński	Solo song	Can't Stop The Feeling!	Winner
3.	Andrzej Piaseczny	Mateusz Grędziński	Duet with Guest Artist	Just the Two of Us with Margaret	Winner
3.	Andrzej Piaseczny	Mateusz Grędziński	Duet with coach	Podaruj mi trochę słońca	Winner
3.	Andrzej Piaseczny	Mateusz Grędziński	Finalist's song	Obietnice	Winner
4.	Maria Sadowska	Katarzyna Góras	Solo song	To nie ja!	Fourth Place
4.	Maria Sadowska	Katarzyna Góras	Duet with Guest Artist	Endless Love with Grzegorz Skawiński	Fourth Place
4.	Maria Sadowska	Katarzyna Góras	Duet with coach	I Wanna Dance with Somebody	Fourth Place
4.	Maria Sadowska	Katarzyna Góras	Finalist's song		Fourth Place

Non-competition performances
Order	Performers	Song
1	Agnieszka Twardowska	Zwyczajni
2	Kortez	Wracaj do domu
3	Natalia Nykiel	Pół dziewczyna

== Results summary of live shows ==
Color keys
Artist's info

- Artist from Team Tomson & Baron
- Artist from Team Maria Sadowska
- Artist from Team Natalia Kukulska
- Artist from Team Andrzej Piaseczny

Result details

- Artist was proclaimed as winner
- Artist was proclaimed as runner-up
- Artist was proclaimed as third place
- Artist was proclaimed as fourth place
- Artist advanced to the finals
- Artist was saved by his/her coach
- Artist was saved by the public
- Artist received the fewest accumulated total points and was eliminated
- Artist received the fewest of the public's vote and was eliminated

Live show results per week
Artist	Week 1	Week 2	Week 3	Finals
Mateusz Grędziński	Safe	Safe	Advanced	Winner
Weronika Curyło	Safe	Safe	Advanced	Runner-up
Ania Karwan	Safe	Safe	Advanced	3rd Place
Katarzyna Góras	Safe	Safe	Advanced	4th Place
Damian Rybicki	Safe	Safe	Eliminated	Eliminated (Week 3)
Sami Harb	Safe	Safe	Eliminated	Eliminated (Week 3)
Mateusz Guzowski	Safe	Safe	Eliminated	Eliminated (Week 3)
Marcelina Mróz	Safe	Safe	Eliminated	Eliminated (Week 3)
Patryk Wasilewski	Safe	Eliminated	Eliminated (Week 2)	
Łukasz Bąkowski	Safe	Eliminated	Eliminated (Week 2)	
Ewelina Przybyła	Safe	Eliminated	Eliminated (Week 2)	
Tomasz Trzeszczyński	Safe	Eliminated	Eliminated (Week 2)	
Olga Barej	Eliminated	Eliminated (Week 1)		
Ania Waszkiewicz	Eliminated	Eliminated (Week 1)		
Aga Damrych	Eliminated	Eliminated (Week 1)		
Filip Lato	Eliminated	Eliminated (Week 1)		

=== Team ===
Artist's info

- Artist from Team Tomson & Baron
- Artist from Team Maria Sadowska
- Artist from Team Natalia Kukulska
- Artist from Team Andrzej Piaseczny

Result details

- Winner
- Runner-up
- Third place
- Fourth Place
- Artist advanced to the finals
- Artist was saved by his/her coach
- Artist was saved by public
- Artist was eliminated

Live show results per week
Artist	Live Shows			
Artist	Week 1	Week 2	Week 3	Finals
Mateusz Grędziński	Public's vote	Public's vote	Advanced Finals	Winner
Sami Harb	Coach's choice	Coach's choice	Eliminated	
Łukasz Bąkowski	Public's vote	Eliminated		
Ania Waszkiewicz	Eliminated			
Weronika Curyło	Public's vote	Coach's choice	Advanced Finals	Runner-up
Marcelina Mróz	Public's vote	Public's vote	Eliminated	
Tomasz Trzeszczyński	Coach's choice	Eliminated		
Filip Lato	Eliminated			
Ania Karwan	Public's vote	Public's vote	Advanced Finals	3rd Place
Damian Rybicki	Public's vote	Coach's choice	Eliminated	
Patryk Wasilewski	Coach's choice	Eliminated		
Olga Barej	Eliminated			
Katarzyna Góras	Public's vote	Public's vote	Advanced Finals	4th Place
Mateusz Guzowski	Public's vote	Coach's choice	Eliminated	
Ewelina Przybyła	Coach's choice	Eliminated		
Aga Damrych	Eliminated			
