= Dancemania 5 =

Compilation album by various artists
- Released: April 28, 1997
- Genre: Electronic, Pop (House, Euro house, synthpop)
- Length: 68:00
- Label: EMI Music Japan
- Producer: Masaaki Saito (executive producer); Hitoshi Namekata (producer)

Dancemania chronology
4 (1997)	Dancemania 5 (1997)	6 (1997)

Dancemania 5 is the fifth set in the Dancemania series of dance music compilation albums, released in 1997 by EMI Music Japan.

The album debuted at #16 on Oricon's weekly album chart in May 1997 and reached #5 the next week, appearing on the yearly best-selling album chart at #98 in 1997 with 227,310 copies sold, along with its predecessor, 4, which ranked #92.

== Tracks ==
#	Track	By	Ref
1	Together and Forever	Captain Jack	
2	Ring a Ling	Tiggy	
3	Freedom	DJ BoBo	
4	Midnight	Fargetta	
5	I Was Born to Love You	Worlds Apart	
6	Physical	The Olivia Project feat. Paula	
7	Dancing Queen	Abbacadabra	
8	Ai no Corrida	Lisa Milton	
9	Cyber Queen	Sister Queen with Richard Clayderman	
10	Europa Europa	Intense	
11	Let Me Be Free	Samantha Fox	
12	Power of Music	BC Dance	
13	Day By Day	100th Debut	
14	Layla	Chica	
15	Light My Fire	Nausikaa	
16	Charlene	Missing Heart	
17	Sexuality (I Feel So Young)	Claudja	
18	Independent Love Song	Bombers	
19	Share a Piece of Your Heart	Concept of Sound	
20	Super Super Hero	Fireman	
21	Sun Always Shines on TV	Interactive	
22	I'm Not in Love	Megababe	

== Further details ==
Intro with #1 "Together and Forever"
The non-stop mixing was done by the Italian DJ introduced as the "No.1 DJ of Italy" on the booklet, Fargetta.

The album's overall average tempo is 142 bpm;

The slowest track is "Cyber Queen" (#9) at 130 bpm.
The fastest track is "I'm Not in Love" (#22) at 185 bpm.

The album contains 9 covers or remixes.

#5 "I Was Born to Love You" is a cover of Queen's "I Was Born to Love You".
#6 "Physical" is a cover of Olivia Newton-John's "Physical".
#7 "Dancing Queen" is a cover of ABBA's "Dancing Queen".
#8 "Ai no Corrida" is a cover of Quincy Jones' "Ai no Corrida".
#9 "Cyber Queen" sampled Richard Clayderman's "Ballade pour Adeline".
#14 "Layla" is a cover of Derek & The Dominos' "Layla", sampling Catch 22's "Boogie Town" and LL Cool J's "It Gets No Rougher".
#18 "Independent Love Song" is a cover of Scarlet's "Independent Love Song".
#21 "Sun Always Shines on TV" is a cover of a-ha's "The Sun Always Shines on T.V.".
#22 "I'm Not in Love" is a cover of 10cc's "I'm Not in Love".

Several tracks on the album, including different remixes, can also be found on other Dancemania albums such as 9, X4, X9, Delux 2, Delux 4, Extra, Diamond, Diamond Complete Edition, Zip Mania, Zip Mania II, Zip Mania Best, Speed 1, Happy Paradise, Happy Paradise 2, Bass #1, Best Red, Club the Earth II or Disco Groove.

#	Track	Length	BPM	Ref	Artist(s)	From / based in	Ref
1	Together and Forever	3:14	150		Captain Jack	Germany	
2	Ring a Ling	3:27	136		Tiggy	Denmark	
3	Freedom	3:02	140		DJ BoBo	Switzerland	
4	Midnight	2:25	135		Fargetta	Italy	
5	I Was Born to Love You	2:55	135		Worlds Apart	Germany / (United Kingdom) UK	
6	Physical	3:13	136		The Olivia Project feat. Paula	Australia	
7	Dancing Queen	2:40	132		Abbacadabra	United Kingdom	
8	Ai no Corrida	2:32	132		Lisa Milton	United Kingdom	
9	Cyber Queen	2:51	130		Sister Queen with Richard Clayderman	France	
10	Europa Europa	3:19	132		Intense	Unknown	—
11	Let Me Be Free	2:32	132		Samantha Fox	United Kingdom	
12	Power of Music	3:37	136		BC Dance	South Africa	
13	Day By Day	3:14	138		100th Debut	Latvia	
14	Layla	2:57	138		Chica	United Kingdom	
15	Light My Fire	3:32	138		Nausikaa	Italy	
16	Charlene	3:13	148		Missing Heart	Germany	
17	Sexuality (I Feel So Young)	4:06	147		Claudja	Italy	
18	Independent Love Song	2:53	148		Bombers	Spain	
19	Share a Piece of Your Heart	3:19	148		Concept of Sound	Sweden	
20	Super Super Hero	3:20	160		Fireman	Italy	
21	Sun Always Shines on TV	2:38	159		Interactive	Germany	
22	I'm Not in Love	3:08	185		Megababe	Germany	
