= Dancemania 8 =

Compilation album by various artists
- Released: January 16, 1998
- Genres: Electronic (Euro house, happy hardcore, Italo dance)
- Length: 74:00
- Label: EMI Music Japan
- Producers: Masaaki Saito (executive producer); Hiro Kadoma (producer)

Dancemania chronology
7 (1997)	Dancemania 8 (1998)	9 (1998)

Dancemania 8 is the eighth set in the Dancemania series of dance music compilation albums, released in 1998 by EMI Music Japan.

The album debuted at #9 on Oricon's weekly album chart in January 1998 and remained within the top 20 positions on the chart for 4 consecutive weeks, peaking at #8.

The non-stop mixing was completed by Felix Gauder, a popular producer from Europe.

== Tracks ==
#	Track	By	Ref
1	Samba De Janeiro	Bellini	
2	Latin Lover	Popsie	
3	Stay	Mizz Maya	
4	Hot Hot Hot	Splash	
5	Wham Bam (Shang-A-Lang)	The Scarlet	
6	All I Do	XXL	
7	Let Me Feel the Love	DJ BoBo	
8	Love Sensation	911	
9	Rise Like the Sun	Worlds Apart	
10	Angel Eyes	E-Rotic	
11	Gotta Get It Groovin'	E-Rotic	
12	Give Me Tomorrow	Peach	
13	Shine Like a Star	Berri	
14	Maybe Baby	Marysia	
15	Hero	Papaya	
16	No Way No Way	Vanilla	
17	Faith in Love	Bug!	
18	You Never Know	Sandi	
19	Sweet Dreams	Sharon C.	
20	Let Me Be Your Girl	Fact Or Fiction	
21	Go-Just Get It	The Lovers	
22	Why Don't You	Pixie	
23	Sentimental Dreaming	Jesa X	
24	Voyager Girl	Space Nina	

== Further details ==
Intro and #1 "Samba De Janeiro"
"Samba De Janeiro" was one of the greatest hits in the all-European "latin boom" occurred in the summer of 1997.

Outro and #24 "Voyager Girl"
Voyager Girl was produced by popular Swiss producer team Trilogy and was the debut single by Space Nina, a singer credited simply as Nina in Switzerland.

The album's full length is 74:00. The longest track is "Samba De Janeiro" (#1) at 4:05. The shortest track is "Give Me Tomorrow" (#12) at 2:08.

The album's overall average tempo is 137 bpm; The slowest track is "Stay" (#3) at 124 bpm. The fastest track is "Voyager Girl" (#24) at 160 bpm.

Several tracks are cover versions or remix versions:

- #1 "Samba De Janeiro" is a remix / cover version of Airto Moreira's "Tombo".
- #3 "Stay" is a cover version of Maurice Williams and the Zodiacs' "Stay".
- #4 "Hot Hot Hot" is a remix / cover version of Arrow's "Hot Hot Hot".
- #5 "Wham Bam (Shang-A-Lang)" is a dance cover version of Silver's "Wham Bam".
- #6 "All I Do" is a cover version of Stevie Wonder's "All I Do".
- #10 "Angel Eyes" is a cover version of ABBA's "Angeleyes".
- #16 "No Way No Way" is a cover version of "Mah Nà Mah Nà".
- #19 "Sweet Dreams" is a cover version of Eurythmics' "Sweet Dreams".

Several tracks on the album, including different remixes, can also be found on other Dancemania albums such as Summers, Summers 3, Delux 2, Delux 3, Extra, Diamond, Diamond Complete Edition, Best Red, Zip Mania, Zip Mania II, Zip Mania 02, Zip Mania Best, Club The Earth, Sports, Speed 1, Speed 4, Speed 8, Speed Best 2001, Happy Paradise, Bass #1, Bass #6, Bass 9, Bass 10 Super Best 2001 or EX 8.

#	Track	Length	BPM	Ref	Artist(s)	From or based in	Ref
1	Samba De Janeiro	4:05	133		Bellini	Germany	
2	Latin Lover	2:43	126		Popsie	Sweden	
3	Stay	2:40	124		Mizz Maya	Denmark	
4	Hot Hot Hot	2:43	128		Splash	United Kingdom	
5	Wham Bam (Shang-A-Lang)	3:12	132		The Scarlet	Unknown	—
6	All I Do	2:56	131		XXL	Germany	
7	Let Me Feel the Love	2:27	130		DJ BoBo	Switzerland	
8	Love Sensation	3:20	128		911	United Kingdom	
9	Rise Like the Sun	3:12	135		Worlds Apart	Germany / (United Kingdom) UK	
10	Angel Eyes	3:34	134		E-Rotic	Germany	
11	Gotta Get It Groovin'	3:18	140		E-Rotic	Germany	
12	Give Me Tomorrow	2:08	140		Peach	United Kingdom	
13	Shine Like a Star	3:25	137		Berri	United Kingdom	
14	Maybe Baby	3:11	138		Marysia	Poland	
15	Hero	3:26	138		Papaya	Denmark	
16	No Way No Way	3:01	131		Vanilla	United Kingdom	
17	Faith in Love	3:16	133		Bug!	Canada	
18	You Never Know	3:23	143		Sandi	Hungary	
19	Sweet Dreams	3:05	140		Sharon C.	Croatia / Italy	
20	Let Me Be Your Girl	2:58	139		Fact Or Fiction	Canada	
21	Go-Just Get It	3:34	142		The Lovers	Switzerland	
22	Why Don't You	2:38	151		Pixie	Germany	
23	Sentimental Dreaming	3:25	159		Jesa X	Italy	
24	Voyager Girl	3:03	160		Space Nina	Switzerland	
