= Dancemania 2 =

Compilation album by various artists
- Released: July 17, 1996
- Genres: Electronic (Euro house, Happy hardcore)
- Length: 68:00
- Label: EMI Music Japan
- Producers: Masaaki Saito (executive producer); Hitoshi Namekata (producer)

Dancemania chronology
1 (1996)	Dancemania 2 (1996)	3 (1996)

Dancemania 2 is the second set in the Dancemania series of dance music compilation albums, released in 1996 by EMI Music Japan.

The megamix album was mixed by Bob Salton, a popular DJ from Italy, and debuted at #11 on Oricon's weekly album chart in July 1996.

== Tracks ==
#	Track	By	Ref
1	Nightfever	Ex-It	
2	Good Times	Blaxone	
3	Fresh	Beat System	
4	Ring My Bell	Black Nero	
5	Captain Jack	Captain Jack	
6	Drill Instructor	Captain Jack	
7	Lion Eddie	Me & My	
8	Max Don't Have Sex With Your Ex	E-Rotic	
9	Shame	Basic Element	
10	Upside Down	Cut 'N' Move	
11	Climb Any Mountain	Melodie MC	
12	Dance With Me	Voice	
13	Energy of Light	Magic Affair	
14	Love Child	Mylin Brooks	
15	Mr. Fantasy	Fantasy	
16	Feel The Night	Look Twice	
17	Another Dream	Claudja	
18	Believe in Fireman	Fireman	
19	Paradise	C.O.R. feat. Mike Nova	
20	Rainbow To The Stars	Dune	

== Further details ==
The ending : #20 Rainbow To The Stars

The album's overall average tempo is 142 bpm;

The slowest track is "Nightfever" (#1) at 110 bpm.
The fastest track is "Rainbow To The Stars" (#20) at 181 bpm.

Several tracks are cover versions or remix versions.

#1 "Nightfever" is a cover version of Bee Gees' "Night Fever".
#2 "Good Times" is a remix / cover version of Chic's "Good Times".
#3 "Fresh" is a remix / cover version of Kool & The Gang's "Fresh".
#4 "Ring My Bell" is a cover version of Anita Ward's "Ring My Bell".
#10 "Upside Down" is a remix / cover version of Diana Ross' "Upside Down".

Several tracks on the album, including different remixes, can also be found on other Dancemania albums such as 1, Delux, Hyper Delux, Extra, EX1, Zip Mania 1, Zip Mania II, Summers, Summers 2001, Bass #1, Bass #10, Best Red, Speed 2, Speed 3, Speed 9, Speed Best 2001 or Speed G.

#	Track	Length	BPM	Ref	Artist(s)	From / based in	Ref
1	Nightfever	4:08	110		Ex-It	Germany	
2	Good Times	3:51	112		Blaxone	Germany	
3	Fresh	3:29	116		Beat System	Germany	
4	Ring My Bell	4:05	124		Black Nero	Germany	
5	Captain Jack	3:06	150		Captain Jack	Germany	
6	Drill Instructor	2:59	150		Captain Jack	Germany	
7	Lion Eddie	3:41	136		Me & My	Denmark	
8	Max Don't Have Sex With Your Ex	3:22	140		E-Rotic	Germany	
9	Shame	3:19	130		Basic Element	Sweden	
10	Upside Down	3:45	135		Cut 'N' Move	Denmark	
11	Climb Any Mountain	3:16	137		Melodie MC	Sweden	
12	Dance With Me	3:15	140		Voice	Germany	
13	Energy of Light	3:20	145		Magic Affair	Germany	
14	Love Child	3:08	145		Mylin Brooks	(United States) USA / Japan	
15	Mr. Fantasy	3:30	150		Fantasy	Unknown	—
16	Feel The Night	3:35	153		Look Twice	Sweden	
17	Another Dream	2:01	160		Claudja	Italy	
18	Believe in Fireman	2:58	160		Fireman	Italy	
19	Paradise	3:23	164		C.O.R. feat. Mike Nova	Germany	
20	Rainbow To The Stars	4:22	181		Dune	Germany	
