= The Voice of Poland season 6 =

The Voice of Poland
- Season 6
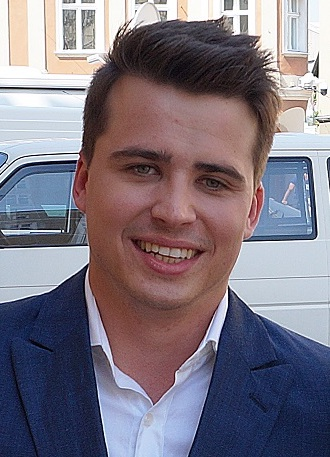
- Hosted by: Tomasz Kammel; Halina Mlynkova; Maciej Musiał
- Judges: Tomson & Baron; Maria Sadowska; Edyta Górniak; Andrzej Piaseczny
- Winner: Krzysztof Iwaneczko
- Runner-up: Tobiasz Staniszewski

Release
- Original network: TVP2
- Original release: September 5 – November 28, 2015

Season chronology
- ← Previous; Season 5 Next → Season 7

The sixth season of The Voice of Poland began airing 5 September 2015 on TVP 2. It aired on Saturdays at 20:05 and 21:10.

Tomson & Baron and Edyta Górniak are coaches for the sixth edition. By contrast, Maria Sadowska and Andrzej Piaseczny replace Justyna Steczkowska and Marek Piekarczyk who resigned as judges for professional reasons. Tomasz Kammel and Maciej Musiał return as hosts to the sixth edition. Halina Mlynkova replaced Magdalena Mielcarz who resigned for professional reasons.

== Coaches ==
Tomson & Baron and Edyta Górniak return as coaches for the 6th edition. By contrast, Maria Sadowska and Andrzej Piaseczny replace the role of jurors Justyna Steczkowska and Marek Piekarczyk, who resigned from the post of judges in a professional capacity. Moderators Tomasz Kammel and Maciej Musiał are joined by Halina Mlynkova, who replaced Magdalena Mielcarz. Remigiusz Jakub Wierzgoń a.k.a. "ReZigiusz" joins the "V-reporter" Marta Siurnik to tour the world of the Internet and look behind the scenes at "The Voice of Poland".

Coaches and Hosts gallery

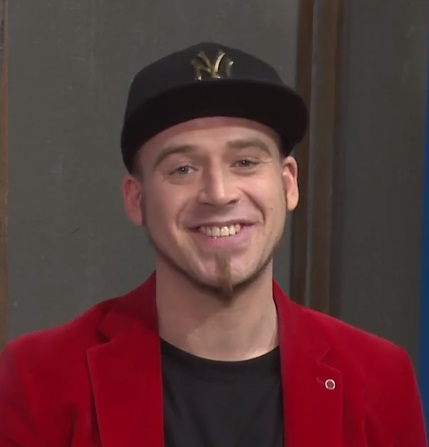
Tomasz Lach (duo)

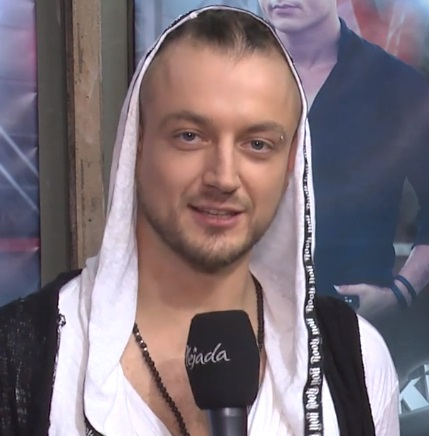
Aleksandr Milwiw-Baron (duo)

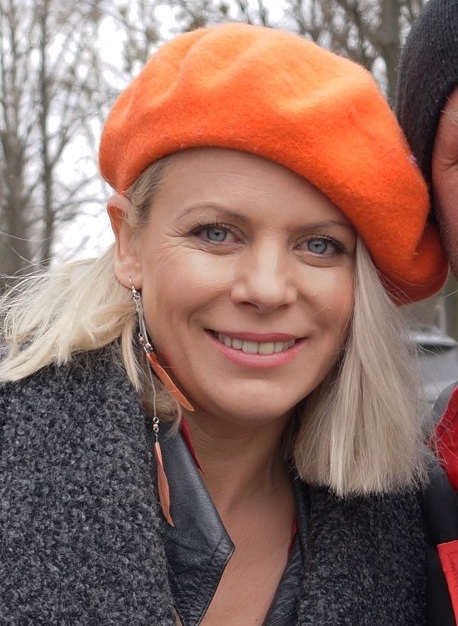
Maria Sadowska

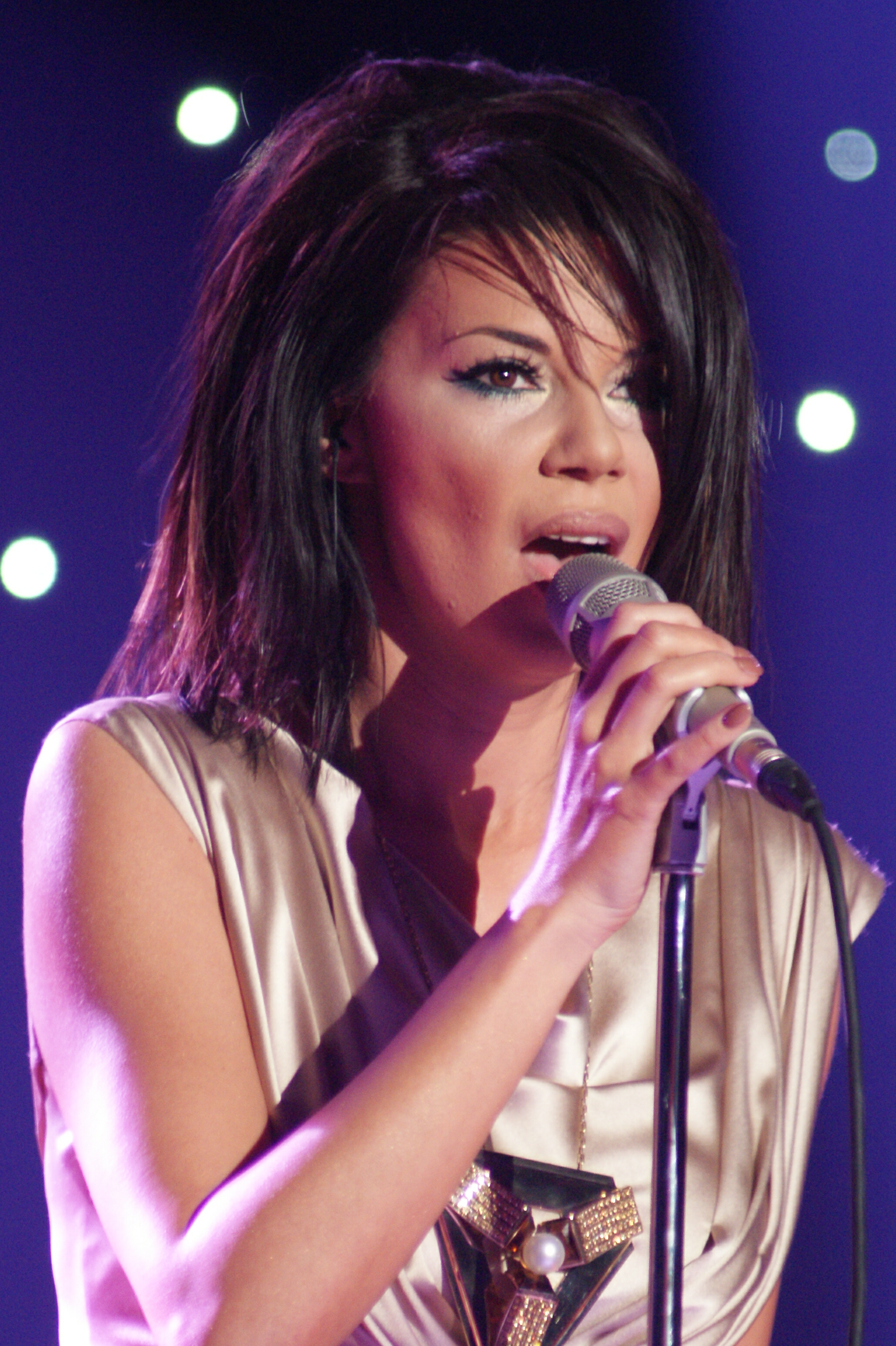
Edyta Górniak

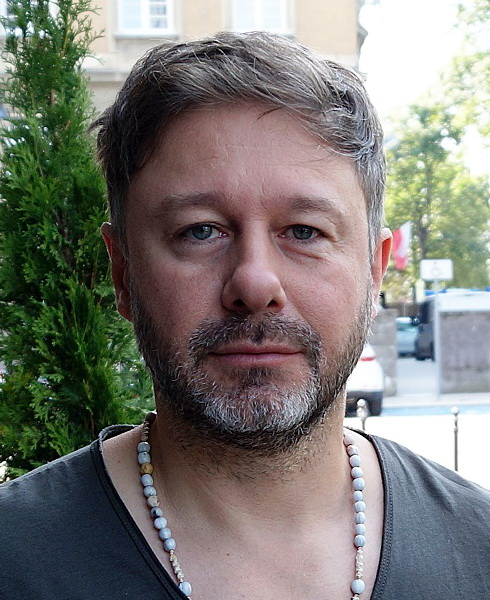
Andrzej Piaseczny

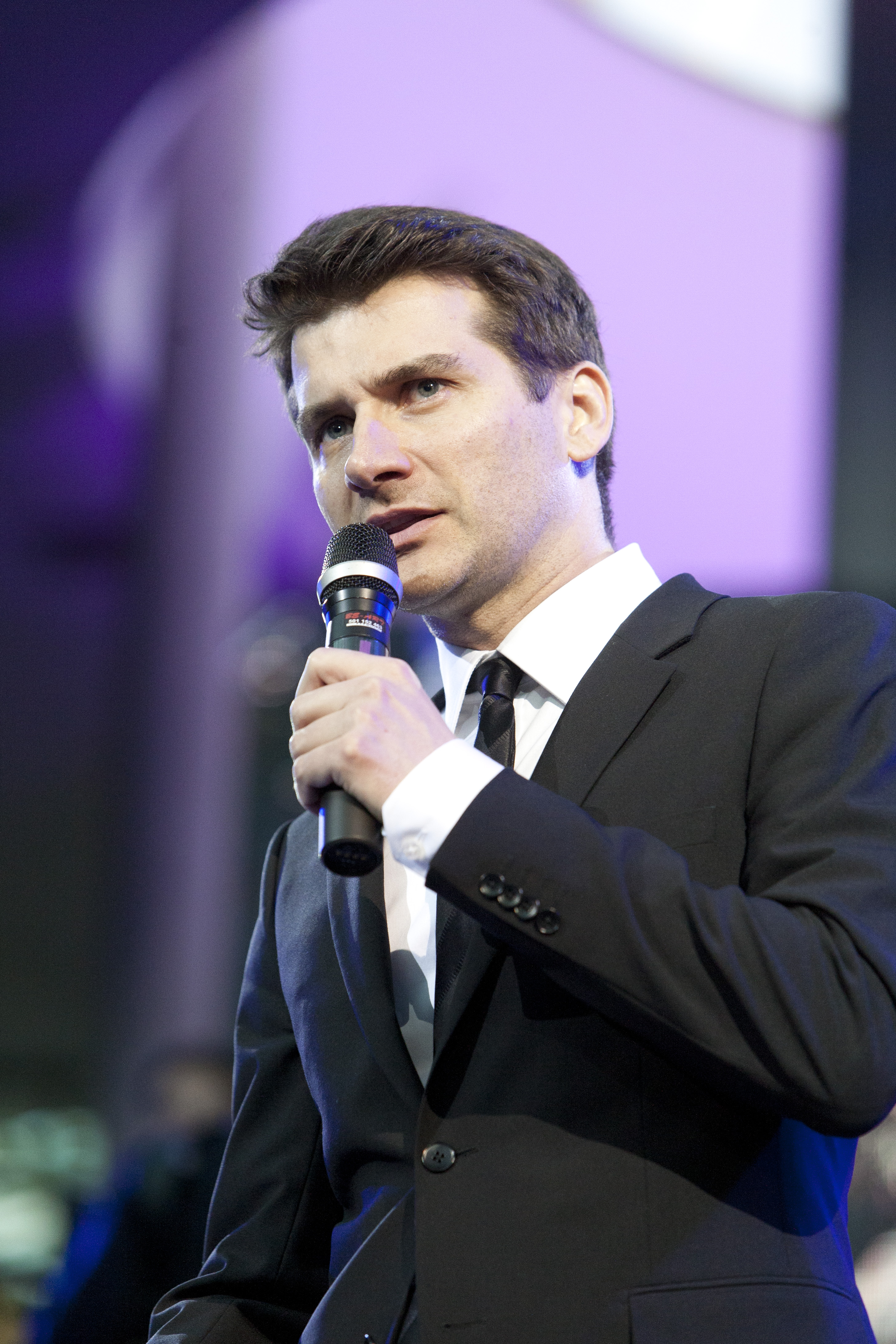
Tomasz Kammel

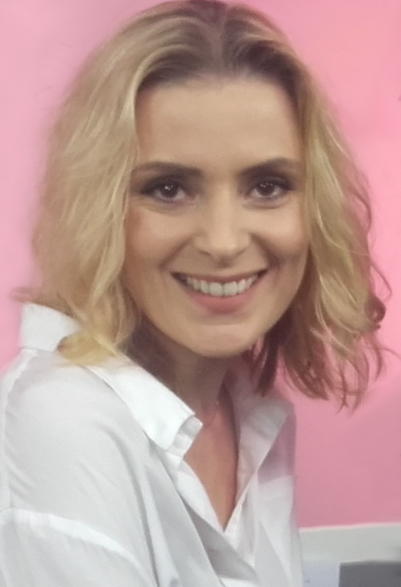
Halina Mlynkova

== Teams ==
Color key

- Winner
- Runner-up
- Third place
- Fourth place
- Eliminated in the Semifinals
- Eliminated in the Quarterfinals
- Eliminated in the Live round
- Eliminated in the Knockout round
- Artist was stolen by another coach (Name is strikethroughed)
- Eliminated in the Battle rounds

Coaches	Top 57 artists				
Tomson & Baron					
Tomson & Baron	Tobiasz Staniszewski	Julia & Jędrzej Skibowie	Anna Kłys	Patryk Glinka	Marta Moszczyńska
Tomson & Baron	Klaudia Duda	Sara Girgis	Łukasz Muszyński	Paweł Tymiński	Andrzej Mrozek
Tomson & Baron	Renata Tuszyńska	Joanna Reczyńska	Paweł Ceberek	Michalina Stokowy	~~Maciej Grenda~~
Tomson & Baron	~~Asteya Dec~~				
Maria Sadowska					
Maria Sadowska	Krzysztof Iwaneczko	Katarzyna Malenda	Patryk Skoczyński	Asteya Dec	Sabina Nycek
Maria Sadowska	Fabian Kowolik	Ewa Lewandowska-Ekwa	Michał Retelewski	Natalia Kowalska	Anastazja Roskacz
Maria Sadowska	Aleksandra Szumińska	Łukasz Wicenciak	Weronika Lewandowska	Agata Geisler	~~Piotr Tłustochowicz~~
Maria Sadowska	~~Aleksandra Turoń~~				
Edyta Górniak					
Edyta Górniak	Ana Andrzejewska	Julia Bogdańska	Katarzyna Miśkowiec	Daniel Cebula-Orynicz	Marcin Czyżewski
Edyta Górniak	Natalia Świerczyńska-Adamczak	Michał Krawczyk	Adrian Wojtków	Aleksandra Turoń	Ewelina Łuszczek
Edyta Górniak	Małgorzata Bernatowicz	Emilia Dębska	Alicja Westerlich	Łukasz Kledzik	Michał Gieczewski
Edyta Górniak	~~Paweł Tymiński~~	~~Sara Girgis~~			
Andrzej Piaseczny					
Andrzej Piaseczny	William Prestigiacomo	Maciej Grenda	Piotr Tłustochowicz	Karolina Leszko	Krzysztof Bobecki
Andrzej Piaseczny	Hubert Szczęsny	Marcin Staszek	Paula Kucharska	Agnieszka Birecka	Bartosz Staniszewski
Andrzej Piaseczny	Paloma Lokus	Piotr 'Elton' Waskowski	Agnieszka Bardoń	Paweł Szutta	~~Natalia Kowalska~~
Andrzej Piaseczny	~~Michał Krawczyk~~				

== Blind auditions ==
Color keys

✔	Coach hit his/her "I WANT YOU" button
	Artist defaulted to this coach's team
	Artist elected to join this coach's team
	Artist eliminated with no coach pressing his or her "I WANT YOU" button

=== Episode 1 (September 5, 2015) ===
Order	Artist	Age	Song	Coach's and contestant's choices			
Order	Artist	Age	Song	Tomson & Baron	Maria	Edyta	Andrzej
1	Michał Retelewski	23	Wake Me Up Before You Go-Go	✔	✔	✔	—
2	Asteya Dec	29	Ghost	✔	✔	✔	✔
3	Łukasz Kledzik	23	Geronimo	✔	✔	✔	✔
4	Jakub Krystyan	22	Jak na lotni	—	—	—	—
5	Tobiasz Staniszewski	35	Crazy	✔	✔	✔	—
6	Weronika Lewandowska	19	Prayer in C	✔	✔	—	—
7	Karolina Miziołek	16	I'm Not the Only One	—	—	—	—

=== Episode 2 (September 5, 2015) ===
Order	Artist	Age	Song	Coach's and contestant's choices			
Order	Artist	Age	Song	Tomson & Baron	Maria	Edyta	Andrzej
1	Ana Andrzejewska	22	Love Me Like You Do	✔	✔	✔	✔
2	Jakub Nowakowski	26	Here Without You	—	—	—	—
3	Maciej Grenda	27	Stolen Dance	✔	✔	✔	✔
4	Ewelina Łuszczek	23	Noc po ciężkim dniu	—	—	✔	—
5	Albert Prządka	26	Pretty Woman	—	—	—	—
6	Marcin Czyżewski	39	Take Me to Church	✔	—	✔	✔
7	Misza Czerniak	31	Z tobą chcę oglądać świat	—	—	—	—
8	Sabina Nycek	25	If I Go	—	✔	—	✔

=== Episode 3 (September 12, 2015) ===
Order	Artist	Age	Song	Coach's and contestant's choices			
Order	Artist	Age	Song	Tomson & Baron	Maria	Edyta	Andrzej
1	Katarzyna Malenda	28	Kocham cię kochanie moje	—	✔	✔	✔
2	Krzysztof Bobecki	23	Thinking Out Loud	✔	—	—	✔
3	Katarzyna Miśkowiec	24	If I Go	—	—	✔	✔
4	Viola Sobczyk	25	All About That Bass	—	—	—	—
5	Patryk Glinka	25	Policeman	✔	✔	—	✔
6	Grzegorz Pacho	39	Have You Ever Seen the Rain?	—	—	—	—
7	Karolina Leszko	29	Get Here	✔	✔	✔	✔

=== Episode 4 (September 12, 2015) ===
Order	Artist	Age	Song	Coach's and contestant's choices			
Order	Artist	Age	Song	Tomson & Baron	Maria	Edyta	Andrzej
1	Agata Geisler	25	Nah Neh Nah	—	✔	—	✔
2	Julia & Jędrzej Skibowie	28 & 19	Billie Jean	✔	✔	—	✔
3	Fabian Kowolik	21	Wherever You Will Go	—	✔	—	✔
4	Magdalena Fidecka	21	Anything Could Happen	—	—	—	—
5	Patryk Skoczyński	19	Riptide	—	✔	—	✔
6	Joanna Reczyńska	20	I Can't Make You Love Me	✔	—	—	✔
7	Krzysztof Iwaneczko	20	Nieznajomy	✔	✔	✔	✔

=== Episode 5 (September 19, 2015) ===
Order	Artist	Age	Song	Coach's and contestant's choices			
Order	Artist	Age	Song	Tomson & Baron	Maria	Edyta	Andrzej
1	Paweł Ceberek	29	Chain Of Fools	✔	—	—	✔
2	Hubert Szczęsny	25	Wherever You Will Go	—	—	—	✔
3	Agnieszka Birecka	25	How Deep Is Your Love	✔	✔	✔	✔
4	Łukasz Muszyński	26	Jak nie my to kto	✔	—	✔	✔
5	Eric Folly	36	Wake Me Up Before You Go-Go	—	—	—	—
6	Sebastian Lechner	35	American Pie	—	—	—	—
7	Agnieszka Bardoń	20	Prayer in C	—	—	—	✔
8	Paweł Tymiński	38	O sobie samym	✔	✔	✔	—

=== Episode 6 (September 19, 2015) ===
Order	Artist	Age	Song	Coach's and contestant's choices			
Order	Artist	Age	Song	Tomson & Baron	Maria	Edyta	Andrzej
1	Renata Tuszyńska	22	Wish I Didn't Miss You	✔	—	✔	✔
2	Paweł Szutta	33	The Scientist	—	—	—	✔
3	Paloma Lokus	18	Stay	—	✔	✔	✔
4	Paweł Kwaśny	26	Syreny	—	—	—	—
5	Emilia Dębska	25	Suddenly I See	✔	✔	✔	✔
6	Monika Rygasiewicz	18	Everybody Hurts	—	—	—	—
7	Adela Konop	23	When You Say Nothing At All	—	—	—	—
8	Dorota Michałowska	23	Love Fool	—	—	—	—
9	Julia Bogdańska	16	The Power Of Love	—	✔	✔	✔

=== Episode 7 (September 26, 2015) ===
Order	Artist	Age	Song	Coach's and contestant's choices			
Order	Artist	Age	Song	Tomson & Baron	Maria	Edyta	Andrzej
1	Klaudia Duda	18	All About That Bass	✔	✔	—	✔
2	Anna Krystek-Sarnecka	29	Teksański	—	—	—	—
3	Andrzej Mrozek	17	Stolen Dance	✔	—	—	✔
4	Michał Krawczyk	19	When You Say Nothing At All	—	—	—	✔
5	Aleksandra Turoń	26	Miód	✔	✔	✔	✔
6	Piotr Tłustochowicz	21	All of Me	✔	✔	✔	✔
7	Ada Kiepura	22	To Nie Ptak	—	—	—	—
8	Daniel Cebula-Orynicz	22	Another Love	—	—	✔	✔

=== Episode 8 (September 26, 2015) ===
Order	Artist	Age	Song	Coach's and contestant's choices			
Order	Artist	Age	Song	Tomson & Baron	Maria	Edyta	Andrzej
1	Bartosz Staniszewski	22	Thinking Out Loud	—	—	✔	✔
2	Adrian Wojtków	21	Careless Whisper	✔	✔	✔	✔
3	Małgorzata Bernatowicz	25	People Help The People	—	—	✔	✔
4	Anastazja Roskacz	18	The Power Of Love	✔	✔	—	✔
5	Janusz Waściński	56	Szczęśliwej Drogi Już Czas	—	—	—	—
6	Michalina Stokowy	19	Where Is The Love	✔	—	—	—
7	Piotr 'Elton' Waśkowski	29	Everybody Hurts	✔	—	✔	✔

=== Episode 9 (October 3, 2015) ===
Order	Artist	Age	Song	Coach's and contestant's choices			
Order	Artist	Age	Song	Tomson & Baron	Maria	Edyta	Andrzej
1	Anna Kłys	26	Sleeping In My Car	✔	✔	✔	✔
2	Marcin Staszek	24	She's So High	✔	—	—	✔
3	Aleksandra Szumińska	19	Can't Help Falling In Love	✔	✔	✔	✔
4	Natalia Świerczyńska-Adamczyk	25	Incomplete	—	✔	✔	✔
5	Dawid Klimanek	24	Jeszcze Raz	—	—	—	—
6	Paula Kucharska	23	Chain Of Fools	✔	✔	—	✔
7	Natalia Kowalska	16	Read All About It, Pt. III	✔	✔	—	✔
8	Łukasz Wicenciak	36	Just The Way You Are	✔	✔	—	✔

=== Episode 10 (October 3, 2015) ===
Order	Artist	Age	Song	Coach's and contestant's choices			
Order	Artist	Age	Song	Tomson & Baron	Maria	Edyta	Andrzej
1	Marta Moszczyńska	26	Demons	✔	✔	—	—
2	Michał Gieczewski	27	Miód	—	—	✔	✔
3	Łukasz Bernaś	23	Jak Nie My To Kto	—	—	—	—
4	Ewa Lewandowska-Ekwa	19	All Of Me	—	✔	✔	—
5	Alicja Westerlich	24	Scarlett	—	✔	✔	✔
6	Sara Girgis	18	Nieznajomy	✔	✔	✔	✔
7	Laura Samojłowicz	30	Stairway to Heaven	—	—	—	—
8	William Prestigiacomo	33	I Wish	✔	✔	✔	✔

== The Battle Rounds ==
Color keys

Artist won the Battle and advances to the Knockouts
Artist lost the Battle but was stolen by another coach and advances to the Knockouts
Artist lost the Battle and was eliminated

Episode & Date	Coach	Order	Winner	Song	Loser	'Steal' result			
Episode & Date	Coach	Order	Winner	Song	Loser	Tomson & Baron	Maria	Edyta	Andrzej
Episode 11 (October 10)	Maria Sadowska	1	Sabina Nycek	"Addicted To You"	Agata Geisler	—	—N/a	—	—
Episode 11 (October 10)	Tomson & Baron	2	Patryk Glinka	"Hold Me, Thrill Me, Kiss Me, Kill Me"	Maciej Grenda	—N/a	✔	—	✔
Episode 11 (October 10)	Andrzej Piaseczny	3	Krzysztof Bobecki	"Za Szkłem"	Michał Krawczyk	—	—	✔	—N/a
Episode 11 (October 10)	Edyta Górniak	4	Katarzyna Miśkowiec	"Free Your Mind"	Łukasz Kledzik	—	—	—N/a	—
Episode 11 (October 10)	Edyta Górniak	4	Katarzyna Miśkowiec	"Free Your Mind"	Alicja Westerlich	—	—	—N/a	—
Episode 11 (October 10)	Maria Sadowska	5	Michał Retelewski	"One Day/Reckoning Song"	Weronika Lewandowska	—	—N/a	—	—
Episode 11 (October 10)	Andrzej Piaseczny	6	Hubert Szczęsny	"Na Chwilę"	Paweł Szutta	—	—	—	—N/a
Episode 11 (October 10)	Edyta Górniak	7	Ana Andrzejewska	"Naucz Mnie"	Sara Girgis	✔	✔	—N/a	—
Episode 11 (October 10)	Andrzej Piaseczny	8	Karolina Leszko	"Next To Me"	Natalia Kowalska	—	✔	—	—N/a
Episode 11 (October 10)	Tomson & Baron	9	Tobiasz Staniszewski	"Ain't No Mountain High Enough"	Asteya Dec	—N/a	✔	—	—
Episode 12 (October 17)	Edyta Górniak	1	Natalia Świerczyńska-Adamczyk	"Euphoria"	Emilia Dębska	—	—N/a	—N/a	—
Episode 12 (October 17)	Tomson & Baron	2	Marta Moszyńska	"FourFiveSeconds"	Andrzej Mrozek	—N/a	—N/a	—	—
Episode 12 (October 17)	Maria Sadowska	3	Fabian Kowolik	"Przed Śniadaniem"	Łukasz Wicenciak	—	—N/a	—	—
Episode 12 (October 17)	Maria Sadowska	4	Katarzyna Malenda	"Uptown Funk"	Aleksandra Turoń	—	—N/a	✔	—
Episode 12 (October 17)	Andrzej Piaseczny	5	Paula Kucharska	"Na Kolana"	Agnieszka Bardoń	—	—N/a	—N/a	—N/a
Episode 12 (October 17)	Tomson & Baron	6	Klaudia Duda	"Run The World (Girls)"	Michalina Stokowy	—N/a	—N/a	—N/a	—
Episode 12 (October 17)	Edyta Górniak	7	Daniel Cebula-Orynicz	"Ain't Nobody"	Małgorzata Bernatowicz	—	—N/a	—N/a	—
Episode 12 (October 17)	Andrzej Piaseczny	8	William Prestigiacomo	"Love Never Felt So Good"	Piotr "Elton" Waśkowski	—	—N/a	—N/a	—N/a
Episode 12 (October 17)	Maria Sadowska	9	Ewa Lewandowska-Ekwa	"Street Life"	Aleksandra Szumińska	—	—N/a	—N/a	—
Episode 12 (October 17)	Edyta Górniak	10	Marcin Czyżewski	"Napraw"	Paweł Tymiński	✔	—N/a	—N/a	—
Episode 13 (October 24)	Tomson & Baron	1	Łukasz Muszyński	Nic do Stracenia	Paweł Ceberek	—N/a	—N/a	—N/a	—
Episode 13 (October 24)	Edyta Górniak	2	Julia Bogdańska	Run To You	Ewelina łuszczek	—N/a	—N/a	—N/a	—
Episode 13 (October 24)	Andrzej Piaseczny	3	Agnieszka Birecka	I Really Like You	Paloma Lokus	—N/a	—N/a	—N/a	—N/a
Episode 13 (October 24)	Maria Sadowska	4	Patryk Skoczyński	Badz Duzy	Anastazja Roskacz	—N/a	—N/a	—N/a	—
Episode 13 (October 24)	Tomson & Baron	5	Anna Kłys	Diamonds	Joanna Reczyńska	—N/a	—N/a	—N/a	—
Episode 13 (October 24)	Andrzej Piaseczny	6	Marcin Staszek	Ghost Town	Bartosz Staniszewski	—N/a	—N/a	—N/a	—N/a
Episode 13 (October 24)	Maria Sadowska	7	Krzysztof Iwaneczko	Lay Me Down	Piotr Tłustochowicz	—N/a	—N/a	—N/a	✔
Episode 13 (October 24)	Edyta Górniak	8	Adrian Wojtków	Rude	Michał Gieczewski	—N/a	—N/a	—N/a	—N/a
Episode 13 (October 24)	Tomson & Baron	9	Julia & Jędrzej Skibowie	Iris	Renata Tuszyńska	—N/a	—N/a	—N/a	—N/a

=== Episode 14 (October 31, 2015) ===
Knockouts took place on 31 October 2015.

Color keys

Artist won the Knockouts and advances to the Live shows
Artist lost the Knockouts and was eliminated

Order	Coach	Song	Winner	Loser	Song
1	Andrzej Piaseczny	"Have I Told You Lately"	Piotr Tłustochowicz	Agnieszka Birecka	"Burn"
1	Andrzej Piaseczny	"Have I Told You Lately"	Piotr Tłustochowicz	Paula Kucharska	"Deeper"
2	Andrzej Piaseczny	"You Know I'm No Good"	Karolina Leszko	Marcin Staszek	"Livin' On A Prayer"
2	Andrzej Piaseczny	"You Know I'm No Good"	Karolina Leszko	Hubert Szczęsny	"Dla Ciebie"
3	Tomson & Baron	"Miód"	Marta Moszczyńska	Sara Girgis	"We Are The People"
3	Tomson & Baron	"Miód"	Marta Moszczyńska	Klaudia Duda	"Mamma Knows Best"
4	Tomson & Baron	"Czerwony Jak Cegła"	Patryk Glinka	Łukasz Muszyński	"Treasure"
4	Tomson & Baron	"Czerwony Jak Cegła"	Patryk Glinka	Paweł Tymiński	"Nieznajomy"
5	Edyta Górniak	"Trójkąty i Kwadraty"	Daniel Cebula - Orynicz	Michał Krawczyk	"Jak Na Lotni"
5	Edyta Górniak	"Trójkąty i Kwadraty"	Daniel Cebula - Orynicz	Natalia Świerczyńska	"Przyjdzie Taki Dzień"
6	Edyta Górniak	"Niebo Dla Ciebie"	Katarzyna Miśkowiec	Adrian Wojtków	"Wkręceni"
6	Edyta Górniak	"Niebo Dla Ciebie"	Katarzyna Miśkowiec	Aleksandra Turoń	"I Wish"
7	Maria Sadowska	"Roar"	Sabina Nycek	Natalia Kowalska	"Pocałuj Noc"
7	Maria Sadowska	"Roar"	Sabina Nycek	Michał Retelewski	"How Deep Is Your Love"
8	Maria Sadowska	"Thinking Out Loud"	Patryk Skoczyński	Ewa Lewandowska	"Just The Two Of Us"
8	Maria Sadowska	"Thinking Out Loud"	Patryk Skoczyński	Fabian Kowolik	"Here Without You"

== Live Shows ==
Color keys

Artist was saved by Public's vote
Artist was saved by his/her coach
Artist was eliminated

=== Episode 15 (November 7, 2015) ===
Order	Coach	Artist	Song	Result
1	Andrzej Piaseczny	Karolina Leszko	"Bad Girls"	Eliminated
2	Andrzej Piaseczny	Maciej Grenda	"Tears in Heaven"	Andrzej's choice
3	Andrzej Piaseczny	Piotr Tłustochowicz	"Uptown Girl"	Public's vote
4	Andrzej Piaseczny	Krzysztof Bobecki	"Wstaję"	Eliminated
5	Andrzej Piaseczny	William Prestigiacomo	"If You Don't Know Me By Now"	Public's vote
6	Maria Sadowska	Sabina Nycek	Szał	Eliminated
7	Maria Sadowska	Asteya Dec	Good Luck	Eliminated
8	Maria Sadowska	Krzysztof Iwaneczko	Uciekaj Moje Serce	Public's vote
9	Maria Sadowska	Patryk Skoczyński	Shut Up And Dance	Public's vote
10	Maria Sadowska	Katarzyna Malenda	Peron	Maria choice
11	Edyta Górniak	Ana Andrzejewska	Unwritten	Edyta choice
12	Edyta Górniak	Marcin Czyżewski	Nie Proszę O Więcej	Eliminated
13	Edyta Górniak	Julia Bogdańska	Let It Go	Public's vote
14	Edyta Górniak	Daniel Cebula - Orynicz	Mirrors	Eliminated
15	Edyta Górniak	Katarzyna Miśkowiec	Chcę Zatrzymać Ten Czas	Public's vote
16	Tomson & Baron	Patryk Glinka	Are You Gonna Go My Way	Eliminated
17	Tomson & Baron	Julia i Jędrzej Skibowie	Hold Back the River	Public's vote
18	Tomson & Baron	Anna Kłys	Elastic Heart	Tomson & Baron choice
19	Tomson & Baron	Marta Moszczyńska	Sail	Eliminated
20	Tomson & Baron	Tobiasz Staniszewski	Jej Portret	Public's vote

Non-competition performances
Order	Performers	Song
1	Nikki Yanofsky	Something New

=== Episode 16 (November 14, 2015) ===
Order	Coach	Artist	Song	Result
1	Edyta Górniak	Katarzyna Miśkowiec	"I Kissed A Girl"	Eliminated
2	Edyta Górniak	Julia Bogdańska	"If I Were A Boy"	Public's vote
3	Edyta Górniak	Ana Andrzejewska	"Say It Right"	Edyta choice
4	Tomson & Baron	Anna Kłys	"Say You Love Me"	Eliminated
5	Tomson & Baron	Julia & Jędrzej Skibowie	Gaj	Tomson & Baron choice
6	Tomson & Baron	Tobiasz Staniszewski	"Long Train Runnin'"	Public's vote
7	Maria Sadowska	Patryk Skoczyński	"Heroes"	Eliminated
8	Maria Sadowska	Katarzyna Malenda	"How Deep Is Your Love"	Maria choice
9	Maria Sadowska	Krzysztof Iwaneczko	"Another Day"	Public's vote
10	Andrzej Piaseczny	Piotr Tłustochowicz	"Ona Czyli Ja"	Eliminated
11	Andrzej Piaseczny	Maciej Grenda	"Chwile Jak Te"	Public's vote
12	Andrzej Piaseczny	William Prestigiacomo	"You Can't Hurry Love"	Andrzej's choice

Non-competition performances
Order	Performers	Song
1	Halina Mlynkova	Zabiore Cie
2	Michał Sobierajski	Dźwięk
3	Natalia Nykiel	Ekrany
4	Team Edyta Górniak	Hero
5	Team Tomson & Baron	Faith
6	Team Maria Sadowska	Beat It
7	Team Andrzej Piaseczny	All You Need Is Love

=== Episode 17 - Semifinal (November 21, 2015) ===
Order	Coach	Artist	Song	Duet Song	Coach	Public	Total	Result
1	Maria Sadowska	Katarzyna Malenda	Hold My Hand	"Czas nas uczy pogody"	48	7,64	55,64	Eliminated
2	Maria Sadowska	Krzysztof Iwaneczko	Sugar	"Czas nas uczy pogody"	52	92,36	144,36	Advanced the Final
3	Andrzej Piaseczny	Maciej Grenda	Black Horse and Jerry Terry	"Hit the road Jack"	46	46,38	92,38	Eliminated
4	Andrzej Piaseczny	William Prestigiacomo	Hello	"Hit the road Jack"	54	53,62	107,62	Advanced the Final
5	Edyta Górniak	Julia Bogdańska	Małe Rzeczy	"You are not alone"	40	56,09	96,09	Eliminated
6	Edyta Górniak	Ana Andrzejewska	Crazy In Love	"You are not alone"	60	43,91	103,91	Advanced the Final
7	Tomson & Baron	Julia & Jędrzej Skibowie	Janie's Got A Gun	"Impossible"	45	23,52	68,52	Eliminated
8	Tomson & Baron	Tobiasz Staniszewski	Too Much Love Will Kill You	"Impossible"	55	76,48	131,48	Advanced the Final

Non-competition performances
Order	Performers	Song
1	Adam Lambert	Ghost Town
2	Adam Lambert	Another Lonely High

=== Episode 18 - Final (November 28, 2015) ===
Result details

- Winner
- Runner-up
- Third place
- Fourth Place

Order	Coach	Artist	Song		Result
1	Tomson & Baron	Tobiasz Staniszewski	Duet with guest	Na pewno (with Sound'n'Grace)	Runner-up
1	Tomson & Baron	Tobiasz Staniszewski	Solo song	Wspomnienie	Runner-up
1	Tomson & Baron	Tobiasz Staniszewski	Duet with coach	It's a Man's Man's Man's World	Runner-up
1	Tomson & Baron	Tobiasz Staniszewski	Original song	Pure	Runner-up
2	Edyta Górniak	Ana Andrzejewska	Duet with guest	Najpiękniejsi (with Jakub Badach)	Third place
2	Edyta Górniak	Ana Andrzejewska	Solo song	I Follow Rivers	Third place
2	Edyta Górniak	Ana Andrzejewska	Duet with coach	Stop!	Third place
2	Edyta Górniak	Ana Andrzejewska	Original song	—N/a	Third place
3	Andrzej Piaseczny	William Prestigiacomo	Duet with guest	Just the Two of Us (with Margaret)	Fourth Place
3	Andrzej Piaseczny	William Prestigiacomo	Solo song	Isn't She Lovely	Fourth Place
3	Andrzej Piaseczny	William Prestigiacomo	Duet with coach	Se Bastasse Una Canzone	Fourth Place
3	Andrzej Piaseczny	William Prestigiacomo	Original song	—N/a	Fourth Place
4	Maria Sadowska	Krzysztof Iwaneczko	Duet with guest	Decymy (with Natalia Kukulska)	Winner
4	Maria Sadowska	Krzysztof Iwaneczko	Solo song	Writing's on the Wall	Winner
4	Maria Sadowska	Krzysztof Iwaneczko	Duet with coach	Cheek to Cheek	Winner
4	Maria Sadowska	Krzysztof Iwaneczko	Original song	To nie sen	Winner

Non-competition performances
Order	Performers	Song
1	The finalists	She's the One / Millennium / Rock DJ / Candy / Let Me Entertain You
2	Liber & Mateusz Ziółko	7 rzeczy
3	Margaret	Heartbeat

== Results summary of live shows ==
Color keys
Artist's info

- Artist from Team Tomson & Baron
- Artist from Team Maria Sadowska
- Artist from Team Edyta Górniak
- Artist from Team Andrzej Piaseczny

Result details

- Artist was proclaimed as winner
- Artist was proclaimed as runner-up
- Artist was proclaimed as third place
- Artist was proclaimed as fourth place
- Artist advanced to the finals
- Artist was saved by his/her coach
- Artist was saved by the public
- Artist received the fewest accumulated total points and was eliminated
- Artist received the fewest of the public's vote and was eliminated

Live show results per week
Artist	Week 1	Week 2	Week 3	Finals
Krzysztof Iwaneczko	Safe	Safe	Advanced	Winner
Tobiasz Staniszewski	Safe	Safe	Advanced	Runner-up
Ana Andrzejewska	Safe	Safe	Advanced	3rd place
William Prestigiacomo	Safe	Safe	Advanced	4th place
Julia & Jędrzej Skibowie	Safe	Safe	Eliminated	Eliminated (Week 3)
Katarzyna Malenda	Safe	Safe	Eliminated	Eliminated (Week 3)
Julia Bogdańska	Safe	Safe	Eliminated	Eliminated (Week 3)
Maciej Grenda	Safe	Safe	Eliminated	Eliminated (Week 3)
Anna Kłys	Safe	Eliminated	Eliminated (Week 2)	
Patryk Skoczyński	Safe	Eliminated	Eliminated (Week 2)	
Katarzyna Miśkowiec	Safe	Eliminated	Eliminated (Week 2)	
Piotr Tłustochowicz	Safe	Eliminated	Eliminated (Week 2)	
Sabina Nycek	Eliminated	Eliminated (Week 1)		
Asteya Dec	Eliminated	Eliminated (Week 1)		
Marta Moszczyńska	Eliminated	Eliminated (Week 1)		
Patryk Glinka	Eliminated	Eliminated (Week 1)		
Daniel Cebula - Orynicz	Eliminated	Eliminated (Week 1)		
Marcin Czyżewski	Eliminated	Eliminated (Week 1)		
Karolina Leszko	Eliminated	Eliminated (Week 1)		
Krzysztof Bobecki	Eliminated	Eliminated (Week 1)		
