= Dancemania 4 =

Compilation album by various artists
- Released: 16 January 1997
- Genre: Electronic, pop (house, synthpop)
- Length: 71:00
- Label: EMI Music Japan
- Producer: Masaaki Saito (executive producer); Hitoshi Namekata (producer)

Dancemania chronology
| 3 (1996) | Dancemania 4 (1997) | 5 (1997) |

Dancemania 4 is the fourth set in the Dancemania series of dance music compilation albums, released in early 1997 by EMI Music Japan.

With its 23 tracks and one bonus track, the album debuted at #6 on Oricon's weekly album chart in January 1997 and reached #3 the next week, appearing on the yearly best-selling album chart at #92 in 1997 with 241,570 copies sold, along with its successor, 5, which ranked #98.

Several tracks on the album, including different remixes, can also be found on other Dancemania albums such as 1, Delux, Extra, Diamond, Diamond Complete Edition, Best Yellow, Best Red, Zip Mania, Zip Mania DX, Zip Mania Best, Bass #1, Speed 3 or Winters.

== Tracks ==
| # | Track | By | Ref |
|---|---|---|---|
| 1 | Wannabe | Spice Girls | |
| 2 | Party | Ex-It | |
| 3 | Saturday Every Man A Queen | Sister Queen | |
| 4 | Touch of Your Love | Me & My | |
| 5 | Fritz Love My Tits | E-Rotic | |
| 6 | Killing Me Softly | Just a Girl | |
| 7 | Por Causa Do Amor | Zona | |
| 8 | Boy Toy | Philly | |
| 9 | What Becomes of the Broken Hearted? | Dancematic | |
| 10 | Anytime | Obsession | |
| 11 | I Got To Believe | Kate Project | |
| 12 | Baby, Show Me Your Butt | Jag | |
| 13 | I Want Candy | Candy Girls | |
| 14 | Go Away | Look Twice | |
| 15 | Stay | M.A.N. | |
| 16 | Love in the 1st Degree | Body Parts | |
| 17 | Thrill Me, Thrill Me | Choice | |
| 18 | The Fire | Prophesy | |
| 19 | Yodeling's on the Scene | Sandi | |
| 20 | Heartbeat | Xenia | |
| 21 | We Shall Dance | Fun Master | |
| 22 | Everybody | Kinky | |
| 23 | The Beat of Green | Fargetta | |
| 24 | Dub-I-Dub | The Axel Boys Quartet | |

== Further details ==
Intro with "Wannabe"

#20 "Heartbeat"
"Heartbeat" was the debut single by Xenia, originally an actress whose popularity was rising at the time for appearing on the German TV series Cult.

The album's overall average tempo is 140 bpm;

The slowest track is "Dub-I-Dub" (#24) at 72 bpm.
The fastest track is "We Shall Dance" (#21) at 177 bpm.

Several tracks are cover versions or remix versions.

#6 "Killing Me Softly" is a cover remix version of Roberta Flack's "Killing Me Softly with His Song".
#9 "What Becomes of the Broken Hearted?" is a cover version of Jimmy Ruffin's "What Becomes of the Brokenhearted".
#15 "Stay" is a cover version of Jackson Browne's "Stay".
#21 "We Shall Dance" is a cover remix version of Demis Roussos's "We Shall Dance".
#24 "Dub-I-Dub", included as bonus track, is a cover version of Me & My's "Dub-I-Dub".

The non-stop mixing was done by DJ Smurf a.k.a. Paul Rincon and his partner, Dip "T" Jones, who has co-produced many remixes with Smurf.

| # | Track | Length | BPM | Ref | Artist(s) | From / based in | Ref |
|---|---|---|---|---|---|---|---|
| 1 | Wannabe | 4:03 | 113 | | Spice Girls | United Kingdom | |
| 2 | Party | 3:04 | 113 | | Ex-It | Germany | |
| 3 | Saturday Every Man A Queen | 3:16 | 134 | | Sister Queen | France | |
| 4 | Touch of Your Love | 2:36 | 136 | | Me & My | Denmark | |
| 5 | Fritz Love My Tits | 2:34 | 145 | | E-Rotic | Germany | |
| 6 | Killing Me Softly | 3:56 | 129 | | Just a Girl | Australia | |
| 7 | Por Causa Do Amor | 2:31 | 133 | | Zona | Austria | |
| 8 | Boy Toy | 3:08 | 133 | | Philly | Germany | |
| 9 | What Becomes of the Broken Hearted? | 2:27 | 136 | | Dancematic | United Kingdom | |
| 10 | Anytime | 2:57 | 136 | | Obsession | United Kingdom | |
| 11 | I Got To Believe | 2:35 | 136 | | Kate Project | Italy | |
| 12 | Baby, Show Me Your Butt | 2:48 | 138 | | Jag | Germany | |
| 13 | I Want Candy | 2:47 | 140 | | Candy Girls | United Kingdom | |
| 14 | Go Away | 2:31 | 145 | | Look Twice | Sweden | |
| 15 | Stay | 3:37 | 150 | | M.A.N. | Italy | |
| 16 | Love in the 1st Degree | 2:18 | 160 | | Body Parts | Netherlands | |
| 17 | Thrill Me, Thrill Me | 2:40 | 163 | | Choice | Unknown | — |
| 18 | The Fire | 4:10 | 168 | | Prophesy | Switzerland | |
| 19 | Yodeling's on the Scene | 2:51 | 168 | | Sandi | Hungary | |
| 20 | Heartbeat | 3:14 | 175 | | Xenia | Germany | |
| 21 | We Shall Dance | 2:50 | 177 | | Fun Master | Czechoslovakia | |
| 22 | Everybody | 3:41 | 130 | | Kinky | United Kingdom | |
| 23 | The Beat of Green | 2:15 | 131-115 | | Fargetta | Italy | |
| 24 | Dub-I-Dub | 2:53 | 72 | | The Axel Boys Quartet | Denmark | |
