= Dancemania 6 =

Compilation album by various artists
- Released: July 16, 1997
- Genres: Electronic (Italo disco, Euro house, trance)
- Length: 77:00
- Label: EMI Music Japan
- Producers: Masaaki Saito (executive producer); Hiro Kadoma (producer)

Dancemania chronology
5 (1997)	Dancemania 6 (1997)	7 (1997)

Dancemania 6 is the sixth set in the Dancemania series of dance music compilation albums, released in mid-1997 by EMI Music Japan.

The album debuted at #10 on Oricon's weekly album chart in July 1997 and remained within the top 20 positions on the chart for 4 consecutive weeks.

Several tracks on the album, including different remixes, can also be found on other Dancemania albums such as X9, Delux 2, Delux 4, Delux 5, Extra, Zip Mania II, Speed 2, Speed 4, Speed Best 2001, Summers, Bass #1, Bass #9, Bass #10, Super Techno, Scorccio Super Hit Mix, Best Red or Happy Paradise.

== Tracks ==
#	Track	By	Ref
1	Turn Me On	E-Rotic	
2	Holiday	Captain Jack	
3	Daddy Boom	Tiggy	
4	2 Become 1	Wildside	
5	People of Love	Amen UK	
6	Can't Get Enough	Love & Devotion	
7	Your Love	Fargetta	
8	Getting Out	Bertine	
9	Here in Paradise	Amya	
10	When I Dream of You	Morgana	
11	Let the Dream Come True	DJ BoBo	
12	The Funky Generation	The Funky Reverend	
13	Who Wants to be Your Lover	Jimmy James	
14	Just Playin'	JT Playaz	
15	S.O.S.	Abbacadabra	
16	Fame	Betty V	
17	Tomorrow	Y.O.U.R.I. feat. Mireille	
18	Atlantis	Ayla	
19	Everytime I See You	Jemma & Elise	
20	Is This the Way You Kill a Love	Gina	
21	If You Were Here	Jennifer	
22	Somewhere Over the Rainbow	Mary Ann	

== Further details ==
Intro with "Turn Me On"
"Turn Me On" was taken from E-Rotic's 3rd album, Sexual Madness, which had been released only in Japan at the time of this compilation's release.

The album's overall average tempo is 137 bpm;

The lowest bpm is 130 (#7-9).
The highest bpm is 146 (#20).

The album contains 6 covers or remixes.

#2 "Holiday" is a cover of Madonna's "Holiday".
#4 "2 Become 1" is a cover of Spice Girls' "2 Become 1".
#14 "Just Playin'" sampled Sister Sledge's "Greatest Dancer".
#15 "S.O.S." is a cover of ABBA's "S.O.S.".
#16 "Fame" is a cover of Irene Cara's "Fame".
#22 "Somewhere Over the Rainbow" is a cover of Judy Garland's "Over the Rainbow".

The non-stop mixing was done by Jonas Thorne, a DJ based in Sweden and Norway.

#	Track	Length	BPM	Ref	Artist(s)	From / based in	Ref
1	Turn Me On	4:15	137		E-Rotic	Germany	
2	Holiday	3:36	137		Captain Jack	Germany	
3	Daddy Boom	2:57	137		Tiggy	Denmark	
4	2 Become 1	4:52	140		Wildside	Italy	
5	People of Love	3:45	139		Amen UK	United Kingdom	
6	Can't Get Enough	4:34	134		Love & Devotion	Sweden	
7	Your Love	3:20	130		Fargetta	Italy	
8	Getting Out	2:39	130		Bertine	Norway	
9	Here in Paradise	3:33	130		Amya	Italy	
10	When I Dream of You	3:10	134		Morgana	Italy	
11	Let the Dream Come True	4:00	137		DJ BoBo	Switzerland	
12	The Funky Generation	2:44	137		The Funky Reverend	Germany	
13	Who Wants to be Your Lover	3:07	136		Jimmy James	United States	
14	Just Playin'	3:20	136		JT Playaz	United Kingdom	
15	S.O.S.	3:29	135		Abbacadabra	United Kingdom	
16	Fame	3:47	135		Betty V	Italy	
17	Tomorrow	3:32	135		Y.O.U.R.I. feat. Mireille	Italy	
18	Atlantis	2:19	136		Ayla	Germany	
19	Everytime I See You	2:43	139		Jemma & Elise	Sweden	
20	Is This the Way You Kill a Love	3:55	146		Gina	United States	
21	If You Were Here	3:32	145		Jennifer	United States	
22	Somewhere Over the Rainbow	3:43	145		Mary Ann	Australia	
