= JT Playaz =

Musical group

JT Playaz are a European neo-disco group, produced by Giles Goodman and Mark Summers (Scorccio). They recorded a UK number 30 hit single, "Just Playin'" (1997), and were subsequently featured on many compilations including Dancemania's sixth issue and in the music video game Dance Dance Revolution. Their other UK Singles Chart entry was "Let's Get Down", which reached number 64 in May 1998.

== Discography ==
=== Singles ===
List of singles, with selected chart positions
Title	Year	Peak chart positions	
Title	Year	AUS	UK
"Just Playin'"	1997	76	30
"Let's Get Down"	1998	—	64
"Ride the Groove"	2019	—	—
