= Szandi =

- Born: Alexandra Pintácsi Réka; 7 July 1976 (age 50); Budapest, Hungary
- Genres: Pop; rock and roll
- Occupation: Singer
- Instrument: Vocals
- Years active: 1989–present
- Labels: Hungaroton; Sony Music; EMI; TBT
- Website: szandi.info/web/

Szandi (born Alexandra Pintácsi on 7 July 1976), also credited as Sandi in English, is a Hungarian pop singer.

== Career ==
Szandi was discovered by Miklós Fenyő, a prominent Hungarian rock and roll singer to whom she was introduced by her elder sister Viki (also a singer). She debuted as a singer at the age of 13 when she released her debut studio album Kicsi lány ("Little Girl") in 1989. The album was sold in 270,000 copies within weeks and made her the youngest artist in Hungary with a platinum record. In her first six years, Szandi earned six gold albums and three platinum albums, and sold over one million records.

In 1991 she starred in the movie Szerelmes szívek «"Hearts in Love"» directed by György Dobray, the acclaimed director of teen movies like Love Till First Blood. The film was a romantic musical comedy loosely based on her life and career beginnings, its soundtrack of the same title was her third album.

After her fourth studio album her recording contract with Miklós Fenyő ended, and her career took a different turn. The classic rock and roll feeling that dominated her style during the Fenyő years was still present in her fifth, self-titled studio album, which featured cover songs of classic oldies plus one original song, but after that she experimented with new styles and releasing songs that were more contemporary in sound, though she occasionally returned to the style of the 60s and 70s and covered songs from these eras.

Her 1996 single, Yodeling's on the Scene, was produced by a Danish production team, Hartmann & Langhoff, known for producing works for Me & My. This was released under her English name Sandi, and was her first English-language hit. The next year, 1997, she released her first English-language studio album Dancing Flame. Her second English-language single "You Never Know" also achieved success.

In 1999 she married musician Csaba Bogdán, who is now her manager and the main songwriter of her albums. They met when Szandi was 16 years old and Csaba was 32, and her parents were originally not fond of their relationship, but when she turned 18 she moved to Csaba and they married a few years later. They have three children, a daughter, Blanka and two sons, Domonkos and Csaba. Szandi is a practicing Christian, she became religious and was baptized when she was 12.

Szandi has released 18 albums and 11 singles as of 2010. Several of her songs have been featured on various compilations, including "Lesz Twist, Igen" being featured on Aranyalbum (1995), "Yodeling's on the Scene" being featured on Dancemania 4 (1997) and "You Never Know" being featured on Dancemania 8 (1998).

== Discography ==
Based on the official site

1. Kicsi lány «"Little Girl"» or «"Baby Girl"» (1989)
2. Tinédzser l'amour «"Teenager l'amour"» (1990)
3. Szerelmes szívek «"Hearts in Love"»; soundtrack for the film of the same name (1991)
4. Aranyos (compilation album of the most famous songs of her first three albums; the title is a word play on the Hungarian words for "cute" and "gold" (1991)
5. I Love You Baby (1992)
6. Szandi (cover songs of 60s classic with Hungarian lyrics) (1993)
7. Tizennyolc «"Eighteen"» (1994)
8. Szan-di-li (the title is a word play on her name and the Hungarian word for "madness" (1995)
9. Bumeráng party «"Boomerang Party"» (1996)
10. Dancing Flame (English-language album) (1997)
11. Azok a szép napok «"Those Beautiful Days"»; covers of old Hungarian classics of the 60s and 70s (1998)
12. Kedvenc Dalaim «"My Favourite Songs"», another cover album with Hungarian and foreign songs (1999)
13. Dúdold a szív dallamát «"Hum the Melody of the Heart"» (2000)
14. Minden percem a szerelemé «"Every Minute I Have Is for Love"» (2001)
15. Egyszer az életben «"Once in a Lifetime"» (2003)
16. Tárd ki a szíved «"Open Your Heart"» (2005)
17. Best of Szandi Remix (2006)
18. Rabold el a szívemet! «"Kidnap My Heart"» (2009)

== See also ==
- Hungarian pop
