= Exponential map =

In differential geometry, the exponential map is a generalization of the ordinary exponential function of mathematical analysis. Important special cases include:

- exponential map (Riemannian geometry) for a manifold with a Riemannian metric,
- exponential map (Lie theory) from a Lie algebra to a Lie group,
- More generally, in a manifold with an affine connection, $X \mapsto \gamma_X(1)$, where $\gamma_X$ is a geodesic with initial velocity X, is sometimes also called the exponential map. The above two are special cases of this with respect to appropriate affine connections.
- Euler's formula forming the unit circle in the complex plane.
