= Maria Sadowska =

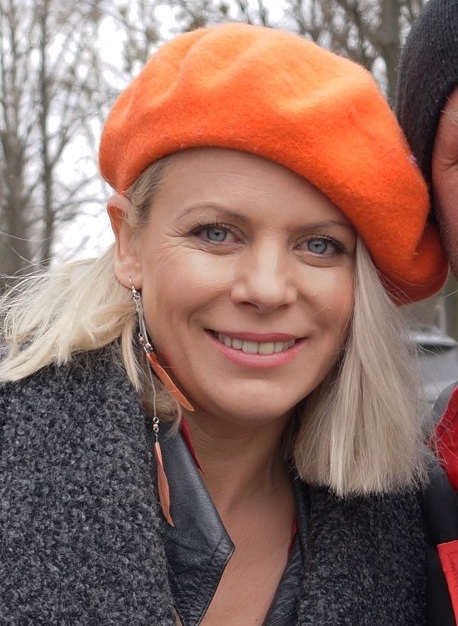
- Sadowska in 2019
- Born: 27 June 1976 (age 50); Warsaw, Poland
- Education: Fryderyk Chopin Academy of Music in Warsaw; National Film School in Łódź
- Occupations: Singer-songwriter, music producer, film director, screenwriter
- Musical career
- Genres: Jazz, Pop, Funk, Soul, Electronic, Jazz Dance
- Labels: EMI Music Japan, Sony BMG Music Entertainment Poland, Sony Music Entertainment Poland, Fonografika, QM Music, Warner Music Poland
- Website: www.mariasadowska.com

Maria Sadowska (born 27 June 1976 in Warsaw), also credited as Marysia Sadowska or simply as Marysia, is a Polish pop singer, music producer, screenwriter and film director.

== Career ==
=== Early life ===
Sadowska was born in the capital of Poland, Warsaw, to her father, a composer, and her mother, a jazz singer. She debuted as a singer at the age of 14, and produced a musical, at the age of 17, where she wrote and composed its theme music and played the main role.

=== 1990s ===
"Maybe Baby" (1997)
"Maybe Baby" was featured on Dancemania 8 before it was included on her 2nd album Lucky Star.

Sadowska released her first album Jutro in 1995. Two years later, in 1997, she released her second and third albums, Lucky Star and Crazy, exclusively in Japan. The latter's title track was featured on Dancemania's seventh issue, and two songs from Lucky Star, "Maybe Baby" and "Lucky Star", were featured respectively on Dancemania 8 and Dancemania 9.

=== 2000s ===
In 2004, Sadowska released her fourth, jazz-dance-orientated album, Marysia Sadowska, which reached number 38 on the Polish OLiS chart.

Her fifth album, Tribute to Komeda, was literally a tribute album to Krzysztof Komeda. In its release year of 2006, the album reached No. 11 on OLiS' chart and was certified gold. The next year, 2007, she appeared on the British TV show Dancing on Ice, and released her sixth album Gwiazda dla każdego.

The 2009 album Spis treści featured her tenth single "Jest dobrze". Spis treści was her first completely self-produced album.

=== 2010s ===
Her debut feature film Women's Day (Dzień kobiet) was released in 2013 and received the main award at the 22nd Film Festival Cottbus.

Sadowska was the judge of the third and fourth season of Polish TV show The Voice of Poland, with participants from her team winning twice. She returned to judging for the show's sixth season, and won again.

In 2019, Maria Sadowska took part in TVN's reality show Agent – Gwiazdy and she played the role of the title character – the Mole (pol. Agent).

== Personal life ==
Sadowska is the daughter of composer Krzysztof Sadowski and singer Liliana Urbańska. She earned a second degree in piano at the Fryderyk Chopin Academy of Music in Warsaw soon after the releases of Lucky Star and Crazy. She also graduated from the Lodz Film School in 2002.

== Discography ==
=== Albums ===
Title	Album details	Peak chart positions	Certifications
Title	Album details	POL	Certifications
Jutro	Released: 1995; Label: STD; Formats: CD	—	
Lucky Star	Released: 18 February 1998; Label: EMI Music Japan; Formats: CD	—	
Marysia Sadowska	Released: 24 February 2004; Label: Sony Music Poland; Formats: CD	38	
Gwiazda dla każdego	Released: 3 December 2007; Label: Sony BMG; Formats: CD	—	
Spis treści	Released: 8 June 2009; Label: Sony Music Poland; Formats: CD, digital download	—	
Demakijaż	Released: 9 November 2009; Label: QM Music; Formats: CD, digital download	—	
Jazz na ulicach	Released: 1 April 2014; Label: Warner Music Poland; Formats: CD, digital download	24	POL: Gold
Początek nocy	Released: 16 October 2020; Label: Agora; Formats: CD, digital download	29	
"—" denotes a recording that did not chart or was not released in that territory.

=== Cover albums ===
Title	Album details	Peak chart positions	Certifications
Title	Album details	POL	Certifications
Kaczmarski & Jazz with Anna Serafińska and Janusz Szrom	Released: 4 October 2010; Label: QM Music; Formats: CD, digital download	—	
Tribute to Komeda	Released: 12 June 2006; Label: Sony BMG; Formats: CD, digital download	11	POL: Gold
"—" denotes a recording that did not chart or was not released in that territory.

=== Soundtrack albums ===
Title	Album details
Dzień Kobiet	Released: 8 March 2013; Label: Fonografika; Formats: CD, digital download

=== Extended plays ===
Title	Album details
Crazy	Released: 7 October 1997; Label: EMI Music Japan; Formats: CD
