= Regina "Queen" Saraiva =

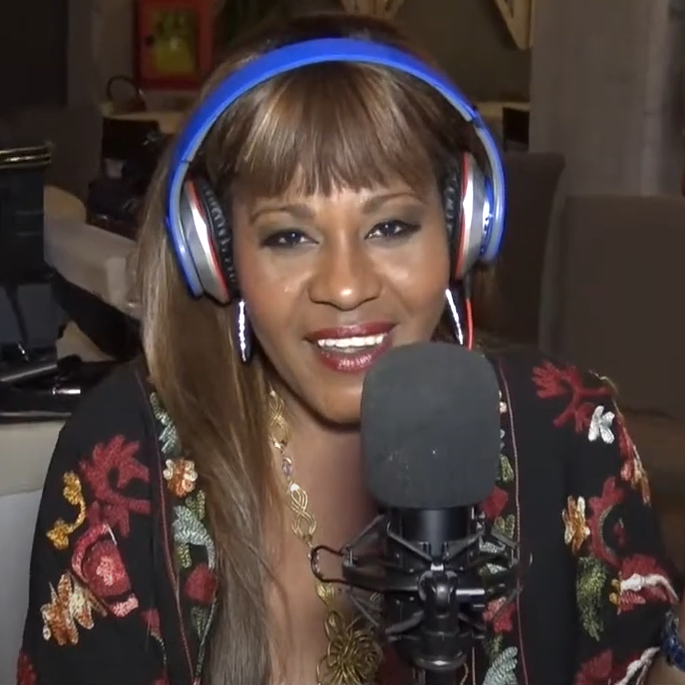
- Regina "Queen" Saraiva in 2019

Background information
- Born: Regina Aparecida Saraiva; 1 September 1968 (age 57); Sorocaba, São Paulo, Brazil
- Genres: Dance, Eurodance
- Occupations: Vocalist, actress, dancer
- Instrument: Vocals
- Years active: 1995–present
- Labels: Discomagic, Nitelife, Do It Yourself, Sony

Regina Aparecida "Queen" Saraiva (born September 1, 1968, Sorocaba, São Paulo, Brazil), also known as Regina, Queen Regina, or Jean Jane, is a Brazilian-born Italian eurodance vocalist, dancer and actress who scored several hits across Europe from 1997 to 2003. She lives in Milan, Italy, where she is a part of the gospel choir that is featured on Piero Chiambretti’s program Markette which broadcasts by La7 as well as performing new material. She was also a member of the Brazilian dance act Forbidden Fruit from 1989 to 1995. "Day by Day" was her only big hit in the United States, peaking at #11 on Billboard Magazine's Hot Dance Music/Club Play chart in 1997.

== Discography ==
=== Singles ===
- "You Got Me Now" (as F.M. presents Jean Jane) (1994)
- "Take Me Up" (as Jean Jane) (1994)
- "Party Town" (as Jean Jane) (1994)
- "Killing Me Softly" (1996)
- "Day by Day" (1997)
- "Stranger in Paradise" (With Xpone, billed as "Queen Regina") (1997)
- "Close the door"
- What Can You Do (1998)
- "You and Me" (2000)
- "You Don't Fool Me" (2001)
- "Secret Mission" (2000)
- "I'm Back" (2002)
- "Up / You and I" (2007)
- "Time Shine" (Feat Musta y Capasso) (2011)
- "Imaginaçao" (2013)
- "The Girl From Ipanema" (2014)
- "Ibiza Vibe" (2016)

Note: Billboard incorrectly lists "Day By Day" as a 1997 hit for American singer Regina, who had retired from recording at the time.

=== Album ===
- Situations (1998)
