= Day by Day (Regina song) =

Single by Regina Saraiva

from the album Situations
- Released: July 1997
- Genre: Eurodance
- Length: 3:48
- Label: Nitelite Records
- Songwriters: Francesco Marchetti; Massimiliano Moroldo; Nathalie Aarts
- Producers: Francesco Marchetti; Max Moroldo

Regina Saraiva singles chronology
"Killing Me Softly" (1996)	"Day by Day" (1997)	"Up On The Floor" (1998)

Music video
- "Day by Day" on YouTube

"Day by Day" is a 1997 song by Brazilian-born Italian singer, dancer and actress Regina Saraiva. It peaked at number eight in Italy and number eleven on the US Billboard Hot Dance Music/Club Play chart. The magazine incorrectly lists "Day By Day" as a hit for American singer Regina, who last charted in 1988 and had retired from the business at the time of this single’s American release.

== Charts ==
Chart (1997–98)	Peak position
France (SNEP)	32
Italy (Musica e dischi)	8
Sweden (Sverigetopplistan)	22
UK Singles (OCC)	98
UK Dance (OCC)	38
US Dance Club Songs (Billboard)	11

Chart (2022)	Peak position
Hungary (Single Top 40)	39
