= Dancemania =

Japanese compilation album series

Dancemania is a series of remix compilation albums by i-DANCE. The series deals primarily with dance music, especially Eurodance. Despite many of its tracks being made by various musicians from all over the world and mainly from the European continent, the albums have been released exclusively in Japan.

The first issue, Dancemania 1, was released on April 10, 1996, with artists including E-Rotic, Cut 'N' Move, Me & My, Maxx, Basic Element, Magic Affair, Odyssey, Captain Jack, Interactive, Space Pilots, and DJ Quicksilver as the leading mixer. 1 debuted at number 14 on the Oricon weekly album chart in April 1996 and reached number 4 in the same chart in May 1996 and ranked number 56 in the yearly Top 100 best-selling album chart in 1996 with 480,980 copies sold.

Dancemania has spawned many sub-series projects, such as Summers & Winters, Bass, Euro Mix, Super Techno, Classics, Delux, Game, Club, Zip Mania, Trance, Trance Paradise, Covers and Speed. Many of these sub-series have further each spawned their own sub-series projects.

The series released approximately 50 volumes in its first four years and the label claims that over 10 million copies were sold by the end of the 20th century. Some of song later appear on Spotify.

Many songs from the series have been licensed for use in Bemani games by Konami, such as Dance Dance Revolution or Dance Maniax.

Nonstop Megamix Dancemania

== Releases ==
No.	Release date	Ref
1	April 10, 1996	
2	July 17, 1996	
3	October 9, 1996	
4	January 16, 1997	
5	April 28, 1997	
6	July 16, 1997	
7	October 16, 1997	
8	January 16, 1998	
9	April 29, 1998	
10	July 16, 1998	
X1	January 13, 1999	
X2	April 9, 1999	
X3	July 23, 1999	
X4	October 20, 1999	
X5	January 13, 2000	
X6	April 12, 2000	
X7	July 19, 2000	
X8	January 17, 2001	
X9	April 18, 2001	
20	November 21, 2001	
21	January 30, 2002	
22	April 26, 2002	

=== Main series ===
- Nonstop Megamix Dancemania 1 – 10, 20 – 22
- Nonstop Megamix Dancemania X1 – X9 (a.k.a. 11 – 19)
- Nonstop Megamix Dancemania EX 1 – EX 9
- Nonstop Megamix Dancemania Best Yellow
- Nonstop Megamix Dancemania Best Red
- Dancemania Tre*Sure 10th Anniversary Special Edition
- Dancemania Sparkle – Best of 90s Dance Pop

=== Sub series ===
==== Summers and Winters ====
Summers mainly features Latin dance and reggae. Winters mainly features handbag house, breakbeat and big beat.

- Nonstop Megamix Dancemania Summers 1 – 3
- Nonstop Megamix Dancemania Summers 2001
- Nonstop Megamix Dancemania Winters 1 – 2
- Nonstop Megamix Dancemania Winters Rock Groove

==== Speed ====
These feature hardcore and happy hardcore songs and remixes.

- Nonstop Megamix Dancemania Speed 1 – 10
- Classical Speed 1 – 2
- Hyper Nonstop Megamix Dancemania Speed G1 – G5
- Happy Speed The Best of Dancemania Speed G
- Hyper Nonstop Megamix Dancemania Speed Best 2001
- Nonstop Megamix Dancemania Speed Presents Happy Ravers
- Nonstop Megamix Dancemania Speed Presents Trance Ravers
- Dancemania Speed Presents Best of Hardcore
- Nonstop Megamix Dancemania Speed SFX
- Hyper Nonstop Megamix Christmas Speed
- Hyper Nonstop Megamix Dancemania Speed TV
- Nonstop Megamix Speed Deka
- Nonstop Megamix Anime Speed
- Anime Speed Newtype Edition
- Speedrive
- Nonstop Megamix Speed Buyuuden

==== Bass ====
These feature Miami Bass, Drum 'n' Bass and Jungle songs.

- Nonstop Megamix Dancemania Bass #0 – #11

==== Euro Mix ====
In this sub-series, "euro" means Eurobeat and Europop.

- Nonstop Megamix Dancemania Euro Mix Happy Paradise 1 – 2
- Dancemania Presents J:Paradise
- Dancemania EURO CLASSICS

==== Super Techno ====
- Nonstop Megamix Dancemania Super Techno I – II
- Nonstop Megamix Dancemania Super Techno Best

==== Classics ====
Classics features vintage tracks of Eurobeat/Hi-NRG/R&B from the late 1970s–1980s club scene.

- Dancemania Classics
- Nonstop Megamix Dancemania Euro Classics
- Nonstop Megamix Dancemania Club Classics 1 – 2
- Nonstop Megamix Dancemania SuperClassics 1 – 3
- Nonstop Megamix Dancemania SuperClassics Best
- Nonstop Megamix Dancemania 80's
- Non-stop Essential Mix Dancemania 80's Two
- Dancemania Sparkle Classics – Best of 80s Disco Pop

==== Trance Paradise ====
- Trance Paradise The Best
- Hime Trance 1 – 4
- Himetra Best
- Himetra Speed
- Himetra Presents Tsukasa Mix
- Himetra Anime*Mix
- Hostrance 1 – 2
- Auto Gallery Tokyo 2006
- Kabatra

==== Others ====
- Non-stop Megamix Dancemania Sports
- Dancemania presents Disco Groove
- Nonstop Megamix Disco Viking
- Nonstop Megamix Disco Viking Megamix
- Dancemania Presents Summer Story 2007 Supported by 9LoveJ
- Dancemania Presents Summer Story 2008 Supported by Club J
- Dancemania Presents Summer Story 2009

==== Special series ====
- Dancemania Delux 1 – 5
- Nonstop Megamix Dancemania Hyper Delux
- Nonstop Megamix Dancemania Extra
- Nonstop Megamix Dancemania Diamond
- Dancemania Diamond Complete Edition

==== Tie-up series ====
===== Game =====
====== D.D.R. ======
- Dance Dance Revolution 2nd Mix Original Soundtrack Presented by Dancemania
- Dance Dance Revolution 3rd Mix Original Soundtrack Presented by Dancemania
- Dance Dance Revolution Solo 2000 Original Soundtrack Presented by Dancemania
- Dance Dance Revolution 4th Mix Original Soundtrack Presented by Dancemania
- Dance Dance Revolution 5th Mix Original Soundtrack Presented by Dancemania
- DDRMAX Dance Dance Revolution 6th Mix Original Soundtrack Presented by Dancemania
- DDRMAX2 Dance Dance Revolution 7th Mix Original Soundtrack Presented by Dancemania
- Original Soundtrack Dance Dance Revolution Extreme
- Original Soundtrack Dance Dance Revolution Party Collection
- Dance Dance Revolution Festival & Strike Original Soundtrack Presented by Dancemania
- Dance Dance Revolution 2nd Mix Original Soundtrack Presented by Dancemania (re-release)

====== Dance Maniax ======
- Original Soundtrack Dance Maniax
- Original Soundtrack Dance Maniax 2nd Mix

====== Beatmania ======
- Beatmania 5th Mix Original Soundtrack Presented by Dancemania
- Beatmania 6th Mix Original Soundtrack Presented by Dancemania

===== Club =====
- Non-stop Mix Fura Mania
- Dancemania Presents Club The Earth I – II
- Dancemania Presents Club The Earth Disco Classics
- Dancemania Presents Two Face
- Dancemania CLUB CLASSICS 1-2

===== Zip Mania =====
- Dancemania featuring Nagoya-based radio station Zip-FM
- Nonstop Megamix Zip Mania 1 – 7

===== Giants Mania =====
- Dancemania Presents Giants Mania

==== Trance ====
- The Best of World Trance FantasiA 1 – 3
- Trance Mania 1 – 3
- Nonstop Megamix Dancemania Trance Z 1 – Z 2
- Nonstop Megamix Dancemania Super Trance Best

==== Covers ====
Covers features cover versions of various famous songs remixed and covered by dance music acts.

- Dancemania COVERS
- Dancemania COVERS 2
- Dancemania COVERS 01

==== Artist ====
- Dancemania Presents E-Rotic Megamix
- Dancemania Presents Scorccio Super Hit Mix
- Dancemania Presents Cartoons Toontastic!
- Dancemania Presents Captain Jack Captain's Best - Best Hits and New Songs -
- The Very Best of E-Rotic
- Dancemania Presents Captain Jack Party Warriors

==== Video series ====
- Nonstop Megamix * Video Happy Paradise Para Para Mania
