= Exp (band) =

- Origin: Italy
- Genres: Dance, electronic
- Years active: 1992–1997
- Members: Luca Galiati; Jimmy Nicoli; Mario Borgonovo; Julia

Exp is an Italian group which released several dance singles in the 1990s, great hits particularly in the discothèques.

== Discography ==
=== Singles ===
- "Before the Night" (with Julia for the vocals) (1992) - #25 in France
- "Save Me" (1993)
- "Shake Your Body" (1993)
- "Welcome to the Dance" (1993) - #34 in France
- "The Sound (Keep Rolling)" (1994)

=== Songs not released as singles ===
- "She Said" (1994)
- "Step By Step" (1995)
- "Dream Of The Night" (1996)
- "Dunga! Dunga!" (1997)

== Members ==
- Luca Galiati
- Jimmy Nicoli
- Mario Borgonovo
- Julia (singer)
