= DJ Kambel =

Kurtis Campbell, better known as DJ Kambel, is a British electronic music DJ. While DJing in the UK happy hardcore scene, he composed many works for the mega-hit compilation Dancemania's Speed series, which made him one of the most frequently appearing artists on the series along with the likes of CJ Crew, Captain Jack, Bus Stop, E-Rotic and Smile.dk.

== Career ==
Born and raised in Nottingham, England, he got involved with DJing and creating music at the age of 11. His musical career officially began in the early 2000s when he signed with major record label Toshiba EMI and began appearing on the label's Dancemania compilation series. His first appearance on the series was on the 2000 album Speed 5. He appeared on the album with his two remixes, one being "Classic Cutz", and the other being "Chariots of Hardcore", along with crews including CJ Crew, Jenny Rom, E-Rotic, Natalie Browne, 2 Unlimited and Smile.dk.

He made a number of appearances on the Speed series in the early 2000s, with his remixes including "Classic Cutz", "Chariots of Hardcore", "Dream State (Spaceman)", "Last Nite Kambel Saved My Life" and "Where's The Noize". Many of his tracks on the series were co-recorded with fellow British experienced MC Magika.

He also made his Bonkers debut in 2003 on Bonkers XI: Forevolution with his track "No More Jokin'". He also made his non-Speed Dancemania debut with his remix of "Right Here Waiting For You" on the 2005 compilation Covers 01, where the crews included Atomic Kitten, Creamy, DJ Miko and CJ Crew.

== Appearances ==
=== Dancemania ===
- Speed : 5 (2000), 6 (2001), 7 (2001), 8 (2002), 9 (2002), 10 (2002)

Speed G : 1 (2003), 2 (2003)
Classical Speed : 1 (2002)

- Covers : 01 (2005)

=== Others ===
- Vibealite - A History Of Hardcore (2003)
- Hardcore Heaven 2 - Reloaded (2003)
- Bonkers XI - Forevolution (2003)
- Original Hardcore: The Nu Breed (2004)
- The Greatest Hardcore: The Hits The Video (2008)
- 100 Anthems: Hardcore Anthems (2009)
