= Die Antwoord discography =

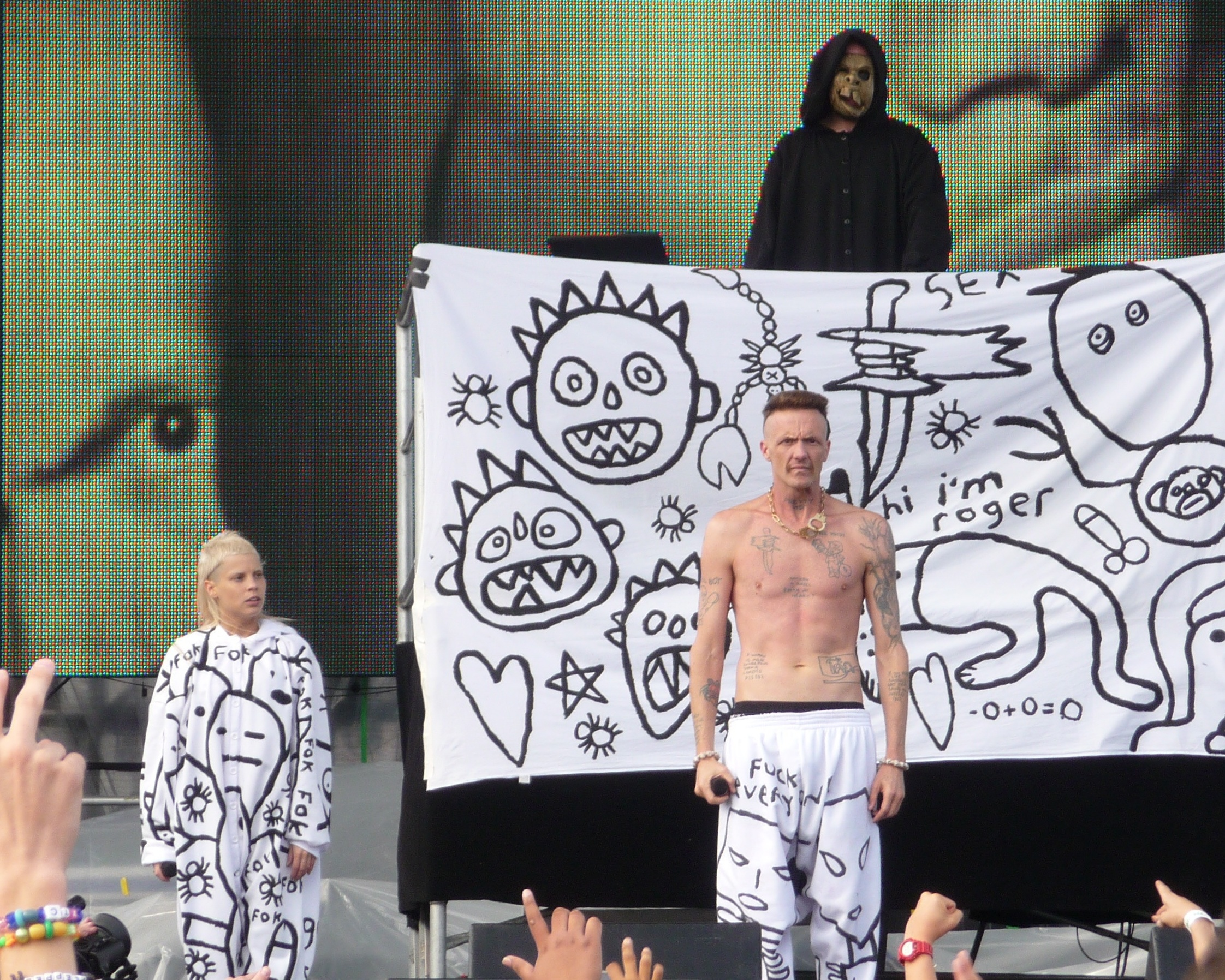
- Die Antwoord performing in 2010
- Studio albums: 5
- EPs: 2
- Mixtapes: 1
- Singles: 29
- Music videos: 21

The discography of South African hip hop duo Die Antwoord consists of five studio albums, two extended plays (EPs), one mixtape, 29 singles, and 21 music videos.

== Studio albums ==
| Title | Album details | Peak chart positions | | | | | | | | | |
| Title | Album details | AUS | BEL (FL) | BEL (WA) | CAN | GER | ITA | NL | NZ | SWI | US |
|---|---|---|---|---|---|---|---|---|---|---|---|
| $O$ | Released: 2009, 12 October 2010 (re-release); Label: Self-released, Cherrytree, Interscope (re-release); Format: MP3, CD, digital download (re-release) | 53 | 67 | — | — | — | — | — | — | — | 109 |
| Ten$ion | Released: 29 January 2012; Label: Zef; Format: CD, LP, digital download | 38 | 40 | 156 | — | — | — | 87 | — | 100 | 143 |
| Donker Mag | Released: 3 June 2014; Label: Zef; Format: CD, LP, digital download | 11 | 26 | 53 | 15 | 95 | — | 49 | 32 | 71 | 37 |
| Mount Ninji and da Nice Time Kid | Released: 16 September 2016; Label: Zef; Format: CD, LP, digital download | 9 | 3 | 14 | 16 | 25 | 53 | 40 | — | 14 | 34 |
| House of Zef | Released: 16 March 2020; Label: Zef; Format: Digital download | — | — | — | — | — | — | — | — | — | — |
| Zama Zama | Released: 20 June 2026; Label: Zef; Format: Digital download | — | — | — | — | — | — | — | — | — | — |
"—" denotes a recording that did not chart or was not released in that territory.

== EPs ==
| Title | Album details | Peak chart positions |
| Title | Album details | US Dance |
|---|---|---|
| 5 | Released: 27 July 2010; Label: Cherrytree, Interscope; Format: CD, digital download | 19 |
| Ekstra | Released: 12 October 2010; Label: Interscope; Format: Digital download | — |
"—" denotes a recording that did not chart or was not released in that territory.

== Mixtapes ==
| Title | Album details | Peak chart positions | |
| Title | Album details | BEL (FL) | US Dance |
|---|---|---|---|
| Suck on This | Released: 19 May 2016; Label: Self-released; Format: Digital download | 143 | 7 |

== Singles ==
| Title | Year | Peak chart positions | | | | | Album |
| Title | Year | AUT | FRA | ITA | UK | US Dance/ Elec. | Album |
|---|---|---|---|---|---|---|---|
| "Wat Pomp" | 2009 | — | — | — | — | — | $O$ |
| "Beat Boy" | 2009 | — | — | — | — | — | $O$ |
| "Enter the Ninja" | 2010 | 45 | — | — | 37 | — | 5 and $O$ |
| "Fish Paste" | 2010 | — | — | — | — | — | 5 and $O$ |
| "Evil Boy" | 2010 | — | — | — | — | — | $O$ |
| "Rich Bitch" | 2011 | — | — | — | — | — | $O$ |
| "Fok Julle Naaiers" | 2011 | — | — | — | — | — | Ten$ion |
| "I Fink U Freeky" | 2012 | — | — | 99 | — | — | Ten$ion |
| "Baby's on Fire" | 2012 | — | — | — | — | — | Ten$ion |
| "Fatty Boom Boom" | 2012 | — | — | — | — | — | Ten$ion |
| "Xp€n$iv $h1t" | 2012 | — | — | — | — | — | Non-album single |
| "Cookie Thumper!" | 2013 | — | — | — | — | — | Donker Mag |
| "Pitbull Terrier" | 2014 | — | — | — | — | — | Donker Mag |
| "Ugly Boy" | 2014 | — | 191 | — | — | — | Donker Mag |
| "Dazed and Confused" (featuring God) | 2016 | — | — | — | — | — | Suck on This |
| "Bum Bum" (featuring God) | 2016 | — | — | — | — | — | Suck on This |
| "Gucci Coochie" (featuring Dita Von Teese, The Black Goat + God) | 2016 | — | — | — | — | — | Suck on This and Mount Ninji and da Nice Time Kid |
| "Banana Brain" | 2016 | — | — | — | — | 30 | Mount Ninji and da Nice Time Kid |
| "We Have Candy" | 2016 | — | — | — | — | — | Mount Ninji and da Nice Time Kid |
| "Fat Faded Fuck Face" | 2016 | — | — | — | — | — | Mount Ninji and da Nice Time Kid |
| "Love Drug" | 2017 | — | — | — | — | — | Non-album singles |
| "Golden Dawn" | 2018 | — | — | — | — | — | Non-album singles |
| "DntTakeMe4aPoes" (featuring G-Boy) | 2019 | — | — | — | — | — | Non-album singles |
| "Baita Jou Sabela" (featuring Slagysta) | 2019 | — | — | — | — | — | Non-album singles |
| "Die Antwoord is Dead" | 2022 | — | — | — | — | — | Non-album singles |
| "Age of Illusion" | 2022 | — | — | — | — | — | Non-album singles |
| "Mfum Mfum" | 2022 | — | — | — | — | — | Non-album singles |
| "Babaji" | 2022 | — | — | — | — | — | Non-album singles |
| "Land of Honey" | 2022 | — | — | — | — | — | Non-album singles |
| "Pokémon" | 2024 | — | — | — | — | — | Non-album singles |
"—" denotes release that did not chart or was not released in that territory.

== Remixes ==
| Title | Year | Peak chart positions | | Album |
| Title | Year | AUT | UK | Album |
|---|---|---|---|---|
| "Pitbull Terrier" (God's Berzerker Trap Remix) | 2016 | — | — | Suck on This |
| "Enter Da Ninja" (The Black Goat Decapitator Remix) | 2016 | — | — | Suck on This |

== Other appearances ==
| Title | Year | Album |
|---|---|---|
| "Spectacular" (Seymour Bits featuring Die Antwoord) | 2010 | Seymour Bits |
| "Dis Iz Why I'm Hot (Herrschaftized)" | 2016 | Time & Dust |

== Music videos ==
| Title | Year | Director(s) |
|---|---|---|
| "Wat Pomp" | 2009 | Die Antwoord |
| "Enter the Ninja" | 2010 | Rob Malpage |
| "Evil Boy" | 2010 | Ninja and Rob Malpage |
| "Rich Bitch" | 2011 | Kobus Holnaaier and Ninja |
| "Fok Julle Naaiers" | 2011 | Ninja and Ross Garrett |
| "I Fink U Freeky" | 2012 | Roger Ballen and Ninja |
| "Baby's on Fire" | 2012 | Ninja and Terence Neale |
| "Fatty Boom Boom" | 2012 | Ninja, Terence Neale and Saki Fokken Bergh |
| "Dis iz Why I'm Hot (zef remix)" | 2012 | Ninja, Clayton Cubitt, Terence Neale, Wang Newton |
| "Cookie Thumper!" | 2013 | Ninja |
| "Pitbull Terrier" | 2014 | Ninja |
| "Ugly Boy" | 2014 | Ninja |
| "Banana Brain" | 2016 | Ninja and Terence Neale |
| "Fat Faded Fuck Face" | 2016 | Yolandi Visser |
| "Love Drug" (Lyric) | 2017 | Ninja and Yolandi Visser |
| "Tommy Can't Sleep" (Short) | 2017 | Yolandi Visser and Roger Ballen |
| "Alien" | 2018 | Ninja |
| "DntTakeMe4aPoes" | 2019 | Yolandi Visser |
| "Baita Jou Sabela" | 2019 | Ninja |
| "Future Baby" | 2020 | Calder Greenwood |
| "Age of Illusion" | 2024 | Jon Day |
| "Zama Zama" | 2026 | Die Antwoord |
