= Dancemania Speed =

Compilation album series

Dancemania Speed is a sub-series of Toshiba EMI's Dancemania compilation series. This series features faster, further remixed versions of recordings from previously released Dancemania albums or faster remixed covers of various famous songs. Unlike the main series mostly consisting of Eurodance, this series largely consists of hardcore techno crews from the UK, the home of happy hardcore, and Eurobeat Artists from Italy

Dancemania Speed

== History ==
The first issue, titled Dancemania Speed, was released on 23 September 1998 with Chumbawamba's "Tubthumping" as its beginning track along with 24 other tracks including Bellini's "Samba de Janeiro", Captain Jack's "Together & Forever", Me & My's "Dub-I-Dub", and E-Rotic's "Willy Use A Billy...Boy". The second issue, Dancemania Speed 2, was released on 3 March 1999 with tracks including "My Heart Will Go On", "Jump", "Butterfly", "Captain Jack", "Turn Me On" and "Techno Wonderland". The albums have appeared on the Oricon charts of best-selling albums since the first was released. Speed 1 reached number 8 in the weekly album chart in October 1998, Speed 2 reached number 7 in the same chart in March 1999 and ranked number 72 in the yearly Top 100 best-selling album chart in 1999 with 322,860 copies sold. Speed 3 reached number 5 in the weekly album chart in September 1999. Several tracks from 1, 2, 3, 4, 5 were later included on the 2000 greatest hits compilation Best 2001 Hyper Nonstop Megamix.

== Releases ==
"Tubthumping"
"Tubthumping" as the first Speed's beginning track

"Techno Wonderland"
"Techno Wonderland", Speed 2's outro track

=== Main series ===
Title	Date	Tracks	Ref
Dancemania Speed	23 September 1998	1. Tubthumping (KCP Remix) by Chumbawamba; 2. Samba De Janeiro (KCP Remix) by Bellini; 3. Time After Time by Vinylgroover; 4. The Key by Dougal & Mickey Skeedale; 5. Together & Forever (KCP Remix) by Captain Jack; 6. Get Up by DJ Kaos & Kevin Energy; 7. Shooting Star by Bang!; 8. Dub-I-Dub (KCP Remix) by Me & My; 9. Is Anybody Out There (Remix) by DJ Ham; 10. Freedom 2 Dance by Brisk & Vinylgroover; 11. Willy Use A Billy ...Boy (KCP Remix) by E-Rotic; 12. Here It Comes (Hardcore Heaven Mix) by DJ Seduction; 13. Flying (Dougal Remix) by DJ Ell & Dream; 14. Hey Yeah by DJ Seduction; 15. 12 Inches Of Love (97 Remix) by DJ Sy & Eruption; 16. On And On (Slipmatt Remix) by Brisk & Ham; 17. Starry Night by Hixxy; 18. Eye Opener by Brisk & Trixxy; 19. Steam Train (DNA '97 Remix) by Dougal & Hopscotch; 20. Here With Me by DJ FX; 21. Volume 5 by Juicy Cuts; 22. Come And Follow Me by DJ Stompy; 23. Get On Up by E-Logic; 24. Tranquillity by Dougal; 25. Muzic (Ham Remix) by Happy Rollers	
Dancemania Speed 2	3 March 1999	1. My Heart Will Go On by Deja Vu Featuring Tasmin; 2. Jump by Bus Stop; 3. Complete Loving by Sound Assassins; 4. Butterfly (Upswing Mix) by Smile.dk; 5. Follow The Sun (90 In The Shade Mix) by Triple J 6. Like A Prayer by Sound Assassins; 7. Smooth & Irresistible by DJ Vinylgroover & Brisk; 8. Hip Swing by DJ DNA; 9. Freedom (Seduction & DNA Remix) by QFX; 10. Captain Jack (Grandale Remix) by Captain Jack; 11. Hardcore Is The Future by Dream Sequence; 12. Clearly by Dream Sequence; 13. Move Ya Feet by DJ Energy; 14. Here I Am (Analogue Mix) by DJ Ham, Demo & Justine Time; 15. Sunshine After The Rain by Go Mental; 16. Don't You Want Me by Joe Bloggs; 17. Turn Me On by E-Rotic; 18. Let's Fly by Breeze; 19. Nothing Compares by DJ Fuze; 20. I Will Always Love You by Sarah Washington; 21. Beats Like These by Unknown Project; 22. Died In Your Arms Tonight (Remix) by Go Mental; 23. Cheddar 4 (Sy & Unknown Remix) by Cheddar; 24. Vol.1 by Silk Cuts; 25. Vol.4 by Ravers Choice; 26. Techno Wonderland by 10 Whites Recordings	
Dancemania Speed 3	8 September 1999	1. I Don't Want To Miss A Thing (Planet Lution Mix) by Deja Vu Feat. Tasmin; 2. Vol. 3-A by Silk Cuts; 3. Boom Boom Dollar (K.O.G. G3 Mix) by King Kong & D'Jungle Girls; 4. Life Is Like A Dance (Dougal & Micky Skeedal Remix) by Dougal & Micky Skeedal; 5. Drill Instructor (C-Jah Happy Mix) by Captain Jack; 6. Show Me The Way by DJ Brisk & Trixxy; 7. Boys (Pess JV Mix) by SMILE.dk; 8. Hold Your Hands To Heaven by DJ Stompy & D'Skys; 9. Have It All (Panoramic Mix) by Triple J#99 Red Balloons by Jimmy J 10. The Beating Of My Heart by DJ Storm; 11. Party Pumper (Billy Bunter Remix) by Brisk vs. Rebel Alliance; 12. Dance With Somebody by DJ DNA; 13. Motorway Madness by DJ Vibes & Wishdokta; 14. Deep In The Underground by Lock Jaw; 15. Imperial March (Remix) by Sy & Unknown; 16. Flashdance (What A Feeling) by Magika Feat. Stixman; 17. Rush Hour (Vinylgroover Remix) by DJ Magical; 18. What's Up 2000 (KCP Grandale Mix) by DJ Miko; 19. Pain In My Heart (KCP Mix) by Carina; 20. Vol. 8-A by Juicy Cuts; 21. Kiss Me (KCP Remix) by E-Rotic; 22. Now Is The Time (DJ Hixxy & Trixxy Remix) by Scott Brown vs. DJ Rabs; 23. Let It Life You (Vibes & Wishdokta Remix) by Billy Bunter & JDS; 24. Eternal Flame by DJ Kaos; 25. Hold Me Now by DJ Kaos; 26. Fly Away by Visa	
Dancemania Speed 4	8 March 2000	1. Brilliant 2U (K.O.G. G3 Mix) by Naoki; 2. Hero (Happy Grandale Mix) by Papaya; 3. Change The World by CJ Crew feat. Blueman; 4. If You Were Here (B4 Za Beat Mix) by Jennifer; 5. SOS by Nancy And The Boys; 6. Eyes on Me Featured In Final Fantasy VIII (Super Planet Mix) by Faye Wong; 7. Want To Be Free by Sedders; 8. Forever by Hixxy & Bananaman; 9. I Believe by DJ Stompy; 10. Sweet Desire by DJ Kaos; 11. Saint Goes Marching (Helix Remix) by The Saint; 12. Superman by DNA & Simon Apex " 13. Go West by Kama-Sutra's Gang; 14. Big Air Head by Brisk; 15. Paradise by DJ Stompy; 16. Dam Dariram (KCP Mix) by Joga; 17. It's Not Over by DJ Seduction & Dougal; 18. Sincerely Yours by DJ Kaos; 19. Dynamite Rave (B4 Za Beat Mix) by Naoki; 20. Samplemania (Brisk Remix) by DJ Seduction; 21. Elevation by DJ Stompy; 22. Have You Never Been Mellow (MM Groovin' Mix) by The Olivia Project; 23. Rainfall Down by Brisk & Vinylgroover; 24. My Destiny by Twist; 25. So Real by Vinylgroover; 26. Gimme Gimme Gimme (Hardcore Mix) by E-Rotic; 27. I Wanna See The Sun (Speed Mix) by Wildside; 28. Run To Me (Brisk Remix) by E-Logic; 29. Oh My God by DJ Wyle; 30. Livin' La Vida Loca by CJ Crew feat. Giorgio	
Dancemania Speed 5	20 September 2000	1. Rhythm and Police (K.O.G G3 Mix) by CJ Crew feat. Christian D 2. Ninzaburo by CJ Crew feat. Sedge; 3. The Final Countdown by Tommy B 4. Hiho (Red Monster Hyper Mix) by Captain Jack; 5. Let It Be by Sound Assassins; 6. WWW.Blonde Girl (Momo Mix) by Jenny Rom; 7. Do It All Night (Grandale Mix) by E-Rotic; 8. Pure Shores by Nancy and The Boys; 9. Maria (Japanese Mix) by DJ Kawasaki; 10. More Than I Needed to Know (Super Planet Mix) by Scooch; 11. Total Eclypse by Sound Assassins; 12. My Favourite Game (Super Planet Mix) by Natalie Browne; 13. Wake Up! by Mr. Dynamite; 14. Take Me Up (DJ Vibes & Wishdokta Remix) by Sub-State; 15. Twilight Zone (B4 Za Beat Mix) by 2 Unlimited; 16. You Know It by The Bandits; 17. Can't Take My Eyes Off You by Beat Box feat. DJ Speedo; 18. Love, Life & Happiness (Ham Mix) by Stealth; 19. Doo-Be-Di-Boy (KCP Mix) by Smile.dk; 20. Checkin' Da Cutz by Brisk & Vinylgroover; 21. Feel Your Love by DJ Stompy & D'Skys; 22. Speedy Love by Speedogang; 23. Hands of Destiny by Cru-L-T & DJ Evil; 24. Sesame's Treet by Smart'es 2000; 25. The New Odyssey (from Obsession) by Vinylgroover; 26. SMD5 by SMD; 27. Make 'Em Bounce by Double Dutch; 28. Kiss It (Psycangle Remix) by Ballistic; 29. Classic Cutz by DJ Kambel; 30. Chariots of Hardcore by DJ Kambel	
Dancemania Speed 6	16 March 2001	1. Dancing All Alone (Kimono Grandale Mix) by Smile.dk; 2. Jumping To Heaven by Judy Crystal; 3. Oh Nick Please Not So Quick by E-Rotic; 4. I Want It That Way by CJ Crew; 5. Can't Stop Fallin' In Love (Ventura Hyper Mix) by Naoki; 6. Lupin The 3rd '78 (Speed K Mix) by Ventura; 7. Get Ready For This (KCP Mix) by 2 Unlimited; 8. Smile For Me by Smiling Jane; 9. Imagine by Sound Assassins; 10. No Where To Hide by DJ Stompy; 11. The Best Days by Northwest; 12. Your Dreams by DJ Stompy; 13. Eternity by Triple J 14. Hymn by DJ Jaxx; 15. Wonderland by Y.Cee; 16. My Generation (Speed Pitch Mix) by Captain Jack; 17. Larger Than Life by CJ Crew; 18. Highway Star by Speedmaster; 19. Up To Eleven by CJ Crew; 20. Bridge Over Troubled Waters by E-Logic; 21. Sha La La by Maria Short; 22. Music by Nancy And The Boys; 23. Witch Doctor (Hyper KCP Mix) by Cartoons; 24. Sound Of The Nations by S & K 25. Wanting To Get High by Hixxy & Sharkey; 26. Falling by DJ Fade & Simon Apex; 27. Let Me Play by Hyperaktive; 28. Flower Needs The Rain by Stealth; 29. Hanky Panky (E=MC2 Mix) by Jenny Rom; 30. Blue Fever by DJ Kambel VS MC Magika	
Dancemania Speed 7	27 September 2001	1. Survivor by Nancy And The Boys; 2. My Fire (KCP Remix) by X-Treme; 3. B4U (B4 Za Beat Mix) by Naoki; 4. Jaded (Remix) by Tommy B.; 5. Footloose (Hyper Mix) by Bus Stop; 6. I Believe In Miracles (Hyper Momo Mix) by Hi-Rise; 7. Doesn't Really Matter by DJ Speedo; 8. I Love You Babe by Priscilla & Judy; 9. Baby Baby Baby by Maria Short; 10. Boom Boom Boom by Judy Crystal; 11. All Around The World (E=MC2 Mix) by The Zippers; 12. Happy Again (S&K Mix) by Smiling Jane; 13. 1, 2, 3, 4, 007 (Speed Pop Mix) by Ni-Ni; 14. Robin Robin Hood (Speed Version) by Jenny Rom; 15. Walkie Talkie (Momo Mix) by King Kong & D'Jungle Girls; 16. Let The Beat Control Your Body (B4 Za Beat Speed Mix) by 2 Unlimited; 17. Queen Of Love by Wildside; 18. Sweet Dreams X-Clusive by BPM; 19. I Need Your Lovin by Vinylgroover & Trixxy; 20. Sexual Healing (Planet Lution Mix) by E-Rotic; 21. Born Slippy by CJ Crew; 22. Born To Rave by DJ Stompy; 23. Vortex by DJ Fade; 24. Play The Vibes by Adiktion; 25. The Race (Power Drill Mix) by Captain Jack; 26. Going To Suzuka (Shoemaker Mix) by S & K 27. Mindblowin by Brisk & Fade; 28. Hero 2001 by Alk-E-D; 29. Crash by Luna-C#Dream State (Spaceman) by DJ Kambel vs. MC Magika	
Dancemania Speed 8	6 March 2002	1. There You'll Be by DJ Speedo; 2. Long Train Runnin' (Ventura Mix) by Bus Stop; 3. Telephone Operator (K.O.G G3 Mix) by Pete Shelley; 4. Sky High (Speed Mix) by DJ Miko; 5. Upside Down (Y&Co. Speed Mix) by Coo Coo; 6. Love & Love by Judy & Priscilla; 7. Party Time (Speedy Mix) by S & K 8. Speed Japan by Wildside; 9. Livin' In America by Rose & John; 10. Waka Laka (E=MC2 Mix) by Jenny Rom & The Zippers; 11. That's The Way (KCP Remix) by X-Treme; 12. Stop In The Name Of Love by Amelia B.; 13. Miles Away (Hard Mix) by 3rd Source; 14. Lady Marmalade by Nancy And The Boys; 15. Still In My Heart (Momo Mix) by Naoki; 16. Happiness (Speed Mix) by The Zippers; 17. The Game Of Love (E=MC2 Mix) by Jenny Rom; 18. Follow Me (Hi-Score Remix) by Captain Jack; 19. Gotta Get It Groovin' (KCP Remix) by E-Rotic; 20. Rise To The Occasion by Connie And The Plainsman; 21. I'll Never Let You Go by DJ Stompy; 22. One More Time by CJ Crew; 23. Movin' On by Double Dutch; 24. Serious Hardcore by Brisk & Ham; 25. Now Is The Time 2000 by Scott Brown; 26. Sun Always Shines by Mr. X 27. Power Of Love 2001 by Q-Tex; 28. Hold On by Trixxy; 29. Somewhere Over The Rainbow (DJ Kambel Remix) by Cosmic Gate; 30. Last Nite Kambel Saved My Life by DJ Kambel Vs MC Magika	
Dancemania Speed 9	26 September 2002	1. Irresistiblement by Wildside; 2. Cartoon Heroes (Speedy Mix) by Barbie Young; 3. Smile (Speedy Mix) by Orlando; 4. Max Don't Have Sex With Your Ex (Grandale Mix) by E-Rotic; 5. Crazy by DJ Stompy; 6. Test Of Time by DJ Stompy; 7. Baby Love Me (Speed Mix) by Judy Crystal; 8. Speed Over Beethoven by Rose; 9. Love Shine A "Speedy" Light (Speed Mix) by Speedmaster; 10. Burnin' The Floor (Momo Mix) by Naoki; 11. Synths 'N' Stuff by Techno-Phonic; 12. People Hold On by Sound Assassins; 13. Na-Na (KCP Remix) by Bus Stop; 14. Do It Like This by Chi K Monkey; 15. Fields Of Gold by CJ Crew; 16. Push It by CJ Crew; 17. Don't Tell Me by Nancy And The Boys; 18. Soul Bossa Nova (KCP Remix) by X-Treme; 19. Back In My Life by Mr. X 20. Take Me Out To The Ball Game (Planet Remix) by Captain Jack; 21. This Beat Has Gotcha by MC Bygglz; 22. Time After Time (Remix) by Sound Assassins; 23. Nights In Heaven – Days In Hell (Lution Remix) by Missing Heart; 24. Ultimate Sounds by Robbie Long & Coyote; 25. Delirious by Double Dutch; 26. Control Your Mind by Brisk & DJ Fade; 27. Senorita (Speedy Mix) by Jenny Rom; 28. Everybody (Speedy Mix) by S & K 29. Where's The Noize by DJ Kambel; 30. Flashdance (What A Feeling) 2002 (DJ Kambel Remix) by DJ Kambel vs. MC Magika	
Dancemania Speed 10	18 December 2002	1. Complicated by Nancy And The Boys; 2. A Little Less Conversation by CJ Crew; 3. Wild Child by CJ Crew; 4. Private Eyes by Tommy B.; 5. Give It Up (Grandale Mix) by Captain Jack; 6. Relax by Speedmaster; 7. Mas Que Nada (KCP Remix) by X-Treme; 8. I Do I Do I Do (KCP Remix) by Creamy; 9. Ika Uka (E=MC2 Mix) by Jenny Rom; 10. Champagne Supernova by Sound Assassins; 11. Get The Party Started by Nancy And The Boys; 12. Sweet by DJ Evil; 13. Fly With You by DJ Fade; 14. Eyeopener (Scott Brown's Earcloser Remix) by Brisk & Trixxy; 15. Everyday by Wine; 16. Heaven Is A Place On Earth by Wildside; 17. Joy To The World by Orlando; 18. Sabre Dance by Blue Venice; 19. DropTop by Double Dutch; 20. Here Come The Noize by Double Dutch; 21. Radio Rockin' by Brisk & Fade; 22. Want Your Love by Brisk & Fade; 23. Here To Stay by DJ Stompy; 24. September by DJ Speedo; 25. L.O.V.E. (Sex On The Beach) (Lution Remix) by E-Rotic; 26. Get Up'N Move (Speed Mix) by S & K 27. Carmen Prelude by Violent String Ensemble; 28. Feel The Beat by DJ Kambel VS MC Magika; 29. Brainstorm by DJ Kambel VS MC Magika; 30. Candy (Star) (Planet Remix) by Luv Unlimited	

=== G series ===
Title	Date	Ref
Dancemania Speed G	21 May 2003	
Dancemania Speed G 2	27 November 2003	
Dancemania Speed G 3	23 June 2004	
Dancemania Speed G 4	30 March 2005	
Dancemania Speed G 5	30 September 2005	

=== Others ===
Title	Date	Ref
Dancemania Speed Best 2001 Hyper Nonstop Megamix	29 November 2000	
Dancemania Speed Presents Happy Ravers	31 January 2001	
Dancemania Speed Presents Trance Ravers	19 December 2001	
Classical Speed	11 December 2002	
Dancemania Speed: Best of Hardcore	3 March 2003	
Speed SFX	18 September 2003	
Christmas Speed	29 October 2003	
Dancemania Speed TV	28 April 2004	
Classical Speed 2	18 August 2004	
Speed Deka	25 November 2004	
Anime Speed	25 May 2005	
Speedrive	31 March 2006	
Anime Speed Newtype edition	19 July 2006	
Happy Speed Best of Dancemania Speed Giga	18 April 2007	
