= Dub-I-Dub =

Single by Me & My

from the album Me & My
- B-side: "Remix"
- Released: 24 August 1995
- Genre: Eurodance
- Length: 3:21
- Label: EMI
- Songwriters: Susanne Georgi; Pernille Georgi
- Producers: Johnny Jam; Dean 'N

Me & My singles chronology
"Dub-I-Dub" (1995)	"Baby Boy" (1995)

Music video
- "Dub-I-Dub" on YouTube

"Dub-I-Dub" is the debut single by Danish Eurodance duo and sisters Me & My, released in August 1995 by EMI Records from their eponymous album (1995). It was written by the sisters, Susanne and Pernille Georgi, and produced by Johnny Jam and Dean 'N. It feature the prominent use of the non-lexical hooks Dub-i-dub-i-dub-i-dub-dub-dub. The single achieved success on the charts in many countries, peaking at number-one in Denmark and Japan. It also became a top-10 hit in countries like Belgium, Hungary, Iceland, Israel, Italy, Mexico, Russia, Spain and Sweden. Following the success of the single in Japan, Me & My also became the best-selling artist of 1995 there. Since its release, the duo have sold more than one million singles of "Dub-I-Dub" worldwide. Its music video was directed by Peter Ravn, featuring Me & My as milkmaids and nurses.

== Background and release ==
Danish sisters Susanne and Pernille Georgi began their careers in 1988 as childstars in the duo SuPer Sisters (the word "SuPer" being a compound of the two singers' first names), performing at nursing homes and touring Denmark. In 1989 and 1990, they released two Danish-language albums and performed at Danish television.

"Dub-I-Dub" was created in the back seat of a taxi after a late night in the city for Susanne. She rang up her sister Pernille the following morning and sang it to her, and they finished it together. It was originally thought as a balllad, but after it was sent to Danish producer Dean 'N, it was transformed into a Eurodance track. Susanne told in a 2016 interview, that it happened one evening, where she herself sat at a party and came up with 'something with dub-i-dub'. She subsequently recorded it on a cassette tape. "We sent that to our producer at the time, who had a completely different version made. But we couldn't come up with any text at all. It was a slightly groovy soul version, then he got his hands on it, and it became much cooler. A dance version. Then it developed, but we just couldn't come up with anything (the text)."

At that time, the sisters were already managed by John Aagaard, but they didn't have a recording deal as yet. Aagaard told in 1995, "When I first heard it, I was sure I had the biggest summer hit of 1995 in my hands. Finally the girls came up with the track that I needed to secure a label deal. The only thing I had to do then was to hook them up with the right producers. Dean Nielsen and Johnny Jam were my men for the job." Aagaard then unleashed a bidding war after sending the track to all the record companies in Denmark, which all wanted to sign the sisters. EMI Records ended up as the final winner, the sisters took the new name Me & My and within a month, "Dub-I-Dub" was number 1 in Denmark. Radio stations ABC/Randers and The Voice were the first to playlist the single in Denmark, even before the official release.

== Critical reception ==
Upon the release, Larry Flick from Billboard magazine wrote, "Popsters with a penchant for Euro-styled dance music are gonna love this one." He added that "this cute and oh-so-perky female duo romps through this NRGetic jam with infectious glee. First released in Denmark earlier this year, this anthemic track has already earned major props from club spinners and radio programmers throughout much of the world, and it looks like the U.S. will wisely follow suit. Some singles just define the carefree fun of the summer season ... this is one of 'em." Pan-European magazine Music & Media commented, "Doop-E-Doop-E-Doop, We're The Scat-women." And again a scatdance product is coming to you from Denmark. How long will it take before DJs across Europe join in with the chorus?". Music & Media editor Robbert Tilli praised it as a "irresistible summery sing-along", noting that "for the second time this year the whole nation of Denmark is scatting like mad."

Head of music Marc Deschuyter by BRTN Radio Donna/Brussels was the first outside Denmark to report the song. He said, "It's the definition of the summer holiday radio format. My reaction to it was the same as when I first heard Nina's 'The Reason Is You', a German singer who went to number 1 in Belgium." A reviewer from Music Week gave 'Dub-I-Dub' three out of five, stating that "the bouncing pop-corny sound of Me & My is bound to get punters singing along, a la MCA's Scatman John." Upon the 1996 re-release, the magazine gave the song four out of five, complimenting it as a "catchy pop number". James Hamilton from the RM Dance Update described it as an "irritating Eurovision-ish chirpy girls cooed and chanted galloping Continental hit" in his weekly dance column.

== Chart performance ==
"Dub-I-Dub" was very successful in Europe, Asia and North-America. It peaked at number-one in the duo's homeland Denmark and in Japan, and number two in Sweden and on the RPM Dance/Urban chart in Canada. It became a top-10 hit also in Belgium (5), Hungary (6), Iceland (6), Israel (10), Italy (5), and Spain (10). In Sweden, it spent four weeks inside the top 10 and was held off reaching the number-one position by "Fiskarna i haven" by Swedish singer Idde Schultz. Additionally, "Dub-I-Dub" was a top-20 hit in Austria (11), Finland (16), Norway (12), and Switzerland (14), a top-30 hit in the Netherlands, a top-40 hit in Germany, and a top-50 hit in France. In the UK, the single didn't chart inside the UK Singles Chart's Top 100, reaching only number 148. On the Eurochart Hot 100, it peaked at number 28 in October 1995, after eleven weeks on the chart. It ended up as number 84 on its year-end chart. The song also achieved success in Mexico and Russia, becoming a top-5 hit there, while in Australia, it only reached number 135 on the ARIA singles chart.

"Dub-I-Dub" earned a platinum record in Denmark, after 8000 singles were sold. Since its release, Me & My have sold more than one million singles worldwide.

== Music video ==
The accompanying music video for "Dub-I-Dub" was directed by Danish artist Peter Ravn. It features Me & My as milkmaids, milking a brown Danish cow. Other scenes features the sisters as beauty salon workers and nurses as well as close-ups of their lips synching the song's chorus. The video was later published on Warner Music Denmark's official YouTube channel in February 2009, and had generated more than 13 million views as of late 2025.

== Remixes ==
The single was the subject of multiple remixes and was included on band's best of The Ultimate Collection, released in 2007. "Dub-I-Dub" was used in video games, such as Dance Dance Revolution 2ndMix, Dancing Stage EuroMix, Dance Dance Revolution Party Collection, and Dance Dance Revolution X.

"KCP remix" version has appeared on Dancemania's Speed series. This happy hardcore version is much faster than any other version of "Dub-I-Dub", at 170 BPM. The first appearance was on the first issue of the series, Speed 1. This was later included on the 2000 greatest hits album of the series, Dancemania Speed Best 2001 Hyper Nonstop Megamix.

== Track listings ==
- CD single
1. "Dub I Dub" (radio mix) – 3:21
2. "Dub I Dub" (club remix) – 5:19
- CD maxi
1. "Dub-I-Dub" (radio mix) – 3:21
2. "Dub-I-Dub" (MG radio remix) – 4:06
3. "Dub-I-Dub" (club remix) – 5:19
4. "Dub-I-Dub" (underground dub) – 5:32
5. "Dub-I-Dub" (boomin' club remix) – 6:24
- 12" maxi
1. "Dub-I-Dub" (extended version) – 4:30
2. "Dub-I-Dub" (club remix) – 5:18
3. "Dub-I-Dub" (underground dub) – 5:32
4. "Dub-I-Dub" (boomin' club remix) – 6:24
- CD single - promo
1. "Dub-I-Dub" (radio mix) – 3:21
- 12" maxi - promo
1. "Dub-I-Dub" (Diddy's Indian summer mix) – 6:04
2. "Dub-I-Dub" (club remix) – 5:18
3. "Dub-I-Dub" (Madame X mix) – 8:56
4. "Dub-I-Dub" (Andy Allder mix) – 6:39

== Credits ==
- Music, lyrics and vocals by Pernille Georgi and Susanne Georgi
- Arranged by Dean 'N
- Engineered by Johnny Jam
- Mixed and produced by Dean 'N and Johnny Jam

== Charts ==
=== Weekly charts ===
Chart (1995–1996)	Peak position
Australia (ARIA)	135
Austria (Ö3 Austria Top 40)	11
Belgium (Ultratop 50 Flanders)	5
Belgium (Ultratop 50 Wallonia)	9
Canada Dance/Urban (RPM)	2
Denmark (IFPI)	1
Europe (Eurochart Hot 100)	28
Europe (European Hit Radio)	33
Finland (Suomen virallinen lista)	16
France (SNEP)	43
Germany (Media Control Charts)	37
Hungary (Mahasz)	6
Iceland (Íslenski Listinn Topp 40)	6
Israel (Israeli Singles Chart)	10
Italy (Musica e dischi)	5
Japan (Oricon)	1
Netherlands (Dutch Top 40)	27
Netherlands (Single Top 100)	25
Norway (VG-lista)	12
Quebec (ADISQ)	41
Spain (AFYVE)	10
Sweden (Sverigetopplistan)	2
Switzerland (Schweizer Hitparade)	14
UK Singles (OCC)	148

=== Year-end charts ===
Chart (1995)	Position
Belgium (Ultratop 50 Flanders)	51
Belgium (Ultratop 50 Wallonia)	69
Europe (Eurochart Hot 100)	84
Iceland (Íslenski Listinn Topp 40)	94
Sweden (Topplistan)	52

== Certification ==
Region	Certification	Certified units/sales
Denmark (IFPI Danmark)	Platinum	8,000^{^}
^{^} Shipments figures based on certification alone.
