= Rich Bitch =

Rich Bitch may refer to:

- "Rich Bitch", a song by South African duo Die Antwoord on their album $O$
- "Rich Bitch", a song by Australian rock band The Screaming Jets on their album Tear of Thought
