= Andorra in the Eurovision Song Contest 2009 =

- Eurovision Song Contest 2009
- Participating broadcaster: Ràdio i Televisió d'Andorra (RTVA)
- Country: Andorra
- Selection process: Passaport a Moscou
- Selection date: 4 February 2009

Competing entry
- Song: "La teva decisió (Get a Life)"
- Artist: Susanne Georgi
- Songwriters: Susanne Georgi; Rune Braager; Lene Dissing; Pernille Georgi; Marcus Winther-John; Josep Roca Vila

Placement
- Semi-final result: Failed to qualify (15th)

Participation chronology

Andorra was represented at the Eurovision Song Contest 2009 with the song "La teva decisió (Get a Life)", written by Susanne Georgi, Rune Braager, Lene Dissing, Pernille Georgi, Marcus Winther-John, and Josep Roca Vila, and performed by Georgi herself. The Andorran participating broadcaster, Ràdio i Televisió d'Andorra (RTVA), organised the national final Passaport a Moscou in order to select its entry for the contest. Three songs performed during the national final on 4 February 2009 where a combination of jury voting and public voting selected "La teva decisió (Get a Life)" performed by Susanne Georgi as the winner.

Andorra was drawn to compete in the first semi-final of the Eurovision Song Contest which took place on 12 May 2009. Performing during the show in position 7, "La teva decisió (Get a Life)" was not announced among the 10 qualifying entries of the first semi-final and therefore did not qualify to compete in the final. It was later revealed that Andorra placed fifteenth out of the 18 participating countries in the semi-final with 8 points.

As of 2026, this was Andorra's last entry in the contest, before RTVA opted out of participating the following year. The absence has continued in every edition since.

== Background ==
Prior to the 2009 contest, Ràdio i Televisió d'Andorra (RTVA) had participated in the Eurovision Song Contest representing Andorra five times since its first entry in 2004. To this point, it has yet to feature in a final, with their best result being in 2007 with the song "Salvem el món" performed by Anonymous which placed twelfth out of the 28 entries in the semi-final, while their worst result was achieved in 2006 where they placed twenty-third (last) out of the 23 entries in the semi-final with the song "Sense tu" by Jenny. In the 2008 contest, Andorra failed to qualify to the final where they placed sixteenth out of the 19 entries in the semi-final with the song "Casanova" performed by Gisela.

As part of its duties as participating broadcaster, RTVA organises the selection of its entry in the Eurovision Song Contest and broadcasts the event in the country. The broadcaster confirmed its intentions to participate at the 2009 contest on 10 September 2008. In 2004 and 2005, RTVA had set up a national final in order to select its entry, while an internal selection was used since 2006. On 22 October 2008, RTVA announced that it would return with organising a national final to select the 2009 entry.

== Before Eurovision ==
=== Passaport a Moscou ===
Passaport a Moscou (Passport to Moscow) was the national final organised by RTVA to select its entry for the Eurovision Song Contest 2009. The competition took place on 4 February 2009 at the Apolo Andorra Hall in Andorra la Vella, hosted by Meri Picart and broadcast on ATV as well as online via the broadcaster's Eurovision Song Contest website eurovisionandorra.ad.

==== Competing entries ====
A submission period was open for artists and composers to submit their entries between 24 October 2008 and 31 December 2008, which was later pushed forward to 1 December 2008. Artists were required to be aged at least 18 and were able to submit up to three songs, at least one of them being in Catalan. Both artists and songwriters could be of any nationality, but those with Andorran citizenship, musical experience and fluency in Catalan, English, and French were given priority. A total of 107 submissions were received at the conclusion of the submission period, of which 41 were submitted from Andorra, 27 from Spain, eight each from France and Lithuania, six from Sweden, four each from Greece and Malta, three from Belgium, two each from Ireland and Israel, and one each from Iceland and the United Kingdom. 64 songs were submitted without an artist attached, 28 artists applied with a song and 15 artists applied without a song. RTVA shortlisted fifteen songs without an artist attached, five artists that applied without a song and four artists that applied with a song, while an eight-member expert committee chaired by general director of RTVA Enric Castellet selected three entries for the national final, which were announced on 13 December 2008.

On 29 December 2008, "Estrelles d'or", written by Marc Durandeau and performed by Marc Durandeau and Marc Canturri, was disqualified from the national final due to similarities with Durandeau's submitted song for the 2008 Spanish national final "Estrellas en azul" and replaced with the song "Passió obsessiva" performed by Mar Capdevila. Prior to the national final, RTVA broadcast three presentation shows on 14, 21 and 28 January 2009 where the three entries were presented to the public.

Artist	Song	Songwriter(s)
Mar Capdevila	"Passió obsessiva"	Josep Roca; José Juan Santana; Gonzalo Vandelvira
Lluís Cartes	"Exhaust"	Lluís Cartes
Susanne Georgi	"La teva decisió"	Susanne Georgi; Rune Braager; Lene Dissing; Pernille Georgi; Marcus Winther-John; Josep Roca Vila

==== Final ====
The final took place on 4 February 2009. Three entries competed and the winner, "La teva decisió" performed by Susanne Georgi, was selected by the 50/50 combination of votes from a professional jury and a public televote that ran between 14 January and 4 February 2009. In addition to the performances of the competing entries, the show featured an interval act from actor Frank Prieto.

Final – 4 February 2009
R/O	Artist	Song	Jury (50%)	Televote (50%)	Total	Place
1	Susanne Georgi	"La teva decisió"	47%	66%	56.5%	1
2	Mar Capdevila	"Passió obsessiva"	23%	13%	18%	3
3	Lluís Cartes	"Exhaust"	30%	21%	25.5%	2

=== Promotion ===
Susanne Georgi made several appearances across Europe to specifically promote "La teva decisió" as the Andorran Eurovision entry. On 27 February, Georgi appeared in and performed during the Punto Radio programme Protagonistas in Spain. Georgi also took part in promotional activities in Denmark which included a performance at the Danish Music Awards on 28 February. On 12 May, Georgi performed "La teva decisió" during a special Eurovision show on Televisión Española (TVE).

== At Eurovision ==
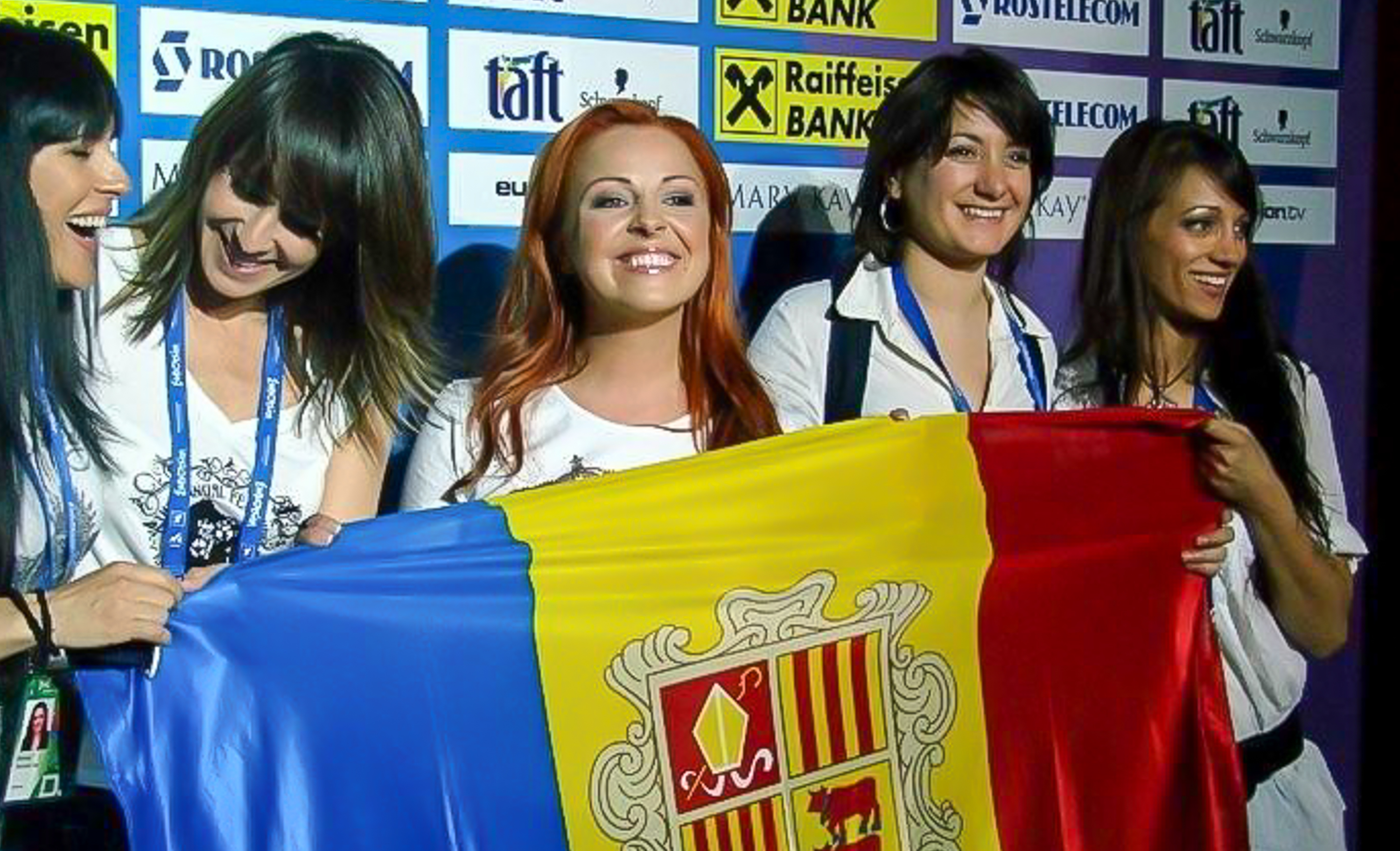
Susanne Georgi with her backing vocalists during a press meet and greet

According to Eurovision rules, all nations with the exceptions of the host country and the "Big Four" (France, Germany, Spain and the United Kingdom) are required to qualify from one of two semi-finals in order to compete for the final; the top nine songs from each semi-final as determined by televoting progress to the final, and a tenth was determined by back-up juries. The European Broadcasting Union (EBU) split up the competing countries into six different pots based on voting patterns from previous contests, with countries with favourable voting histories put into the same pot. On 30 January 2009, a special allocation draw was held which placed each country into one of the two semi-finals. Andorra was placed into the first semi-final, to be held on 12 May 2009. The running order for the semi-finals was decided through another draw on 16 March 2009 and Andorra was set to perform in position 12, following the entry from Armenia and before the entry from Switzerland.

The two semi-finals and the final were broadcast in Andorra on ATV with commentary by Meri Picart. RTVA appointed Brigits García as its spokesperson to announce the Andorran votes during the final.

=== Controversy ===
Having originally been drawn to broadcast and vote in the first semi-final, the EBU's Reference Group approved a request by Spanish broadcaster TVE in April 2009 for Spain to broadcast and vote in the second semi-final instead due to their commitments to broadcasting the Madrid Open tennis tournament and to allow for promotion of Eurovision itself. RTVA announced their disappointment on this decision as they believed that Andorra's chances of qualifying would be lower without Spain voting, while there was also a feeling that the amount of promotion done in Spain was to no avail.

=== Semi-final ===
Susanne Georgi took part in technical rehearsals on 3 and 7 May, followed by dress rehearsals on 11 and 12 May. The Andorran performance featured Susanne Georgi wearing a white long-sleeved blouse and white skirt with a red heart in the corner, joined on stage by four backing vocalists. The performers moved around the stage throughout the song, while Georgi and two of the backing vocalists played a white electric guitar with the number 07 lit up. The LED screens displayed expanding red and blue blocks, floating electric guitars and flashing blocks of different colours, while the performance also featured the use of a wind machine. The four backing vocalists that joined Susanne Georgi were: Belinda Sánchez Leal, María Ángeles Barahona Paisan, Olga Romero Paz and Susana Ribalta.

At the end of the show, Andorra was not announced among the top 10 entries in the first semi-final and therefore failed to qualify to compete in the final. It was later revealed that Andorra placed fifteenth in the semi-final, receiving a total of 8 points.

=== Voting ===
The voting system for 2009 involved each country awarding points from 1-8, 10 and 12, with the points in the final being decided by a combination of 50% national jury and 50% televoting. Each nation's jury consisted of five music industry professionals who are citizens of the country they represent. This jury judged each entry based on: vocal capacity; the stage performance; the song's composition and originality; and the overall impression by the act. In addition, no member of a national jury was permitted to be related in any way to any of the competing acts in such a way that they cannot vote impartially and independently.

Below is a breakdown of points awarded to Andorra and awarded by Andorra in the first semi-final and grand final of the contest. The nation awarded its 12 points to Portugal in the semi-final and to Spain in the final of the contest.

==== Points awarded to Andorra ====
Points awarded to Andorra (Semi-final 1)
Score	Country
12 points	
10 points	
8 points	
7 points	
6 points	
5 points	
4 points	Portugal
3 points	Malta
2 points	
1 point	Turkey

==== Points awarded by Andorra ====
Points awarded by Andorra (Semi-final 1)
Score	Country
12 points	Portugal
10 points	Iceland
8 points	Israel
7 points	Sweden
6 points	Malta
5 points	Turkey
4 points	Romania
3 points	Finland
2 points	Switzerland
1 point	Montenegro

Points awarded by Andorra (Final)
Score	Country
12 points	Spain
10 points	Norway
8 points	Iceland
7 points	Israel
6 points	Portugal
5 points	Denmark
4 points	United Kingdom
3 points	France
2 points	Sweden
1 point	Malta

==== Detailed voting results ====
Detailed voting results from Andorra (Final)
R/O	Country	Results			Points
R/O	Country	Jury	Televoting	Combined	Points
01	Lithuania				
02	Israel	6	7	13	7
03	France		6	6	3
04	Sweden		4	4	2
05	Croatia				
06	Portugal		12	12	6
07	Iceland	10	5	15	8
08	Greece				
09	Armenia				
10	Russia				
11	Azerbaijan				
12	Bosnia and Herzegovina	2		2	
13	Moldova				
14	Malta	4		4	1
15	Estonia				
16	Denmark	12		12	5
17	Germany				
18	Turkey	3		3	
19	Albania				
20	Norway	7	8	15	10
21	Ukraine				
22	Romania		3	3	
23	United Kingdom	8	1	9	4
24	Finland	1	2	3	
25	Spain	5	10	15	12

== After Eurovision ==
Despite having submitted a preliminary application to participate in the Eurovision Song Contest 2010, RTVA announced that their withdrawal on 12 December 2009 after they were unable to secure extra funds by 11 December due to a 10% reduction in their spending budget for 2010. Following the announcement, many former Andorran Eurovision contestants expressed their disappointment in the broadcaster's decision due to the lack of publicity the country will now receive by not taking part in the contest.

Andorra has not returned to the contest since.
