= Dancemania X1 =

Compilation album by various artists
- Released: January 13, 1999
- Genres: Electronic, pop (Europop, Euro house, Italo dance)
- Length: 76:00
- Label: EMI Music Japan
- Producers: Masaaki Saito (executive producer); Hiro Kadoma (producer)

Dancemania chronology
10 (1998)	Dancemania X1 (1999)	X2 (1999)

Dancemania X1, a.k.a. Dancemania 11, is the eleventh set in the Dancemania series of dance music compilation albums, released in 1999 by EMI Music Japan.

The album debuted at #4 on Oricon's weekly album chart in January 1999, reached #2 in February 1999, and appeared on the yearly best-selling album chart at #77 in 1999 with 304,710 copies sold, along with several other Dancemania albums such as Speed 2 being #72 and Delux 3 being #88.

Several tracks on the album, including different remixes, can also be found on other Dancemania albums such as Disco Groove, Delux 3, Delux 4, Diamond, Diamond Complete Edition, Best Yellow, Best Red, Zip Mania II, Zip Mania Best, Fura Mania, Speed 2, Speed 3, Speed 7, Speed Best 2001 or Happy Paradise.

== Tracks ==
#	Track	By	Ref
1	Kiss Me	E-Rotic	
2	Supergirl	Papaya	
3	September (Rap Mix)	X-Treme	
4	I Believe In Miracles	Hi-Rise	
5	Jump	Bus Stop	
6	Hot Stuff	Who's Eddie	
7	Save Tonight	Jackie 'O'	
8	Boys	Smile.dk	
9	In My Dreams	Rebecca	
10	Love Reaction	A. Kay-B.J.	
11	Little Angela	Wienna	
12	Hardly Time	Luxury	
13	Dream Dream Dream	Lena	
14	Love	Sonic Dream	
15	To Love You More	Rapport feat. Rochelle	
16	My Heart Will Go On	Booshida	
17	Everybody	Evelyn	
18	In The Name of Love	Infinity feat. Roxanne Price	
19	Bam Bam Bam	Bambee	
20	I Wanna Give You My Heart	Sary	
21	Sex Is A Thrill With The Pill	Sex Appeal	
22	Touch Me Now	Radiorama	
23	Never Give Up	Blackforce	
24	Paradise	Sabia	

== Further details ==
"Supergirl" (#2)
by Papaya - also included on her album Pink.

The album's full length is 76:00.

The longest track is "Kiss Me" (#1) at 4:18.
The shortest track is "Everybody" (#17) at 2:34.

The album's overall average tempo is 138 bpm;

The fastest track is "Paradise" (#24) at 150 bpm.
The lowest bpm is 128; #3–4

Several tracks are cover versions or remix versions.

#3 "September (Rap Mix)" is a remix of Earth, Wind & Fire's "September".
#4 "I Believe In Miracles" is a remix / cover of The Jackson Sisters' "Miracles".
#5 "Jump" is a cover of Van Halen's "Jump".
#6 "Hot Stuff" is a cover of Donna Summer's "Hot Stuff".
#7 "Save Tonight" is a cover of Eagle-Eye Cherry's "Save Tonight".
#15 "To Love You More" is a cover of Celine Dion's "To Love You More".
#16 "My Heart Will Go On" is a cover of Celine Dion's "My Heart Will Go On".

The non-stop mixing was done by Mitsugu Matsumoto, a member of the DJ team MST.

#	Track	Length	BPM	Ref	Artist(s)	From or based in	Ref
1	Kiss Me	4:18	140		E-Rotic	Germany	
2	Supergirl	2:55	137		Papaya	Denmark	
3	September (Rap Mix)	2:52	128		X-Treme	Italy	
4	I Believe In Miracles	3:31	128		Hi-Rise	United Kingdom	
5	Jump	3:09	132		Bus Stop	United Kingdom	
6	Hot Stuff	3:37	132		Who's Eddie	(Republic of Ireland) Ireland	
7	Save Tonight	3:09	133		Jackie 'O'	United Kingdom	
8	Boys	2:39	138		Smile.dk	Sweden	
9	In My Dreams	2:57	139		Rebecca	United Kingdom	
10	Love Reaction	2:56	139		A. Kay-B.J.	Italy	
11	Little Angela	3:12	140		Wienna	Italy	
12	Hardly Time	2:45	140		Luxury	Italy	
13	Dream Dream Dream	2:51	140		Lena	Italy	
14	Love	3:10	129		Sonic Dream	Sweden	
15	To Love You More	2:59	129		Rapport feat. Rochelle	United Kingdom	
16	My Heart Will Go On	3:37	133		Booshida	Italy	
17	Everybody	2:34	137		Evelyn	Sweden	
18	In The Name of Love	2:53	145		Infinity feat. Roxanne Price	Germany	
19	Bam Bam Bam	3:11	145		Bambee	Norway	
20	I Wanna Give You My Heart	3:19	145		Sary	Italy	
21	Sex Is A Thrill With The Pill	3:42	147		Sex Appeal	Germany	
22	Touch Me Now	3:29	147		Radiorama	Italy	
23	Never Give Up	2:43	147		Blackforce	Germany	
24	Paradise	3:44	150		Sabia	Italy	
