= Dancemania Covers =

Album

Dancemania Covers is a sub-series of the Dancemania compilation series, with various famous songs covered by various dance music acts.

Dancemania Covers

== Releases ==
=== Dancemania Covers ===
Dancemania Covers was released on July 16, 1997.

#	Track	Original artist	Cover crew	Ref
1	I Can't Tell You Why	Eagles	In Deep feat. Max Who	
2	Don't Speak	Eric Stefani / Gwen Stefani	Vaneesa Stone	
3	Karma Chameleon	Culture Club	Shark	
4	Scatman (Ski-Ba-Bop-Ba-Dop-Bop)	Scatman	The Axel Boys Quartet	
5	Body Talk	Imagination	EX-IT	
6	Girl You Know It's True	Milli Vanilli	Centory feat. Trey. D.	
7	Let Love Rule	Lenny Kravitz	Chemistry	
8	When Will I See You Again (Devox Divaz Precious Moments Mix)	Gamble and Huff	Devox feat. Angie B.Stone	
9	Boogie Oogie Oogie	A Taste of Honey	Think Twice	
10	I Can Make You Feel Good (THE RAPIANO BROTHERS EDIT)	Shalamar	Kavana	
11	Give It Up	KC and the Sunshine Band	Cut 'N' Move	
12	Reggae Night	La Toya Jackson	Beat System	
13	Can You Feel It?	The Jacksons	Fever feat. Tippa Irie	
14	Let's All Chant	Michael Zager Band	Happy People	
15	That's The Way (I Like It)	KC and the Sunshine Band	Look Twice	
16	Mission ImpossIble	Lalo Schifrin	Mission X	
17	Voulez Vous	ABBA	Abbacadabra	
18	I Was Made For Loving You	KISS	Heart Attack	
19	Take On Me	a-ha	Captain Jack	
20	Lemon Tree	Fools Garden	Garden Eden	
21	Children	Robert Miles	A.I.R.Miles	

=== Dancemania Covers 2 ===
Dancemania Covers 2 was released on March 18, 1998.

#	Track	Original artist	Cover crew	Ref
1	Another One Bites the Dust	Queen	Captain Jack	
2	Santa Maria	Tatjana Simić	DJ Milano feat. Samantha Fox	
3	I Should Be So Lucky	Stock Aitken Waterman	Jemma & Elise	
4	Waterloo	ABBA	E-Rotic	
5	One of Us	Joan Osborne	Wildside	
6	The Reason Is You (One On One)	Samantha Fox	Samantha Fox	
7	Hearts	Marty Balin	The Scarlet	
8	A Night To Remember	Shalamar	911	
9	Killing Me Softly (With His Song)	Charles Fox and Norman Gimbel	A.M.P. feat. Malorie	
10	No Tengo Dinero	Los Umbrellos	Los Umbrellos	
11	More More More	Diamond	Dolce & Gabbana	
12	I'm Not Scared	Eighth Wonder	R.F.L.M. feat. Milly Farrow	
13	Relight My Fire	Dan Hartman	Disco-Theca	
14	Breakout	Swing Out Sister	Seventh Sense feat. TJ	
15	The Look of Love	ABC	Eclipse	
16	Luka	Suzanne Vega	Alexa	
17	(I Just) Died in Your Arms	Nick Van Eede	DJ Carlos	
18	Hot Stuff	Donna Summer	Smashin	
19	Shout	Tears for Fears	Red Rhythm	

=== Dancemania Covers 01 ===
Dancemania Covers 01 was released on March 24, 2005.

#	Track	Original artist	Cover crew	Ref
1	Toxic (FT Company Edit)	Britney Spears	Helen	
2	Dilemma	Nelly & Kelly Rowland	CJ Crew feat. Rachel and Sami	
3	Turn Me On	Kevin Lyttle feat. Spragga Benz	CJ Crew feat. Wayte D'Arby and Sami	
4	Don't Tell Me (Factory Eurotrance Remix)	Avril Lavigne	Sheldon	
5	Vertigo (FT Company Edit)	U2	U-Boy feat. Axel Force	
6	Smoke On the Water	Deep Purple	CJ Crew feat. The Firelighters Showgroup	
7	Bring Me To Life (Radio Edit)	Evanescence	Rochelle	
8	Holiday (Definitive Mix)	Madonna	Who's That Girl!	
9	Venus (Definitive Mix)	Bananarama	Obsession	
10	The Tide Is High (Get The Feeling) (Lasgo Remix)	The Paragons	Atomic Kitten	
11	Never Ending Story (Manhattan Clique Extended Remix)	Limahl	Creamy	
12	Eternal Flame	The Bangles	Rochelle	
13	Right Here Waiting For You	Richard Marx	CJ Crew vs. DJ Kambell	
14	Heaven Is a Place on Earth (German Election Mix)	Belinda Carlisle	Julia	
15	Sky High (DJ Kaya Mix)	Jigsaw	DJ Miko	
16	We Are The Champions (Factory Team Remix)	Queen	Live 2 Love	
17	The Final Countdown	Europe	Toscana	
18	Mr. Roboto (Robotik Remix)	Styx	Pink Panther	
