= Peter Ravn =

Peter Ravn may refer to:

- Peter Ravn (artist) (born 1955), Danish painter
- Peter Ravn (speedway rider) (born 1962), Danish motorcycle speedway rider
