= Baby Boy (Me & My song) =

Single by Me & My

from the album Me & My
- Released: 1995
- Genre: Eurodance
- Length: 3:23
- Label: EMI
- Songwriters: Susanne Georgi; Pernille Georgi; Richie Balmorian; Jay Balmorian; Robin Rex; Peter Hartmann; Jan Langhoff
- Producers: Peter Hartmann; Jan Langhoff

Me & My singles chronology
| "Dub-I-Dub" (1995) | "Baby Boy" (1995) | "Lion Eddie" (1996) |

Music video
- "Baby Boy" on YouTube

"Baby Boy" is a song recorded by Danish Eurodance act and sisters Me & My, released in December 1995 by EMI Records as the second single from the act's eponymous album (1995). Co-written by the Georgi sisters, the song was produced by Peter Hartmann and Jan Langhoff, and enjoyed moderate success in many European countries, reaching number-one in both Denmark and Hungary. Additionally, it peaked at number three in Finland, number 10 in Belgium and number 30 in Austria. On the Eurochart Hot 100, the song reached number 60 in March 1996. Pan-European magazine Music & Media described it as "equally up-tempo and infectious" as "Dub-I-Dub". In 2007, "Baby Boy" was included on the act's best of album The Ultimate Collection.

== Music video ==
The accompanying music video for "Baby Boy" was directed by Danish artist Peter Ravn, featuring Me & My dressed like cats, rabbits and nuns. It was filmed in a military airfield in Denmark. In many scenes, the sisters performs while sitting on a blue cannon. It was painted especially for the video and turned back to military green the following day. Ravn had previously directed the video for "Dub-I-Dub", which was made in the same style as "Baby Boy". It was later made available by Warner Music Denmark on YouTube in 2009, having generated almost five million views as of early 2026.

== Track listing ==
- 12" single, Denmark
1. "Baby Boy" (Flex Club Mix) — 6:49
2. "Baby Boy" (Radio Version) — 3:23
3. "Baby Boy" (Dub Combo Version) — 5:06
4. "Baby Boy" (Rythmicity Version) — 9:28
- CD maxi, Europe
1. "Baby Boy" (Radio Version) — 3:23
2. "Baby Boy" (Flex Club Mix) — 5:50
3. "Baby Boy" (Dub COmbo Version) — 5:23
4. "Baby Boy" (Rythmicity Version) — 9:28
- CD maxi, Japan
1. "Baby Boy" (Radio Version) — 3:24
2. "Baby Boy" (Flex Club Mix) — 5:49
3. "Baby Boy" (Dub Combo Version) — 5:23
4. "Baby Boy" (Rythmicity Version) — 9:28
5. "Dub-I-Dub" (DJ Beam's Radio Remix) — 3:49
6. "Dub-I-Dub" (88-Keys Cub Mix) — 5:42

== Charts ==
| Chart (1995–1996) | Peak position |
|---|---|
| Austria (Ö3 Austria Top 40) | 30 |
| Belgium (Ultratop 50 Flanders) | 10 |
| Belgium (Ultratop 50 Wallonia) | 27 |
| Denmark (IFPI) | 1 |
| Europe (Eurochart Hot 100) | 60 |
| Finland (Suomen virallinen lista) | 3 |
| Hungary (Mahasz) | 1 |
| Netherlands (Dutch Top 40 Tipparade) | 7 |
| Netherlands (Single Top 100) | 37 |
| Sweden (Sverigetopplistan) | 46 |
| Switzerland (Schweizer Hitparade) | 39 |

== Certification ==
| Region | Certification | Certified units/sales |
|---|---|---|
| Denmark (IFPI Danmark) | Platinum | 8,000^{^} |
^{^} Shipments figures based on certification alone.
