= Dancemania 10 =

Compilation album by various artists
- Released: July 16, 1998
- Genres: Electronic, pop (Europop, Euro house)
- Length: 76:00
- Label: Toshiba EMI
- Producers: Masaaki Saito (executive producer); Hiro Kadoma (producer)

Dancemania chronology
9 (1998)	Dancemania 10 (1998)	X1 (1999)

Dancemania 10 is the tenth set in the Dancemania series of dance music compilation albums, released in 1998 by EMI Music Japan.

The album debuted at #13 on Oricon's weekly album chart, reached #9 the next week, and appeared on the yearly best-selling album chart at #84 in 1998 with 254,870 copies sold, along with another Dancemania album, Extra, which ranked #79.

This album featured Smile.dk's first appearance in the series with the song "Butterfly".

== Tracks ==
#	Track	By	Ref
1	In The Dark of The Night	E-Rotic	
2	Butterfly	Smile.dk	
3	Have You Never Been Mellow	The Olivia Project	
4	Stop (Morales Remix)	Spice Girls	
5	Do You Remember (Remix)	Móa	
6	Love Dot Com.	Jampack	
7	Rough Enough (Remix)	Popsie	
8	Boggie Nights	Disco Daze	
9	Give Me Love	DJ Dado	
10	Try Me Tonight	Yo Yo	
11	Feel the Night Way	Morgana	
12	Square Room	Masquerade	
13	I Believe in Miracles	Push!	
14	Round & Round	Chioé	
15	This Is the Night	Jacynthe	
16	Bee in My Bonnet	F.U.N.O.	
17	Loveline	Whoopee!	
18	I Can Hear a Sound	Jennifer	
19	Keep on Dancin' (Let's Go)	Perpetual Motion	
20	Taste of Luv	Marc Wilson	
21	My Love	Kinzica	
22	Take Me Away	Mr. John	
23	Moon	Kate	
24	Free	Roxanne Price	
25	Everything Counts	Subsonic Force	

== Further details ==
Intro : "In the Dark of the Night" (#1)
"In the Dark of the Night" was taken from E-Rotic's first greatest hits album, Greatest Tits, released in May 1998.

The album's full length is 76:00.

The longest track is "Have You Never Been Mellow" (#3) at 4:11.
The shortest track is "Moon" (#23) at 2:12.

The album's overall average tempo is 137 bpm;

The fastest track is "Everything Counts" (#25) at 166 bpm.
The slowest track is "Love Dot Com." (#6) at 125 bpm.

The album contains 2 cover songs.

#3 "Have You Never Been Mellow" is a cover of Olivia Newton-John's Have You Never Been Mellow.
#8 "Boggie Nights" is a cover of Heatwave's "Boogie Nights".

The non-stop mixing was done by two members of the DJ team MST; Kohtaroh Chuganji and Mitsugu Matsumoto.

Several tracks on the album, including different remixes, can also be found on other Dancemania albums such as Delux 3, Extra, EX 6, Diamond, Diamond Complete Edition, Best Red, Happy Paradise, Fura Mania, Zip Mania II, Zip Mania III, Zip Mania Best, Bass #6, Bass #9, Club The Earth II, Speed 2, Speed 4, Speed 6, Speed Best 2001 or Speed G.

#	Track	Length	BPM	Ref	Artist(s)	From / based in	Ref
1	In The Dark of The Night	2:59	132		E-Rotic	Germany	
2	Butterfly	3:19	135		Smile.dk	Sweden	
3	Have You Never Been Mellow	4:11	126		The Olivia Project	Australia	
4	Stop (Morales Remix)	3:10	126		Spice Girls	United Kingdom	
5	Do You Remember (Remix)	3:04	126		Móa	Iceland	
6	Love Dot Com.	2:57	125		Jampack	Denmark	
7	Rough Enough (Remix)	2:48	133		Popsie	Sweden	
8	Boggie Nights	3:50	133		Disco Daze	United Kingdom	
9	Give Me Love	3:28	138		DJ Dado	Italy	
10	Try Me Tonight	2:48	134		Yo Yo	Italy	
11	Feel the Night Way	2:43	135		Morgana	Italy	
12	Square Room	3:22	135		Masquerade	Italy	
13	I Believe in Miracles	2:43	135		Push!	Sweden	
14	Round & Round	3:15	138		Chioé	Sweden	
15	This Is the Night	2:48	138		Jacynthe	Canada	
16	Bee in My Bonnet	2:39	138		F.U.N.O.	Italy	
17	Loveline	2:26	138		Whoopee!	Denmark	
18	I Can Hear a Sound	3:33	138		Jennifer	(United Kingdom) UK / Italy	
19	Keep on Dancin' (Let's Go)	2:55	138		Perpetual Motion	United Kingdom	
20	Taste of Luv	3:02	142		Marc Wilson	(United Kingdom) UK / Germany	
21	My Love	2:55	142		Kinzica	Italy	
22	Take Me Away	2:53	144		Mr. John	Netherlands	
23	Moon	2:12	145		Kate	Italy	
24	Free	3:24	150		Roxanne Price	(United States) USA / Germany	
25	Everything Counts	3:06	166		Subsonic Force	Germany	
