= 5 (Die Antwoord EP) =

EP by Die Antwoord
- Released: 27 July 2010
- Recorded: 2010
- Genre: Alternative hip hop, rave
- Length: 21:50
- Label: Cherrytree Records
- Producer: DJ Hi-Tek; DJ Fishsticks (track 5)

Die Antwoord chronology
$O$ (2009)	5 (2010)	Ekstra (2010)

Singles from 5
- 1. "Enter the Ninja" Released: 9 August 2010; 2. "Fish Paste" Released: 2010

5 is an EP by South African hip hop group, Die Antwoord. The EP was the first official release by Die Antwoord on a major record label, Cherrytree Records (an imprint of Interscope Records). It followed up on internet circulation of the album $O$ and the viral "Enter the Ninja" music video, which featured on a number of high-traffic blog sites, most notably BoingBoing. The song incorporates elements of Smile.dk's song "Butterfly", famous for appearing in the Dance Dance Revolution series. The EP features some previously released material, as well as one new track and a remix. 'Fish Paste' was released as a promo single. Pitchfork Media made the entire EP available to stream on 12 June 2010.

== Reception ==
Rolling Stone magazine noted the use of both Afrikaans and English in Ninja's lyrics, whilst also mentioning the problem this presents for people not used to his strong South African accent, but ultimately concluded that "Die Antwoord don't dispense with rap clichés – they give them a new accent that's both disorienting and thrilling".

Consequence of Sound noted the fusion of hip hop with rave, and also mentioned the presence of lyrics in Afrikaans. The generally positive review concluded that 5 was "a fantastic prelude to a debut; the perfect thing to get you primed for their upcoming debut, $O$.", and that the EP was "a breath of fresh air and the perfect introduction to the South Africans, Die Antwoord".

A review by online music retailer Insound noted that whilst the rerelease of some tracks from the initial internet release of $O$ might mute the impact of the EP, it was perhaps better that some of the hype regarding the band had died down, allowing the music to be judged on its own merits. The review concluded that 'Enter the Ninja' was 'still as infectious, fascinating, witty and beautifully trashy as ever', noting 'Wat Kyk Jy?' and 'Fish Paste' as other standouts, and observing the fusion of musical styles in a similar manner to the Consequence of Sound review ('an odd blend of rave and 90's euro-pop').

"Enter The Ninja" debuted at #37 in the UK Music Charts on 19 September 2010.

== Artwork ==
The cover and back for 5 was shot by photographer Niel Bekker in Cape Town, South Africa.

== Track listing ==
#	Title	Time	Producer(s)
1	"Enter the Ninja"	5:05	DJ Hi-Tek
2	"Wat Kyk Jy?"	4:36	DJ Hi-Tek
3	"I Don't Need You"	3:57	DJ Hi-Tek
4	"Fish Paste"	4:17	DJ Hi-Tek
5	"Enter the Ninja (DJ Fishsticks Remix)"	3:21	DJ Fishsticks
