= Fly High (album) =

Studio album by Me & My
- Released: 2001
- Recorded: 1999 or 2000-2001
- Genre: Eurodance
- Label: EMI
- Producer: EMI

Me & My chronology
Let The Love Go On (1999)	Fly High (2001)

Fly High is the third album by Danish Eurodance duo Me & My, released in 2001.

== Track listing ==
1. Fly High (4:29)
2. La La Superstar (3:24)
3. Sleeping My Day Away (4:25)
4. Can't Forget The Past (Da Dap) (4:21)
5. Secret Garden (3:20)
6. No Way (3:18)
7. If I Was Your Lover (3:08)
8. The Sweetest Melody (3:30)
9. What Am I Gonna Do? (3:37)
10. Take My Heart (3:41)
11. Crazy (4:23)
12. Fly High Goodbye (1:43)

Japanese version

1. Fly High
2. Can't For Get The Past (Da Dap) (different mix)
3. Sleeping My Day Away
4. La La Superstar
5. Secret Garden
6. No Way
7. If I Was Your Love
8. Sweetest Melody
9. What Am I Gonna Do
10. Take My Heart
11. Crazy
12. Fly High Goodbye
13. Fly High (Club Mix)
14. Fly High (Dj Aligator Club Mix)
15. Fly High (Ringo Brothers Remix)
