= Newton (singer) =

UK firefighter turned pop singer

- Born: William Newton Myers; 3 June 1967 (age 59); Manchester, England, United Kingdom
- Genres: Eurodance, dance-pop, synthpop
- Occupations: Firefighter, singer-songwriter, dancer, producer
- Instruments: Vocals, guitar, keyboards
- Years active: 1986−present

William Newton Myers (born 3 June 1967), also known as Billy Myers and professionally as Newton, is a British singer and former firefighter. He is best known as a cover artist, with success in Australia, the United Kingdom and Brazil.

== Career ==
In 1994, Newton released their debut single, "Sky High", a cover of the 1975 hit by Jigsaw, which was produced by Mike Stock and Matt Aitken. "Sky High" peaked at number 8 in Australia in April 1995 and was certified gold. Originally a one-off project, this version features vocals by Jigsaw's Des Deyer, and features shots of Dyer in the video. Reception was good and Myers was brought in as vocalist to keep the project active and provide a stable persona.

In 1996, Newton released "Sometimes When We Touch", a cover of Dan Hill's hit, which peaked at number 5 in Australia and was also certified gold. It peaked at number 32 in the United Kingdom. Singles "Don't Worry", "We're All Alone" and "How Long" followed in 1997, all lifted from his debut studio album Sweetest Secret. In 1998, two further singles were released, "He Don't Love You (Like I Love You)" and "All Out of Love" with limited chart success.

In 2012, Newton returned with a second studio album titled Time to Believe.

== Discography ==
=== Studio albums ===
List of albums, with selected chart positions
Title	Details	Peak chart positions
Title	Details	AUS
Sweetest Secret	Released: August 1997; Format: CD, cassette; Label: Dominion Records; Released in Japan as We're All Alone	192
Time to Believe	Released: 2012; Format: CD, digital download; Label: Interscope Digital Distribution	—

=== Singles ===
List of singles as lead artist, with selected chart positions and certifications
Title	Year	Peak chart positions		Certifications	Album
Title	Year	AUS	UK	Certifications	Album
"Sky High"	1994	8	56		Sweetest Secret
"Sometimes When We Touch"	1996	5	32	ARIA: Gold	Sweetest Secret
"We're All Alone"	1997	64	—		Sweetest Secret
"Don't Worry"	1997	157	61		Sweetest Secret
"How Long"	1997	—	—		Sweetest Secret
"He Don't Love You (Like I Love You)"	1998	—	—		Sweetest Secret
"All Out of Love"	1998	—	—		Sweetest Secret
