= Me & My (album) =

Studio album by Me & My
- Released: 1995
- Genre: Eurodance
- Label: Medley
- Producer: Hartmann & Langhoff, Dean 'N, Johnny Jam, Per Holm

Me & My chronology
Me & My (1995)	Let the Love Go On (1999)

Me & My is the debut album by the Danish Eurodance duo Me & My, originally released in 1995.

== Track listing ==
All songs written by Susanne and Pernille Georgi, except where noted.

1. "Baby Boy" (Susanne Georgi, Pernille Georgi, Peter Hartmann, Jan Langhoff, Richie Balmorian, Jay Balmorian, Robin Rex)
2. "Lion Eddie"
3. "I Belong to You"
4. "Waiting"
5. "Magic Love"
6. "Dub-I-Dub"
7. "So Many Times" (Hartmann, Langhoff, R. Balmorian, J. Balmorian, Trine Quaade)
8. "Close"
9. "Show Your Love"
10. "Show Me"
11. "You & I"

== Toshiba EMI versions ==
Two other versions of the album were issued by Toshiba EMI. These were released exclusively in Japan in 1996 and 1998.

=== 1996 version ===
The 1996 version, released on February 10, 1996, reached #6 in the Oricon weekly album chart on March 18, 1996 and ranked #36 in the Oricon yearly Top 100 best-selling album chart in 1996 with 627,520 copies sold.

1. "Dub-I-Dub"
2. "Baby Boy"
3. "Lion Eddie"
4. "I Belong to You"
5. "Waiting"
6. "Magic Love"
7. "So Many Times"
8. "Close"
9. "Show Your Love"
10. "Show Me"
11. "You & I"

=== 1998 version ===
The 1998 version was released on March 28, 1998.

1. "Touch Of Your Love"
2. "Dub-I-Dub"
3. "Baby Boy"
4. "Lion Eddie"
5. "I Belong to You"
6. "Waiting"
7. "Magic Love"
8. "So Many Times"
9. "Close"
10. "Show Your Love"
11. "Show Me"
12. "You & I"

== Charts ==
Chart (1996)	Peak position
Hungarian Albums (MAHASZ)	12

== Certification ==
Region	Certification	Certified units/sales
Denmark (IFPI Danmark)	Gold	25,000^{^}
^{^} Shipments figures based on certification alone.
