= King Kong & D. Jungle Girls =

Italian band

- Origin: Italy
- Genres: Eurobeat, Hi-NRG
- Years active: 1987–1993
- Labels: Alfa, EMI Music Japan

King Kong & D. Jungle Girls was an Italian Eurobeat/Hi-NRG group formed in 1987. This Alias has been used by different Italian artists, which is very common among Eurobeat singers. To date, they have released two albums (in 1989 and 1991) as well as two compilation CDs and several singles. Several incarnations of their songs "Boom Boom Dollar" and "Walkie Talkie" have been featured in the Dance Dance Revolution video games and Dancemania compilation series and its sub-series including Speed. The English language lyrics to these songs, which bear a striking similarity to Engrish, are often misheard and largely incomprehensible to native speakers, a trait it shares with current Eurobeat music.

== Members ==
Male Vocal: Mauro Farina ( 1988 - 1991 ), Giancarlo Pasquini ( 1991 - 1993 ).

Female Vocal: Clara Moroni, Elena Ferretti.

== Discography ==
=== Albums ===
- Boom Boom Dollars (1989)
- King Kong (1991)
- Best of (1996)
- Boom Boom Dollar - King Kong Greatest Hits (2000)

=== Singles ===
- "Don't Let Me Be Misunderstood" (1987)
- "Lies" (1987)
- "It's So Funny" (1988)
- "Boom Boom Dollar" (1989)
- "Go, Go Boy" (1989)
- "Walkie Talkie" (1989)
- "Soft Time" (1989)
- "King Kong" (1990)
- "Little Flowers" (1990)
- "Love & American Dollars" (1990)
- "Turn The Sound Up Higher" (1990)
- "Bingo" (1991)
- "Bad Man" (1991)
- "Merry-Go-Round" (1992)
- "Panic in New York" (1993)

== Name inconsistencies ==
The "Jungle Girls" part of the group's name is often printed differently in English, most likely due to translation issues. While it seems to make sense (the actual printed name is "D. Jungle Girls"), it has also been printed as "The D.Jungle Girls" and most often, "D.J.Ungle Girls" or "D'Jungle Girls".
