= Let the Love Go On =

Studio album by Me & My
- Released: 1999
- Genre: Eurodance
- Producer: EMI

Me & My chronology
Me & My (1995)	Let the Love Go On (1999)	Fly High (2001)

Let the Love Go On is the second album by Danish Eurodance duo Me & My. It was released in 1999 and reached No. 11 in the Danish charts. The song "So Many Men" Is featured in the video game Dance Dance Revolution 3rdMix.

== Track listing ==
The following songs appeared on the album.

1. "I'm On My Way" - 4:05
2. "Loving You" - 3:30
3. "I'm Going Down" - 3:54
4. "You Left Me" (featuring Pipe) - 4:15
5. "Let the Love Go On" - 4:03
6. "Take Me Back" - 3:40
7. "That's the Way Life Is" - 4:11
8. "Every Single Day" - 3:10
9. "So Many Men" - 4:01
10. "You Do That Thing" - 3:47

Japanese version

1. "I'm On My Way" - 4:03
2. "So Many Men" - 3:59
3. "Loving You" - 3:51
4. "That's The Way Life Is" - 4:09
5. "Take Me Back" - 3:38
6. "You Left Me" (featuring Pipe) - 4:13
7. "Let The Love Go On" - 4:01
8. "I'm Going Down" - 3:53
9. "Every Single Day" - 3:10
10. "You Do That Thing" - 3:46
11. "Loving You" (US Radio Mix) for Japan only - 3:29
