= Classical Speed =

Compilation album series

Classical Speed is a sub-series of the Dancemania Speed compilation series, with uptempo dance remixes of famous classical music compositions.

Classical Speed

== History ==
The first issue, Classical Speed, was recorded by crews including some highly recognized dance music producers mainly from Germany and Italy, and was released on December 11, 2002, featuring tracks originally composed by famous classical music composers such as Beethoven, Mozart, and Tchaikovsky.

"Carmen's Prelude"
"Carmen's Prelude" by Violent String Ensemble, from Classical Speed

The second issue, Classical Speed 2, was released on August 18, 2004 with tracks including "Jupiter" as the intro, and 19 other tracks, including technically non-classical compositions such as "Jazz Suite Waltz", "Amazing Grace", and "Stars and Stripes Forever".

== Releases ==
=== Classical Speed ===
Classical Speed was released on December 11, 2002. The non-stop mixing was done by the team MST. The album's overall average tempo is 181 bpm.

#	Track	By	BPM	Ref
1	Guillaume Tell	MC F 40	180	
2	Radetzky March	Speedorchestra	184	
3	Serenade for Springs	KK feat. Manu	200	
4	Fur Elise [Speed Over Beethoven]	Rose	175	
5	Hungarian Dance No. 5	Hardcore Synth Orchestra	175	
6	Sabre Dance	Blue Venice	175	
7	Symphony No.5 in C Minor	CJ Crew	175	
8	Swan Lake Finale Act One	CJ Crew	175	
9	Ave Maria	CJ Crew feat. Lilla D	175	
10	Marche Militare	CJ Crew	175	
11	Victory March - from Aida	CJ Crew	175	
12	Jupiter - From the Plantes	S.N.A.H.	175	
13	Carmen's Prelude	Violent String Ensamble	177	
14	Csiko's Post	Ventura	180	
15	Orphee Aux Enfers [Kick the Can]	Bus Stop	183	
16	Piano Sonata K.331 "Rondo" alla Turca [Classic Cutz]	DJ Kambel vs MC Magika	186	
17	Air -from Suite No.3 in D major, BWV 1068	Mr. Vib-E-Rator	190	
18	Prelude -from Cello Suite No.1 in G major, BWV 1007	S & K	190	
19	Symphony No. 9	Mazerati	190	
20	Ode To Joy (Speed Version)	Hardcore Synth Orchestra & Jonny Mitraglia	190	

=== Classical Speed 2 ===
Classical Speed 2 was released on August 18, 2004. The non-stop mixing was done by the team KCP. The album's overall average tempo is 182 bpm.

#	Track	By	BPM	Ref
1	"The Planets", Op.32 Jupiter, The Bringer of Jolity	Speedorchestra	180	
2	Con Te Partiro (Time to Say Goodbye)	KK feat. Manu	182	
3	Amazing Grace	Speed All Stars	180	
4	Serenade No. 13 in G Major, K. 525, "Eine Kleine Nachatmusik" - 1st Movement	Violent String Ensamble	180	
5	"The Four Seasons" - "Spring", 1st Movement	Speed All Stars	179	
6	Symphony No.40 in G Minor, K.550 -1st Movent:Molto allegro	Nancy And The Boys	180	
7	"Judas Maccabaeus" - See, The Conquering Hero	The Orff Ki Ensemble	180	
8	Zigeunerweisen, Op.20	CJ Crew feat. Shazza	180	
9	Piano Sonata No.8 - 2nd Movement	Speed All Stars	180	
10	Chanson de l'adieu - Etude No.3 in E major, Op.10-3	Extra Terror Sound	180	
11	The Stars & Stripes Forever	Hardcore Synth Orchestra	182	
12	Piano Sonata No.14 in C sharp minor, Op.27-2 "Mondschein" - 1st. movement	Pyan Issim	182	
13	"Carmina Burana" - O Fortuna	The Orff Ki Ensemble	182	
14	Jazz Suite No.2 - No.4 Waltz	Pynck Hobo	182	
15	Gymnopedie No.1	Violent String Ensamble	182	
16	Prince Igor - Polovetsian Dance	DJ Speedo feat. Arenas Orchestra	182	
17	Die Walkure - The Ride of the Valkyries	MC F 40	182	
18	Bolero	DJ Speedo feat. Arenas Orchestra	182	
19	Piano Concerto No.1 in B Flat Minor, Op.23 - 1st Movement (Opening)	Speedmaster	186	
20	March "Pomp and Circumstance" No.1 in D Major, Op.39 - 1	Mazerati	197	
