= Future Girls =

Album by Smile.dk

Studio album by Smile.dk
- Released: July 26, 2000 (Japan); April 30, 2001 (International)
- Genre: Dance
- Label: Toshiba EMI

Smile.dk chronology
Smile (1998)	Future Girls (2000)	Smile Paradise (2001)

Singles from Future Girls
- 1. "Doo-Be-Di-Boy" Released: July 19, 2000

Future Girls is the second album by Swedish Eurodance group Smile.dk, released in 2000. The song "Dancing All Alone" was featured in the video game Dance Dance Revolution 5thMIX. Tracks from this album are featured on several Dancemania megamix albums, including Dancemania X7, X8 Hyper Delux, and Delux 5.

== Track listing ==
Future Girls standard edition
No.	Title	Writer(s)	Producer(s)	Length
1.	"Future Girls"	Robin Rex; Anders Nyman; Morgan Jalsing	Robin Rex; Anders Nyman; (Co-arrangement: Ola Wolf)	3:35
2.	"Doo-Be-Di-Boy"	Robert Uhlmann; Dean N	Robert Uhlmann	3:12
3.	"Hollywood"	M. Ankelius; H. Andersson	Hit Vision	3:20
4.	"Counting on You"	Robin Rex; Robert Uhlmann	Hit Vision	4:18
5.	"Dancing All Alone"	Robin Rex; Michael Rex; Tobias Karlsson	Robin Rex; Anders Nyman	3:09
6.	"Together"	Robin Rex; Anders Nyman	Robin Rex; Anders Nyman	3:15
7.	"Heal My Broken Heart"	M. Ankelius; H. Andersson	Hit Vision	3:43
8.	"Kissy Kissy"	Robert Uhlmann; Billy Lawrie	Robert Uhlmann	3:05
9.	"Love & Devotion"	Smile	Robin Rex; Anders Nyman; (Co-arrangement: Ola Wolf)	3:34
10.	"Don't Let Go"	Robert Uhlmann; Billy Lawrie	Dean N	3:30
11.	"Dragonfly"	Darwich; Garcia	Darwich; Garcia	3:18
12.	"Do You?"	Piet Souer; Robert Uhlmann	Darwich; Garcia	3:18
Total length:				41:37

Japanese edition bonus tracks
No.	Title	Writer(s)	Producer(s)	Length
13.	"Someday"	Michael Rex	Robin Rex; Anders Nyman	3:06
14.	"Dancing All Alone (Kimono Remix)"			3:10
Total length:				47:53

== Personnel ==
Credits were adapted from the booklet.

=== Musicians ===
- Veronica Almqvist – lead vocal
- Malin Kernby – lead vocal
- J. Jelse (Jesper Jelse) – backing vocals (track 7 and 4)
- P. Lundström – guitars (track 4)

=== Composers and technicians ===
- Björn Engelmann – mastering engineer
- Ola Wolf – co-arrangement (1 and 9)
- Robin Rex – writer, producer, mixer, arranger (multiple tracks)
- Anders Nyman – writer, producer, mixer, arranger (multiple tracks)
- Morgan Jalsing – writer (1)
- Robert Uhlmann – writer, producer, mixer, arranger, vocal recording (multiple tracks)
- Dean N (Dean 'N) – writer, producer, mixer, arranger (2, 10)
- M. Ankelius (Martin Ankelius) & H. Andersson (Helena Andersson) – writers (3, 7)
- Billy Lawrie – writer (8, 10)
- Darwich & Garcia – writers, producers, mixers, arrangers (11, 12)
- Piet Souer – writer (12)
- Michael Rex – writer (13; also co-writer on 5)
- Tobias Karlsson – writer (5)
- Hit Vision – produced, arranged & mixed (3, 7, 4)

=== Others ===
- Christian Backman - A&R
- Ravn Design – art-direction
- Robin Skjoldborg – photo
- Charlotte Mielke – styling
