= DJ Miko =

Italian dance act (born 1973)

- Origin: Italy
- Genres: Italodance, Eurodance
- Years active: 1993–2001
- Labels: Dig It International (Hotline Records); SAIFAM (One Way Records, Urban Zoo)
- Past members: Monier Quartararo (keyboards); Louise Gard (performer); Massimo Artusi ("Max Art", prod.); Riccardo "Ricky" Stecca (prod.); Mauro Farina (prod.); Maria Caprì (studio vocals); Annerley Gordon (studio vocals); Jackie Bodimead (studio vocals); Melody Castellari (studio vocals)

DJ Miko was an Italian dance act fronted by keyboardist Monier Quartararo Gagliardo (born 8 February 1973) and British performer Louise Anne Gard from Tunbridge Wells. They mainly released dance cover versions of past pop and rock hits and are primarily known for their 1993 hit cover of 4 Non Blondes' "What's Up". During the group's active years, DJ Miko released one album and twelve singles.

The project was managed by the Milan-based record company Dig It International, for which Gagliardo already worked as an in-house producer, and released on its Hotline Records label. As with all other releases on Hotline Records, SAIFAM in Verona was responsible for the music production. Following the closure of Dig It International in 1997, the project was fully absorbed by SAIFAM.

DJ Miko has made many appearances on the Eurodance compilation album Dancemania series, specifically its sub-series albums including Dancemania Speed and Dancemania Covers since 1999, and on Konami's Bemani series of rhythm music video games with three covers.

Over their career, the DJ Miko project has employed various studio vocalists. Their debut single "What's Up" was recorded by singer Maria Caprì from Milan. The follow-up, "Rhythm", featured lead vocals by Annerley Gordon and background vocals by Cristina Dori. The singles "Clementine" (1997) through "Shout" (2000) were all sung by Jackie Bodiemead, a studio vocalist at SAIFAM. "Forever Young" (2001), the final single released on vinyl, was sung by Italian studio singer and vocal coach Melody Castellari. In recent years, SAIFAM has occasionally used the names of its successful projects from the past, including DJ Miko, as aliases for dance cover versions on its many compilation album series.

== Discography ==
=== Albums ===
- The Last Millennium (1999, Italy)

=== Singles ===
Single	Year	Peak chart positions													Album
Single	Year	ITA	AUS	EUR	FIN	IRE	NZ	SCO	SPA	SWE	UK	US	US Dan.	US Rhy.	Album
"What's Up"	1993	5	92	21	13	8	23	2	5	17	6	58	19	23	The Last Millennium (1999)
"Hot Stuff" / "Lovely Lullaby"	1994	—	—	—	—	—	—	—	—	—	—	—	—	—	The Last Millennium (1999)
"Rhythm"	1994	—	—	—	—	—	—	—	—	—	—	—	—	—	The Last Millennium (1999)
"Clementine"	1997	—	—	—	—	—	—	—	—	—	—	—	—	—	The Last Millennium (1999)
"Superboy"	1998	—	—	—	—	—	—	—	—	—	—	—	—	—	The Last Millennium (1999)
"My Sharona" / "Keep On"	1998	—	—	—	—	—	—	—	—	—	—	—	—	—	The Last Millennium (1999)
"Dreaming"	1998	—	—	—	—	—	—	—	—	—	—	—	—	—	The Last Millennium (1999)
"What's Up 2000"	1998	—	—	—	—	—	—	—	—	—	—	—	—	—	The Last Millennium (1999)
"Ruby Tuesday"	1999	—	—	—	—	—	—	—	—	—	—	—	—	—	The Last Millennium (1999)
"Sky High"	1999	—	—	—	—	—	—	—	—	—	—	—	—	—	The Last Millennium (1999)
"Shout"	2000	—	—	—	—	—	—	—	—	—	—	—	—	—	Singles only
"Forever Young"	2001	—	—	—	—	—	—	—	—	—	—	—	—	—	Singles only

=== Video game appearances ===
DJ Miko has a total of 2 cover songs which appear in the Dance Dance Revolution arcade series:

- "Sky High", originally by Jigsaw (cover also available in StepManiaX)
- "What a Wonderful World", originally by Louis Armstrong (cover credited to Beatbox vs. DJ Miko)

Additional appearances include the following:

- Dance Dance Revolution A20 golden cabinets received "Sky High (20th Anniversary Mix)" by Haruki Yamada (ATTIC INC.) with Martin Leroux on June 27, 2019. It is a cover of "Sky High" that is inspired by the DJ Miko version.
- Dance Maniax, known as Dance Freaks in South Korea, features "My Sharona" by DJ Miko. This song was originally by The Knack, and this cover is only available on the first release of the game.

Song	Arcade game						StepManiaX availability
Song	2000	Ex	SN	SN2	X	SMX	StepManiaX availability
"Sky High"	Yes	Yes				Yes	April 30, 2021
"What a Wonderful World"			Yes	Yes	Yes		—N/a
