= Smile (Smile.dk album) =

Studio album by Smile.dk
- Released: July 13, 1998
- Recorded: 1998
- Label: Medley Records
- Producers: Robert Uhlmann; Robin Rex

Smile.dk chronology
Smile (1998)	Future Girls (2000)

Singles from Smile
- 1. "Coconut" Released: 1998; 2. "Butterfly" Released: 1998; 3. "Boys" Released: 1999; 4. "Mr. Wonderful" Released: 1999

Smile is the debut studio album by Swedish pop band Smile.dk. The album sold gold in Japan, and Smile.dk received "Best International Girl Group" in Hong Kong in 1998.

== Track listing ==
All songs written and produced by Robert Uhlmann and Robin Rex.

1. "Butterfly" – 2:58
2. "Coconut" – 3:23
3. "Sweet Senorita" – 3:10
4. "Middle of the Night" – 3:24
5. "Tic Toc" – 3:00
6. "Get Out" – 3:12
7. "Boys" – 3:06
8. "Mr. Wonderful" – 3:14
9. "Knock Knock" – 3:16
10. "Comme Ci Comme Ca" – 3:03
11. "Happy In Love" (Japan/Malaysia bonus track) – 3:26

The track "Coconut" reached No. 10 in New Zealand, where it was frequently used in children's exercise programs in schools.

== Chart performance ==
Chart (1998)	Peak position
Japanese Albums (RIAJ)	48

== Certifications ==
Region	Certification	Certified units/sales
Japan (RIAJ)	Gold	100,000^{^}
