= CJ Crew =

Dance music DJ duo

CJ Crew are a dance music DJ duo, consisting of Chris Bucknall and John Briley. Other aliases include Big Vin & Hugh Jardon, Chi K Monkey, Chi K Munki, Connie and the Plainsman, Demanche Noir, Muff and the Munchers, Nancy and the Boys, The Orff Ki Ensemble, Pyan Issim, Pynck Hobo, Terry and the Physicist, Umi Ghoulies, and Wine.

CJ Crew have made a number of appearances on Toshiba EMI's Dancemania compilation albums, mainly those of the Speed sub-series, and on several soundtrack albums for the Dance Dance Revolution series and Martial Beat series. Their first appearance on the Dancemania series was on the 2000 compilation of Dancemania Speed 4 with two remix tracks, one being "Change The World" and the other being "Livin' La Vida Loca".

Chris Bucknall also appeared as a keyboardist on Pete Haycock's 1987 album Guitar and Son, and DJ Angel's two albums, Love Thing and Tell Me On Sunday, both issued in Germany in the mid-2000s. John Briley produced a compilation album, entitled Brainwaves, issued in the United Kingdom in 1978. John Briley started his musical career as a vocalist with various bands. His band 'Limelight' were signed to the Deram label with John having a solo deal with Decca Records. John presented the rock show Extravaganza on the BBC before commencing a path into the recording industry with labels that encompassed Transatlantic, Ariola, Arista, Polydor, then becoming MD of Zomba/Jive managing the career of Mutt Lange, working on the Def Leppard 'Hysteria' project, before becoming a board member and Senior Vice President at EMI / Capitol Records in London and Los Angeles. Acts that John was instrumental in the success of include Annie Lennox and Dave Stewart, Sky, Kiki Dee, Joan Jett, Krokus, Billy Ocean, Haircut 100, Radiohead, Blur, Iron Maiden, Queen, Duran Duran and many others. John's first success as a producer was the multi-million selling album by the Brighouse and Rastrick Band's 'The Floral Dance'.

== Appearances ==
=== Dancemania ===
- Speed : 4 (2000), 6 (2001), 7 (2001), 8 (2002), 9 (2002), 10 (2002)

Best 2001 Hyper Nonstop Megamix (2000)
Speed G : 1 (2003), 2 (2003), 3 (2004), 4 (2005), 5 (2005)
Classical Speed : 1 (2002), 2 (2004)
Christmas Speed (2003)
Speed SFX (2003)
Speed Deka (2004)
Speed TV (2004)
Speedrive (2006)
Speed Buyuden (2006)

- Covers : 01 (2005)

=== DDR soundtracks ===
- Dance Dance Revolution 4th Mix Original Soundtrack
- Dance Dance Revolution 5th Mix Original Soundtrack
- Dance Dance Revolution Party Collection Original Soundtrack
