= Evil Boy =

Single by Die Antwoord featuring Wanga

from the album $O$
- Released: 8 October 2010
- Genre: Hip hop, rave
- Length: 4:32; 4:56 (F**k You In The Face Mix)
- Label: Interscope
- Songwriters: Tony Cottrell, Watkin Tudor Jones, Justin De Nobrega, Hugo Passaquin, Thomas Wesley Pentz (Diplo), Yolandi Visser
- Producer: Diplo

"Evil Boy" is a song by South African hip hop group Die Antwoord featuring rapper Wanga. It was written by Tony Cottrell, Watkin Tudor Jones (Ninja), Justin De Nobrega, Hugo Passaquin, Thomas Wesley Pentz (Diplo), and Yolandi Visser, and was produced by Diplo. It was released by Interscope Records and it serves as the final single from their album $O$.

An extended version of the song titled "Evil Boy (F**k You In The Face Mix)" was digitally released as a single on 8 October 2010 in certain countries.

== Background ==
Diplo, who took an interest to Yo-Landi Vi$$er, contacted the group before sending them a beat which Ninja enjoyed, eventually collaborating on "Evil Boy".

== Lyrical content ==
"Evil Boy"
A 30-second sample of "Evil Boy" featuring Wanga's chorus and Yolandi's rap verse.

The lyrics of the song discuss tribal circumcision. In an interview, Ninja described a particular ritual for males over 19 that involved having "your penis chopped up with a kitchen knife. No disinfectants; no pain killers."

We've known Wanga since he was a street kid. He lives in this house in Cape Town and squats on a farm. This year, Wanga was supposed to go to one of these rituals because he wasn't circumcised. We thought maybe he just shouldn't go because 60 kids fucking died this year because their penises didn't work properly afterward and shit. So I asked him what would happen if he didn't go to the bush, and he said that he wouldn't be a man and he wouldn't be able to speak to the other men. So I asked him why he was speaking to me and he said, "Because you're cool, Ninja." Then he looked at my tattoo and said he wanted to be "Evil Boy for life."

— Ninja

== Critical reception ==
Complex complimented Diplo's "creeping synth hook that captures the group's silliness without turning them into a joke" and included the song on a list of Diplo's best productions.

A.R. Rowe of MTV wrote "No 'We Are the World' tracks for Die Antwoord. No Bono charities. These guys are taking some of the most unaddressed, difficult issues in the world, and sticking them right in your face without apology."

== Music video ==
The music video was directed by Ninja and Rob Malpage. It contains major influence from South African culture, sexuality, as well as mythology, such as the Tokoloshe. It features a cameo by producer Diplo.

=== Reception ===
Craig Hlavaty of the Houston Press said the video makes "Lady Gaga seem like Celine Dion" and warned "If you don't like random erections, wooden erections, talking breasts, breasts with no nipples, words that aren't English, mud, grime, gold lame pants, clean and strong peni, machetes, more erections, jackets made of rats, monsters with erections, questionable facial hair, and prostitution, don't watch this video."

As of March 2019, the video has over thirty million views on YouTube.

== Track listing ==
Digital download

1. "Evil Boy (F**k You In the Face Mix)" – 4:56
