= Susanne Georgi =

Danish singer (born 1976)

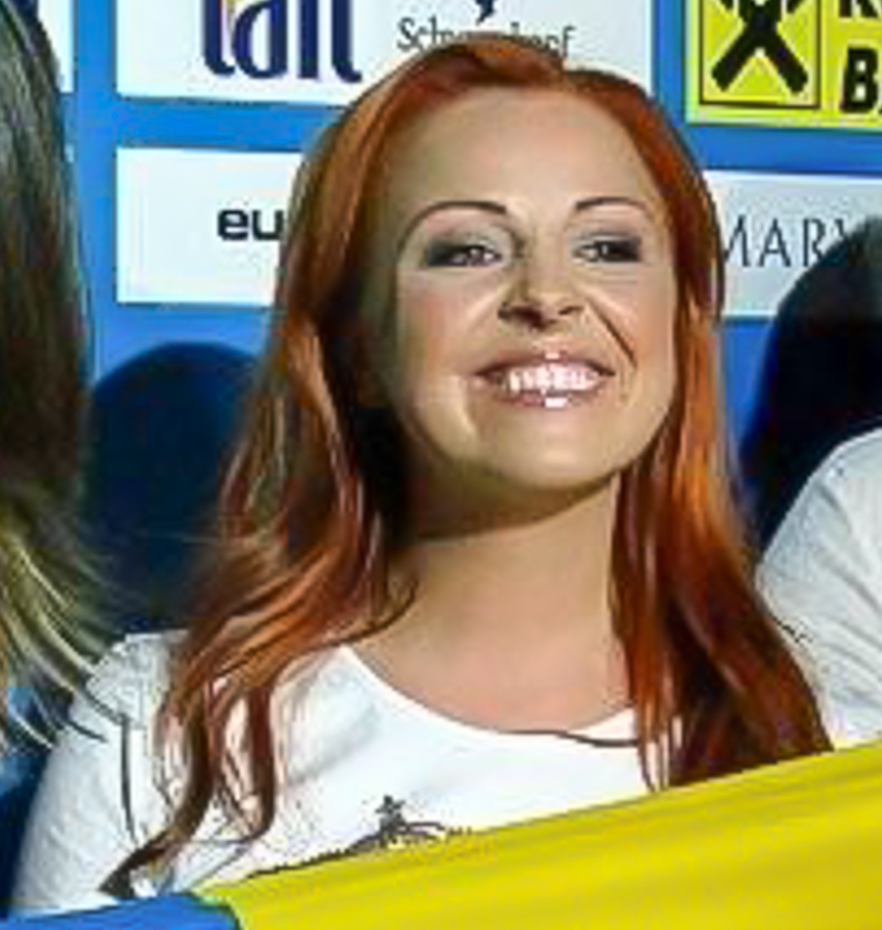

Background information
- Born: Susanne Georgi Nielsen; 27 July 1976 (age 49); Kolding Municipality, Denmark
- Genres: Pop, dance
- Occupations: Singer, television host
- Years active: 1988–present

Susanne Georgi Nielsen (born 27 July 1976), commonly known as Susanne Georgi, is a Danish singer who lives and works in Andorra. She represented the country in the Eurovision Song Contest 2009.

== Career ==
Georgi started her career along with her sister in the duo Me & My; the group had a couple of hits around Europe. They also participated in the Danish pre-selection for Eurovision Song Contest 2007 together, in the end landing a 6th place in the national final. In 2009, she stated on her official MySpace page that she was recording her fourth album.

Georgi is the owner of Stars Academy - the biggest singing academy in Andorra. She also runs a management and recording studio to help new and upcoming talents.

Susanne has prepared many artists from all over Europe for participation in several TV-shows and contests including Britain's Got Talent, Got Talent España, La Voz (Spanish TV series), La Voz Kids, Veo cómo cantas (Spanish game show), Eurovision Denmark, Eurovision Luxembourg and Eurovision Andorra.

== Eurovision 2009 ==
Susanne represented Andorra in the Eurovision Song Contest 2009 in Moscow, Russia with the song "La teva decisió (Get a Life)". The results of the national final in Andorra showed that she had received 47% of the jury vote and 66% of the public televote. The song, however, failed to make it to the final of Eurovision the same year, losing out in the first semi-final. It was not the first time Susanne has made an appearance in Eurovision; at the Eurovision Song Contest 2007 she presented the Danish televoting results at the Final in Helsinki. She has been working extensively to bring Andorra back to the contest since her appearance in the competition.

Susanne Georgi is a well-known personality in the Eurovision world. She has been the leader in the fight for getting Andorra back in Eurovision again.

== Personal life ==
Georgi moved to Andorra in 1995 and has lived there ever since. She can speak Catalan, Danish, English, Spanish and German.

On 10 September 2011, Georgi married Xavier Puigcercós. They have two daughters: Molly Puigcercós Georgi (2010) and Shelly Puigcercós Georgi (2012). In 2019, Molly was a contestant on the Spanish version of The Voice Kids broadcast on Antena 3. Molly and Shelly was in 2023 contestants in the Spanish version of The Voice Kids broadcast on Antena 3. Susanne Georgi filed for divorce from Puigcercos in September 2024. She told the Danish press that this marks the second time the couple has separated.

Awards and achievements
Preceded by Gisela with "Casanova"	Andorra in the Eurovision Song Contest; 2009	Succeeded by None
