= Jenny Rom =

Italian dance singer

Jenny Rom is an Italian dance project known for her high-pitched, fast-paced dance music. She is produced under SAIFAM Publishing Group Italy. Her songs have been featured in Japan's Dancemania music compilation series, especially its Speed sub-series, as well as Dance Dance Revolution. Rom was first started by one of SAIFAM's DJ groups, DJ JAXX, starting with the song "Do You Want A Flirt?". The second song was "WWW.BLONDE GIRL". Rom and The Zippers are extremely close alias groups with the same sound used by SAIFAM. Recently, The Zippers have turned to doing covers instead of the Jenny Rom style.

A longstanding rumor originating in the DDRMAX era stated that Rom's first name in full is "Giovanna". However, in June 2023 the longstanding rumor has been disproved, with Melody Castellari stating on Instagram private messaging that she was the singer for "WWW.Blonde Girl". The male voice was sung by Mauro Farina. Jenny Rom is a studio project, and her songs were sung by in-house studio artists at the time the tracks were made. Castellari was not told that this song she sang would be titled as Jenny Rom.
