= MC Magika =

British record producer

- Born: Aimran Majid; 1974 or 1975 (age 50–51)
- Origin: Birmingham
- Genres: house, hardcore, techno, jungle, drum and bass
- Occupations: MC, music producer, promoter
- Website: grooveconnection.co.uk/mcmagika.html

Aimran Majid (born 1974 or 1975), more commonly known as MC Magika, is a British MC, music producer and rave promoter. He was regularly featured at many of the big UK raves in the mid to late 1990s including Dreamscape, Helter Skelter, Fantazia, and on the dance music compilation Dancemania Speed sub-series. He is also known for being the MC for DJ Carl Cox, over several years from the early 1990s. Magika has presented on MTV Dance, hosted radio shows, and in 2022 started a martial arts academy in Stirchley, Birmingham.

== Discography ==
=== Singles ===
- "Flashdance (What a Feeling)" (1996)
- "Hardhouse Raver" (2002) - with Mutant DJ

=== Albums ===
- The Old Skool Masters Round 2: Ratpack V Magika Presenting Blackmagic (1998) - with Ratpack
- Candy Raveparty Vol. 1 (2001) - with DJ Horn
- Candy Raveparty Vol. 2 (2002) - with KengKeng

=== Appearances ===
==== Dreamscape ====
- 6 (1993)
- 7 (1993)
- 8 (1994)
- 10 (1994)
- 11 (1994)
- 12 (1994)
- 14 (1994)
- 22 (1996)
- 24 (1997)

==== Dancemania ====
- Speed : 3 (1999), 6 (2001), 7 (2001), 8 (2002), 9 (2002), 10 (2002)

Classical Speed : 1 (2002)
Speed G : 1 (2003)
Best of Hardcore (2003)

==== Others ====
- Happy Daze (1996)
- Dance Dance Revolution 3rdMIX Original Soundtrack (2000)
- Hardcore Underground (2006)
- X Years of Hellhouse (2009)
- In Full Effect - The Mix Tapes (1995)
- The Payback (1996)
- Capital Punishment (1997)
- Helter Skelter Imagination NYE 1996/1997 (1997)
- Black Magik (1998)
- Helter Skelter 10 Legendary Years Hardcore (2001)
- Banginglobe Anthem (2002)
- Dance Valley 2002 - Hard Dance Edition (2002)
- The Sound of Don Diablo (2002)
- Torture Garden vs. Fallen Angel (2002)
- Hard Kandy - International Series Vol 1 (2004)
- The Legend of Hellhouse #02 (2004)
- X Bass (2004)
- Black Magic - Hard Trance Anthems (2005)
- Blutonium Presents Hardstyle Vol. 5 (2005)
- Hardbass Generation (2005)
- Hardcore Underground (2006)
- Pharmacy Volume 3: Down with the Sickness (2006)
- X Years of Hellhouse (2009)
