= SOS (Die Antwoord album) =

Studio album by Die Antwoord
- Released: 12 October 2010
- Recorded: 2008–2009
- Genre: Alternative hip hop, rave, electronica
- Length: 68:03 (original release)
- Label: Indie/Cherrytree (re-release)
- Producer: DJ Hi-Tek; Diplo ("Evil Boy" on re-release)

Die Antwoord chronology
SOS (2010)	5 (2010)

Die Antwoord studio album chronology
SOS (2010)	Ten$ion (2012)

Singles from SOS
- 1. "Wat Pomp?" Released: 6 June 2009; 2. "Beat Boy" Released: 2009/10; 3. "Enter the Ninja" Released: 9 August 2010; 4. "Fish Paste" Released: 2010; 5. "Evil Boy" Released: 28 September 2010

Professional ratings
Aggregate scores
Source	Rating
Metacritic	(69/100)
Review scores
Source	Rating
AllMusic	4/5 stars
One Thirty BPM	(87%)
Pitchfork Media	(5.5/10)
Robert Christgau	A−
Rolling Stone	3/5 stars
Spin	(7/10)
The A.V. Club	B
NME	(5/10)

SOS (stylized as $O$) is the debut studio album by South African rap-rave group Die Antwoord. The album was initially a widely circulated internet-only release, and made available to stream for free on the band's website prior to Interscope Records signing the band. The song "Wat Pomp?" had a music video released on 6 June 2009, followed by "Enter the Ninja" (a track with previous exposure as a viral video on YouTube and other video-hosting services), which received an official release on 9 August 2010. "Fish Paste" and "Beat Boy" have also been released as promotional singles. "Enter the Ninja" debuted at #37 in the UK Music Charts on 19 September 2010.

Following the group's signing to Interscope in the US, it was announced that SOS would be re-released in physical format with a different track listing. Diplo produced one of the new tracks on the re-release, "Evil Boy", for which a promotional video was made available on 6 October 2010. The US iTunes digital release includes the previously hidden track "SOS" separately, a bonus track "Wat Pomp?" and an alternate version of "Evil Boy" titled as "Evil Boy (F**k You In The Face Mix)" not present on US physical release.

In an interview Ninja mentioned that he considered the album to be the first in a five-album plan.

== Track listings ==
Digital release
No.	Title	Length
1.	"Whatever Man"	0:33
2.	"Wat Kyk Jy?"	4:36
3.	"Enter the Ninja"	5:08
4.	"Wat Pomp" (featuring Jack Parow)	4:08
5.	"Wie Maak Die Jol Vol" (featuring Knoffel Bruin, Isaac Mutant, Jaak Paarl and Scallywag)	5:08
6.	"Rich Bitch"	3:32
7.	"I Don't Need You"	3:57
8.	"Very Fancy"	2:52
9.	"Dagga Puff"	4:40
10.	"My Best Friend" (featuring The Flying Dutchman aka Ne0SA)	1:19
11.	"Liewe Maatjies"	3:42
12.	"$copie"	3:12
13.	"Beat Boy"	8:20
14.	"Super Evil"	4:01
15.	"Doos Dronk" (featuring Jack Parow and Fokofpolisiekar)	3:51
16.	"SOS"	4:00
17.	"Jou Ma Se Poes In 'n FishPaste Jar"	4:16
18.	"Orinoco Ninja Flow" (Wedding DJ's Remix)	3:27
Total length:		68:03

American physical release
No.	Title	Length
1.	"In Your Face"	4:29
2.	"Enter the Ninja"	5:04
3.	"Wat Kyk Jy?"	4:35
4.	"Evil Boy"	4:33
5.	"Rich Bitch"	3:03
6.	"Fish Paste"	4:02
7.	"$copie"	3:08
8.	"Beat Boy"	8:18
9.	"She Makes Me a Killer"	7:29
10.	"Doos Dronk" (Contains the hidden track "SOS" starting at 8:52)	12:52

iTunes release
No.	Title	Length
11.	"SOS"	4:00
12.	"Wat Pomp? (Bonus Track)" ((Bonus Track))	4:08
13.	"Dagga Puff (Bonus Track)" ((Bonus Track))	3:54

South African release
No.	Title	Length
1.	"In Your Face"	4:29
2.	"Whatever Man" (skit)	0:32
3.	"Enter the Ninja"	5:05
4.	"Wat Kyk Jy?"	4:36
5.	"Evil Boy"	4:29
6.	"Wat Pomp?"	4:07
7.	"Rich Bitch"	3:31
8.	"Liewe Maatjies"	3:38
9.	"Wie Maak Die Jol Vol?"	5:07
10.	"My Best Friend" (skit)	1:02
11.	"Fish Paste"	4:16
12.	"$copie"	3:09
13.	"Beat Boy"	8:02
14.	"Pretty Woman" (skit)	0:48
15.	"She Makes Me a Killer"	7:29
16.	"Doos Dronk" (Contains the hidden track "SOS")	11:21

Spotify release
No.	Title	Length
1.	"In Your Face"	4:29
2.	"Enter the Ninja"	5:04
3.	"Wat Kyk Jy?"	4:35
4.	"Evil Boy" (F**k You In The Face Mix)	4:33
5.	"Rich Bitch"	3:03
6.	"Fish Paste"	4:02
7.	"$copie"	3:08
8.	"Beat Boy"	8:18
9.	"She Makes Me a Killer"	7:29
10.	"Doos Dronk"	3:51
11.	"SOS"	4:00
Total length:		53:55

== Charts ==
Chart (2010)	Peak position
US Billboard 200	109
US Top Dance Albums (Billboard)	4
US Heatseekers Albums (Billboard)	1
US Indie Store Album Sales (Billboard)	21
US Top Rap Albums (Billboard)	14
