= Me & My =

Danish musical duo

- Origin: Kolding, Denmark
- Genres: Eurodance, dance-pop, bubblegum
- Years active: 1995–present
- Label: EMI
- Members: Susanne Georgi; Pernille Georgi
- Website: Official website (archived)

Me & My is a Danish Eurodance duo, formed by sisters Susanne Georgi (born 27 July 1976) and Pernille Georgi (born 24 July 1974) in 1995 in Kolding. The debut album Me & My has sold more than 2 million copies, and the debut single Dub-I-Dub more than 1 million copies in total. Me & My was best-selling artist of the year in Japan back then. They are best known for their first international hit song "Dub-I-Dub" (1995), which has been featured on many compilations including the Dancemania series albums.

== Biography ==
Me & My originally formed in 1988 under the name "SuPer Sisters" (the word "SuPer" being a compound of the two singers' first names). They first appeared on Danish television in 1989, and released two Danish-language albums in 1989 to 1990. They also tried to enter the Eurovision Song Contest 1991; however Susanne, 15 years old at the time, was too young to enter. The song which they were supposed to sing eventually finished second in the Danish national final.

In 1995, they released their self-titled debut album which went on to sell two million copies worldwide. Besides attaining a reasonable level of popularity in Europe, the duo have also gained fans around the world due to their songs "Dub-I-Dub" and "So Many Men" having been licensed by Toshiba-EMI Ltd. (the Japanese division of EMI) for Dance Dance Revolution, a popular arcade videogame series. The tracks debuted in the games in 1999 and 2000, respectively, and are still firm favourites with players of the game. "Dub-I-Dub" was included as one of several classic tracks on the tenth-anniversary Dance Dance Revolution game, DDR X, released in May 2008.

The two sisters still write songs for other artists, and recently revealed on "Musikprogrammet" (a Danish music program on television) that they were saving some of the best songs for a "sometime in the future album".

In 2007, Me & My finally got to take part in the Dansk Melodi Grand Prix (national selection for Eurovision Song Contest) with the song "Two Are Stronger Than One". On 2 February they qualified from the semi-final to the final, which was held on February 10. Even though they were the bookmakers' favourites to win, Me & My only managed to get 8 points, finishing 6th.

On 1 December 2007, Me & My released their first single in 6 years since "La La Superstar" in 2001 - a Christmas ballad titled "Too Much Christmas".

In early 2013, Pernille Georgi mentioned on her official fanpage that Me & My may be active again in 2014 and have mentioned plans in Japan, possibly for a tour. They are performing their first new concert as Me & My on 4 September 2013.

On 11 November 2016, Me & My released a remix single of "Two Are Stronger Than One". The remix was done by Stormby (Matt Eriksson), who was asked by their biggest Danish fan for help to get it remixed. The single also contains a radio edit and a club remix.

== Discography ==
=== Albums ===
- Me & My (1995)
- Let the Love Go On (1999)
- Fly High (2001)
- The Ultimate Collection (2007)

=== Singles ===
Year	Single	Peak chart positions											Certifications (sales thresholds)	Album
Year	Single	AUT	BEL (Vl)	BEL (Wa)	DEN	FIN	FRA	GER	NED	NOR	SUI	SWE	Certifications (sales thresholds)	Album
1995	"Dub-I-Dub"	11	5	9	1	16	43	37	25	12	14	2		Me & My
1995	"Baby Boy"	30	10	27	2	3	—	—	37	—	39	46		Me & My
1996	"Lion Eddie"	—	21	—	12	—	—	—	—	—	—	—		Me & My
1996	"Waiting"	—	—	—	—	—	—	—	—	—	—	—		Me & My
1999	"Let the Love Go On"	—	—	—	3	—	—	—	—	—	—	—		Let the Love Go On
1999	"Loving You"	—	—	—	—	—	—	—	—	—	—	—		Let the Love Go On
1999	"Every Single Day"	—	—	—	—	—	—	—	—	—	—	—		Let the Love Go On
2000	"So Many Men"	—	—	—	—	—	—	—	—	—	—	—		Let the Love Go On
2000	"Fly High"	—	—	—	8	—	—	—	—	—	—	—		Fly High
2001	"Sleeping My Day Away"	—	—	—	20	—	—	—	—	—	—	—		Fly High
2001	"La La Superstar"	—	—	—	15	—	—	—	—	—	—	—		Fly High
2007	"Too Much Christmas"	—	—	—	—	—	—	—	—	—	—	—		
2007	"—" denotes releases that did not chart													

=== Collaborations ===
- "Te Quiero" (with Nicole) (2002)
