= Smile.dk =

Swedish Eurodance group

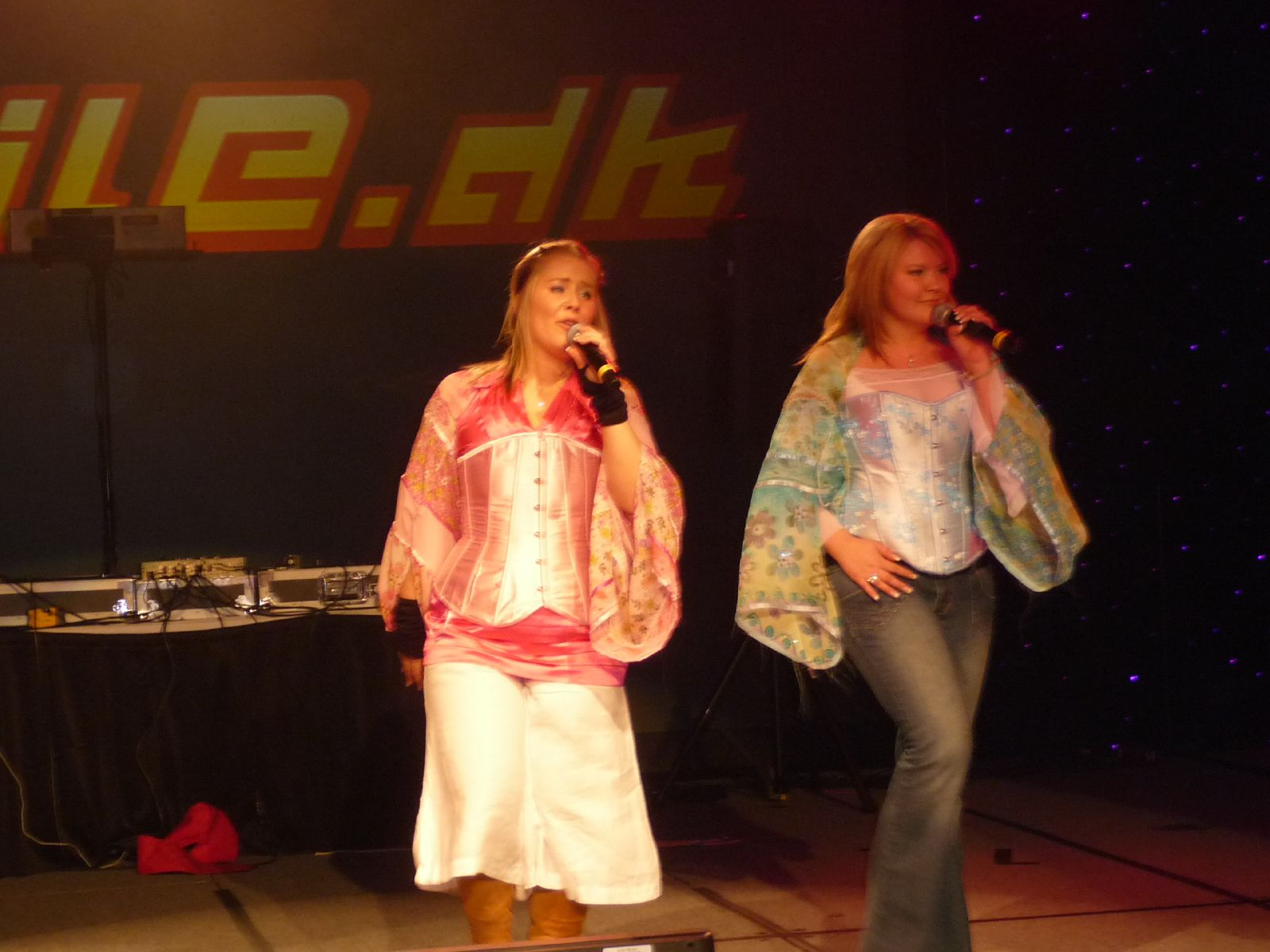
- Smile.dk performing at Sakura-Con in 2009.

Background information
- Origin: Sweden
- Genre: Eurodance
- Years active: 1998–present
- Labels: Parlophone; EMI Music Japan; Avex Asia; Dreamusic Incorporated; Universal Music; GlenDisc; Butterfly Music; SMA
- Members: Veronica Almqvist; Malin Kernby
- Past members: Nina Boquist; Hanna Stockzell; Cecilia Reiskog

Smile.dk (sometimes written SMiLE.dk or Smile-dk, pronounced Smile D-K) or Smile is a Swedish Eurodance act with Veronica Almqvist as the only current member. The band is known for several songs featured in music video games, such as Dance Dance Revolution. They have regularly appeared on Dancemania since its tenth issue. Smile.dk has been one of the most featured acts in the Dancemania series, along with the likes of Captain Jack and E-Rotic.

== History ==
=== 1998–2003: Smile, Future Girls, and Golden Sky ===
Veronica Almqvist and Nina Boquist first formed as Smile, and released their first album Smile in 1998. All songs were written and produced by Robert Uhlmann and Robin Rex. The first single from the album, "Butterfly", was licensed by Konami and featured in the first release of Dance Dance Revolution, a popular dance video game. The second single from the album, "Boys", interpolates Sabrina Salerno's hit "Boys (Summertime Love)". The group was marketed as Smile.dk in Japan, where the album was certified gold for 100,000 copies shipped to stores.

After the release of Smile, Boquist left the group to start a solo career and was replaced by Malin Kernby. Their first studio album release under this line-up was Future Girls in 2000, in which they maintained the group name Smile in Europe, but were marketed as Smile.dk throughout most of Asia. The final album release under this line-up was Golden Sky in 2002, which was released solely in Japan as Smile.dk. From this point on, the group would use this moniker exclusively.

In 2005, according to their manager, Smile.dk had begun a hiatus due to both Almqvist and Kernby getting married; Kernby with a child on the way. However, he did not believe that Smile.dk would become defunct, which proved correct with their return, albeit without Kernby.

=== 2008–2013: Return, line-up changes and Party Around the World ===
In early 2008, Smile.dk's producers Jamie Thompson (J-Mi/DJ Slash/MC Jay) and Dick Örnå (Mr. Dee) announced at the BubblegumDancer.com Forums that Smile.dk would be returning in 2008 with a worldwide single, "Doki Doki", and an album, Party Around the World. It was also announced that Kernby would be leaving the group, and Hanna Stockzell later joined. Then-new singer Stockzell performed in all of the songs on Party Around the World, except for "Doki Doki", which featured only Almqvist and Kernby, despite Kernby no longer being an active member.

Smile.dk (with Almqvist and Stockzell) performed live at San Japan, an anime convention located in San Antonio, Texas, on 9 August 2008, their first performance in North America. They also performed live at Sakura-Con 2009 in Seattle, Washington on 10–12 April 2009.

In April 2010, it was announced that Stockzell would be leaving Smile.dk for personal reasons and to start a solo career. It was also announced that Cecilia Reiskog would be joining as a member. On 20 December 2011, they released their first single with the new line-up called "Moshi Moshi". An animated music video for "Moshi Moshi" was uploaded to Smile.dk's YouTube channel in early 2012. Later in 2012, they confirmed that a song titled "Baby Boom" was being recorded, due to both Almqvist and Reiskog getting pregnant around the same time frame. While work for Smile.dk's new album continued, Smile.dk's progress slowed so Almqvist and Reiskog could focus on their personal lives. On 6 October 2013, Cecilia Reiskog announced on Smile.dk's Facebook page that she would be leaving Smile.dk to focus on her personal life. Almqvist confirmed that she would continue Smile.dk by herself and would not be adding a new member.

=== 2014–present: Forever, Dance Dance, and Malin Kernby's return ===
In 2014, Almqvist confirmed that the act’s next album, The Make-Up Collection, was almost finished and that any songs featuring Reiskog would not be re-recorded and would be released as they are. On 14 August 2015, Almqvist announced that Smile.dk would be going on tour in China from 30 October to 8 November. Later, on 25 October, she announced on Smile.dk's Facebook page that the upcoming album was retitled Forever and would be released in early 2016. The Chinese tour was also moved to early 2016 to coincide with the album release.

On 26 November 2015, the single "Our Little Corner" was released worldwide on major digital music stores.

On 9 May 2016, J-Mi and former Smile.dk member Hannah Stockzell confirmed that their team had collaborated with Smile.dk for a remix EP release called Koko Soko 2016. The EP, containing six mixes, was released on 25 May 2016.

On 28 September 2016, Almqvist posted 16 samples of tracks from the album Forever on Smile.dk's SoundCloud at smiledkmusic. The album contains eight new songs, five remakes and three remixes chosen as winners from the 2015 remix contest.

On 11 April 2026, SMiLE.dk performed live at the Dancemania BIRTHDAY Party in Tokyo. This performance was a one-time reunion for Smile.dk as a tribute to this special event with Veronica Almqvist & Malin Kernby's return to the stage together for the first time since 2002. They had also presented their new single “Dance Dance", being SMiLE.dk's first release as a duo in over 14 years.

== Members ==
Current
- Veronica Almqvist (1998–present)
- Malin Kernby (2000–2008, 2026-present)

Former

- Nina Boquist (1998–2000)
- Hanna Stockzell (2008–2010)
- Cecilia Reiskog (2010–2013)

== Discography ==
=== Albums ===
- Smile (13 July 1998)
- Future Girls (26 July 2000)
- Golden Sky (4 December 2002)
- Party Around the World (13 October 2008)
- Forever (14 July 2017)

=== EPs ===
- Smile Paradise (31 January 2001)
- Koko Soko 2016 (25 May 2016)

=== Singles ===
- "Butterfly" (1998)
- "Coconut" (1998) – No. 10 New Zealand
- "Mr. Wonderful" (1999)
- "Boys" (1999) – No. 28 Sweden
- "Doo Be Di Boy" (2000)
- "Dragonfly" (2001)
- "Domo Domo Domo" (2002)
- "Doki Doki" (2008)
- "Moshi Moshi" (2011)
- "Our Little Corner" (2015)
- "Koko Soko 2016" (2016)
- "A Merry Christmas" (2016)
- "Butterfly (Anniversary Edition)" (2018)
- "Dance Dance" (2026)

=== Music videos ===
- Butterfly (1998)
- Mr. Wonderful (1998)
- Boys (1999)
- Doo Be Di Boy (2000)
- Domo Domo Domo (2002)
- Moshi Moshi (2011)

==== Dancemania ====
- 10 (1998), X1 (1999), X5 (2000), X7 (2000), X8 (2001)
- Delux : 3 (1999), 4 (2000)
- Speed : 2 (1999), 3 (1999), Best 2001 (2000), 6 (2001)

Speed G : 1 (2003), 2 (2003)

- Happy Paradise : 1 (2000), 2 (2001)
- Best Red (2002)
- Ex : 2 (2003), 4 (2003)
- Hyper Delux (2003)
- Treasure (2006)

=== Video games ===
Smile.DK has a total of 9 songs which appear in the Dance Dance Revolution (DDR) arcade series. "Butterfly" was featured in the first game and returned in numerous sequels, appearing in a total of 12 releases, the latest being a cover of the song in Dance Dance Revolution A20. Since Dance Dance Revolution X, "A Geisha's Dream" by Naoki featuring Smile.DK is a recurrent track in the DDR series. Of the 17 main arcade releases, only two omitted music from Smile.DK: DDRMAX and DDRMAX2.

| Song | Arcade game | | | | | | | | | | | | | | |
|---|---|---|---|---|---|---|---|---|---|---|---|---|---|---|---|
| Song | 1st | 2nd | 3rd | 4th | 5th | Ex | SN | SN2 | X | X2 | X3 | 2013 | 2014 | A | A20 |
| "Butterfly" | Yes | Yes | Yes | Yes | Yes | Yes | | | | | Yes | | | | |
| "Boys" | | Yes | Yes | Yes | | | | | | | Yes | | | | |
| "Butterfly (Upswing Mix)" | | | Yes | Yes | | | | | | | | | | | |
| "Mr. Wonderful" | | | Yes | Yes | | | | | | | | | | | |
| "Boys (Euro Mix)" | | | | Yes | Yes | | | | | | | | | | |
| "Petit Love" | | | | 4thMix Plus only | Yes | | | | | | | | | | |
| "Dancing All Alone" | | | | | Yes | | | | | | | | | | |
| "Golden Sky" | | | | | | | Yes | Yes | Yes | Yes | Yes | Yes | | | |
| "A Geisha's Dream" | | | | | | | | | Yes | Yes | Yes | Yes | Yes | Yes | Yes |
| "Butterfly (2008 X-edit)" | | | | | | | | | Yes | Yes | Yes | Yes | Removed on 7 March 2016 | | |
| "Boys (2008 X-edit)" | | | | | | | | | Yes | Yes | Yes | | | | |
| "Koko Soko" | | | | | | | | | Yes | Yes | Yes | | | | |
| "Butterfly (20th Anniversary Mix)" | | | | | | | | | | | | | | | Golden cabinets only |
