= Sky High (song) =

1975 single by Jigsaw

Single by Jigsaw

from the album Sky High
- B-side: "Brand New Love Affair"
- Released: August 1975
- Genre: Disco, pop rock
- Length: 2:53
- Label: Splash (UK), Chelsea (US)
- Songwriters: Clive Scott, Des Dyer
- Producer: Chas Peate

Jigsaw singles chronology
"You're Not the Only Girl" (1974)	"Sky High" (1975)	"Brand New Love Affair" (1976)

"Sky High" is a song by British band Jigsaw. It was released as a single in 1975 and was the main title theme to the film The Man from Hong Kong. The song was a worldwide hit in the latter part of 1975, reaching No. 3 on the Billboard Hot 100 and No. 4 on the Adult Contemporary chart in the United States. It was composed by Clive Scott and Des Dyer of Jigsaw. The orchestral arrangement was by Richard Hewson. It was also a top 10 hit on the UK Singles Chart. The 1975 Australian single was released under the name "British Jigsaw" due to an established and popular local band there at the time also called "Jigsaw".

Two years later, the song gained more striking commercial success in Japan, peaking at No. 2 on the Oricon singles chart and selling approximately 570,000 copies. ZYX Records released an extended 12" version in 1987. A remixed version of the original Jigsaw cut by PWL remixer Pete Hammond was a minor dance hit in the US in the spring of 1989. In a nod to the original 7" single release, "Brand New Love Affair" was also remixed and put on the B-side, but managed to reach No. 66 on the Billboard Hot 100 the following year. The song has been popular in Mexico because of the song's affiliation with Mil Máscaras, a popular luchador enmascarado (masked professional wrestler) who used the song for his entrances.

== Chart history ==
=== Weekly charts ===
Chart (1975–77)	Peak position
Australia (Kent Music Report)	3
Canada RPM Adult Contemporary	3
Canada RPM Top Singles	3
Ireland (IRMA)	9
Japanese Oricon International Singles Chart	1
Japanese Oricon Singles Chart	2
New Zealand (RIANZ)	2
South Africa (Springbok)	20
Swedish Singles Chart	15
UK Singles Chart	9
US Billboard Hot 100	3
US Billboard Adult Contemporary	4

Chart (1989)	Peak position
Australia (ARIA)	101
Ireland (IRMA)	24
UK (Music Week)	92

=== Year-end charts ===
Chart (1975)	Rank
Australia (Kent Music Report)	42
Canada	105
US (Joel Whitburn's Pop Annual)	46

Chart (1976)	Rank
Canada	66
New Zealand	41

== Personnel ==
- Des Dyer - drums, lead vocals
- Clive Scott - keyboards
- Richard Anthony Hewson - arrangements

== Newton version ==
British dance act Newton covered "Sky High" and released it as his debut single on 14 November 1994 featuring Jigsaw's Des Dyer on vocals and in the video. Their version, produced by Mike Stock and Matt Aitken, became a hit, reaching number eight on the Australian Singles Chart and the top 40 in Belgium.

=== Charts ===
Chart (1994–1995)	Peak position
Australia (ARIA)	8
Belgium (Ultratop 50 Flanders)	40
Iceland (Íslenski Listinn Topp 40)	13
Scottish Singles Sales (Official Charts)	62
UK Singles (Official Charts)	56
UK Dance (Official Charts)	20

== See also ==
- List of 1970s one-hit wonders in the United States
