= Butterfly (Smile.dk song) =

Single by Smile.dk

from the album Smile
- B-side: "Get Out"
- Released: 1998
- Genre: Eurodance
- Length: 2:57
- Label: EMI
- Songwriters: Robert Uhlmann; Robin Rex
- Producers: Robert Uhlmann; Robin Rex

Smile.dk singles chronology
"Butterfly" (1998)	"Coconut" (1998)

Music video
- "Smile - Butterfly (Official Music Video)" at YouTube

"Butterfly" is a song by Swedish bubblegum group Smile.dk, from their 1998 album Smile. It was written and produced by Robert Uhlmann and Robin Rex. The song gained popularity outside of Sweden when it was included on the first version of Konami's music video game, Dance Dance Revolution and Dance Dance Revolution 3rdMix. In honor of its popularity, the song was remixed for the franchise's 2008 installment Dance Dance Revolution X, a mix primarily intended to celebrate the 10-year anniversary of the series.

== Sample and rereleases ==
In 2009, the song was re-recorded with Veronica and Malin doing the vocals. This version was released as a single on May 13, 2009, and was titled "Butterfly '09 (United Forces Airplay Edit)".

South African band Die Antwoord sampled the song in their hit "Enter the Ninja", having heard it on Dance Dance Revolution X.

== Cultural impact ==
The song's chorus is notorious for being sampled in many counterfeit toys, mostly toy phones of all shapes and types.

== Film ==
The song was played twice during the 2019 film Flatland. It was briefly featured in the sixth episode of the Marvel Cinematic Universe Disney+ series WandaVision, titled "All-New Halloween Spooktacular!" It played twice for two club scenes in Jia Zhangke's 2024 film Caught by the Tides. The song played in the club scene in Bi Gan's 2025 film Resurrection.

== Official remixes ==
1. Anaconda Remix — 4:21
2. China Power Mix — 1:48
3. Delaction Radio Remix — 3:40
4. Delaction Mix — 5:48
5. Extended Mix — 4:21
6. Hyper-K Mix — 3:23
7. KCP Kung-Fu Mix — 1:34
8. Pan-Ace Radio Mix — 3:00
9. Romance Mix — 2:56
10. S3RL Mix — 4:50
11. United Forces Airplay Edit — 3:07
12. Upswing Mix — 5:25
