= Peter Ravn (artist) =

Danish artist

Peter Rothmeier Ravn (born 1955) is a Danish painter.

His primary practice is figurative oil painting, but he has also worked with sculpture and photography. A recurring motif is anonymous men in suits often caught in scenarios that are difficult to decode.

Among exhibitions are "Di Silvestre/Ravn" at Z2O Galleria Sara Zanin (Rome, Italy, 2010), "Biennale Internazionale dell’Arte Contemporanea" (Brescia, Italy, 2011), "When Men Sleep" at Munkeruphus (2018), "Recovery Position" at Politiken's foyer (2019) and "JAHRESAUSGABEN" in Kunsthalle München (2020).

Since 2017 Peter Ravn has been represented by Gallery Kant in Copenhagen.

In 2018 the partnership I DO ART Agency made a film about Peter Ravn in connection with the exhibition “When Men Sleep”.

Peter Ravn was educated at Kunstakademiets Arkitektskoles Institute for Design in 1980. A part of his studies were conducted in the United States at Syracuse University (Syracuse, N.Y.) and Parsons School of Design (New York, N.Y.). For many years he worked as a graphic designer. He did record sleeves and music videos for many well known Danish artists, such as Gangway, Laid Back, Kim Larsen and Dizzy Mizz Lizzy.
