= Markus Wormstorm =

South African electronic musician (born 1981)

- Born: Markus V Smit; 1981 (age 44–45)
- Genres: Electronic
- Instrument: Piano
- Years active: 2001–present
- Labels: Sound-Ink; M=Maximal; Biblo.tv
- Member of: Markus Wormstorm; The Real Estate Agents; Sweat.X
- Formerly of: The Constructus Corporation
- Website: Official website

Markus Wormstorm (born Markus V Smit; 1981) is a South African electronic musician. He was signed to Sound-Ink Records in New York at 19 and has subsequently collaborated and remixed tracks for artists including MF Doom (as Viktor Vaughn), Burna Boy, and Die Antwoord.

He won the Annie Award for Outstanding Achievement in Music (2024), the Annecy Special Distinction Award, and the SAFTA Award for Best Original Score (2015).

== Biography ==
Wormstorm moved to Cape Town in 2001, where he began collaborating with musicians such as IDM producer Felix Laband.

Wormstorm's early demo recordings brought him to the attention of Waddy Jones, frontman of Johannesburg hip-hop group Max Normal and later of Die Antwoord. When Jones disbanded Max Normal in early 2002, he and Sibot invited Wormstorm to collaborate on Waddy's The Constructus Corporation, which resulted in the concept album and graphic novel The Ziggurat (ADOPECD009 African Dope Records 2002).

Another copy of Wormstorm's demo reached Alex Threadgold, owner of New York-based electronic label Sound-Ink, which resulted in a three-album deal for Wormstorm. His first album for the label, Rachel The Bear, was released in digital-only format in 2006.

Together with Simon Ringrose (Sibot) and his brother Duncan Ringrose, Wormstorm formed the corporate sound design agency 'SAYTHANKYOU', which has won several Gold and Silver Loerie Awards for composition and sound design. Wormstorm's work has been used in advertising campaigns for Metro FM, VR Brandy, Audi, Ford, Nokia, and local mobile network Cell C.

In December 2004, African Dope Records and management label Sshadoworkss released Wormstorm's self-titled debut South African album, bundled as part of a three-CD pack entitled The Real Estate Agents.

Wormstorm is also a writer and music producer for the animation collective The Blackheart Gang, which creates short films. The group's film The Tale of How (2006) toured with RESfest in 2007 and has won several animation awards, including the Canal+ Award at the Clermont-Ferrand Film Festival in France. The film was nominated for the Annecy Cristal and won the Special Distinction Award at the Annecy International Animation Film Festival.

In 2006, Wormstorm launched Sweat X, a collaborative project with vocalist and long-time collaborator Spoek Mathambo. Sweat X signed a deal with the UK label Citinite in March 2007, and toured Europe in June/July 2007.

Wormstorm features in the 2010 South African documentary, The Creators, where he toured through South Africa's Karoo with Sweat X colleague Spoek Mathambo.

In 2013, he released a 12-track album, Not I, but a Friend.

In 2013, Wormstorm founded Honeymoon Studios in Cape Town.

In 2014, he appeared in the documentary Future Sounds of Mzansi where he was interviewed regarding his work in the South African electronic music scene. In that year, he also created an online store called 'The Wormstore' and Honeymoon Podcasts. His studio created three episodes with author Lauren Beukes and historian Max du Preez. In April 2015, Wormstorm won a Safta Award for Best Achievement in Original Score for his work on the feature film Four Corners.

Later that year, he released a self-titled EP under the pseudonym of Akira on his own label, Biblo Records, for digital download.

Wormstorm composed the score for the films Free State (2021) and Death of a Whistle Blower (2023). He also provided the music for "Aau's Song" in the Star Wars: Visions series, for which he won the award for 'Best Achievement for Original Music in TV/Streaming' at the 51st Annie Awards.

== Discography ==
- Markus Wormstorm EP (Sound-Ink, June 2004)
- Rachel The Bear (Sound-Ink, 2006)
- Not I, But A Friend (M=Maximal, 2012)
- Figure in Field (M=Maximal, 2015)
- Hardly Human (Biblo.tv, 2020)
- Theilax Shift (Biblo.tv, 2021)
- A Room Without Shadows (Biblo.tv, 2021)
- Liveware Problem (Biblo.tv, 2021)
- Blindsight (Biblo.tv, 2022)
- Invisible Friend (Biblo.tv, 2021)
- Star Wars: Visions Vol. 2 – Aau's song (Lucasfilm Ltd., 2023)

== Awards ==
- 2005: Bronze Loerie Advertising Award
- 2005: Bronze Craft Clio Award USA
- 2006: Special Distinction Award, Annecy International Film Festival France
- 2007: Nominated for the Annecy Cristal, Annecy International Film Festival, France
- 2007: Best Independent Film Award, Bradford International Film Festival
- 2007: Canal+ Award, Clermont-Ferrand Film Festival, France
- 2007: Excellence Award (Silver), Expose 3
- 2007: Grand Master Award (Gold), Expose 4
- 2007: Artistic Perfection Prize, International Festival of Animation, St Petersburg, Russia
- 2007: Grand Prix of Festival (Golden Peg Bear), Animanima
- 2007: Best Video Creation, Curtocircuito International Short Film Festival
- 2007: Third Prize, Backup Festival
- 2007: Festival Internacional de Cortometrajes France
- 2007: Honorary Mention, Woodstock Film Festival USA 2007 Animated Dreams Grand Prize “Wooden Wolf”, Russia
- 2014: Loeries Awards Craft
- 2015: Safta Award for Best Achievement in Original Score
- 2015: Loerie Awards Craft Best Music
- 2016: Loerie Awards Craft Best Music
- 2017: Loerie Awards Craft Best Music
- 2017: Shortlist Cannes Lion, France
- 2018: Immortal Awards New York nomination, USA
- 2018: Loerie Award
- 2018: CiclopeAfricaAward
- 2018: Ciclope Europe Award, Germany
- 2019: Ciclope Africa Award selection
- 2019: The Lost Botanist Annecy Festival Official VR selection, France
- 2019: biblo.TV's Shave to Remember project is shortlisted for a Cannes Award, France
- 2021: Nomination for Best Original Music. Cyclope Africa
- 2024: Best Achievement in Original Music for TV/Streaming 51st Annie Awards
