= Umshini wami =

Nguni language struggle song

"Umshini wami", also known as "Awuleth' Umshini Wami" (English, Bring My Machine [Gun]), is a Nguni language struggle song used formerly by members of Umkhonto we Sizwe, the military wing of the African National Congress during the struggle against Apartheid in South Africa with machine allegedly referencing machine gun. Nowhere in the song is the term "machine gun" used, but the reference is strong. Most recently, the song is identified with the persona of Jacob Zuma, the ex President of South Africa, and is often sung at rallies which involve him and his supporters, including the ANC Youth League.

== Lyrics ==
Zulu	English
Umshini wami mshini wami [lead] Kawuleth'umshini wami [follower] Umshini wami mshini wami Kawuleth'umshini wami Umshini wami mshini wami Kawuleth'umshini wami Kawuleth'umshini wami Wen'uyang'ibambezela [lead] Umshini wami, kawuleth'umshini wami [follower]	My machine my machine Please bring my machine My machine my machine Please bring my machine My machine my machine Please bring my machine Please bring my machine You're pulling me back My machine, please bring my machine

== Popularity and controversy ==
In October 2006, the song was made available by Zuma's defence fund as a ringtone on its website. The song has gained controversy in 21st-century South Africa because of its association with the violence of the apartheid period, and is seen as misplaced by some people because of the rise in violent crime throughout the country since the current multiracial order began in 1994. In 2008, Zuma expressed displeasure when the song was sung by violent, xenophobic mobs.

In 2011 Die Antwoord released a short film titled Umshini Wam, that was written and directed by Harmony Korine, who also wrote the screenplay for Larry Clark's feature film Kids. The 16-minute short features Ninja and Yo-Landi Visser of Die Antwoord as a disabled couple who are passionate fans of "gangsta rap" and use wheelchairs for mobility.

== See also ==
- Hamba kahle Mkhonto
