= Die Antwoord =

South African hip hop duo

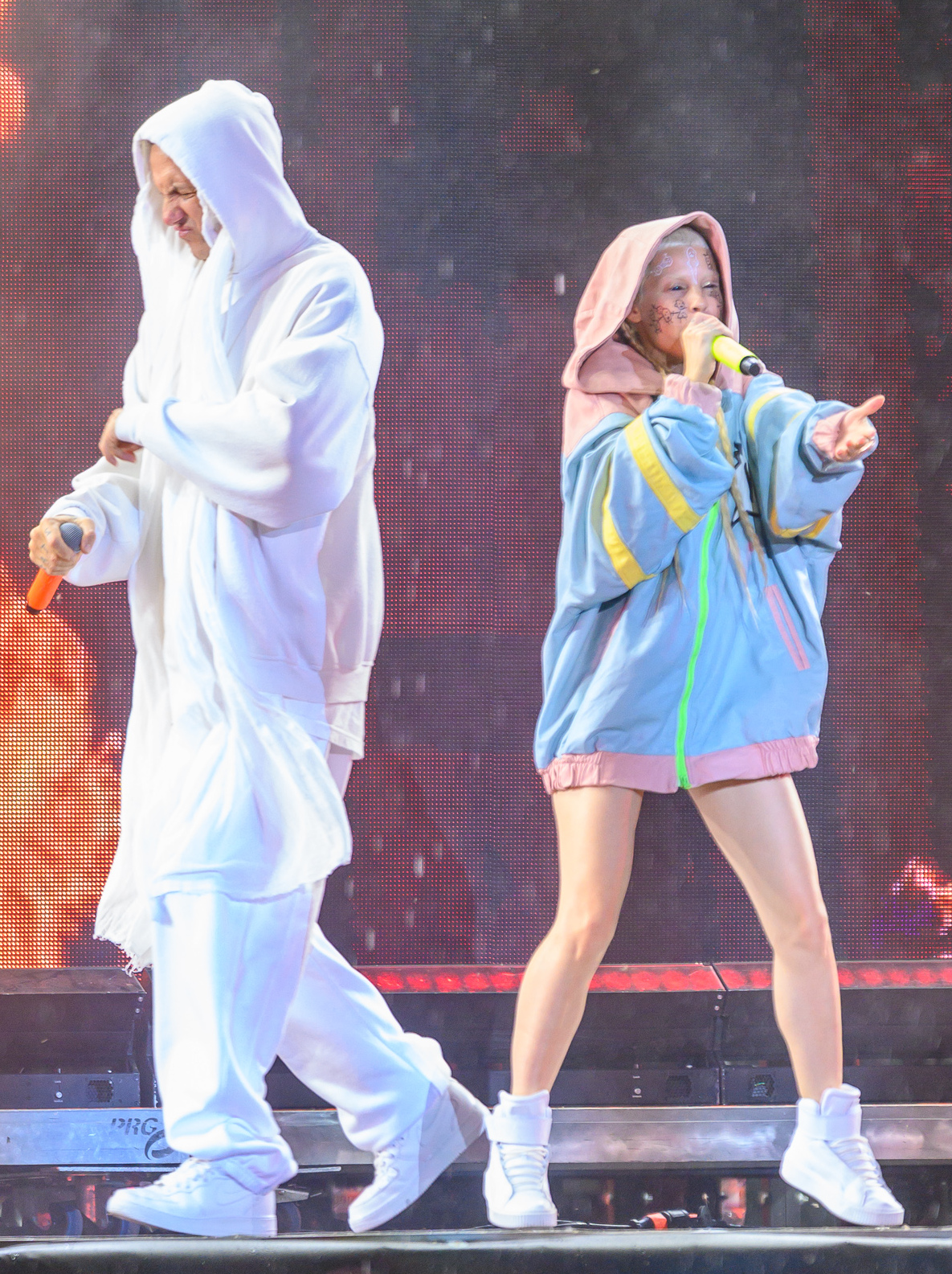
- Die Antwoord performing at Rock im Park in 2019

Background information
- Origin: Cape Town, South Africa
- Genre: Rap-rave
- Years active: 2008–present
- Labels: Zef; Cherrytree; Interscope; Downtown; Polydor
- Spinoff of: MaxNormal.TV; The Constructus Corporation
- Members: Ninja; Yolandi Visser
- Website: dieantwoord.com

Die Antwoord (Afrikaans: [di ˈantvuərt]; Afrikaans for 'The Answer') is a South African hip hop duo formed in Cape Town in 2008. The duo consists of rappers Ninja and Yolandi Visser (also spelled Yo-Landi Visser and stylized as ¥o-Landi Vi$$er). Their music, a fusion of hip hop with rave music, is frequently produced by DJ Hi-Tek, and performed in both English and Afrikaans.

Die Antwoord rose to international fame in 2010 through the virality of the music video for their song "Enter the Ninja" on social media and through blog posts, soon signing to Interscope Records and reissuing their debut studio album, SOS, later that year. They parted ways with Interscope in 2011 and independently released their second studio album, Tension, in 2012. Their follow-up albums, the techno-influenced Donker Mag (2014) and the trap-based Mount Ninji and da Nice Time Kid (2016), became their most commercially successful releases in the United States, each topping Billboard's Top Dance/Electronic Albums chart. They said their fifth studio album, House of Zef, released in 2020, would be their last. However, it was followed by Zama Zama in 2026.

In film, Die Antwoord starred as fictionalized versions of themselves in both Harmony Korine's short film Umshini Wam (2011) and Neill Blomkamp's science fiction film Chappie (2015), while a documentary about them, Zef: The Story of Die Antwoord, was released in 2024. Die Antwoord's style revolves around the South African zef movement, which is largely based on working class Afrikaners and "white trash" motifs. They are known for their graphic and surreal music videos, energetic live performances—particularly at music festivals—and provocative public image. They have faced controversy since their inception for what critics have decried as cultural appropriation of numerous South African groups, the use of blackface in their music videos, homophobia, sexual assault allegations against Ninja, and abuse allegations from their adopted son. They have been regarded as one of the most internationally successful acts to come out of South Africa.

== History ==
=== 2004–2010: Formation, virality and SOS ===
Watkin Tudor Jones, who performed as Waddy Jones, began rapping at age 14, performing at Black nightclubs throughout Johannesburg and fronting various English-speaking hip hop groups. His first group, the Original Evergreen, released two albums through Epic Records and had their 1995 pro-marijuana song "Puff the Magik" banned from South African radio. He began performing under the name Max Normal in 1997 and later released his debut solo studio album, Memoirs of a Clone, under his own name. Max Normal became a band in 2001, consisting of Jones, guitarist Mark Buchanan, drummer Sean Ou Tim, and DJ Sibot, but later disbanded. He founded the horrorcore collective the Constructus Corporation, whose album The Ziggurat was released through African Dope Records in 2002 with an accompanying graphic novel, and released a second solo studio album, The Fantastic Kill, in 2005, also through African Dope.

Around 2003, Jones met Anri du Toit, then a fine art student from Pretoria who was working as a waitress, outside of a club in Cape Town. After meeting again at one of his shows, he asked her to contribute vocals to a Constructus Corporation song. Jones offered to teach du Toit how to rap and they began making music together in 2004—with Jones directing Picnic, a mockumentary about du Toit getting married and having a daughter named Sixteen. Max Normal was later revived as MaxNormal.TV, a motivational hip hop group featuring du Toit, producer Justin de Nobrega, and Jakob Basson that performed in suits and played PowerPoint presentations during performances. In 2008, they released their debut studio album, Good Morning South Africa, and performed at Pukkelpop. Jones also performed under the names Yang Weapon, Metatron One, the Man Who Never Came Back, and MC Totally Rad. He later described his participation in his former acts, with which he did not "really have an emotional connection", as "experimenting, messing around and trying to find Die Antwoord".

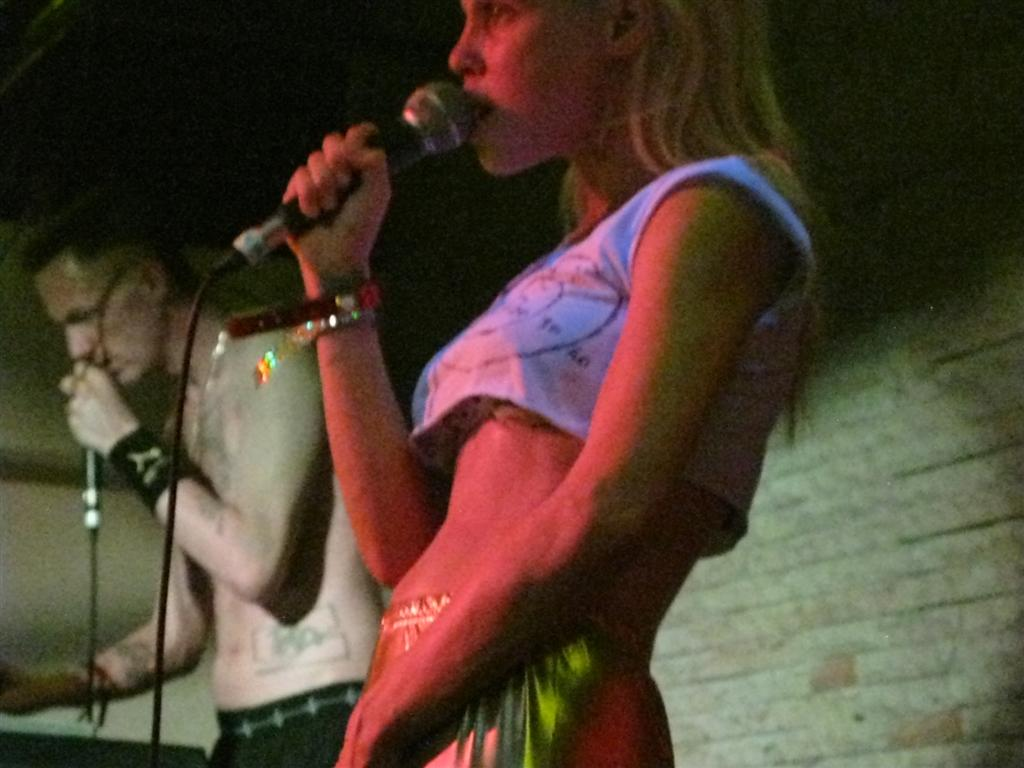
Die Antwoord performing in Melville, Johannesburg in 2009

Die Antwoord formed in 2008 in Cape Town, then consisting of Jones, known as Ninja; du Toit, known as Yolandi Visser and stylized as Yo-Landi Vi$$er; and de Nobrega, the group's producer who went by the name DJ Hi-Tek. Their name is Afrikaans for 'The Answer'. They performed at the South African music festival Oppikoppi and released their debut studio album, SOS, in 2009. The music video for their 2009 single "Enter the Ninja" starred South African DJ Leon Botha, who opened for Die Antwoord's earliest concerts and was notable for being the oldest living person with progeria before his death in 2011 at age 26. It was followed shortly thereafter by a short promotional video titled Zef Side, which was directed by Sean Metelerkamp and featured interviews with the group about their fictitious origin story in a public housing suburb as well as their song "Beat Boy", which samples the 1986 Bronski Beat song "Hit That Perfect Beat". Both videos went viral online after being posted on their website, dieantwoord.com, and shared on blogs such as Boing Boing and Dlisted in February 2010, bringing them attention internationally on social media platforms such as Twitter, Facebook, and YouTube. By the end of 2010, "Enter the Ninja" had received over eight million views on YouTube and was named Myspace's Video of the Year, while Zef Side had over five million views and was one of 25 videos selected for the Guggenheim's YouTube Play exhibit, which showcased video art from YouTube.

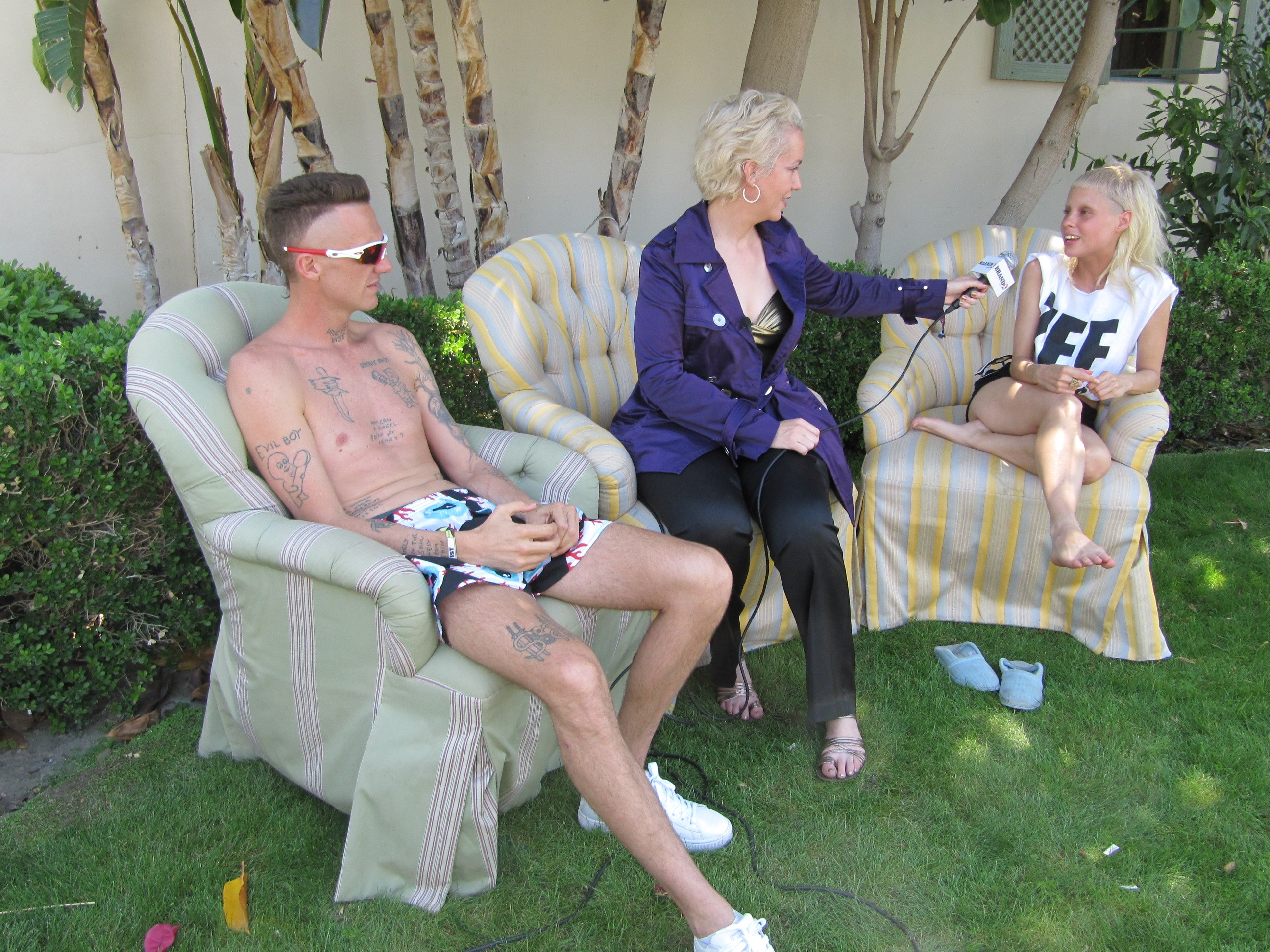
Xeni Jardin of Boing Boing interviewing Die Antwoord at Coachella in 2010

Die Antwoord's plans to release their debut studio album through Dutch record label Magnetron Music fell through by mid-February 2010. Die Antwoord met with Jimmy Iovine to sign a US$1 million deal with Interscope Records, which they announced in May 2010. They made their debut performance in the United States at Coachella, which was retrospectively described by Caroline Ryder of Dazed as "the most buzzed-about performance of the festival". Their debut extended play (EP), 5, was released on 12 July 2010 through Cherrytree and Interscope Records. SOS, which had previously been released online for free with 23 tracks, was reissued with 10 tracks, including by Interscope in the United States and by Polydor Records in the United Kingdom, on 12 October 2010. It peaked at number four on Billboard's Top Dance/Electronic Albums chart and, by 2011, had sold 26 thousand copies. It was preceded in October 2010 by the single "Evil Boy", featuring teenage Xhosa rapper Wanga Jack and produced by Diplo. Its lyrics take a stance against the practice of ulwaluko, a Xhosa initiation rite involving circumcision. Ninja stated in 2010 that SOS was the first in a five-album plan.

Also in 2010, Visser and Ninja adopted Gabriel du Preez, a then–nine-year-old with hypohidrotic ectodermal dysplasia from Vrededorp, after Ben Jay Crossman, a photographer who frequently collaborated with Die Antwoord, photographed him and his family for a documentary about Vrededorp. They nicknamed him Tokkie and he was later featured in several of their music videos including "I Fink U Freeky". Die Antwoord performed at the London Electronic Dance Festival alongside Aphex Twin in August 2010 and on Jimmy Kimmel Live! in October 2010, where they performed "Enter the Ninja". By late 2010, they had become "arguably the first-ever pop phenomenon to spring out of Cape Town", according to Interview's T. Cole Rachel.

=== 2011–2012: Interscope departure and Tension ===
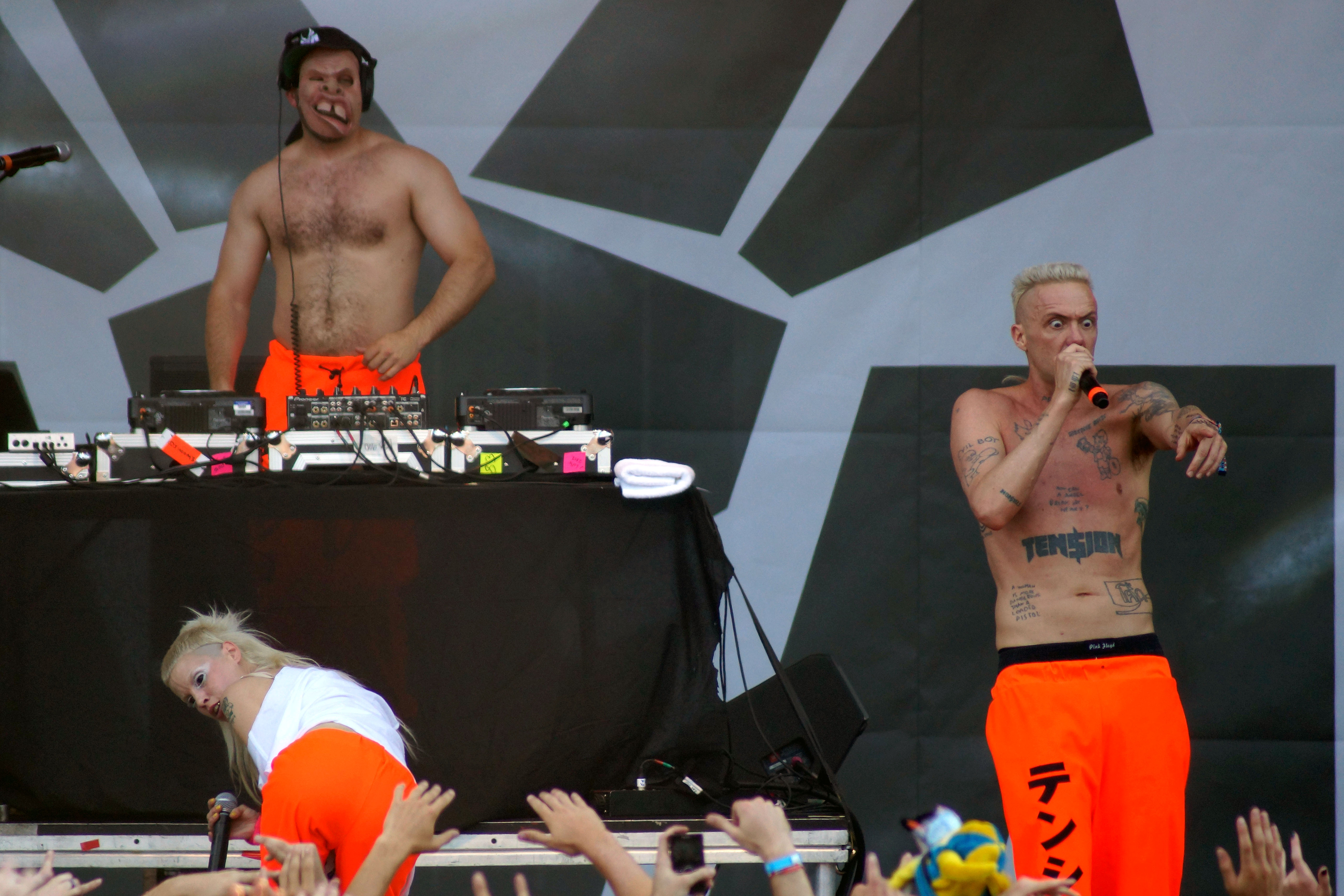
Die Antwoord performing at Lollapalooza in 2012

Karin Nelson described Die Antwoord in W as "the biggest pop sensation ever to come out of South Africa" in 2011. Mathilde Boussion of Le Monde later wrote that they had become "South Africa's most famous musical group abroad" in the early 2010s. They performed at the Australian Big Day Out festival in January 2011. They were nominated for the Left Field Woodie at the 2011 Woodie Awards, which was won by Kanye West. The duo starred as wheelchair-using versions of themselves in Harmony Korine's short gangster film Umshini Wam, named after a Zulu protest song of the same name. It premiered at South by Southwest in March 2011 before being released online the following day. For Vulture, Amos Barshad praised the film as "a thoroughly engaging fifteen minutes" that "smartly stirs up the Die Antwoord argument". Also that month, a music video for their song "Rich Bitch" was released. They were an opening act for Linkin Park on European dates of their Projekt Revolution tour in June 2011.

In November 2011, Die Antwoord left Interscope Records over disputes concerning their upcoming album, Tension, including over the vulgarity of its lead single "Fok Julle Naaiers" (which translates to 'Fuck You All' in Afrikaans) and, according to Ninja, label executives suggesting that they focus the album on collaborations with Interscope labelmates such as Lady Gaga, the Black Eyed Peas, and Far East Movement, to which they objected. Visser also stated that Interscope "kept pushing us to be more generic" in order to make more money. Die Antwoord formed their own independent label, Zef Recordz, and released "Fok Julle Naaiers" that same month with a video. They announced Tension's release date and tracklist the following month. Die Antwoord aimed for Tension to be "an exact continuation of SOS".

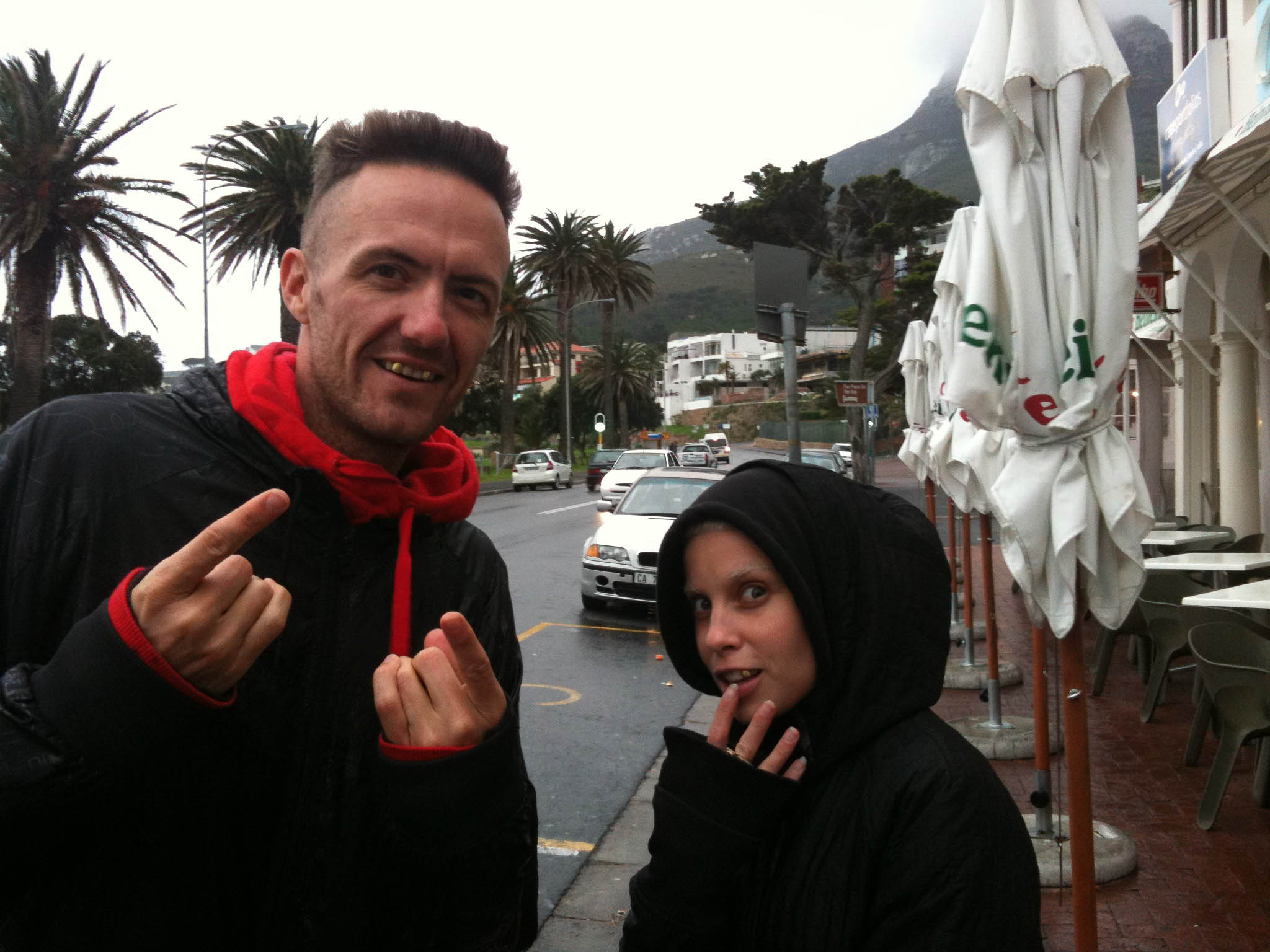
Die Antwoord in 2012

Tension's second single, "I Fink U Freeky", was released in January 2012 alongside a music video co-directed by Ninja with photographer Roger Ballen, featuring recreations of scenes from Ballen's photo books Boarding House and Shadow Chamber. It won the award for Best Music Video at the 20th Plus Camerimage film festival in Poland and was praised by The Guardian's Andrew Frost as a rare success among collaborations between contemporary artists and popular musicians. By October 2012, the video had more than 16 million views. They also performed the song the following month on the Late Show with David Letterman. Die Antwoord released Tension on 7 February 2012 through Zef Recordz, in association with the Good Smile Company, which also collaborated with the group to release vinyl toys of their character Evil Boy, resembling Casper the Friendly Ghost with an oversized erection. Downtown Records handled and distributed the record worldwide. The Observer gave the record three out of five stars, with Ally Carnwath writing that, though "the cheap thrills of [Die Antwoord's] fairground synths have palled" since SOS, their "double act still sounds weird and abrasive in the best possible way". Camille Dordero of Spin derided Tension as "a thumping collection of skits" that "hews a little too close to the fake-gangster thing to be nearly as fun [as SOS]", also hypothesizing that it was "deliberately bad" and "ruthless white-rap pastiche", while Derek Staples of Consequence wrote that, despite its "foul-mouthed impish fun", Tension "could have benefited from some artistic restraint" and "doesn't offer much punch or cohesive power".

Die Antwoord went on an American tour starting shortly after Tension's release and, that summer, at the request of guitarist Dave Navarro, toured as an opener for the alternative rock band Jane's Addiction. "Baby's on Fire", the third single from Tension, was released in June 2012 with a music video wherein Ninja and Visser play siblings arguing over Visser's lover. They went on tour from June to October throughout Europe and the United States to support the release of Tension. Their single "Fatty Boom Boom" and its music video were released in October 2012. The music video was met with controversy due to Visser appearing in blackface, which she responded to by stating that she "doesn't know what blackface is". It also experienced an uptick in views due to a Twitter feud between the duo and Lady Gaga, who is depicted in the video being eaten by a lion. Visser and Ninja fronted a campaign for Alexander Wang's T collection in February 2012. Tension was followed up with a non-album single, "Xpensiv Shit", in July 2012.

=== 2013–2014: Donker Mag ===
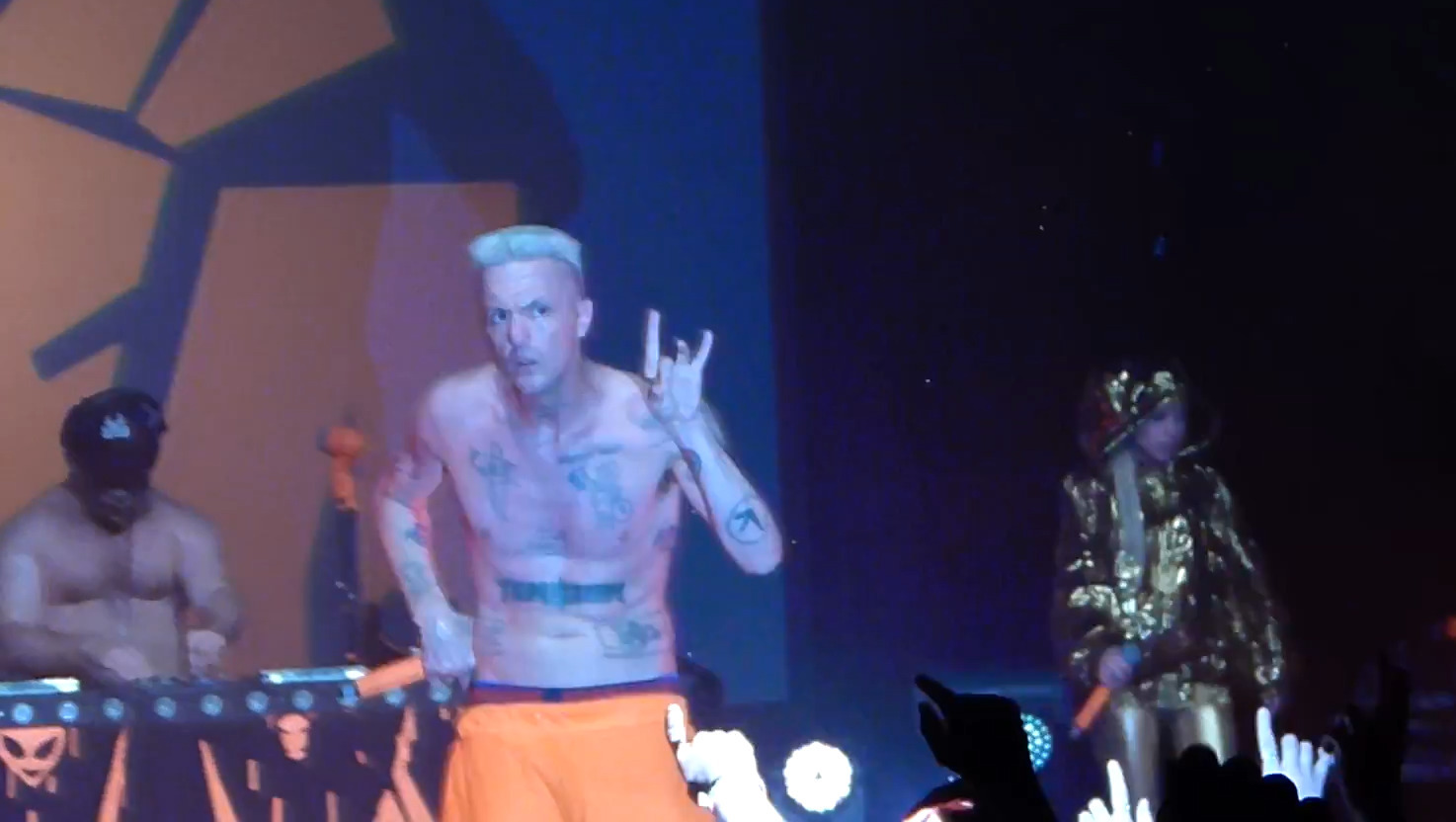
Die Antwoord performing at Tivoli in 2013

Die Antwoord set out on their Blonde All Over Tour across Europe from June to July 2013. In June 2013, they released "Cookie Thumper!", the lead single for their third studio album, which was accompanied by a music video released by Noisey. The song and its video depict Visser as an orphaned schoolgirl in a relationship with a drug dealer from the Numbers Gang named Anais who gets released from prison and has anal sex with her. The song and video received mixed reception from audiences upon their release.

In February 2013, Die Antwoord opened for the Red Hot Chili Peppers on their I'm with You World Tour during their stops in Johannesburg and Cape Town. They posted on their Facebook page in late 2013, confirming reports that they would be appearing in Neill Blomkamp's science fiction film Chappie. A September 2013 story in the Johannesburg-based newspaper City Press cited allegations from Cape Town farmer Andre Laubscher that Ninja had stolen Die Antwoord's image from the Glue Gang Boys, a teenage hip hop group who lived on Laubscher's farm and worked as backup dancers for the group, whom Ninja allegedly supplied with alcohol and drugs. Wanga Jack, who had been a member of the Glue Gang Boys before working as Die Antwoord's DJ and roadie, claimed that the group stole his artwork to create their Evil Boy character, underpaid him for his contributions to the group, and had him sign an illegal contract with Interscope while he was a minor. Die Antwoord responded to the claims in an eight-part Facebook post, calling Laubscher a "creepy old man" who, they alleged, had tried to convince Visser to let him take nude photographs of her while she was staying there and had convinced Jack, whom they allegedly fired due to his unprofessionalism, to fabricate his story after discovering that they had been cast in Chappie.

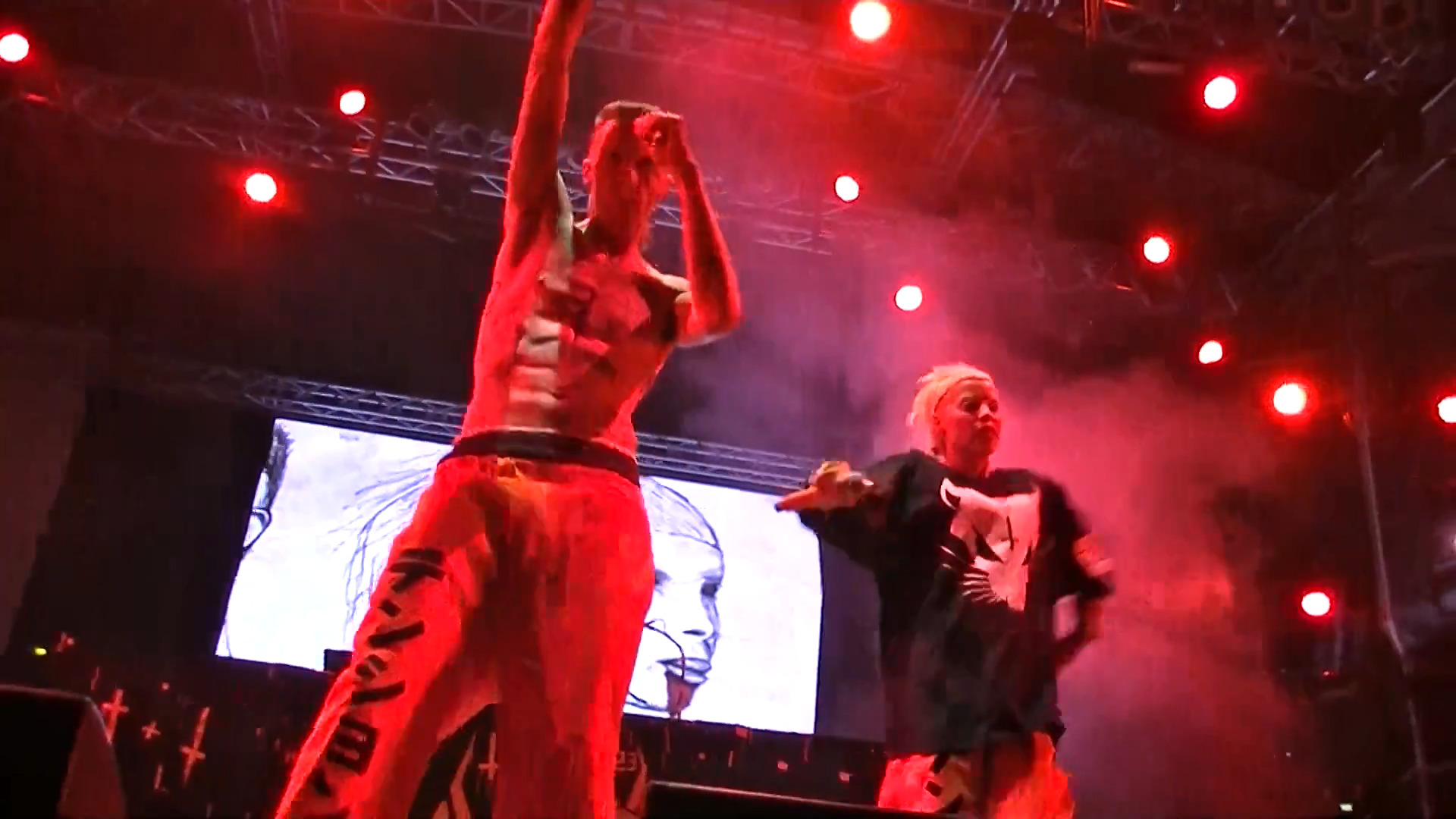
Die Antwoord performing in Budapest Park in 2014

In May 2014, Die Antwoord announced the title and cover of their third album, Donker Mag, and released its second single "Pitbull Terrier" with a music video directed by Ninja, in which he plays a dog that wreaks havoc on the public. Donker Mag was released on 3 June 2014 through Zef Recordz. It became their most commercially successful release in the United States at the time, reaching their then-highest peak on the Billboard 200 at number 37 and topping the Dance/Electronic Albums chart after selling seven thousand copies in its opening week. David Jeffries of AllMusic praised it as being "as inspired, awful, and awesome as their debut" and lacking the "dead spots" he found on Tension, while Adam Finley of PopMatters wrote that, though it was "not a great album overall", it presented "proof that Die Antwoord's multimedia odyssey isn't out of surprises just yet". Lior Phillips of Rolling Stone wrote in a two-and-a-half out of five star review of the album that it had "a stale whiff of déjà vu" and "pl[ied] similar ground to their first two [albums]".

By the release of Donker Mag, Ninja and Visser had ended their romantic relationship with one another. Die Antwoord went on an international tour in support of Donker Mag from May to September 2014. The album's third and final single, "Ugly Boy", was released in November 2014. Its music video was directed by Ninja and featured cameos from Cara Delevingne, Jack Black, Marilyn Manson, Dita Von Teese, and Flea, among others. It also faced controversy for featuring a man in a blackface mask resembling Aphex Twin, whose song "Ageispolis" is sampled on "Ugly Boy".

=== 2015–2016: Suck on This, Chappie, and Mount Ninji and da Nice Time Kid ===
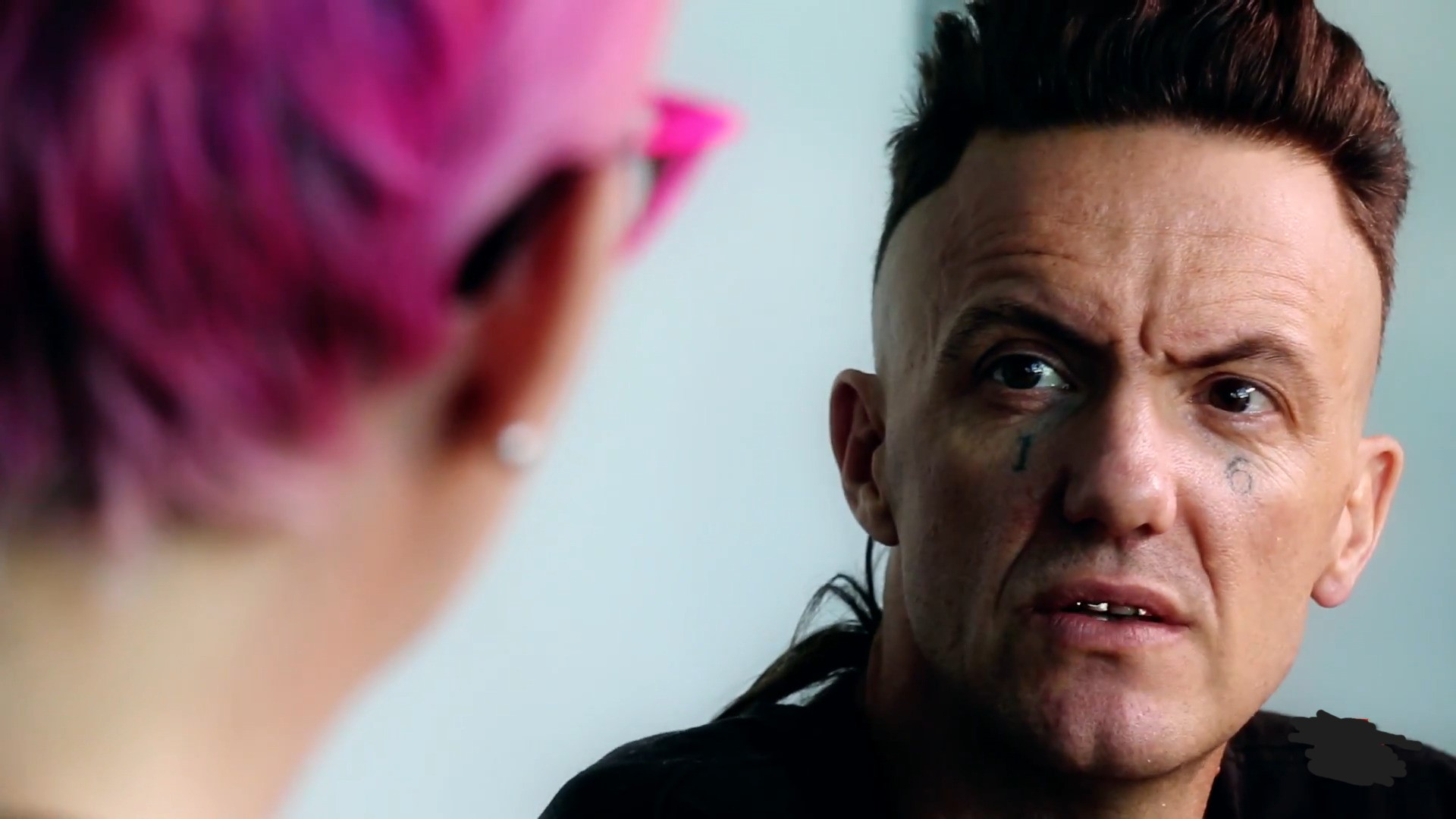
Ninja in an interview with Xeni Jardin for Boing Boing in 2015

Prior to the release of Chappie, cast and crew members, including Blomkamp's longtime collaborator Brandon Auret, repeatedly spoke out against Ninja's on-set behavior, leading Blomkamp to write him out of a scene and lessen his appearance in promotional materials. Chappie was released on 6 March 2015 in the United Kingdom and United States. In it, Ninja and Visser star as fictionalized versions of themselves alongside Jose Pablo Cantillo, who collectively portray a trio of drug dealers that abducts the film's eponymous robot (voiced by Sharlto Copley) to assist them with heists while mentoring him on how to be a gangster. It was critically maligned, largely due to the duo's performances in the film. Mike Ryan of Uproxx wrote that he was "actively waiting for their characters to die" and that "Blomkamp could have actually pulled this story off" had he not cast them, while Anthony Lane wrote for The New Yorker that Visser and Ninja were "the prime offenders" among "a phalanx of poor performances" within the film. Entertainment Weekly's Kyle Anderson wrote that their performances were "distracting at best and disastrous at worst". In October 2016, Ninja posted on Instagram that the duo should have been given an art direction credit on the film after having painted a "secret lair" that appeared therein, which was instead credited to "some fat fuck".

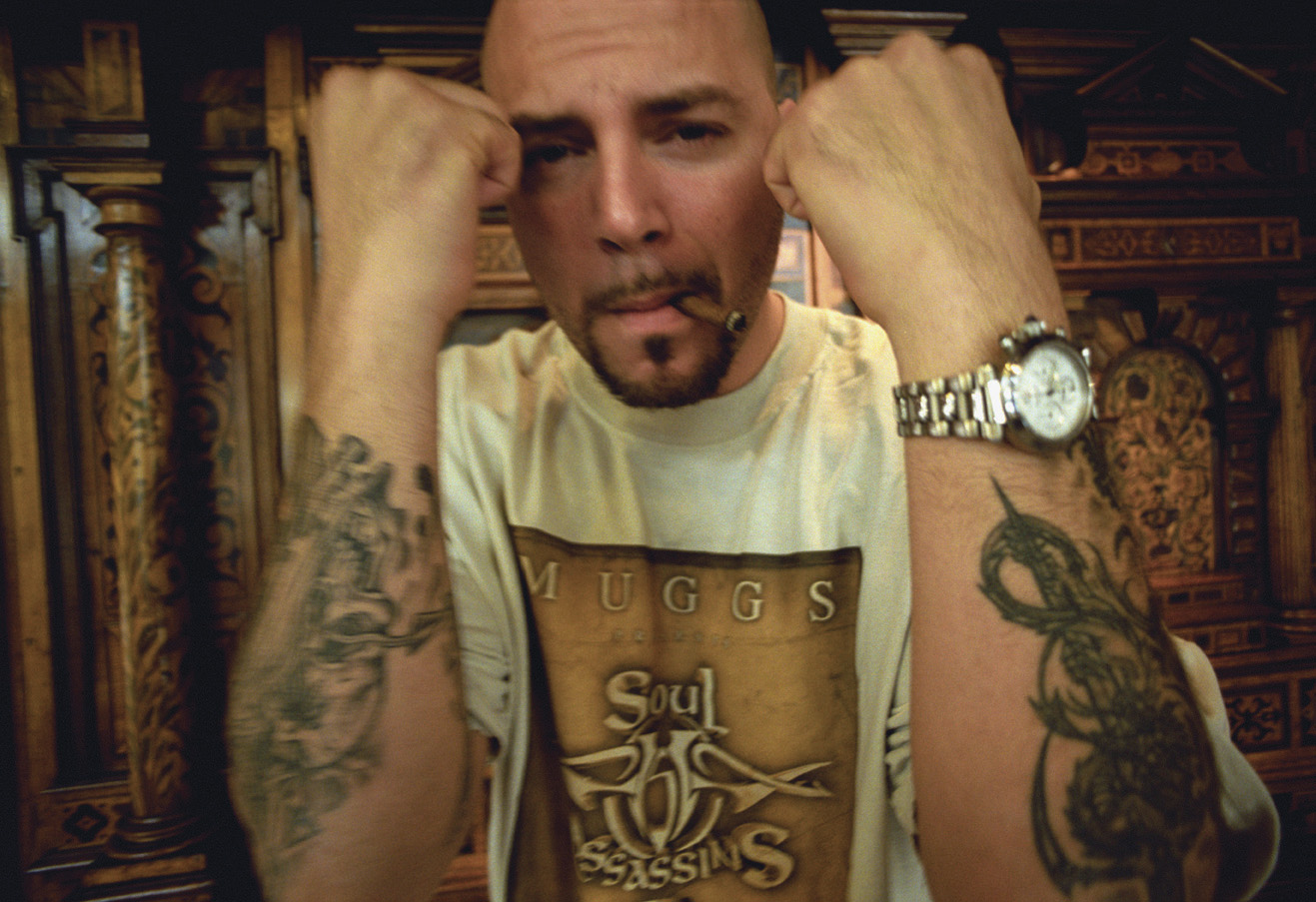
DJ Muggs of Cypress Hill produced much of Die Antwoord's 2016 projects Suck on This and Mount Ninji and Da Nice Time Kid

Ninja and Visser met DJ Muggs, a founding member of the hip hop group Cypress Hill and one of their musical idols, when photographer Estevan Oriol introduced them to him at a quinceañera in East Los Angeles. Die Antwoord first collaborated with him on their song "Rat Trap 666" from Donker Mag and moved to Los Angeles in 2015 in order to work with him on their upcoming album, which was then titled Rats Rule. In January 2015, they went on a four-stop tour of the United Kingdom. On 19 May 2016, the duo released their debut mixtape, Suck on This, on their website and on DatPiff. It featured production from DJ Muggs, known on the album as the Black Goat, and DJ Hi-Tek, going by his alias God. It was preceded by the release of singles "Dazed and Confused", "Bum Bum", and "Gucci Coochie", the last of which featured Dita Von Teese and for which a music video teaser was released.

Die Antwoord performed for the first time in Israel in June 2016 in Rishon LeZion, going against requests from the Palestinian-led Boycott, Divestment and Sanctions (BDS) movement's South African branch for the duo to cancel their performance due to parallels between South African apartheid and Israeli apartheid. Their performance took place on the same day as a mass shooting in Tel Aviv. Die Antwoord went on their international Mount Ninji and Da Nice Time Kid Tour from July to October 2016, with its North American leg including performances at Lollapalooza and Austin City Limits. After their tour stop at the Reading and Leeds Festivals, Ninja posted on Instagram that they would "never be playing at [the] festivals ever again" due to "how disrespectful" their organisers were. They partnered with the Northern California-based cannabis retailer Natural Cannabis to release Zef Zol (zol being South African slang for a joint) in August 2016, their line of cannabis products including a vape pen, edibles, a mouth spray, and a lip balm.

In July 2016, it was announced that Die Antwoord's upcoming album would be titled Mount Ninji and da Nice Time Kid after previously being announced with the title We Have Candy. The album's lead single "Banana Brain", also released in July, peaked at number 30 on the Dance/Electronic Songs chart to become their first song to appear on a Billboard song chart. Its drug-themed music video was released in August 2016 and they performed the song on Jimmy Kimmel Live! the following month, which Tom Breihan of Stereogum described as "one of the most spazzed-out, high-energy TV performances in recent memory". The album's single "Fat Faded Fuck Face" was released in September 2016. Its video, directed by Visser, was compared by critics to a horror movie and featured nudity.

Mount Ninji and Da Nice Time Kid was released on 16 September 2016. It was produced by the Black Goat and God and featured guest appearances from the child rapper Lil Tommy Terror, Jack Black, Dita Von Teese, and Sen Dog, also of Cypress Hill. It became their second release to top Billboard's Dance/Electronic Albums chart and surpassed the American commercial success of Donker Mag, selling 11 thousand copies in its opening week, which gave it the fourth best-performing opening week of any album on the chart in 2016. Jon Falcone of Drowned in Sound complimented it on its "huge rap tunes" while Dave Beech of The Line of Best Fit wrote that it was "rooted deeply in the affection both Ninja and Yo-Landi still quite clearly have for each other". Conversely, it was criticized by Max Totsky of PopMatters as "too obnoxious when it's not boring and too boring when it's not obnoxious" and by Saby Reyes-Kulkarni of Pitchfork as "too faded and immature to make a lasting dent on the face of hip-hop".

In a September 2016 interview with Exclaim!'s Daryl Keating, Ninja stated that the group would be disbanding in September 2017, stating, "Die Antwoord dies on that day. It's all over. I feel beautiful about it." Visser soon responded to the interview in an Instagram post, writing that Keating had misconstrued Ninja's words and that they would not be breaking up, though their fifth album would still be their last. Exclaim!, in turn, published Keating's full, unedited interview with Ninja to confirm that he had announced the group's end being in September 2017.

=== 2017–2018: Scrapped Book of Zef album ===
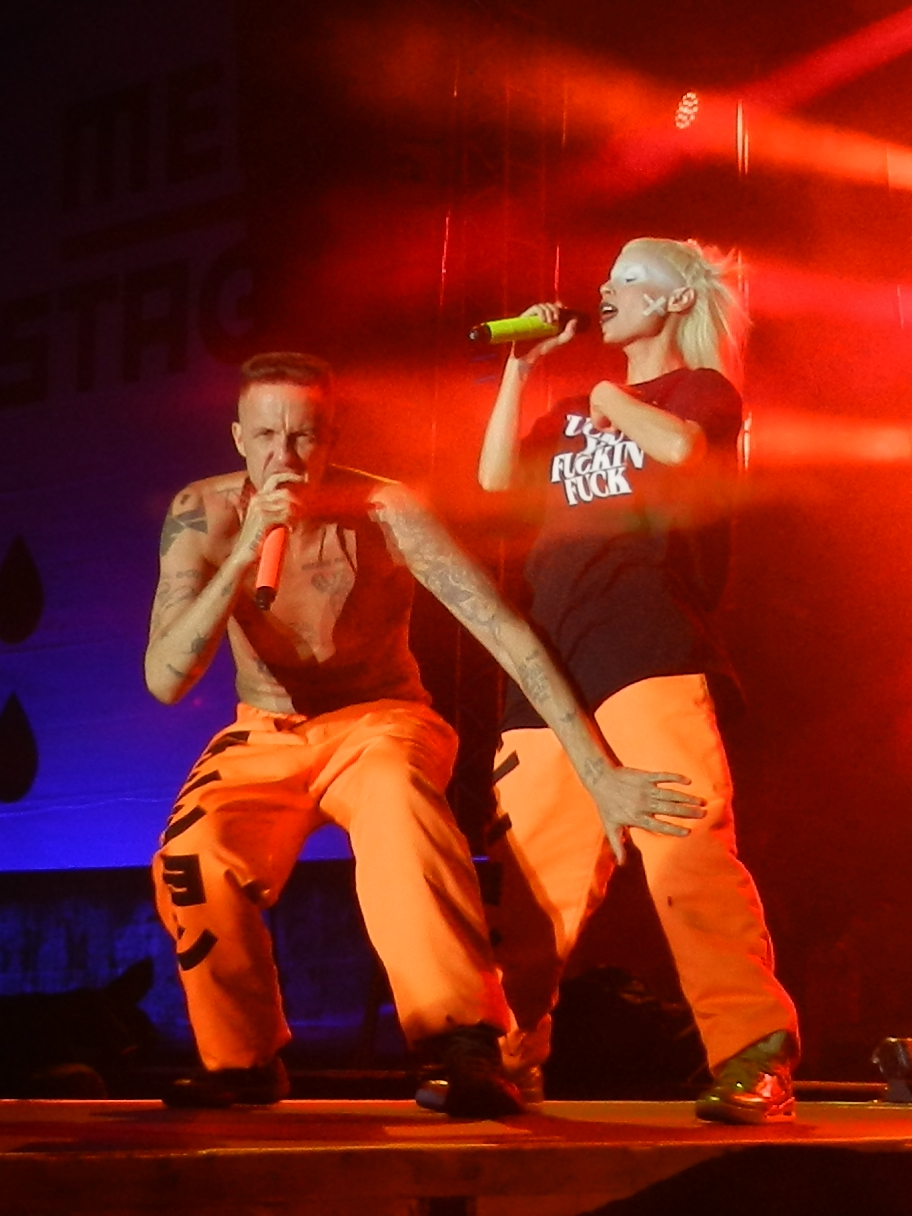
Die Antwoord performing at Melt Festival in 2017

Ninja was featured in Alexander Wang's S/S 2017 campaign in January 2017. In May 2017, Die Antwoord announced via Instagram that they planned to release their fifth studio album, then titled The Book of Zef, as their last, and released its planned lead single, "Love Drug". They embarked on the Love Drug World Tour from May to September of that year. They released Tommy Can't Sleep in June of that year, a short film starring their daughter Sixteen Jones and Jack Black, and directed by Yolandi Visser using black-and-white, grotesque imagery inspired by photographer Roger Ballen. It was followed on July by a trailer for a television series they were creating, South African Ninja. They then announced in June 2018 that their final album would instead be titled 27 and would feature 27 songs, many of which would be collaborations and would be released over the course of the following year. The scheduled lead single of that album, "Golden Dawn", was released in the summer of 2018, though 27 was never released.

Die Antwoord announced in April 2018 that they would be performing in Israel in August. Due to calls from the African National Congress for South African artists to boycott performing in Israel in solidarity with the Palestinians, the announcement received backlash from social media users. They canceled the performance in June 2018. They posted a freestyle diss track against Eminem to their YouTube channel in September 2018 as a response to his diss of them on the song "Greatest" from his album Kamikaze, a continuation of their feud that began after Eminem mispronounced the duo's name on his 2017 single "Untouchable".

=== 2019–2024: House of Zef, assault and abuse allegations ===
In March 2019, Australian rapper Zheani released "The Question", a diss track against Die Antwoord accusing the duo of sex trafficking her to South Africa, resulting in online attention. Visser denied the claims on Instagram and accused Zheani of "clout chasing". Six months later, Zheani filed a police report against Ninja in Queensland, accusing him of having violently sexually assaulted her in 2013 in Wilderness and of sharing revenge porn of her to his Chappie castmates. She alleged that Visser connected her to Ninja, and they began to exchange emails. Ninja reportedly wrote that he loved Zheani while comparing her to his daughter, sent her explicit photos, and arranged for her to visit him in South Africa. According to her, he continued to email her after the assault, which he described as a "ritual". American singer Dionna Dal Monte, who became known in the Italian media for having a swastika tattooed on her breast, also came forward to allege that Ninja had sexually assaulted her in Italy in 2014.

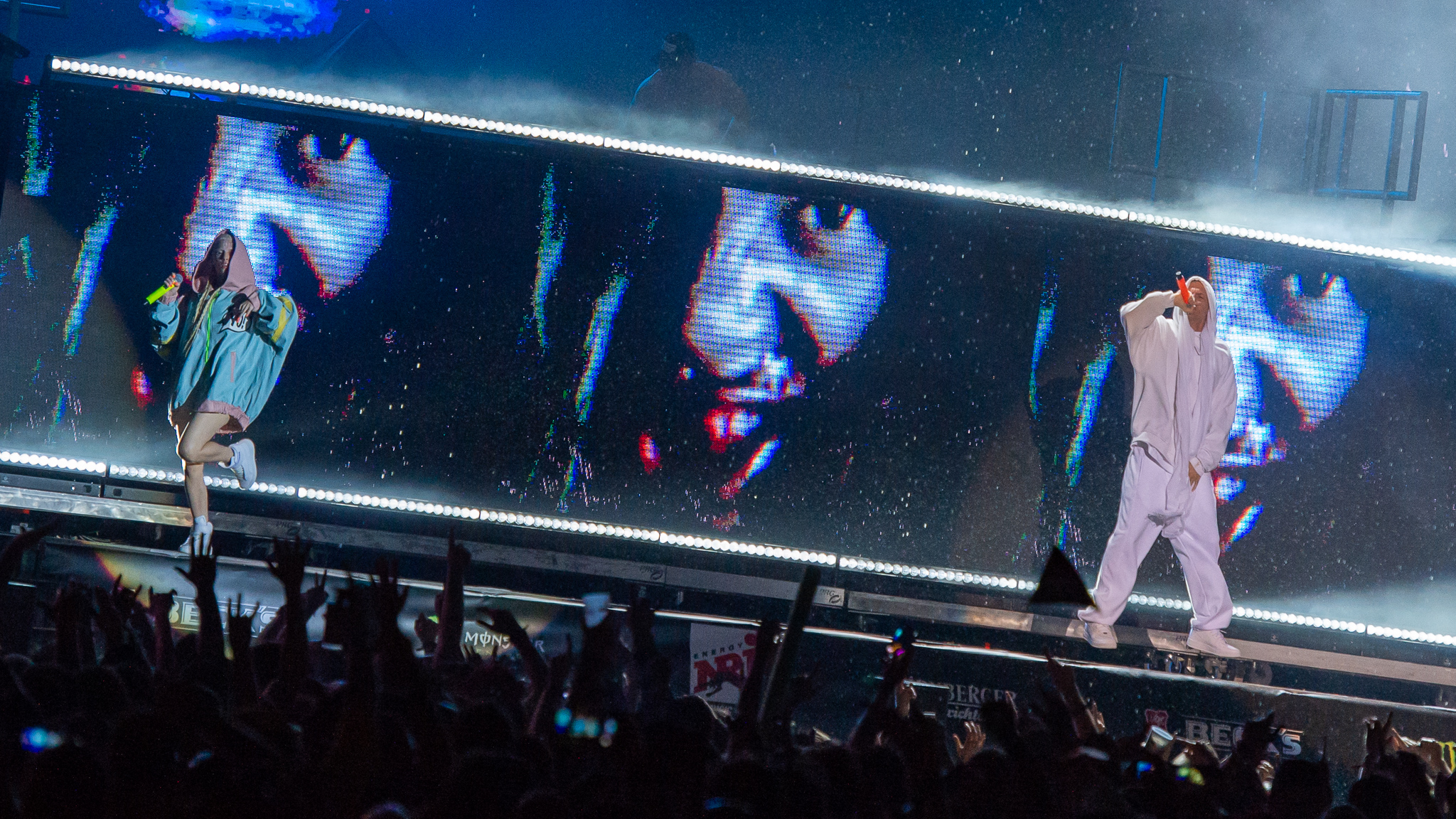
Die Antwoord performing at Rock im Park in 2019

In August 2019, a video of Die Antwoord filmed by Crossman in 2012 resurfaced, showing the duo at Future Music Festival physically assaulting Hercules and Love Affair frontman Andy Butler, who is a gay man, and chasing after him while yelling, "Run, faggot, run," before telling a fabricated story to festival security about Butler groping Visser in a bathroom stall. Soon after the video resurfaced, they were dropped from the lineups of the American music festivals Life is Beautiful, Louder Than Life, and Riot Fest, the last of which saw them replaced with Wu-Tang Clan. Ninja wrote in a Facebook post that Crossman "cleverly edited" the video to make it look like a homophobic hate crime despite his own participation in assaulting Butler. Die Antwoord's House of Zef Tour, which was scheduled in the United States from September to October 2019, was postponed in September 2019, ostensibly due to their occupation with other projects. Chelsey Norris of the Dallas Observer surmised that the tour's postponement was instead due to the resurfaced video involving Butler.

Die Antwoord's gqom single "Baita Jou Sabela", featuring South African rapper Slagysta, was released in November 2019 with a music video, depicting Ninja and Slagysta as South African prisoners. Their fifth studio album, House of Zef, was produced by Chris Tabron and released on 16 March 2020. It received little media attention. Die Antwoord were scheduled to perform at the British music festival ALT + LDN in 2021, but were taken off of the lineup in May of that year after Zand and Bob Vylan, both acts on the lineup, spoke out against their performing there due to their history of alleged abuse.

In May 2022, Visser and Ninja's adoptive son, du Preez appeared in a 45-minute-long video interview published by the South African news organization News24 and conducted by Crossman, in which he described his childhood growing up with them. He stated that the duo adopted him "to be a slave"; exposed him to drugs, gang activity, pornography, and weapons; convinced him that he was "the king of hell"; encouraged violent behavior between him and his brother, Adri, such as when they congratulated du Preez after he stabbed Adri three times; told him to mock his biological family for being poor as they recorded it; abandoned him with an au pair for two years in Johannesburg while they lived in Los Angeles; and sexualized his older adoptive sister. He added that he had cut off all contact with them two years prior to the interview. Die Antwoord denied the claims and called them fabrications in a statement posted to their website. Du Preez's au pair and Crossman, who described Die Antwoord as "violent people" whom he "want[ed] nothing to do with", both corroborated the duo exposing du Preez to drugs, violence, and sex. Later that month, social workers investigated the wellbeing of their biological daughter in Cape Town in response to du Preez's allegations. In June of that year, American rapper Danny Brown appeared on an episode of the podcast 2 Bears 1 Cave, where he accused Ninja of having sexually assaulted him at a nightclub in Paris, describing Ninja's behavior as "aggressive" and stating that he sat on his lap and tried to kiss and have sex with him while propositioning him for a threesome with Visser.

Die Antwoord created the song "Baruch in Jou Oeg" as part of their performance with the nonprofit musical organization Baruch at the annual South African minstrel festival Tweede Nuwe Jaar in January 2023, which social media users criticized as a form of cultural appropriation. A documentary about the duo's origins, Zef: The Story of Die Antwoord, was directed by Jon Day, narrated by their daughter, Sixteen Jones, and released in March 2024. In 2024, they went on their Reanimated Tour in Europe from March to April, their Flame On Muddafucka Tour in North and South America from October to November, and their Zef Winter Wonderland Tour, again in Europe, from November to December.

=== 2026: Zama Zama ===
Die Antwoord's sixth studio album, Zama Zama, was released on June 20, 2026.

== Artistry ==
=== Musical style ===
Die Antwoord's lyrics, which are performed in Afrikaans and English, are known for their obscenity, boastfulness, and themes of sex and wealth. They have also performed in Xhosa. Their music is a fusion of hip hop with EDM production that has routinely been referred to as "rap-rave" or "rave-rap". Ninja has described their music as pop music. Their work is considered by critics to be satirical of the music industry, gangsta rap, South African racial identity, and commercialized hip hop. SOS had house beats and involved elements of crunk, grime, baile funk, and techno. Their music became more pop-leaning with the release of their album Tension in 2012, with beats inspired by EDM of the 1990s, while 2014's Donker Mag was partially based in 1990s techno and dubstep. They incorporated trap music into 2016's Mount Ninji and da Nice Time Kid, which also featured more personal lyrics from Visser. Their albums also frequently feature skits. Visser's rapping voice has been regarded for its high-pitched, childlike qualities, while Ninja's rapping style has been described as hypermasculine and fast-paced. Visser takes musical inspiration from artists such as Björk, PJ Harvey, Marilyn Manson, Aphex Twin, and Nine Inch Nails, while Ninja has stated that he is influenced by hardcore hip-hop of the 1990s.

=== Visuals, fashion, and live performances ===
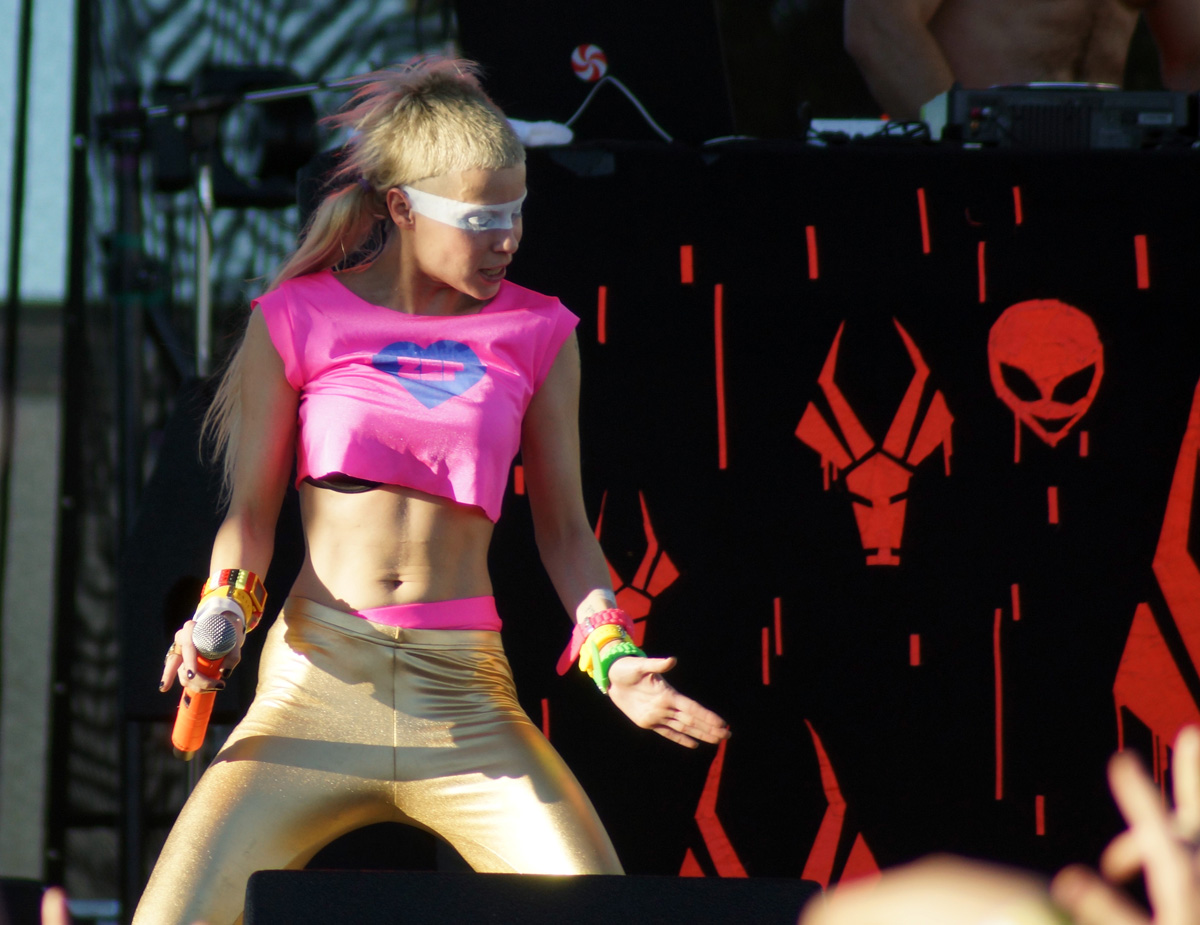
Visser performing at Austin City Limits Music Festival in 2012, dressed in zef style and sporting her signature haircut

Die Antwoord have identified their visual and personal style as zef, a subculture largely inspired by the "trashy" style of post-apartheid working class Afrikaners, "rednecks" and "white trash" of the United States, and gang culture. The term is based on the name of the Ford Zephyr, a car often associated with working class white people in South Africa, and was initially used as a pejorative term for poor white South Africans living in caravan parks. Ninja called it the "underbelly" of "very conservative and stiff" Afrikaner culture and compared it to "apocalyptic debris", while Visser has described it as being "poor but ... fancy" and "sexy". The duo are considered progenitors of the style along with South African rapper Jack Parow.

Vogue's Liana Satenstein likened Ninja's fashion style to that of a "weird dad", describing it as "laze-about, slightly sleazy, and sand-strewn". Visser is also known for her haircut, a bleach blond mullet with short bangs, which she has said inspired Die Antwoord's overall visual direction after Ninja first cut it for her in 2009. Ninja is known for his tattoos, which are inspired by prison tattoos and Cape Flats gang tattoos and are mostly stick and pokes done by South African tattoo artist Tyler B. Murphy. Ninja stated in 2010 that their artistic style is inspired by "the art of children, and the criminally insane" because of a lack of "that hard barrier between their conscious and subconscious minds".

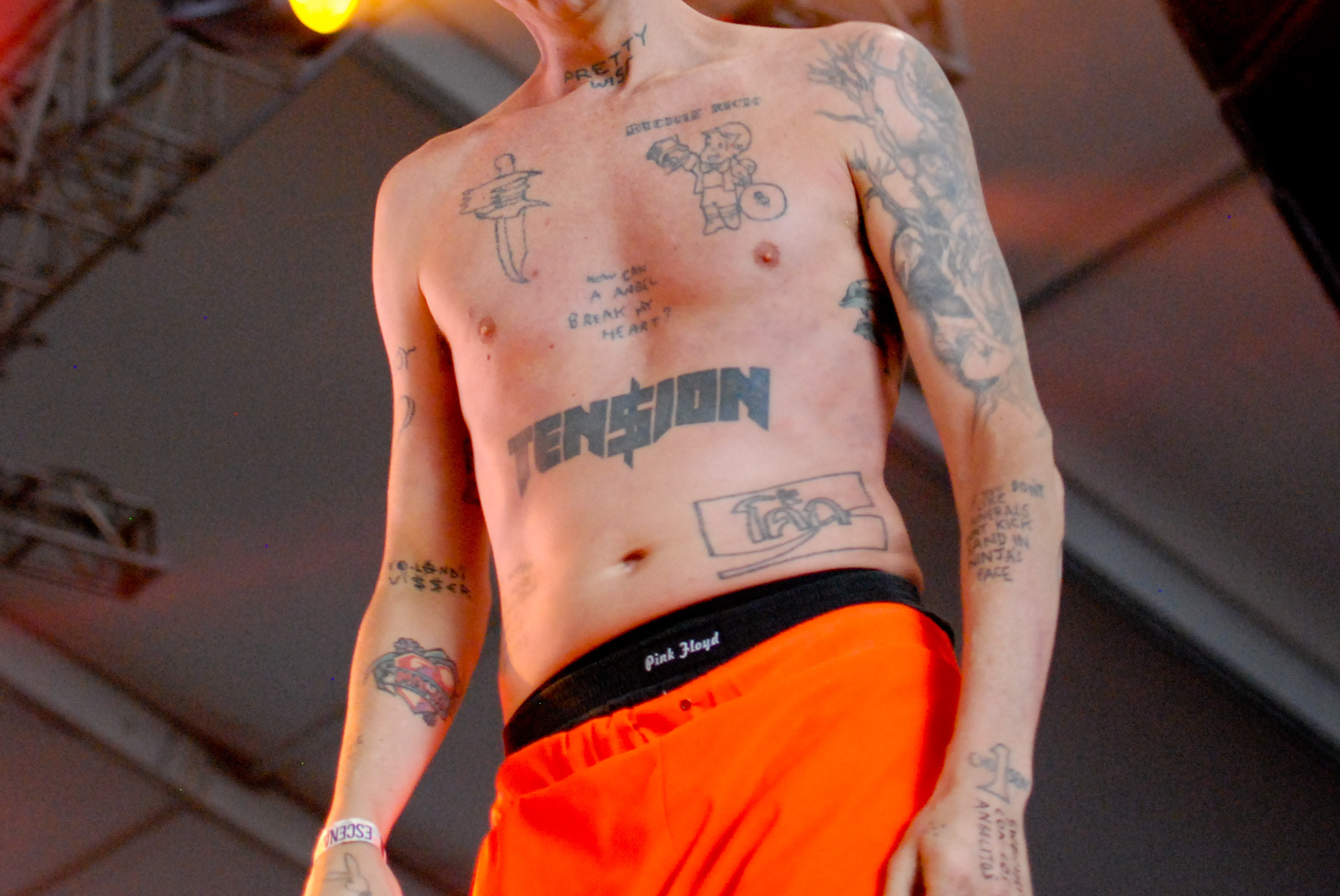
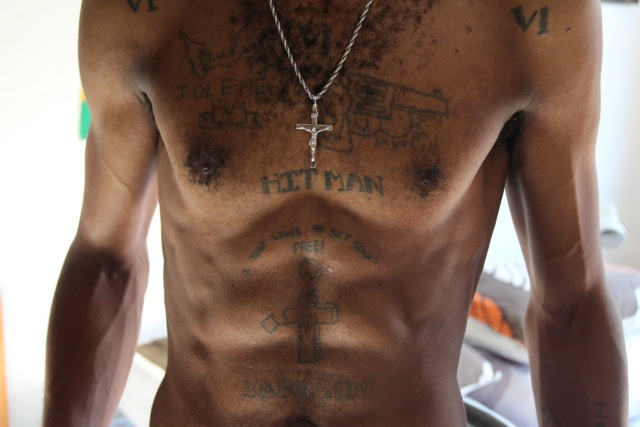
Ninja's tattoos (top, pictured in 2012) are inspired by those borne by members of the Numbers Gang, such as those on the man in the bottom image

They have variously accused others of stealing their style, including in 2015, when they posted a photo of Lady Gaga with a haircut similar to Visser's and called her a "fuktard parasite biter bitch", and in 2016, when Visser accused David Ayer, the director of the 2016 superhero film Suicide Squad, of basing the film's versions of the Joker and Harley Quinn on Ninja and Visser, respectively, and plagiarizing their style of black-and-white graffiti.

Die Antwoord's music videos are known for being absurdist, disturbing, violent, and intentionally shocking, and for often going viral online. News24 dubbed them "SA's [South Africa's] first YouTube megastars" in 2013 and, by early 2015, their videos had cumulatively amassed 200 million views on YouTube. Ninja has described their music videos as "an extension" of their accompanying songs that "[have] to be exactly the same as the song[s], like [they] can kill". Their videos have been compared by critics to horror films. Die Antwoord are also known for their live performances, particularly those at music festivals, which Seth Johnson of The Indianapolis Star called "outrageous" and which Consequence of Sound described as "bombastic" and "frenzied", with the latter publication also writing that they had developed a "live show prestige as a must-see act at any music festival". Dave Pehling of CBS News wrote in 2017 that they had a "growing popularity as a featured festival attraction" and Mark Beaumont of NME also wrote that year that their music "is mostly of secondary concern to the spectacle they build around it".

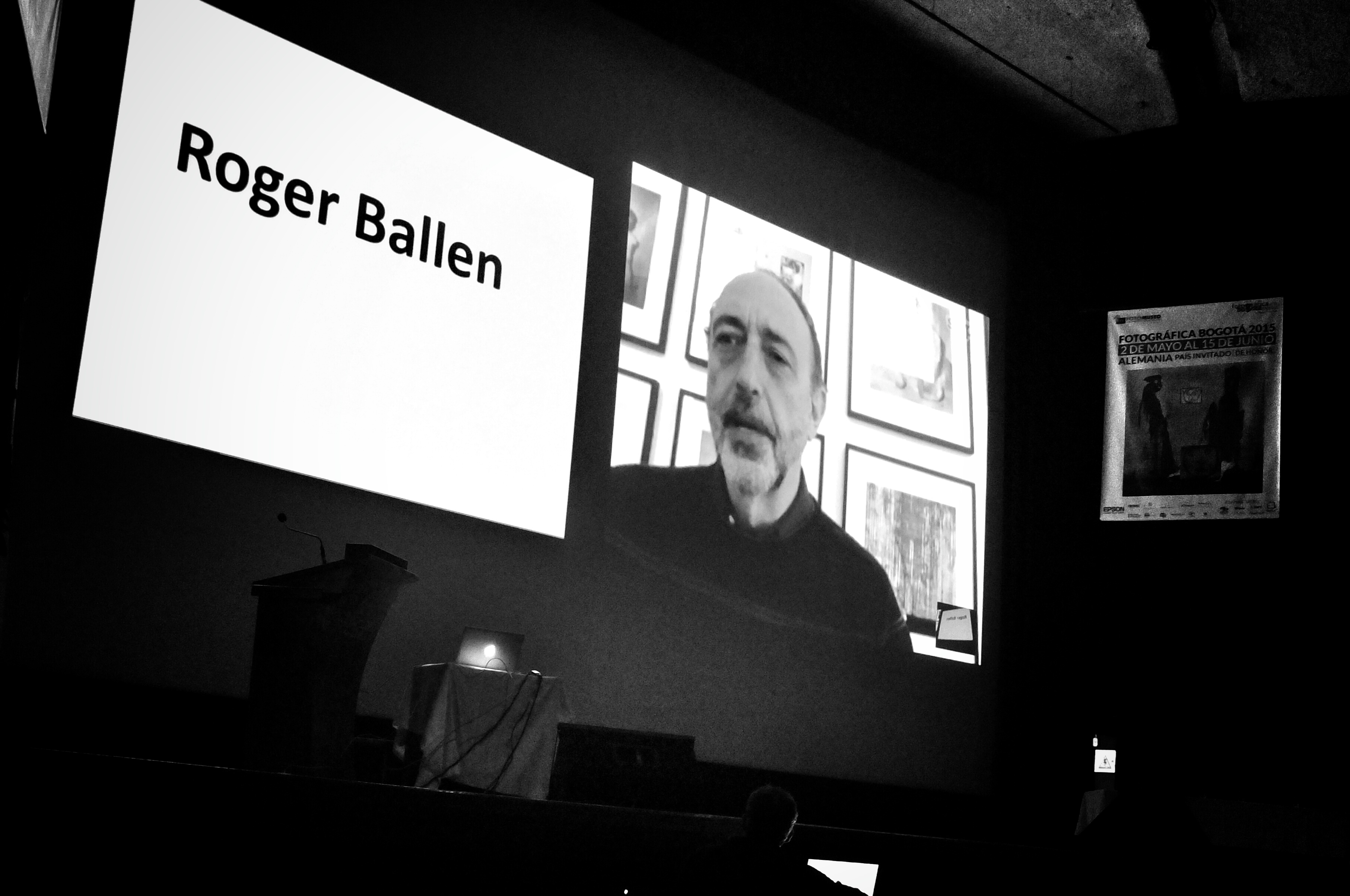
Photographer Roger Ballen (pictured in 2015) was described by Ninja as being "pretty much a member of Die Antwoord", having co-directed their music video for "I Fink U Freeky" and included photos of them in several of his books and exhibits

Roger Ballen is a frequent collaborator of Die Antwoord's, who have said that their artwork is heavily inspired by his photography. Ninja described Ballen as being "pretty much a member of Die Antwoord". They first began incorporating Ballen's work into their visuals starting in 2010 which, following Visser unsuccessfully attempting to get in touch with Ballen in 2005, prompted Ballen to reach out to them to collaborate. According to them, the group was initially drawn to his photography because they related to the "strange, alienated people" from "the fringes of South African society" featured therein. After Ballen co-directed the music video for "I Fink U Freeky" in 2012, he and Die Antwoord released a coffee table book through Prestel Publishing, also titled I Fink U Freeky, in September 2013, which featured photos of the duo taken by Ballen. It was the basis for a 2013 exhibit at Sydney's Stills Gallery of the same title. Photos from the book were also featured in an exhibit of Ballen's work at the National Museum of African Art and photos of them appeared in his book Ballenesque. Ballen also helped to design the set for their music video "Enter the Ninja". Lithographs of Ninja and Visser were featured in artist Anton Kannemeyer's exhibit After the Barbarians, which Die Antwoord helped open at the Jack Shainman Gallery in 2011, and FriendsWithYou, an art duo based in Miami, designed tour visuals for Die Antwoord in 2012.

Die Antwoord is known for their cult following, in particular the unusually prolific creation of fan art by their followers. Interview wrote that they had formed a "rabid fanbase" by 2012.

== Public image ==
=== Authenticity and cultural appropriation accusations ===
Upon their rise to popularity in 2010, critics and audiences, primarily in the United States, frequently questioned whether Die Antwoord were a real group, a joke, or an act of performance art. Vince Mancini of Uproxx described them in 2015 as "everyone's favorite wait-are-they-actually-serious? Afrikaans rap duo" and Andrew Frost of The Guardian called them "models of a knowing kind of authenticity" who posed the questions, "How much of this is real? And how much of this is just play-acting?" In response to the question of if Ninja was a character, Ninja said in 2010 that he was to Jones as "Superman is to Clark Kent" except he never "take[s] off this fokken Superman suit". Visser described their work as "documentary fiction" while Ninja described it as "hyperreality". Ninja later described both his and Visser's stage personas as "hyper, upgraded versions of our old selves".

Since their inception, Die Antwoord's visual aesthetic has been criticized, especially by South African critics, as appropriative of various South African groups, including Coloureds, street gangs from Cape Flats, speakers of Kaaps, and working class white South Africans. Ninja's statements on race have been regarded for often being politically incorrect, including his calling himself "die wit kaffir" (Afrikaans for "the white kaffir") on Die Antwoord's 2012 song "Never le Nkemise". In her 2015 article "Enter the Imperceptible: Reading Die Antwoord", Sonja Smit wrote that Ninja describing himself as a mix of all of South Africa's races and ethnicities was both an avowal of and a challenge to the idea of the country as a "rainbow nation". Following the release of their music video for "Baita Jou Sabela", fellow South African rapper Emile YX? stated, "Die Antwoord's success in South Africa or in the world is to steal or appropriate others' cultural stereotypes and make the most money from it." Dave Beech, for The Line of Best Fit wrote that it was "hard to get behind the idea of them as a real reflection of the South African working class" by 2016.

=== Shock value and controversy ===
Critics have considered Die Antwoord to be polarizing for reliance on shock value and gimmicks since the start of their career. Their music has been referred to by critics as "shock-rap", with the Chicago Tribune writing in 2012 that they were "clearly aiming to offend people". Doug Freeman of the Austin Chronicle wrote of their 2016 performance at Austin City Limits—where, according to him, they were "the most controversial act" to perform at the festival—that they "became less a confrontational force and more a shock joke".

The duo has been criticized in the media for homophobic behavior, particularly for their use of the word "faggot" heard in the lyrics to their song "Fok Julle Naaiers" and written by Visser in a 2015 Instagram post, in which she referred to Canadian rapper Drake as a "massive faggot". They also included the homophobic South African slur "moffie" in the music video for their song "Fok Julle Naaiers" and, in response to a negative review of SOS by South African journalist Chris Roper, included his personal phone number with the words "4 Hot Bum Sex Call". Following the release of "Fok Julle Naaiers", Ninja stated in a 2011 video interview titled "Faggot" that the duo was entitled to use the word as their producer, DJ Hi-Tek, is a gay man, and that they were not homophobic. They have also faced controversy for the repeated appearance of blackface in their music videos, including in "Fatty Boom Boom", "Ugly Boy", and "Banana Brain".

In the aftermath of Butler and Zheani's sexual assault allegations against Ninja, Chelsey Norris of the Dallas Observer wrote in 2019 that they had developed a reputation for "acting like terrible human beings". According to Roper, they were considered pariahs by the South African media by 2020 for their myriad controversies, while Mathilde Boussion wrote that, by 2022, the duo's "disturbing world" was "no longer fascinating".

== Discography ==
- SOS (2009)
- Tension (2012)
- Donker Mag (2014)
- Mount Ninji and da Nice Time Kid (2016)
- House of Zef (2020)
- Zama Zama (2026)

== Members ==
- Ninja – vocals (2008–present)
- Yolandi Visser – vocals (2008–present)
- DJ Hi-Tek – production (2008–present)

== Tours ==
Headlining

- SOS Tour (2010)
- Sonar on Tour (2012)
- Blonde All Over Tour (2013)
- Mount Ninji and Da Nice Time Kid Tour (2016)
- Love Drug World Tour (2017)
- House of Zef Tour (2020, cancelled)
- Reanimated Tour (2024)
- Flame On Muddafucka Tour (2024)
- Zef Winter Wonderland Tour (2024)

Supporting

- Linkin Park – Projekt Revolution (2011)
- Jane's Addiction – 2012 Tour
- Red Hot Chili Peppers – I'm with You World Tour (2013)
