= Zef =

South African slang term

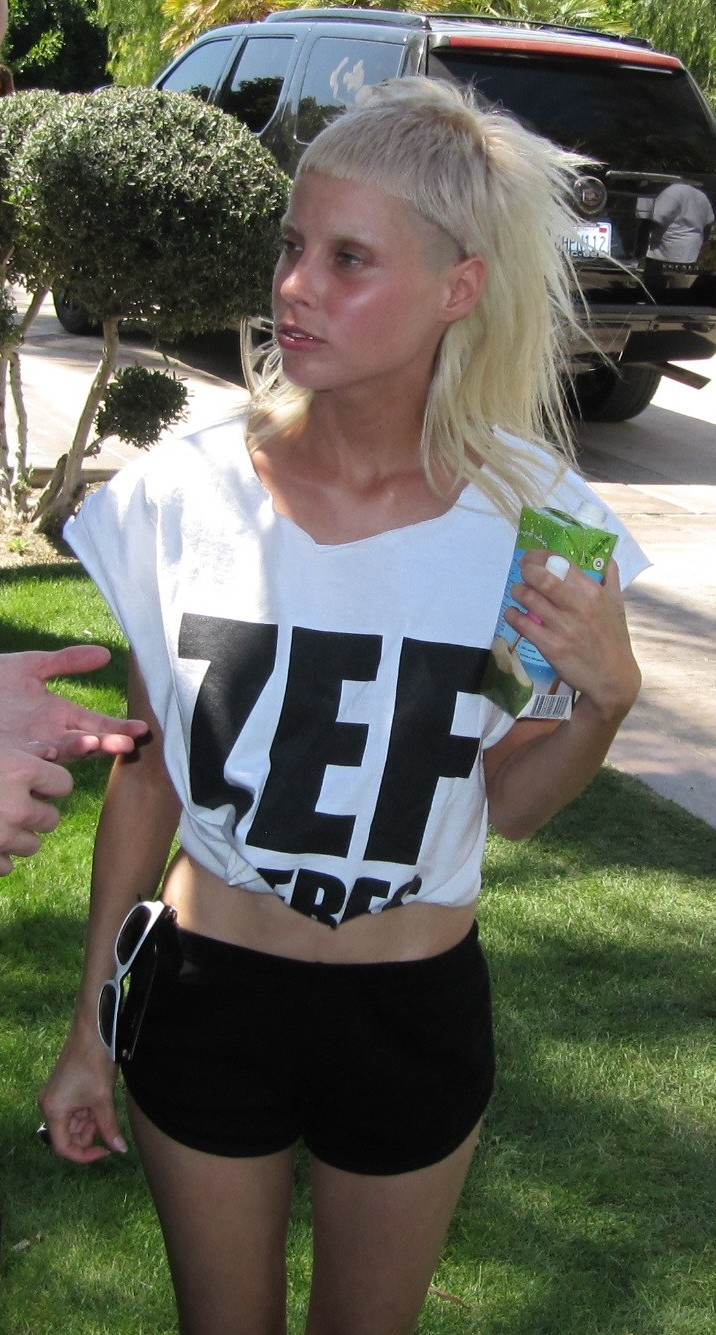
Yolandi Visser wearing a zef T-shirt

Zef (Afrikaans: [ˈzɛf]) is a South African slang term and cultural concept, historically associated with working-class white South Africans, that has been revived and popularized by the music group Die Antwoord.

== Etymology ==
Yolandi Visser of Die Antwoord said, "It's associated with people who soup their cars up and rock gold and shit. Zef is, you're poor but you're fancy. You're poor but you're sexy, you've got style."

The concept of zef originated in the 1960s and 1970s as a derogatory term to refer to working-class whites, including residents of caravan parks. It is a shortening of the name of the Ford Zephyr motorcar that was popular worldwide from the 1950s to the 1970s. In South Africa, these cars were often customized with enhanced engines, tires and wheels. Frikkie Lombard, editor of the Woordeboek van die Afrikaanse Taal, has explained zef as "something which is usually considered to be common, but nowadays has credibility." The term also appears in Werner Herzog's memoir Of Walking in Ice of 1978.

== Zef music and culture ==
The music group Die Antwoord self-identifies as zef in style. In a 2010 interview, Ninja of Die Antwoord responded to the controversy arising from his claim that zef represented South Africa. Critics suggested it might rather just represent (Afrikaans) white South Africa. He commented that "racism is somewhat obsolete and a thing of the past for South Africans." In the same interview, Ninja says zef is a style of music and a style of subculture, comparing it to hip-hop in its role in society. In a featurette for Die Antwoord's role in the film Chappie, Ninja states that zef means "that you literally don't care what anyone else thinks of you; like, you represent yourself in your music, in how you dress, in how you think, how you speak."

In 2013, a "satirical blog" originally titled Zef Kinners briefly became a viral success in South Africa (and then faced legal claims) after it was started as a student school project, posting photos of people the blog considered to exemplify zef. The blog's creator commented, "Jack Parow and Die Antwoord are not zef. That's the safe version of zef. Zef has a dirty face."

Authors Ross Truscott and Maria Brock have perceived the "rise of zef culture" to be an expression of "Afrikaner self-parody" growing out of a sense of "national melancholia" in post-apartheid South Africa. They note similarities to earlier touchstones of South African culture such as the anti-apartheid Voëlvry Movement, the satirical magazine Bitterkomix, and the alternative rock band Fokofpolisiekar. Similarly, playwright/academic Anton Krueger has posited that the "embrace of the vulgarity embodied by Zef" is in part an "outlet" for a post-apartheid "sense of shame".

Other performers who have been identified as exponents of zef include Voëlvry leader Koos Kombuis, comic performers Corné and Twakkie (Louw Venter and Rob van Vuuren) of The Most Amazing Show, and the comedy group Zef Sketse, known for their 2006 TV series Kompleks.
