= Donker Mag =

Studio album by Die Antwoord
- Released: 3 June 2014
- Recorded: 2012–14
- Length: 49:51
- Label: Zef AWAL
- Producer: DJ Hi-Tek; DJ Muggs

Die Antwoord chronology
Ten$Ion (2012)	Donker Mag (2014)	Suck on This (2016)

Die Antwoord studio album chronology
Ten$ion (2012)	Donker Mag (2014)	Mount Ninji and da Nice Time Kid (2016)

Singles from Donker Mag
- 1. "Cookie Thumper!" Released: 18 June 2013; 2. "Pitbull Terrier" Released: 20 May 2014; 3. "Ugly Boy" Released: 4 November 2014

Professional ratings
Aggregate scores
Source	Rating
Metacritic	61/100
Review scores
Source	Rating
AllMusic	4/5 stars
The A.V. Club	B−
Consequence of Sound	negative
Rolling Stone	2.5/5 stars

Donker Mag (Afrikaans for 'Dark Power') is the third studio album by South African hip hop and rave group Die Antwoord. It was released on 3 June 2014 by Zef Records.

== Singles ==
The album's lead single "Cookie Thumper!" was released on 18 June 2013. A music video for the second single "Pitbull Terrier" was released on 20 May 2014. A music video for "Ugly Boy" was released on 4 November 2014. Directed by Ninja, this video, rich in cameos, features English model Cara Delevingne, Marilyn Manson, Red Hot Chili Peppers bassist Flea, Jack Black, burlesque dancer Dita Von Teese, the ATL twins (Sewell Brothers), Aphex Twin (the producer of the remixed original song), some group members, Sixteen Jones (the daughter of Ninja and Yolandi), and others.

== Track listing ==
No.	Title	Length
1.	"Don't Fuk Me"	0:28
2.	"Ugly Boy"	3:33
3.	"Happy Go Sucky Fucky"	4:11
4.	"Zars"	1:05
5.	"Raging Zef Boner"	3:19
6.	"Pompie"	1:16
7.	"Cookie Thumper!"	3:20
8.	"Girl I Want 2 Eat U"	4:04
9.	"Pitbull Terrier"	3:40
10.	"Strunk"	4:30
11.	"Do Not Fuk wif da Kid"	1:03
12.	"Rat Trap 666" (featuring DJ Muggs)	5:44
13.	"I Don't Dwank"	3:25
14.	"Sex"	4:36
15.	"Moon Love"	2:17
16.	"Donker Mag"	3:20
Total length:		49:51

Notes

- "Don't Fuk Me" quotes the movie Scarface, where Ninja's monologue came from.
- "Ugly Boy" features heavily a sample from the song "Ageispolis" by Aphex Twin.
- "Happy Go Sucky Fucky" is based on the song "Expander" from the game Streets of Rage 2, scored by Yuzo Koshiro and Motohiro Kawashima.
- "Raging Zef Boner" has a fake advertisement at the end, which features a quote from Lord of the Rings, in which Gandalf asks Frodo to keep the Ring secret and safe pending his return.
- "Girl I Want 2 Eat U" quotes the dub of Azumanga Daioh, where Yolandi's monologue at the end of the song came from.
- "Pitbull Terrier" is based on the song "Pit Bull" by Emir Kusturica and the No Smoking Orchestra from the Black Cat, White Cat soundtrack.
- "Moon Love" is from the album Good Morning South Africa by MaxNormal.TV, Ninja and Yolandi's earlier hip-hop group, and features their daughter, Sixteen Jones, as a toddler.
- "Sex" is based on the song "Sea, Sex and Sun" by Serge Gainsbourg.

== Charts ==
=== Weekly charts ===
Chart (2014)	Peak position
Australian Albums (ARIA)	11
Belgian Albums (Ultratop Flanders)	26
Belgian Albums (Ultratop Wallonia)	53
Canadian Albums (Billboard)	15
Dutch Albums (Album Top 100)	49
French Albums (SNEP)	193
German Albums (Offizielle Top 100)	95
New Zealand Albums (RMNZ)	32
Swiss Albums (Schweizer Hitparade)	71
UK Albums (OCC)	103
UK Independent Albums (OCC)	18
UK R&B Albums (OCC)	8
US Billboard 200	37
US Top Dance Albums (Billboard)	1
US Independent Albums (Billboard)	4
US Top Rap Albums (Billboard)	5

=== Year-end charts ===
Chart (2014)	Position
Belgian Albums (Ultratop Flanders)	189
