= Hamba kahle Mkhonto =

South African anti-apartheid song

"Hamba kahle Mkhonto" (English, "Go safely Spear") is a Xhosa language South African revolutionary song used formerly by members of uMkhonto weSizwe (MK), the military wing of the African National Congress during the Apartheid era in South Africa. The song was traditionally used at the funerals of the members of the MK.. It was sung at the funeral of the former MK Chief of Staff Chris Hani, in 1993. In the post-Apartheid era, it is still sung at the funerals of MK veterans. Most notably, at the funeral of Nelson Mandela, with a modified version emphasizing reconciliation.

== Lyrics ==
Xhosa	English
Hamba! Hamba kahle Mkhonto; Wee Mkhonto; Mkhonto weSizwe; Thina bantu boMkhonto sizimisele Ukuwabulala wona lamaBhulu	Go! Go safely Spear; Spear! Spear of the Nation; We, the soldiers of the Spear of the Nation; Have dedicated ourselves to killing the Boers

Critics of the song interpret it as calling for Black South Africans to kill White people, particularly Afrikaners. The song received renewed attention in the 21st century when footage of Nelson Mandela from the 1990s singing it at the funeral of an ANC member emerged

The version sung at Nelson Mandela's funeral changes the lyrics to Hamba kahle Mkhonto Wesizwe, thina bafana bomkhonto sizimisele ukubuyisana nawo lamabhunu (English, “Go well comrade, we MK soldiers are determined to reconcile with the Boers”.)

== See also ==
Umshini wami
