= Ten$ion =

Studio album by Die Antwoord
- Released: 29 January 2012
- Recorded: 2010–2012
- Length: 38:46
- Label: Zef Recordz

Die Antwoord chronology
| Ekstra (2010) | Ten$ion (2012) | Donker Mag (2014) |

Die Antwoord studio album chronology
| $O$ (2010) | Ten$ion (2012) | Donker Mag (2014) |

Singles from Ten$ion
- 1. "Fok Julle Naaiers" Released: 17 October 2011; 2. "I Fink U Freeky" Released: 29 January 2012; 3. "Baby's on Fire" Released: 5 June 2012; 4. "Fatty Boom Boom" Released: 16 October 2012

Ten$ion is the second studio album by South African hip-hop/rave group Die Antwoord. The album was released on the iTunes Store on 29 January 2012 and on CD on 7 February. The album was released on Die Antwoord's label Zef Recordz after leaving their previous label Interscope due to pressure on Die Antwoord to become "more generic". The album debuted at number 20 on the Billboard Dance/Electronic Albums chart.

== Promotion ==
A trailer for the album was released 22 January 2012 featuring "I Fink U Freeky". The group also appears in both a video and print ads for Alexander Wang fashion line "T" for Spring 2012. The ad features the song "Fatty Boom Boom". The group also had a performance spot on the American television show Late Show with David Letterman, in which they performed "I Fink U Freeky." Letterman, apparently amused by the song, would randomly drop the phrase "I think you're freaky and I like you a lot" into his monologues for weeks afterward. They performed the same song on another US late night TV show Jimmy Kimmel Live!.

== Music videos ==
"Fok Julle Naaiers" (English: "Fuck You Motherfuckers") was released as a music video on Vimeo on 7 November 2011. "I Fink U Freeky" was also released as a music video on 31 January 2012, featuring the appearance of Watkin Tudor Jones (Ninja)'s cousin, Marthinus Thomas Jacobus Van Tonder. On 5 June 2012, a video for "Baby's on Fire" was released. Although a single wasn't released for "Fatty Boom Boom", on 16 October 2012 a video for the song was released. It lampoons Lady Gaga in response to her offer to have Die Antwoord be the opening act on her tour.

== Critical reception ==
Professional ratings
Aggregate scores
| Source | Rating |
|---|---|
| Metacritic | (57/100) |
Review scores
| Source | Rating |
| AllMusic | 3.5/5 stars |
| The Guardian | 3/5 stars |
| One Thirty BPM | (75%) |
| No Ripcord | (7/10) |
| Blare | 2.5/5 stars |
| Pitchfork | (4.2/10) |
| Rolling Stone | 2/5 stars |
| The Phoenix | 2.5/4 stars |
| PopMatters | 6/10 stars |
| Tiny Mix Tapes | 2.5/5 stars |

The album has a score of 57 out of 100 on Metacritic, indicating mixed or average reviews. Pitchfork's Andrew Ryce called it "id rap at its worst" and that "even their excess lacks scope or imagination" concluding with "For a band so obsessed with its own self-consciously humorous image, Ten$ion in part fails because it feels so strangely humorless" and that they "picked the most unfortunate parts of their oversized, manufactured personalities to highlight". Monica Herrera of Rolling Stone cited the album as "a marathon of overwrought beats and clunky horn-dog-rebel boasts" going on to say Jimmy Iovine who signed the band to Interscope was "on to sounder investments these days." Joshua Khan of Blare stated the album had "more confidence" than $O$ but it was "forced, coming off senseless and providing some sort of proof their fire might finally be cooling off."

Allison Stewart of The Washington Post noted the album's "simplest songs" were "hopelessly complex" while saying the album was "better than it needs to be, but not as good as it thinks it is" but that the album is "peppered with great moments".

== Track listing ==
| No. | Title | Writer(s) | Length |
|---|---|---|---|
| 1. | "Never Le Nkemise 1" | Watkin Tudor Jones; DJ Hi-Tek | 2:52 |
| 2. | "I Fink U Freeky" | Yolandi Visser; Lily Roberts; DJ Hi-Tek; Jones | 4:40 |
| 3. | "Pielie" (skit, featuring Ninja) | Leon Du Toit | 0:09 |
| 4. | "Hey Sexy" | Visser; DJ Hi-Tek; Jones | 5:08 |
| 5. | "Fatty Boom Boom" | DJ Hi-Tek; Visser; Jones | 3:45 |
| 6. | "Zefside Zol" (interlude) | DJ Hi-Tek; Jones | 0:56 |
| 7. | "So What?" | Visser; DJ Hi-Tek; Jones | 3:51 |
| 8. | "Uncle Jimmy" (skit) | Uncle Jimmy; DJ Hi-Tek; Visser | 1:21 |
| 9. | "Baby's on Fire" | Jones; DJ Hi-Tek; Visser | 3:56 |
| 10. | "U Make a Ninja Wanna Fuck" | Jones | 3:16 |
| 11. | "Fok Julle Naaiers" | Jones; DJ Hi-Tek; Visser | 3:54 |
| 12. | "DJ Hi-Tek Rulez" | DJ Hi-Tek | 1:37 |
| 13. | "Never Le Nkemise 2" | Jones; Visser; DJ Hi-Tek | 3:21 |
| Total length: | | | 38:46 |

=== Sample credits ===
- "Never Le Nkemise 1" contains an interpolation of "Unbelievable" by EMF.
- "Hey Sexy" is based on "Ziwzih Ziwzih OO-OO-OO" (1968) by Delia Derbyshire. It contains an interpolation of "America, Fuck Yeah" by Trey Parker and Matt Stone as well as "Move Bitch" by Ludacris and Justin Bieber's "Baby" also featuring Ludacris.
- The lyrics of "DJ Hi-Tek Rulez" are taken from a tirade delivered by Mike Tyson towards a reporter in 2002.
- "U Make a Ninja Wanna Fuck" contains a slight interpolation of Tiffany's rendition of "I Think We're Alone Now".

== Charts ==
| Chart | Peak position |
|---|---|
| Australian Albums Chart | 38 |
| Belgian Albums Chart (Flanders) | 40 |
| Belgian Albums Chart (Wallonia) | 156 |
| Canadian Albums Chart | 73 |
| Dutch Albums Chart | 87 |
| Swiss Albums Chart | 100 |
| U.S. Billboard 200 | 143 |
| U.S. Billboard Dance/Electronic Albums | 8 |
| U.S. Billboard Heatseekers Albums | 2 |
| U.S. Billboard Independent Albums | 20 |
| U.S. Billboard Rap Albums | 12 |

== Release history ==
| Region | Date | Format(s) | Label |
|---|---|---|---|
| United States | 29 January 2012 | Digital | Zef Recordz |
| United States | 7 February 2012 | CD | Zef Recordz |
