= Watkin Tudor Jones =

South African rapper (born 1974)

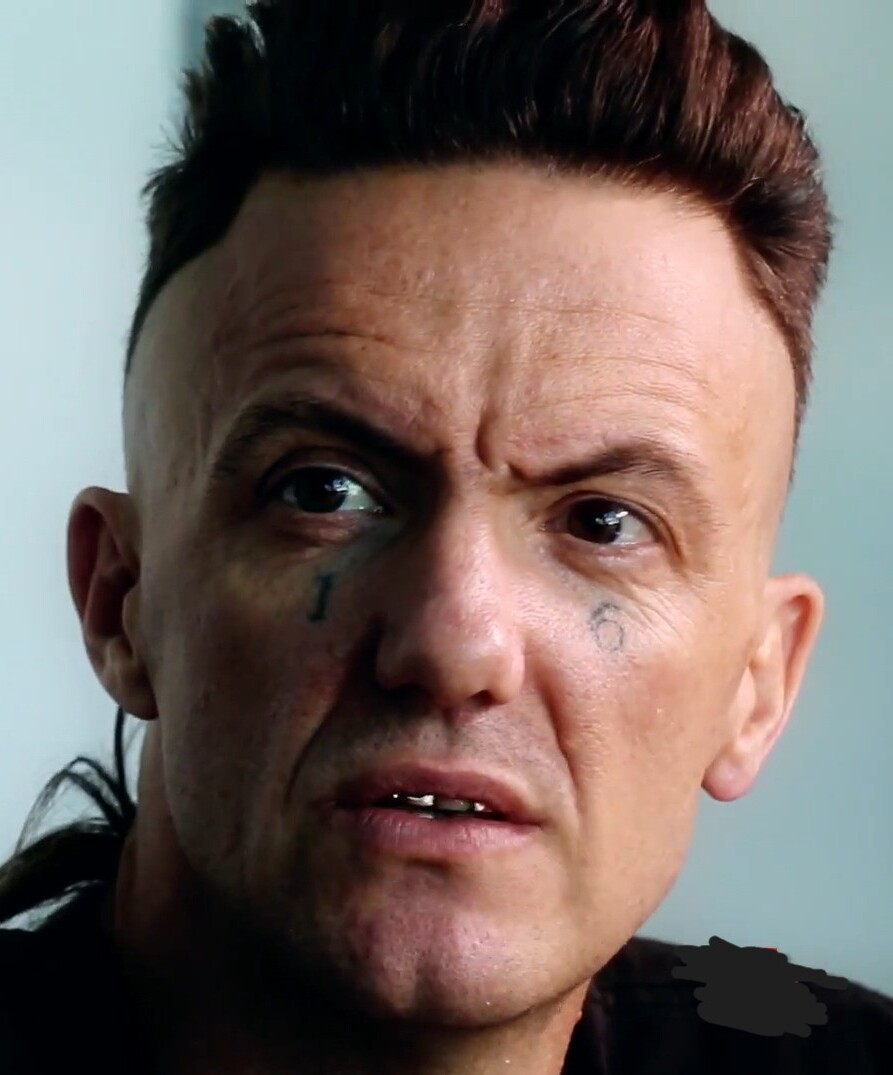
- Jones in 2015

Background information
- Also known as: Ninja; Max Normal; The Man Who Never Came Back; MC Totally Rad; Yang Weapon; Destructo; Waddy; WAD:e; Ninjie
- Born: 26 September 1974 (age 52); Johannesburg, Transvaal, (Note: Now Gauteng) South Africa
- Genres: Alternative hip hop; techno
- Occupations: Rapper; singer; songwriter; record producer; actor; music video director
- Years active: 1993–present
- Labels: Interscope; Cherrytree; Polydor; Rhythm; Zef Recordz

Watkin Tudor Jones (born 26 September 1974), better known by his stage names Ninja and Max Normal, is a South African rapper, singer-songwriter, record producer, and actor. Tudor Jones found international success as a member of the zef hip hop duo Die Antwoord, with Yolandi Visser (born Anri du Toit). He was formerly a member of Max Normal and The Constructus Corporation.

Tudor Jones also has had a number of acting roles, including a self-styled role as Ninja in the 2015 Neill Blomkamp film Chappie.

== Early life ==
Watkin Tudor Jones was born on 26 September 1974 in Johannesburg, Transvaal Province, now Gauteng, South Africa. He attended Parktown Boys' High School where he met his The Original Evergreen band members. Tudor Jones frequented nightclubs where he developed his skills as a rapper.

== Career ==
=== 1993–1999: The Original Evergreen ===
Tudor Jones was part of the South African rap band The Original Evergreen, which was signed to Sony Music. He released one single with the group, "Puff the Magik", which was banned from radio for its controversial lyrics about marijuana usage. In 1996, after the track would later win a SAMA music award for Best Rap Album award, he left to release a solo album under Chameleon Records and later form Max Normal. The band released Burn the Evidence in 1997, which caused more notoriety in the South African music scene. In 1998, the band resurfaced in Cape Town with a new lineup featuring Brendon le Roux (vocals), Sebastian Voigt (bass, programming), Richard Bruyns (guitar), Stephen Trollip (saxophone), Phat Jack (turntables), Tasha Baxter (vocals) and Sven Mc Alpine (drums), and played extensively in Cape Town and Johannesburg while working on a new album titled Addictive Personalities, produced by Warrick Sony (Kalahari Surfers) and featuring a guest appearance by Arno Carstens (Springbok Nude Girls). The album was to be released on the Sheer Sound label. Still, it caused such uproar in the South African press due to the contents of its lyrics that Sheer Sound was forced to withdraw it and was the final chapter in The Original Evergreen story as it resulted in the band splitting up. The album Addictive Personalities was released in a limited run by Melt 2000 in 1999.

=== 2001–2002: Memoirs of a Clone and Max Normal ===
In 2001, Tudor Jones released his debut solo album Memoirs of a Clone.Produced by Adrian Levi and Waddy Jones. Memoirs of a clone was Produced by Waddy Jones and Adrian levi and released through Chameleon Records. At the time, he was the lead vocalist of Max Normal, a hip hop act, which released their debut album entitled Songs From The Mall in 2001, which he disbanded in 2002. Their last gig was played with Faithless on the group's 2002 South Africa tour.

=== 2002–2003: The Constructus Corporation ===
When Tudor Jones disbanded Max Normal in early 2002, he and musician Sibot invited Markus Wormstorm and Felix Laband to collaborate on The Constructus Corporation project, which resulted in the concept album and graphic novel The Ziggurat, released on 3 June 2002.

Tudor Jones asked Anri du Toit, better known as his Die Antwoord bandmate Yolandi Visser to lend vocals for the project. She was credited as Anica the Snuffling.

The Constructus Corporation disbanded in 2003.

=== 2005: The Fantastic Kill ===
In 2005, Tudor Jones released his second solo album The Fantastic Kill. It was released in France in 2007 as MC Totally Rad And DJ Fuck Are Fucknrad under the name Fucknrad.

=== 2007–2008: MaxNormal.TV ===
In 2007, Tudor Jones resurrected and revamped Max Normal as the 'corporate' hip-hop group "MaxNormal.TV".

The new lineup consisted of Watkin Tudor Jones revising as Max Normal, and Anri du Toit as Yolandi Visser. The band also featured Neon Don playing various recurring characters and Justin De Nobrega making instrumentals.

The group released its debut and only album Good Morning South Africa in 2008. A DVD featuring 13 skits, music videos and short films was released in the same year, titled Goeie More Zuid Afrika.

=== 2008–current: Die Antwoord ===
Tudor Jones is currently a member of the South African rap-rave group Die Antwoord. The group was formed by Tudor Jones as Ninja, Anri du Toit as Yolandi Visser, and producer Justin De Nobrega as HITEK5000 (formerly referred to as DJ Hi-Tek and God). They have since added a second producer, Lil2Hood. Die Antwoord is part of the South African counterculture movement known as zef.

The band released its debut album $O$ in 2009. It was made freely available online and attracted international attention for their music video "Enter the Ninja". They briefly signed with Interscope Records, and left after pressure from the label to be more generic. du Toit explained that Interscope "kept pushing us to be more generic" to make more money: "If you try to make songs that other people like, your band will always be shit. You always gotta do what you like. If it connects, it's a miracle, but it happened with Die Antwoord.". They formed their own independent label, Zef Recordz and released their second album Ten$ion through it.

They have since released three other albums: Donker Mag in 2014, Mount Ninji and da Nice Time Kid in 2016, and House of Zef in 2020. As well as this, Tudor Jones played a self-styled role as Ninja in the 2015 Neill Blomkamp film Chappie.

== Personal life ==
Tudor Jones has a daughter named Sixteen (b. 2005) with Yolandi Visser. Tudor Jones and Visser also have adopted or fostered three children.

In 2019, a video from 2012 surfaced, showing Tudor Jones and Visser fighting and hurling homophobic slurs against Andy Butler, founder of the American dance project Hercules and Love Affair. Both Tudor Jones and Visser later said the person who filmed the video edited it to make it seem like they were in the wrong.

=== Allegations of abuse ===
In May 2022, one of Visser and Ninja's adoptive sons appeared in a 45-minute-long video interview published by the South African news organization News24, in which he described his childhood growing up with them. He stated that the duo adopted him "to be a slave"; exposed him to drugs, gang activity, pornography, and weapons; convinced him that he was "the king of hell"; encouraged violent behavior between him and his brother; told him to mock his biological family for being poor as they recorded it; abandoned him with an au pair for two years in Johannesburg while they lived in Los Angeles; and sexualized his older adoptive sister. He added that he had cut off all contact with them two years prior to the interview. Die Antwoord denied the claims and called them fabrications in a statement posted to their website. The au pair and Die Antwoord's photographer Ben Jay Crossman, who described Die Antwoord as "violent people" whom he "want[ed] nothing to do with", both corroborated the duo exposing the adoptive son to drugs, violence, and sex.

== Discography ==
=== The Original Evergreen ===
- Puff the Magik (1995)
- Burn the Evidence (1997)
- Addictive Personalities (1999)

=== Max Normal ===
- Songs from the Mall (2001)

=== The Constructus Corporation ===
- The Ziggurat (2003)

=== MaxNormal.TV ===
- Rap Made Easy (2007)
- Good Morning South Africa (2008)

=== Die Antwoord ===
- $O$ (2009)
- Ten$ion (2012)
- Donker Mag (2014)
- Mount Ninji and da Nice Time Kid (2016)
- House of Zef (2020)
- Zama Zama (2026)

=== Solo ===
- Memoirs of a Clone (2001)
- The Fantastic Kill (2005) (released in 2007 in France as MC Totally Rad And DJ Fuck are Fucknrad)

== Filmography ==
- Goeie More Zuid Africa DVD (2008)
- Tokoloshe (2011)
- Umshimi Wam (2011)
- Chappie (2015) – features "Baby's on Fire", "Ugly Boy", "Cookie Thumper" and "Enter the Ninja".
- ZEF: The Story of Die Antwoord (2024)
