= Suck on This (mixtape) =

Mixtape by Die Antwoord
- Released: 19 May 2016
- Length: 35:22
- Label: Zef

Die Antwoord chronology
Donker Mag (2014)	Suck on This (2016)	Mount Ninji and da Nice Time Kid (2016)

Singles from Suck on This
- 1. "Dazed & Confused" Released: 16 May 2016; 2. "Bum Bum" Released: 16 May 2016; 3. "Pitbull Terrier (God's Berzerker Trap Remix)" Released: 17 May 2016; 4. "Gucci Coochie" Released: 18 May 2016

Suck on This is a mixtape by Die Antwoord. It was released on 19 May 2016 as a free digital download. The mixtape serves as a precursor to the band's fourth album, Mount Ninji and da Nice Time Kid.

== Track listing ==
No.	Title	Length
1.	"Dance wif da Devil" (featuring The Black Goat)	1:37
2.	"Bum Bum" (featuring God)	3:19
3.	"Gucci Coochie" (featuring Dita Von Teese, The Black Goat & God)	3:57
4.	"Where's My Fukn Cup Cake?" (featuring The Black Goat)	0:33
5.	"Dazed & Confused" (featuring God)	2:41
6.	"Siembamba" (featuring The Black Goat)	0:36
7.	"Pitbull Terrier" (God's Berzerker Trap Remix)	3:51
8.	"I Fink U Freeky" (God's Death Trap Remix)	3:17
9.	"We Want Candy" (featuring The Black Goat)	0:28
10.	"Fok Julle Naaiers" (God's Wicked Jungle Remix)	2:39
11.	"I Don't Care" (featuring God)	2:18
12.	"Jan Pierewiet" (featuring The Black Goat)	1:30
13.	"Enter da Ninja" (The Black Goat Decapitator Remix)	4:59
Total length:		35:22

== Charts ==
Chart (2016)	Peak position
Belgian Albums (Ultratop Flanders)	143
