= Yolandi Visser =

South African singer and rapper (born 1984)

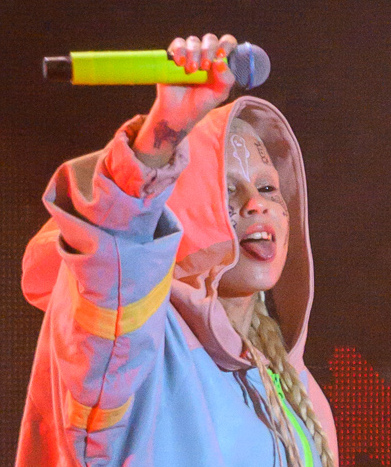
- Visser performing with Die Antwoord in 2019

Background information
- Also known as: Anica the Snuffling
- Born: Anri du Toit; 3 March 1984 (age 42); Port Alfred, Eastern Cape, South Africa
- Genres: Alternative hip-hop; techno
- Occupations: Rapper; singer; songwriter
- Years active: 2002–present
- Labels: Interscope; Cherrytree; Polydor; Rhythm; Zef Recordz
- Formerly of: MaxNormal.TV; The Constructus Corporation; Die Antwoord

Anri du Toit (born 3 March 1984), known professionally as Yolandi Visser (stylised as ¥o-Landi Vi$$er), is a South African singer, rapper, and songwriter. She is one of two vocalists in the alternative hip hop group Die Antwoord, along with Watkin Tudor Jones (known as Ninja).

Visser appeared in the 2015 Neill Blomkamp film Chappie.

== Early life ==
Anri du Toit was born on 3 March 1984 in Port Alfred, Eastern Cape, South Africa. She was adopted by clergyman Reverend Ben du Toit, who worked as the director of communications for the Dutch Reformed Church in South Africa in 2012, and his wife, and had an adoptive older brother, Leon (d. 2015). Growing up, she has said she felt like she did not fit in or belong anywhere, and describes herself as 'a little punk' who frequently got into fistfights, and listened to the music of Nirvana, PJ Harvey, Nine Inch Nails, Cypress Hill, Eminem, Marilyn Manson and Aphex Twin. At the age of 16, du Toit was sent to Pretoria to attend a boarding school which was nine hours away from her family's home. Du Toit said that she blossomed among other creative and artistic-minded people while there.

== Career ==
=== The Constructus Corporation ===
Du Toit was asked by Watkin Tudor Jones (aka "Ninja") to lend vocals for his project The Constructus Corporation. She was credited as Anica the Snuffling. The band released their debut and only album The Ziggurat in 2003.

=== MaxNormal.TV ===
Du Toit was a member of the South African 'corporate' hip-hop group MaxNormal.TV, in which she played the role of Max Normal's personal assistant. In MaxNormal.TV, she went by the stage name Yolandi Visser.

In the song "Tik Tik Tik", du Toit's fictional backstory is detailed. The song claims that she was born into poverty in a large family, and eventually ran away out of boredom and loneliness. In "Option A", she meets a drug dealer, and eventually begins working for him, transporting drugs in exchange for food and money. She becomes addicted to meth, and regrets her choices. In "Option B", she ignores the drug dealer when he tried to talk to her, and instead begins working at a cafe, and rents a room there. She then is offered to join MaxNormal.TV after watching a rap show outside the cafe.

The group released their debut and only album Good Morning South Africa in 2008. A DVD featuring 13 skits, music videos and short films was released in the same year, titled Goeie Morge Zuid Afrika.

=== Die Antwoord ===
Du Toit is currently a member of the South African rap-rave group Die Antwoord. The group was formed by du Toit, her then-partner Tudor Jones, and producer HITEK5000 (formerly referred to as DJ Hi-Tek). They have since added a second producer Lil2Hood.

Die Antwoord is part of the South African counterculture movement known as zef. For the band, du Toit goes by the stage name ¥o-Landi Vi$$er. She styled her hair into a bleach-blonde mullet at the start of the band, which was originally done to have an edge. She has said cutting her hair felt like a birth, and a statement of outsider and zef pride.

The band released their debut album $O$ in 2009. It was made freely available online and attracted international attention for their music video "Enter the Ninja". They briefly signed with Interscope Records, and left after pressure from the label to be more generic. du Toit explained that Interscope "kept pushing us to be more generic" in order to make more money: "If you try to make songs that other people like, your band will always be shit. You always gotta do what you like. If it connects, it's a miracle, but it happened with Die Antwoord." They formed their own independent label, Zef Recordz and released their second album Tension through it.

They have since released three other albums: Donker Mag in 2014, Mount Ninji and da Nice Time Kid in 2016, and House of Zef in 2020. As well as this, du Toit played a self-styled role as ¥o-Landi Vi$$er in the 2015 Neill Blomkamp film Chappie.

== Personal life ==
Du Toit has a daughter named Sixteen (b. 2005) with Watkin Tudor Jones. Du Toit and Tudor Jones also adopted or fostered three children.

In 2019, a video from 2012 surfaced, showing Tudor Jones and Visser fighting and hurling homophobic slurs against Andy Butler, founder of the American dance project Hercules and Love Affair. Tudor Jones claimed that the person who filmed the video edited it to make it seem like they were in the wrong.

=== Allegations of abuse ===
In May 2022, one of Visser and Ninja's adoptive sons appeared in a 45-minute-long video interview published by the South African news organization News24, in which he described his childhood growing up with them. He stated that the duo adopted him "to be a slave"; exposed him to drugs, gang activity, pornography, and weapons; convinced him that he was "the king of hell"; encouraged violent behavior between him and his brother; told him to mock his biological family for being poor as they recorded it; abandoned him with an au pair for two years in Johannesburg while they lived in Los Angeles; and sexualized his older adoptive sister. He added that he had cut off all contact with them two years prior to the interview. Die Antwoord denied the claims and called them fabrications in a statement posted to their website. The son's au pair, and Die Antwoord's photographer Ben Jay Crossman — who described Die Antwoord as "violent people" whom he "want[ed] nothing to do with"— both corroborated the duo exposing the adoptive son to drugs, violence, and sex.

== Discography ==
=== The Constructus Corporation ===
- The Ziggurat (2003)

=== MaxNormal.TV ===
- Rap Made Easy (2007)
- Good Morning South Africa (2008)

=== Die Antwoord ===
- $O$ (2009)
- Ten$ion (2012)
- Donker Mag (2014)
- Mount Ninji and da Nice Time Kid (2016)
- House of Zef (2020)
- Zama Zama (2026)

== Filmography ==
- Goeie More Zuid Africa DVD (2008)
- Tokoloshe (2011)
- Umshimi Wam (2011)
- Chappie (2015) – features "Baby's On Fire", "Ugly Boy", "Cookie Thumper" and "Enter the Ninja".
- ZEF: The Story of Die Antwoord (2024)
- ZAMA ZAMA: Season One (July, 2026)
