= The Constructus Corporation =

Former South African musical group

- left to right: Simon Ringrose, Yolandi Visser, Watkin Tudor Jones, Markus Wormstorm

Background information
- Also known as: Constructus
- Origin: Cape Town, South Africa
- Genres: Hip hop; electronic; trip hop
- Years active: 2002–2003
- Label: African Dope Records
- Past members: Watkin Tudor Jones; Felix Laband; Markus Wormstorm; Simon Ringrose; Anica the Snuffling

The Constructus Corporation were a South African electronic music group.

== Formation of the band ==
Following the breakup of Watkin Tudor Jones' project Max Normal in 2002, Jones moved from Johannesburg to Cape Town and began collaborating with DJ Dope of Krushed & Sorted and Felix Laband on the music for a multi-media project he had conceptualized, involving a graphic novel with a soundtrack and live show. These sessions spawned the "Man With No Name" track on African Dope's Cape of Good Dope compilation in 2002, which later gradually mutated into The Constructus Corporation outfit.

== The Ziggurat ==
The Constructus Corporation's debut album, The Ziggurat, was released in 2002. It was a concept album, telling the story of a young rapper named Random Boy and his best friend, Kidtronic. The two protagonists live on a floating pyramid in outer space called the Ziggurat, and must save it from an entity known as the Constructus Corporation. It featured an accompanying graphic novel illustrated by Nikhil Singh.

The Ziggurat was Tudor Jones' first collaboration with vocalist Anri du Toit, who is now one half of Die Antwoord under the name Yolandi Visser, along with Tudor Jones. At the time, du Toit used the name Anica The Snuffling.

== Post-breakup and future tenures ==
Following the release of The Ziggurat, the Constructus Corporation disbanded, prompted largely by the record label's failure to release their album on time. Watkin Tudor Jones since expanded into the graphic arts field, fluffy toy-making and other creative outlets, releasing two more projects, such as the Watkin Tudor Jones solo project (also known as Fucknrad, with Sibot) and the multimedia project MaxNormal.TV (not to be confused with his other outlet, Max Normal) with Anri du Toit, who later had a daughter with Watkin named Sixteen Jones. Sibot and Markus Wormstorm later collaborated on the 3-CD album The Real Estate Agents, and Felix Laband went on to be signed by distinguished German independent label Compost Records.

== Discography ==
Studio albums

- The Ziggurat (2002)

The Ziggurat, as it appears completed
