= MaxNormal.TV =

Music group

- Also known as: Max Normal
- Origin: Cape Town, South Africa
- Genres: Electronic; trip hop; alternative hip hop; experimental hip hop
- Years active: 2001–2002; 2005–2008
- Labels: Runway; Chameleon
- Spinoffs: Die Antwoord
- Members: Watkin Tudor Jones; Yolandi Visser; Neon Don; Justin De Nobrega
- Past members: Simon Ringrose; Mark Buchanan; Sean Ou Tim; Jakob Basson; Brad Armitage

MaxNormal.TV (formerly Max Normal) was a South African music group that formed in 2001 and eventually evolved into Die Antwoord. The group's name was taken from a comic book character in the Judge Dredd comic of the same name.

== Early days ==
Watkin "Waddy" Tudor Jones was part of the South African hip-hop scene for many years, fronting such acts as The Original Evergreen. Mark Buchanan and Sean Ou Tim were veterans of the music industry, each being involved with numerous experimental, and many successful South African bands over the years. In the year prior to the formation of Max Normal, Tudor Jones released his debut solo album Memoirs of a Clone, which featured the band on some of the tracks. Due to the success of that album, a follow-up album was released with the entire band. The album, Songs From the Mall, was released on 23 July 2001. Both albums were produced, recorded, and mixed by Adrian Levi, the head of Chameleon Studios.

=== Formation ===
Max Normal was formed in 2001 by Mark Buchanan (electric bass/electric guitar), Sean Ou Tim (drums/keyboards/samples), Simon Ringrose (turntables/backing vocals) and Watkin Tudor Jones (vocals/programming). Max Normal performed at various festivals around the country, including Up the Creek, Splashy Fen, and Oppikoppi. They also had a very successful tour in Europe, where they played in London, as well as three shows at the world-renowned Pukkelpop Festival in Belgium, which was a huge success. It was stated that Nelly Furtado joined Waddy on one of his tracks.

=== Split ===
The last performance of Max Normal was supporting Faithless in Cape Town in 2002. Tudor Jones later disbanded the group and moved to Cape Town, where he started The Constructus Corporation while other members started Chromoscience. The band performed again in 2005, renamed as MaxNormal.TV, performing the track The Organ Grinder from their Fantastic Kill album. Tudor Jones stated that the .TV was added to the band name because he was tired of being asked when Max Normal was coming back, and because his former collaborators did not wish to rejoin the band.

The second incarnation of the band was introduced as a "multimedia" project as the band released a host of toys called Chommies, short films and various other merchandise. During this time, to promote the new Max Normal, Tudor Jones was selected to design for Oppikoppi 2007, which was based around one of his stuffed toys and partially based on the Dassie. In early 2008, the final Max Normal release Good Morning South Africa was bought out and the band broke up soon afterwards, to concentrate on Tudor Jones' new project Die Antwoord. As a footnote of what was to come of Die Antwoord, the album Good Morning South Africa gave out certain references as various lyrics, ideas and beats were used on the debut web release of $O$. The album Donker Mag would later also reuse the song "Moon Love" from "Good Morning South Africa."

== Discography ==
=== Albums ===
- 2001 Songs From The Mall (as Max Normal)
- 2008 Good Morning South Africa

=== EPs ===
- 2007 Rap Made Easy

=== Other appearances ===
- 2005 Organ Grinder on The Fantastic Kill by Watkin Tudor Jones (as Max Normal)
