= The Loeries =

- Description: Excellence in the marketing communications industry
- Location: Johannesburg (1978); Sun City (1979-2004); Margate, KwaZulu-Natal (2005-2009); Cape Town (2010-2014); Durban (2015-)
- Country: South Africa
- Presented by: The Loerie Awards Company NPC
- Website: loeries.com

The Loeries (The Loerie Awards Company NPC) is a non-profit company administering awards for the brand communications industry, in Africa and the Middle East.

== History ==
The Loerie Awards first took place in 1978 in Johannesburg. Television was introduced to South Africa relatively late in 1976, and the delay was due to the political belief at the time that television was "undesirable". Once television had finally been introduced, the first television commercials commenced in 1978, and consequently, the Loerie Awards were introduced in the same year to promote the new medium of television advertising.

Since 1978, new categories were regularly added and today the awards include not only traditional advertising, but recognise virtually every touch-point between a brand and the consumer - including architecture, design, digital media, live events, sponsorship, as well as integrated campaigns. In 2004, the Loeries were almost "consigned to the scrap heap." Until then, the awards were managed by the Marketing Federation of South Africa, but they were rescued by the Association for Communication and Advertising (ACA) South Africa and the Creative Circle South Africa who formed a new non-profit company to run the awards.

After the inaugural awards in Johannesburg in 1978, the awards were held for many years at Sun City until 2004. In 2005 the Loeries moved to Margate, KwaZulu-Natal, then to Cape Town in 2009, and in 2015 the awards will be hosted for the first time in Durban, KwaZulu-Natal.

Preetesh Sewraj has been the Chief Executive Officer since 2020 and Sibusiso Sitole is the current Chairperson.

== Loeries Creative Week ==
It has been estimated that Loeries Creative Week is worth ZAR100 million (approximately US$10 million).

Creative Week is a week long festival that begins with the judging of all the work. Over 160 judges from across the region as well as international jury chairmen assess the work. Finalists are announced every day and judging is concluded with a recently introduced "Seminar of Creativity." The winning work is announced on the Saturday and Sunday evenings at the end of the week.
