= Anton Kannemeyer =

South African comics artist

- Born: Anton Kannemeyer; 30 October 1967 (age 59) Cape Town, South Africa
- Area: Cartoonist
- Pseudonym: Joe Dog

Anton Kannemeyer (born 1967) is a South African comics artist, who sometimes goes by the pseudonym Joe Dog. Kannemeyer has lectured the University of Pretoria, Technikon Witwatersrand, and was also a senior lecturer at the University of Stellenbosch.

== Biography ==
Anton Kannemeyer was born in Cape Town. He studied graphic design and illustration at the University of Stellenbosch, and did a Master of Arts degree in illustration after graduating. Together with Conrad Botes, he co-founded the magazine Bitterkomix in 1992 and has become revered for its subversive stance and dark humor. He has been criticized for making use of "offensive, racist imagery". Kannemeyer himself said that he gets "lots of hate mail from white Afrikaners".

His works challenge the rigid image of Afrikaners promoted under Apartheid, and depict Afrikaners having nasty sex and mangling their Afrikaans. “X is for Xenophobia”, part of his "Alphabet of Democracy", depicts Ernesto Nhamwavane, a Mozambican immigrant who was burnt alive in Johannesburg in 2008. Some of Kannemeyer's works deal with the issues of race relations and colonialism, by appropriating the style of Hergé’s comics, namely from Tintin in the Congo. In "Pappa in Afrika", Tintin becomes a white African, depicted either as a white liberal or as a racist white imperialist in Africa. In this stereotyped satire, the whites are superior, literate and civilised, and the blacks are savage and dumb. In "Peekaboo", a large acrylic work, the white African is jumping up in alarm as a black man figure pokes his head out of the jungle shouting an innocuous 'peekaboo!' A cartoon called "The Liberals" has been interpreted as an attack on white fear, bigotry and political correctness: a group of anonymous black people (who look like golliwogs) are about to rape a white lady, who calls her attackers "historically disadvantaged men".

== Bibliography ==
- The Big Bad Bitterkomix Handbook (2006)
- Fear of a Black Planet (2008)
- Bitterkomix 15 (2008)
- Alphabet of Democracy (2010)
- Pappa in Afrika (2010)
- Bitterkomix 16 (2013)
- Bitterkomix 17 (2016)
- Bitterkomix 18 (2020)
- Bitterkomix 19 (2023)
- Bitterkomix Sketchbooks and Journals (2025)
