= Mount Ninji and da Nice Time Kid =

Studio album by Die Antwoord
- Released: 16 September 2016
- Genres: Alternative hip-hop; rave; punk rap; electronica
- Length: 54:01
- Producer: God (formerly DJ Hi-Tek)

Die Antwoord chronology
| Suck on This (2016) | Mount Ninji and da Nice Time Kid (2016) | House of Zef (2020) |

Die Antwoord studio album chronology
| Donker Mag (2014) | Mount Ninji and da Nice Time Kid (2016) | House of Zef (2020) |

Singles from Mount Ninji and da Nice Time Kid
- 1. "Gucci Coochie" Released: 18 May 2016; 2. "Banana Brain" Released: 22 July 2016; 3. "We Have Candy" Released: 18 August 2016; 4. "Fat Faded Fuck Face" Released: 8 September 2016

Professional ratings
Aggregate scores
| Source | Rating |
|---|---|
| Metacritic | 55/100 |
Review scores
| Source | Rating |
| Consequence of Sound | C |
| Drowned in Sound | 8/10 |
| Exclaim! | 6/10 |
| The Guardian | 2/5 stars |
| Pitchfork | 6.1/10 |

Mount Ninji and da Nice Time Kid (commonly referred to as simply "Mount Ninji") is the fourth studio album by Die Antwoord. It was released on 16 September 2016 through streaming platforms and as a digital download.

== Track listing ==
| No. | Title | Length |
|---|---|---|
| 1. | "We Have Candy" | 3:03 |
| 2. | "Daddy" | 3:59 |
| 3. | "Banana Brain" | 4:48 |
| 4. | "Shit Just Got Real" (featuring Sen Dog) | 3:48 |
| 5. | "Gucci Coochie" (featuring Dita Von Teese) | 4:05 |
| 6. | "Wings on My Penis" (featuring Lil Tommy Terror) | 1:15 |
| 7. | "U Like Boobies?" (featuring Lil Tommy Terror) | 1:15 |
| 8. | "Rats Rule" (featuring Jack Black) | 3:41 |
| 9. | "Jonah Hill" | 1:07 |
| 10. | "Stoopid Rich" | 3:05 |
| 11. | "Fat Faded Fuck Face" | 4:01 |
| 12. | "Peanutbutter + Jelly" | 2:21 |
| 13. | "Alien" | 4:16 |
| 14. | "Street Light" | 4:58 |
| 15. | "Darkling" | 3:35 |
| 16. | "I Don't Care" | 4:44 |
| Total length: | | 54:01 |

Japanese edition bonus track
| No. | Title | Length |
|---|---|---|
| 17. | "Banana Brain" (Instrumental) |

== Notes ==
- "We Have Candy" features Ninja reciting dialogue from John Carpenter's Big Trouble in Little China.
- "Lil Tommy Terror", who appears in the songs "Wings on My Penis" and "U Like Boobies?", was only 6 years old when those songs were recorded. His identity is unknown.
- "I Don't Care" is a cover of Soviet children song "Если с другом вышел в путь" by Vladimir Shainsky.

== Charts ==
=== Weekly charts ===
| Chart (2016) | Peak position |
|---|---|
| Australian Albums (ARIA) | 9 |
| Austrian Albums (Ö3 Austria) | 18 |
| Belgian Albums (Ultratop Flanders) | 3 |
| Belgian Albums (Ultratop Wallonia) | 14 |
| Canadian Albums (Billboard) | 16 |
| Dutch Albums (Album Top 100) | 40 |
| French Albums (SNEP) | 56 |
| German Albums (Offizielle Top 100) | 25 |
| Italian Albums (FIMI) | 53 |
| New Zealand Heatseekers Albums (RMNZ) | 2 |
| Polish Albums (ZPAV) | 11 |
| Scottish Albums (Official Charts) | 31 |
| Spanish Albums (PROMUSICAE) | 64 |
| Swiss Albums (Schweizer Hitparade) | 14 |
| UK Albums (Official Charts) | 52 |
| UK Independent Albums (Official Charts) | 2 |
| UK R&B Albums (Official Charts) | 4 |
| US Billboard 200 | 34 |
| US Top Dance Albums (Billboard) | 1 |
| US Independent Albums (Billboard) | 2 |

=== Year-end charts ===
| Chart (2016) | Position |
|---|---|
| Belgian Albums (Ultratop Flanders) | 161 |
| US Top Dance/Electronic Albums (Billboard) | 17 |
