= Paranoia (disambiguation) =

Paranoia is a thought process that typically includes persecutory delusions.

Paranoia may also refer to:

== Books ==
- Paranoia (Hermans book), a 1953 short story collection by the Dutch writer Willem Frederik Hermans
- Paranoia (magazine), a magazine established in 1992
- Paranoia (novel), a novel by Joseph Finder

== Film and television ==
- Paranoia (1967 film), a Dutch drama
- Paranoia (1969 film), originally titled Orgasmo, an Italian drama directed by Umberto Lenzi
- Paranoia (1970 film) (released in the U.S. as A Quiet Place to Kill, to avoid confusion with Orgasmo), an Italian film, also directed by Umberto Lenzi
- Paranoia, a 1998 cable TV American thriller starring Sally Kirkland
- Paranoia (2013 film), a thriller starring Gary Oldman, Liam Hemsworth and Harrison Ford
- Paranoia (2021 film), an Indonesian thriller drama film
- Paranoia (game show), a 2000 live, interactive American game show
- "Paranoia" (Brooklyn Nine-Nine), an episode
- "Paranoia" (Law & Order), an episode of Law & Order
- "Paranoia" (Law & Order: Special Victims Unit), an episode of Law & Order: Special Victims Unit

== Games ==
- Paranoia (role-playing game), a 1984 dystopian science-fiction role-playing game
- Paranoia (video game), a 1995 Czech videogame

== Music ==
- Paranoia (album), 1999 album by Nikolai Noskov
- Paranoia: A True Story, 2017 EP by Dave East
- Paranoia 2, 2018 mixtape by Dave East

=== Songs ===
- "Paranoia" (A Day to Remember song), 2016
- "Paranoia" (Eiko Shimamiya song), 2009
- "Paranoia", by 180 (Naoki Maeda) from the video game Dance Dance Revolution
- "Paranoia", by Hawkwind from Hawkwind
- "Paranoia", by Lovebites from Glory, Glory, to the World
- "Paranoia", by Royce da 5'9" from Independent's Day
- "Paranoia", by Sam Roberts from We Were Born in a Flame
- "Paranoia", by Soulfly from Conquer
- "Paranoia", by White Ash from Quit or Quiet
- "Paranoia, Paranoia", by Bauhaus, a B-side of the single "Lagartija Nick"

== See also ==
- cdparanoia, a CD-ripping tool
- Paranoia 1.0, a 2004 science-fiction film
- Paranoiac (film), a horror movie
- Paranoid (disambiguation)
- "Paranoimia," a 1986 song by the Art of Noise
