= Perfect World (Eiko Shimamiya album) =

Studio album by Eiko Shimamiya
- Released: 28 April 2010
- Genre: New-age
- Length: 46:49
- Label: Geneon
- Producer: I've Sound

Eiko Shimamiya chronology
Hikari Nadeshiko (2008)	Perfect World (2010)	E.P.S -Eiko PRIMARY SELECTION- (2011)

Singles from Perfect World
- 1. "Chikai" Released: April 9, 2009; 2. "Super Scription of Data" Released: June 24, 2009

Perfect World is the sixth album from Eiko Shimamiya, and 3rd full length. released on April 28, 2010, by NBC Universal Entertainment Japan.

== Track listing ==
All lyrics are written by Eiko Shimamiya.

No.	Title	Music	Arrangement	Length
1.	"Perfect World"	Eiko Shimamiya	Eric Mouquet (Deep Forest)	6:27
2.	"Binaural Beat"	Eiko Shimamiya	SORMA No.1	5:48
3.	"Haruzora (春空)"	Eiko Shimamiya	Tomoyuki Nakazawa	5:13
4.	"OXISOLS"	SORMA No.1	SORMA No.1	5:15
5.	"Dhobi Ghat"	Eiko Shimamiya	Seiichi Kyouda	4:53
6.	"Yubi (指)"	Chizuko Moriai	Yukiko Sakai	5:14
7.	"Sunny Place"	Eiko Shimamiya	Yukiko Sakai	4:41
8.	"electric universe"	SORMA No.1	SORMA No.1	5:44
9.	"day by day"	Eiko Shimamiya	Seiichi Kyouda	3:34
