= Silent Weapons for Quiet Wars (document) =

Alleged document from the mid-1980s

- Author: Lyle Hartford Van Dyke Jr. (claimed); popularized by William Cooper
- Original title: Silent Weapons for Quiet Wars: An Introduction Programming Manual
- Language: English
- Subject: Social engineering, Economic manipulation
- Genre: Economic politics
- Publisher: Unpublished/leaked
- Publication date: Allegedly 1979 (discovered 1986)
- Publication place: United States
- Media type: Pamphlet

Silent Weapons for Quiet Wars: An Introduction Programming Manual (often shortened to Silent Weapons for Quiet Wars or simply Silent Weapons) is an alleged clandestine document that first surfaced in the mid-1980s and purports to outline strategies of global social engineering using a "weapon" of continuous institutional manipulation by "those in positions of power." It is widely regarded as a conspiracy theory text.

The work does not offer an author instead only remarking that "This publication marks the 25th Anniversary of the Third World War, called the 'Quiet War,' being conducted using subjective biological warfare, fought with 'silent weapons.'" The document supports anti-American activities stating:

The objective of such studies is to acquire the know-how to set the public economy into a predictable state of motion or change, even a controlled self-destructive state of motion which will convince the public that certain 'expert' people should take control of the money system and reestablish security (rather than liberty and justice) for all. When the subject citizens are rendered unable to control their financial affairs, they, of course, become totally enslaved, a source of cheap labor."

Although it gained notoriety through radio host Milton William Cooper's 1991 book Behold a Pale Horse, credit for its compilation is attributed to Lyle Hartford Van Dyke Jr., who emerged years later claiming to be the principal author of it.

== Discovery and content ==
According to versions of its text, an employee of Boeing Aircraft Company discovered a copy inside a surplus IBM copier purchased at auction from McChord Air Force Base in July 1986. It says the copier allegedly held the only copy of the pamphlet, which was then passed along and publicized in the Promise Newsletter, in Phoenix, Arizona. In the 1990s, radio host Milton William Cooper popularized the pamphlet in his book Behold a Pale Horse, suggesting it to be a blueprint for elite societal domination. Later, Lyle Hartford Van Dyke Jr., who was incarcerated at the time, claimed authorship of the document, calling it a collage of ideas he compiled, not an original work.

In a letter dated December 2003 to Paranoia Magazine, Van Dyke wrote that he had compiled the manual around October 1978, sent out about 65 initial copies to personal contacts, and that one copy he gave to a hitchhiking military individual at McChord AFB ended up in the copier's surplus sale.

The pamphlet portrays a so-called "Third World War" being waged quietly through instruments such as economic control, data manipulation and social engineering rather than overt violence. It describes "silent weapons" as data-driven tools—computational in nature—that manipulate social structures without producing immediate, visible harm, yet cause large-scale societal damage over time, hence the name 'silent weapons'.

It draws upon early systems of Operations Research and cybernetics developed during and after World War II to suggest how societal behaviors can be predicted, manipulated and controlled by the ruling power structures including Rockefeller Foundation and Harvard College using data systems and strategic programming.

The document allegorizes society as a computer network, with individuals and industries as nodes that can be “programmed,” manipulated, or destabilized through information control, economic shocks, and targeted messaging. It includes technical diagrams—many of which seem convincing—to explain the mechanism of psychological and technological control.

== Reception and interpretation ==
Scholars and skeptics largely dismiss the document as a conspiracy construct or hoax, often categorizing it among "New World Order" mythology. However, it continues to be cited in fringe communities as a cautionary metaphor of institutional control. Van Dyke himself defended its legitimacy, describing it as an intentional warning about the suppression of collective consciousness, not a genuine covert directive.

In Behold a Pale Horse, Cooper endorsed the text's implications, further fueling its mystique and circulation.
