= Higurashi =

Higurashi may refer to:

- Tanna japonensis, a type of cicada native to Japan
- Shūichi Higurashi (1936–2012), a Japanese manga illustrator and magazine artist
- Akane Higurashi, a fictional character from the anime and manga series My-HiME
- the name of several fictional characters from the manga and anime series Inuyasha

== See also ==
- Higurashi: When They Cry, a Japanese dōjin sound novel, anime, and manga series
  - Higurashi Daybreak, a computer game based on the visual novel
  - "Higurashi no Naku Koro ni (song)", the opening theme of the anime series
