= Naraku no Hana =

Single by Eiko Shimamiya

from the album Hikari Nadeshiko
- B-side: "FLOW"
- Released: August 22, 2007
- Genre: Industrial rock
- Length: 19:18
- Label: Frontier Works
- Songwriter(s): Tomoyuki Nakazawa, Eiko Shimamiya
- Producer(s): I've Sound

Eiko Shimamiya singles chronology
"Higurashi no Naku Koro ni" (2006)	"Naraku no Hana" (2007)	"WHEEL OF FORTUNE" (2008)

"Naraku no Hana" (奈落の花, Flower of Hell) [also read as Flower in Hell] is Eiko Shimamiya's second single produced by I've Sound and Geneon Entertainment. It was released on August 22, 2007. It was able to reach #12 in the Oricon weekly charts making this Eiko's most successful single. It has sold more than 34,000 copies and stayed in the charts for 15 weeks. The title track was used as the opening theme for the anime series, Higurashi no Naku Koro ni Kai, which is the sequel to the anime Higurashi no Naku Koro ni.

== Track listing ==
1. Naraku no Hana (奈落の花) – 5:01
  Composition: Tomoyuki Nakazawa
  Arrangement: Tomoyuki Nakazawa, Takeshi Ozaki
  Lyrics: Eiko Shimamiya
2. Flow (FLOW) – 4:39
  Composition: Eiko Shimamiya
  Arrangement: SORMA No.1
  Lyrics: Eiko Shimamiya
3. Naraku no Hana (Instrumental) (奈落の花 (Instrumental)) – 5:01
4. Flow (Instrumental) (FLOW (Instrumental)) – 4:37
