= Higurashi no Naku Koro ni (song) =

"Higurashi no Naku Koro Ni"

Single by Eiko Shimamiya

from the album O (A-side) Hikari Nadeshiko (B-side)
- B-side: "All Alone"
- Released: May 24, 2006
- Genre: Trance; Electropop; J-pop; Industrial
- Length: 20:56
- Label: Frontier Works
- Songwriters: Tomoyuki Nakazawa, Kazuya Takase, Eiko Shimamiya
- Producer: I've Sound

Eiko Shimamiya singles chronology
"Higurashi no Naku Koro Ni" (2006)	"“Naraku no Hana” " (2007)

“Higurashi no Naku Koro Ni” (ひぐらしのなく頃に, When the cicadas cry) is the first single of Eiko Shimamiya under I've Sound and Geneon Entertainment label. Released on May 24, 2006, and reached #18 in the Oricon weekly charts. It has sold an approximate total of 35,000 copies and stayed in the charts for 26 weeks making this Eiko's most selling and longest charting single to date. The title track was used as the opening theme for the first season of the anime series Higurashi: When They Cry, and was also used as the ending theme of the first episode of Higurashi: When They Cry – Gou. Composition wise, it is written in the key of E Minor.

Note: If played backwards, the inclusion of the word Nigerarenai (逃げられない, "you cannot escape") is easily audible; this was later addressed in Shimamiya's second single, “Naraku no Hana”

== Track List ==
All lyrics are written by Eiko Shimamiya.

No.	Title	Music	Length
1.	"Higurashi no Naku Koro Ni (ひぐらしのなく頃に)"	Tomoyuki Nakazawa, Kazuya Takase	4:27
2.	"All Alone"	Kazuya Takase	6:04
3.	"Higurashi no Naku Koro Ni (ひぐらしのなく頃に)" (instrumental)	Tomoyuki Nakazawa, Kazuya Takase	4:23
4.	"All Alone" (instrumental)	Kazuya Takase	6:02
Total length:			20:56
