= Make It Better (disambiguation) =

Make It Better may refer to:

- Make It Better, 2000 album by Dubstar
- "Make It Better (Forget About Me)", 1983 song by Tom Petty and the Heartbreakers
- "Make It Better", song by Mitsu-O! from Dance Dance Revolution
