= Eiko Shimamiya =

Female J-pop singer-songwriter (born 1965)

Eiko Shimamiya 島みやえい子
- Born: April 20, 1965 (age 61); Chitose, Hokkaido, Japan
- Genres: J-pop; trance; techno; new-age; electronica
- Occupations: Singer-songwriter; Lyricist; Composer; Record producer; Voice trainer; Radio personality
- Instrument: Vocals
- Years active: 1999–present
- Labels: Geneon Universal Entertainment (2005–2011); ETB MUSIC (2012); Frontier Works (2015); infinity (2011–present)
- Website: www.eiko-shimamiya.com

Eiko Shimamiya (島みや えい子, Shimamiya Eiko; born April 20, 1965), also called Eiko or Peko, is a female J-pop singer-songwriter, and producer who is currently affiliated with Heart Company. She is best known for singing the opening themes of the anime series Higurashi When They Cry. Eiko also handles a school called Shimamiya Size (S-size) in Sapporo. Some of her former students are I've Sound singers Mami Kawada, Kotoko and Kaori Utatsuki. She announced on May 10, 2010, via Twitter that she was diagnosed with thyroid cancer. Her "Perfect World Live Tour", which was scheduled to begin in June, was subsequently canceled. She made an announcement of her full recovery from cancer on January 28, 2011.

== Discography ==
=== Albums ===
==== Solo albums ====
	Year	Information	Oricon chart peaks	
	Year	Information	Daily	Weekly
1st	2006	O	—	35
2nd	2008	Hikari Nadeshiko	14	27
3rd	2010	Perfect World	—	94
4th	2021	Aquarius+	—	—

==== Compilation albums ====
	Year	Information	Oricon chart peaks
	Year	Information	Weekly
1st	2011	E.P.S: Eiko Primary Selection	84

==== Extended plays (EPs) ====
	Year	Information	Oricon chart peaks
	Year	Information	Weekly
1st	2001	Hologram	—
2nd	2002	Vanilla	—
3rd	2003	Ozone	—
4th	2005	Ulysses	87
5th	2005	Endless Loop	95

==== Compilation albums ====
List of albums with at least one Eiko Shimamiya song. It may or may not be produced by her.

Year	Album	Oricon chart peaks	
Year	Album	Daily	Weekly
1999	I've Girls Compilation Vol. 1 – Regret	—	—
2000	I've Girls Compilation Vol. 2 – Verge	—	—
2001	C-Lick	—	—
2002	I've Girls Compilation Vol. 3 – Disintegration	—	—
2002	Dirty Gift	—	—
2003	I've Girls Compilation Vol. 4 – Lament	—	—
2003	I've Girls Compilation Vol. 5 – Out Flow	—	—
2004	Mixed Up	—	—
2005	I've Girls Compilation Vol. 6 – Collective	—	—
2007	Short Circuit II	—	25
2007	I've Mania Tracks Vol.I	—	—
2008	Master Groove Circle	—	35
2008	The Front Line Covers	—	—
2009	I've Mania Tracks Vol.II	—	—
2009	Master Groove Circle 2	33	178
2010	I've Girls Compilation Vol. 7 – Extract	—	—
2010	I've Mania Tracks Vol.III	—	—
2011	Tribal Link-L	—	—
2011	Tribal Link-R	—	—
2011	5Tears Vol. 1	—	—
2012	G.C. Best -I've Girls Compilation Best-	—	157
2012	Omaira Best -Short Circuit Best-	—	—
2012	5Tears Vol. 2	—	—
2014	Exchange	—	—

=== Singles ===
	Year	Title	Oricon chart peaks		Album
	Year	Title	Daily	Weekly	Album
*	2003	"Aoi Kajitsu / Scarborough Fair"	—	—	Hikari Nadeshiko
1st	2006	"Higurashi no Naku Koro ni"	—	18	O
2nd	2007	"Naraku no Hana"	—	12	Hikari Nadeshiko
3rd	2008	"Wheel of Fortune (Unmei no Wa)"	13	23	E.P.S -Eiko PRIMARY SELECTION-
4th	2009	"Chikai"	19	39	Perfect World
5th	2009	"Super Scription of Data"	21	35	Perfect World
6th	2009	"Paranoia"	—	185	Non-album singles
7th	2012	"Onkalo"	—	—	Non-album singles
8th	2012	"Yellow"	—	—	Non-album singles
9th	2013	"Jaiko"	—	—	Non-album singles
10th	2015	"Kokuchou no Psychedelica"	—	176	Non-album singles
11th	2019	"Photon"	—	—	Aquarius+

==== Indie Singles ====
#	Year	Title	Album
1st	2000	"Takino no Mori"	Non-album singles
2nd	2003	"Myou"	Non-album singles
3rd	2003	"Atashi wa Melon"	Non-album singles
4th	2004	"Yume no Rosen/Anata wo Nosete"	Non-album singles

=== Other appearances ===
Title	Year	Main Artist	Album	Peak
"The Heat of My Fingertips" feat. Eiko Shimamiya x Yuuhei Satellite	2021	Touhou LostWord	—	—

=== Other songs ===
==== Solo works ====
Year	Title	Album	Track
1998	"Aoao to (あおあおと)"	—	—
1999	"Shiawase na Yoru (しあわせな夜)"	—	—
2003	"Aa Seishun (あぁ青春)"	—	—
2004	"Michibikareshi Tamashii no Keifu (導かれし魂の系譜)"	Maboroshi Rin no Hime Shougun II Sound Collection	#01
2004	"ADSR"	Silent Half Tokuten Ongaku CD	#05
2005	"Warawanai Musume (笑わない娘)"	Doll ~ Utahime Vol. 5 -Hibiki-	#01
2005	"Sad Vibration"	Doll ~ Utahime Vol. 5 -Hibiki-	#10
2005	"Tsutaeyuku Uta (伝えゆく唄)"	—	—
2007	"Inochi no Uta (いのちのうた)"	—	—
2007	"The Christmas Song"	Eiko Shimamiya Acoustic Nite 2007	No. 10
2008	"In myself"	—	—
2011	"Karma no Inori (業の祈り)"	—	—

==== I've Sound works ====
Year	Title	Album	Track
2000	"Komoriuta (子守唄)"	Shin Ruri Iro no Yuki ~Furimukeba Tonari ni~ Shokai Tokuten CD	No. 02
2000	"Dreamer -Remix-"	Senpai Meekaa Tsuuhan Tokuten CD	—
2000	"Fuyuzora no Kiseki (冬空の軌跡)"	Snow Drop Doukori CD	—
2000	"PREY"	Nightmare 4.1	—
2000	"Sacred Words"	Sense Off OST	No. 01
2000	"Tooryanse (とおりゃんせ)"	Tooryanse Sofmap Tokuten CD	—
2000	"Tooryanse -Remix-"	A Compilation Album of PC-Game Musics	No. 07
2002	"Sora wo Mau Tsubasa (空を舞う翼)"	Blue-Sky-Blue Dreamcast Banshokai Tokuten CD	—
2002	"Pirouette"	ONE and ONLY	—
2005	"Amazing Grace"	Eiko Shimamiya LIVE 2005 "ULYSSES" Live Pamphlet	—
2006	"Cover Link"	Rensa Byoutou Shokai Tokuten CD	—

=== As producer ===
==== Extended plays (EPs) ====
#	Year	Information
1st	2011	5Tears
2nd	2012	5Tears Vol.2
3rd	2013	5Tears Vol. 3: Sweet Dragon
