= Paranoid (disambiguation) =

Paranoid refers to paranoia, a thought process that typically includes persecutory beliefs.

Paranoid may also refer to:

== Music ==
- Paranoid (band), a German EBM group 1987–1999
- Paranoid (album) or the title song (see below), by Black Sabbath, 1970

=== Songs ===
- "Paranoid" (Black Sabbath song), 1970
- "Paranoid" (Jonas Brothers song), 2009
- "Paranoid" (Kanye West song), 2009
- "Paranoid" (Post Malone song), 2018
- "Paranoid" (Ty Dolla Sign song), 2013
- "Paranoid", by Coi Leray from Trendsetter, 2022
- "Paranoid", by Dizzee Rascal from Maths + English, 2007
- "Paranoid", by Grand Funk Railroad from Grand Funk, 1969
- "Paranoid", by I Prevail from Trauma, 2019
- "Paranoid", by Ken Carson from A Great Chaos, 2023
- "Paranoid", by Lauv from I Met You When I Was 18 (The Playlist), 2018
- "Paranoid", by Psy'Aviah from Eclectric, 2010
- "Paranoid", by Spring King from A Better Life, 2018

== Other uses ==
- Paranoid (film), a 2000 thriller directed by John Duigan
- Paranoid (TV series), a 2016 British crime drama
- "Paranoid: A Chant", a 1985 poem by Stephen King

== See also ==
- Paranoia (disambiguation)
