= Wheel of Fortune (Eiko Shimamiya song) =

Single by Eiko Shimamiya
- B-side: "Diorama"
- Released: April 16, 2008
- Genre: J-Pop
- Length: 21:16
- Label: Frontier Works
- Songwriters: Kazuya Takase, Eiko Shimamiya
- Producer: I've Sound

Eiko Shimamiya singles chronology
"Naraku no Hana" (2007)	"Wheel of Fortune" (2008)	"Chikai" (2009)

"Wheel of Fortune" (運命の輪, Unmei no Wa) is Eiko Shimamiya's third single produced by I've Sound and Geneon Entertainment label. It was released on April 16, 2008. The title track is used as the opening theme to the live-action movie adaptation of the visual novel Higurashi no Naku Koro ni. The B-side "Diorama" is the ending theme to the series.

The special edition for this single was a DVD containing the PV for Wheel of Fortune.

== Track listing ==
1. Wheel of Fortune (運命の輪) -- 5:03
  Composition: Kazuya Takase
  Arrangement: Kazuya Takase
  Lyrics: Eiko Shimamiya
2. ディオラマ (Diorama) —5:36
  Composition: Tomoyuki Nakazawa
  Arrangement: Tomoyuki Nakazawa
  Lyrics: Eiko Shimamiya
3. Wheel of Fortune (運命の輪) -instrumental- -- 5:04
4. ディオラマ (Diorama) -instrumental- - 5:33

== Charts and sales ==
Oricon Ranking (Weekly)	Sales
23	7,783
