= O (Eiko Shimamiya album) =

Studio album by Eiko Shimamiya
- Released: 4 October 2006
- Recorded: 2005–2006
- Genre: J-pop
- Length: 1 hour 1 min 58 sec
- Label: Geneon
- Producer: I've

Eiko Shimamiya chronology
Endless Loop (2005)	O (2006)	Hikari Nadeshiko (2008)

O is the first full-length album from Eiko Shimamiya, it includes the hit single Higurashi no Naku Koro ni (opening from the same-titled anime). A limited edition with a DVD including the music video of Higurashi no Naku Koro ni is available. The album charted for five weeks on the Oricon charts and sold 10,000 copies.

== Track listing ==
All lyrics are written by Eiko Shimamiya.

No.	Title	Music	Arranger	Length
1.	"O"	Eiko Shimamiya	Kazuya Takase	4:00
2.	"Egao wo Misete" (笑顔を見せて)	Shimamiya	Tomoyuki Nakazawa	5:49
3.	"Canarian no Kanaderu Yume" (カ－ネリアンの奏でる夢)	Shimamiya	Junpei Fujita	5:56
4.	"Mune no Cross" (胸のクロス)	Shimamiya	Maiko Iuchi	6:18
5.	"Kyūdō no Hito (Remix)" (求道の人 -remix-)	Shimamiya	Takase	4:59
6.	"Taiyo" (太陽 Sun)	Shimamiya	Sorma No.1	7:33
7.	"I Need You"	Shimamiya	Takase	4:54
8.	"Sora no Mahoroba" (宇宙(そら)のまほろば)	Shimamiya	Sorma No.1	5:56
9.	"Ginga no Ko" (銀河の子)	Shimamiya	C.G mix	4:51
10.	"Recovery"	Shimamiya	Yui Isshiki	5:24
11.	"Higurashi no Naku Koro ni" (ひぐらしのなく頃に)	Nakazawa	Nakazawa, Takase	4:25
12.	"Doko ni mo Nai Michi" (どこにも無い道)	Shimamiya	Iuchi	6:08

== Credits ==
- Eiko Shimamiya: Lyrics (excepting Sora no Mahoroba) and music (excepting Higurashi no Naku Koro ni)
- Kazuya Takase: Arrangement for tracks 1, 4, 7, and 11.
- Tomoyuki Nakazawa: Arrangement for tracks 2 and 11. Music for track 11.
- SORMA: Arrangement for tracks 6 and 8.
- Maiko Iuchi: Arrangement for tracks 5 and 12.
- Additional arrangement: Jyunpei Fujita, C.G mix, Yui Isshiki respectively for tracks 3, 9, and 10.
