= Chikai (Eiko Shimamiya song) =

Single by Eiko Shimamiya
- B-side: "OXISOLS"
- Released: April 8, 2009
- Genre: J-Pop
- Length: 19:44
- Label: Frontier Works
- Songwriter(s): Tomoyuki Nakazawa, Eiko Shimamiya
- Producer(s): I've Sound

Eiko Shimamiya singles chronology
"Wheel of Fortune" (2007)	"Chikai" (2009)	"Super Scription of Data" (2009)

"Chikai" (誓い, "Vow") is Eiko Shimamiya's fourth single produced by I've Sound and Geneon Entertainment label. It is set to be released on April 8, 2009, a year after releasing her third single "Wheel of Fortune". The title track is used as the opening theme for Higurashi no Naku Koro ni Chikai (ひぐらしのなく頃に誓), the live-action film sequel for the first Higurashi no Naku Koro ni live-action film.

The single's catalog number is FCCJ-0003 for the regular CD-only edition since it won't be having a limited CD+DVD edition. Overall, this will be Shimamiya's fourth tie-in with the Higurashi no Naku Koro ni series.

== Track listing ==
1. Chikai (誓い)—4:41
  Composition: Tomoyuki Nakazawa
  Arrangement: Tomoyuki Nakazawa, Takeshi Ozaki
  Lyrics: Eiko Shimamiya
2. OXISOLS—5:15
  Composition/Arrangement: SORMA No.1
  Lyrics: Eiko Shimamiya
3. Chikai (誓い) -instrumental- -- 4:36
4. OXISOLS -instrumental- -- 5:12

== Charts and sales ==
Chart (2009)	Peak position	Total sales
Oricon Daily Chart	19	3,582
Oricon Weekly Chart	39	3,582
