= Super Scription of Data =

"Super scription of data"

Single by Eiko Shimamiya
- B-side: "electric universe"
- Released: June 24, 2009
- Genre: J-pop; Industrial rock Pop rock Synthpop; Trance
- Length: 20:35
- Label: Frontier Works
- Songwriter(s): Eiko Shimamiya, Kazuya Takase

Eiko Shimamiya singles chronology
"'Chikai'" (2009)	"Super scription of data" (2009)	"'Paranoia'" (2009)

Super scription of data is the 5th single of J-pop singer Eiko Shimamiya. The title track was used as the opening theme for Higurashi no Naku Koro ni Rei, having made this Shimamiya's fifth tie-in with the series.

This single's catalog number is FCCM-267 and it came in a regular CD only edition.

== Track listing ==
1. Super scription of data—4:35
  Lyrics: Eiko Shimamiya
  Composition/Arrangement: Kazuya Takase
2. electric universe—5:44
  Lyrics: Eiko Shimamiya
  Composition/Arrangement: SORMA No.1
3. Super scription of data (instrumental) -- 4:35
4. electric universe (instrumental) -- 5:41

== Charts ==
Chart	Peak position
Oricon Daily Chart	21
Oricon Weekly Chart	35

Total sales: 3,915
