= Music of Dance Dance Revolution 2ndMix =

== List of songs ==
=== Arcade version ===
There are 26 new songs in this game. Three of which are only playable on STEP BATTLE mode. All songs from the previous version returned in this game.

Song	Artist	Note
Licensed songs (13 total)
"BAD GIRLS"	Juliet Roberts	from ZIPmania II
"BOOM BOOM DOLLAR"	King Kong & D.Jungle Girls	from Dancemania Super Classics 1
"BOYS"	SMiLE.dk	from Dancemania X1
"DUB-I-DUB"	ME & MY	from Dancemania EXTRA
"EL RITMO TROPICAL"	DIXIES GANG	from Dancemania SUMMERS 2
"GET UP'N MOVE"	S&K	from Dancemania BASS#2
"HERO"	PAPAYA	from Dancemania EXTRA
"I believe in miracles"	HI-RISE	from Dancemania X1
"IF YOU WERE HERE"	JENNIFER	from Dancemania EXTRA
"LOVE"	SONIC DREAM	from Dancemania X1
"SMOKE"	MR.ED JUMPS THE GUN	from Dancemania WINTERS
"stomp to my beat"	JS16	from Dancemania WINTERS
"TUBTHUMPING"	CHUMBAWAMBA	from Dancemania EXTRA
Konami Original songs (8 total)
"AM-3P"	KTz	New Konami Original
"BRILLIANT 2U"	NAOKI	New Konami Original
"BRILLIANT 2U (Orchestra-Groove)"	NAOKI	New Konami Original
"MAKE IT BETTER (So-REAL Mix)"	mitsu-O! SUMMER	New Konami Original
"PARANOiA MAX ~DIRTY MIX~"	190	New Konami Original
"PUT YOUR FAITH IN ME"	UZI-LAY	New Konami Original
"PUT YOUR FAITH IN ME (Jazzy Groove)"	UZI-LAY	New Konami Original
"SP-TRIP MACHINE ~JUNGLE MIX~"	DE-SIRE	New Konami Original
From Console Version (2 total)
"MAKE A JAM!"	U1	from Dance Dance Revolution (PS)
"PARANOiA KCET ~clean mix~"	2MB	from Dance Dance Revolution (PS)
STEP BATTLE only (3 total)
"20, NOVEMBER (D.D.R. VERSION)"	N.M.R feat. DJ nagureo	New Konami Original
"KEEP ON MOVIN'"	N.M.R	New Konami Original
"LET THEM MOVE"	N.M.R	New Konami Original

=== Home Version ===
The home version has all new songs from the original arcade and Link Version, three Console Konami Original, and three carryovers from previous version. The STEP BATTLE songs are now given full set of stepcharts that would be added on the arcade version of Dance Dance Revolution 3rdMix. In addition, it has two preview songs for the next mix that only playable on Basic difficulty. With the exception of STRICTLY BUSINESS of Dance Dance Revolution was removed of Sega's Dreamcast console version.

Song	Artist	Note
Licensed songs (13 total)
"BAD GIRLS"	Juliet Roberts	from ZIPmania II
"BOOM BOOM DOLLAR"	King Kong & D.Jungle Girls	from Dancemania Super Classics 1
"BOYS"	SMiLE.dk	from Dancemania X1
"DUB-I-DUB"	ME & MY	from Dancemania EXTRA
"EL RITMO TROPICAL"	DIXIES GANG	from Dancemania SUMMERS 2
"GET UP'N MOVE"	S&K	from Dancemania BASS#2
"HERO"	PAPAYA	from Dancemania EXTRA
"I believe in miracles"	HI-RISE	from Dancemania X1
"IF YOU WERE HERE"	JENNIFER	from Dancemania EXTRA
"LOVE"	SONIC DREAM	from Dancemania X1
"SMOKE"	MR.ED JUMPS THE GUN	from Dancemania WINTERS
"stomp to my beat"	JS16	from Dancemania WINTERS
"TUBTHUMPING"	CHUMBAWAMBA	from Dancemania EXTRA
New Konami Original songs (3 total)
"LOVE THIS FEELIN'"	Chang Ma	New Konami Original
"think ya better D"	sAmi	New Konami Original
"TRIP MACHINE ~luv mix~"	2MB	New Konami Original
Konami Original songs (11 total)
"20, NOVEMBER (D.D.R. VERSION)"	N.M.R feat. DJ nagureo	from Dance Dance Revolution 2ndMix as STEP BATTLE only
"AM-3P"	KTz	from Dance Dance Revolution 2ndMix
"BRILLIANT 2U"	NAOKI	from Dance Dance Revolution 2ndMix
"BRILLIANT 2U (Orchestra-Groove)"	NAOKI	from Dance Dance Revolution 2ndMix
"KEEP ON MOVIN'"	N.M.R	from Dance Dance Revolution 2ndMix as STEP BATTLE only
"LET THEM MOVE"	N.M.R	from Dance Dance Revolution 2ndMix as STEP BATTLE only
"MAKE IT BETTER (So-REAL Mix)"	mitsu-O! SUMMER	from Dance Dance Revolution 2ndMix
"PARANOIA MAX ~DIRTY MIX~"	190	from Dance Dance Revolution 2ndMix
"PUT YOUR FAITH IN ME"	UZI-LAY	from Dance Dance Revolution 2ndMix
"PUT YOUR FAITH IN ME (Jazzy Groove)"	UZI-LAY	from Dance Dance Revolution 2ndMix
"SP-TRIP MACHINE ~JUNGLE MIX~"	DE-SIRE	from Dance Dance Revolution 2ndMix
From Previous Versions (5 total)
"MAKE A JAM!"	U1	from Dance Dance Revolution (PS)
"MAKE IT BETTER"	mitsu-O!	from Dance Dance Revolution
"PARANOiA"	180	from Dance Dance Revolution
"PARANOiA KCET ~clean mix~"	2MB	from Dance Dance Revolution (PS)
"TRIP MACHINE"	DE-SIRE	from Dance Dance Revolution
Preview songs (2 total)
"IN THE NAVY '99 (XXL Disaster Remix)"	CAPTAIN JACK	from Dancemania X3
"THE RACE"	CAPTAIN JACK	from Dancemania X4

== New songs ==
=== AM-3P ===
"AM-3P" is a song by Ktz.

=== Bad Girls ===
"Bad Girls" is a song by Juliet Roberts.

=== Boom Boom Dollar ===
"Boom Boom Dollar" is a song by King Kong & D. Jungle Girls.

=== Brilliant 2U ===
"Brilliant 2U" is a song by Naoki.

=== Brilliant 2U (Orchestra-Groove) ===
"Brilliant 2U (Orchestra-Groove)" is a remix of Brilliant 2U by Naoki.

=== Dub I Dub ===
"Dub I Dub" is a song by Me & My.

=== Get Up'n Move ===
"Get Up'n Move" is a song by S & K.

=== Hero ===
"Hero" is a song by Papaya.

=== I Believe In Miracles ===
"I Believe In Miracles" is a song by Hi-Rise.

=== If You Were Here ===
"If You Were Here" is a song by Jennifer.

=== Make It Better So-Real Mix ===
"Make It Better So-Real Mix" is a remix of Make It Better by Mitsu-O! Summer.

=== Paranoia Max ~Dirty Mix~ ===
"Paranoia Max ~Dirty Mix~" is a song by 190.

=== Put Your Faith In Me ===
"Put Your Faith In Me" is a song by Uzi-Lay.

=== Put Your Faith In Me (Jazzy Groove) ===
"Put Your Faith In Me (Jazzy Groove)" is a jazz arrangement of Put Your Faith In Me by Uzi-Lay.

=== Smoke ===
"Smoke" is a song by Mr.Ed Jumps the Gun. A cover of Smoke on the Water by Deep Purple.

=== SP-Trip Machine ~Jungle Mix~ ===
"SP-Trip Machine ~Jungle Mix~" is a song by De-Sire.

=== Stomp To My beat ===
"Stomp To My beat" is a song by JS16.

=== Tubthumping ===
"Tubthumping" is a song by Chumbawamba.
