= List of Higurashi When They Cry episodes =

When They Cry volume one DVD cover by Geneon

Higurashi When They Cry is a Japanese anime television series based on Ryukishi07's visual novel series. The English titles for the first season are accorded to the titles used by Funimation. English titles in the other seasons are not official.

The first season titled Higurashi no Naku Koro ni (ひぐらしのなく頃に). It was animated by Studio Deen, and produced by Frontier Works, Geneon Entertainment and Sotsu. The series was directed by Chiaki Kon, with Toshifumi Kawase handling series composition, Kyūta Sakai designing the characters and Kenji Kawai composing the music. It was released in English by Geneon and Funimation, under the title When They Cry – Higurashi no Naku Koro ni. The first season contains 26 episodes and aired from April 4 to September 26, 2006, on a number of television networks, including Chiba TV, Kansai TV and Tokai TV. The story follows five friends solving the case about unexplained murders occurred for three years in the village. The series is divided into six chapters which are based on the first six chapters in the original visual novel series. The first chapter is Onikakushi-hen (episodes 1 to 4), followed by Watanagashi-hen (episodes 5 to 8), and Tatarigoroshi-hen (episodes 9 to 13). Next is Himatsubushi-hen (episodes 14 and 15), the shortest of the story arcs. The last two chapters are Meakashi-hen (episodes 16 to 21) and Tsumihoroboshi-hen (episodes 22 through 26). An extra episode based on a short story written by Ryukishi07, Higurashi no Naku Koro ni Gaiden Nekogoroshi-hen (ひぐらしのなく頃に外伝 猫殺し編, lit. When The Cicadas Cry Side Story: Cat Killing Chapter), was released in Japan for the first season on July 27, 2007, as a bonus for purchasing all nine anime DVD volumes. The OVA includes opening and ending animations from the first season, but features Sakai's updated character designs from the second season.

The second season is titled When They Cry: Kai (ひぐらしのなく頃に解, Higurashi no Naku Koro ni Kai; lit. When The Cicadas Cry: Solution). It was produced by the same team and contains 24 episodes. The series aired in Japan between July 6 and December 17, 2007, on several television networks, such as Sun Television, TV Kanagawa and TV Saitama. The story continues what is left unexplained in the first season over the course of three separate story arcs. The first story is an anime-original arc called Yakusamashi-hen, which is followed by the last two arcs from the original visual novel series: Minagoroshi-hen and Matsuribayashi-hen. On September 18, 2007, a sixteen-year-old girl killed her father with an axe in Kyoto, Japan. The similarities between Rena and the incident were too strong. In response, Tokai TV replaced episode twelve of Kai on September 21, 2007, with a cooking show.

A five-episode original video animation (OVA) series, titled When They Cry: Rei (ひぐらしのなく頃に礼, Higurashi no Naku Koro ni Rei; lit. When The Cicadas Cry: Gratitude), was released from February 25 to August 21, 2009. Kawase takes over Kon's role as director, while Kazuya Kuroda takes over Sakai's role as character designer. It has two arcs taken from the fan disc of the same name and another arc adapted from a light novel released with the PlayStation version. Another four-episode OVA series to celebrate the 10th anniversary of the Higurashi franchise, titled Higurashi no Naku Koro ni Kira (ひぐらしのなく頃に煌, lit. When The Cicadas Cry: Glitter), was released from July 21, 2011, to January 25, 2012. Tomoyuki Abe took over Kuroda's role as character designer. The OVA film Higurashi no Naku Koro ni Kaku: Outbreak (ひぐらしのなく頃に拡〜アウトブレイク〜, lit. When The Cicadas Cry: Expansion ~Outbreak~) was adapted from the short story "Higurashi Outbreak", and was released on August 15, 2013. Sakai, who served as character designer for the first two seasons, returns for this OVA.

A new anime series, titled Higurashi: When They Cry – Gou (ひぐらしのなく頃に業, Higurashi no Naku Koro ni Gō; lit. When The Cicadas Cry: Karma), is animated by Passione and directed by Keiichiro Kawaguchi, with Takashi Ikehata serving as assistant director, Naoki Hayashi handling series composition, Akio Watanabe designing the characters and Kawai returning as music composer. The main cast will reprise their roles. The series was set premiere in July 2020, but was delayed to October 2020 due to the COVID-19 pandemic. It aired from October 1, 2020, to March 19, 2021. Funimation acquired the series and was streamed on the website in North America and the British Isles, and on AnimeLab in Australia and New Zealand. In Southeast Asia and South Asia, Medialink has acquired the series and is streaming the series on its YouTube channel Ani-One. The series ran for 24 episodes. The second season, Higurashi: When They Cry – Sotsu (ひぐらしのなく頃に卒, Higurashi no Naku Koro ni Sotsu; lit. When the Cicadas Cry: (Finishing, Graduation or Death)), aired from July 1 to September 30, 2021, with 15 episodes.

== Series overview ==
Season	Episodes	Originally released	
Season	Episodes	First released	Last released
When They Cry	26	April 4, 2006	September 26, 2006
Nekogoroshi-hen	1	July 27, 2007	
Kai	24	July 6, 2007	December 17, 2007
Rei	5	February 25, 2009	August 21, 2009
Kira	4	July 21, 2011	January 25, 2012
Outbreak	1	August 15, 2013	
Gou	24	October 1, 2020	March 19, 2021
Sotsu	15	July 1, 2021	September 30, 2021

== Episode list ==
=== When They Cry (2006) ===
No.	Title	Directed by	Written by	Original release date
1	"The Beginning (Chapter: Spirited Away by the Demon, Part 1)"; Transliteration: "Onikakushi-hen Sono Ichi – Hajimari" (Japanese: 鬼隠し編 其ノ壱 ハジマリ)	Chiaki Kon	Toshifumi Kawase	April 4, 2006
In a flashback, Keiichi Maebara kills Rena Ryugu and Mion Sonozaki with a baseball bat at his room that night. A few days earlier, Keiichi wakes up, walks to school with Rena and Mion, and lives with his friends in the rural village of Hinamizawa. Life is peaceful as Keiichi and Rena visit the town landfill in search for clues. Keiichi learns from Jiro Tomitake about the past murders and the dam construction proposed by the government five years earlier. The project met with protests and was withdrawn. When Keiichi asks Rena and Mion about any incidents relating to the project, they refuse to reply, which makes him suspicious. He gets even more suspicious as he and Rena discover the statue of Kenta, the parody of Colonel Sanders and Rena leaves to find a cleaver, he finds a newspaper article about the death of the manager. He learns that one of the killers is still at large.
2	"The Secret (Chapter: Spirited Away by the Demon, Part 2)"; Transliteration: "Onikakushi-hen Sono Ni – Kakushigoto" (Japanese: 鬼隠し編 其ノ弐 隠しごと)	Yūji Hiraki	Toshifumi Kawase	April 11, 2006
During the annual festival, Keiichi is informed by Tomitake and a long-blond hair woman name Miyo Takano, about "Oyashiro's curse". A series of murders and disappearances has occurred on the night of the festival for the past four years and are all supposedly caused by the curse of the village's tutelary deity, Oyashiro. The next day, Keiichi meets Oishi Kurado, and learns that Tomitake committed suicide by clawing his throat out and Takano disappeared. He becomes Oishi's informant. Keiichi notices changes in Rena and Mion's behavior, and suspects them of hiding something from him. He is also accused of keeping secrets by Rena because of his ties to Oishi. Keiichi delves deeper into the history of the curse, and Satoko Hojo's older brother, Satoshi, has been apparently transferred out of school in the village. At that point, Keiichi has a grim feeling, and realizes that Rena has been eavesdropping on him talking to Oishi on the phone outside his room the whole time.
3	"Suspicion (Chapter: Spirited Away by the Demon, Part 3)"; Transliteration: "Onikakushi-hen Sono San – Gishin" (Japanese: 鬼隠し編 其ノ参 疑心)	Takeshi Yoshimoto	Toshifumi Kawase	April 18, 2006
Growing increasingly paranoid, Keiichi calls in sick for school to avoid his friends and delve deeper into the case. Oishi tells Keiichi that all victims of Oyashiro's curse are connected to his group of friends. That night, Keiichi discovers a sewing needle inside the box of ohagi, which Rena and Mion gave him a few minutes earlier when they turned up to his house. Fearing for himself when he nearly gets hit by a white van during morning walk to school, Keiichi finds a baseball bat from the locker, owned by Satoshi. Mion and Rena notices him using the bat and acts suspicious. After school, Rena tells him that the bat which is confirmed by his name written on the bat knob much to Keiichi's surprise. She reveals that like Keiichi, Satoshi had displayed similar paranoid behaviors, Keiichi asks Rena about Satoshi's whereabouts, she insists that he already 'transferred' and warns Keiichi he will not do the same. At home, Keiichi gets a phone call from Oishi and discuss what he found until someone arrived outside the front door and press the door button.
4	"Disturbance (Chapter: Spirited Away by the Demon, Part 4)"; Transliteration: "Onikakushi-hen Sono Yon – Yugami" (Japanese: 鬼隠し編 其ノ四 歪)	Hisakazu Ishikawa	Toshifumi Kawase	April 25, 2006
Rena pays Keiichi a visit and attempts to enter the house, but he becomes paranoid and forces her to leave. Distressed by his aggressive behavior, Mion attempts to apologize to Keiichi, but he rebuffs her. After seeing Rena with a cleaver as school ends, Keiichi demands to know who caused all the murders and disappearances. The cackling Rena replies that it is all the work of Oyashiro and she could have prevented Satoshi from disappearing. Keiichi escapes from Rena, but he is taken back home by three grey uniformed guards. When Rena and Mion uses the syringe, Keiichi, already past his breaking point kills them with the bat. He calls and tells Oishi that the murders were caused by Oyashiro. However, Keiichi kills himself by clawing at his own throat, after knowing that Oyashiro is behind him. The next day, the police remove all the evidence from Keiichi's house, including a note hidden behind the wall clock. However, the syringe, also hidden there, was missing.
5	"Jealousy (Chapter: Cotton Drifting, Part 1)"; Transliteration: "Watanagashi-hen Sono Ichi – Shitto" (Japanese: 綿流し編 其ノ壱 嫉妬)	Son Seung-hee	Rika Nakase	May 2, 2006
The timeline of the last four episodes has been reset. Keiichi wins a doll in a competitive game at the toy store and gives it to Rena, implying to Mion that she is too masculine for it. Mion brushes it off, but is visibly upset. Keiichi meets Mion's younger twin sister, Shion at Angel Mort but assumes that's Mion impersonating her. He discovers that the twin sisters are particularly fond of him; Mion blushing when he talks to her and Shion visits him at home to give him her homemade bento lunch and rallying with other villagers of Hinamizawa to save him from being beaten up by three delinquents he accidentally angered. He realizes that Mion really has a twin sister, when he and Shion bump into her at the toy store Mion works there part-time.
6	"Takano (Chapter: Cotton Drifting, Part 2)"; Transliteration: "Watanagashi-hen Sono Ni – Takano" (Japanese: 綿流し編 其ノ弐 タカノ)	Osamu Sekita	Rika Nakase	May 9, 2006
Keiichi learns about the curse of the village when he meets Tomitake and Takano, a nurse at Irie Clinic. During Rika's ritual performance, Shion and Keiichi meet up with Tomitake and Takano to examine the ritual tool shed, and learn about the significance of the shrine as a torture chamber with its horrific history of removing innards from humans as a sacrifice offerings to Oyashiro. Takano, who is interested about the history, theorizes that the villagers are continuing the tradition of sacrificing people to Oyashiro. Shion and Keiichi promise not to tell anyone. Keiichi becomes disturbed when he is questioned both by Mion, and Oishi about the whereabouts of Shion, Tomitake and Takano. Keiichi receives a phone call from Shion and learns that Takano and Tomitake had already died after the festival. Since they died from the curse, they are needed to calm Oyashiro. Keiichi reprimands Shion that he was irresponsible and demands to know how she intends to take responsibility. Shion becomes upset and hangs up the phone.
7	"Lies (Chapter: Cotton Drifting, Part 3)"; Transliteration: "Watanagashi-hen Sono San – Uso" (Japanese: 綿流し編 其ノ参 嘘)	Isao Takayama	Rika Nakase	May 16, 2006
At school, Rika shows knowledge of Keiichi's actions and in a metaphorical conversation promises to help the 'little kitty cat who did something bad' on the night of the festival by making the 'big dogs' aware the 'kitty cat' had no bad intentions, and alludes to the fact that Mion is upset at Shion. She warns Keiichi that if the same 'dog' who bit the village leader tries to bite him, he should tell her. Keiichi learns that the village leader, Kimiyoshi disappeared. Shion tells him that she confessed to the village leader about what they did. Shion thinks it is her fault that the Curse got him because he had promised to help them. Keiichi believes Rika is also in danger. Keiichi, Rena and Mion go to Rika and Satoko's house, only to find them gone. However, Mion vindictively said that Satoko was the one who made Satoshi 'demoned away' and implied to cause Rika's disappearance too. Keiichi talks with Oishi; His account of the village leader's activities before disappearing contradicts Shion's claim that she confessed. Shion disappeared after laughing insanely over the phone after Keiichi confronts her.
8	"Wish (Chapter: Cotton Drifting, Part 4)"; Transliteration: "Watanagashi-hen Sono Yon – Negai" (Japanese: 綿流し編 其ノ四 願い)	Yūji Hiraki	Rika Nakase	May 23, 2006
Keiichi and Rena learn that Rika and Satoko disappeared and Rena suspects Mion was responsible for it. They confront Mion at her house because the police do not have enough probable cause for a search warrant. Mion admits that Rika and Satoko visited the house, and Mion killed them. She asks to have a private talk with Keiichi before the police arrest her, and she lures Keiichi to a torture chamber. He sees Shion locked up in the dungeon cell who screams at him to run, before Mion incapacitates him. As Mion prepares to torture Keiichi, she tells him the whole event would not have happened if he gave the doll to Mion, but stops after Keiichi, believing Mion to be possessed by Oyashiro and begging Mion to spare Shion for the body. Mion asks whether he wants to be spared as well, which Keiichi says is irrelevant compared to Shion's safety. Mion hears a noise and assumes Rena brought the police and tasers Keiichi unconscious. Keiichi and Shion leave the torture chamber. A few days later, Mion arrives at Keiichi's house during the night and stabs him in the stomach after he approaches her. At the hospital, Keiichi learns that Shion fell to her death from her apartment's balcony. Oishi asks Keiichi if he was certain it was Mion who attacked him. He confirms it. Oishi reveals the real Mion had already died at the bottom of the well. Then Oishi discusses about Takano herself, according to the autopsy report, Takano had already died hours before she broke into the ritual tool shed. After Oishi leaves, Mion ambushes Keiichi.
9	"Older Brother (Chapter: Curse Killing, Part 1)"; Transliteration: "Tatarigoroshi-hen Sono Ichi – Ani" (Japanese: 祟殺し編 其の壱 兄)	Takeshi Yoshimoto	Toshifumi Kawase	May 30, 2006
Once again, the timeline of the last four episodes have been reset. A female's mutilated body is suddenly found in a nearby town flowing down a sewerage canal. Keiichi's parents leave for Tokyo for a few days. Helped by Satoko and Rika, who make dinner for him, Keiichi gets to know about Satoshi from the former and his whereabouts on the night of last year's festival right before he 'transferred' (disappeared) a few days later. He decides to act as a surrogate brother to Satoko. At the baseball match and barbeque he was invited to by his friends, he meets Kyousuke Irie, the doctor and director of the Irie Clinic. They immediately bond over their concerns for Satoko's wellbeing. Irie tells Keiichi it has been three years since Satoshi and Satoko's parents died, after falling into a river from a canyon viewpoint. He also mentions that Satoshi had already 'transferred' last year much to Keiichi's confusion. Shion did not take well to it when Keiichi asks her about him and Rena claims Satoshi was cursed by Oyashiro and Mion does not even know where is Satoshi now.
10	"Bond (Chapter: Curse Killing, Part 2)"; Transliteration: "Tatarigoroshi-hen Sono Ni – Kizuna" (Japanese: 祟殺し編 其の弐 キズナ)	Hisakazu Ishikawa	Toshifumi Kawase	June 6, 2006
While Satoko is absent from school for a few days, Keiichi discovers that she is abused by her uncle Teppei when he saw bruises over her body as he pays a visit to her family's residence to check up on her. Irie, who helped drop her off from grocery shopping, notifies Keiichi that Teppei left the village after his wife was killed during the festival last year and came back a few days ago after his mistress died then stays around to avoid the Yakuza and coerce Satoko to do menial tasks for him. He also proclaims that Satoko assumed it was her own fault that Satoshi disappeared because she was overdependent on him and vows to endure Teppei's abuse in hopes that one day he will finally return home. A few days later, Satoko returns to school like Teppei never existed, but suffers a horrific mental breakdown during lunchtime after Keiichi pats her.
11	"Borderline (Chapter: Curse Killing, Part 3)"; Transliteration: "Tatarigoroshi-hen Sono San – Sakaime" (Japanese: 祟殺し編 其の参 境界)	Chiaki Kon	Toshifumi Kawase	June 13, 2006
Keiichi realizes Satoko will be traumatized for life, if Teppei keeps on abusing her and resolves to kill him for good. Over the phone, he asks Mion to take Satoko to the festival. When she asks him why he tells her he has some things to do. Mion mentions that is exactly what Satoshi said before he disappeared last year. After concluding that Satoshi was possibly the one who murdered his aunt instead of a drug addict to protect Satoko, Keiichi masterminds his plan to ambush Teppei in the woods and do the same thing that Satoshi did to his aunt. Keiichi kills Teppei using Satoshi's baseball bat then buries the body. While returning home while it is raining, Keiichi meets Takano driving her car, who picks him up and is surprised when she mentions that which Keiichi did to Teppei.
12	"Lost Item (Chapter: Curse Killing, Part 4)"; Transliteration: "Tatarigoroshi-hen Sono Yon – Nakushimono" (Japanese: 祟殺し編 其の四 失しモノ)	Matsuo Asami	Toshifumi Kawase	June 20, 2006
Keiichi drop off at home by Takano who later drives off and suddenly hears a footstep. The next day, he is disturbed when his friends tell him that he was actually at the Watanagashi festival with them all this time. Satoko still protests that Teppei's still abusing her even though Keiichi was certain he had already killed him. He goes to the Doctor's office, where he confesses the murder to Irie. Although he promises to help him, he overhears him talking to his assistant with preparations to put sedatives in the tea they were going to give him. Keiichi goes to the woods to exhume Teppei's body after he is skeptical that he killed the wrong person when Oishi shows up and forces him to dig a hole, only to find Teppei's body gone.
13	"Apology (Chapter: Curse Killing, Part 5)"; Transliteration: "Tatarigoroshi-hen Sono Go – Shazai" (Japanese: 祟殺し編 其の伍 謝罪)	Shigeru Ueda	Toshifumi Kawase	June 27, 2006
Keiichi goes to the Hojo residence to ascertain Teppei's status. He hears footsteps as he is about to leave. At the residence, he finds Satoko in the bath and in need of medical help. Keiichi takes Satoko to the clinic, but overhears the police that Irie committed suicide with sleeping pills, and Oishi has gone missing. Keiichi admits to Satoko that he killed Teppei, but she brushes it off, and leaves. Keiichi then discovers Rika's disemboweled body at the shrine. Satoko discovers Keiichi standing near Rika's body and holding an axe, believing he killed her. She runs away and Keiichi chases after her, saying that he did not kill her. They arrive at a bridge, where Satoko trips over. Keiichi continues to plead his innonence. Satoko believes that Keiichi is possessed by Oyashiro, and that her family member's deaths were supposedly divine punishment for having Rika take the blame for Satoko accidentally damaging Oyashiro's statue inside the ritual shed years ago and abandoning her. Keiichi tries to convince Satoko otherwise, but she pushes him off a bridge. Keiichi hangs on to a cable, and falls after Satoko violently shakes the cables, with her last words to Keiichi being "fall". As Keiichi falls, the last thing he wishes for is the death of Hinamizawa. After, a television broadcasts a news report on a disaster in Hinamizawa, where poisonous volcanic gas erupted, killing everyone in the village except for Keiichi, who survived and was hospitalized.
14	"Hinamizawa (Chapter: Time Wasting, Part 1)"; Transliteration: "Himatsubushi-hen Sono Ichi – Hinamizawa" (Japanese: 暇潰し編 其の壱 ヒナミザワ)	Yūji Hiraki	Toshifumi Kawase	July 4, 2006
Five years ago during the dam project protest, Mamoru Akasaka, a Police Detective from Tokyo, investigates the kidnapping of Toshiki Inukai, the grandson of the dam's construction project manager, with the possibility the anti-dam protesters are responsible for it while going undercover. He meets Oishi, who tells him about the Dam Project Opposition Committee, the three great families, one of them being the Sonozaki family, who hold absolute power. The head of the family, Oryō Sonozaki, is the leader of the anti-dam movement. As the village tourist, he meets and befriends Rika. But all of a sudden, her personality suddenly changes to a stern young woman's who warns him to return to Tokyo, but collapses and commences to act normally afterward. A colleague of Oishi gives intel to Akasaka about the project, headed by Oryō. He learns that the confidential information regarding the missing child had already leaked out to the public and Oryō already knows that a novice police investigator was dispatched to the village. She has given orders to take care of him, if he begins to meddle too much into their affairs. The next day, Ōishi informs Akasaka that a wallet with the same name as the missing child was given to the station as a lost and found item in a deserted village called Takatsudo.
15	"Sign (Chapter: Time Wasting, Part 2)"; Transliteration: "Himatsubushi-hen Sono Ni – Kizashi" (Japanese: 暇潰し編 其の弐 兆し)	Takeshi Yoshimoto	Toshifumi Kawase	July 11, 2006
On their way to Takatsudo, Akasaka notices Rika staring sadly at the car. As Oishi drives in, they find the kidnapper's hideout after a tip-off from Irie and rescue Toshiki, but Akasaka is shot in his left shoulder by one of them. They discover that their efforts were in vain because the perpetrator's demands had already been met. Akasaka tries to contact his pregnant wife, Yukie using the phones at the hospital and out on the streets, but all the cords have been cut. At a particular phone booth, he finds Rika and asks if she cut the cords. She replies that making a call would make him sad. She takes him to see the festival and an ominous Rika describes each deaths starting from 1979 every year and that the last one in 1983 will be her own death. She suggests he will survive, but also live a happy life. A few years later, Akasaka visits Oishi at his mother's birthplace in Hokkaido, and reveals what Rika told him on the night several years ago. He corroborates the story with the events of his pregnant wife, Yukie, who died falling down a stairway at the hospital while he was in Hinamizawa, but fortunately their child Miyuki survived. Oishi tells him that on the day of the disaster, Rika was killed after she was incapacitated with chloroform then had her internal organs horrifically removed from her body. Akasaka reveals that he returned to find the truth about the curse that took Rika.
16	"First Love (Chapter: Eye Opening, Part 1)"; Transliteration: "Meakashi-hen Sono Ichi – Hatsukoi" (Japanese: 目明し編 其の壱 初恋)	Hisakazu Ishikawa	Rika Nakase	July 18, 2006
The events from Watanagashi-hen are retold from Shion's point of view. For generations, the Sonozaki family had to euthanize the younger of the newborn twins to quell misfortunes upon them. Shion was about to die, but they instead left her under her bodyguard Kasai's care then as she grew up as a teenager, they sent her to St. Lucia Academy, but she abandoned the Christian boarding school out of distaste for it. Wanting to live on her own, Shion disguises herself as Mion and gets a job at Angel Mort run by her uncle Yoshirou, with Kasai, and Mion supporting the illusion. Shion learns about the incidents. She meets Satoshi after saving her from delinquents who are about to beat her up and mistake her for Mion. Shion takes a liking to Satoshi and learns that Satoko's parents were victims of the curse who worked at the dam and after that Satoshi and Satoko were taken in by their aunt and uncle. They resent them because the rest of the village shunned them for their parents' support of the dam. Shion goes to school in Mion's place and attempts to cheer up Satoshi who ignores her. During lunchtime, when Shion beats up and insults Satoko after the latter drops her lunchbox and calls for him, Satoshi stops her. Shion learns that Satoshi despises the Sonozaki family for persecuting his own family for their contributions to building the dam.
17	"Responsibility (Chapter: Eye Opening, Part 2)"; Transliteration: "Meakashi-hen Sono Ni – Kejime" (Japanese: 目明し編 其の弐 ケジメ)	Shunji Yoshida	Rika Nakase	July 25, 2006
After convincing Shion to care of Satoko over the phone, Satoshi kills his aunt with the bat during the festival. Shion while in disguise as Mion is skeptical that he is the culprit but provides an alibi for him when Oishi questions him. In the process, she reveals that she is not Mion and admits she's Shion, the younger twin sister. The family finds her when Oishi examines her story, and she is taken back to their family estate to answer her grandmother, Oryō for the trouble she has caused by involving herself with Satoshi. Shion aggressively protests against the family and proclaims her love for Satoshi, she gets punished by Oryō who tells her that Yoshirou and Kasai are held hostage and then orders her to de-nail three of her fingernails representing herself, Kasai, and Satoshi to atone for the misdeeds she caused with the henchmen and Mion finishing it off. A few days later, Shion reveals her identity to Irie and Oishi notifies Shion that Satoshi had suddenly left the village.
18	"Oni's Blood Line (Chapter: Eye Opening, Part 3)"; Transliteration: "Meakashi-hen Sono San – Oni no Ketsumyaku" (Japanese: 目明し編 其の参 鬼の血脈)	Matsuo Asami	Rika Nakase	August 1, 2006
Shion investigates further into the curse and the murders over the past four years. She meets Takano at the library, who tells her more about the dark past. She explains that the village's name used to be called Onigafuchi, and that according to the god's sacrifice ritual, for each victim there must be an equivalent number of missing people, drowned in the bottomless swamp. This leads Shion to believe Satoshi has been sacrificed by her family, and she feels her demon awaken. After Shion's encounter with Takano, she is visited by Mion at her apartment, she attempts to strangle her but learns that Mion de-nailed herself in the same spots Shion had because she did not want her to take the burden and deter Oryō from taking further actions against Shion and Satoshi before she left. The story skips one year to the present right before the festival. Keiichi meets Shion and learns about Satoshi. As he pets her head, Shion remembers Satoshi and feels depressed over missing him, but suddenly hears his voice. The story further skips forward to where Tomitake, Takano, Keiichi and Shion inspect the ritual tool shrine. Shion is determined to find whoever is responsible for Satoshi's death, but suddenly hears footsteps at the same time. After the festival, Shion wakes up from a hangover and overhears Mion and Oryō discussing the events that had transpired over Takano and Tomitake's deaths and the investigation. Shion attempts to leave in fear of punishment but is caught by Mion.
19	"Revenge (Chapter: Eye Opening, Part 4)"; Transliteration: "Meakashi-hen Sono Yon – Shikaeshi" (Japanese: 目明し編 其の四 仕返し)	Daisuke Tsukushi	Rika Nakase	August 8, 2006
Shion believes that her family is connected to the acts of "spiriting away" people in the village, especially in the case of Satoshi. She tasers Mion and her grandmother which unintentionally kills the latter and imprisons Mion in the dungeon, accusing her of having been implicit about Satoshi's disappearance. Shion pretends to be Mion the next day and confronts Keiichi about the previous encounter, which Keiichi denies it. Shion attends a village council meeting and lures the village head, Kimiyoshi to the estate. She tasers him after he reveals that her "Distinction" (removing fingernails punishment) was so that only Kasai, her uncle, and Shion herself would not be killed, confirming for the sisters and their grandmother did not have Satoshi 'forgiven'.
20	"Cold Hands (Chapter: Eye Opening, Part 5)"; Transliteration: "Meakashi-hen Sono Go – Tsumetai Te" (Japanese: 目明し編 其の伍 冷たい手)	Yūji Hiraki	Rika Nakase	August 15, 2006
Shion tortures Kimiyoshi for information about the previous murders and Satoshi. Shion confronts Rika about the murders at school, leading to a confrontation between the two. Rika invites herself to the Sonozaki estate, asking for soy sauce. Inside, Rika attempts to inject Shion with a drug. Rika is tased by Shion, where she takes the drug and injects Rika with it. Rika kills herself by stabbing repeatedly in the head before Shion can torture her. Shion receives a phone call from Satoko and attempts to lure her to the Sonozaki residence.
21	"Condemnation (Chapter: Eye Opening, Part 6)"; Transliteration: "Meakashi-hen Sono Roku – Danzai" (Japanese: 目明し編 其の六 断罪)	Shakyo Mujin	Rika Nakase	August 22, 2006
Shion tricks the townspeople into identifying Keiichi as a suspect. She quickly realizes Oishi suspects her instead. She brutally tortures Satoko for indirectly causing Satoshi's disappearance, which she acknowledges and screams in defiance. She kills Satoko, then she remembers one of Satoshi's last requests was to keep Satoko safe. This drives her deeper into madness. The next day, Keiichi and Rena suspect Mion as Rika and Satoko's killer. Shion then lures Keiichi to the dungeon and prepares to torture him. Keiichi begs Shion, whom he believes is Mion possessed by Oyashiro, to spare the sisters, which makes Shion sad, and she tasers Keiichi. Shion frees Mion, switches clothes with her and takes her to the body disposal well, telling her that Satoshi's body is down there. Mion tells her that their grandmother approved of her relationship with Satoshi, but Shion refuses to believe her. She then tasers Mion, causing her to fall down the well to her death. She and Keiichi are rescued. Following the incident, Shion starts to hallucinate. She visits Keiichi and stabs him. Shion hastily returns to her apartment and scales the side of the building, but falls to her death. As she falls, Shion imagines seeing Satoshi's face in the moon, she apologizes to him for all her unforgivable sins she caused with her own hands.
22	"Happiness (Chapter: Atonement, Part 1)"; Transliteration: "Tsumihoroboshi-hen Sono Ichi – Shiawase" (Japanese: 罪滅し編 其の壱 幸せ)	Daisuke Tsuji	Toshifumi Kawase	August 29, 2006
The timeline is reset yet again. The chapter starts off with Rena and Keiichi winning the water-gun competition. Mion, Satoko and Rika plan to work the day at the Angel Mort Cafe, after losing the game. There, Rena meets Mamiya Rina. Rena recalls the past about the divorce of her parents, because her mother planned to marry another man. Back home, Rena learns Rina has helped her dad completely redo the entire living room, discarding properties, including Kenta-kun, the mascot statue of a fast food restaurant chain, KCF that she and Keiichi salvaged from the landfill. The next day at a cafe, Rena notices and overhears Rina and Teppei Hōjō conducting a shady loan deal with two guys and machinates a plan to steal money from her father in order to save it for marriage. She learns from Shion and Kasai who also visits the cafe about their badger games: beating up a person to extort money from them by having Rina involves herself with a man in a seductive relationship while Teppei 'discovers' and harms them.
23	"Place to Return (Chapter: Atonement, Part 2)"; Transliteration: "Tsumihoroboshi-hen Sono Ni – Kaeru Tokoro" (Japanese: 罪滅し編 其の弐 還る処)	Tomoko Hiramuki	Toshifumi Kawase	September 5, 2006
Rena goes through her father's checkbook and discovers he's overspending extreme amounts of money and realizes Rina must be responsible for it. After school, Rena receives a visit from Rina but she leaves her be and walks to the landfill deliberately letting the latter stalk her there, then confronts Rina for scheming a plan to pilfer the money. When Rina reveals her aggressive true front and attempts to choke Rena to death, she kills her by slicing her stomach open with a glass shard and beating her with a metal pipe. That night, Rena discovers Teppei beating her father outside the house. Rena leads Teppei to the landfill, where she ambushes and kills him. The next day, Rena cuts their bodies into pieces and wraps them up in small packages. Her friends accidentally come across her because they assume she was looking for treasures and wants to join in forgiving her after understanding her circumstances. They dump the packages into a small cave in the woods. When Rena leaves, Mion tells the rest of them to forget the incident. Keiichi, Rika, Satoko, Mion, and Rena then arrive at the Cotton Drifting Festival, where Oishi is seen to be observing them.
24	"Document 34 (Chapter: Atonement, Part 3)"; Transliteration: "Tsumihoroboshi-hen Sono San – Sanjūyon-gō Bunsho" (Japanese: 罪滅し編 其の参 34号文書)	Matsuo Asami	Toshifumi Kawase	September 12, 2006
While reading Takano's scrapbooks, Rena discovers the truth about Oyashiro and his curse. It was proposed that Oyashiro was actually a doctor and the curse was a virus in the village for which he quarantined the village and used the people who died by the virus to make a vaccine which was inadvertently interpreted by villagers. Since the altitude and temperature are very specific for the survival of the virus, the victims start to feel homesick when they leave there. The disease apparently caused all the murders. Rena gets hunted down by people who will stop at nothing to keep the information secret.
25	"Earth Invasion (Chapter: Atonement, Part 4)"; Transliteration: "Tsumihoroboshi-hen Sono Yon – Chikyū Shinryaku" (Japanese: 罪滅し編 其の四 地球侵略)	Yūji Hiraki	Toshifumi Kawase	September 19, 2006
Rena learns that Mion took the packages from where they were hidden, making her lose faith in her friends and causing her sanity to slip. Keiichi learns from Mion about the packages to make sure the forestry service cannot find them when they are going to deforest during the summer. Keiichi goes to the landfill where Rena is hiding, and tries to stop her from committing more crimes as extreme measures, but she confronts him with a dark secret from his past that she learnt from Oishi; Back in his hometown, Keiichi had used a BB gun to hurt children and his conscience made him turn himself in to his parents, and was let off with good behavior probation. Rena claims he is not her friend because friends don't hide things from each other, and leaves him while he is crestfallen. At school, out of guilt, he confesses to the Club members about his past. They forgive him as they believe Keiichi is a good person now, and that it was unnecessary for him to reveal the past. This ultimately makes him remember the events of the first arc, where his paranoia and insanity caused him to kill Rena and Mion when he mistakenly believed them to be a threat. Keiichi breaks down in tears, Rika reacts thunderstruck and later tells him nobody remembers the murders except her, and she forgives him. This strengthens his understanding of Rena's situation and he resolves to prevent the tragedy from occurring. He apologizes to Mion, much to her confusion.
26	"Retake (Chapter: Atonement, Part 5)"; Transliteration: "Tsumihoroboshi-hen Sono Go – Riteiku" (Japanese: 罪滅し編 其の伍 リテイク)	Chiaki Kon	Toshifumi Kawase	September 26, 2006
Rena suddenly appears at school, captures all students, and threatens to kill them by spreading gallons of gasoline around the whole classroom. Keiichi is given the task of handing over Takano's scrapbooks to Oishi, and is given an earpiece and defensive spray secretly in return. With Rika and Satoko's help, he covertly escapes Rena's grasp and learns that she has concocted another plan to use a homemade bomb planted on the school roof as a backup in case her first plan fails. He is discovered by Rena, and Rika arrives to distract her. Keiichi arrives on the roof in time to defuse the bomb. Keiichi and Rena then fight on the rooftop. When Keiichi is left defenseless, she is unable to kill him as she regains her sanity. She then reconciles with her friends. Though the crisis has been averted, Rika is called by Oishi to his car and informs her about Takano and Tomitake's death. She suddenly says she will play with it during the endless June.

=== Higurashi no Naku Koro ni: Nekogoroshi-hen (2007) ===
No.	Title	Directed by	Written by	Original release date
27	"Cat Killing Chapter"; Transliteration: "Nekogoroshi-hen" (Japanese: 猫殺し編)	Chiaki Kon	Toshifumi Kawase	July 27, 2007
After losing a bet, Keiichi and his friends wander around town. They visit the abandoned village of Yagouchi and learn about a strange haunted quarry.

=== When They Cry: Kai (2007) ===
No. overall	No. in season	Title	Directed by	Written by	Original release date
28	1	"Reunion"; Transliteration: "Saikai" (Japanese: サイカイ)	Shunji Yoshida	Toshifumi Kawase	July 6, 2007
Mamoru Akasaka, Ōishi and the assistant visit the abandoned village in 2007. They learn about the Great Hinamizawa Disaster that decimated the town and the connection to Takano's File No. 34. The adult Rena survived the disaster, because she was detained at the police station during the incident. She shares with them the little knowledge she has about Rika's strange behavior shortly before the supposed "gas leak". Akasaka recalls the meeting with Rika. The episode is a direct epilogue of Tsumihoroboshi-hen.
29	2	"Disaster Awakening Chapter One – Playing Tag"; Transliteration: "Yakusamashi-hen Sono Ichi – Onigokko" (Japanese: 厄醒し編 其の壱 鬼ごっこ)	Chiaki Kon	Fumihiko Shimo	July 13, 2007
Back in 1983, the club participates in a game of "zombie tag". On their way home, they run into Irie, Tomitake and Takano, who tell Keiichi about the murders. He understands why his friends hid it from him and does not resent them for it. This fails to reassure Rika, and she grows progressively more depressed as the day of the festival approaches. Satoko utters a phrase spoken by Keiichi during the previous event.
30	3	"Disaster Awakening Chapter Two – Powerless"; Transliteration: "Yakusamashi-hen Sono Ni – Muryoku" (Japanese: 厄醒し編 其の弐 無力)	Makoto Sokuza	Masashi Suzuki	July 20, 2007
Satoko attempts to help Rika, but she denies that anything is wrong. That night, Satoko discovers Rika arguing with a mysterious voice and telling her she will die, and that there is nothing that either of them can do.
31	4	"Disaster Awakening Chapter Three – Pre-established Harmony"; Transliteration: "Yakusamashi-hen Sono San – Yotei Chōwa" (Japanese: 厄醒し編 其の参 予定調和)	Daisuke Tsukushi	Rika Nakase	July 27, 2007
During the festival, Rika fails to warn Tomitake of his imminent death. Satoko is convinced that a mysterious man is following her and Rika around. Worried of her safety, Satoko sets traps around the house to alert her of any intruders, and when one is triggered, her fears are confirmed.
32	5	"Disaster Awakening Chapter Four – The Great Hinamizawa Disaster"; Transliteration: "Yakusamashi-hen Sono Yon – Hinamizawa Daisaigai" (Japanese: 厄醒し編 其の四 雛見沢大災害)	Yūji Hiraki	Toshifumi Kawase	August 3, 2007
After discovering Rika's body near the shrine, a traumatized Satoko flees and falls off the bridge. She stumbles back into town in the aftermath of the Great Hinamizawa Disaster. Satoko suffers mental shock, after witnessing many deaths. Ōishi tries to interrogate with the catatonic Satoko, relaying a cryptic message left by Rena with the motive behind the suspects. Satoko regains consciousness and finds a message, but the suspects kill her.
33	6	"Massacre Chapter One – Rules of the Labyrinth"; Transliteration: "Minagoroshi-hen Sono Ichi – Meiro no Hōsoku" (Japanese: 皆殺し編 其の壱 迷路の法則)	Makoto Sokuza	Fumihiko Shimo	August 10, 2007
Rika begins a new world with Hanyū. She is getting tired of seeing her friends commit the same acts that lead them to her mistake. Keiichi proves to her that people can change their fate if they want during the game tournament, by requesting to play a different game other than the card game played in Watanagashi-hen. He gives the doll to Mion instead of Rena, thereby avoiding hurting her feelings and potentially avoiding the tragedy transpiring in Meakashi-hen. Rika believes the world may be different and vows to fight one more time.
34	7	"Massacre Chapter Two – How to Change Destiny"; Transliteration: "Minagoroshi-hen Sono Ni – Unmei no Kaekata" (Japanese: 皆殺し編 其の弐 運命の変え方)	Yūsuke Onoda	Masashi Suzuki	August 17, 2007
Influenced by Keiichi's encouragement, and the fact her friends are starting to avoid doing the same mistakes by remembering glimpses of what they could have done, Rika decides to find a way to prevent her own ominous destiny. Notable changes in this world that Rika notices includes how Rena actually confided in Mion about the situation, between her dad and Rina rather than bear the burden of her situation by herself, how Ōishi actually gets along with the others, and that Akasaka's wife and son survived after Rika warned the latter.
35	8	"Massacre Chapter Three – Fluctuation"; Transliteration: "Minagoroshi-hen Sono San – Yuragi" (Japanese: 皆殺し編 其の参 揺らぎ)	Daisuke Tsukushi	Fumihiko Shimo	August 24, 2007
Rika's plan is hindered by the appearance of Teppei, who is abusing Satoko. Keiichi and his friends find a way to release Satoko, but the government is reluctant to cooperate.
36	9	"Massacre Chapter Four – Negotiation"; Transliteration: "Minagoroshi-hen Sono Yon – Kōshō" (Japanese: 皆殺し編 其の四 交渉)	Makoto Sokuza	Masashi Suzuki	August 31, 2007
The townspeople protest alongside the others to ignite government action in the case. Satoko cannot leave the house while Teppei is around. This continues to place the action at an impasse. Satoko returns to school and shows the evidence, before being sent to the clinic. After visiting there, Ōishi advises Keiichi not to overextend the issue, informing them that the household is having the situation by the Child Counseling Center. During the meeting, Rika realizes that she is having responsibility.
37	10	"Massacre Chapter Five – Confrontation"; Transliteration: "Minagoroshi-hen Sono Go – Taiketsu" (Japanese: 皆殺し編 其の伍 対決)	Shunji Yoshida	Rika Nakase	September 7, 2007
Keiichi and his friends visit Oryō. Keiichi struggles to take the council and make an appeal for the government. Citizens from Okinomiya and Hinamizawa protest in front of the center, calling for action from the director. The government succumbs to the pressure of everyone and the phone call is connected to the Hōjō residence. Teppei attempts to steal the bank account book from the room.
38	11	"Massacre Chapter Six – Strong Will"; Transliteration: "Minagoroshi-hen Sono Roku – Tsuyoi Ishi" (Japanese: 皆殺し編 其の六 強い意志)	Akira Iwanaga	Toshifumi Kawase	September 14, 2007
Satoko talks to Keiichi and Rika on the phone, revealing the past about the abuse. Teppei is caught and arrested by the police, while Satoko reunites with Rika. Knowing that Tomitake and Takano will die on the night in all of the other worlds she has been in, Rika enlists the help of Ōishi and her friends to protect the two. Once they arrive safely at the clinic, it is revealed that Takano is the head of the clinic and Yamainu's security forces, who faked her death and killed Tomitake for the purpose of reigniting the curse. As the police investigate the case, Takano reflects on how "everything will fall" soon.
39	12	"Massacre Chapter Seven – Hinamizawa Syndrome"; Transliteration: "Minagoroshi-hen Sono Nana – Hinamizawa Shōkōgun" (Japanese: 皆殺し編 其の七 雛見沢症候群)	Hodaka Kuramoto	Fumihiko Shimo	September 25, 2007
Rika tells her friends the details of the Hinamizawa Syndrome, regarding how the disease whose symptoms show up when one tries to leave the village. Rika reveals that the clinic, was actually an establishment built to research the disease, or more specifically gather information on how to harness it as a biological weapon, sponsored by various bureaucratic connections collectively referred to as "Tokyo". The Yamainu are revealed to be a security force tasked with maintaining the secrecy of such an operation. Irie is revealed to be innocent in the matter and works at the institute, but his actual intentions were to find a cure for the syndrome rather than developing a biological weapon. Rika revealed that her family lineage has been referred to "Queen Carrier" that have suppressed the onset of symptoms of the syndrome, and thus she is targeted by the military. Her friends believe her without hesitation. The police are stationed, at Rika's request, around the residence to give her added protection. The military forces kill Ōishi and his assistant at the radio tower.
40	13	"Massacre Chapter Eight – Finale"; Transliteration: "Minagoroshi-hen Sono Hachi – Shūmatsu" (Japanese: 皆殺し編 其の八 終末)	Daisuke Tsukushi	Masashi Suzuki	October 1, 2007
Keiichi, Rena, Mion and Shion leave the house to the officers for the night. As Satoko sleeps, Rika talks with Hanyū about Rika's fate. Meanwhile, the military disables the guards at Rika's house and infiltrate the residence, but Rika and Satoko escape. They are cornered by the group in the forest at one point, but Mion, Shion, Rena and Keiichi come to rescue them after knowing they are in danger. The six of them failed to reach the household, after Takano killed the others. She brings and finally kills Rika at the shrine. The spirits of the group members along with Hanyū, meet and agree that Hanyuu too must have the will to break the cycle of death. Meanwhile, the villagers die succumbing to the gas, while an ecstatic Takano proclaims her ascension to godhood.
41	14	"Festival Accompanying Chapter One – Miyo"; Transliteration: "Matsuribayashi-hen Sono Ichi – Miyo" (Japanese: 祭囃し編 其の壱 三四)	Hideki Takayama	Toshifumi Kawase	October 8, 2007
In a series of flashbacks, Takano's parents were killed in a bus accident and all of her relatives died in the war. Dr. Hifumi (Takano's foster grandfather) and his research piqued her interest in biological parasites when she was young. Takano and the others suffered verbal and physical abuse at the orphanage. After separating them, Takano escapes from the orphanage headmaster into the forest. Years later, Takano continues the research, working at the institute as second in command behind Irie. Takano meets Tomitake. Back in the past, Takano questions the god why she is suffering for her abnormal life. The flashback ends and Takano wakes up, apparently dreaming the entire time. Takano looks over the village and proclaims that her actions continues on with her grandfather's legacy.
42	15	"Festival Accompanying Chapter Two – Wriggling"; Transliteration: "Matsuribayashi-hen Sono Ni – Ugomeki" (Japanese: 祭囃し編 其の弐 蠢き)	Akira Iwanaga	Rika Nakase	October 15, 2007
Takano manages to contact Hifumi at a phone booth, while escaping from the orphanage and pleading for help before the call ends. Takano was recaptured and returned to the orphanage, but she was soon taken in by Hifumi. Takano becomes an assistant for organizing the research on the syndrome in preparation for a presentation among peers of their colleague, Koizumi. Hifumi's research is rejected and even mocked by the intellectuals during the presentation, fueling young Takano's determination to continue his research and make her grandfather a "god". Takano later graduated with high honors and joined an intellectual society which could financially support her research. A few years later, Takano visits the shrine and confronts Hanyū, who is determined to challenge the fate of the village against the research.
43	16	"Festival Accompanying Chapter Three – The Beginning of the End"; Transliteration: "Matsuribayashi-hen Sono San – Owari no Hajimari" (Japanese: 祭囃し編 其の参 終わりの始まり)	Yūsuke Onoda	Rika Nakase	October 22, 2007
The events of the dam incident are shown, including when the Hōjō family antagonized against the Sonozaki family and village residents. It is revealed that the dam construction manager was killed by employees when he sees them drinking after work and went on a rampage. Meanwhile, Takano and Irie had been researching the syndrome at the institute, but they needed a live specimen to prove the linkage between a parasite and the onset of the syndrome. They eventually utilized one of the construction workers (who were succumbed to psychosis) responsible for killing the construction manager as a live specimen. In another flashback, Satoshi discusses with Irie regarding how he wants Satoko to stay at the clinic longer than spending time their aunt, simultaneously lifting a burden off of himself. During these events, Hanyū feels helpless and apologetic, but years later she and Rika eagerly await the arrival of the one person as the key to bring an end to the intention.
44	17	"Festival Accompanying Chapter Four – Strategy"; Transliteration: "Matsuribayashi-hen Sono Yon – Bōryaku" (Japanese: 祭囃し編 其の四 謀略)	Daisuke Tsukushi	Masashi Suzuki	October 29, 2007
In order to save Satoko from being infected, Rika offers herself as a test subject for Irie and Takano's research, since Rika's status as a "Queen Carrier" and its suppression of the syndrome allows the drugs to be derived from her blood. Takano prepares a plan to cover up the gassing of Hinamizawa residents as a natural disaster. Ōishi tells Irie that Satoko inadvertently killed her parents by pushing them off the cliff near the dam. While Rika was at the Institution, her parents objected to the continued use of the latter, and thus Takano utilized the curse to cover up the death of Rika's parents that year. The clinic faces closure since treatments had been developed by Irie to combat the syndrome, despite Takano's wishes to continue research for the sake of her late grandfather. Takano meets Nomura who claims that she can help her attain the goal.
45	18	"Festival Accompanying Chapter Five – The Final Piece"; Transliteration: "Matsuribayashi-hen Sono Go – Saigo no Koma" (Japanese: 祭囃し編 其の伍 最後の駒)	Yūji Hiraki	Toshifumi Kawase	November 5, 2007
Ichiro visits an open plot of land in preparation of moving his family into the village, and meets Rika and Hanyū. Rena's mother abandoned the family. After purchasing a teddy bear, Satoshi succumbs to the syndrome and is sent to the clinic after realizing he killed his aunt. Keiichi soon enters the school, as Rika and Hanyū look on, proclaiming that all the pieces have united for the impending struggle against destiny.
46	19	"Festival Accompanying Chapter Six – Opening"; Transliteration: "Matsuribayashi-hen Sono Roku – Makuake" (Japanese: 祭囃し編 其の六 幕開け)	Chiaki Kon	Fumihiko Shimo	November 12, 2007
Hanyū is introduced into the world as a transfer school student. She recalls Takano when she met her, and learns that her military forces are the culprits behind the attack. Hanyu tells this to Rika, who has seemingly lost her memories from Minagoroshi-hen. Hanyū also discloses her own backstory as a former god of the local land. Akasaka returns to the village to investigate Rika's clairvoyance and her connection to the curse, and recruits Ōishi. Irie discloses "Emergency Manual #34" to Rika, which states that the sudden death of the "Queen Carrier" will lead to the gassing of the citizens before they can succumb to the symptoms. Rika tries to decode the reason why Takano would try to kill her and recruits her friends, by analogizing her situation to the plot of a manga she is writing. Mion suggests that opposing factions of a secret society may be contending for power. Meanwhile, Takano becomes the head member of a new research facility and reveals her plan to defeat Koizumi's faction.
47	20	"Festival Accompanying Chapter Seven – Trap"; Transliteration: "Matsuribayashi-hen Sono Nana – Torappu" (Japanese: 祭囃し編 其の七 トラップ)	Yūsuke Onoda	Fumihiko Shimo	November 19, 2007
Rika, Ōishi and Akasaka identify Takano as the culprit to Irie and Tomitake, and eventually enlists the help of Tomitake to gather incriminating evidence in the shadows. Rika asserts to Ōishi that the Sonozaki family is not behind the annual murder mysteries. She later reveals to her friends the truth of her intended murder, and they manage to boost each other's morale to confront Takano's willpower together. Rika ponders that her experiences in past worlds were used after all, as it seems her friends have inherently learned from their past mistakes. Keiichi and Satoko devise a plan to save Rika as an effort to debunk the validity of "Emergency Manual #34". Meanwhile, Irie is still skeptical of Takano's intentions, but his suspicions are confirmed when he visits Akasaka, who is stationed at Rika's house to appear as if Rika and Satoko are in the residence. Rika and her friends attempt to enlist the help of Ōishi to make a police announcement, but Ōishi is hesitant at first. Tomitake learns of Takano's connection with Koizumi, and her monetary connections with the military. Irie and Ōishi are surprised to learn that many village elders have laid down past conflicts and now preach peace with the Hōjō family. Ōishi enlists the help of his friends to carry out about Rika.
48	21	"Festival Accompanying Chapter Eight – 48 Hours"; Transliteration: "Matsuribayashi-hen Sono Hachi – Yonjū-hachi Jikan" (Japanese: 祭囃し編 其の八 48時間)	Yūji Hiraki	Masashi Suzuki	November 26, 2007
Oblivious of Tomitake and Irie's betrayal, Takano continues on with her plan. Ōishi confirms with Rika and her friends that the local precinct is on board with the announcement of Rika's death, set to be announced at dawn. The grand plan is named "Operation 48 Hours". The next day, Takano's military forces are sent into a scramble over the validity of the report. Meanwhile, Ōishi and his associates deal with an organization spy, Otaka, who plans to come and investigate Rika's future. Okonogi realizes that they are being attacked by an organized plan. The group attempts to apprehend Tomitake, who they trace as a source of calls with the Investigation Bureau, to prevent a leakage of the operation. Otaka arrives at the precinct and claims to have the backing of the councilor, but he is on-site and dispels such a claim. Meanwhile, Takano learns about Rika, becoming suspicious of Irie and the group captures Tomitake.
49	22	"Festival Accompanying Chapter Nine – Offense and Defense"; Transliteration: "Matsuribayashi-hen Sono Kyū – Kōbō" (Japanese: 祭囃し編 其の九 攻防)	Yoshihisa Matsumoto	Rika Nakase	December 3, 2007
When Tomitake is sent to the clinic, Irie escapes from there. As Irie reunites with Shion and Kasai, they inadvertently lead the group to Rika's hideout, using a transmitter. As the group arrive at the estate and hide in the tunnel, Shion and Kasai pretend to be unconscious. When the military threatens to drop Shion down there, Rika decides to surrender herself in exchange for their safety. Before Okonogi breaks the deal, Akasaka saves Rika, impersonating a soldier and driving the others away. While Keiichi and friends plan for the next counterattack, Irie tells Shion that Satoshi is alive at the clinic.
50	23	"Festival Accompanying Chapter Ten – Bloody Battle"; Transliteration: "Matsuribayashi-hen Sono Jū – Kessen" (Japanese: 祭囃し編 其の拾 血戦)	Keitarō Motonaga	Masashi Suzuki	December 10, 2007
Takano interrogates with Tomitake, but is informed about Rika and takes command of the group to capture the others. When the soldiers arrive at the mountains, Satoko set various traps for them. While Kasai and Akasaka infiltrate the underground clinic, Shion and Irie find Satoshi at the experimental cell. Despite his health, Irie vows to continue his research in order to save Satoshi. Irie convinces Shion to keep their evidence as a secret. The soldiers are sent into a state of disarray, when they hear a god-like voice over the radio apparently torturing them, revealed to be the impersonating voices of Hanyū and Keiichi. Takano attempts to rally the soldiers, but Akasaka drives a van near a blockade on the road.
51	24	"Festival Accompanying Chapter Eleven – End"; Transliteration: "Matsuribayashi-hen Sono Jūichi – Oshimai" (Japanese: 祭囃し編 其の拾壱 オシマイ)	Chiaki Kon	Toshifumi Kawase	December 17, 2007
Akasaka and Tomitake break through the blockade and make it to the city, where they dispatched the Banken combat unit and convince the soldiers of Yamainu to surrender. After learning that Nomura used her as a scapegoat, Takano decides to surrender and is sent to the clinic for treatment. Keiichi and his friends attend the festival. After the credits, Frederica Bernkastel (the aggregate consciousness of all incarnations of Rika across the "restarts") changes the future by saving Takano's parents.

=== When They Cry: Rei (2009) ===
No. overall	No. in season	Title	Directed by	Original release date
52	1	"Embarrassment Chapter"; Transliteration: "Hajisarashi-hen" (Japanese: 羞晒し編)	Shunji Yoshida	February 25, 2009
After forgetting to pack his bathing suit and before entering the water park, Keiichi wears a pair of swim trunks containing the magical ability to make women attracted to whoever writes their name. Mion hears from her uncle that Keiichi wrote his name on the suit and he will fall in love by himself. After most failed attempts, the girls convince Tomitake, Ōishi and Irie to remove the suit from Keiichi. While the three fight for it, the naked Keiichi refuses to wear the spare one.
53	2	"Dice Killing Chapter One"; Transliteration: "Saikoroshi-hen Sono Ichi" (Japanese: 賽殺し編 其の壱)	Shun Yashiro	March 25, 2009
With the village reverted to normal, Rika spends a new life. While biking with her friends, Rika is apparently killed by an oncoming truck. She finds herself in the alternate timeline, without Keiichi, Takano, Irie and Hanyū. Her friends do not remember the events that occurred in the previous world. The dam project threatening to flood the town is still underway and none of the tragedies she witnessed countless times happened at all, meaning Satoshi and his parents are alive. For the first time in her story, Rika cannot return to her own timeline.
54	3	"Dice Killing Chapter Two"; Transliteration: "Saikoroshi-hen Sono Ni" (Japanese: 賽殺し編 其の弐)	Shunji Yoshida	May 22, 2009
Rika makes contact with Hanyū, who tells her that for her to return to her old world, she must dispose a piece from the world that prevents Hanyū from entering the new one. This is what prevents Rika from reincarnating. If the piece turns out to be a person, for instance, she must kill someone. She discovers the item which would send her back to her own world. The next day, Rika reprimands Satoko for insulting her. Later, Rika experiences what life with a mother is like, and begins building a new friendship with Mion, Rena, Satoshi and Satoko. Rika now feels it is all a matter of deciding which world she would rather like to stay in, until her mother reveals as the previous reincarnation of Oyashiro.
55	4	"Dice Killing Chapter Three"; Transliteration: "Saikoroshi-hen Sono San" (Japanese: 賽殺し編 其の参)	Shun Yashiro	June 16, 2009
Rika becomes torn between remaining in a world without sin and where everyone is living contently, or killing her mother and returning to her old world. She learns that she does not have time to act. Rika decides to fight for what she wants to live for. The next thing she knows, she awakens from a coma in her own world and reunites with her friends, the other world having apparently been a dream. Rika concludes that she killed her mother to regain consciousness. Unbeknownst to her, the dream was developed by Hanyū to teach Rika that people need to work past personal hardships in order to make life worth living.
56	5	"Daybreak Chapter"; Transliteration: "Hirukowashi-hen" (Japanese: 昼壊し編)	Shunji Yoshida	August 21, 2009
Rena swallows the "Fuwarazu Magatama" at the picnic, when it fell from the sky and begins acting lovesick. Rika explains that the seal on the magatama was broken, and whoever possesses the red one will fall blindly in love with anyone holding the white counterpart. Everyone reasons that Rena must have swallowed the red magatama and sets out to stop her and find the white one. It winds up in the possession of Tomitake, Takano and Ōishi, each of whom gradually come to accept her love under the curse. As Keiichi and Akasaka defeat Rena and Ōishi in mahjong, Ōishi fumbles the magatama and Keiichi swallows it. Rika lifts the curse, before Keiichi can fall under the power and Rena returns to normal. Rena becomes grateful and expresses her feelings toward Keiichi, though she is not sure if it is part of the magatama. Tomitake and Takano are infatuated with Rena.

=== Higurashi no Naku Koro ni Kira (2011–12) ===
No. overall	No. in season	Title	Directed by	Written by	Original release date
57	1	"Penalty Loving Chapter"; Transliteration: "Batsukoishi-hen" (Japanese: 罰恋し編)	Toshiyuki Katō	Toshifumi Kawase	July 21, 2011
In a parody of the first season, Tomitake, Irie, Ōishi and the girls play the punishment game, after Keiichi loses. He falls asleep while the girls speculate the game. Keiichi and Takano are nearly infected by the syndrome. When the girls threaten Keiichi, he wakes up and sees the men.
58	2	"Demon Battling Chapter"; Transliteration: "Ayakashisenshi-hen" (Japanese: 妖戦し編)	Masahiro Sonoda	Fumihiko Shimo	September 22, 2011
In a parallel world, Rika and Satoko become magical girls. They defeat four generals of Tokyo Magika (Teppei, Takano, Okonogi and Nomura), and lift the curse.
59	3	"Affinity Chapter"; Transliteration: "Musubienishi-hen" (Japanese: 結縁し編)	Toshiyuki Katō	Toshifumi Kawase	November 23, 2011
A love rectangle between Keiichi and the girls ensues, as they compete for his affection through many methods. They decide to pick whom Keiichi will accompany, but he inadvertently picks Oryō.
60	4	"Dream Appearing Chapter"; Transliteration: "Yumeutsushi-hen" (Japanese: 夢現し編)	Hideki Tachibana	Fumihiko Shimo	January 25, 2012
A young Rika and Hanyū play a game of hide and seek, causing Rika to fall into a time paradox and being trapped in the future. Hanyū finds Rika and offers to help her. She remembers the time she left while playing a game with her. Keiichi and his friends find a way to send Rika back to where she belongs. Hanyū is reluctant at first, thinking back at how much suffering Rika went through. Rika tells Hanyū she wants to return and does so. After sending her younger self back to the past, Rika and Hanyū return to the present day.

=== Higurashi no Naku Koro ni Kaku: Outbreak (2013) ===
No. overall	No. in season	Title	Directed by	Written by	Original release date
61	1	"Higurashi no Naku Koro ni Kaku: Outbreak"; Transliteration: "Higurashi no Naku Koro ni Kaku: Autobureiku" (Japanese: ひぐらしのなく頃に拡 〜アウトブレイク〜)	Toshifumi Kawase	Toshifumi Kawase	August 15, 2013
An unknown virus has spread everywhere and officials force quarantine in the village. When security forces remove everything from the village, the situation becomes abnormal and the locals blame themselves. Irie kills himself after a failed attempt to find a cure against the virus. Keiichi and his friends escape from the village, except Rika.

=== Higurashi: When They Cry – Gou (2020–21) ===
No. overall	No. in season	Title	Directed by	Written by	Original release date
62	1	"Demon-Deceiving Chapter, Part 1"; Transliteration: "Onidamashi-hen Sono Ichi" (Japanese: 鬼騙し編 其の壱)	Hijiri Sanpei	Naoki Hayashi	October 1, 2020
The episode opens with Keiichi killing Rena and Mion with a baseball bat. In present day, Keiichi and his parents moved to the village of Hinamizawa, where he spends his days with his friends and fellow games club members Rena, Mion, Satoko and Rika. He accompanies Rena to retrieve a fast food restaurant mascot statue from the Dam Construction Site. There, Keiichi meets Jiro Tomitake, a wildlife photographer, who tells Keiichi about a grisly murder and dismemberment that had occurred at the site several years ago. Keiichi asks Rena, but she abruptly denies having heard about it. The next day, Rena appears distracted. Keiichi asks Mion about the murder and she also abruptly denies having heard about it. When visiting the Dam Construction Site later, Keiichi comes across an old magazine that covered the murder case, confirming that the incident had happened. Rena appears behind Keiichi with a hatchet while Rika looks on from a distance, her eyes emitting a red glow.
63	2	"Demon-Deceiving Chapter, Part 2"; Transliteration: "Onidamashi-hen Sono Ni" (Japanese: 鬼騙し編 其の弐)	Chikayo Nakamura	Naoki Hayashi	October 8, 2020
An older Rika wakes up in the Sea of Fragments, as Hanyū appears before her. Hanyū tells Rika that she has been brought back to June 1983 for unknown reasons. Though Rika is distraught, she vows to win back the future she and her friends had fought for, armed with the knowledge she has gained from previous worlds. Rika opens her eyes again, returning to the location where she watched Rena and Keiichi at the Dam Construction Site. Keiichi screams and Rena explains that she had brought the hatchet to help them clear debris. The next day, Rena and Keiichi return to the site to get the statue and Keiichi has a vision in which he beats Rena and Mion to death with a baseball bat. Rena, seeming distracted, obtains tarp and rope to wrap the statue and bring it home. Keiichi and his friends attend the annual Watanagashi festival and watch Rika perform a ceremonial dance, while Tomitake and Miyo Takano meet.
64	3	"Demon-Deceiving Chapter, Part 3"; Transliteration: "Onidamashi-hen Sono San" (Japanese: 鬼騙し編 其の参)	Naoyuki Tatsuwa	Naoki Hayashi	October 15, 2020
A day after the festival, Keiichi is questioned by detective Kuraudo Ōishi who tells him that Takano and Tomitake disappeared the night of the festival. Ōishi believes their disappearance is related to a string of mysterious deaths and disappearances known as "the curse of Oyashiro" that have occurred each year on the night of the festival. Keiichi confronts Rena and suggests that she and Mion are keeping secrets from him. Rena's demeanor changes abruptly and she suggests that Keiichi is keeping secrets as well, citing his hiding of the magazine and his secret meetings with Ōishi. That evening, Ōishi calls Keiichi to tell him about Rena's dark past. After the phone call, Keiichi's father arrives, saying that Rena had come over and went up to Keiichi's room a few minutes after the start of the call. Keiichi concludes that Rena was listening in on his phone conversation with Ōishi.
65	4	"Demon-Deceiving Chapter, Part 4"; Transliteration: "Onidamashi-hen Sono Yon" (Japanese: 鬼騙し編 其の四)	Fujiaki Asari	Naoki Hayashi	October 22, 2020
Keiichi becomes suspicious of Rena. Rika encourages Keiichi not to doubt Rena. Keiichi feels guilty and tries to return to normal life. That same evening, his parents leave town for the night, leaving Keiichi alone. Rena comes over to cook dinner for him. As he tries to overcome his suspicions of Rena, Keiichi again sees a vision of him killing Rena and Mion. Keiichi convinces himself that he should not doubt his friends and lets Rena inside. In the kitchen, Keiichi discovers that the bento Rena had brought contains weapons, as she begins clawing at her throat and telling Keiichi that she is cursed by Oyashiro. She declares she will kill Keiichi and disappear, offering the two of them as a sacrifice. She grabs a kitchen knife and stabs Keiichi repeatedly, while he beats her to death with an alarm clock in self defense. Keiichi falls into a coma and wakes up two days later in a hospital. He learns from Mion that Rika and Satoko are dead, although police are unsure if it was a suicide or murder. A strange nurse arrives and asks Keiichi if his neck itches. Keiichi screams while scratching his neck.
66	5	"Cotton-Deceiving Chapter, Part 1"; Transliteration: "Watadamashi-hen Sono Ichi" (Japanese: 綿騙し編 其の壱)	Fujiaki Asari	Keiichirō Kawaguchi	October 29, 2020
Two weeks prior, in a timeline reset, Keiichi and his friends attend a game competition at a game shop owned by the Sonozaki family. As a thank-you gift for bringing business to the shop, the store owner gives dolls to everyone except Mion. Rika hints to Keiichi that he should give his doll to Mion. Keiichi does so. Later, Keiichi and his father have lunch at a cosplay restaurant, Angel Mort. There, Keiichi meets Shion and confuses her for Mion. Keiichi is skeptical of Shion, believing her to be a persona invented by Mion. Shion visits Keiichi with dinner as thanks for giving his doll to Mion. The next day at school, Keiichi hands the empty box back to Mion, who appears flustered. After school, Keiichi arrives at Angel Mort and accidentally knocks over motorcycles belonging to delinquents. They are then surrounded by Shion and the bystanders.
67	6	"Cotton-Deceiving Chapter, Part 2"; Transliteration: "Watadamashi-hen Sono Ni" (Japanese: 綿騙し編 其の弐)	Yonpei	Keiichirō Kawaguchi	November 5, 2020
After scaring off the delinquents, Shion explains to Keiichi that the villagers have a strong sense of community and will band together to fight against anything or anyone that threatens the village. This was largely fostered during the "Dam War", a conflict in which the villagers of Hinamizawa banded together to shut down a planned demolition of the village. Shion asks Keiichi to buy her a doll in a shop window. Once inside, they run into Mion, prompting Keiichi to realize that Mion and Shion are indeed twins. Later, Keiichi learns about "the curse of Oyashiro", the string of annual murders and disappearances. On the night of the festival, Shion convinces Keiichi to sneak into a ritual storehouse with her, Takano and Tomitake.
68	7	"Cotton-Deceiving Chapter, Part 3"; Transliteration: "Watadamashi-hen Sono San" (Japanese: 綿騙し編 其の参)	Chikayo Nakamura	Keiichirō Kawaguchi	November 12, 2020
Inside the storehouse, Takano explains the dark history of the village and its annual festival. Shion inadvertently knocks off the head of a statue of Oyashiro. Afterward, Keiichi lies to Rena, Mion and Rika, saying that he remained at the festival the entire time and did not run into Shion. On his way home, Keiichi runs into Ōishi who questions him about Takano and Tomitake. Keiichi lies and claims not to have seen them, though Ōishi explains that he saw the three of them together with Shion. Shion calls Keiichi to tell him that Tomitake and Takano stole a truck and fled the village together. She believes that they may have been targeted as this year's victims of the curse of Oyashiro, because they trespassed the storehouse. Keiichi panics and blames Shion for forcing him. The next day, they learn that Kimiyoshi, the mayor, has gone missing. Keiichi confesses to Rika about having trespassed the storehouse with Shion, Takano and Tomitake. Rika ominously informs Keiichi that it is too late to do anything about it and that she, Keiichi, and the world are already doomed.
69	8	"Cotton-Deceiving Chapter, Part 4"; Transliteration: "Watadamashi-hen Sono Yon" (Japanese: 綿騙し編 其の四)	Takashi Ikehata	Keiichirō Kawaguchi	November 19, 2020
Rika has disappeared and Satoko suspects Keiichi. However, Mion claims that she saw Rika speaking with some men in construction uniforms. While looking for Rika, Mion, in a frenzy, informs him that she believes Rika is behind the curse of Oyashiro. Later at Mion's house, Keiichi confesses to what happened during the festival. Mion explains that most people already know and think he should be punished. Mion promises to help Keiichi and takes him to her family's underground bunker which once operated as a torture chamber to uphold the strict religious laws of the village. She locks him in a cell, explaining that she wants to protect him, confesses her love to Keiichi, and urges him to explain that he was her victim if anything goes wrong. She takes a gun to fight off intruders. Keiichi tries to break out, but passes out after bashing his head repeatedly against the door. After being rescued and released from the hospital, Ōishi informs Keiichi that Oryo Sonozaki, Kimiyoshi and Shion were found dead at the bottom of a well in the underground bunker. Rika was also found dead in the locked silo, and Mion and Satoko were found dead beside one other at the house. Keiichi questions if Mion protected him or if she was the one who killed them.
70	9	"Curse-Deceiving Chapter, Part 1"; Transliteration: "Tataridamashi-hen Sono Ichi" (Japanese: 祟騙し編 其の壱)	Yasunori Gotō	Naoki Hayashi	November 26, 2020
The timeline is once again reset to one and half weeks before the festival. In this loop, Keiichi makes a bet with the club that he can cook better than Satoko. After an ill-fated attempt at cooking later that night, Satoko and Rika arrive to help. Rika tells Keiichi that Satoko enjoys cooking for him since it reminds her of cooking for her older brother, Satoshi. Keiichi participates in a little league baseball game with the club members. Satoko wins the game for the team and the team's coach, Irie Kyōsuke, prepares a celebratory barbeque. Irie informs Keiichi that Satoko lost her parents in an accident and Satoshi ran away from the village. Mion explains that they avoid talking about it because they are afraid of upsetting Satoko. She says that many villagers believe Satoko's family was cursed by Oyashiro for supporting the dam construction project. Meanwhile, a despondent Satoko is ushered into her house by her abusive uncle, Teppei.
71	10	"Curse-Deceiving Chapter, Part 2"; Transliteration: "Tataridamashi-hen Sono Ni" (Japanese: 祟騙し編 其の弐)	Chikayo Nakamura; Takahiro Majima	Naoki Hayashi	December 3, 2020
Keiichi has a nightmare in which he kills Teppei. At school, Rika informs the class that Satoko will be late. Ōishi questions Keiichi and threatens him when Keiichi refuses to answer. Irie tells him that Satoko and Satoshi were abused by their aunt and uncle. Satoko arrives at school but goes home early. Rika explains that Teppei has returned and Satoko will be living with him. The club members, concerned for Satoko's safety, tell their teacher, Chie. She visits, but is turned away by an irate Teppei. Chie promises to call Child Welfare Services, although Mion explains that the Child Welfare Services may not act unless they have hard proof that Satoko is being abused. The next day, Satoko returns to school and denies being abused. When Keiichi tries to pet her head, she has a mental breakdown remniscient of PTSD.
72	11	"Curse-Deceiving Chapter, Part 3"; Transliteration: "Tataridamashi-hen Sono San" (Japanese: 祟騙し編 其の参)	Oyunamu	Naoki Hayashi	December 10, 2020
As the club members express their frustrations over the inaction of Child Welfare Services, Shion asserts that killing Teppei is the only way they can save Satoko. Keiichi and Rika convince Shion that killing is not the option and elect to visit Child Welfare Services as a group. When the visit is ultimately unsuccessful, Keiichi suggests that they try again with a larger group. After recruiting Chie and the rest of their class, they argue their case to Child Welfare Services. Rika is inspired by Keiichi's determination and believes that they can change fate if they work together.
73	12	"Curse-Deceiving Chapter, Part 4"; Transliteration: "Tataridamashi-hen Sono Yon" (Japanese: 祟騙し編 其の四)	Yasunori Gotō	Naoki Hayashi	December 17, 2020
After another failed attempt to protest outside of the Child Welfare Services office, Keiichi and the others try to convince mayor Kimiyoshi and the village council to support their cause. Despite initial pushback, the village council is impressed by Keiichi's determination and resolve to support him as long as they obtain the approval of Oryo Sonozaki. Keiichi and friends argue with Oryo to help Satoko, even though she is part of the Hōjō family. She ultimately agrees to support their cause, won over by Keiichi's boldness.
74	13	"Curse-Deceiving Chapter, Part 5"; Transliteration: "Tataridamashi-hen Sono Go" (Japanese: 祟騙し編 其の伍)	Fujiaki Asari	Naoki Hayashi	December 24, 2020
Keiichi and friends again arrive outside of the Child Welfare Services office with the support of the Hinamizawa village heads. As the pressure on them becomes too much to bear, Child Welfare Services send the assistant manager to the Hōjō residence, accompanied by Ōishi. Satoko calls Keiichi and explains that she found the courage to admit to her uncle's abuse and Teppei was taken away to the police station. The two look forward to a peaceful life now that Satoko is free from her uncle. On the night of the festival, Satoko tells Keiichi that she has a present for him at her house. When they arrive, Teppei ambushes and wounds Keiichi with a baseball bat. Keiichi retaliates and kills Teppei before passing out. The next day, Keiichi wakes up in a hospital and Rena tells him that Ōishi killed Rika, Satoko, Mion and Shion on the night of the festival.
75	14	"Cat-Deceiving Chapter, Part 1"; Transliteration: "Nekodamashi-hen Sono Ichi" (Japanese: 猫騙し編 其の壱)	Hironori Aoyagi	Naoki Hayashi	January 8, 2021 (Note: From this episode onward, episodes air every Friday at 12:30 a.m. JST, an hour after the original air time on Tokyo MX.)
Ōishi arrives at the festival in a frenzy and kills several villagers. He grabs Rika, claiming that he knows that she is behind the curse of Oyashiro, and kills her with a baseball bat. Rika wakes up in the Sea of Fragments, where Hanyū tells her that she has used the last bit of her power to allow Rika to keep the memories of the hours leading up to her death. Before vanishing, Hanyū tells Rika about a sword hidden inside the statue of Oyashiro in the ritual storehouse that can kill someone living in loops. Having lost hope, Rika awakens in a new world and decides to use the sword to kill herself and end her suffering. As Rika arrives at the storehouse, she finds a broken piece of the sword. After her friends find her there, she changes her mind and decides to give herself five more loops to try to escape her fate before she kills herself.
76	15	"Cat-Deceiving Chapter, Part 2"; Transliteration: "Nekodamashi-hen Sono Ni" (Japanese: 猫騙し編 其の弐)	Toshikatsu Tokoro	Naoki Hayashi	January 15, 2021
Rika and her friends continue to spend time in the village. One day, while the club learns mahjong tricks with Ōishi, Mamoru Akasaka arrives. Rika asks Akasaka to stay in Hinamizawa through the day of the festival to help protect her. He decides to stay for Rika's sake. Some time later, Akasaka is shown stabbing Rika repeatedly and holding her hostage, while Ōishi attempts to negotiate for the police outside. He claims that there are parasites inside his and Rika's bodies and ultimately blows the building up, killing him and Rika in the process. In another loop, Rika is beheaded by Akane Sonozaki who hopes to bring an end to the three families whom she believe are behind the curse of Oyashiro. Another loop shows Kimiyoshi drowning Rika in the Onigafuchi swamp as a way to quell the wrath of Oyashiro. Finally, Rika is beaten to death with a baseball bat by Keiichi at Angel Mort. Before dying, Rika longs to return to her dormitory room at St. Lucia's Academy.
77	16	"Cat-Deceiving Chapter, Part 3"; Transliteration: "Nekodamashi-hen Sono San" (Japanese: 猫騙し編 其の参)	Takahiko Usui	Naoki Hayashi	January 22, 2021
In another loop, Rika wakes up to discover that Satoko has split open her abdomen and exposed her organs. As Satoko begins to use a ritual hoe to rip apart Rika's internal organs, she explains that she has been made the new priestess of Oyashiro, because Rika wished to leave the village. Rika reflects on how she chose to leave the village and attend St. Lucia's Academy after she and her friends defeated Takano and her soldiers. She realizes that the village was not as bad as she remembered it and repents of her desire to leave the village. Satoko hugs Rika and assures her that Oyashiro will forgive her, because she recognized her sin. The timeline resets again, and Rika and Satoko play games with their friends. The next day, Rika tells Satoko that she had been having nightmares that she was being punished for wanting to leave the village, but that she now realizes that she loves the village and wants to stay. Satoko sadly assures Rika that she will not be having any nightmares anymore. Days pass and no tragedies occur: Rena and Keiichi do not become paranoid, Shion and Keiichi do not sneak off to the storehouse, and Teppei does not return to the village. While attending the festival, Rika finds Takano and Tomitake. Takano tells Rika that she wants to speak with her.
78	17	"Cat-Deceiving Chapter, Part 4"; Transliteration: "Nekodamashi-hen Sono Yon" (Japanese: 猫騙し編 其の四)	Yasunori Gotō	Naoki Hayashi	January 29, 2021
Takano apologizes to Rika, confessing that she had planned to kill Rika and her friends. Tomitake explains that Takano had gotten involved in a conspiracy and have decided to flee the village. After Takano turns herself in to the authorities and Tomitake leaves the village, Rika begins to feel suspicious about how perfect the loop has been. She wonders if someone else had decided her fate from the start. She expresses her concerns to Satoko who tells her not to worry. At school, Rika asks Rena, Mion and Keiichi to help her throw a birthday party for Satoko. They each take turns giving Satoko their presents before Rika finally reveals hers. When Satoko sees the box containing Rika's present, she flinches, recognizing it as the trap box from a previous loop. However, Rika reveals that she had replaced the trap with a teddy bear and wonders aloud why Satoko would have thought it was a trap. Satoko's eyes glow red as she smirks and points a gun at Rika.
79	18	"Village-Destroying Chapter, Part 1"; Transliteration: "Satokowashi-hen Sono Ichi" (Japanese: 郷壊し編 其の壱)	Naoyuki Tatsuwa	Naoki Hayashi	February 5, 2021
After defeating Takano and the Mountain Dogs, Rika and Satoko return to normal life. In 1984, Mion has graduated and left the school, Keiichi has become the games club president, and Satoko is told that her Hinamizawa Syndrome has subsided. Rika, alongside Kimiyoshi and Oryo, formally announce that there is no curse of Oyashiro and that the Dam War had ended. No longer fearing that leaving the village would lead to a massive outbreak of Hinamizawa Syndrome, Rika decides to attend high school at St. Lucia's Academy away from the village. She tells Satoko that she wants to go there with her and she reacts with shock.
80	19	"Village-Destroying Chapter, Part 2"; Transliteration: "Satokowashi-hen Sono Ni" (Japanese: 郷壊し編 其の弐)	Takahiro Majima	Naoki Hayashi	February 12, 2021
Though Satoko is initially reluctant to join Rika in studying for the exam, she eventually recognizes how important it is to Rika and begins studying in earnest. Three years later, Rika and Satoko both pass their entrance exam and are admitted to St. Lucia's together. Rika is quickly noticed and doted upon by other girls at the school, while Satoko has a much more difficult time fitting in to the culture at St. Lucia's. When Satoko's grades begin to slip, Rika offers to help, but is turned down as Satoko does not want to be judged by Rika's new friends. Satoko watches Rika enjoying tea and intellectual conversations with her new friends from a distance, angrily wondering if Rika had forgotten the importance of their friendship.
81	20	"Village-Destroying Chapter, Part 3"; Transliteration: "Satokowashi-hen Sono San" (Japanese: 郷壊し編 其の参)	Fujiaki Asari	Naoki Hayashi	February 19, 2021
Satoko confronts Rika about her change in personality since beginning school at St. Lucia's. Rika tells Satoko to start acting like a proper St. Lucia's student. Satoko sets a trap for Rika in an attempt to help her remember her old sense of activities. However, it inadvertently injures one of Rika's friends and Satoko is sent to prison within the school for several days. Satoko concludes that Rika must have told a teacher that she had set the trap and regrets for coming to St. Lucia's. During their second year, Rika and Satoko are invited to meet with Mion, Rena and Keiichi, at the Hinamizawa school to play games. When the rest of the group decides to go to Angel Mort for dinner, Satoko elects to take a walk around the village by herself. She notices how much the village has changed: the school is set to be demolished and her and Rika's house had collapsed during a snowstorm. Satoko hears a sound coming from the statue of Oyashiro in the ritual storehouse. When she touches the statue, it cracks open and the black horn falls to the ground. As Satoko touches it, she is transported to the Sea of Fragments and is met by a tall, horned woman holding a khakkhara who seems to recognize her.
82	21	"Village-Destroying Chapter, Part 4"; Transliteration: "Satokowashi-hen Sono Yon" (Japanese: 郷壊し編 其の四)	Tomoko Hiramuki	Naoki Hayashi	February 26, 2021
Satoko meets a mysterious horned woman in the Sea of Fragments. She gives Satoko the power to loop through time every time she dies. Satoko wakes up back in June 1983, believing her experiences with Rika at St. Lucia's to be a dream. A year later, Rika asks Satoko to attend St. Lucia with her. She tells her that she does not want to go there, because she knows that Rika will change and abandon her. Rika reassures Satoko, promising that she wants to go through St. Lucia's together. Several years later, Satoko is furious that life at St. Lucia's had not changed from the previous loop. After accusing Rika of breaking her promise, she activates a trap, crushing and killing them both with a falling chandelier.
83	22	"Village-Destroying Chapter, Part 5"; Transliteration: "Satokowashi-hen Sono Go" (Japanese: 郷壊し編 其の伍)	Mitsumoto Kitamura	Naoki Hayashi	March 5, 2021
Satoko goes through several loops, unsuccessfully attempting to dissuade Rika from attending St. Lucia's. The priestess for the Sea of Fragments explains that Rika's resolve to leave the village is strong as a result of her hundred-year struggle against fate. She shows Satoko all of the previous worlds Rika had traveled through. To prevent Rika from leaving the village, Satoko decides to break her resolve by trapping her in a cycle of tragedy again. The priestess grants Satoko greater power, causing Rika's memories to persist through the loops as long as Satoko dies shortly after Rika.
84	23	"Village-Destroying Chapter, Part 6"; Transliteration: "Satokowashi-hen Sono Roku" (Japanese: 郷壊し編 其の六)	Toshikatsu Tokoro	Naoki Hayashi	March 12, 2021
Satoko names the priestess "Eua." Eua explains that, as a result of Satoko's loops, those closest to her may begin to experience memories from previous fragments. Satoko's uncle, Teppei, begins to have memories of previous loops in which he dies alone. Refusing to waste his life apart from his family, he attempts to reconnect with Satoko and tries to protect her from delinquents. He promises he will change his ways and never hurt Satoko again. Thought she attempts to make amends with her uncle, she is too disturbed by his past actions to do so. Teppei leaves, hoping that he will see Satoko again.
85	24	"Village-Destroying Chapter, Part 7"; Transliteration: "Satokowashi-hen Sono Nana" (Japanese: 郷壊し編 其の七)	Satoshi Saga	Naoki Hayashi	March 19, 2021
Satoko tells Eua that she will find a way to use her redeemed uncle for her own purposes. Takano begins to have memories of dying after her plans fail in previous loops. She opens her grandfather's photo album and discovers a note that he had left for her. In the note, Takano's grandfather expresses regret that Takano has dedicated so much of her life to his research and urges her to live her own life. Takano decides to turn herself in and abandon the operation to kill Rika and exterminate the village. Given that Takano will no longer keep Rika trapped in the village, Eua asks Satoko how she will take on the name of Oyashiro and enact her own "curse" upon Rika. Satoko steals a vial of H-173, a drug designed to induce symptoms of the terminal stages of Hinamizawa Syndrome, from Takano's briefcase. Back in the Sea of Fragments, Satoko explains that the vial will allow her to control when a tragedy occurs.

=== Higurashi: When They Cry – Sotsu (2021) ===
No. overall	No. in season	Title	Directed by	Written by	Original release date
86	1	"Demon-Revealing Chapter, Part 1"; Transliteration: "Oniakashi-hen Sono Ichi" (Japanese: 鬼明し編 其の壱)	Hijiri Sanpei	Naoki Hayashi	July 1, 2021
The events of Onidamashi-hen are shown from the perspectives of Rena and Satoko. Rena becomes upset with her father's affections for Rina Mamiya, a showgirl at a gentleman's club frequented by her father. Satoko injects Rena with H-173, while she sleeps at the nurse's office. Rena learns her father has been overspending money on Rina taken from the settlement from his divorce from Rena's mother. Rena reflects on her parents' divorce and concludes she did not try hard enough to stop the divorce and that some people do not deserve kindness. She overhears Rina discussing taking advantage of Rena's father at a nearby café. Rena scratches her neck and resolves to work harder and stop her family from falling apart again.
87	2	"Demon-Revealing Chapter, Part 2"; Transliteration: "Oniakashi-hen Sono Ni" (Japanese: 鬼明し編 其の弐)	Midori Yui	Naoki Hayashi	July 2, 2021
Rena buys tools for body disposal at a local hardware store and places them in her hideout at the Dam Construction Site. Rena leads Rina to her hideout, where Rina makes a request. As a daughter of a single-parent household, she feels sympathy for Rena's position and requests she talks to her father about keeping away from Rina and the gentleman's club. Rena begins to strangle her, saying that she has to work hard to ensure her family's safety. Rina tries to escape, but is killed and dismembered by Rena, while Satoko watches from a distance. The next day, as Rena attempts to hide the body parts at the Dam Construction Site, Keiichi arrives. While he arrived hoping to help Rena obtain a mascot statue she had noticed previously, Rena believes that Keiichi saw her hiding the body parts. To ensure that the murder remains a secret, she attempts to kill Keiichi, but cannot find an opening to do so. On her way home, Rena is questioned by Ōishi about Rina.
88	3	"Demon-Revealing Chapter, Part 3"; Transliteration: "Oniakashi-hen Sono San" (Japanese: 鬼明し編 其の参)	Mitsumoto Kitamura; Hironori Aoyagi	Naoki Hayashi	July 8, 2021
Rena buries bags containing Rina's dismembered body over several days. After seeing Keiichi speaking with Ōishi outside of school, Rena becomes convinced that Keiichi knows about her crime. She later overhears Keiichi talking on the phone with Ōishi about her past. When Keiichi's mother leaves town for a work trip, she asks Rena to cook dinner for Keiichi. Rena arrives at Keiichi's house with tools for disposing of a body hidden inside dinner boxes. Despite Keiichi's initial hesitation, he lets Rena into his house after remembering Rika's encouragement not to doubt his friends. Rika watches from a distance, satisfied that Keiichi is no longer afraid of Rena. The next day, Chie informs Rika and her classmates that Keiichi and Rena had been found unconscious at the Maebara residence. Though Keiichi had been hospitalized, Rena was pronounced dead. Realizing that this world has come to an end, Rika returns home and kills herself with a knife. Sometime later, Satoko announces that Rika will continue to face Oyashiro's curse in subsequent worlds until she gives up. Satoko kills herself, sending her and Rika to a new fragment.
89	4	"Cotton-Revealing Chapter, Part 1"; Transliteration: "Wataakashi-hen Sono Ichi" (Japanese: 綿明し編 其の壱)	Naoyuki Tatsuwa	Naoki Hayashi	July 15, 2021
After watching Rika express her continued resolve to escape her fate to Hanyū in the Sea of Fragments, Satoko awakens alongside Rika in a new world. In need of a more reliable murder weapon, Satoko tricks Teppei into revealing the information of an arms dealer. In a flashback to a previous loop, Mion teaches Satoko how to shoot a gun and she practices over several years. Back in the present, Satoko buys a handgun. Later, the club members attend a game competition at a game shop. Satoko wonders with Eua about what might happen if Mion were to be injected with H-173, having not succumbed to Hinamizawa Syndrome in any previous world. When Keiichi receives a doll from the store owner, Rika encourages Keiichi to give his doll to Mion. A discarded syringe is shown, confirming that Satoko has injected Mion.
90	5	"Cotton-Revealing Chapter, Part 2"; Transliteration: "Wataakashi-hen Sono Ni" (Japanese: 綿明し編 其の弐)	Toshikatsu Tokoro	Naoki Hayashi	July 22, 2021
Mion begins to develop feelings for Keiichi. Posing as Shion, she delivers a dinner box to him to thank him for giving her the doll. While working at a games shop one evening, Mion runs into Keiichi and Shion who appear to be on a date. After Keiichi and Shion leave together, Mion becomes upset. On the night of the festival, Shion and Keiichi sneak into the storehouse, while Mion wonders about their whereabouts. Mion begins to scratch her neck, after Satoko suggests that the two must be off alone together. Later that night, Ōishi separately informs Mayor Kimiyoshi and Shion that Tomitake and Takano have stolen a truck, and fled the village. Mion overhears Shion discussing Oyashiro's curse with Keiichi over the phone. Believing that Keiichi is being targeted because of Shion, Mion subdues and accidentally kills her. Mion expresses her belief that the three village heads must know who is behind the curse before incapacitating Oryō in her sleep.
91	6	"Cotton-Revealing Chapter, Part 3"; Transliteration: "Wataakashi-hen Sono San" (Japanese: 綿明し編 其の参)	Tatsuya Ishiguro	Naoki Hayashi	July 29, 2021
Before interrogating her, Mion realizes that Oryō is dead. Mion lures Kimiyoshi to the Sonozaki mansion and tortures him, in order to obtain information about Oyashiro's curse. However, Kimiyoshi dies maintaining that he does not know who is behind the curse. The next day, Mion overhears Rika telling Keiichi that the world is "finished", leading Mion to believe that Rika is behind Oyashiro's curse. She strangles Rika to death behind the school and discards her body in the school's septic tank. Unbeknownst to her whereabouts, Satoko becomes concerned, since she cannot travel to a new fragment with Rika unless her death can be confirmed. Mion invites Keiichi to the Sonozaki mansion, where she leads him to an underground bunker. After explaining she is trying to protect him, she locks him in a cell. Mion tells Keiichi she loves him, before leaving to ward off Satoko who has arrived at the mansion's front gate. After a confrontation, Satoko shoots Mion twice and demands to know about Rika. Mion gloats about Rika's death. Knowing that she can now travel to a new fragment with Rika, Satoko kills Mion, then herself.
92	7	"Curse-Revealing Chapter, Part 1"; Transliteration: "Tatariakashi-hen Sono Ichi" (Japanese: 祟明し編 其の壱)	Fujiaki Asari	Naoki Hayashi	August 5, 2021
In the Sea of Fragments, Eua reveals to Satoko that if she were to die before Rika while looping, Satoko would be sent to a world where Rika was never born. In a new loop, Rika sadly confides in Satoko about her "nightmares". Satoko suggests they may be messages from Oyashiro and encourages her to stay in the village. Later, the games club members participate in a baseball game which ends in victory, when Satoko hits a home run. After a celebratory barbecue, Satoko visits Teppei in Okinomiya. She asks him to move in with her, explaining that the entire village has been bullying her. Teppei overcomes with emotion and agrees to move in with her in the village for her protection. That evening, Satoko tells Rika that she will be moving with Teppei, feigning helplessness and sadness to gain Rika's sympathy. Eua gleefully watches Satoko's deception from the Sea of Fragments.
93	8	"Curse-Revealing Chapter, Part 2"; Transliteration: "Tatariakashi-hen Sono Ni" (Japanese: 祟明し編 其の弐)	Satoshi Saga	Naoki Hayashi	August 12, 2021
Satoko continues to trick the others, by posing as victims of abuse. Chie attempts to visit the Hōjō residence, but Teppei tells her to leave him and Satoko alone. In the Sea of Fragments, Eua watches as Satoko pretends to have a mental breakdown, when Keiichi tries to pat her head. Satoko's eyes flash red and return to normal, as she apologizes repeatedly. Eua declares that Satoko has become a "witch."
94	9	"Curse-Revealing Chapter, Part 3"; Transliteration: "Tatariakashi-hen Sono San" (Japanese: 祟明し編 其の参)	Midori Yui	Naoki Hayashi	August 19, 2021
Satoko leaves school and tells Teppei that she is being bullied by the village. The game club members begin to protest outside of Child Welfare Services. Wishing to protect Satoko, Teppei invites Ōishi to the house to explain the situation. Satoko secretly sedates Ōishi and injects him with H-173. Ōishi acknowledges that Satoko is being treated well and begins to suspect that the rumors of abuse are an attempt to target Teppei as a victim of Oyashiro's curse. Ōishi decides to further incite the villager's hatred of Teppei to use him as bait and apprehend the culprit behind the curse. While scratching his neck, Ōishi vandalizes the Furude Shrine.
95	10	"Curse-Revealing Chapter, Part 4"; Transliteration: "Tatariakashi-hen Sono Yon" (Japanese: 祟明し編 其の四)	Fujiaki Asari	Naoki Hayashi	August 26, 2021
The protesters continue negotiating with the agents outside of Child Welfare Services. Knowing about determination, Ōishi suspects that Keiichi has been tricked by his friends into unwittingly taking part in bullying Satoko. When the Sonozaki family begins pressuring Child Welfare Services into action, Ōishi offers to escort a social worker to the Hōjō residence. Upon realizing Satoko is not being abused, the social worker gives the case to the police at Ōishi's request. Before leaving, Ōishi warns Teppei that he may be targeted by the curse. Satoko sedates Teppei, and calls Keiichi and Rika, telling them that Teppei has been arrested. On the evening of the festival, Satoko prepares to shoot Teppei. Before doing so, she pulls her arm away and tells him to run. Back in the Sea of Fragments, Satoko fights with a red-eyed replica of herself. She tells the red-eyed one that she loves Rika and refuses to kill anyone. The replica asserts she is the "real" herself and claims she is acting in their best interest. Eua tells Satoko that she will take away her feelings of remorse, and allows the replica to shoot the latter. Back in the Hōjō residence, Satoko shoots Teppei and disfigures him with a baseball bat.
96	11	"Curse-Revealing Chapter, Part 5"; Transliteration: "Tatariakashi-hen Sono Go" (Japanese: 祟明し編 其の伍)	Yasunori Gotō	Naoki Hayashi	September 2, 2021
Satoko cleans her body, and attends the festival with Rika and the others. Rika monologues to Hanyū about finally escaping her fate, unaware that a tragedy had already transpired. During Rika's dance, Satoko lures Keiichi away and asks him to come to her house. After stepping into the room near Teppei's body, Satoko ambushes and knocks Keiichi unconscious with a baseball bat. Satoko calls Ōishi, who was spying on the Hōjō residence from the car. Ōishi investigates the scene, and interrogates Satoko. She lies about the circumstances of the crime, claiming Teppei and Keiichi had attacked each other, and that Rika was the one pulling the strings. Ōishi, ecstatically declares he has solved the case and interrupts the festival with the bat he picked up from the crime scene. There, Ōishi begins to strangle Rika, and kills Shion and Mion with the handgun. He then kills Rika with a bat. Satoko wanders into the festival and announces that she was the mastermind all along, and shoots Ōishi while the confused and horrified Rena discovers this. Satoko then shoots Rika in the head to confirm her death with certainty, before killing herself. In the Sea of Fragments, Eua watches the fragment and maniacally laughs, questioning Hanyū's options now that the latter can no longer observe the events and transpire in the world.
97	12	"God-Entertaining Chapter, Part 1"; Transliteration: "Kagurashi-hen Sono Ichi" (Japanese: 神楽し編 其の壱)	Hironori Aoyagi	Naoki Hayashi	September 9, 2021
Hanyū reminisces about her past and relationship with Rika in the Sea of Fragments. Satoko overhears Hanyū telling Rika about a sword hidden inside the ritual storehouse statue that can kill someone living in loops. As Satoko steals it, she unknowingly breaks off a shard that Rika later finds. As Rika is killed repeatedly over four loops, Satoko gleefully watches from afar. Hanyū appears in the Sea of Fragments and confronts Eua.
98	13	"God-Entertaining Chapter, Part 2"; Transliteration: "Kagurashi-hen Sono Ni" (Japanese: 神楽し編 其の弐)	Satoshi Saga	Naoki Hayashi	September 16, 2021
Eua overpowers Hanyū, and forces her to watch Rika's death at the hands of Keiichi and Satoko in two separated fragments. In a new world, Rika tells Satoko that she has decided to stay in Hinamizawa and finds that no tragedies occur for several weeks. While buying a gift for Satoko's birthday, Rika begins to experience memories of her death. She places Satoko's gift in a box that previously was used for a prank in an earlier loop. When Satoko sees the box, she flinches, accidentally demonstrating her memories of prior fragments. Rika experiences another memory of Satoko shooting her and killing Ōishi, confirming for Rika that Satoko is behind her repeated deaths. Realizing that her guilt has been discovered, Satoko grins and equips the gun.
99	14	"God-Entertaining Chapter, Part 3"; Transliteration: "Kagurashi-hen Sono San" (Japanese: 神楽し編 其の参)	Hijiri Sanpei; Takashi Ikehata	Naoki Hayashi	September 23, 2021
Satoko kills herself and Rika, leaving their classmates horrified. The two begin fighting each other across numerous loops at Hinamizawa and St. Lucia Academy, blaming themselves for present circumstances. After accidentally merging two pieces of the sword, Rika retrieves it from Satoko. Hanyū breaks free and tries to stop Eua, but is immobilized by the khakkhara.
100	15	"God-Entertaining Chapter, Part 4"; Transliteration: "Kagurashi-hen Sono Yon" (Japanese: 神楽し編 其の四)	Takashi Ikehata	Naoki Hayashi	September 30, 2021
Rika discards the sword in the river and tells Satoko that she could not live in a world without her. As they continue fighting, the sword miraculously appears and wielded by Hanyū. She defeats Eua, cracking her horn and transforming her into a young girl. Eua witnesses a miracle, but tells her that the gate between worlds will open and telling her that the world will be hers and departs from the Sea of Fragments. Satoko and Rika lie together in a riverbank exhausted, before being found by their friends. The two tell them that they had a fight and nearly ending their friendship. Rena, Mion and Keiichi tell them they can remain friends, even if they are not with each other. Realizing the importance of friendship, Satoko and Rika hold hands. The timeline jumps to spring 1987, where Rika decides to go to St. Lucia alone and for Satoko to stay in the village with everyone else. Before Rika leaves, she and Satoko resolve to see each other soon and note that, as loopers whose lives are eternal, they need time apart to strengthen their eternal friendship. Satoshi wakes up at the clinic basement. Satoko's witch persona finds her new life boring and returns complete control of her body to the latter. Hanyū sits near the shrine and watches everyone peacefully moving on for their lives.
