= Music of Dance Dance Revolution (1998 video game) =

The music of Dance Dance Revolution is the collective soundtracks of the initial Dance Dance Revolution game in Konami's music simulation series. The soundtracks rely heavily on licensed music from Toshiba EMI's Dancemania series and also contain original songs produced by Konami's in-house artist Naoki Maeda. The original arcade game contains 11 tracks. Due to the staggered release of the game in other regions additional songs from newer releases in the series appear in the Asian, American and European releases.

== List of tracks ==
Legend
Track is available.
Track is only available under certain conditions.
Track is unavailable.

Across, releases are listed in chronological order. Down, tracks are listed by in-game sort order then by chronological release.

№	Song	Artist	Japan	Asia	Americas	Europe
1	"BUTTERFLY"	SMiLE.dk	Yes	Yes	Yes	Yes
2	"HAVE YOU NEVER BEEN MELLOW"	THE OLIVIA PROJECT	Yes	Yes	Yes	Yes
3	"KUNG FU FIGHTING"	BUS STOP featuring CARL DOUGLAS	Yes	No	No	No
4	"LET'S GET DOWN"	JT PLAYAZ	Yes	No	No	No
5	"LITTLE BITCH"	THE SPECIALS	Yes	No	No	No
6	"MY FIRE"	X-TREME	Yes	Yes	Yes	Yes
7	"STRICTLY BUSINESS"	MANTRONIK VS EPMD	Yes	Yes	No	No
8	"THAT'S THE WAY (I LIKE IT)"	KC & THE SUNSHINE BAND	Yes	No	No	No
9	"MAKE IT BETTER"	mitsu-O!	Yes	Yes	Yes	Yes
10	"PARANOiA"	180	Final	Final	Final	Final
11	"TRIP MACHINE"	DE-SIRE	Final	Final	Final	Final

== Tracks ==
This is a list of the tracks featured as music in Dance Dance Revolution. For a list of the tracks that originally appeared in Dance Dance Revolution 2ndMix see the music of Dance Dance Revolution 2ndMix.

=== Butterfly ===
"Butterfly" is a song by Smile.dk.

=== Have You Never Been Mellow ===
"Have You Never Been Mellow" is a song by The Olivia Project.

=== Kung Fu Fighting ===
A version of "Kung Fu Fighting" by Bus Stop featuring Carl Douglas.

=== Let's Get Down ===
"Let's Get Down" is a song by JT Playaz. It takes the music for its refrain from the song "Celebration" by Kool & the Gang.

=== Little Bitch ===
"Little Bitch" is a song by The Specials, featured on their 1979 self-titled album.

=== Make It Better ===
"Make It Better" is a song by Mitsu-O!. It is noted for its similarities to the song "Money" by Ragga Twins, a song which is in the data of the game but left unused.

=== My Fire ===
"My Fire" is a song by X-Treme.

=== Paranoia ===
"Paranoia" is a song by 180. In the original release of Dance Dance Revolution, this was the only Konami Original song.

=== Strictly Business ===
"Strictly Business" is a song by Mantronik vs EPMD.

=== That's The Way (I Like It) ===
"That's The Way (I Like It)" is a song by KC & The Sunshine Band.

=== Trip Machine ===
"Trip Machine" is a song by De-Sire.

== See also ==
- Music of Dance Dance Revolution 2ndMix
