= Paranoia (Eiko Shimamiya song) =

Single by Eiko Shimamiya
- B-side: "To lose in amber -I'VE in BUDOKAN live ver.-"
- Released: July 29, 2009
- Genre: J-Pop
- Length: 12:01
- Label: Geneon
- Songwriter(s): Kazuya Takase, Eiko Shimamiya
- Producer(s): I've Sound

Eiko Shimamiya singles chronology
"Super scription of data" (2009)	"Paranoia" (2009)	"Onkalo" (2012)

Paranoia is a maxi single released by the J-pop singer Eiko Shimamiya. It will be produced by Geneon and I've Sound. The single was scheduled to be released on July 29, 2009, a month after releasing her fifth single Super scription of data. This is Shimamiya's first single which does not have an anime tie-in. This single has also been contained in the I've Sound 10th Anniversary 「Departed to the future」 Special CD BOX which was released on March 25, 2009.

The coupling song To lose in amber -I'VE in BUDOKAN 2009 live ver.- is the live version of her visual novel theme song with I've Sound that she performed in their concert in Budokan last January 2, 2009.

The single will only come in a limited CD+DVD edition (GNCV-0019). The DVD will contain the Promotional Video for Paranoia.

== Track listing ==
1. Paranoia—4:20
  Composition/Arrangement: Kazuya Takase
  Lyrics: Eiko Shimamiya
2. To lose in amber -I'VE in BUDOKAN 2009 live ver.- -- 3:23
  Composition/Arrangement: Kazuya Takase
  Lyrics: SAYUMI
3. Paranoia -instrumental- -- 4:18

== Charts and sales ==
Chart	Rank	Total sales
Oricon Weekly Chart	185	326
