= Paranoia (magazine) =

Paranoia: The Conspiracy Reader
- Editor-in-Chief: Ron Patton
- Categories: Conspiracy theories; parapolitics; alternative history; secret societies; paranormal phenomena
- Frequency: Thrice-yearly
- Founder: Joan d'Arc; Al Hidell
- Founded: 1992
- First issue: Spring 1993
- Country: United States
- Based in: Providence, Rhode Island, U.S.
- Language: English

Paranoia: The Conspiracy Reader, also known as Paranoia: The Conspiracy & Paranormal Reader, covered topics of pre-internet culture including conspiracy theories, parapolitics, alternative history, and the paranormal.

== History ==
Paranoia was founded in 1992 in Providence, Rhode Island by Joan d'Arc and Al Hidell. It was published three times a year, with a print run circulating 15,000 copies. Hidell claimed that the publication began in 1993, coinciding with the Waco siege and 30th anniversary of the Assassination of John F. Kennedy.

Ron Patton later became the publisher and editor in chief.

== Reception ==
Chip Rowe at Playboy wrote "some of the stories make you chuckle," stating that it contains material from the Warren Commission and that it claims the Eagles' "Hotel California" is a reference to Satan. Peter Carlson at The Washington Post described that the magazine provides information you won't find in the mainstream media. In its review of issue 28, SLUG wrote "It's all fascinating reading, since some of it is likely true."

BuzzFeed wrote that the magazine "mixes hard-hitting journalism with Onion-style articles". Lobster's 1993 issue #26 compared the magazine with Back Channels, writing that both seem "to betray that fear of appearing academic." Ruth Parnell at Nexus wrote "it does its job well in presenting an interesting variety of material." Paranoia: The Conspiracy Reader was a Merit Winner for Writer's Digest National Zine Publishing Awards in 2001.

== See also ==
- Why People Believe Weird Things
