= Hikari Nadeshiko =

Studio album by Eiko Shimamiya
- Released: 2 April 2008
- Recorded: 2007–2008
- Genre: J-pop
- Label: Geneon
- Producer: I've

Eiko Shimamiya chronology
O (2006)	Hikari Nadeshiko (2008)	Perfect World (2010)

Hikari Nadeshiko (ひかりなでしこ) is the second full-length album from Eiko Shimamiya. It includes the hit single Naraku no Hana (opening from the Higurashi no Naku Koro ni Kai). It was released on April 2, 2008. It reached the 27th place on the Oricon Weekly Albums Chart.

The catalog numbers for this album are: GNCV-1003 for the limited edition with a bonus DVD which will contain the PV for the album title Hikari Nadeshiko and GNCV-1004 for the regular edition (CD only).

== Track listing ==
All lyrics are written by Eiko Shimamiya.

No.	Title	Music	Arranger	Length
1.	"Introduction"	Tomoyuki Nakazawa	Nakazawa
2.	"Hikari Nadeshiko" (ひかりなでしこ)	Shimamiya	Toshiaki Nishioka, Seiichi Kyōda	6:20
3.	"All Alone"	Kazuya Takase	Takase	6:02
4.	"Atlante"	Shimamiya	Nakazawa	4:34
5.	"Kanransha" (観覧車)	Shimamiya	Sorma No.1	5:02
6.	"Scheherazade"	Shimamiya	Sorma No.1	4:58
7.	"Naraku no Hana" (奈落の花)	Nakazawa	Nakazawa, Takeshi Ozaki	5:00
8.	"Aoi Kajitsu" (青い果実)	Shimamiya	Nishioka	6:15
9.	"Flow"	Shimamiya	Sorma No.1	4:40
10.	"Asunaro no Ki" (あすなろの木)	Shimamiya	Kyōda	5:51
11.	"Jūyon no Tsuki" (十四の月)	Shimamiya	Takase	6:14
12.	"Haru Michiru" (ハルミチル)	Shimamiya	Maiko Iuchi	3:49
13.	"Ai no Uta" (愛のうた)	Shimamiya	C.G mix	4:54

== Charts and sales ==
Oricon Ranking (Weekly)	Sales
27	7,333
