= Bantu Men's Social Centre =

The Bantu Men's Social Centre, founded in 1924 in Johannesburg, South Africa, played social, political, and cultural roles in the lives of black South Africans.

== History ==
The Bantu Men's Social Centre was started by Rev. Ray E. Phillips (1889–1967) of the American Board Mission in central Johannesburg for recreational activities by black South Africans. Phillips was a Congregational minister who in 1918 came to South Africa from the United States with Dora, his wife (1892–1967). During the forty years that the Phillipses spent in South Africa, Ray helped found a number of organisations to assist black South Africans, or to foster racial co-operation. Firmly opposed to segregation, Phillips was involved in the founding of the South African Institute of Race Relations (1929), the Johannesburg Coordinating Council for Non-European Welfare Organization, and the Jan H. Hofmeyr School of Social Work (1941), of which he was the director. The Hofmeyr School provided training for black social workers, among whom was Winnie Madikizela, before her marriage to Nelson Mandela. Political activists like Nelson Mandela and Walter Sisulu (1912–2003) were members of the Bantu Men's Social Centre, and the African National Congress's Youth League was started on its premises in 1944.

The Social Centre was located at 1 Eloff Street at the edge of Johannesburg's central business district, among car dealerships and cheap food stores. Apart from a gymnasium, the Social Centre building featured a stage. Next door was Dorkay House, a former clothing factory and eventual home to the South African Union of Artists (later known as Union Artists).

From the 1920s Richard Victor Selope Thema served as superintendent of the Social Centre, resigning in 1932 when he was appointed editor of The Bantu World. The patrons of the Men's Social Centre included Howard Pim, after whom the Soweto suburb of Pimville was named. Pim was also involved in the Institute of Race Relations, the Bantu Sports Club, the Bridgeman Memorial Hospital (now the Garden City Clinic, Mayfair), and the South African Native College (University of Fort Hare) in Alice, in the Eastern Cape. J.R. Rathebe, the first full-time secretary of the Bantu Men's Social Centre, paid tribute to Pim at his funeral in 1934. Prior to Rathebe's appointment in 1932, the Social Centre's management committee was white (Cobley 1997:137-40).

=== Library ===
A library for black South Africans existed at the Social Centre from at least 1929. Although dormant by 1931, the library was revived in June 1932 by stock from the Carnegie Non-European Library Service, hosted at Germiston. In 1937 Herbert Isaac Ernest Dhlomo became the Librarian-Organiser of the Library Service. He was also a member of the Social Centre. The library at first consisted of a bookcase in the lounge, which was expanded by 1934 to over 200 books. Members had to pay a deposit of more than a day's wage to borrow books. Seminal South African author Peter Abrahams (born 1919) worked at the Social Centre in 1937. In his autobiography, Abrahams remembered encountering books in the Social Centre library that would help form his own writing. One of the first he found was W. E. B. Du Bois' The Souls of Black Folk. Black women were also allowed to check out books, although few did, given the nature of the Social Centre as a male dominion. From December 1939 the library was stocked and staffed by the Johannesburg municipality. The Bantu Men's Social Centre library was now open to all black residents of Johannesburg, free of charge. Soon the library had gained over a thousand members who could borrow from more than three thousand books, periodicals, and newspaper files.

In 1935 Emmanuel Lithebe was appointed as a black assistant secretary; he met with Ralph Bunche in 1937. Bunche was an African-American scholar and Nobel laureate (1950) who visited the Social Centre during his three-month journey through South Africa (1937–38). Lithebe was replaced by Julius Malie in 1939, the same year that A.P. Khutlang was appointed as physical director (Cobley 1997:137-40).

=== Cultural and political impact ===
Various plays were presented to a variety of audiences on the Social Centre's stage. In 1938, for example, Dhlomo presented Moshoeshoe, a drama about the baSotho king, performed in English. A large, racially mixed audience watched the all-African cast that included Dhlomo. The Mayor of Johannesburg and several committee members of the Non-European Library Service were among those in attendance.

In 1944 the African National Congress' Youth League was formed at the Bantu Men's Social Centre, with Anton Lembede elected as president. The only woman at the founding meeting was Nontsikelelo Albertina Metetiwe (1918–), who married Sisulu on 15 July that year at Cofimvaba, in the Transkei. Ellen Khuzwayo became the League's secretary. The Sisulu's wedding reception was held at the Bantu Men's Social Centre on 17 July. The reception included Nelson Mandela and Anton Lambede, who with David Wilcox Hlahane Bopape (1915–2004), Oliver Tambo, A.P. Mda, Godfrey Pitje, and Sisulu constituted the Youth League's first National Executive Committee. While working at the Premier Milling Company in the early 1930s, Sisulu attended night school at the Social Centre in 1933. When he was fired from Premier for organising a strike for higher wages in 1936, Sisulu worked as a distribution agent for The Bantu World, then under leadership of Social Centre alumnus Selope Thema.

A farewell concert was held at the Social Centre in 1956 for Father Trevor Huddleston, the missionary priest of Sophiatown.

Sport also received attention at the Social Centre, which hosted not only a boxing club, but also several fights. Alumni of the Bantu Men's Social Centre Boxing Club included Theo Mthembu, who became a professional boxer in 1948. Mthembu received the Order of Ikhamanga (silver) in 2004 from the South African government for his contributions towards non-racial sport.

South Africa's first black African landscape painter, Moses Tladi, also frequented the Social Centre during the post-War period.

In 1958 Athol Fugard's No-Good Friday was performed, showing for the first time the reality of black South Africans. Fugard held auditions at the Bantu Men's Social Centre which drew only males, who were either members of the centre or musicians from Union Artists. The cast included Fugard, who also directed, and first-time actors Stephen Moloi, Connie Mabaso, Dan Poho, Ken Gampu, Zakes Mokae, Preddie Ramphele, Bloke Modisane, and Gladys Sibisi. The African Feeding Fund, through its white chairman, Hugh Tatham, was the sponsor. The audience comprised mostly black Africans. The only whites present were Tatham and his committee, actor and critic Bill Brewer, and acting teacher Benedicta Bonnacorsi.

On 8 June 1959 Fugard's Nongogo was performed by a cast comprising Cornelius Mabaso, David Phetoe, Solomon Rachilo, Thandi Khumalo and Zakes Mokae. The significance of Fugard's racially mixed plays at the Social Centre is that at the time other theatre venues prohibited racially mixed casts.

The Social Centre offered performances and training in jazz and classical music in the late 1950s. One room held a number of gramophones which members could listen and practice music to. Eric Gallo, chair of Gallo Africa record company, donated musical instruments to the Social Centre.

Apart from events for black South Africans, the Social Centre was also used for a while for meetings by Johannesburg's Quakers (Society of Friends), who were mostly a white expatriate group. They were anxious to meet in places where blacks could attend without harassment. Howard Pim was one of the Quakers.

Alan Cobley (1997) relates that membership declined during the apartheid era. In line with the Group Areas Act the Bantu Men's Social Centre was forced to close on 31 December 1971. The West Rand Administration Board occupied the building from 1973. Appeals by the centre's executive committee for a building in Soweto fell on deaf ears. The Bantu Men's Social Centre issued its final report in 1975.

== Members and workers ==
Members and workers include Peter Abrahams, Herbert Isaac Ernest Dhlomo, Anton Lambede, Nelson Mandela, A.S Vil-Nkomo, J.R. Rathebe, Walter Sisulu, Richard Victor Selope Thema, Rev J.Mdelwa Hlongwane, Paul Mosaka, Merafe, and Musi.

== See also ==
- Jan H. Hofmeyr School of Social Work
- The World (South African newspaper)

== Note ==
- "Bantu" literally means "people." Because it was used extensively by state officials and in state departments overseeing the implementation of apartheid, "Bantu" achieved a pejorative value in South Africa, where it is seldom (if ever) used today. Originally the word referred to a system of related languages distributed throughout Sub-Saharan Africa, all of which use "-ntu-" (as in abantu, umuntu).

== Bibliography ==
- Cobley, Alan. The Rules of the Game – Struggles in Black Recreation and Social Welfare Policy in South Africa, 1997.
- Iris Berger, "From Ethnography to Social Welfare. Ray Phillips and Representations of Urban Women in South Africa", Social Sciences and Missions (Leiden Brill), N°19/December 2006, pp. 91–116
