= Xuma =

Xuma is a surname. Notable people with the name include:

- Alfred Bitini Xuma (1893–1962), first black South African to become a medical doctor and president-general of the African National Congress
- Madie Hall Xuma (1894–1982), American activist in South Africa

== See also ==
- Dr Xuma house, Historical building in South Africa
