= Dr Xuma house =

House in Sophiatown, South Africa

Dr. Xuma's house
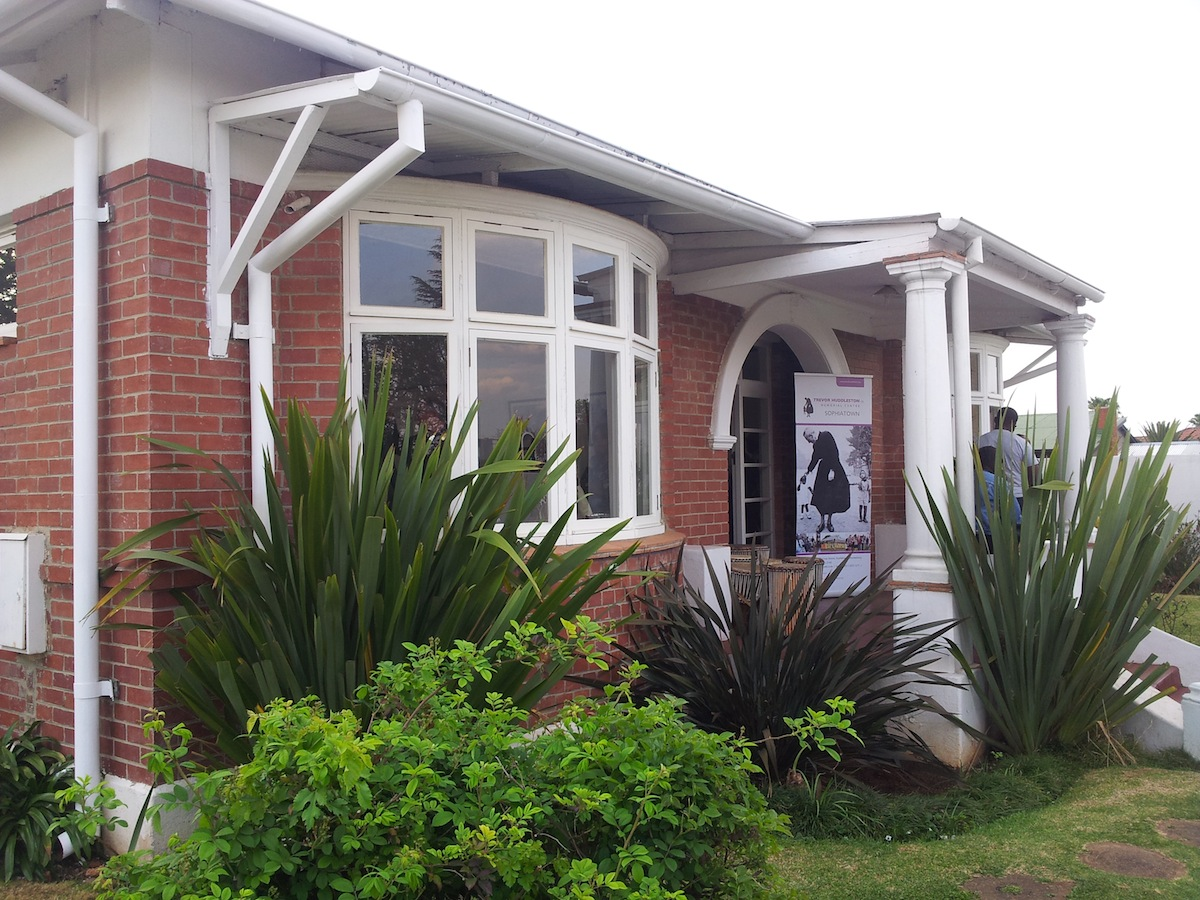
- Dr Xuma's house in 2013
- Interactive map of the Dr. Xuma's house area

General information
- Status: Completed
- Location: 73 Toby Street, Sophiatown
- Coordinates: 26°10′34″S 27°59′00″E

Technical details
- Floor count: single

Dr. Xuma's house was one of two houses to escape the destruction of Sophiatown, South Africa by the government in the late 1950s, it is also a landmark which belonged to Dr Alfred Bitini Xuma who was a medical doctor and the President of the African National Congress (ANC) and Chairperson of the Western Areas Anti-Expropriation and Proper Housing Committee. Construction of the house was completed in 1935 and named Empilweni which roughly translates to "the place of life". Xuma and his second wife Madie Hall Xuma lived there until his own property was expropriated when Sophiatown was declared a White area in terms of the Native Resettlement Act of 1954, and he had vacated it by 1957.

== Design ==
The house is a single-storey dwelling with an entrance hall, lounge, dining room, kitchen, scullery and pantry, guest toilet, three bedrooms, a play room, two bathrooms (one en suite), and a stoep (porch). Outbuildings consist of a double garage, two rooms with a kitchenette, laundry, toilet and basin room.

The house is built of red brick with a corrugated tin roof. The front elevation has curved bay windows and an arch to the entrance way, flanked by plain columns. The house was built of face brick in stretcher bond to the window level, with a plastered section above. An unusual feature is the bracketed lean-to canopy which extends the full front of the house providing a separate covering for the bays.

The house was a mansion in the Sophiatown of its day. The house occupied two stands whereas most of his neighbours were in terrace or semi-detached housing. The writer, actor and journalist Bloke Modisane, reminisces that among all those modest rundown buildings, could stand the palatial home of Dr A.B. Xuma with its two garages. Modisane remembers how he and his widowed mother, who ran a shebeen, had looked to Xuma and his house for a model of the good life, i.e. separate bedrooms, a room for sitting, another for eating, and a room to be alone, for reading or thinking, to shut out South Africa and not be black.

Dr Xuma arranged his consulting rooms within the house to face Edward Road, the L-shaped plan allowing one wing for his residence and the other for his medical practice. Inside, the house has pressed steel ceilings, klompie brick fireplaces and the lounge has a plaster ceiling with exposed timbers. The house has polished timber floors, doors, skirtings and picture rails giving it a traditional and high quality interior.

Currently the house is the location of the Sophiatown Heritage and Cultural Centre.

== Social history ==
Sophiatown was to Johannesburg what District 6 was to Cape Town. Around 65,000 people were evicted from their homes in the mid-1950s.

Dr. Xuma's house is one of only two houses of Sophiatown to have been retained after the removal of the Black tenants and owners, and the renaming of the township as Triomf.

As the home of one of the major Black leaders who re-organised the ANC and coordinated much of the opposition to racial discrimination in the Forties, it should be seen as a milestone in the Black liberation struggle.

== Recent history ==
In 2006, the decision was taken to reinstate the township’s original name and Sophiatown was reborn. The four bedroomed house remained in residential use until 2008, when it was opened to the public as the Sophiantown Heritage and Cultural Museum.

== Heritage status ==
Dr. Xuma's house was declared a national monument in 1998 and a heritage site in 1999. It is historically and culturally significant for the following reasons:

- It was home to Dr. Xuma, President of the African National Congress and a Black leader who fought against racial discrimination in the 1940s
- It is one of only two houses in Sophiatown that survive following removal of Black tenants and owners in the 1950s
- The house incorporated medical consulting rooms and access to medical care would have been an important social amenity for the local community
- The house has some distinctive aesthetic features both externally and internally giving it design interest
