= Arthur Maimane =

South African journalist and novelist (1932–2005)

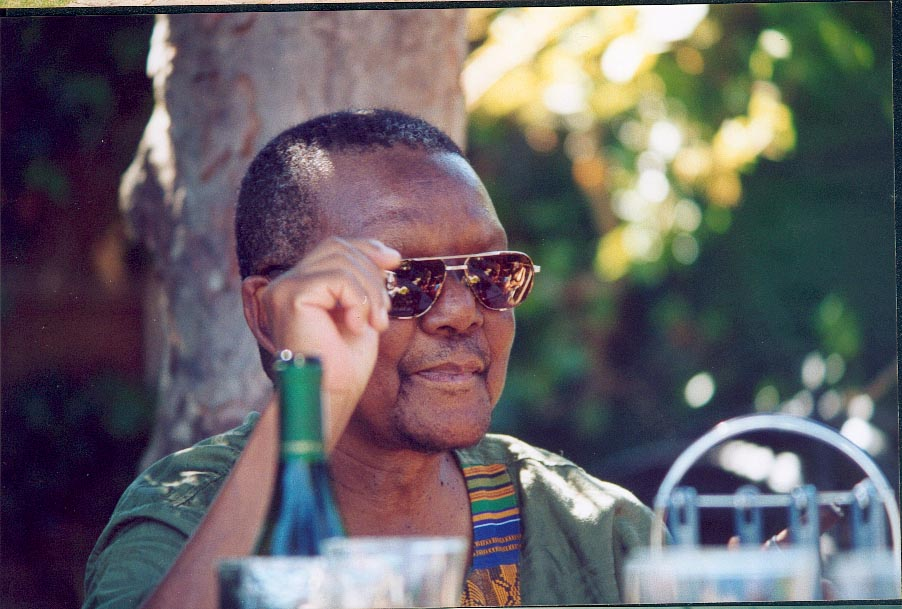
- Born: John Arthur Mogale Maimane; 5 October 1932; Pretoria, South Africa
- Died: 28 June 2005 (aged 72); London, England
- Education: St Peter's College, Johannesburg
- Occupations: Novelist, journalist
- Writing career
- Pen name: Arthur Mogale
- Notable works: Victims (1976); Hate No More (2000)

John Arthur Mogale Maimane (5 October 1932 – 28 June 2005), better known as Arthur Maimane, was a South African journalist and novelist.

== Biography ==
Maimane was born in Pretoria, South Africa, growing up in the black township of Lady Selborne. He was educated in Johannesburg at St Peter's College, also known as the "Black Eton" of South Africa (Oliver Tambo was his mathematics teacher before becoming a lawyer and president of the African National Congress). Maimane was originally intending to study medicine, when a young priest, Trevor Huddleston (who was involved in the Sophiatown forced removals), persuaded him to take a vacation job at Drum magazine. As a result, Maimane choose journalism as his life career. He was a versatile journalist, covering a wide spectrum of subjects for Drum, including writing sports reports, thriller and interviews with beauty queens and other celebrities.

=== Reporter ===
Joining Drum in the early 1950s, he was mentored by Henry Nxumalo. The photograph of Maimane in Anthony Sampson's 1956 book Drum: A Venture into the New Africa, "trilby on back of head, cigarette dangling", is an amusing take-off of the Hollywood "newshound" image, but conceals his innate seriousness as a reporter and analyst of the world around him.

Under the pseudonym Arthur Mogale, he wrote a regular series for Drum entitled "The Chief", in which he described gangster incidents he had heard about in the shebeens. Don Mattera, a leading Sophiatown gangster, took exception to this: "The gangsters were pissed off with him and there was a word out that we should wipe this guy off."

Maimane moved to Drum magazine's sister daily paper, Golden City Post, as the news editor but he did not stay long. In 1958, the year after his friend Nxumalo was murdered by unknown assailants, Maimane relocated to Ghana to work on the West African edition of Drum.

Moving in 1961 to London, England, the young editor accepted a position at Reuters and was posted to Dar es Salaam, Tanzania, as the agency's correspondent in East Africa. There, Maimane met his second wife, Jenny, and, when he was deported from Tanzania, after refusing the founding editorship of TANU's new daily and for critically reporting political events, the couple returned to London.

From 1964, Maimane worked for the BBC African Service at Bush House, going on to be a news writer for BBC One's current affairs programme 24 Hours from 1966, and then moving to Independent Television News (ITN) in 1973. In 1976, his novel Victims was published in London by Allison and Busby but was banned in South Africa, although the English Academy of South Africa awarded Maimane its Pringle Award for Creative Writing in 1978.

He took early retirement from ITN in 1989, and after the release of Nelson Mandela in 1990, Maimane was invited to return to South Africa by the liberal Weekly Mail, reporting on the early dismantling of apartheid legislation in 1991 as the newspaper's parliamentary correspondent. He returned again to South Africa after the 1994 elections and was appointed Features editor of the Weekly Mail. He also wrote a column for the Sunday Independent. After a brief return to England, he was appointed managing editor of the Johannesburg Star, South Africa's biggest daily newspaper (1994–97). His post-apartheid play, Hang on in There, Nelson, was performed at the Windybrow Theatre in Johannesburg and at the State Theatre in Pretoria, in 1996. His novel Victims was reissued in 2000 under the title Hate No More in South Africa.

In 2001, Maimane and his wife returned to London, after he had been diagnosed with lung cancer.

Maimane died on 28 June 2005, aged 72, at the Charing Cross Hospital in London.

== Books ==
- Victims, London: Allison & Busby, 1976. ISBN 0-85031-162-4 (Winner of the English Academy of South Africa's Thomas Pringle Award for Creative Writing in 1979).
- Hate No More (reissued version of Victims), Kwela Books, 2000, ISBN 0-7957-0102-0.

== See also ==
- List of South African writers
