= Orlando East Public Library =

Oldest library in Soweto in South Africa

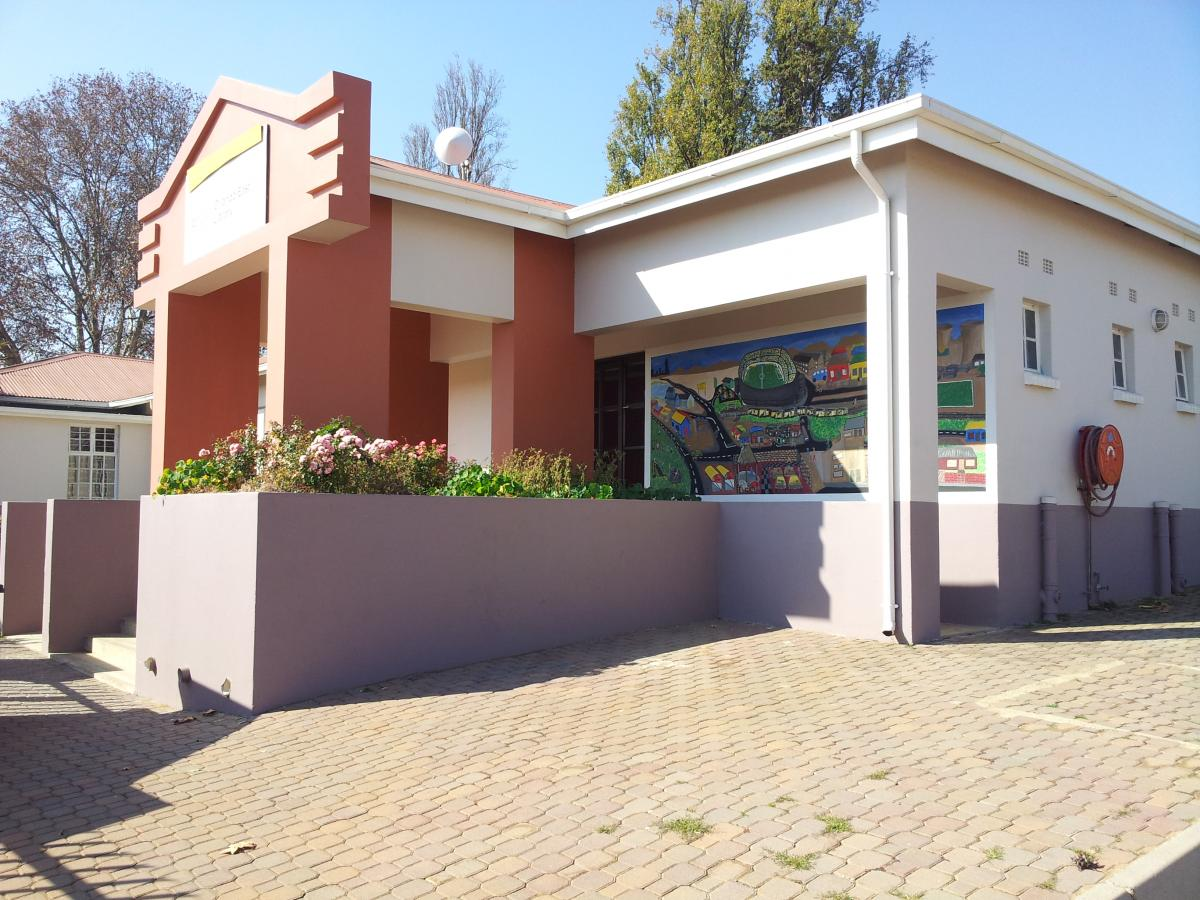
- 26°14′06″S 27°55′21″E
- Location: Mooki Street, Orlando East, Soweto, South Africa
- Type: Public library
- Established: 1948; 78 years ago
- Branch of: City of Johannesburg Library and Information Services

Access and use
- Population served: Soweto

Orlando East Public Library is the oldest library in Soweto in South Africa.

== History ==
The library is said to have started in two iron huts in 1948 that lacked both electricity and seating.

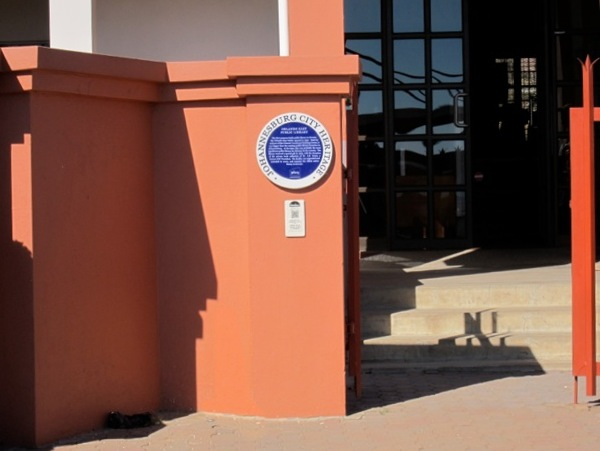
2013 plaques

The library was housed in the first building in Soweto designed to be a public library in 1950. It was built on Mooki Street by people from the local Vocational Training Centre and impressively it was larger than other public library then available in the main city of Johannesburg. It was probably the most important library for Africans in South Africa at the time. In 2012 the libraries in Soweto said they had nearly fifty thousand members.

The Library's collection was given a substantial gift in 1963 when Madie Hall Xuma, the American born widow of Dr. A.B.Xuma who had been a President of the African National Congress during the 1940s, gave his book collection to the library. Her husband had died in 1962 and she moved back to the United States. Madie Hall Xuma had also been active in South African politics becoming president of the national council of the South African Young Women's Christian Association.

== Today ==
In 2000 the library was updated and extended. In 2013 a blue plaque was installed to recognise the library's importance as the oldest public library.

The library has good signage and still has spacious accommodation. It attracts students to study with its "fairly full" shelves and a good reference section that includes textbooks. Upstairs there is a media centre and an area reserved for children's books. The library offered free internet access in 2013.
