= Colours of a New Day =

1990 anthology

Colours of a New Day: Writing for South Africa is an anthology first published in 1990, edited by Sarah LeFanu and Stephen Hayward, inspired by an international tribute concert to imprisoned anti-apartheid revolutionary Nelson Mandela on his 70th birthday in 1988. As described by The New Internationalist magazine: "This is the literary equivalent of the Free Mandela concert: a collection of prose and poetry by 34 writers from around the world who have pledged their profits to an ANC cultural project inside South Africa." Taking the title from an optimistic phrase used by a character in Lewis Nkosi's story "Under the Shadow of the Guns", the editors aimed to publish a book that would give writers the opportunity to express their opposition to apartheid and also to provide material assistance for the cultural work of the African National Congress (ANC), to which the writers' royalties and publishers' profits were donated.

Colours of a New Day was published almost simultaneously in 1990 in the Britain, South Africa, North America, Nigeria and India. The editors' Preface concluded with the words: "In bringing together many of the finest writers currently working in the English language, it is our hope that this anthology will draw to the attention of a worldwide community of readers the need to maintain support for the African National Congress until the colours of a new day have lit up the whole of Southern Africa."

On 11 February 1990, Nelson Mandela was released from prison after 27 years. He contributed a Foreword to Colours of a New Day, dated 16 April 1990, in which he wrote: "The past five years have seen unprecedented acts of solidarity by the international cultural community with the struggle for freedom of our people. ...But this anthology, Colours of a New Day, is the first to be produced whose proceeds go directly to the African National Congress. We salute the writers — from Africa, Asia, the British Isles, North America and the Caribbean — who have contributed towards the creation of a new dawn in South Africa. Amandla!"

== Contributors ==
- Brian Aldiss
- Margaret Atwood
- Margaret Busby
- Nuruddin Farah
- Nadine Gordimer
- Roy Heath
- Christopher Hope
- Aamer Hussein
- June Jordan
- Nicole Ward Jouve
- James Kelman
- Mandla Langa
- Hugh Maxton
- Naomi Mitchison
- Ursule Molinaro
- Mbulelo V. Mzamane
- Lewis Nkosi
- Joyce Carol Oates
- Ben Okri
- Emily Prager
- Kate Pullinger
- Michèle Roberts
- Dennis Scott
- Lawrence Scott
- Vikram Seth
- Bapsi Sidhwa
- Wole Soyinka
- Han Suyin
- Edward Upward
- Marina Warner
- Ian Watson
- Zoë Wicomb
- Raymond Williams
- Jane Yolen

== Editions ==
- London, UK: Lawrence and Wishart (hardback), July 1990, ISBN 978-0853157304
- Braamfontein, South Africa: Ravan Press, 1990, ISBN 9780869754030
- New York, US: Pantheon Books, 1990
- Ibadan, Nigeria: Spectrum Books, 1990
- Calcutta, India: Seagull Books
- London: Penguin Books (paperback), 1991, ISBN 978-0140148589

== See also ==
- Nelson Mandela 70th Birthday Tribute
- Anti-apartheid movement
