= Sophiatown (film) =

- Directed by: Pascale Lamche
- Written by: Pascale Lamche
- Produced by: Indra De Lanerolle; Pascale Lamche; Rob Lowdon; James Mitchell; Lebohang Morake
- Starring: Jonas Gwangwa; Abdullah Ibrahim; Nelson Mandela; Hugh Masekela; Dorothy Masuka; Dolly Rathebe; Jürgen Schadeberg
- Cinematography: Dominic Black
- Edited by: Catherine Meyburgh
- Distributed by: Little Bird Productions
- Release date: 2003
- Running time: 82 minutes
- Countries: Ireland; South Africa
- Language: English/Afrikaans

Sophiatown is a 2003 documentary film. Sophiatown in the 1950s was a suburb of Johannesburg, South Africa, where people of all races decided to de facto desegrate in defiance of apartheid. Sophiatown was famous for jazz and black gangsters heavily influenced by American film who spoke a slang called Tsotsitaal.

This era is revisited by some of the artists who lived there and they call back the past in two concerts.
