= Come Back, Africa =

1959 film

- Directed by: Lionel Rogosin
- Written by: Lionel Rogosin; Lewis Nkosi; William Modisane
- Screenplay by: Lionel Rogosin; Lewis Nkosi; William Modisane
- Produced by: Lionel Rogosin
- Starring: Vinah Makeba; Zachria Makeba; Molly Parkin; Miriam Makeba
- Cinematography: Ernst Artaria; Emil Knebel
- Edited by: Carl Lerner
- Music by: Lucy Brown, Chatur Lal
- Distributed by: Lionel Rogosin Films
- Release date: 1959
- Running time: 83 minutes
- Countries: South Africa; United States
- Language: English

Come Back, Africa is a 1959 film, the second feature-length film written, produced, and directed by American independent filmmaker Lionel Rogosin. The film had a profound effect on South African cinema, and remains historically and culturally important as a document preserving the heritage of the townships in South Africa in the 1950s. It may be classified as reportage, documentary, historical or political cinema, since it portrays real events and people. It reveals an interpretation of meaningful social facts and a strong ethical assumption towards human behaviours like racism.

Like Rogosin's feature debut On the Bowery, Come Back, Africa is a scripted film based on a fictional narrative in which actors play invented roles. However, unlike mainstream films and against Hollywood traditions, its actors are street people, improvising lived experiences: they play their own lives or those of people like them. That is why Come Back, Africa is a hybrid of fictional film and documentary: a docufiction. Additionally, it is a rare combination in film history of docufiction and political film.

Both Lionel Rogosin in America and Jean Rouch in France, at the same time, considered themselves as Robert Flaherty's heirs for similar reasons. Both used amateur actors, "street people" playing their own roles in search of truth or to unveil some hidden mystery beyond crude reality: Rogosin, contrary to Flaherty, was sustained by strong ideological beliefs; Rouch, beyond Flaherty, was inspired by surrealism, which he believed to be a useful means to reveal the truth of cinema (the cinéma-vérité) and also an important tool to be used by an ethnographer for scientific research. Following different paths to reach similar results, both converged in ethnofiction with surprising results.

== Synopsis ==
Come Back, Africa comprises a storyline acted out by black South Africans, from whose own experiences the film's events are drawn. Desperate to feed his household, Zachariah, a young Zulu, departs his famine-stricken kraal to work in the Johannesburg gold mines. He eventually settles in one of the squalid apartheid-era townships, only to find himself confronted with a barrage of South Africa's infamous pass laws restricting his every move. Zachariah learns that he cannot seek employment without a pass; paradoxically, he cannot obtain a pass without employment. Meanwhile, his family is consistently threatened with exile or imprisonment if they fail to comply with these draconian regulations.

Zachariah subsequently drifts through a succession of jobs - household servant, garage attendant, waiter, and public labourer – ridiculed, insulted, and ostracised by unfeeling and hostile Afrikaner superintendents. As they struggle to support themselves, Zachariah's spouse Vinah is forced to take up domestic service; she lives on the property of a white landowner, away from her husband. When the latter visits her one lonely evening, he is arrested by the SAP on trespassing charges.

Upon his release from detention, Zachariah discovers that Vinah has been murdered by Marumu, an infamous Sophiatown hoodlum, after resisting his unwanted sexual advances. The portrayal of Zachariah's overwhelming feelings of torment, helplessness, and frustration is intended to capture the resentment of South Africa's indigenous population. Denied basic civil rights, many must weave a treacherous path of survival through the myriad of legal and unofficial racial codes, while their families disintegrate on the townships' violent streets. Some – like Zachariah – are utterly defenceless in this struggle, impossibly torn between apartheid's calculated suppression and the wanton atrocities of organised crime.

== Crew and cast ==
- Produced and directed by: Lionel Rogosin, Lionel Rogosin Films
- Screenplay: Lionel Rogosin, Lewis Nkosi, William 'Bloke' Modisane
- Cinematography: Ernst Artaria, Emil Knebel
- Sound: Walter Wettler
- Music: Lucy Brown
- Editing: Carl Lerner
- Cast: Zacharia Mgabi, Vinah Bendile, Miriam Makeba, Arnold (surname not provided at the time of filming), Aunty (Martha – shebeen queen), Dube-Dube, George Malebye, Marumu, Morris Hugh, Hazel Futa, Lewis Nkosi, Bloke Modisane, Can Themba, Myrtle Berman, Rams, Steven, Piet Beyleveld, Jan Hoogendyk, Alexander Sackville, Sarah Sackville ...
- Featuring the music of Chatur Lal as music director (Indian Tabla Player from India)

== Reception ==
- "...a timely and remarkable piece of cinema journalism: a matter-of-fact, horrifying study of life in the black depths of South African society. Filmed in secret..in constant danger of arrest and deportation, Come Back Africa..looks deep into the private nightmare and social desperation of a man and his people". (Time magazine)
- "Burning with integrity; it is the most damning indictment of apartheid and the pass system that I have ever seen..In a climax of almost unbearable anger and frustration it beats out a question which, though unspoken, must be in the mind of everyone who sees it: How long are we going to allow these appalling conditions to exist?” – Nina Hibbin – Daily Worker (London)
- "If you want to see and understand South Africa, there is no better way than this picture of Johannesburg: the bitterness of the whites, the growing anger of the Negroes and the horror of the shacks and tin shelters of Sophiatown..Extraordinary timeliness". – Archer Winsten, New York Post
- "Highest Recommendation! Extraordinary film, powerfully dramatic, brilliantly photographed, splendidly played against the background of explosive South Africa". – Jesse Zunser, Cue Magazine
- "The very spontaneity of the scenes gives his story illumination, shock, and intense poignancy". – Hollis Alpert, Saturday Review
- “...I have just seen a film that makes me ashamed of being white – ashamed of belonging to a race which can oppress and terrorize people of other colors. It shows how colored men are so hedged about by restrictions and brutal laws that their lives are little better than the lives of animals in a cage. " – Anthony Carthew, Daily Herald
- “...a film which is not so much a work of art but is of vast importance as a contribution to awareness of the gigantic problem of racial conflict existing in South Africa today..It is a fine film, entertaining in many ways, and quite authentic in its presentation..the musical background..is superb...and interspersed among the story scenes are excellent shots of Johannesburg streets, filled with constantly moving tides of Africans, restless, surging forward, overwhelming in their numbers". – Christian Science Monitor
- "Come Back Africa" has been restored by the Cineteca di Bologna and the laboratory L’Imagine Ritrovata with the collaboration of Rogosin Heritage in 2005.

== Awards ==
The film was premiered at the 1959 Venice Film Festival. Rogosin financed and backed Bloke Modisane's escape from South Africa and his transition period in London, where he wrote his book Blame me on History. Rogosin at the same time bribed officials in South Africa and managed to get Miriam Makeba out of the country against the payment of a bond so that she could present the film with him at the Venice Film Festival. The film along with Makeba's singing and "afro" hair-style created a sensation and the film won the prestigious "Italian Critics Award". It was almost impossible to get black artists out of South Africa at the time, and impossible for these artists to make a career outside of the country. Rogosin engaged Makeba under contract, and financed her travels and living expenses in England and the United States. He also hired a publicity agent, and arranged her appearance at the Village Vanguard in New York City and her debut on The Steve Allen Show.

- Italian Critics Award, Venice Film Festival, 1959
- Winner of the award for "the film showing the most significant advance in content means of expression and technique." – The Canadian Federation of Film Societies, Vancouver Film Festival, 1959
- Selected by Time magazine as one of the "Ten Best Pictures of 1960"
- Selected by Chevalier de la Barre, Paris, as "Most Worthy Picture of 1960"

== Filming ==
After the Second World War, Rogosin wanted to make a film that would expose the apartheid system to the world. He made his first film On the Bowery (1956) as a way to prepare for making Come Back, Africa.

Rogosin and his wife Elinor arrived in South Africa in May 1957, and spent six months preparing and getting to know the people and country. He secretly met Myrtle and Marty Berman (organizers in the anti-apartheid movement) who introduced him to the groups fighting against apartheid and to Bloke Modisane, a writer and journalist working for Drum magazine. Modisane then introduced Rogosin to Lewis Nkosi, another young Drum journalist, and other journalists, musicians and writers.

Rogosin, Modisane and Nkosis worked out a simple script with which Rogosin improvised and worked with non-professional actors. The filming was done under the danger of being discovered by the apartheid regime. Rogosin carefully made up different stories for different people so that he was able to film and get the materials out of the country safely. The tiny film crew shot on location in the streets of Johannesburg, Sophiatown and in restricted areas prohibited to whites, where 50,000 African homes were being annihilated to make room for a white suburb called Triumph. Filming finished in October 1959, and Rogosin left South Africa. The editing was done in New York by Carl Lerner, who was receiving the rushes from South Africa.

=== Context ===
Rogosin's crew worked in secret, disguised as a commercial film unit making a musical, and in constant fear of confiscation and deportation. It was one of the first non-musical films, if not the first to document the lives of black people in Africa using native languages.

The South African government attacked Come Back, Africa and banned it from being shown in South Africa.

Beside the Critics' award at the Venice Film Festival, the film won many awards and was a critical success in Europe. It had its biggest impact in France where Madame Yvonne Decaris who ran the legendary Pagode cinema, in Paris, opened the film. It was reviewed by many great French intellectuals such as Roland Barthes. It then went on to be taken up and screened through the French Cinéclubs system; it is estimated that over a million people saw the film in France.

Rogosin opened the Bleecker Street Cinema in New York in the spring of 1960 and premiered Come Back, Africa one week before the Sharpeville massacre.

=== Languages ===
Fanakalo is used for the mine scenes (it is the mining lingua franca), Afrikaans is used by the policeman who arrests Zacharia for a pass offence, IsiZulu is Zacharia's home language, English is used by the intellectuals in the shebeen scene, Sesotho is used by one of the men who had a conversation with Zacharia at the hostel. Setswana was used by the old woman who provided residence for Zacharia and his wife and South African Sign Language was used by the young women who was assisting Zacharia's wife, the young women who was crocheting.

=== Music ===
Rogosin wanted to expose the ordeal of the people but also wanted to capture the culture of the streets. He was passionate about the music and dancing he observed in the townships, so he also had a "story" for the authorities that he was making a street musical / travelogue, which he used to obtain permission to film outdoors. There are scenes with gumboot dancers, penny-whistle musicians, a group singing Elvis Presley's hit Teddy Bear, and a young Miriam Makeba singing in the shebeen scene.

Music Director – Pandit Chatur Lal

=== Related content ===
Lionel Rogosin's diaries of this period are collected in the book Come Back Africa – Lionel Rogosin, A Man Possessed, edited by Peter Davis.

=== "Making of" documentary ===
In 2007, Rogosin's sons Michael and Daniel co-produced a 55-minute "Making of" documentary entitled An American in Sophiatown. The film was directed by Lloyd Ross.

== Home media ==
Milestone Films released a restored Come Back, Africa on DVD and Blu-ray in 2012.
