= Matlhaela Michael Masote =

South African violinist and conductor (1941–2017)

- Born: 7 January 1941; Sophiatown, South Africa
- Died: 26 May 2017 (aged 76); Johannesburg, South Africa
- Resting place: Westpark Cemetery
- Occupations: Musician, conductor
- Notable work: The South African Messiah
- Spouse: Sheila (m. 1971)
- Children: 3, Kutlwano Masote
- Musical career
- Genres: Classical music
- Instrument: Violin

Matlhaela Michael Masote (7 January 1941 – 26 May 2017), also known as Mike "Ntate" Masote and "Monna Wa Mmino" (Music Man), was a violinist, conductor and the founder of the first black youth orchestra in South Africa.

== Early life ==
Masote was born on 7 January 1941 in Sophiatown. He was the third-youngest of eight children. His mother Esther was a domestic worker, and his father Sekolo was a delivery man for a butchery. His siblings were members in the local Methodist Church choir, rehearsing at their home.

Masote developed interest in violin after attending the tour of the violinist Yehudi Menuhin in Johannesburg.

In 1955, his family was forcibly removed from their home by the apartheid regime, and they moved to Soweto.

In Soweto he joined the Jubilee Music School. Masote joined the Ionian ensemble under Khabi Mngoma.

Masote taught himself conducting by sneaking into the Johannesburg City Hall to watch rehearsals of the National Symphony Orchestra. At that time black people were not allowed into the city hall. He paid a janitor to lend a broom and uniform, and went to observe the work of the orchestra conductor during the rehearsals, pretending to sweep the floors.

In 1964, he joined the Johannesburg Bantu Music Festival, becoming a cultural officer. He gave choir trainings and violin lessons, and was rewriting African music into orchestral format.

In 1965, Masote started the Soweto Youth Orchestra, the first black orchestra in South Africa, at Uncle Tom's Hall in Orlando West. Later it would grow into the Soweto Symphony Orchestra.

Masote wished to study music further. After difficulties with applying to tertiary South African institutions, he registered at the Royal School of Music in London. He received a violin teacher licentiate there in 1973.

In 1998 Masote was awarded a Bachelor of Music degree by the University of South Africa, the first black South African to receive it. In 2005 he received an honorary licentiate in music there.

== Prosecutions by apartheid ==
Masote was often stopped and harassed by the police on suspicion of carrying a gun in his violin case. The police made him open the case, and then forced to play as a proof that the violin was not stolen. He played Sarie Marais.

In 1976, he and his wife were jailed under the Terrorism Act. They were released, but continuous harassment and occasional detainments continued.

== Death ==
Masote died of heart failure on 26 May 2017 in Johannesburg. He was buried at Westpark Cemetery.

== Family ==
On Valentine's Day in 1971, Masote married Sheila, daughter of Zephania Mothopeng, former president of the Pan Africanist Congress of Azania. They had three children.

His son Kutlwano Masote is a world-renowned cellist, composer and conductor. He became the first African to receive a scholarship at the Menuhin Academy in Bern, Switzerland.

== Notable works ==
Masote translated Handel's oratorio Messiah into nine South African languages under the name "The Black Messiah". He conducted its first performance in 1983 at the Holy Cross Anglican church in Soweto. In 1996 he created a new version, "The South African Messiah", to commemorate the adoption of the democratic Constitution of South Africa. New version included all eleven official South African languages, by retaining elements of the original English libretto.

== Awards ==
- The Order of Ikhamanga in Bronze for "Outstanding contribution to the development of youth orchestras and choral music in the classical genre in South Africa." (20 April 2006)

== Legacy ==
Masote established five youth orchestras: the Mmabatho Youth Orchestra, the Klerksdorp Youth Orchestra, the Soweto Youth Orchestra, the Thembisa Youth Orchestra and the Seventh Day Adventist Orchestra in Soweto.

The Soweto Youth Orchestra gave birth to the internationally acclaimed Soweto String Quartet, and other successful musicians including Koloane Mantu of the Soweto String Quartet, jazz trumpeter Prince Lengoasa, composer and conductor Mokale Koapeng, founder of Imilonji Ka Ntu choral ensemble George Mxadana.

His other projects and initiatives resulted in the establishment of the Vaal Symphonic Wind Band and the Moretele Recorder Ensemble.

In 2015, a musical theatre "Masote's Dream" was staged at the National Arts Festival in Grahamstown in July 2015. It was written by Dutch playwright Dagmar Slagmolen, with musical direction by Masote's son Kutlwano, and co-produced by the Dutch company Orkater and South African company Performing Arts Centre of the Free State. It was nominated for the Naledi Theatre Award in 2016 in two categories: "best score" and "best cutting edge production".

SABC 2 screened a four-episode drama miniseries "Monna Wa Minno" ("Unsung Hero" in English version of the title) about the life of Michael Masote in 2012. The cast includes Vuyo Dabula as Masote and Lerato Mvelase as his wife Sheila.
