= Ad Donker =

South African book publisher (1933–2002)

- Born: Adriaan Donker; 5 December 1933; Bilthoven, The Netherlands
- Died: 17 July 2002 (aged 68); South Africa
- Occupation: Publisher
- Known for: Founder of AD Donker Publishers

Adriaan Donker (5 December 1933 – 17 July 2002) was a pioneering South African publisher, who was born in the Netherlands and emigrated in 1966 to South Africa, where he founded his own company to produce South African literature.

== Biography ==
Born in Bilthoven, the Netherlands, on 5 December 1933, he grew up in Amsterdam during the Second World War. He learned book publishing from his father, who was a notable Dutch publisher (Ad. Donker, Rotterdam), and was also trained at Collier Macmillan in London and New York City. He emigrated as sales representative to South Africa in 1966, and in 1973 opened his self-titled publishing company, which was committed to publishing South African literature.

Under apartheid, many of Donker's publications were considered "subversive". Despite pressure from government officials, surveillance by the security police, including threats of loss of passport and illegal house searches, Donker adamantly continued publishing social critical works.

He was founder and director of the Centre of Creative Arts in Durban, initiating the international Poetry Festival and The Time of the Writer.

He was awarded an honorary doctorate by the University of Natal in 2000 for his contribution to South African literature.

Donker died at his home in Rooi Els, South Africa, in July 2002, aged 68.

== Publications of AD Donker (Johannesburg) ==
The first publications of black literature in South Africa were under AD Donker Publisher in 1974, with Mongane Wally Serote and Sipho Sepamla. Playwright and author Athol Fugard (Tsotsi) and imprisoned poet Dikobe wa Magole (Baptism of Fire, ISBN 0-86852-051-9) are among the many authors Donker promoted. With his love for literature, he republished forgotten works by Bessie Head (Tales of Tenderness and Power), Olive Schreiner's The Story of an African Farm, Sol T. Plaatje's novel Mhudi and the then banned autobiographical work by Bloke Modisane Blame Me On History.

=== Poetry ===
- Hurry up to it! – Sydney Sipho Sepamla, 1975 (ISBN 0-949937-14-2)
- The Blues in You and Me – Sipho Sepamla, 1976 (ISBN 0-949937-33-9)
- Children of the Earth – Sipho Sepamla, 1983 (ISBN 0-86852-022-5)
- Behold Mama Flowers – Mongane Wally Serote, 1978 (ISBN 0-949937-51-7)
- Tsetlo – Mongane Wally Serote, 1974 (ISBN 0-949937-06-1)
- Yakhal'inkomo – Mongane Wally Serote, 1972 (ISBN 0-86852-045-4)
- It's Time to Go Home – Christopher van Wyk, 1979 (ISBN 0-949937-58-4)
- Prison Poems – Dikobe Wa Mogale, 1992 (ISBN 0-86852-190-6)
- Jol'iinkomo – Mafika Pascal Gwala, 1977 (ISBN 0-949937-34-7)

=== Plays ===
- Marigolds in August – Athol Fugard and Ross Devenish, 1982 (ISBN 0-86852-008-X)

=== Novels ===
- Exiles: A Novel – Rose Zwi, 1984. (ISBN 0-86852-060-8)
- This Time of Year and Other Stories – Sheila Roberts, 1983. (ISBN 0-86852-029-2)

== See also ==
- David Philip Publishers, founded 1971.
- Ravan Press, founded 1971.
