= Alfred Bitini Xuma =

South African doctor, leader and activist (1893-1962)

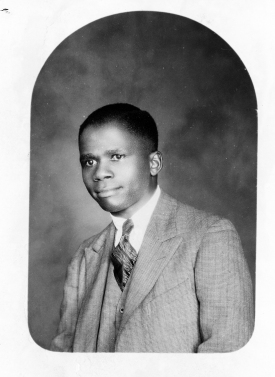
- Xuma, circa 1930

7th President-General of the African National Congress
- In office 1940–1949
- Preceded by: Zacharias Richard Mahabane
- Succeeded by: James Moroka

Personal details
- Born: 8 March 1893 Manzana Village, Transkei
- Died: 27 January 1962 (aged 68)
- Party: African National Congress
- Nickname: AB Xuma

Alfred Bitini Xuma, OLG, commonly referred to by his initials as AB Xuma (8 March 1893 – 27 January 1962), was the first black South African to become a medical doctor, as well as a leader, activist and president-general of the African National Congress (ANC) from 1940 to 1949. He was a member of the African American founded Alpha Phi Alpha fraternity.

== Early life ==
Xuma was born on March 8th, 1893, to parents Abraham Mangali Xuma and Elizabeth Cupase Xuma. He received his education at an Anglican mission school in Manzana, and went on to study at the Clarkebury Institute, where he became a teacher in 1911.

In 1913, Xuma traveled to the United States to pursue higher education. He studied at the Tuskegee Institute in Alabama from 1914 to 1916, after which he went to work in Birmingham, Alabama in order to earn money to pay off his debts from education. He then studied at the University of Minnesota, from which he received a Bachelor of Science in 1920.

== Medical career ==
After receiving his bachelor's degree, Xuma studied at Marquette University in Wisconsin until 1922, and then studied at Northwestern University in Illinois until 1924. He worked at various hospitals, including the Mayo Clinic in Rochester, Minnesota, and received his Doctorate of Medicine in 1926. Xuma then traveled to Hungary, where he studied at Pecs University, and later worked as a surgeon at New St. John's Hospital in Budapest. In 1927, Xuma traveled to Edinburgh, where he received the Licentiate of the Royal College of Physicians, and then returned to South Africa, opening a medical practice in Sophiatown, Johannesburg.

== Political career ==
Although on the left wing of the ANC, Xuma was seen during his leadership as too conservative by an increasingly impatient and activist youth, which he regarded in turn with suspicion. (His letters to colleagues are understood to be full of hostile references to communists.) As such, he was widely regarded as out of touch with the needs and demands of the grassroots.

Nevertheless, it was under his leadership, albeit after having been very cannily lobbied, and in spite of warnings from his colleagues that it would lead to his downfall, that the ANC in 1942 established its Youth League.

A young Nelson Mandela was among the activists present (including Walter Sisulu, Congress Mbata, and William Nkomo) who in 1944 visited his home in Sophiatown to agitate for his acceptance of the league's manifesto and draft constitution. Mandela recalls having been impressed at how "grand" Xuma's house was, as well as by his revitalisation of the ANC: Xuma had succeeded in regularising membership and subscriptions, and had greatly improved the movement's finances. To Mandela, however, and many other young Africans of the time,

he represented the old way of doing things: deputations, statements, committees—gentlemen politics in the British tradition. As a man so recently being groomed to become a 'black Englishman' himself, Mandela understood how all that worked. But now there were new voices around him, offering an increasing militant approach.

Xuma responded very angrily and sarcastically after reading what he called their "high-learned" manifesto, which explicitly criticized the ANC's failure to advance the national cause, as well as its deficiencies in organisation and constitution, and its "erratic policy of yielding to oppression, regarding itself as a body of gentlemen with clean hands." Xuma rounded on the deputation for usurping the authority of the ANC national executive, but refrained from criticizing publicly a cause he had publicly championed. Thus outmaneuvered, he gave the ANC Youth League his blessing, having secured an agreement that the ANC itself would remain the dominant body

== Legacy ==
After his death his book collection was given to Orlando East Public Library by his widow, Madie Hall Xuma. This library was the first purpose built public library in Soweto.

His home currently serves as the Sophiatown Heritage and Cultural Centre.
