= Bath Literature Festival =

Festival in Bath, England

The Bath Literature Festival, held annually in Bath, Somerset, England, was a ten-day literature festival. It was an important date in the national literary calendar, playing host to an array of journalists, novelists, poets, politicians, actors, comedians, writers and biographers between 1995 and 2016. Established in 1995, the Bath Literature Festival has now been incorporated into The Bath Festival, a new multi-arts festival with literature and music at the heart. The festival celebrates its thirtieth anniversary in 2025.

== History ==
The festival was established in 1995, and was supported by Andrew Brownsword and from 2012 was sponsored by The Independent. By 2014 it had become one of the UK's biggest literary festivals.

In 2003 writer and broadcaster Sarah LeFanu became Artistic Director. In 2009, James Runcie became Artistic Director. In 2014, Viv Groskop took over as Artistic Director.

The 2008 Festival included Tariq Ali, Martin Amis, Margaret Drabble, A. C. Grayling and Steven Berkoff. The 2014 festival included 200 authors, including Hanif Kureishi, Rachel Joyce, Michael Rosen, Mark Lawson, Everything But the Girl’s Ben Watt, Mark Hix, Claudia Roden, Kirsty Wark, Alain de Botton, Joanna Trollope, Val McDermid, Lucy Porter, and Jo Caulfield.

Since 2016, the Bath Literature Festival has been incorporated into The Bath Festival, a new multi-arts festival with literature and music at the heart. In 2025, the Bath Literature Festival and Bath Music Festival will run side by side in May. It will be the thirtieth anniversary of the literature festival.
