= Gibson Kente =

South African playwright

- Born: Gibson Mthuthuzeli Kente; 23 July 1932; Duncan Village, Eastern Cape, South Africa
- Died: 7 November 2004 (aged 72); Soweto, South Africa
- Other names: Father of Black Theatre
- Occupations: Playwright; composer; director; producer
- Years active: 1963–2003
- Spouse: Evelyn Nomathemba Kasi (1969–1979)

Gibson Mthuthuzeli Kente (23 July 1932 – 7 November 2004) was a South African playwright, composer, director, and producer based in Soweto. He was known as the Father of Black Theatre in South Africa, and was one of the first writers to deal with life in the South African black townships. He produced 23 plays and television dramas between 1963 and 1992. He is also responsible for producing some of South Africa's leading musicians. Many prominent artists, including Brenda Fassie, owe their first opportunities on stage to him.

== Early life and education ==
Gibson Kente was born on 23 July 1932 in Duncan Village, Eastern Cape raised in Stutterheim by his mother. He was educated at Bethel Training College Seventh-Day Adventist college in Butterworth until he moved to Lovedale Training College to complete his matric. In 1956 Kente moved to Johannesburg to study social work at the Jan H. Hofmeyr School of Social Work.

He never completed his studies; instead he joined a group known as Union of South African Artists (Union Artists) who were based at Dorkay House in central Johannesburg. The Union Artists offered black performers in South Africa training, royalty contracts and fair payment.

== Career ==
In 1963, Kente produced his first play, Manana, The Jazz Prophet, which featured celebrated musicians Caiphus Semenya and Letta Mbulu. The play focused on Manana, a gospel preacher and prophet, whose main concern was to bring everybody to the Christian faith. In 1966, he wrote the musical Sikalo, which blended African gospel and township jazz. The musical was performed at the University of the Witwatersrand Great Hall.

Kente's plays were popular for using township popular culture, slang, fashion, and topical issue to reflect on daily life. His success with his first two plays motivated him to leave the Union Artists to start his own training centre and production company, GK Productions. He trained famous South African artists and entertainers such as Brenda Fassie, Nomsa Nene, and Mbongeni Ngema in the garage of his home in Dube, Soweto. Kente also wrote music for artists such as Miriam Makeba and Letta Mbulu.

Three of his plays drew criticism for being anti-apartheid (Segregation) and were banned: How Long, I Believe and Too Late. He was jailed for one year in 1976 on conclusion of the filming of his play How Long. The film was never released and the master negative of the film was given to the National Film Board in Pretoria. The National Film, Video and Sound Archives is the current custodian of this film. First performed in 1975, his play one-act play Too Late was banned by the Publications Control Board because it dealt with the death of Ntanana, a crippled girl, through brutal police action and apartheid bureaucracy. Another of his plays I Believe, was also banned. Another famous piece is Mama and the load.

In 1989, his Soweto home was firebombed burning early scripts and records. The garage at his home served as rehearsal room, set construction workshop, training centre and storeroom for GK Productions. It is estimated that before his death, Kente wrote 23 plays and three television dramas.

Kente began his last play, The Call, when he was diagnosed HIV positive. It is a musical about a man living with HIV who brings hope to others with the disease.

== Recognition ==
In 1997, the 30-seater Bra Gibson Kente Theatre was opened in Sharpeville. In 1998, the Civic Theatre presented a tribute to him called A Tribute to Gibson Kente.

Associate Professor Emeritus Rolf Solberg of Norway wrote an account of the playwright's life and work in Bra Gib: Father of South Africa's Township Theatre.

== Personal life ==
He married Drum cover-girl Evelyn Nomathemba Kasi in 1969 and they had three children. They were divorced in 1979.

In 2003 he announced that he was HIV Positive. This public admission received praise from South African politicians, including Nelson Mandela. He was admitted into the care of a hospice in Soweto, where he was cared for until he died in his sleep on 7 November 2004.

== Plays ==
- Manana the Jazz Prophet, 1963
- Sikalo, 1966
- Lifa, 1968
- Zwi, 1970
- How Long, 1974
- Our Belief, 1974
- Too Late, 1974
- Can You Take It?, 1977
- Duma (It Thundered), 1980
- Mama and the Load, 1980
- The Call, 2003

== Film ==
- How Long, anti-apartheid feature film based on his play How Long, directed by him and Ben Nanoyi. Not released in South Africa, 1976
