= Jan H. Hofmeyr School of Social Work =

The Jan H. Hofmeyr School of Social Work was the first institution to train black social workers in South Africa.

== History ==
The Jan H. Hofmeyr School of Social Work started operating on January 15, 1941 in Eloff Street, Johannesburg, under directorship of Congregational minister Rev. Ray Phillips. It was opened in 1941 by Ray Phillips and supported by among others, Job Richard Rathebe (trained as a social worker in the USA and member of the South African Institute of Race Relations) and A.B. Xuma (President of the ANC in 1940). The School was funded with help from the Young Men's Christian Association (YMCA) and the Afrikaner philanthropist Hofmeyr. Hofmeyr was Minister of Finance and of Education under Jan Smuts in 1939, and also president of cd municipal building that also housed the Johannesburg City Council's Jubilee Social Centre. From 1949 the school functioned independently from the YMCA (Cobley 1997:148-49).

After the National Party gained power in 1948, the apartheid state stopped subsidizing private education, and the Jan Hofmeyr School was forced to close in 1960 (Gray and Mazibuko 2002:198).

== Alumni ==
Students who had trained at the School included:

- Gibson Kente (1932–2004), playwright
- Ellen Kuzwayo (1914–2006), 1953, educator, social worker, activist, member of the Committee of Ten
- Nomzamo Winifred Zanyiwe Madikizela, 1953, a former wife of Nelson Mandela, social worker, activist
- Joshua Nkomo (1917–1999), ca. 1942, Zimbabwean politician
- Louis Petersen [1917–2002], music administrator
- Eduardo Chivambo Mondlane (1920–1969), class of 1948, educator and founder of the Mozambique Liberation Front (1962)
- Ntombemhlophe Brigalia Bam, 1953, Former Chairperson of the Independent Electoral Commission, activist and social worker Brigalia Bam

== See also ==
- The Bantu Men's Social Centre
