= Viv Groskop =

British journalist, writer and comedian (born 1973)

Viv Groskop (born 8 July 1973) is a British journalist, writer and comedian. She has written for publications including The Guardian, Evening Standard, The Observer, Daily Mail, Mail on Sunday and Red magazine. She writes on arts, books, popular culture and current affairs, identifying as a feminist. Groskop is a stand-up comedian, MC and improviser who was a finalist in Funny Women 2012 and semi-finalist in So You Think You're Funny 2012. She is an agony aunt for The Pool and host of the Mint Velvet clothing podcast "We are Women".

== Life and career ==
Groskop was born in Hampshire and, with her younger sister, grew up in Bruton, Somerset. She won a scholarship to Bruton School for Girls, and later read Russian and French at Selwyn College, Cambridge, graduating with a first-class degree. At age 21, she spent a year in Saint Petersburg as part of her Russian course, and had a relationship with the lead guitarist of a rock band from Ukraine. She has said that as a student she wanted to learn the group's language, while they needed somebody to correct their poor English, particularly in their lyrics.

She has an MA with distinction in Russian Studies from UCL School of Slavonic and East European Studies. From her teens, Groskop believed her surname was Russian, until a Canadian cousin researched her family tree and discovered that the etymology of the Groskop name was Yiddish meaning "fathead", and that her Jewish great-great-grandfather Gershon Groskop had come to Great Britain in the 1860s from Łódź in Poland. Gershon Groskop was also the great-grandfather of television presenter Gethin Jones.

Groskop began her career in journalism at Esquire as an editorial assistant for Rosie Boycott at the age of 22. Groskop joined the Daily Express while Boycott was editor, becoming a columnist on the Sunday Express at the age of 25. She has been described as one of the most successful freelance journalists in the UK, and has twice been short-listed for the Periodical Publishers Association Columnist of the Year.

Groskop is a contributing editor at Russian Vogue. For the UK press, she has interviewed Russian speakers in their mother tongue – among them Marina Litvinenko, widow of the murdered Alexander Litvinenko and Beslan school hostage crisis survivor Fatima Dzgoeva. She has also conducted interviews in French, including one with the surviving daughter of Suite Francaise author Irène Némirovsky.

Groskop's documentaries for BBC Radio 4 include It's Just a Joke, Comrade on Russian satire, and L'origine de L'Origine du monde on the painting by Gustave Courbet. She was a studio guest in the first TV edition of the BBC arts show Front Row. She appears occasionally on the Radio 4 programme Saturday Live, Sky News, Radio 4's Today programme, Any Questions, Front Row, and Woman's Hour, and on Nick Ferrari's LBC 97.3 programme. She blogged about Downton Abbey and Poldark for The Guardian.

She is the author of seven books. Her first book, I Laughed, I Cried, is an account of Groskop performing one hundred comedy gigs in one hundred nights. It is described as "an experiment in doing what you want, even if it is terrifying, without giving up the day job". It was published by Orion on 27 June 2013. Her second book, The Anna Karenina Fix, Life Lessons From Russian Literature, was published by Penguin on 5 October 2017. Her third book, How to Own the Room, Women and the Art of Brilliant Speaking, was published by Transworld on 1 November 2018. She launched a podcast of the same name in October 2018, which was nominated for the Best Business Podcast award at the British Podcast Awards in 2021. Her fourth book, Au Revoir, Tristesse: Lessons in Happiness From French Literature was published in 2020.

Her subsequent books have been Life as you Climb (2021), about ambitious women striving for success while helping others on the way; Happy High Status (2023), on feeling confident without pretending to be someone one is not; and One Ukrainian Summer (2024), an account of her time as a student in Russia.

Groskop was the artistic director of the Bath Literature Festival, the first season under her charge being held in February 2014, and the last in 2016 when "the much-loved chief was waved off with a raucous party".
