= Dugmore Boetie =

South African journalist, writer, and musician (c. 1924–1966)

- Born: Douglas Mahonga Buti c. 1924; Sophiatown, Johannesburg, South Africa
- Died: November 1966 (aged 41–42); Nquthu, KwaZulu-Natal, South Africa
- Occupations: Journalist, writer, and musician
- Notable work: Familiarity is the Kingdom of the Lost (1969)

Dugmore Boetie is the pen name of South African journalist, writer, and musician Douglas Mahonga Buti (c. 1924 – November 1966). He is best known for Familiarity is the Kingdom of the Lost, or Tshotsholoza, a fictionalised autobiographical book first published in 1969.

== Life ==
Many details of Buti's life are unclear, but what is known has been compiled by Benjamin N. Lawrance and Vusumuzi R. Kumalo in the introduction to a 2020 edition of Buti's principal work, Familiarity is the Kingdom of the Lost, or Tshotsholoza.

Buti was born between 1922 and 1926 in Sophiatown Township, a racially integrated community of White, Black, Asian and Coloured residents. His father, Alcott Buti, was amaHlubi and an Ethiopianist lay preacher. His mother, Regina, who was classified under apartheid legislation as Cape Coloured, was from a farming family with Dutch and African heritage who lived in Queenstown. She may have been a washerwoman. Buti does not appear to have been educated beyond primary school, and the defining event of his childhood was the amputation of his leg after he fell from a tree and the wound became infected. It appears Buti travelled widely in his youth and into his early twenties. It was during these years that his musical talents developed, becoming competent on the guitar, piano and piano accordion. He performed with bands in Johannesburg and Durban, possibly performing in Dorkay House.

South Africa formally adopted apartheid in 1948, although Buti appears to have avoided political activities. He did, nonetheless, become acquainted with the anti-apartheid activist and scholar Ruth First. Buti's family were forcibly removed from Sophiatown in 1955, relocating first to Meadowlands and then Soweto. By 1958 he was living in Cape Town, possibly working as a journalist. At this time he was working on a novel that may have been an unpublished work called Give unto Satan and writing poetry. Buti fled South Africa following the Sharpeville massacre, finding his way to Dar es Salaam, Tanganyika in late 1960. He later returned to South Africa.

In the early 1960s, Buti became involved in writing workshops run by Nat Nakasa, Can Themba, Nimrod Mkele and Barney Simon. The first result of this was a short story, "The Last Leg", which was published in 1963 in The Classic, a quarterly magazine founded by Nakasa earlier that year.

As Buti's reputation grew, he was able to secure financial support from Simon, First and Laurens van der Post. This allowed Buti to begin work on a new novel, possibly Tshotsholoza, in 1964. By this time, he was living in Dube Township, and various claims emerged about criminal activity and imprisonments. Another short story was published, first in The Classic in 1965 and then in the London Magazine in October 1966. This was to become the first chapter for his book.

Buti's health began to decline in 1965, and over the next year he was hospitalised repeatedly with lung cancer. During this period he finished the manuscript of Familiarity. He died at the Charles Johnson Memorial Hospital in Nquthu in November 1966. He was buried at Doornkop Cemetery in Soweto on 19 November 1966.

== Familiarity is the Kingdom of the Lost, or Tshotsholoza ==
Familiarity is the Kingdom of the Lost, or Tshotsholoza, tells the story of Duggie, whose life parallels South Africa's transition from informal racial separation in the 1920s to formalised apartheid in the 1950s and 1960s.

=== Plot ===
Duggie is an orphan who lives on the street in Sophiatown. Having fled home after killing his mother in an act of reprisal, he lives in a storm drain, before finding himself in a Cape Town children’s reformatory. Duggie goes on to serve in World War II before coming home, being jailed, becoming a musician, and then getting married and divorced. The story culminates during the forced demolitions and evictions experienced by many Black South Africans in the 1950s and 1960s. Throughout, Duggie's craft and cunning allow him to survive the growing hostility in South Africa.

=== Publication ===
Familiarity is the Kingdom of the Lost was first published in 1969 by Cresset Press in London, with an afterword by Barney Simon. A US edition was published the following year by Dutton Press. The US edition included a preface by Nadine Gordimer.

The book was not published in South Africa until 2005, although it does not appear to have ever been included on the apartheid government’s list of banned books.

The most recent edition, published by Ohio University Press in 2020, restores the book's original title, Tshotsholoza.

The book has received mixed reviews throughout its publication history.

Familiarity is the Kingdom of the Lost, 1969 (Cresset Press)

=== Authorship ===
Barney Simon’s role in bringing Familiarity is the Kingdom of the Lost to publication has been repeatedly debated. Simon continued to revise the text long after Buti's death, and the book's production has been called a process of "collaboration", "co-production", or "cultural appropriation". Some critics contend that the whole book was written by Buti, while others see it as an example of a white South African "discovering" a black voice.

Following Buti's death, his mother assigned agency rights to Simon. By the time of publication, Buti's preferred title, Tshotsholoza, had been replaced and the cover of the first edition suggests co-authorship by crediting the work to "Dugmore Boetie with Barney Simon". Simon's name was only removed from the cover in 2005 when the first South African edition appeared.

In the introduction to the 2020 edition, the editors do not categorically state whether it was solely authored by one or the other, but they believe the text is "largely authored by Buti under the adopted literary identity of Boetie and lightly edited in style and form for publication by Simon."

== Bibliography ==
- 1963. "The Last Leg", The Classic 1(2), pp. 25–31.
- 1966. "Contributors", London Magazine (October), p. 116.
- (with Barney Simon). 1969. Familiarity is the Kingdom of the Lost. London: Barrie & Rockliff: The Cresset Press.
  - 1970. New York: Dutton. Preface by Nadine Gordimer.
- (edited Barney Simon) 1970. Familiarity Is the Kingdom of the Lost: The Story of a Black Man in South Africa. Greenwich: Fawcett.
- (edited Barney Simon) 1984. Familiarity Is the Kingdom of the Lost. Arena Books.
- (edited and with an afterword by Barney Simon) 1993. Familiarity is the Kingdom of the Lost. New York: Basic Books.
- 1994. "Familiarity Is the Kingdom of the Lost", in D. Hirson and M. Trump (eds), The Heinemann Book of South African Short Stories. Oxford: Heinemann, pp. 28–36.
- 2005. Familiarity Is the Kingdom of the Lost. Penguin Classics.
- (edited and with an introduction by Vusumuzi R. Kumalo and Benjamin N. Lawrance) 2020. Familiarity Is the Kingdom of the Lost. Athens: Ohio University Press.
