= Clarkebury =

- Location within Eastern Cape Location within South Africa
- Coordinates: 31.789°S 28.280°E
- Country: South Africa
- Province: Eastern Cape
- District: Chris Hani
- Municipality: Engcobo
- Established: 1830

Area
  - Total: 8.02 km^{2} (3.10 sq mi)

Population (2011)
  - Total: 768
  - Density: 95.8/km^{2} (248/sq mi)

Racial makeup (2011)
  - Black African: 98.2%
  - Coloured: 1.3%
  - White: 0.4%
  - Other: 0.1%

First languages (2011)
  - Xhosa: 98.7%
  - Other: 1.3%
- Time zone: UTC+2 (SAST)
- Postal code (street): 5024
- PO box: 5024
- Area code: 047

Clarkebury is a village in Chris Hani District Municipality in the Eastern Cape province of South Africa. It was established in 1830 as a mission station of the Wesleyan Methodist Missionary Society. It was visited by James Backhouse in March 1839.
