= Dorkay House =

Building in Johannesburg, South Africa

Coordinates: 26.20431°S 28.04225°E

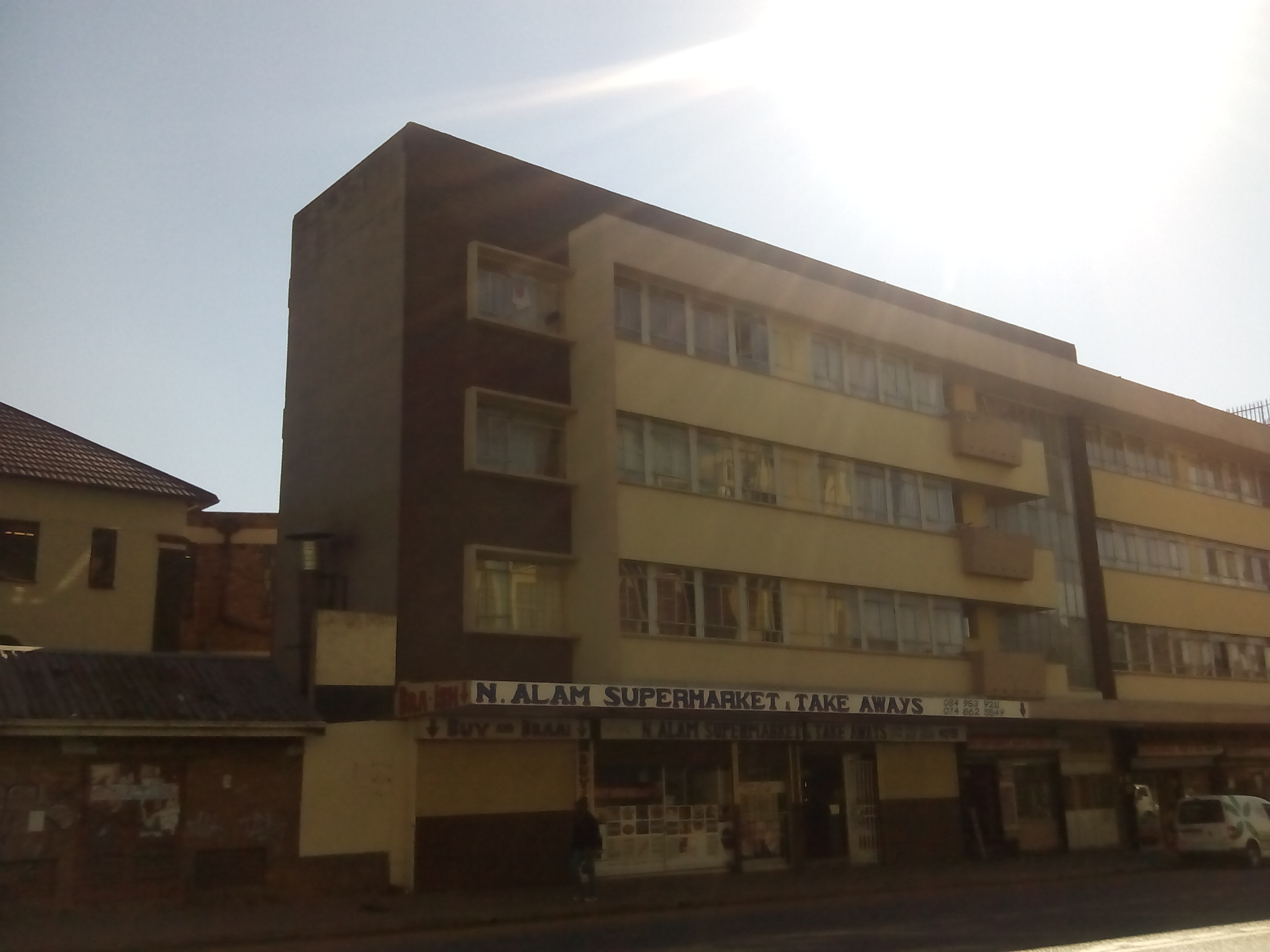
- Dorkay House today
- Interactive map of the Dorkay House area

General information
- Status: Completed
- Location: Eloff Street, Johannesburg, South Africa
- Completed: 1952; 74 years ago

Height
- Roof: 100 metres (330 ft)

Technical details
- Floor count: 3

Dorkay House is situated on Portion 168 of Farm Turnfontein at 5–7 Eloff Street, Johannesburg, South Africa. It was constructed in 1952 and was designed by architect Colman Segal (1923–1988). It takes its name from the original owner, Dora Kotzen. Originally a factory, it is now one of the most important cultural landmarks in South Africa.

== Design ==
Originally built as factory for "cut-make-and-trim" men’s clothing, Dorkay House was planned to have large open plan workrooms. A three-storey building, it was constructed in reinforced concrete and has steel windows.

== Social history ==
After closure of the clothing business, Father Trevor Huddleston wanted to use the building to support local Black musicians. Through funds raised at a farewell concert held in his honour in 1954 at the Bantu Men's Social Club next door, Union Artists were able to acquire a lease. It soon became home to the African Music & Drama Association (1957), and the building rocked to Jazz and Soul – students having lessons, aspirant musicians arriving for a jam session as well as the popular performances that made the south end of Eloff Street lively seven days a week.

The building was organised to house shops at ground-floor level, with a rehearsal stage on the first floor and practice rooms and workshops above. The open-floor plan of the building enabled flexible use.

On any single day it was the place that one could bump into various musicians and artists, such as Dollar Brand, Kippie Moeketsi, Miriam Makeba, Ntemi Piliso, Hugh Masekela, Jonas Gwangwa.

Nelson Mandela and Winnie Mandela are said to have met here.

Dorkay House is one of the most important cultural landmarks in South Africa. It is inextricably linked with the music of the Black artists of the 1950s, a period of great creativity and which had considerable influence on popular music abroad. It gave musicians barred by apartheid from the venues and training schools available to Whites the contracts and exposure that enabled them to develop their talent and obtain recognition.

== Recent history ==
Over the years, Dorkay House has been occupied by various informal business and has been turned into flats for tenants, it is situated in Eloff Street, Johannesburg, on Portion 86 of the Farm Turffontein, which is a taxi rank today.

The conversion to residential flats meant that the rehearsal stage that used to be on the first floor was removed. Queeneth Ndaba formed the Dorkay House Trust in 1989.

== Associated artists ==
Musicians and other artists associated with Dorkay House include: Dolly Rathebe, Mara Louw, Thandi Klaasen, Hugh Masekela, Abigail Kubweka, Letta Mbulu, Miriam Makeba, Abdullah Ibrahim, Sophie Mgcina, Jonas Gwangwa, Caiphus Semenya, Queeneth Ndaba, Timothy Ndaba, Patience Gqwabe, Kippie Moeketsi, Ntemi Piliso, Gwigwi Mrwebi, Dudu Pukwana, Pinise Saul, Wilson Sitgee, Zacks Nkosi, Sipho Mabuse, Prince Mfiki, Thabo Motsomai, Dugmore Boetie, Unathi Hans, Ashante Mpobole.

== Associated bands ==
The following bands and organisations are among those associated with Dorkay House: Huddlestone's Jazz Band, African Jazz Pioneers, Phoenix Players Theatre Company, African Music & Drama Association (AMDA), Union of South African Artists (USAA)

USAA was also known as Union Artists, and was founded by Ian Bernhardt.

AMDA promoted black theatrical plays such as The Train by Gibson Kente and The Island by Athol Fugard, John Kani and Winston Ntshona.

== Heritage status ==
Dorkay House is more than 60 years old, so is considered a heritage resource, historically and culturally significant for the following reasons:

- Dorkay House was home to the African Music & Drama Association, which sought to promote the interests of Black musicians and artists during apartheid
- Numerous well-known artists and bands rehearsed and played at Dorkay House
- Dorkay House was a hub of Jazz and Soul music for Johannesburg but also for South Africa
- Nelson and Winnie Mandela are said to have met at Dorkay House
- Dorkay House was a landmark building for the music community of the city and so an integral part of popular culture in the 1950s and 1960s
