= St Peter's College, Johannesburg =

Private & day school in Off Maxwell Drive, Sunninghill, Gauteng, South Africa

Coordinates: 26°01′58″S 28°05′13″E

St Peter's College
- St Peter's College school crest
- Off Maxwell Drive; Sunninghill, Gauteng; South Africa

Information
- School type: Private & Day school
- Motto: Cum dubitas, sapienter appare
- Denomination: Anglican
- Established: 14 January 1998; 28 years ago
- Headmaster: Mr Brian Armitage
- Exam board: IEB
- Staff: 100 full-time
- Grades: 8–12
- Age: 14 to 18
- Enrollment: 700 boys and girls
- Language: English
- Schedule: 07:20-14:30
- Campus: Urban Campus
- Campus type: Suburban
- Colours: Blue; Red; Gold
- Website: www.stpeters.co.za

St Peter's College is a private, Anglican and English medium co-educational high school situated in the town of Sandton in the Gauteng province of South Africa.

== History ==
St Peter's College was founded in 1998 as a response to the shortage of independent high schools in the area.

The college was opened under a former headmaster of St Alban's College, Ronnie Todd, who was later succeeded by Graham Howarth, who served for 12 years. Rui Morais, who was appointed headmaster in December 2015, joined the college in January 2003.
