= The Bantu Sports Club =

Sports venue in Johannesburg, South Africa

The Bantu Sports Club was built on land donated in 1925 by Howard Pim in Johannesburg, South Africa. The Sports Club comprised a club house, tennis courts, football (soccer) fields, and stands for 5,000 spectators (soccer stadium).
