= Sarah LeFanu =

Scottish academic and author (born 1953)

Sarah LeFanu FRSL
- Born: Sarah Antoinette LeFanu; August 6, 1953 (age 73); Aberdeen, Scotland
- Occupations: Author and academic

Sarah Antoinette LeFanu (born 6 August 1953) is a Scottish author and academic.

== Biography ==
Sarah Antoinette LeFanu was born in Aberdeen, Scotland. She worked as an editor for the Women's Press, and taught classes on feminism and science fiction at the City Lit Centre in London.

From 2004 to 2009, LeFanu was artistic director of the Bath Literature Festival.

=== Publications ===
LeFanu edited the 1985 volume Despatches from the Frontiers of the Female Mind, and in 1988 she published In the Chinks of the World Machine: Feminism and Science Fiction, an analysis of contemporary science-fiction writers, particularly women. Prominent among these were Suzy McKee Charnas, Ursula K. Le Guin, Joanna Russ, and James Tiptree Jr. Reviewing the volume for Science Fiction Studies, Veronica Hollinger wrote that it was "detailed and wide-ranging, frequently incisive, and always entertaining". In her writing, LeFanu argued that science fiction had provided a means for women writers to overcome the patriarchal conventions of conventional fiction, and thereby to speak in their own voices.

She also edited the collection of short stories How Maxine Learned to Love Her Legs and Other Tales of Growing Up (Aurora Metro Books, 1995), with contributors including Hilary Bailey, Souad Faress, Bonnie Greer, Kirsty Gunn, Kate Pullinger, Ravinder Randhawa, Michèle Roberts, and many others.

LeFanu wrote a biography of Rose Macaulay that was published in 2003.

LeFanu and Stephen Hayward co-edited the 1990 anthology Colours of a New Day: Writing for South Africa. The volume was inspired by the international tribute concert to imprisoned anti-apartheid revolutionary Nelson Mandela on his 70th birthday in 1988.

Her memoir/biography of postcolonial Africa, S Is for Samora: a lexical biography of Samora Machel and the Mozambican dream, was published in 2012.

In 2020, she published Something of Themselves, a biographical volume about Arthur Conan Doyle, Mary Kingsley, and Rudyard Kipling in South Africa in 1900 during the Boer War. The book was described as a "splendidly well-written page-turner" by The Times Literary Supplement.

== Awards ==
LeFanu was elected a Fellow of the Royal Society of Literature in 2025.
