= William Modisane =

South African writer, actor and journalist (1923–1986)

- Born: 28 August 1923; South Africa
- Died: 1 March 1986 (aged 62)
- Occupations: Writer, journalist, actor
- Years active: 1923–1986

William Modisane (28 August 1923 – 1 March 1986), better known as Bloke Modisane, was a South African writer, actor and journalist.

== Biography ==
William "Bloke" Modisane, the eldest son of Joseph and Ma-Willie Modisane, grew up in Sophiatown, a multiracial suburb in Johannesburg, South Africa. His father was murdered and his sister died of malnutrition. To make ends meet, his mother ran a shebeen. As Modisane would write in his autobiography: "My mother wanted a better life for her children, a kind of insurance against poverty by trying to give me a prestige profession, and if necessary would go to jail whilst doing it."

He joined Drum magazine as a journalist and became one of "the Drum Boys" during Drum's halcyon days in the 1950s, along with Henry Nxumalo, Can Themba, Es'kia Mphahlele and Lewis Nkosi. Modisane was also the jazz critic at Drum's sister publication, the weekly tabloid Golden City Post.

His nickname of "Bloke" was inspired a character in the Leslie Charteris novels featuring "The Saint".

Modisane tried to facilitate non-racial progress in the arts by making concerts and theatre available to Black audiences and tried to further the efforts of the Arts Federation and the Union of South African Artists, both of which were non-racial.

He wrote a number of short stories that were published in Drum. One such story, "The Situation", derived from the Tsotsitaal (slang) for educated Blacks who rise above their station (i.e. situated above their station) but do not really fit into their new milieu. (Don Mattera mentioned this when describing the journalists: "There was a definite class division. We were in the streets, and they were in the desks. And we used to call such people situations.")

Modisane found an outlet in acting. He joined the African Theatre Workshop and played in the first production of Athol Fugard's No-Good Friday (1958).

He shared the writing credits on Come Back, Africa, a 1959 film filmed mainly in Sophiatown.

Becoming frustrated by the political situation and oppression under the apartheid regime, Modisane moved in 1959 to England, where in 1963 his autobiography, Blame Me on History, was published. This detailed his despair at the bulldozing of Sophiatown (mirroring Can Themba's short story "Requiem for Sophiatown") and his frustration and anger with apartheid. As a result, the book was banned in South Africa in 1966.

Modisane continued acting and had a leading role in Jean Genet's play The Blacks at the Royal Court Theatre in London. He appeared in an uncredited role in the 1964 movie Guns at Batasi, which starred Richard Attenborough, John Leyton, and Mia Farrow. In the 1968 action classic Dark of the Sun, Modisane had a small but memorable supporting role as Corporal Kataki, a sensitive soldier caught up in the rage and horror of the 1960s Congo civil wars. This particular film starred Rod Taylor, Kenneth More, and Yvette Mimieux. It was a major box-office success when first released.

In the early 1960s Modisane settled in Dortmund, West Germany, where he died in 1986 at the age of 63.

== Books ==
- Blame Me on History, Ad. Donker, 1986, ISBN 0-86852-098-5
- De Wet is blank, Van Loghum Slaterus, 1965 (Dutch translation of Blame Me on History)

== See also ==
- List of South African writers
