= Madie Hall Xuma =

South African politician (1894–1982)

Personal details
- Born: 3 June 1894
- Died: 10 September 1982 (age 88)
- Spouse: A. B. Xuma
- Education: Shaw University; Teachers' CollegeWinston-Salem; Columbia University

Madie Hall Xuma (3 June 1894 – 10 September 1982) was an African American educator and social activist who emigrated to South Africa. She was called a 'mother of the nation'. Her husband, A. B. Xuma, was a president of the African National Congress (ANC) from 1940 to 1949.

== Early life and education ==
Xuma was born Madie Beatrice Hall in Winston-Salem, North Carolina in 1894. Xuma was one of four children of H. H. Hall, the only African-American medical doctor in the Winston-Salem at the time, and his wife Ginny Cowan Hall who was a real estate entrepreneur. At first, she intended to become a medical doctor like her father and her brother. She was admitted in Howard University College of Medicine after finishing normal school training at Shaw University. This admittance was rejected by her father because of sexual assault incident which happened to black female doctor. Then, she taught at Winston-Salem Public School and Mary Mcleod Bethune Daytona-Cookman College. She obtained a Bachelor of Science in education from Teachers' College in Winston-Salem in 1937 and a Master of Arts degree in education from Teachers College, Columbia University in 1938. She was also an executive secretary for the Young Women's Christian Association (YWCA) in North Carolina and Virginia

== Life after meeting A. B. Xuma ==
She was still studying towards a master's degree in education at Columbia University when she met the widowed Alfred Bitini Xuma who was visiting United States in 1937–1938. Despite her aching interest to depart to South Africa, her scheduled embarkation on 5 October 1939 was delayed indefinitely because of the war. Because of a suggestion from her husband, Xuma went on to study social work at Atlanta University to wait for the embarkation. She and A. B. Xuma married in Cape Town on 18 May 1940, a day after her arrival there.

Soon after her arrival, she produced a popular musical about the advancement of African American life to South African people and proposed a follow-up play entitled The Green Pastures about black liberation. During the 1940s, she often gave speeches about the history of slavery and the use of brainwashing to make black people believe that they are inferior and accept their servant status. These talks were usually given to groups, such as the Bantu Nurses Association and Daughters of Africa. She also created a play to gather funds for the ANC entitled American Negro Review: The Progress of a Race which based on a play in Winston-Salem, North Carolina with a cast that included Marion Anderson. This play was popular and raised over £200 for the ANC.

She was the first president of the African National Congress Women's League, serving from 1943 to 1949. She successfully advocated full membership and voting rights for women in the ANC. She assisted in the foundation of the Zenzele self-help movement clubs for women's enrichment, whose design she took from her experience with American clubs for black women. In 1951, she affiliated the Zenzele with the world YWCA, though with objection from the South African YWCA, which denied black women membership and the South African Government. She was elected as president of the national council of the South African Young Women's Christian Association on 1955.

In February 1963, a year after her husband's death in 1962, she returned to Winston-Salem, North Carolina, and lived there until her death on 10 September 1982.
