= The Suit (short story) =

- Short story by Can Themba
- Country: South Africa
- Language: English
- Genre: Short story

Publication
- Published in: The Classic
- Publication type: Journal
- Publisher: Nat Nakasa
- Media type: Print
- Publication date: 1963

"The Suit" is a short story by the South African writer Can Themba. It was first published in 1963 in the inaugural issue of The Classic, a South African literary journal founded by Nat Nakasa and Nadine Gordimer. On publication, the story was banned by the apartheid regime. "The Suit" was adapted for the stage by Mothobi Mutloatse and Barney Simon in 1994, and has been adapted into a short film of the same name, written and directed by Jarryd Coetsee and premiered in 2016.

== The story ==
The story takes places in Sophiatown, a township of Johannesburg, in the early 1950s, shortly before the apartheid regime forcibly removed non-whites from the area to make way for white resettlement under the Group Areas Act and the Natives Resettlement Act, 1954. Philemon, a doting husband who works for a lawyer, prepares breakfast in bed for his beautiful wife, Matilda whom he calls Tilly. He does this every day, taking deep pleasure in serving his wife rather than the whites whom he is obliged to serve under apartheid. Every morning is much the same: he readies himself, cooks and wakes Matilda, who refuses to let him wait around to clean up after her. Philemon and Matilda share a communal lavatory with thirty other people who live in a backyard slum which was typical in Sophiatown. Once dressed, Philemon leaves to catch his bus.

This morning, Philemon meets up with his friend, old Mr. Maphikela, in town. Maphikela reluctantly informs Philemon that Matilda has been visited by a young man every morning for the last three months. Devastated, Philemon takes the bus back to Sophiatown and discovers Matilda in bed with her young lover. Philemon pretends not to acknowledge the discovery and scratches through the cupboard, telling Matilda that he was almost at work when he realised that he had left his pass at home and thus returned to fetch it. Matilda’s lover leaps out of the window and flees naked down the street — leaving his suit draped over a chair.

Philemon regards the suit and tells Matilda that he notices that they have a visitor. Philemon commands Matilda to treat the suit with the same hospitality that she would show to a guest: it will share meals with them, it will share their bedroom, it will go for walks with them, etc. If she refuses, he says that he will kill her. For the first time in his life, Philemon goes to a shebeen (an illegal speakeasy), where he stays all day, leaving Matilda alone with her thoughts and fears.

When Philemon returns, he finds that Matilda has cleaned and spruced up their dingy home. She even wears a beautiful new dress and has prepared dinner. Unmoved, Philemon scolds his wife: where is their visitor? Matilda retrieves the suit and prepares a plate of food for it. This is how it should be from now on, Philemon tells her. Time passes, and Matilda’s continued punishment wears on her. Desperate for an escape, she joins a cultural club organized by the local Anglican Mission at the Church of Christ the King in Ray Street (incidentally the same street in which the writer Can Themba lived at Number 111). She finds catharsis among the other married women in the club.

She invites her new friends to come to her home the following Sunday. She spends the entire week preparing for the party. Just before Matilda serves the meal, Philemon orders her to bring out the party’s guest of honor: the suit.

As her guests chitter about this odd behavior, Matilda begs her husband to put her punishment on hold, but he refuses. After she is properly embarrassed, Philemon goes with her friends to a shebeen. When he returns home, he is devastated to find Matilda curled up with the suit, dead.

== Adaptations ==
"The Suit" has been adapted for the stage and film.

=== Theatre ===
South African writer and publisher Mothobi Mutloatse and playwright Barney Simon adapted the story into a play by the same name, first presenting it in November 1994 at Johannesburg’s Market Theatre. Marie-Hélène Estienne and Peter Brook presented their French translation/adaptation of the play, Le costume, at Théâtre des Bouffes du Nord in Paris in 1999; the production toured the world. They revisited the play, returning it to its original English and incorporating the music direction of Franck Krawczyk, and presented their new version of The Suit in Paris in April 2012. It began its international tour in May 2012, continuing into 2014.

=== Film ===
South African film-maker Jarryd Coetsee adapted the short story into a screenplay and directed a short film adaptation, The Suit, which held its African premiere on 12 July 2016 at the Old Fort of Zanzibar as part of the 19th Zanzibar International Film Festival where, although it was not in the official competition, was given a Special Mention by the jury. The film features Tony Award-winning South African actor John Kani as Mr. Maphikela, his son Atandwa Kani as Philemon, and Phuthi Nakene as Matilda.

== See also ==
- The Suit (2016 film), a short film adaptation, written and directed by Jarryd Coetsee.
