= Alf Kumalo =

South African photographer (1930–2012)

Alfred Khumalo (5 September 1930 – 21 October 2012), better known as Alf Kumalo, was a South African documentary photographer and photojournalist.

== Overview ==
Kumalo was born in Utrecht near Newcastle in the province of KwaZulu-Natal. He first worked in a garage doing various jobs and then started freelancing for various publications, selling his photographs where he could. He did a lot of work for the Bantu World.

In 1956, he found a permanent position at the Golden City Post and later received assignments from The Star, a South African daily, Drum magazine, and international publications like The New York Times. He was among the photographers who captured the Sharpeville massacre on 21 March 1960.

In 1963, while working for Drum, he was selected together with Harry Mashabela to go and shoot a story about African students in the Iron Curtain countries. The two made the front cover of the next edition of the magazine, "Drum men go to Europe".

While in London, he interviewed Cassius Clay and then found out that he had won first place in a photographic competition. The prize was an Austin Cambridge motor car. Kumalo had been encouraged to enter by David Hazelhurst, the editor of Drum.

Kumalo had used his African names Mangaliso Dukuza because he wanted the judging to be impartial and not influenced by his reputation. A picture of him and his award was published by the Star on its front page. "A lot of black people talked about it for days afterwards, because in those days they would only get on to the front pages of white newspapers if they were thieves."

Despite the prospect of being arrested and assaulted, Kumalo kept on taking pictures, sometimes at personal cost. David Hazelhurst recalled:

One day in 1963, when I was editor of Drum magazine, Alf Khumalo walked into my office carrying a picture. It showed a burly policeman delivering a vicious kick between the legs of reporter Harry Mashabela from behind. Such was the power of the kick you could see the shape of his boot exploding through the front of Mashabela' trousers.

It was the year of the jackboot of John Vorster, habeas corpus had disappeared, the 90-day-detention without trial Act had given policemen a license to kill and assault behind closed doors with impunity.

The police hated journalists – and photographers in particular, for their pictures portrayed the truth about an evil system, and Kumalo, despite warnings, risked a severe beating to take the Mashabela picture. He had tried to sell it to several papers with no success.

Hazelhurst splashed the picture across two pages of Drum.

Over the years Kumalo photographed and documented many of the historic moments in recent South African history. These include the Treason Trial, the Rivonia Trial, the emergence of Black Consciousness, the Student Uprising of 1976 and the Codesa talks. This was despite numerous periods of detention, arrests and official harassment.

His work has appeared in international newspapers like The Observer, The New York Times, New York Post, and the Sunday Independent. Locally, he also worked for Drum magazine and the long-defunct Rand Daily Mail.

To assist the upcoming generation of South African photographers, Kumalo opened a photographic school in Diepkloof Soweto in 2002. The school offered nine-month courses designed to train photographers from disadvantaged backgrounds.

He died on 21 October 2012.

== Books ==
- Mandela: Echoes of an era / by Kumalo; text by Es'kia Mphahlele, Penguin, 1990, ISBN 0-14-014316-5
- Alf Kumalo: South African Photographer, Itala Vivan and Kumalo, Leonardo arte, ISBN 88-7813-384-1
- Through My Lens: A Photographic Memoir, Kumalo, text by Tanya Farber, 2009, ISBN 978-0624044673
- 8115: A Prisoner's Home, Kumalo; text by Zukiswa Wanner, Penguin, 2010, ISBN 9780143538370

== Exhibitions ==
=== Solo exhibitions ===
- 2004 – 59th Session of the United Nations General Assembly in New York City – a collection of his life's work – the exhibition was much acclaimed
- 2012 - The Struggle Continues - Sibisi Gallery - A collection of photographs of the Soweto Uprising. Exhibition opened on June 16 (Youth Day, South Africa).

=== Group exhibitions ===
- 2001 – Soweto – A South African Myth – Photographs from the 1950s (by Alf Khumalo, Ernest Cole and Jürgen Schadeberg). The core of the exhibition is the student uprising of 1976. This includes some of Peter Magubane's work.
- 2002 – Shooting Resistance: South African Photography 1976 – 1994 – The exhibition documented the period of upheavals that began with the student-led Soweto uprising of 1976 and culminated in the collapse of the apartheid regime and the introduction of democratic elections in 1994. Included were photographs by Kumalo, Jürgen Schadeberg and Peter Magubane.
- 2006 – Madiba: Public and Private – Nelson Mandela Foundation, Johannesburg. Works by photographers Kumalo and Jürgen Schadeberg. Schadeberg's photos are of the public images of Mandela from the 1950s, during the Defiance Campaign and before Mandela's imprisonment, while Kumalo's are of Mandela's private life, particularly of his family. Many of Kumalo's pictures were taken of Mandela's growing family, to send to Mandela in jail.

== Awards ==
- 2004 – South African Order of Ikhamanga in Silver for "his excellent contribution to documentary photography and journalism in South Africa".
- 2005 – South African National Editors Forum "Nat Nakasa Award for Media Integrity" for displaying "courageous journalism throughout his professional career".
