= Bob Gosani =

South African photographer (1934–1972)

Bob Gosani (1934–1972) was a South African photographer.

== Career ==
Gosani started off at Drum magazine as a messenger but soon moved to the photographic department where he became Jürgen Schadeberg's darkroom assistant. He later became one of Drum's best photographers.

Schadeberg said that "Gosani stood out because in the early 1950s good black photographers and press photographers in particular were unheard of".

Some of his pictures have become iconic images of the 1950s in South Africa e.g. the picture of Women during the Defiance Campaign in 1952, Nelson Mandela sparring with his boxing club's star boxer of the time, Jerry Moloi (taken on the rooftop of the South African Associated Newspapers office in Johannesburg) and Nelson Mandela outside court in 1958, (triumphant because the prosecution had withdrawn charges in the Treason Trial).

Perhaps his most famous sequence of pictures was the sequence he took of the humiliating and degrading Tauza dance that naked prisoners were forced to perform in the courtyard of the notorious Johannesburg prison, The Fort, in Hillbrow. This dance was a humiliating way of ensuring that the prisoners were not smuggling any weapons or contraband into their cells after a day's hard labour. It essentially involved thrusting their rectums up into the air for inspection by the warders. Gosani managed to photograph the Tauza dance secretly from the top floor of a nurses' home overlooking the prison. As a result of the pictures being published in Drum, there was a public outcry and the apartheid government was forced to act.

== Publications ==
=== Publications by Gosani ===
- Tauza - Bob Gosani's People. Bedfordview: Mutloatse Arts Heritage Trust, 2005. ISBN 978-1-77007-177-3. Compiled and edited by Mothobi Mutloatse, Jacqui Masiza and Lesley Hay-Whitton.

=== Publications with contributions by Gosani ===
- Drum: a Venture in the new Africa. London: Collins, 1956. By Anthony Sampson. Photographs by Gosani and Jurgen Schadeberg.
  - Drum: the making of a magazine. Johannesburg: Jonathan Ball Publishers, 2005. ISBN 9781868422111.
- In/sight: African Photographers, 1940 to the Present. New York: Solomon R. Guggenheim Museum, 1996. ISBN 9780810968950. With an introduction by Clare Bell and essays by Okwui Enwezor, Olu Oguibe, and Octavio Zaya. Photographs by Gosani, Cornélius Yao Azaglo Augustt, Oladélé Ajiboyé Bamgboyé, Zarina Bhimji, Gordon Bleach, Nabil Boutros, Cloete Breytenbach, Salla Casset, Mody Sory Diallo, Mohammed Dib, Kamel Dridi, Touhami Ennadre, Mathew Faji, Rotimi Fani-Kayode, Samuel Fosso, Jellel Gasteli, Meïssa Gaye, Christian Gbagbo, David Goldblatt, Ranjith Kally, Seydou Keita, Peter Magubane, Santu Mofokeng, G.R. Naidoo, Lamia Naji, Gopal Naransamy, Lionel Oostendorp, Ricardo Rangel, Malick Sidibé, and Iké Udé. Catalogue of an exhibition held at the Solomon R. Guggenheim Museum, May–September, 1996.
