= Have You Seen Drum Recently? =

- Directed by: Jürgen Schadeberg
- Written by: Richard Beynon
- Produced by: The Schadeberg Movie Company
- Starring: Miriam Makeba; Stan Motjuwadi; Can Themba; Thoko Thomo
- Cinematography: Tony Mander; André Pienaar
- Edited by: Sharron Hawkes
- Release date: 1989
- Running time: 77 minutes
- Country: South Africa
- Language: English

Have You Seen Drum Recently? is a 1989 film which uses photographs from the Drum archives to tell the story of the magazine and documents its contribution to the cultural and political life of South Africa.

In the 1950s, Drum focused on urban blacks living in a white-dominated apartheid world. It contained articles about the township jazz scene, crime, fiction and sport and documented the hopes, aspirations and despair of the urban, educated black sophisticate.

Directed by Jürgen Schadeberg, the film includes such images as Oliver Tambo as a lawyer, Trevor Huddleston demonstrating against the demolition of Sophiatown, Nelson Mandela sparring in the boxing ring, Chief Luthuli the Nobel Prize winner and the singer Miriam Makeba.

The background music is based on the music of the 1950s, including big band, jazz, swing, kwela and penny whistle.
