= Casey Motsisi =

South African writer and journalist (1932–1977)

- Born: Karabo Moses Motsisi; 1932; Johannesburg, South Africa
- Died: 1977 (aged 44–45); South Africa
- Other name: Casey "Kid" Motsisi
- Education: Madibane High School
- Occupations: Writer and journalist
- Known for: Drum columnist

Karabo Moses Motsisi (1932–1977), better known as Casey Motsisi or Casey "Kid" Motsisi, was a South African short-story writer and journalist.

== Biography ==
Casey Motsisi was born in Western Native Township (later Westbury) in Johannesburg, South Africa, in 1932. He attended Madibane High School along with Stanley Motjuwadi. Can Themba was his History and English teacher and became a life-long mentor. Motsisi attended a teaching college at Pretoria Normal. He and Motjuwadi were co-editors of the school magazine, the Normalite. Motsisi was expelled from the college for refusing to reveal the name of the author of a controversial article in the magazine (according to Motjuwadi, the article was written by Basil “Doc” Bikitsha). After leaving teaching college, he worked for at the short lived newspaper Africa (where Can Themba was the editor).

Motsisi was a reporter for Drum magazine until 1962, and then left to work for The World, returning to Drum in 1974. He wrote the regular "Bugs" column, which was humorous and satirical, featuring discussions and conversations between two bed bugs. He also wrote the "On the Beat" column, which centred Motsisi's observations of daily life in shebeens and townships. Motsisi wrote about everyday life for Black South Africans to make cutting social and political commentary about the injustice of apartheid.

Motsisi's style borrowed heavily from that of Damon Runyon, using "Americanese" and Tsotsitaal (local township slang). The stories he wrote were based on his extensive knowledge of the Sophiatown shebeen culture, depicting a variety of township types, such as Aunt Peggy, the shebeen queen, and a variety of rogues, including Kid Playboy and Kid Hangover.

Motsisi also contributed to The Classic, a journal edited by a fellow Drum journalist Nat Nakasa.

The Drum Decade contains a number of articles by Motsisi, including:

- "If Bugs Were Men"
- "Johburg Jailbugs"
- "On the Beat" [Kid Hangover]
- "On the Beat" [Kid Playboy]
- "On the Beat" [Kid Newspapers]
- "Riot"

== Books ==
- Casey & Co: Selected Writings of Casey "Kid" Motsisi, edited by Mothobi Mutloatse, Ravan Press, 1978, ISBN 0-86975-088-7
- Riot :writings of Casey "Kid" Motsisi

== See also ==
- List of South African writers
- Mike Nicol, Good-Looking Corpse: World of Drum - Jazz and Gangsters, Hope and Defiance in the Townships of South Africa, London: Secker & Warburg, 1991. ISBN 0-436-30986-6
