= Spokes Mashiyane =

Johannes "Spokes" Mashiyane (born Vlakfontein (Mamelodi), Pretoria 20 January 1933; died at Baragwanath Hospital of cirrhosis of liver 9 February 1972) was regarded as one of the greatest pennywhistle artists who graced the South African kwela music scene from the 1950s to (approximately) the 1970s. Arriving on the pennywhistle band scene as a juvenile domestic servant from the northern Sotho communities in the Transvaal alongside contemporaries of Alexandra boys such as Lemmy Mabaso, Barney Rachabane, Elias and Jack Lerole. He stated that the pennywhistle's simplicity allowed for greater freedom to bend and blend notes. The success of his recordings provided significant revenue for his recording company, Gallo Record Company, to which he had switched in 1958. His success gained international notice by the 1960s - he played with Bud Shank among others during their visit to South Africa - and in July 1965 he was invited to the Newport Folk Festival. This festival gained notoriety for the Electric Dylan controversy, but Spokes performance at the festival did receive notice and praise from Robert Shelton. Spokes's work also had an influence on the Music of Zimbabwe. He claimed that the inspiration for his songs were from his dreams. He played with other kwela greats of his time and his music is enjoyed by many to this day. He married his wife Mary in 1964, and they had two sons, Frederick and Eugene.

In 1989, South African band Mango Groove released Special Star as a tribute to Mashiyane.

== Discography ==
Contributing artist

- The Rough Guide to the Music of South Africa (1998, World Music Network)

== See also ==
- The Suit (2016 film), a short film set in Sophiatown directed by Jarryd Coetsee and featuring music by Spokes Mashiyane.
