= Atandwa Kani =

South African actor

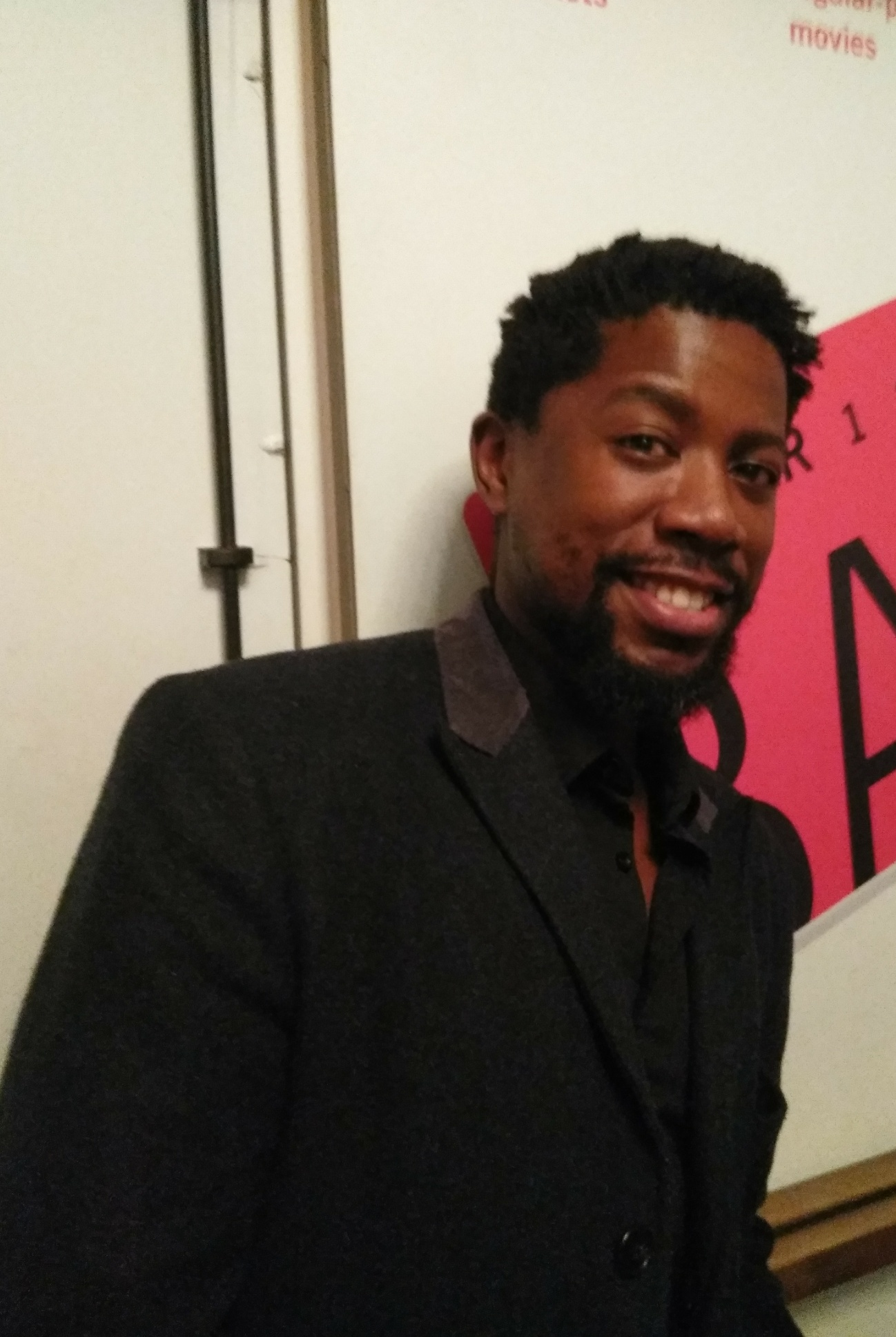
- Kani in 2018
- Born: Atandwa Duduza Yiduthi Kani; 6 June 1984 (age 42); Gqeberha, South Africa
- Education: University of the Witwatersrand (BA); New York University (MFA)
- Occupation: Actor
- Years active: 2007–present
- Notable work: Tumelo in Life Is Wild; Ariel in The Tempest; Black Panther
- Spouse(s): Thembisa Mdoda (m. 2012; div. 2015) Fikile Mthwalo (m. 2015; div. 2023)
- Father: John Kani

Atandwa Kani (born 6 June 1984) is a South African actor. He is the son of actor John Kani.

== Early life ==
Kani was born on 6 June 1984, in Port Elizabeth, Eastern Cape. His introduction to the entertainment industry began early in his life, as he observed and learned from his father, who delved into scripts for his acting roles and often took him to theater performances. These early experiences greatly influenced Kani, inspiring him to pursue a career similar to his father's. He pursued his education at the University of the Witwatersrand (Wits), where he focused on theater performance and actively participated in various school productions. Graduating in 2008, he attained an Honours degree in theatrical performance. In 2019, Kani was in the process of completing a Master of Fine Arts (MFA) in acting at New York University Tisch School of the Arts.

== Career ==
Kani made his international stage debut in The Tempest, a collaboration between the Baxter Theatre Centre and the Royal Shakespeare Company, where he played Ariel alongside his father (Caliban) and Sir Antony Sher (Prospero). One reviewer described him as "the star of this production...he was a true pleasure to watch, embodying the character and interacting beautifully with the rest of the cast". Sean Hewitt of the Nottingham news site, Nottingham Post, wrote "....scene-stealing Atandwa Kani, the best Ariel I've ever seen".

In 2009, Kani made his United States television debut in the CW Television Network program Life Is Wild, an American adaptation of the hugely popular ITV family drama Wild at Heart that aired in the United Kingdom from 2006 until 2012. The American adaptation was commissioned for only one season, but from 2010 to 2012, Kani played the role of Thabo in series 5 and 6, plus a brief appearance in series 7, of the original British Wild at Heart, starring Stephen Tompkinson and Dawn Steele.

In 2009, Kani performed in two new plays, Hayani and ID Pending, which explore ideas of home and identity for young South Africans in different ways. Together with fellow actor and Wits graduate Nat Ramabulana, and directed by Warren Nebe, they premiered the productions at the Grahamstown National Arts Festival.

Kani has been featured in the TrueLove magazine in the first of its In Bed With... features. In 2010, he was a regular in the SABC TV series Soul Buddyz. In 2011, he became a regular on the SABC 2 political series, 90 Plein Street in its third season, directed by Khalo Matabane. He also served as Master of Ceremonies for the 46664 "Legacy" Bangle, alongside Tokyo Sexwale and Hlubi Mboya.

He then went on to play the young Nelson Mandela in the movie Mandela: Long Walk to Freedom, directed by Justin Chadwick, acting alongside Idris Elba, Naomie Harris and Terry Pheto.

Kani went on to appear as the lead on Kowethu, a SABC 1 drama directed by Rolie Nikiwe. After which he was seen in the international BET series The Book of Negroes alongside Cuba Gooding Jr.

In 2014, Kani joined the acclaimed group Fortune Cookie Theatre Company and, alongside Sylvaine Strike, went on to perform Black & Blue at the Market Theatre. He also performed Sizwe Banzi Is Dead in New York City, directed by Dr. John Kani. They are currently preparing for a South African tour of this production.

Kani has recently been seen in the hit Mzansi Magic TV series, It's Complicated.

On Tuesday, 12 July 2016, Kani attended the African premiere of The Suit, a short film in which he plays the role of Philemon, at the Old Fort of Zanzibar as part of the 19th Zanzibar International Film Festival. The film was written and directed by South African filmmaker Jarryd Coetsee and based on the short story by Can Themba. Though the film was not a part of the official competition, it was given a Special Mention by the jury.

In 2018, Kani portrayed the younger King T'Chaka, a dual part shared with his father, John Kani, in the film Black Panther.

== Personal life ==
He was married to presenter Thembisa Mdoda from 2012 – 2015 and married Fikile Mthwalo in 2015. Fikile and Atandwa separated in 2019 and divorced amicably in 2023 based on irreconcilable differences.

== Filmography ==
=== Film ===
Year	Title	Role	Notes
2013	Mandela: Long Walk to Freedom	Nelson Mandela (Aged 16–23)	
2016	The Suit	Philemon	Short film
2017	Love by Chance	Chance	Comedy
2018	Black Panther	Young King T'Chaka / Black Panther	
2020	Choices	Kenneth	Drama

=== Television ===
Year	Title	Role	Notes
2007–08	Life Is Wild	Tumelo	7 episodes
2010–12	Wild at Heart	Thabo	17 episodes
2011	Leonardo	Giovanni Salvatore	Episode: "Servant of Florence"
2014	Kowethu	Sibu	
2014	Generations	Samora Lembede	
2015	The Book of Negroes	New York jail guard	Miniseries; Episode 4
2016	Ashes to Ashes	Buzwe	Telenovela
2021-2023	What If...?	Young King T'Chaka / Black Panther	Voice; 2 episodes
