= Fikile Mthwalo =

South African actress

- Born: 13 April 1989 (age 37); Maseru, Lesotho
- Education: University of Cape Town (B.A.); New York University Tisch School of the Arts (M.F.A.)
- Occupations: Actor, script writer, TV presenter, entrepreneur
- Years active: 1998–present

Fikile Mthwalo (born 13 April 1989) is a Lesotho-born South African actress, script writer and entrepreneur. She is best known for her roles in the popular serials It's Complicated, Isidingo and Gold Diggers.

== Personal life ==
She was born on 13 April 1989 in Lesotho to a Mosotho father and Kenyan/Tanzanian mother. She has a younger brother who lives in Cape Town. From 2001 to 2005, she attended to Machabeng International College based in Maseru. Then she moved to Bloemfontein, South Africa and completed her Matric in 2007, at St Michael Girls School. In 2009, she joined the University of Cape Town and graduated with a Bachelor of Arts Film and Video Production.

She married fellow South African actor Atandwa Kani in December 2015. She met Kani during a television serial set where they got engaged and married a year after. They planned their traditional marriage lobolo after their wedding. Atandwa is the son of John Kani and Mandi Kani. Fikile and Atandwa separated in 2019 and divorced amicably in 2023 based on irreconcilable differences.

== Filmography ==
=== Film and television ===
Year	Title	Role	Notes
2014–2015	Isidingo	Zak	TV Series
2015	It's Complicated	Ipeleng	Lead Role
2015–2016	Gold Diggers	Hlengiwe Gumede	Series Regular
2017	The Good Fight	Itumeleng	1 Episode
2021	Tech Bae	Funke	TV Mini-series
2022	About Fate	Dana	Film
2026	South West High	TBD	Netflix Original
2026	Yoh! Bestie	Reabetswe “Rea” Mohlodi	Netflix Original

== Career ==
She started her acting career in the popular soap opera, Isidingo. She became one of the top 24 finalists in an 'O Access Presenter Search' aired on Channel O. In 2015, she made her first television lead role by playing the character of 'Ipeleng' in the serial It’s Complicated. Apart from that, she joined with several television commercials including Metropolitan, PEP, Omo, Shoprite, Etiselat Nigeria, Ponds, Hi-Malt Nigeria and Nivea UK. The she appeared in the telenovela Gold Diggers where she played the role 'Hlengiwe'. Fikile currently spends most of her time in New York and Los Angeles.

== Education ==
Fikile earned her bachelor's degree in film and video production from the University of Cape Town (UCT), where she graduated with honours in 2012. In 2015 she was awarded a full scholarship to attend New York University's Graduate Acting Program. In 2018 she graduated with a Master of Fine Arts in acting.
