= African Jim =

1949 South African drama film

- Directed by: Donald Swanson (film director)
- Produced by: Erica Rutherford
- Starring: Daniel Adnewmah, Dolly Rathebe, Dan Twala
- Distributed by: Africa Film Library/ M-Net
- Release date: 1949
- Running time: 50 minutes
- Country: South Africa
- Language: English

African Jim, also known as Jim Comes to Jo'burg, is a 1949 South African film, directed by Donald Swanson and produced by Erica Rutherford. It features Daniel Adnewmah, South African Jazz singer Dolly Rathebe, The African Inkspots, Sam Maile, Dan Twala, and The Jazz Maniacs that included South African Jazz saxophonist, composer and bandleader Bra Zacks Nkosi. It is notable as the South Africa' first African feature-length film. It was produced by Warrior Films.

== Plot synopsis ==
Jim (Daniel Adnewmah) leaves his tribal homeland to seek his fortune in the city of Johannesburg. As soon as he arrives, three gangsters mug him. When Jim regains consciousness, a friendly night watchman named Charlie (Dan Twala) takes care of him and helps him find a job. Unfortunately Jim gets fired, but with the help of the watchman's daughter, Julie (Dolly Rathebe), he gets a job in a nightclub as a waiter. When it is discovered that Jim has a talent for singing, he is offered the chance to sing on stage with Julie, as she is the club's female star. Just before his debut, he recognizes the gangsters who mugged him and overhears them plotting a robbery. Jim has to decide how to stop the crime and still be in time to perform.

== Cast ==
- Daniel Adnewmah as Jim
- Dolly Rathebe as Julie
- Dan Twala as Charlie
- Samuel Maile as Pianist in club
- Zacks Nkosi as Principal Alto Saxophonist in club
