= Erica Rutherford =

Canadian artist, filmmaker and writer

- Born: Eric Rutherford; 1 February 1923; Edinburgh, Scotland
- Died: 11 April 2008 (aged 85); Charlottetown, PEI, Canada
- Known for: painting, printmaking, writing
- Spouse(s): Chloe Clough (1942–1949); Gloria Green (1949–1955); Laura de Borgreve (1955–1966)
- Partner: Gail Turner (1959–2008)
- Awards: Father Adrien Arsenault Senior Arts Award (2001)

Erica Rutherford RCA (1 February 1923 in Edinburgh – 11 April 2008 in Charlottetown) was a British-Canadian artist, filmmaker and writer. She received the Father Adrien Arsenault Senior Arts Award (2001) and was elected to the Royal Canadian Academy of Arts (1999). She was the first Prince Edward Island artist to be featured at the Venice Biennale.

== Early life and education ==
Erica Rutherford was born Eric Rutherford on 1 February 1923 in Edinburgh, Scotland, to David and Isabel Rutherford. In 1928, the family moved to Portsmouth, England. Rutherford studied at St. John's College in Southsea, and entered the Dartmouth Royal Naval College in 1937, spending a year as a cadet on HMS Conway in Liverpool.

In 1939, Rutherford studied dramatic art at the Royal Academy in London. Rutherford became a professional actor, working for the next two years in London. During World War II, Rutherford toured England, performing at army camps.

In December 1942, Rutherford married Chloe Clough and the next year their daughter, Gail Erika, was born. The couple separated in 1944 and divorced in 1949.

In 1945, Rutherford took up studies, studying stage design, drawing and sculpture at London's Slade School of Fine Art and historic costume design at the Central School of Arts and Craft. This was followed by studies in drawing and painting at l'Académie Julien in Paris. During the same period, Rutherford worked as a stage and set designer, designing sets for more than thirty productions of various English theatres, including Theatre Royal in Windsor and Theatre Royal in York.

In April 1949, Rutherford married Gloria Green and they returned to London for a while. The next year, the couple moved to South Africa to work on the family farm. In the following years, they developed a banana plantation. Due to health issues, Gloria had to go to Switzerland in 1953, and not seeing each other again, the couple divorced in 1955. Later that year, Rutherford got married for the third time, to Laura de Borgreve, and the couple moved to London. After a brief marriage, they separated in 1958, officially divorcing in 1966.

== Career ==
In 1959, Rutherford met Australian-born artist Gail Turner and the couple moved to Ibiza, Spain. Rutherford concentrated on painting and exhibited widely throughout Europe. At this time, Rutherford's artwork started receiving significant recognition with a series of solo exhibits at London's Leicester Galleries. Briefly returning to England in 1964, Rutherford taught painting at the West Surrey College of Art in Farnham, but soon the couple went back to Spain, where in 1966, their daughter Susana was born.

The family returned to London in 1967, but being unable to find a job in local art schools, Rutherford decided to move to the United States. Rutherford started teaching at the Louisville School of Art in Kentucky in 1968, and by 1969 was a visiting professor at West Virginia University. In 1971, Rutherford became associate professor in the Art Department at the University of Missouri in Columbia, Missouri.

In 1975, Rutherford legally separated from Gail and then adopted the name Erica. She underwent gender affirming surgery during 1976 in St. Louis, Missouri.

After the surgery, Rutherford moved to Canada taking temporary teaching positions at the University of Guelph and Sheridan College in Ontario. In 1985, she settled in Prince Edward Island purchasing a property in Pinette. Eventually, her ex-wife Gail returned to live with her as a life partner and friend. In 1987, they opened an art studio and an artist's retreat at their Pinette property.

Rutherford started illustrating children's books such as The Owl and the Pussycat (1986). In following years, she also wrote and illustrated two humour books, Yoga for Cats (1987) and Dance for Cats (1988). In 1994, her children's book An Island Alphabet was published.

In 1993, Rutherford published her autobiography, Nine Lives: The Autobiography of Erica Rutherford, in which she discusses what she described as gender dysphoria. In the book, she also documented the details of her first visit to Prince Edward Island in 1970 that in 1985 became her permanent home.

Rutherford had a great influence on the Prince Edward Island art community. She acted as a formal and informal mentor for many in the community. In 1991, she held the first print-maker's workshop attracting the best artists in the country. Eventually it led to the formation of the Printmaker's Council of the P.E.I association.

In 1999, Rutherford was admitted to the Royal Canadian Academy of Arts. In 2001, she received Father Adrien Arsenault Senior Arts Award. Her last show Enigmatic Whispers, was held at the Confederation Centre Art Gallery in Charlottetown in 2006.

Erica Rutherford died on 11 April 2008 in Charlottetown, Prince Edward Island, at the age of 85.

A scholarship in her name is awarded by the University of Prince Edward Island. A current bursary in her name is offered by the Confederation Centre of the Arts.

== Exhibitions (selection) ==
- Leicester Galleries, London (1961–1964);
- Galeria Ivan Spence, Ibiza, Spain (1961–1966);
- Galerie San Jorge, Madrid, Spain (1962);
- Ashgate Gallery, Farnham, England (1966, 1970, 1974);
- Pollock Gallery (1975, 1981)
- Pascal Gallery, Toronto, Canada (1981, 1983);
- Gallery 1667, Halifax, Nova Scotia (1986);
- Confederation Centre Art Gallery, Charlottetown (2006)
- The Animal Within Creatures in (and outside) the Mumok Collection 2022–2023
- Women in Revolt, Tate Britain, 2023–2024
- Erica Rutherford: Her Lives and Works retrospective Confederation Centre Art Gallery 2024–2025;

== Collections ==
- Arts Council of Great Britain;
- Burnaby Art Gallery, British Columbia;
- Canada Council Art Bank, Ottawa;
- Corcoran Gallery of Art, Washington, D.C.;
- The government of Prince Edward Island Art Collection;
- Stephens College, Columbia, Missouri;
- University of Wales, Cardiff;
- Confederation Centre Art Gallery;
- Indianapolis Museum of Art;
- Museo de Arte Contemporáneo, Madrid, Spain.
- Owens Art Gallery, Mount Allison University

== Books ==
- The Owl and the Pussycat (1986)
- Yoga for Cats (1987)
- Dance for Cats (1988)
- Nine Lives: The Autobiography of Erica Rutherford (1993)
- An Island Alphabet (1994)

== Filmography ==
Jim Comes to Jo'Burg (1949, producer) Also known as African Jim.
