= Dolly Rathebe =

- Born: 2 April 1928; Randfontein, South Africa
- Died: 16 September 2004 (aged 76)
- Occupations: Singer, actress
- Years active: 1949-2003

Dolly Rathebe (OIS) (2 April 1928 – 16 September 2004) was a South African musician and actress who performed with the Elite Swingsters jazz band, and in Alf Herbert's African Jazz and Variety Show.

Rathebe died on 16 September 2004 from a stroke.

== Music career ==
Rathebe was born in Randfontein, South Africa but grew up in Sophiatown, which she describes as having been "a wonderful place". She was discovered around 1948 after singing at a picnic in Johannesburg. A talent scout from Gallo approached her and it was not long before she became a star.

Rathebe rose to fame in 1949, aged 21, when she appeared as a nightclub singer in the British-produced movie Jim Comes To Jo'burg - the first film to portray urban Africans in a positive light. During a photo-shoot for Drum magazine at a mine dump, Rathebe and the white photographer, Jürgen Schadeberg, were arrested under the Immorality Act, which forbade interracial relationships.

When Alf Herbert's African Jazz and Variety show opened in 1954, Rathebe appeared and stayed as Herbert's main attraction for many years. She became an international star when she sang with the Afro jazz group, the Elite Swingsters, in 1964.

After Sophiatown was flattened by the Apartheid government in the late 1950s and early 1960s, Rathebe found it more and more difficult to perform, especially after an 8 p.m. curfew was imposed. She moved with her family to Cape Town township and, to survive, ran a shebeen for many years.

In 1989, Rathebe re-united with the Elite Swingsters to perform in a film that was set in 1950s Johannesburg. The group stayed together, issuing a new album, Woza, in 1991. This was followed by two more albums, A Call for Peace (1995) and Siya Gida/We Dance (1997).

In 2001, Rathebe received the Lifetime Achievement Award at the South African Music Awards.

In 2003, at the age of 75, Rathebe appeared in a Johannesburg show Sof'Town, A Celebration!, where she sang "Randfontein", the story of an intoxicated miner returning home to find his wife in bed with another man, who is then beaten and chased out.

== Personal life ==
In 1958 Rathebe married Welcome Duru, a South African actor, boxing promoter, composer, musician, politician and a socialite, also known as Bra Wel. The couple had two children before their marriage was dissolved after four years.

== Community work ==
In her latter years Rathebe was a leading light in Pretoria's Ikageng Women's League. She funded the construction of a multi-purpose hall at Sofasonke village near Klipgat, north of Pretoria. The hall is named "Meriting kwaDolly", which means "Dolly's Retreat".

In 2004, Rathebe was awarded the South African Order of Ikhamanga in Silver for her "excellent contribution to music and the performing arts and commitment to the ideals of justice, freedom and democracy".
