= Ernest Cole (photographer) =

South African photographer (1940–1990)

- Born: Ernest Levi Tsoloane Cole; 21 March 1940; Eersterust, Pretoria, South Africa
- Died: 19 February 1990 (aged 49); New York City, U.S.
- Education: Wolsey Hall, Oxford, correspondence course
- Occupation: Photographer
- Known for: South Africa's first black freelance photographer
- Notable work: House of Bondage (1967)

Ernest Levi Tsoloane Cole (21 March 1940 – 19 February 1990) was a South African photographer. In the early 1960s, he started to freelance for clients such as Drum magazine, the Rand Daily Mail, and the Sunday Express. This made him South Africa's first black freelance photographer.

== Early life ==
Cole was a black South African, born in Eersterust in Pretoria, in 1940. His original family name was Kole and he later took the name Cole. He left school when the Bantu Education Act was put into place in 1953, and instead completed his diploma via a correspondence course with Wolsey Hall, Oxford. He started taking photographs at a very young age, eight years old, and in the 1950s, he was given a camera by a Roman Catholic priest, with which Cole broadened his portfolio. As he himself put it: "I quit school in 1957 rather than go along with the 'bantu' education for servitude which had become more strict than before."

== Career ==
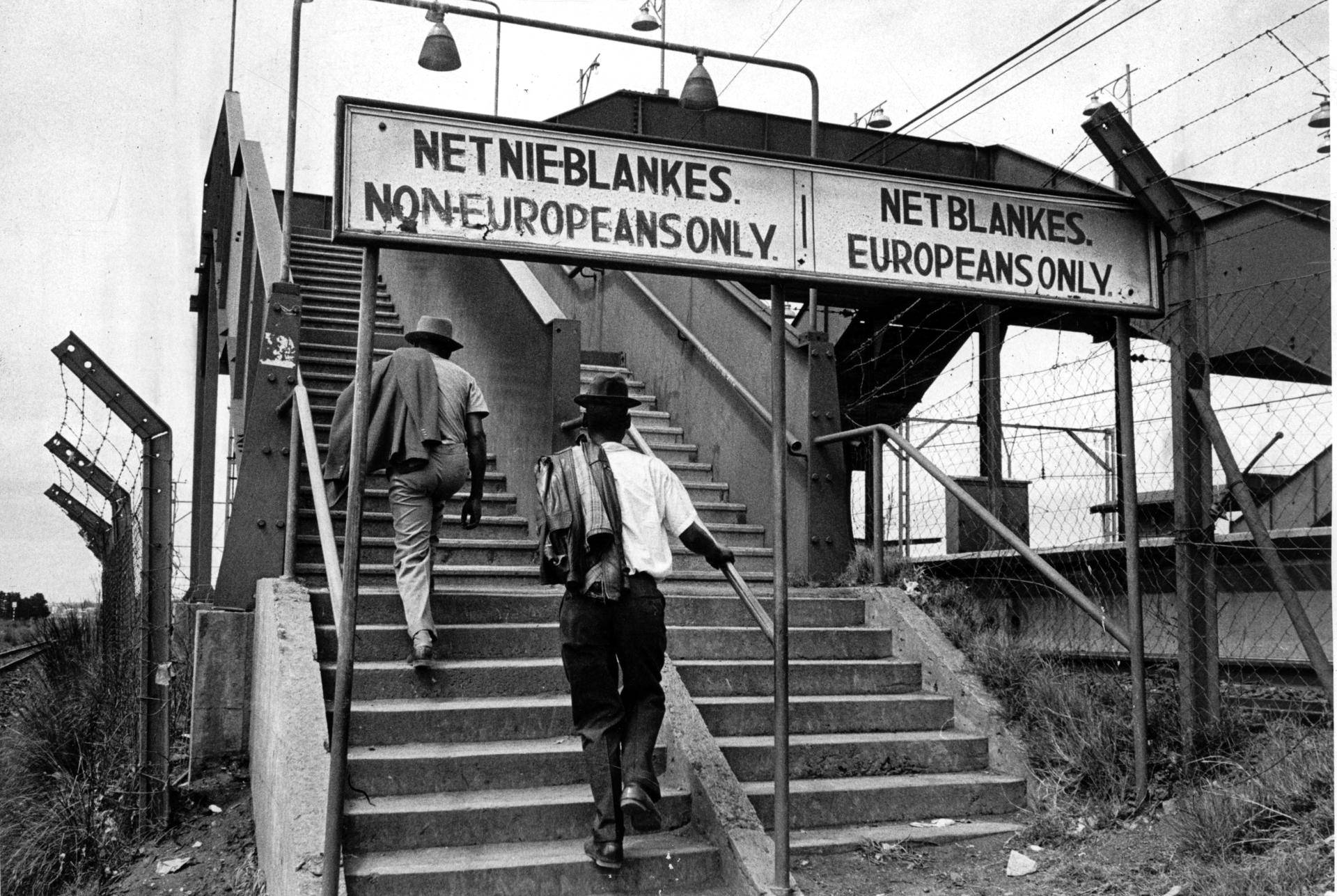
Photography of segregational signs at a South-African train station, by Ernest Cole.

In 1958, he applied for a job with Drum magazine. Jürgen Schadeberg, the picture editor, employed him as his assistant. Cole also started a correspondence course with the New York Institute of Photography.

While working for Drum, Cole began to mingle with other talented young black South Africans—journalists, photographers, jazz musicians, and political leaders in the burgeoning anti-apartheid movement—and became radicalised in his political views. He soon decided on a project that entailed recording the evils and daily social effects of apartheid.

He then worked at the Bantu World newspaper (later renamed The World – now The Sowetan), where he continued his career as a photographer.

Seeking to leave South Africa, he became re-classified as a "Coloured," not "Black" because he was able to fool the authorities. As a result, he was able to leave for New York City, United States, in 1966. He secretly took his apartheid project prints with him. He showed his work to Magnum Photos and this resulted in a publishing deal with publishing rights owned by Random House. The resulting book, House of Bondage (1967), was banned in South Africa.

In the book, Cole writes: "Three-hundred years of white supremacy in South Africa have placed us in bondage, stripped us of our dignity, robbed us of our self-esteem and surrounded us with hate."

Later, Cole received a grant from the Ford Foundation for another book, A study of the Negro family in the rural South and the Negro family in the urban ghetto. Although he took a large number of photographs, this project was never completed nor were additional books published. As of 2020, photographs from this series began to be scanned and published.

Cole subsequently moved to Sweden, where he took up filmmaking. The apartheid photos he had taken were extensively used by the ANC in their various publications.

== Death ==
Cole died of pancreatic cancer in New York City on 18 February 1990, at the age of 49.

== Photographic legacy ==
Cole's negatives were considered lost for a long time, but a collection of 60,000 negatives was found at a bank vault in Stockholm, Sweden, and, in April 2018, was given to his heirs, who had founded The Ernest Cole Family Trust. There are still 504 photographs held at the Hasselblad Foundation, with an estimated value of more than one million euros, and the ownership of these is in legal dispute. As of 2020, the legal dispute between Cole's estate and the Hasselblad Foundation is ongoing.

A cache of Cole's work having resurfaced in 2017, his book House of Bondage was reissued in 2022 by Aperture in New York, including a new preface by Mongane Wally Serote and "a selection of previously unseen photographs of creative expression and cultural activity in Black communities; a useful corrective to the uniform view of oppression and subjugation that had been its focus."

Cole's work was included in the 2025 exhibition Photography and the Black Arts Movement, 1955–1985 at the National Gallery of Art.

== Ernest Cole Award ==
The annual Ernest Cole Award was initiated in 2011 under the auspices of the University of Cape Town.

== Publications ==
- House of Bondage: A South African Black Man Exposes in His Own Pictures and Words the Bitter Life of His Homeland Today. New York: Random House, 1967. ISBN 0-394-42935-4. With an introduction by Joseph Lelyveld and a text by Thomas Flaherty.
- The truth about black people in South Africa. Hong Kong: Wide Angle Mirror Press, December 1977. Most probably a pirated publication.
- The Photographer. Göttingen, Germany: Steidl, 2010. Edited by Gunilla Knape. ISBN 978-3-86930-137-2. With essays by Struan Robertson and Ivor Powel.
- House of Bondage. New York, USA: Aperture, 2023. ISBN 978-1-59711-533-9.
- The True America. New York, USA: Aperture, 2024. ISBN 978-1-59711-534-6.

== Documentaries ==
- 2006: Ernest Cole – Directed by Jürgen Schadeberg, 52 minutes. "This is the story of the first black photojournalist to challenge South Africa's apartheid system. Risking imprisonment, Ernest Cole dedicated his life to showing the world the injustices and exploitation of segregation. But he paid a heavy price for his work and ended up dying in exile."
- 2024: Ernest Cole: Lost and Found – Directed by Raoul Peck, 105 minutes.

== Collections ==
Cole's work is held in the following public collections:

- The Art Institute of Chicago, Chicago, Illinois: 12 items
- Museum of Modern Art, New York, New York: 41 items
- Tate Modern, London: 19 items

== Exhibitions ==
- Photo-journalism exhibition at the Victoria and Albert Museum, London
- Life Under Apartheid at the Apartheid Museum, Johannesburg
- eye Africa (1960 to 1998) at the Castle's William Fehr Collection, Cape Town
- Colour this Whites Only at the Tate Museum in London
- 2001 – Soweto – A South African Myth – Photographs from the 1950s (by Alf Khumalo, Ernest Cole and Jürgen Schadeberg). The core of the exhibition was the student uprising of 1976. This includes some of Peter Magubane's work.
- 2010 – Ernest Cole: Photographer – Although not the first, this was the largest retrospective of his work displayed in Johannesburg at the Johannesburg Art Gallery. The exhibition was a homecoming of sorts for Cole's legacy, as many of his photographs previously had been banned in apartheid South Africa.
- 2012 – Everything Was Moving: Photography from the 60s and 70s – This exhibition at The Barbican Centre, London, contained a set of original prints by Ernest Cole long thought lost, but rediscovered in Sweden. The exhibition also contained a major body of work on South Africa by David Goldblatt.
- 2014 – Ernest Cole: Photographer – This exhibition was at the Grey Art Gallery of New York University in New York City. It featured more than 100 rare black-and-white gelatin silver prints from Cole's archive. This was the first major solo museum show of Cole's images. The exhibition was organised by the Hasselblad Foundation of Gothenburg, Sweden.
- 2023 – House of Bondage – Exhibition at foam gallery Amsterdam, The Netherlands, with pictures of a previously unpublished archive of work by Ernest Cole.
