= About Fate =

2022 film by Maryus Vaysberg

- Theatrical release poster
- Directed by: Maryus Vaysberg
- Screenplay by: Tiffany Paulsen
- Based on: The Irony of Fate by Emil Braginsky; Eldar Ryazanov
- Produced by: Marina Bespalov; Sergei Bespalov; Marius Vaysberg; Vincent Newman; Sergey Livnev
- Starring: Emma Roberts; Thomas Mann; Britt Robertson; Madelaine Petsch; Wendie Malick; Cheryl Hines; Lewis Tan
- Cinematography: David Hennings
- Edited by: David Dodson
- Music by: Benjamin Zecker
- Production companies: American International Pictures; Aldamisa Entertainment; Contentious Media
- Distributed by: United Artists Releasing
- Release date: September 9, 2022 (United States)
- Running time: 100 minutes
- Country: United States
- Language: English
- Box office: $504,843

About Fate is a 2022 American romantic comedy film directed by Maryus Vaysberg from a screenplay by Tiffany Paulsen. It is a remake of the 1976 Soviet television film The Irony of Fate. The film stars Emma Roberts, Thomas Mann, Britt Robertson, Madelaine Petsch, Wendie Malick, Cheryl Hines, and Lewis Tan.

The film was released in select theaters and on digital platforms in the United States on September 9, 2022, by United Artists Releasing.

== Plot ==
Margot Hayes, a realtor, and Griffin Reed, a lawyer, live in very similar homes, at very similar street addresses, in similarly named communities. On December 30, Margot hopes to be proposed to by her boyfriend Kip, so that she might go to her sister's wedding engaged. However, when it does not happen, she walks out.

Meanwhile, in the same restaurant, Griffin tries to propose to his girlfriend, Instagram influencer Clementine. However, she insists he do it again for her publicly the next night. He then gets day drunk with his buddies, and when they order a taxi for him, they give the driver the wrong address—Margot's, as hers is very similar to his.

Griffin, opening the door with the key left under Margot's flower pot, notices that the cat looks different and the apartment looks strange. However, he is too drunk to care, and falls asleep. Margot comes home to find a naked stranger in her bed.

Kip visits her apartment to pick up his tux and sees Griffin putting on his clothes and gets upset, threatening Griffin and leaves. Margot, needing someone to accompany her to her sister's wedding, convinces Griffin to join her, as no one in her family has seen Kip or knows what he looks like.

The pair goes to the wedding together. Along the way, they meet an older married couple and make friends with them. The woman gives Margot her pink coat, telling her that thanks to the coat, her husband was able to find her after nearly losing her.

After several complications, Margot and Griffin arrive at the wedding where Griffin (claiming to be Kip) becomes an unexpected hit. Unfortunately for Margot, the real Kip shows up, and the whole charade is ruined. Margot and Griffin seem to go back to their respective partners, but realize that they truly care for each other. Margot comes to Griffin's home with the bag that he left at her place. She shows him an old tattoo of a griffin on her shoulder and they fall on his bed together, kissing. A crying Clementine shows up, prompting Margot to leave.

The next day, Griffin meets his parents at the same café where he and Margot had met, and they comfort him, saying he has yet to find his true love. Suddenly, he sees the pink coat, and with it, Margot. They share a kiss.

== Cast ==
- Emma Roberts as Margot Hayes, based on the character Nadya Shevelyova from The Irony of Fate
- Thomas Mann as Griffin Reed, based on the character Zhenya Lukashin from The Irony of Fate
- Madelaine Petsch as Clementine Pratt, Griffin's girlfriend and an Instagram influencer, based on the character Galya from The Irony of Fate
- Lewis Tan as Kip Prescott, Margot's boyfriend, based on the character Ippolit from The Irony of Fate
- Britt Robertson as Carrie Hayes, Margot's sister
- Fikile Mthwalo as Dana, Margot's co-worker and friend
- Jared Troilo as Brian, Carrie's fiancé
- Cheryl Hines as Judy Hayes, Margot and Carrie's mother
- Dennis Staroselsky as Sam, Griffin's co-worker and friend
- Meeghan Holaway as Flour
- Ken Cheeseman as Paul Hayes, Margot and Carrie's father
- Ricardo Pitts-Wiley as Charlie
- Rose Weaver as Hazel
- Wendie Malick as Nancy Reed, Griffin's mother

== Production ==
Vaysberg had been planning a remake of Irony of Fate as early as 2006. Lynda Obst Productions, Adam Sandler's Happy Madison Productions and Paramount had all considered picking up the film, but plans were only finalized just before the COVID-19 pandemic when Vaysberg and Paulsen teamed up to create a script for the film.

Initially, Vaysberg considered Mila Kunis for the lead female role, believing that Kunis was uniquely suited to the role due to her Soviet roots. While Kunis was pleased with the project, she rejected the role, saying that the project was too "fluffy".

On April 8, 2021, it was announced that Emma Roberts would star in a film written by Tiffany Paulsen. On April 13, Central Partnership announced a remake of The Irony of Fate starring Roberts and Thomas Mann.

In an interview with Kommersant, Vaysberg said the film would be in the style of The Proposal (2009), and expressed confidence that it would translate well to American audiences. Many artists and famous personalities in Russia reacted negatively to the news, including Liya Akhedzhakova and Valentina Talyzina, two of the few remaining living actors from the original film, and the daughter of Eldar Ryazanov, the director of the original The Irony of Fate.

In May 2021, Lewis Tan and Anna Akana were announced as joining the cast. The following month, Madelaine Petsch joined the cast.

Principal photography began in Boston in June 2021, with some exterior location shots on the town common in Norwood, Massachusetts.

== Reception ==
On the review aggregator website Rotten Tomatoes, the film holds an approval rating of 63% based on reviews from 8 critics.

Lisa Kennedy of The New York Times wrote, "A few coincidences can have their charms" but the film "creaks under the weight of a pile of improbabilities".
