= The Suit (2016 film) =

- Directed by: Jarryd Coetsee
- Written by: Jarryd Coetsee
- Produced by: Luke Sharland
- Starring: Atandwa Kani, Phuthi Nakene, John Kani
- Release date: June 16, 2016 (Durban International Film Festival)
- Running time: 30 minutes
- Country: South Africa
- Languages: English, some Zulu and Tsotsitaal

The Suit is a short drama film from South Africa written and directed by Jarryd Coetsee, and produced by Luke Sharland, based on the short story by Can Themba. The film stars Tony Award-winner John Kani as Mr. Maphikela, and his son, Atandwa Kani as Philemon. Phuthi Nakene plays Matilda.

== Plot ==
In 1950s Sophiatown, South Africa, a man forces his wife to treat her lover's suit as if it were a person, with tragic consequences.

The film opens with a prologue in which Spokes Mashiyane's "Come Back" plays from an old radio in a bedroom. In a montage of shots, a person dresses: a hand removes a suit from a cupboard, the same hand polishes shoes, brushes trousers, fastens cufflinks, buttons up a jacket and finally adjusts a tie.

Philemon, a middle-class lawyer awakens his sleeping wife Matilda, whom he calls Tilly, in their bedroom, with breakfast in bed. He is dressed in a suit and carries a fedora. The married couple lives in Sophiatown, a township of Johannesburg, in the early 1950s, shortly before the apartheid regime forcibly removed non-whites from the area to make way for white resettlement under the Group Areas Act and the Natives Resettlement Act, 1954. She kisses him and adjusts his tie as he tells her that he better go or he will be late for work. She kisses him again for longer, then he leaves the house. Matilda climbs out of bed and walks to the bedroom window, watching Philemon walk away, then she turns back and gazes at the empty, lonely house.

Philemon walks down a busy street as a caption appears on screen saying: Sophiatown, Johannesburg, 1955. At a bus-stop, under a sign that reads: Native Bus Stop, Philemon meets his old friend Mr. Maphikela who appears to be anxious because he drops his briefcase as Philemon attempts to shake his hand. Their bus arrives and the two men board. On the bus, Mr. Maphikela reluctantly informs Philemon that Matilda has been visited by a young man every morning for the last three months. Devastated, Philemon tells Maphikela that he has to go, and he hurries off the bus as Maphikela tells him to keep steady. As Philemon alights from the bus, another passenger boards the bus. The white bus conductor yells at the passenger in colloquial Afrikaans: "Nie-blankes, upstairs!", which means: "Non-whites, upstairs!" because public amenities, like buses, were segregated under apartheid. As the bus pulls off, Maphikela watches Philemon marching past other pedestrians.

In a montage of shots, Matilda pours two glasses of whiskey, flirts and dances with a shirtless young man as Spokes Mashiyane's "Zoo Lake Jive" plays from a gramophone. In the same montage, Philemon marches through the streets of Sophiatown, loosening his tie aggressively and bumping into other pedestrians. The montage ends as Matilda kisses the young man and Philemon reaches the front door of his house. He opens the door, shuts it behind him, puts his briefcase down on the floor, then inhales deeply, gathering himself. Philemon walks deliberately to the bedroom where he discovers Matilda asleep in the arms of her lover.

Philemon's face fills with rage. He notices the lover's suit hanging on the cupboard door. Philemon controls his anger and ambles to the cupboard, searching through it. He pretends as if he has not noticed the lovers in bed, and tells Matilda that he was nearly at work when he realised that he had left his pass at home so he returned to fetch it. While saying so, Philemon drapes the lover's suit over his arm. Matilda and her lover wake with a start. The lover rushes to the window, completely naked, then leaps out of it, fleeing down the street. Philemon treads purposefully to the window, watching the man running away, then locks it. Philemon tells Matilda that he must phone his boss to let him know that he will not come in to work today as his wife is unwell. While Philemon phones his boss, Matilda dresses quickly in her nightgown and waits anxiously on the bed.

Philemon returns and regards the suit. He tells Matilda that he notices that they have a visitor. Philemon commands Matilda to treat the suit with the same hospitality that she would show to a guest: it will share meals with them, it will share their bedroom, it will go for walks with them, etc. If she refuses, he says that he will kill her.

For the first time in his life, Philemon goes to a shebeen (an illegal speakeasy). While Spokes Mashiyane's "Kwela Zulu" plays, the shebeen queen removes alcohol (the sale of which was prohibited to blacks) from below a trap-door in a side-room then brings a bottle to Philemon as he smokes. Philemon stays at the shebeen all day, leaving Matilda alone with her thoughts and fears. When Philemon returns, he finds that Matilda has cleaned and spruced up their dingy home. She even wears a beautiful new dress and has prepared dinner. Unmoved, Philemon scolds his wife: where is their visitor? Matilda retrieves the suit and prepares a plate of food for it. Philemon instructs her how she should place the suit at the table so that it becomes indeed the third person. Matilda is petrified and scurries about as he barks orders. While Philemon eats, Matilda edges towards the window and opens it to get some air. But Philemon walks up and locks it from behind her then orders her to return to the table while he finishes his meal. This is how it should be from now on, Philemon tells her. They wash their plates and cutlery at the kitchen sink in silence, the suit hanging on the wall beside Matilda. Later, in the sitting room, Matilda irons the suit as Philemon smokes ominously behind her.

On a Sunday, Philemon and Matilda walk to church. Matilda is deeply humiliated as she has to carry the suit slung over her shoulder. On the way, the couple walks past a wall on which a slogan has been painted: Ons Dak Nie, Ons Phola Hier, which is Tsotsitaal for We Won't Leave, We Are Staying Here. Philemon and Matilda enter the Anglican Church of Christ the King in Ray Street (which is incidentally the same street in which the writer Can Themba lived at Number 111). Above the altar is a conspicuous statue of a black Jesus. Philemon and Matilda are seated at a pew with the suit over the seat between them. Matilda's church friend arrives late with her husband and asks Matilda if they can sit beside her. Matilda looks to Philemon for permission but he glares at her. Matilda tells her church friend that someone else is seated there so her church friend tells her not to worry, that they will find seats elsewhere. After the service, Matilda's best friend Sane asks Matilda whether she will join her at choir practice from which she has been absent for a while. Matilda again looks to Philemon for permission, and he says that he does not see why she should not go. Sane's husband Vuzi asks Philemon whether the suit that is slung over Matilda's shoulder is a new suit and compliments him by saying it looks stylish. Philemon scowls at Matilda as they leave the church.

Back home, Philemon reads in the sitting room. When Matilda attempts to sit beside him, he tells her to go put the fellow to rest, referring to the suit which she is carrying. Later, Philemon finds Matilda lying on the bed sobbing as she caresses the suit. He tosses some money at her and tells her to prepare a dinner for her friends because she should not mope around all day. But he reminds her to take the suit with her, which he sarcastically refers to as their visitor.

Matilda sings "Amazing Grace" with a choir of wives at the cultural club of the Anglican Mission. The suit hangs conspicuously on a hat stand beside them. The song continues over a montage of shots. Matilda goes to buy provisions for her dinner party. On her way home, carrying the suit, she walks past a political rally where the speaker calls the crowd to resist the forced removals by insisting that they will not move. The speaker shouts the popular Zulu and Xhosa rallying cry: Amandla! (The power!) and the crowd replies with the traditional: “Ngawethu!" (Is ours!).

As a turkey cooks in the oven, Matilda dances with the suit to Spokes Mashiyane's "Zoo Lake Jive". Knocks sound from the front door. Philemon yells from the sitting room that Matilda must get the door, but she does not hear him above the music. Philemon continues to yell, but Matilda still does not hear him. Finally, Philemon storms into the room and Matilda bumps into him with a fright as the music stops suddenly. Matilda rushes to the front door and opens to see Sane, Vuzi and two other friends.

Matilda serves her friends turkey at the dinner table. Philemon demands that she fetches their guest of honour. Matilda begs him to let it go just this once, but he raises his voice. Deeply humiliated, Matilda serves the suit a meal in front of her friends. Eventually, Vuzi asks what is going on. Philemon tells Vuzi to ask Matilda, as she "knows the fellow best". Matilda brushes it off by saying that it is just a silly game that she and her husband play at meal-times. The guests chuckle, but as Matilda continues to serve the suit a meal, the dinner continues with the proverbial awkward silence as Matilda's friends watch her with bewildered amusement. After the uncomfortable dinner, the friends decide to go to a local shebeen to dance. Matilda is about to follow them out of the house when Philemon steps in front of her and commands her to put the suit to bed. Philemon leaves with the friends, leaving Matilda standing alone in the doorway. As she presses the suit to her breast, we see her from behind in the empty entrance-way.

While Philemon dances with the friends at the smoky shebeen to the tune of Spokes Mashiyane's "Phatha Phatha", we return to the prologue in which a person dresses: a hand removes a suit from a cupboard, the same hand polishes shoes, brushes trousers, fastens cufflinks, buttons up a jacket. Finally, we realise that the person now fully dressed in the suit is in fact Matilda, though we do not see her face, and the tie is attached to the rafters of the bedroom. Back at the shebeen, Philemon is seated, contemplating his punishment of Matilda, as the music and sounds fade to a muffle. Gradually, Billie Holiday's "Strange Fruit" fades in as Philemon scratches his brow and the song continues to play as Philemon staggers home in the early hours of the morning. "Strange Fruit" was popular in Sophiatown at the time due to the gradual entrenchment of apartheid laws. Matilda steps up onto a crate, then kicks it out from underneath her and she hangs herself. Philemon enters the bedroom and falls to his knees below Matilda's hanging feet as he shouts her name repeatedly. "Strange Fruit" continues to play over the end credits of the film.

== Cast ==
- Atandwa Kani as Philemon
- Phuthi Nakene as Matilda
- John Kani as Mr. Maphikela
- Sabelo Ndumo as Vusi
- Tiny Faltsi as Tsephiso
- Kopano Ezekiel as Ndlela
- Thabo Ndimande as Priest
- Phumzile Chili as Church Woman
- Tebogo Keilwang as Husband
- Martha Shumba as Political Speaker

== Production ==
“The Suit" was filmed on location in Sophiatown, Johannesburg. The film was shot in some of the few buildings that survived the apartheid regime's forced removals of non-whites from the area to make way for white resettlement. Philemon and Matilda's house and the shebeen scenes were shot at the St. Joseph's Diocesan Centre. The church scenes were filmed at the Anglican Church of Christ the King in Ray Street. The writer Can Themba actually lived in a bachelor's flat in Ray Street, at Number 111, near the church. The exterior street scenes were shot at the Eeufeesoord Retirement Village. The bus scenes were shot on a period double-decker bus that actually drove the Sophiatown route in the 1950s, supplied by the James Hall Museum of Transport. Costumes were designed by award-winning South African costume designer Pierre Vienings who was also the costume designer on the Oscar-winning film "Tsotsi". Several costumes, including the eponymous suit, are original 1950s pieces.

== Release ==
“The Suit” held its official premiere at the Old Fort of Zanzibar as part of the 19th Zanzibar International Film Festival on Tuesday, 12 July 2016. Though it was not part of the official selection due to the film being completed after the deadline, the film was given a Special Mention by the jury. "The Suit" won the Best Short Film Award at the 11th South African Film and Television Awards (or SAFTAs, South Africa's Oscars) on 18 March 2017 in Sun City. "The Suit" was selected in competition at three Oscar-qualifying film festivals: the BronzeLens Film Festival of Atlanta where it won the Best International Short as well as the Best of the Festival Awards on Saturday 26 August 2017, the Urbanworld Film Festival in New York City and the Pan-African Film Festival in Los Angeles where it received a Special Mention. It won the Best Short Film competition of the Scotland African Film Festival (AiM) in Glasgow and Edinburgh, as well as the Audience Award of the Cape Town leg of the Switzerland-based Shnit International Short Film Festival on 9 October 2016. The film opened the 9th Île Courts – International Short Film Festival of Mauritius on 10 October 2016.

The film was also selected by the Académie des Arts et Techniques du Cinéma (France's national academy of cinema which gives France's highest honour for film, the César Award) for its prestigious "Les Nuits en Or" (Golden Nights) event which saw the film screened in nine European capitals (Paris, Rome, Athens, Madrid, Stockholm, Lisbon, Vienna, Brussels and Luxembourg), 24 cities and towns across France and a gala evening hosted by UNESCO in Paris and attended by France's leading actors and film-makers. The film was also shown at the Schomburg Center for Research in Black Culture's "Best Of" film series and the New Voices in Black Cinema Film Festival both in New York City, the Toronto Black Film Festival, the Vancouver-South African Film Festival, the Red Bull Amaphiko Film Festival (in Soweto), and the Durban International Film Festival. The film screened in nineteen different cities in Belgium as part of the Afrika Film Festival – Leuven (Leuven African Film Festival), the iAfrica Film Festival in Leiden and The Hague and the Africa on Screen Film Festival in Melbourne as well. "The Suit" also screened at the South African National Arts Festival in Grahamstown, an important event on the South African cultural calendar, and the biggest annual celebration of the arts on the African continent. The film was shown to audiences in Maryland, Washington D.C. and Virginia as part of the Baltimore International Black Film Festival, The film screened at the Jozi Film Festival in Johannesburg, the BRICS Film Festival at the BRICS Conference in Brussels and the Cape Town International Film Festival all in September 2017. In November 2017, "The Suit" screened at the oldest film festival in Africa, the Carthage Film Festival, in Tunisia. In May 2018, "The Suit" screened at the Film Society of Lincoln Center's New York African Film Festival in New York City.

== See also ==
- The Suit, a short story by Can Themba.
