= Barney Simon =

South African editor, playwright and director (1932–1995)

- Born: 13 April 1932; Johannesburg, South Africa
- Died: 30 June 1995 (aged 63); Johannesburg, South Africa
- Occupations: Editor, playwright, director
- Writing career
- Language: English
- Notable work: Woza Albert! (1981)

Barney Simon (13 April 1932 – 30 June 1995) was a South African writer, playwright and director. He was born in Johannesburg, South Africa, and spent most of his life there. The city of Johannesburg and its denizens, shaped by diverse racial and gender identities as well as by South Africa's politics, provided the core inspiration for his writing and directing work.

== Early life and apprenticeship ==
Born on 13 April 1932 in Johannesburg, South Africa, the son of working-class Lithuanian Jewish immigrants, Simon discovered a love of theatre while working backstage for South African Jewish impresario Taubie Kushlick (1910–1991) in Johannesburg when he was still in high school. He was particularly influenced during his stay from 1953 to 1955 by the methods of Joan Littlewood in the East End of London in the 1950s, whose company Theatre Workshop, co-founded by Howard Goorney, drew not only on source texts but also on company members' experience to create socially relevant theatre. Returning to Johannesburg, he supported himself as an advertising copywriter while producing and directing plays, including Athol Fugard's The Blood Knot (1961). Simon also published short stories in anti-apartheid magazines such as The Classic, edited by Nat Nakasa and later by Simon himself from 1964 to 1971. Simon spent a year (1969–70) in New York City, where he introduced South African plays to American audiences and observed African-American performances by members of the Black Arts movement, and edited the literary journal New American Review.

== Building the company ==
Back in South Africa in the early 1970s, Simon applied his dual interests in theatre and social activism to work in rural health education, creating scenarios for role-play to help black nurses better understand their patients. in Johannesburg, he staged multi-racial plays anywhere he could, in warehouses and shantytowns, storefronts and back yards, but in 1974, Simon and his collaborator Mannie Manim, who was working for the government-sponsored Performing Arts Council of the Transvaal (PACT), founded The Company and gained access to PACT's experimental Arena Stage, housed in an old school building, where they put on South African adaptations of classical plays, such as Georg Büchner's Woyzeck and Sophocles' Antigone.

== Barney Simon and the Market Theatre ==
In 1976, Simon and Manim co-founded Market Theatre, Johannesburg's first multiracial cultural centre, drawing in part on the model of The Space, the first racially integrated theatre to emerge in the post-war apartheid period, and in part from Simon's experience collaborating with black artists in local adaptations of European classics, such as Phiri (1972). Backed in large part by liberal capitalists, often Jewish, who funded the renovation of the historic building, which had housed the Indian Fruit Market since the 1890s, Simon and Manim were able to defy apartheid law that mandated separate venues for black and white, and to provide a relatively safe space for black theatre artists who were more likely to face the threat of arrest for staging anti-apartheid plays.

Simon remained the theatre's artistic director from its opening until he died in 1995. While he directed South African adaptations of European experimental and often socially critical drama, from Peter Weiss's Marat-Sade, which opened the main house in 1976, to many adaptations of Bertolt Brecht, Simon is best known for collectively workshopped plays for integrated casts, drawing on the contrasting life experiences of black and white members of the company. These included controversial dramatizations in response to violent state repression of politics, such as Black Dog (1984), about the Soweto Uprisings of 1976, and Born in the RSA (1985), about the crackdown during the State of Emergency in 1985, but also more subtle treatments of social conflict, such as the exploration of the struggles of South African women in the play Call Me Woman (1979), which the cast developed after the Market was unable to secure production rights for Ntozake Shange's play For Colored Girls Who Have Considered suicide.

Simon's last production, The Suit (Market Theatre, 1993), was adapted from a short story of the same name by Can Themba, but fleshed out the characters by drawing on English and South African vernacular dialogue developed by the original cast. Simon collaborated with the Paris-based Peter Brook and his colleague screenwriter Jean-Claude Carrière on the French translation, staged at the Bouffes du Nord in 1994.

== Literary life and publications ==
Simon was active in South African literature as the editor from 1964 to 1971 of The Classic, the influential anti-apartheid South African journal of literature founded by Nat Nakasa in 1963. Simon edited an autobiographical novel by Dugmore Boetie, Familiarity is the Kingdom of the Lost (London: Barrie & Jenkins, 1969), for which Simon also wrote an afterword. A collection of Simon's own stories, Joburg Sis!, was published in 1974. Adapted for the stage, these stories or, more accurately, monologues written with particular actors in mind, were staged first by the Company at the Arena Stage in 1974 and later revived at the Market Theatre. The original performance of the title story "Joburg, Sis!" is noteworthy for actor Marius Weyers' sympathetic portrayal of a gay man in Hillbrow, at the time a cosmopolitan apartment district in central Johannesburg, which provided relative safety at a time when homosexual conduct was criminalized in South Africa. A decade later, Outers (1985) and Score Me the Ages, published in Born in the RSA and Other Plays, also featured LGBTQ+ characters.

Simon collaborated with Percy Mtwa and Mbongeni Ngema on the 1981 satirical play Woza Albert!, a two-man show that uses a hypothetical visit of Jesus Christ to satirize the absurd side of apartheid life. First performed at the Market Theatre, Woza Albert was published by Methuen in London in 1983 and has been continuously in print and on South African stages and school syllabi since then.

Although not primarily concerned with film, Simon directed an adaptation of Woza Albert at London's Riverside Studios in 1983 and, for the BBC, a film version of the story "City Lovers" by Nadine Gordimer, who shared with Simon a lifelong fascination with their home town Johannesburg.

== Death ==
Simon died in Johannesburg, aged 63, on 30 June 1995, having suffered a heart attack a week earlier, while hospitalized for an apparently minor complaint.

== Publications ==
=== Selected plays ===
- Phiri (1972)
- Hey Listen (1973)
- People (1973)
- People Too (1974)
- Storytime (1975)
- Cincinnati (1977)
- Cold Stone Jug (1980)
- Call Me Woman (1979)
- Marico Moonshine and Manpower (1981)
- Woza Albert! (1981)
- Black Dog-Inj'emnyama ( 1984)
- Born in the RSA (1985)
- Outers (1985)
- Klaaglied vir Kous (1986)
- Inyanga - about Women in Africa (1989)
- Eden and Other Places (1989)
- Score Me the Ages (1989)
- Starbrites (1990)
- Singing The Times (1992)
- Silent Movie (1993)
- The Lion and the Lamb (1993)
- The Suit (1993)

== Sources ==
- A Singing in Every Moment and Inch of Me: The Letters of Barney Simon to Lionel Abraham (2009), Seven Stories Press. ISBN 978-1-58322-832-6
- The World In An Orange: Making Theatre with Barney Simon (2006), edited by Leila Henriques and Irene Stephanou, Seven Stories Press. ISBN 978-1-58322-711-4
- Woza Afrika! - An Anthology of South African Plays (1986), George Braziller. ISBN 978-0-8076-1170-8
- Born in the RSA and Other Workshopped Plays (1997) by Barney Simon and the casts. Ed. Pat Schwartz. Wits University Press. ISBN 1-86814-300-7
- Best of Company: The Story of Johannesburg's Market Theatre (1988) by Pat Schwartz. AD Donker. ISBN 9780868521640.
- Joburg, Sis! (1974), Bateleur. ISBN 0-620-01405-9
