= Woza Albert! =

1981 South African political play

- Written by: Percy Mtwa; Mbongeni Ngema; Barney Simon
- Genre: Political satire, Workshop
- Setting: South Africa

Premiere
- Date: 1981
- Place: Market Theatre, Johannesburg

Woza Albert! ("Come Albert!") is a satirical South African political play written by Percy Mtwa, Mbongeni Ngema, and Barney Simon in 1981 and first performed at the Market Theatre in Johannesburg. The play is a two-man show that contains 26 vignettes.

The play imagines the second coming of Jesus Christ during the apartheid-era as experienced by a variety of black South Africans. Written as a piece of protest theatre, Woza Albert! sought to confront the inequalities and oppression of apartheid in South Africa. Woza Albert! was turned into a film and is a prime example of Workshop Theatre movement in South Africa and became one of the most produced South African plays within South Africa and internationally. The play is highly praised for its use of humour and ability to illuminate and critique the systematic oppression of black South Africans under the apartheid regime.

== Plot ==
The two actors play roles of various black South Africans – a vendor, barber, servant, manual labourer, soldier – receiving the news that Christ (Morena) has arrived in South Africa, where a Calvinist white elite imposes apartheid. Christ's arrival precipitates a crisis, and the government launches a nuclear bomb against the peacemaker. In the ruins, great South African leaders in resistance to apartheid such as Albert Luthuli, former president of the African National Congress, are resurrected. They play dozens of parts that involve them using many skills such as acting, mime, singing and dance. They also create images using a few words and actions

== Composition ==
The idea for the work came from Percy Mtwa and Mbogeni Ngema in 1979 when they were both on tour, as lead performers, in a major Gibson Kente production, Mama and the Load. The actors became intrigued by the idea of what would happen if there was a 'second coming' and Jesus Christ appeared in South Africa. In order to develop their idea, both actors abandoned the security of work with Kente and spent a year researching and developing their play in conditions of considerable hardship. At this point a number of directors were invited to see the work-in-progress and Barney Simon of the Market Theatre agreed to work on developing the piece to the point of performance.

== Performance history ==
Woza Albert! is an example of Workshop Theater which was a common form of performance in South Africa at the time as it allowed people to come together to create a performance that they were passionate about, as it featured black playwrights and a white producer. This was also important as other forms of expression and criticism were banned at the time.

The play opened at Johannesburg's Market Theater and toured in Europe and America. The Market Theater, pioneered by Barney Simon, allowed multiracial casts and audiences and was often threatened by the government. It was the most successful play to come out of South Africa, winning more than 20 awards worldwide.

In 2002, it was performed in London by Siyabonga Twala and Errol Ndotho. In 2003 it was produced by Terence Frisby at the Criterion Theatre in London.

In 2019 the play was revived with Ngema and Mtwa playing their original roles with the direction of Christopher John at the Baxter Theater in South Africa.

== Film ==
A film was made under the same title, following the success of the play. A team from BBC Television, led by David M. Thompson, undertook the filming of the movie while in South Africa to film elections in 1981. Equipment was scant, as was time, but nonetheless the film captured the performances that are the core of the film.
