= DRUM (South African magazine) =

South African magazine

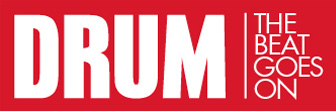
- Categories: Family magazine
- Frequency: Weekly
- Founded: 1951
- Final issue: 16 July 2020 (print)
- Company: Media24
- Country: South Africa
- Based in: Johannesburg
- Language: English
- Website: drum.co.za

DRUM is a South African online family magazine mainly aimed at black readers, containing market news, entertainment and feature articles. It has two sister magazines: Huisgenoot (aimed at White and Coloured Afrikaans-speaking readers) and YOU (aimed at demographically diverse South African English-speaking readers).

In 2005 Drum was described as "the first black lifestyle magazine in Africa", but it is noted chiefly for its early 1950s and 1960s reportage of township life under apartheid. From July 2020 the magazine became an online magazine.

== History ==
Drum was started in 1951 as African Drum by former test cricketer and author Bob Crisp and Jim Bailey, an ex-RAF. pilot, son of South African financier Sir Abe Bailey and the aviator Mary Bailey.

Initially under Crisp's editorship, the magazine had a paternalistic, tribal representation of Africans, but within a short time Crisp was replaced and the emphasis moved to the vibrant urban black townships.

The paper in its early years had a series of outstanding editors:

- Anthony Sampson, 1951–55
- Sylvester Stein, 1955–58
- Sir Tom Hopkinson, 1958–1962

Both Sampson and Stein wrote books about their times as editor, Drum: A Venture into the New Africa (1956, republished in 2005 as Drum: the making of a magazine) and Who Killed Mr Drum? (1999) respectively. Hopkinson, for his part, wrote about his experiences at the paper in his memoir, Under the Tropic.

Drum's heyday in the 1950s fell between the Defiance Campaign and the tragedy at Sharpeville. This was the decade of potential Black emergence, the decade when the Freedom Charter was written and the decade when the ANC alliance launched the Defiance Campaign. The aim was to promote an equal society. The Nationalist government responded with apartheid crackdowns and treason trials.

It was also the decade of the movement to the cities, of Sophiatown, of Black Jazz, the jazz opera King Kong with a Black cast, an adoption of American culture, of shebeens (illegal drinking dens) and flamboyant American style gangsters (tsotsis) with chrome-laden American cars who spoke a slang called Tsotsitaal.

It was a time of optimism and hope. DRUM was a "record of naivety, optimism, frustration, defiance, courage, dancing, drink, jazz, gangsters, exile and death".

DRUM described the world of the urban Black; the culture, the colour, dreams, ambitions, hopes and struggles. Lewis Nkosi described DRUM's young writers as "the new African[s] cut adrift from the tribal reserve – urbanised, eager, fast-talking and brash."

Peter Magubane described the atmosphere in the newsroom. "DRUM was a different home; it did not have apartheid. There was no discrimination in the offices of DRUM magazine. It was only when you left DRUM and entered the world outside of the main door that you knew you were in apartheid land. But while you were inside DRUM magazine, everyone there was a family."

DRUM′s cast of black journalists included Henry ("Mr DRUM") Nxumalo, Can Themba, Todd Matshikiza, Nat Nakasa, Lewis Nkosi and others such as William "Bloke" Modisane, Arthur Maimane, Stan Motjuwadi and Casey Motsisi. Together, they were known as "the DRUM Boys". This group lived by the dictum "live fast, die young and have a good-looking corpse". Most of these journalists went on to publish works in their own right. The other journalists who worked there include Bessie Head, Lionel Ngakane, Richard Rive and Jenny Joseph.

It was not only the writers–the pictures were also important. The main photographer and artistic director was Jürgen Schadeberg, who arrived in South Africa in 1950 after leaving a war-ravaged Berlin. He became one of the rare European photographers to photograph the daily lives of Black people. He trained a generation of rising black photographers, including Ernest Cole, Bob Gosani and later Peter Magubane. Magubane joined DRUM because "they were dealing with social issues that affected black people in South Africa. I wanted to be part of that magazine". Alf Khumalo was another well-known photographer on the staff.

Henry Nxumalo was the first journalist and specialised in investigative reporting. For example, he got a job on a potato farm where he exposed the exploitative conditions (almost slave-like) under which the Black labourers worked. In 1957, Nxumalo was murdered while investigating an abortion racket. His story was the basis for the 2004 film Drum.

Todd Matshikiza wrote witty and informed jazz articles about the burgeoning township jazz scene.

Dolly (the agony aunt) helped many a confused, young lover to get their lives back on course. The "Dear Dolly" letters were written by Dolly Rathebe, a popular actress, pin-up and singer. In reality, they were ghosted by other DRUM writers, notably Casey Motsisi.

Arthur Maimane, under the pseudonym Arthur Mogale, wrote a regular series entitled "The Chief" where he described gangster incidents he had heard about in the shebeens. Don Mattera, a leading Sophiatown gangster, took exception to this. "The gangsters were pissed off with him and there was a word out that we should wipe this guy off."

The office telephonist, David Sibeko, became leader of the Pan-African Congress.

DRUM also encouraged fiction. Es'kia Mphahlele (the fiction editor from 1955 to 1957) encouraged and guided this. During that time over 90 short stories were published by such authors as Todd Matshikiza, Bloke Modisane, Henry Nxumalo, Casey Motsisi, Arthur Maimane (alias Mogale), Lewis Nkosi, Nat Nakasa, Can Themba and others. These stories described the people of the street; jazz musicians, gangsters, shebeen queens and con men and were written in a uniquely Sophiatown-influenced blend of English and Tsotsitaal. This creative period has been called the Sophiatown renaissance.

The backbone of the magazine was crime, investigative reporting, sex (especially if across the colour line) and sport. This was fleshed out by imaginative photography.

The formula worked and made for compulsive reading. Each issue of DRUM was read by up to 9 people, passed from hand to hand on the streets, in the clubs or on the trains. It became a symbol of Black urban life, and 240,000 copies were distributed each month across Africa. This was more than any other African magazine.

DRUM was distributed in 8 different countries: Union of South Africa, Central African Federation, Kenya, Tanganyika, Uganda, Ghana, Nigeria and Sierra Leone.

The newspaper staff encountered difficulties during Apartheid. In 1955, Sophiatown was bulldozed and the writers died or went overseas, and "...The creative output of the Sophiatown Renaissance came to an end as the bulldozers rolled in...."

== Later ownership ==
By May 1965 DRUM had faded and became simply a fortnightly supplement to the Golden City Post, another Bailey property. It was revived in 1968. In 1984, Naspers acquired DRUM Publications, the publisher of City Press, DRUM and True Love & Family.

The parent company of the magazine is Media24 which announced in July 2020 that the print version of the magazine ceased publication due to the COVID-19 pandemic.
