= Tsotsitaal and Camtho =

Variety of mixed languages mainly spoken in the townships of Gauteng province

Tsotsitaal
- Flaaitaal
- Native to: South Africa
- Era: Creolized by 1930, used until ca. 1980. Now L2 only.
- Language family: Tswana creole

Language codes
- ISO 639-3: fly
- Glottolog: tsot1242
- Guthrie code: S40C (Shalambombo)

Camtho
- Isicamtho
- Native to: South Africa
- Era: developed in the 1980s
- Language family: Tsotsitaal–Zulu pidgin

Language codes
- ISO 639-3: cmt
- Glottolog: camt1236
- Guthrie code: S40B

Tsotsitaal (also known as scamto or camtho) is a South African vernacular dialect derived from a variety of mixed languages mainly spoken in the townships of Gauteng province (such as Soweto, Soshanguve, Tembisa), but also in other agglomerations all over South Africa. Tsotsi is a Sesotho, Pedi or Tswana slang word for a "thug" or "robber" or "criminal", possibly from the verb "ho lotsa" "to sharpen", whose meaning has been modified in modern times to include "to con". The word taal in Afrikaans means "language".

A tsotsitaal is built over the grammar of one or several languages, in which terms from other languages or specific terms created by the community of speakers are added. It is a permanent work of language-mix, language-switch, and terms-coining.

== History ==
The tsotsitaal phenomenon originates with one variety known as Flaaitaal or Flytaal, and then Tsotsitaal, which became popular under this latter name in the freehold township of Sophiatown, west of Johannesburg, in the 1940s and 1950s. Tsotsitaal, the original variety, is based on Afrikaans, in which were originally added SeTswana terms, and later terms from IsiXhosa, IsiZulu and other South African languages. Tsotsitaal spread first as a criminal cant, as it had the power of ensuring secrecy when speaking: initially only criminals could understand it.

Later, as a prestigious sign of rebellion against the state and its police, and as gangsters were admired by youths who would see in them examples of success, Tsotsitaal became a youth and street language. At the time, it would exceptionally be heard in households, as tradition did not allow a gangster language to be used in the house. But it quickly became a symbol of the ethnically, culturally, and linguistically mixed culture of Sophiatown. Tsotsitaal is now a moribund variety in the black townships, as its speakers are mainly above the age of 70. However, it has maintained in slightly different forms as a prison language and among the black communities who are Afrikaans-speaking.

From the original Tsotsitaal, the noun tsotsitaal came to refer to any gang or street language in South Africa. However, the specific variety behind the term would depend on the languages actually present in the specific urban environment were one tsotsitaal appears. The most important tsotsitaal nowadays in South Africa is the one from the township of Soweto, the largest township and the place which shows the most diverse linguistic setting in the country.

It was originally known as Iscamtho or Isicamtho (from Zulu, it is a combination of the class 7 prefix isi- here representing language — see Noun classes in Zulu; with a derivation of ukuqamunda [uk’u!amunda], meaning 'to talk volubly'), but it is now more often referred to as Ringas (from English ringers, as in people forming a ring to chat). Other alternative names are Isitsoti or Setsotsi ('the tsotsi language' in Zulu or Sotho), Sekasi (the township language, from the Iscamtho word kasi 'township', itself derived from Afrikaans lokasie), or simply i-taal 'the language'.

However, Iscamtho is quite different from the original Tsotsitaal. It originates in a different criminal argot created in the 1920s by the AmaLaita gang and known as Shalambombo. It is not based on Afrikaans, but on Bantu grammars, mainly Zulu and Sotho. The Zulu-based and Sotho-based varieties are the most widespread in Soweto, but one can actually build Iscamtho over any grammar of the South African Bantu languages, such as Xhosa, Tsonga, Tswana, Venda and others. But as Zulu is the dominant language in Soweto, and as Sotho in Soweto often unifies Sesotho, Setswana and Sepedi in one single variety and is the second most popular language in the township, Iscamtho is more often used "in" Zulu or "in" Sotho.

Tsotsitaal has been a model for Iscamtho, due to the cultural prestige of Sophiatown. But the youth abandoned it in the 1970s, when Afrikaans came to be no more associated with the power of the state, as it had been so far, but was recognized as the language of apartheid and oppression (especially after the 1976 Soweto Uprising). Iscamtho then became the one youth language in Soweto.

== Structure ==
A number of Afrikaans terms from Tsotsitaal have maintained in Iscamtho (such as niks, vandag, goed, maat,"daso", "darr", vrou, vriendin, mooi). Also, the taste of Tsotsitaal-speakers for word transformation, language-mixing and word creation has been transmitted to Iscamtho speakers. Thus, linguistic creativity is the main characteristic of the speakers of the Sowetan language. And although it has different varieties, Iscamtho carries a single identity for all of its speakers, who recognize it as one variety, whatever form it takes.

This is due to the way the language operates: from one grammar which serves as a matrix, the speaker adds words from other languages (including English, Afrikaans, and different Bantu languages) or typically Iscamtho words. One can also create words by modifying existing ones or by coining completely new terms. Thus, Iscamtho and other tsotsitaals experience continuous evolution. Sometimes, new terms made famous by prominent artists can spread extremely quickly and replace older terms.

Iscamtho and Tsotsitaal are very similar in form and in the material which forms their vocabulary. But since the seventies and for political reasons, the use of Afrikaans as a matrix has been excluded in Iscamtho. Due to the popularity of Soweto among Black South African youth, and due also to the importance of Soweto-based artists in the foremost post-apartheid culture, kwaito, Iscamtho has been spreading to other township youths in the country, and different tsotsitaals have been enriched with typically Iscamtho material. Thus a form of "standardization" of tsotsitaals around the norm of Iscamtho might be on its way. This is largely the consequence of the presence of Iscamtho on the radio (through music but also because many national radios are based in Soweto and Johannesburg), on television (in series and entertainment shows) and in the kwaito culture.

== Social meaning ==
As a gangster language, Tsotsitaal originally was a male-only language. The same applies to Iscamtho. A female speaker would then be identified as either a gangster's girlfriend or a prostitute. For male speakers however, the language quickly acquired a meaning of city-slickness and street-wisdom, and mastering it was the proof that one knew the urban environment well enough to cope and not be threatened. However, as Tsotsitaal became the symbol of the cultural life of Sophiatown (before the area was cleared of its residents in the mid-1950s) it was adopted by a number of women. But only the most independent and self-affirmed women would then become Tsotsitaal-speakers.

Due to the importance of gangsterism in Soweto over about four decades and due to the large numbers of Sowetan youths who experienced prison for criminal or political activities in the last two decades of apartheid, the status of Iscamtho changed: from a street language, it became the main language of most youths, started to be spoken within households among the youths, and then between the youths and adults. In the course of the 1980s for the latest, Iscamtho reached the status of mother language for thousands of Sowetan youths, meaning that children learnt Iscamtho in the cradle from their parents along with their family's other languages. Today, the distinction between Iscamtho and urban Zulu or urban Sotho in Soweto tends to be thinner as hundreds of thousands of youths actually speak Iscamtho as a first language.

In addition, a post-apartheid evolution has been the adoption of Iscamtho and other tsotsitaals by many female speakers. Especially, many girls in deep Soweto now have Iscamtho as (one of) their native language(s). Iscamtho as a symbol of youth, city-slickness and the multilingualism of the South African democracy (each language is represented in Iscamtho) has become a language proper for both male and female speakers despite some remaining conservative behaviours and considerations towards female speakers. Especially among the younger lesbian community. Iscamtho is often used as a strong identity marker, and many young lesbians appreciate it and use it as their main language.

Iscamtho has also become a language used in exchanges with older people, who previously would have been offended to be addressed to in the tsotsi language. But as native speakers of Iscamtho refuse to be discriminated against, they often impose their language in exchanges, and consider it as respectful as any other.

== Iscamtho in the media ==
After the abolition of apartheid in South Africa in 1994, kwaito, already a popular music form in South Africa, and its artists came to embrace the use of tsotsitaal in lyrical content. Because they are associated with urban thugs and the criminal subculture, tsotsitaals and Iscamtho are seen by many as a South African form of gangsta slang. However, the language is more than a mere slang, and is referred to by its speakers as "our language". With the advent of rising middle-class and elite Blacks in South Africa after apartheid and the significance of gold to the South African history and culture, the attitudes prevalent in kwaito music appropriate gold to notions of success and wealth. Because of their urban nature and form, tsotsitaals came to be emblematic of the attitudes of post-apartheid South African black poor youth that were largely apolitical, concerned mainly with a representation of success and wealth.

Today, kwaito music using tsotsitaal and more especially Iscamtho can be heard on national radio stations such as YFM (for Youth FM). Some prominent artists such as Zola 7 speak Iscamtho when they appear in the media (Zola 7 especially has its own regular TV show). Iscamtho is also used in advertisement, for all products which aim at the youths. Finally, Iscamtho has spread on television, through youth programs such as series (especially Yizo Yizo), soapies (Rhythm City or Generations) and entertainment shows. From 2007, a local television station opened in Orlando West, Soweto. Called SowetoTV, this station uses Iscamtho as one of its main languages, together with English, Zulu and Sotho. A number of programs for the youths are in Iscamtho only, such as Dlalangeringas (which means “Let's speak Iscamtho”).

Through the media, and considering the symbolic power of Soweto over black township youths, Iscamtho is influencing young speakers of tsotsitaals in South Africa, and many adopt the words or expressions they discover on television or in kwaito. Thus, Iscamtho directly influences and reshapes local tsotsitaals.

== Native Iscamtho-speaking communities ==
Nowadays in Soweto, possibly up to 500,000 youths speak Iscamtho as their main language or one of their main languages. Some of them have learnt it from birth, and master Iscamtho better than any other language. As the South African Constitution provides for everyone to be educated in his/her native language, linguistic problems in the educational system are an important issue in Soweto: children considered by the authorities as being Zulu- or Sotho-speakers are educated in those languages. But the languages used at school are the standard ones. As a result, many pupils face comprehension problems, as they don't really know those rural standards. Some can miss up to 30% of the information which they receive. And teachers are so far not allowed to use Iscamtho, although many of them do it informally.

Also, the issue of language in the judicial system suffers from the non-recognition of Iscamtho. South African citizens have the right to be tried in their language, but dispositions are only provided for the 11 official languages of the country. As a consequence, first-language Iscamtho-speakers face inequalities compared to the rest of the population, as they might be tried in a language which is not the one they master best. On the contrary, when trying to use “their” language at court, they rarely have the opportunity to be supported by a translator who can understand this language, as translators are recruited for their competence in one or more of the 11 official languages.

One should consider that what occurs with native Iscamtho-speaking communities can also be applied to other tsotsitaal speaking communities in South Africa, in the Black townships as well as in the Coloured townships, where Afrikaans-speaking populations have their own tsotsitaals.

When celebrated in the media capacity or space, tsotsi taal speakers are primarily presented in a manner in which the older generations of such a culture would be described; fairly violent, conniving and restless. This kind of media portrayal supports the idea that there is not or cannot be a voice of reason, intelligence, love or even respect among its speakers. This is similar to other marginalised and unofficial languages' portrayal within different societies. The media portrayal may contribute to tsotsi taal's unrecognized status within many communities and institutions; even so, there is a distinct level of respect accompanied by the language that many outsiders may not understand. Tsotsi taal speakers often have a deep sense of solidarity when meeting each other. The term "ka" followed by what the western world would normally call a fist bump was traditionally a shortened versioned term for "kasi" meaning township - a proud expression indicating where one was from - the townships.

== See also ==
- Historical dialects of Afrikaans
- Tsotsi, winner of the 2005 Academy Award for Best Foreign Language Film.
- The Suit (2016 film), a short film directed by Jarryd Coetsee, set in 1950s Sophiatown.
- Mapantsula, a 1988 film directed by Oliver Schmitz.
- Fanagalo
- Pretoria Sotho

== Notes ==
Relevant reading

- Aycard, P. 2008. Speak as You Want to Speak: Just Be Free!, A Linguistic-anthropological Monograph of First-language Iscamtho-speaking Youth in White City, Soweto: Master's thesis, African Studies Centre. Leiden: University of Leiden, Netherlands.
- Brookes, Heather. 2016. Urban youth languages in South Africa: A Case Study of Tsotsitaal in a South African Township. Anthropological Linguistics 56.3-4: 356-388.
- Childs, G.T. 1997. The Status of Isicamtho, an Nguni-Based Urban Variety of Soweto, in Spears, A.K. and Winford, D. (ed.). The Structure and Status of Pidgins and Creoles, Including Selected Papers from the Meeting of the Society for Pidgin and Creole Linguistics, p. 341–367. Amsterdam: John Benjamins.
- Glaser C. 1991. Bo-Tsotsi: the Youth Gangs of Soweto, 1935–1976, Portsmouth, N.H.; Heinemann, Oxford: James Currey.
- Glaser C. 2005. Whistles and Sjamboks: Crime and Policing in Soweto, 1960–1976, in South African Historical Journal, n°52, p. 119–139.
- Hurst, Ellen. 2015. "Overview of the tsotsitaals of South Africa; Their different base languages and common core lexical items." Global Repertoires and Urban Fluidity. Youth Languages in Africa, Nico Nassenstein and Andrea Hollington, (eds.) 169-184. Berlin: de Gruyter.
- Hurst-Harosh, Ellen. "South Africa: Tsotsitaal and urban vernacular forms of South African languages." In Urban contact dialects and language change, pp. 66-85. Routledge, 2022.
- Junction Avenue Theater - Purkey, M. & Stein, P., 1993, Sophiatown Theatre play: Publisher unknown.
- Molamu, L. 2003. Tsotsitaal: A Dictionary of the Language of Sophiatown. Pretoria: UNISA.
- Ntshangase, D.K. 2002. "Language and Language Practices in Soweto, in Mesthrie, R. (ed.), 2002, Language in South Africa, Cambridge: Cambridge University Press, p. 407–418.
- Satyo, S.C. 2001. Kwaito-speak: A Language Variety Created for the Youth by the Youth, in Ridge, E.; Makoni S. & Ridge, S. (ed.). Freedom and Discipline: Essays in Applied Linguistics from Southern Africa, p. 139-148. New Delhi: Bahri Publications.
- Slabbert, S. and Myers-Scotton, C. 1996. The Structure of Tsotsitaal and Isicamtho: Code-Switching and In-Group Identity in South African Townships. Linguistics 34, p. 317–342.
