= Golden City Post =

Tabloid newspaper in South Africa

The Golden City Post was a South African tabloid newspaper that was established in 1955 and run by the same publisher as Drum magazine (established in 1951). The Golden City Post was financed and managed by James Richard Abe Bailey (Jim Bailey) with separate editions published for the Cape and Natal.

Jim Bailey took on the role of editor and paired the "sex and sin" tabloid newspaper with the magazine. Although the Golden City Post today is not remembered as prominently as its sister publication, both the paper and the magazine gave black journalists the copy space to report on the scene in Sophiatown, its jazz singers, boxers, cover girls and their individuals stories while also making visible the inequities, injustices and cruelties facing black urban South Africans under Apartheid. Drum readership grew rapidly and at one time was the largest magazine readership in Africa in any language. When readership declined, The Golden City Post then carried the magazine as a fortnightly supplement. The Golden City Post was sold to the Argus Newspaper in 1971 and then it was shut down on 19 October 1977 as a result of a ban on “black-oriented newspapers” and the imprisonment of journalists.

In 1982, Jim Baily and the South African Associated Newspapers (SAAN) re-launched the paper under a new name, the Golden City Press. The next year “Golden” was removed from the name. The partnership between Baily and SAAN failed and Nasionale Pers (Naspers), purchased both the Golden City Press and Drum magazine on the 1 April 1984. Which was rebranded the City Press.

Len Kalane, the former City Press editor, traces City Press newspaper’s lineage back to the Golden City Post.

Declining print circulation figures led to both Drum magazine’s print edition being shut on July 7, 2020 with the City Press following suit four years later when the final print edition was published in December 22, 2024.
