= Peter Magubane =

South African photographer (1932–2024)

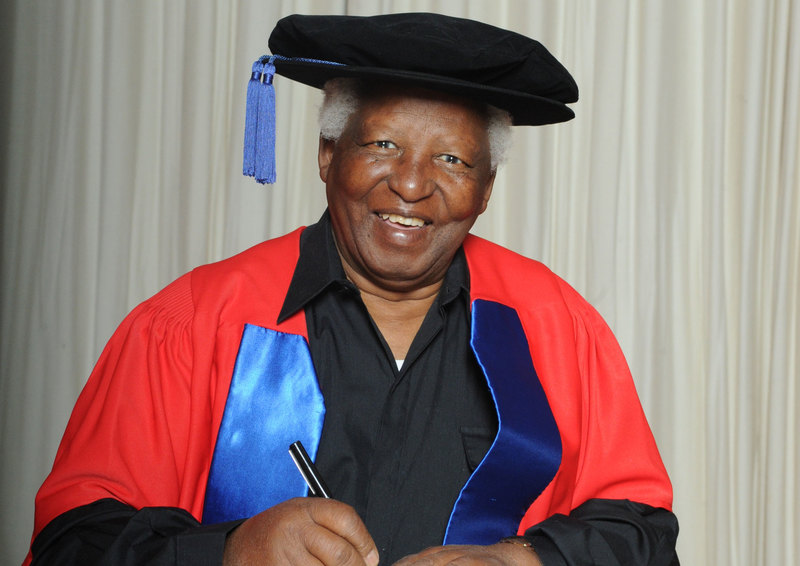
- Magubane received a doctorate in literature (honoris causa) from UCT in 2010
- Born: Peter Sexford Magubane; 18 January 1932; Vrededorp, South Africa
- Died: 1 January 2024 (aged 91); South Africa
- Occupations: Photographer, anti-apartheid activist

Peter Sexford Magubane OMSS (18 January 1932 – 1 January 2024) was a South African photographer and anti-apartheid activist. He began taking photos as a school boy and started professional photography at the Drum. Magubane became one of the first black photographers in South Africa under mentorship of chief photographer Jürgen Schadeberg at the Drum.

Throughout his years as a photographer, Magubane was arrested multiple times for taking photographs deemed offensive to the state. He not only fought apartheid with photography, but he shared his story and the story of numerous black South Africans through his publications. Magubane often included captions or introductory essays for his photography so that the viewer could interpret his images better. He became the personal photographer of President Nelson Mandela in 1990.

== Early life ==
Peter Sexford Magubane was born on 18 January 1932 in Vrededorp (now Pageview, a suburb of Johannesburg); he grew up in Sophiatown. He began taking photographs using a Kodak Brownie box camera gifted to him by his father.

In 1954, he read a copy of Drum, a magazine known for its reporting of urban blacks and the effects of apartheid. "They were dealing with social issues that affected black people in South Africa. I wanted to be part of that magazine." Magubane joined the Drum staff in 1954.

When Magubane started his employment at Drum, he worked his way up the ladder from the positions of darkroom assistant and driver. After six months of odd jobs, he was given a photography assignment under the mentorship of Jürgen Schadeberg, the chief photographer. He borrowed a camera and covered the 1955 ANC convention. "I went back to the office with good results and never looked back."

Being on assignment in the early years was not easy, as he recalled: "We were not allowed to carry a camera in the open if the police were involved, so I often had to hide my camera to get the pictures I wanted. On occasion I hid my camera in a hollowed-out Bible, firing with a cable release in my pocket. At another time, at a trial in Zeerust from which the press were banned, I hid my Leica 3G in a hollowed-out loaf of bread and pretended to eat while I was actually shooting pictures; when the bread went down, I bought milk and hid the camera in the carton. And I got away with it. You had to think fast and be fast to survive in those days."

Magubane photographed most of South Africa's historic moments, such as Sharpeville in 1960 and also Mandela's Rivonia trial in 1964. He later recalled: "I had never seen so many dead people." His editor wanted to know why he had not taken any close-ups. Magubane then "decided I was not going to get emotionally involved, or at least not until after I have done my work."

== Middle and later years ==
Magubane left Drum to become a freelancer. In 1967, he was employed by the Rand Daily Mail. In 1969, he was sent to photograph a demonstration outside Winnie Mandela's jail cell. He was arrested, interrogated and then put in solitary confinement. The charges were dropped in 1970. However, Magubane was banned from photography for five years. In 1971 he was imprisoned again and spent 98 days in solitary confinement and then spent six months in jail.

Following his release, Magubane was assigned to cover the Soweto riots which occurred from June through to August 1976. This was an uprising led by students to protest the apartheid state. The result of the uprising was many students were arrested, beaten, or even shot by the police. Magubane was arrested, beaten up and had his nose broken. Eventually, he was released at the end of 1976. The series of pictures he took brought him international recognition and acclaim. In February 1977, he would win an excellence in journalism award, sponsored by Stellenbosch Farmers' Winery and presented by Walter Cronkite. This led to other opportunities. He worked on assignments for Time magazine, the United Nations and for Sports Illustrated photographing a series about the South African teenage runner Zola Budd.

In 1983, Magubane was awarded the Coretta Scott King Illustrator Award for his book Black Child. This book compiled much of his photography and highlighted the effect of apartheid on black children in South Africa.

In 1985, Magubane spent time in hospital recovering from buckshot wounds received when he was caught in police crossfire at a funeral near Johannesburg.

Magubane became Nelson Mandela's photographer after he was released from prison in 1990. He was Nelson Mandela's photographer until he became president in 1994.

In 2006, the South African Post Office issued a miniature sheet, commemorative envelope and a special canceller postmark on National Women's Day. This commemorates the march on 9 August 1956 when 20,000 women from all parts of South Africa staged a second march on the Union Buildings to protest against the pass laws. They left petitions containing more than 100,000 signatures at the Prime Minister's door. The photograph used on the miniature sheet was taken by Peter Magubane during the march and features some of the women who led the 1956 march: Lillian Ngoyi, Helen Joseph, Sophia Williams-De Bruyn and Rahima Moosa.

Magubane ceased working in photojournalism and later concentrated on art photography. He documented the surviving tribal ways in post-apartheid South Africa in colour. These photographs have been published under the African Heritage Series banner.

Magubane was passionate about what he did but this does not mean that his job as a photographer did not take a toll on his personal life. After witnessing so much violence first-hand, he stated that he became "a feelingless beast" when it came to photography and only processed the tragedies he encountered after they happen. This does not mean that he became indifferent to the struggle of black South Africans but it means that he became desensitized to all the violence he encountered first hand. Magubane's devotion to his job as a photographer made relationships difficult. His erratic working hours and late nights cause his first two marriages to end in divorce. He lost his third wife to cancer in 2002. After he became widowed, Magubane did not remarry.

Magubane died from cancer on 1 January 2024 in South Africa. He is survived by his daughter, Fikile Magubane, and his grandchildren. Peter Magubane's legacy carries on through his images as the photos taken by Magubane continue to inspire future generations to fight for equality.

== Publications ==
- Black As I Am, Zindzi Mandela and Peter Magubane; foreword by Andrew Young, Los Angeles Guild of Tutors Press, 1978, ISBN 0-89615-001-1
- Magubane's South Africa; with a foreword by Ambassador Andrew Young, New York: Alfred A. Knopf, distributed by Random House. 1978, ISBN 0-436-27120-6
- Soweto, photographs by Peter Magubane; text by Marshall Lee; contributing and picture editor, Dawn Lindberg, Cape Town: Don Nelson, 1978, ISBN 0-909238-32-4 (2nd edn. 1983)
- Soweto Speaks, Jill Johnson, photographs by Peter Magubane, Johannesburg: A. D. Donker, 1979, ISBN 0-949937-63-0
- Black Child, New York: Alfred Knopf, 1982, ISBN 0-394-51445-9
- 16 June: The Fruit of Fear, Braamfontein: Skotaville, 1986, ISBN 0-947009-13-2
  - Soweto: The Fruit of Fear, Trenton, N.J.: Africa World Press, 1986, ISBN 0-86543-040-3 (reissue of 16 June: The Fruit of Fear)
- Soweto: Portrait of a City, photography by Peter Magubane; text by David Bristow, Stan Motjuwadi; [foreword by Archbishop Desmond Tutu]. London: New Holland, 1990 ISBN 1-85368-051-6
- Women of South Africa: their fight for freedom, photographs by Peter Magubane, text by Carol Lazar. Boston MA: Little, Brown & Co., 1993 ISBN 0-8212-1928-6
- Nelson Mandela, Man of Destiny: a pictorial biography, Cape Town: Don Nelson, 1996, ISBN 1-86806-123-X
- Vanishing Cultures of South Africa: changing customs in a changing world, Cape Town: Struik, 1998, ISBN 1-86825-967-6 (The Xhosa – The Zulu – The Ndebele – The Venda – The Tsonga – The Basotho – The Tswana – The Pedi – The Ntwana – The San)
- African Renaissance, Cape Town: Struik, 2000, ISBN 1-86872-413-1
- African Heritage Series:
  - Homesteads, Peter Magubane, text by Sandra Klopper, Cape Town: Struik, 2001, ISBN 978-1-86872-517-5
  - Dress and Adornment, Peter Magubane, text by Sandra Klopper, 2001, ISBN 978-1-86872-514-4
  - Ceremonies, Peter Magubane, text by Sandra Klopper, Cape Town: Struik. 2001, ISBN 1-86872-515-4
- Soweto, Peter Magubane and Charlene Smith, Cape Town: Struik, 2001, ISBN 1-86872-584-7
- African Heritage Series:
  - Arts and Crafts, Peter Magubane, text by Sandra Klopper, Cape Town: Struik, 2001, ISBN 1-86872-836-6
- The BaNtwane: Africa's Undiscovered People, Peter Magubane, text by Sandra Klopper, Cape Town: Struik, 2001, ISBN 1-86872-564-2
- AmaNdebele, Peter Magubane, text by Sandra Klopper, Sunbird, 2005, ISBN 1-919938-06-0

== Film and video ==
- Dying to Tell the Story (1998) – Magubane appeared as himself in the documentary
- Peter Magubane Photographer (1999) – BBC Millennium diaries. "Having recorded the turbulent events in South Africa over the past 45 years on camera he tells of the journey to his homeland of today".

== Exhibitions ==
=== Solo exhibitions ===
- 1985 – Photographic Gallery Hippolyte, Helsinki, Finland.
- 2005 – Madiba: Man of Destiny, Standard Bank Gallery, Johannesburg

=== Group exhibitions ===
- 2001 – Soweto – A South African Myth. photographs from the 1950s (by Alf Khumalo, Ernest Cole and Jürgen Schadeberg). The core of the exhibition is the student uprising of 1976. This includes some of Magubane's work.
- 2012–2013 – Rise and Fall of Apartheid: Photography and the Bureaucracy of Everyday Life

== Awards ==
- 1958 – First black South African to win a photographic prize in the country – first and third prizes were awarded to him for Best Press pictures of the year.
- 1985 – Robert Capa Gold Medal
- 1986 – Dr. Erich Salomon Award
- 1992 – Special Missouri Honor Medal for Distinguished Service in Journalism
- 1995 – Martin Luther King Luthuli Award
- 1997 – Lifetime Achievement Award from the Mother Jones Foundation and Leica Cameras
- 1997 – Fellowship by the Tom Hopkinson School of Journalism and Cultural Studies, University of Wales, Cardiff
- 1999 – Order for Meritorious Service Class II from President Mandela
- 2003 – Honorary doctorate degree from the University of South Africa
- 2006 – Honorary doctorate of Philosophy from the University of Fort Hare
- 2006 – Honorary doctorate of Technology from the Tshwane University of Technology
- 2006 – Doctor of Law (honoris causa) Rhodes University
- 2008 – Honorary Fellowship from the Royal Photographic Society, UK
- 2010 – Cornell Capa Infinity Award from the International Center of Photography
- 2010 – Honorary doctorate degree from Columbia College (Chicago)
- 2015 – Nat Nakasa Award for Media Integrity
- 2023 – Van Toeka Af Living Legends Recognition award
