= Jürgen Schadeberg =

German-born South African photographer and artist (1931–2020)

- Born: 18 March 1931; Berlin, Germany
- Died: 29 August 2020 (aged 89); La Drova, Valencia, Spain
- Known for: Photography

Jürgen Schadeberg (18 March 1931 – 29 August 2020) was a German-born South African photographer and artist. He photographed key moments in South African history, including iconic photographs such as Nelson Mandela at Robben Island prison. He also lived, worked and taught in London and Spain, and photographed in many African countries.

His work is held in the collections of the UK Arts Council, National Portrait Gallery, Tate and the Victoria and Albert Museum in London.

== Life ==
Jürgen Schadeberg was born in Berlin, Germany, in 1931 where he grew up during the Nazi regime and World War II. In the aftermath of the war, his mother began a relationship with a British officer in the army of occupation and emigrated with him to South Africa in 1947. Schadeberg learned to be a photographer at the Deutsche Presseagentur (German Press Agency). He moved to South Africa to rejoin his family in 1950 and, the following year, found employment on Drum magazine as official photographer and layout artist.

Schadeberg became the senior figure of the group and a teacher and mentor to some of the most creative South African photographers of his time, including Bob Gosani, Ernest Cole, and later Peter Magubane. As one of the few white photographers who photographed daily life among the black community, he became knowledgeable about black life and culture. As a result, he captured on film the beginnings of the freedom movement, the effects of apartheid, and the vibrancy of township life. Schadeberg photographed many historic and pivotal events in the 1950s among them the Defiance Campaign of 1952, the 1956 Treason Trial, the Sophiatown removals of 1955, the Sophiatown jazz and social scene, the Sharpeville funeral of 1960, and pictures of Robben Island inmates. Some of the famous people he photographed include Nelson Mandela, Walter Sisulu, Oliver Tambo, Trevor Huddleston, and Govan Mbeki. He also documented 1950s jazz legends such as Thandi Klaasen, Hugh Masekela, Kippie Moeketsi and Miriam Makeba. He made documentations of everyday life. When Drum wanted the singer Dolly Rathebe to be the cover girl for one of their issues, Schadeberg took her to a Johannesburg mine dump and photographed her in a bikini. The two were arrested for contravening the Immorality Act which forbade interracial relationships.

In 1959, Schadeberg left Drum to become a freelancer. He was part of an expedition led by Professor Phillip V. Tobias from the University of the Witwatersrand to study the Bushmen, publishing images in The Kalahari Bushmen Dance in 1982.

Schadeberg felt forced by increasing civil unrest to leave South Africa, and in 1964 went to London, where he was picture editor of Camera Owner magazine (forerunner of Creative Camera), into which he incorporated a stronger sense of design and increased its pictorial content, and from April to July 1965 he was its editor. He also taught and curated photographic exhibitions in England, notably for the Whitechapel Art Gallery. He then moved to Spain where he focused on a career as an artist. In 1972, he returned to Africa where he accepted a position as photographer for Christian Aid in Botswana and Tanzania. In 1973 he travelled in Senegal, Mali, Kenya and Zaire, taking photographs.

In 1985, Schadeberg returned to South Africa, where he lived with his wife Claudia. He continued to work as a photojournalist, and also made documentaries about the black community until 2007, when he returned to Europe.

== Death ==
Schadeberg died from a stroke at his home in La Drova, Valencia, Spain, on 29 August 2020, aged 89.

== Publications ==
- The Fifties People of South Africa : the lives of some ninety-five people who were influential in South Africa during the fifties, a period which saw the first stirrings of the coming revolution / with photos by Bob Gosani ... [et al.], Bailey's African Photo Archives, 1987, ISBN 0-620-10529-1
- The Finest photos from the old Drum, Bailey's African Photo Archives, 1987; Penguin Books [distributor], ISBN 0-620-10581-X
- The Kalahari Bushmen Dance, Jürgen Schadeberg, 1982, ISBN 0-7045-0472-3
- Nelson Mandela and the Rise of the ANC / compiled and edited by Jürgen Schadeberg; photographs by Ian Berry ... [et al.]; text by Benson Dyantyi ...[et al.], Jonathan Ball, 1990, ISBN 0-947464-18-2
- Sof'town Blues: (Note: Sof'town is an abbreviation for Sophiatown) images from the black '50s, J. Schadeberg, 1994, ISBN 0-9583980-1-1
- Voices from Robben Island, Ravan Press, 1994, ISBN 0-86975-454-8
- The Black and White Fifties : Jürgen Schadeberg's South Africa, Protea, 2001, ISBN 1-919825-71-1
- Soweto today, Protea Book House, 2002, ISBN 1-919825-72-X
- Who Killed Mr. Drum? / Sylvester Stein / photography by Jürgen Schadeberg, Corvo Books, 2003, ISBN 0-9543255-1-6
- The Book of Life, UN Development Programme, 2004, ISBN 0-620-33285-9
- Witness: 52 Years of Pointing Lenses at Life, Protea Book House, 2004, ISBN 1-86919-067-X
- Voices from the Land, Protea Book House, 2005, ISBN 1-86919-105-6
- Tales from Jozi, Protea Book House, 2007, ISBN 978-1-86919-175-7
- Jürgen Schadeberg, Hatje Cantz Verlag, edited by Ralf-P. Seippel, 2008, German/English/French, ISBN 978-3-7757-2150-9

== Film and video ==
- Ernest Cole — Video, 52 minutes. The life and work of a courageous and pioneering black photographer
- Voices from Robben Island — 16 mm, 90 minutes. The history of the infamous island prison, a BBC co-production
- Have You Seen Drum Recently? — 35 mm, 77 minutes. The vibrant and turbulent 1950s in South Africa, with original music and photographs from Drum magazine.
- The seven ages of music — Video, 56 minutes. A musical trip through history, from San singing to Hugh Masekela
- Dolly & the Inkspots — Video, 26 minutes. The life and memories of this legendary jazz singing combination

== Collections ==
Schadeberg's work is held in the following permanent collections:

- Arts Council Collection, UK: 2 prints (as of September 2020)
- National Portrait Gallery, London: 8 prints (as of September 2020)
- Tate, London: 3 prints (as of September 2020)
- Victoria and Albert Museum, London: 2 prints (as of September 2020)
