= Jellel Gasteli =

French-Tunisian photographer (born 1958)

- Born: 1958; Tunis, Tunisia
- Education: École Nationale Supérieure de la Photographie in Arles, France
- Known for: Photography
- Notable work: La Série Blanche
- Website: www.jellelgasteli.com

Jellel Gasteli (born in Tunis in 1958) is a French–Tunisian photographer. He is best known for his minimalistic "White Series" (La Série Blanche), which captures the geometry of light and shadow on traditional white-washed Tunisian buildings. Having lived many years in Paris, Gasteli is currently residing in Tunis.

Gasteli's work was included in the exhibition Africa Remix at the Mori Art Museum.
