= Market Theatre (Johannesburg) =

Theatre situated in Newtown, Johannesburg est. 1976

Coordinates: 26.201654°S 28.032389°E

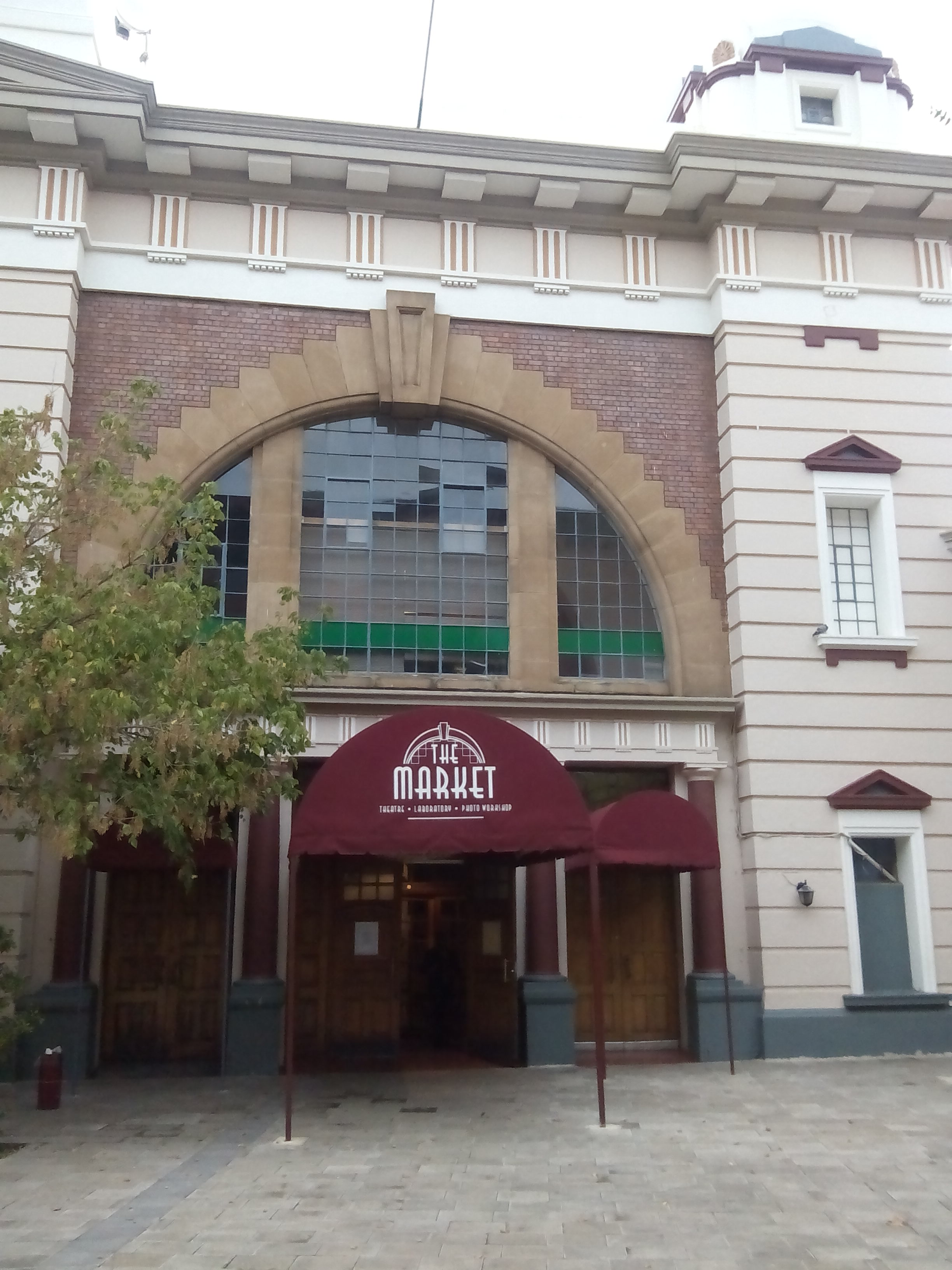
- The John Kani Theatre
- Interactive map of the Market Theatre area

General information
- Location: 56 Margaret Mcingana Street; Johannesburg; South Africa; 2001, South Africa
- Inaugurated: 21 June 1976

Website
- www.markettheatre.co.za

The Market Theatre, based in the downtown bohemian suburb of Newtown in Johannesburg, South Africa, was opened in 1976, operating as an independent, anti-racist theatre during the country's apartheid regime. It was named after a fruit and vegetable market that was previously located there. It was also known as the Old Indian Market or the Newtown Market, which closed after 60 years. The Market Theatre was founded by Barney Simon (Artistic Director), Mannie Manim (Administrative Director), Aletta Bezuidenhout, Vanessa Cooke, Judith Cornell, David Eppel, Leoni Hofmeyer, Janice Honeyman, Danny Keogh, Sue Kiel, Lindsay Reardon, and John Oakley Smith. Two of the theatres are named after the two founders Barney Simon and Mannie Mannim. Main Theatre at the Market Theatre was renamed as The John Kani Theatre in 2014 after the renowned South African stage actor John Kani.

== History ==
=== Structure ===
In 1974, a group of theatre people formed The Company. The founders included Mannie Manim and the late Barney Simon. They began fundraising to restore the neglected complex that housed the old produce market in downtown Johannesburg.

The original steel structure had been shipped from Britain and constructed on site. The steel arches and cathedral-like dome built in 1913 that housed the Indian Fruit Market were considered one of the most important pieces of organic architecture in South Africa. On Sundays, the main hall of the complex was used for symphony concerts.

Renovation began, with much of the work being done by the artists themselves. Today most of the original Edwardian architecture remains, as do a number of the original signs. It houses both Museum Africa and The Market Theatre complex.

=== Importance during apartheid ===
By the 1970s, there was heavy international pressure for South Africa to reform its apartheid laws. It was during this turbulent time, on 21 June 1976, that the Market Theatre opened its doors, with Barney Simon as its artistic director. The first production, under his direction, was The Seagull by Anton Chekhov with Sandra Prinsloo in the cast. In time the non-racial Market Theatre became known internationally as the "Theatre of the Struggle." It was one of the few places in the 1980s that blacks and whites could mix on equal terms. "The strength and truth of that conviction was acknowledged (...) In providing a voice to the voiceless, The Market Theatre did not forego artistic excellence, but, rather, made a point of it."

A multitude of anti-apartheid plays were staged, including Reza de Wet's multi award-winning, Diepe Grond, and Woza Albert, Asinamali, Bopha, Sophiatown, You Strike The Woman, You Strike A Rock, Born in the RSA and Black Dog – Inj’emnyama. The Market Theatre's cultural contribution to South Africa's emergence as a democracy in 1994 is significant.

In 1981, the theatre staged the first Afrikaans translation of a play by Athol Fugard. The play, Hello and Goodbye, attracted a predominantly Afrikaner audience and some Afrikaans-speaking Coloureds.

In 1987, Janet Suzman made her directorial debut, staging a production of Shakespeare's Othello at the theatre. Suzman offered the titular role to John Kani, who sought the blessing of Mongane Wally Serote before accepting. Kani accepted and the play attracted both white and black audiences. It was significant too in the context of apartheid South Africa, to feature a black and white romantic relationship.

=== Awards ===
In 1995, the Market Theatre was the recipient of the American Jujamcyn Award to honour a South African theatre organisation that had made an outstanding contribution to the development of creative talent in the history of the country's theatre. During its history, the Market Theatre has received 21 international awards and more than 300 South African awards, which include Fleur du Cap and Naledi Theatre Awards.

== Facilities ==
The Market Theatre complex houses three theatres: the Barney Simon Theatre (opened on 21 June 1976), the Main Theatre (opened in October 1976) and the Laager Theatre (named in 1979). In addition to hosting productions, the theatres are also used for conferences, seminars, presentations and product launches.

=== Barney Simon Theatre ===
Named after one of the co-founders of the Market Theatre, and a stalwart of the South African theatre industry, the Barney Simon Theatre was the first to open in the Market Theatre complex, while restorations to the historical building were still in progress. It has seating for 120 people.

=== Main Theatre ===
Four months after the Market Theatre opened with the staging of The Seagull, the Main Theatre opened to the public on 19 October 1976. The first production was Peter Weiss's Marat/Sade.

The Main Theatre is the largest of the three theatres of the Market Theatre complex and seats up to 387 people.

=== Laager Theatre ===
The first show to be staged in what was once a photo gallery in the Market Theatre complex was called Die Van Aardes Van Grootoor in August 1978. The theatre was named the Laager by prominent theatre personality and social activist Pieter-Dirk Uys in 1979.

A laager, also known as a wagon fort, is a fortification made of wagons joined together, usually in a circular shape, as an improvised military camp to safeguard those taking refuge inside. Pieter then found the name Laager appropriate for he too needed a safe place to perform under the apartheid regime.

=== Other ===
The Market Theatre complex also houses two art galleries, a jazz club, a cabaret venue, a bookshop, two restaurants (the Market Bar & Bistro and the historical Gramadoelas), a coffee bar, a theatre bar, a shopping mall, and a flea-market every Saturday.

== Development ==
The Market Photo Workshop is a school of photography that has been in operation for more than 20 years, with a special focus on introducing the art of photography to previously disadvantaged students.

The Rockefeller Foundation provided the seed money to start the Market Theatre Laboratory, a drama school founded by Barney Simon and Dr John Kani. The Lab opened in October 1989 in a small warehouse under the highway in Goch Street, Newtown.

From 1994, the Lab and later the Market Theatre formed a long-term partnership with the Swedish International Development Agency (SIDA) and Stockholm City Theatre. The Lab holds two annual festivals, the Community Theatre Festival and the Zwakala Festival.

In 2010, the Market Theatre Laboratory moved to the Bus Factory, 3 President Street, Newtown, where the Market Photo Workshop is also located.

== Selection of featured artists ==
Over the years, the Market Theatre hosted performances by a number of internationally acclaimed artists, including Athol Fugard. The great South African actress Yvonne Bryceland and collaborator of Athol Fugard was also involved in the evolution of the Market Theatre as a centre of theatre against apartheid. In October 1987 Janet Suzman directed a multi-racial production of Othello at The Market Theatre. Suzman also directed Bertolt Brecht's Good Woman of Setzuan (renamed The Good Woman of Sharpeville).

Theatre Makers who have been linked to the Market Theatre include:

Vanessa Cooke Janice Honeyman Paul Slabolepszy Pieter Dirk Uys Lara Foot Maishe Maponya Malcolm Purkey Robert Whitehead Yael Farber Sue Pam-Grant Clare Stopford Fatima Dike Fiona Ramsay Dorothy Ann Gould Maralin Vanrenen Thoko Ntshinga John Ledwaba Neil McCarthy Ramoloah Makhene Robert Colman Toni Morkel Bruce Koch Lucille Gillwald Mnsedisi Shabangu James Whyle Aletta Bezuidenhout Jacqui Singer Nomsa Nene Nadya Cohen Bill Flynn Megan Wilson Martin Le Maitre Irene Stephanou Sarah Roberts Wesley France Craig Higginson Timmy Kwebulana Nandi Nyembe Bobby Heaney Zane Meas Gcina Mhlope Handspring Puppet Company And many others...

== See also ==
- "The Suit", a short story by Can Themba, first adapted into a play by Barney Simon and Mothobi Mutloatsi and performed at the Market Theatre in 1994.
