= Can Themba =

South African short-story writer (1924–1967)

- Born: Daniel Canodoise Themba'; 21 June 1924; Marabastad, Pretoria, South Africa
- Died: 8 September 1967 (aged 43); Manzini, Swaziland
- Education: Fort Hare University College
- Occupation: Journalist
- Spouse: Anna Themba
- Writing career
- Genre: Short story
- Notable works: "The Suit"; The World of Can Themba

Daniel Canodoise "Can" Themba (21 June 1924 – 8 September 1967) was a South African short-story writer.

== Biography ==
Themba was born in Marabastad, near Pretoria, but wrote most of his work in Sophiatown, Johannesburg, South Africa. The town was destroyed under the provisions of the apartheid Group Areas Act, which reassigned ethnic groups to new areas. He was a student at Fort Hare University College, where he received an English degree (first-class) and a teacher's diploma.

After moving to Sophiatown, he tried his hand at short-story writing. Temba entered the first short story contest of Drum (a magazine for urban black people concentrating mainly on investigative journalism), which he won.

He subsequently worked for Drum, where he became one of the "Drum Boys", together with Henry Nxumalo, Bloke Modisane, Todd Matshikiza, Stan Motjuwadi and Casey Motsisi. They were later joined by Lewis Nkosi and Nat Nakasa. This group lived by the dictum: "Live fast, die young and have a good-looking corpse."

Part of Drum's ethos was investigative journalism. One of the aims was to show the realities and inequities of apartheid. Themba decided to see how white churches would react to his attending services.

The Presbyterian Church in Noord Street allowed me in, yet the one in Orange Grove refused me admittance. They explained that the hall was rented from some boys' club whose policy did not allow Non-whites into the hall. They also said something about the laws of the country.

At the Kensington DRC (Dutch Reform Church), an aged church official was just about to close the doors when he saw me. He bellowed in Afrikaans: 'Wat soek jy?' (What do you want?). 'I've come to church', I said. He shoved me violently, shouting for me to get away. I walked off dejected.

A few doors away was the Baptist Church, and as I walked towards it I began to think that people didn't want me to share their church. As I walked through the Baptist door I was tense, waiting for that tap on the shoulder…but instead I was given a hymn book and welcomed into the church. I sat through the service… This up and down treatment wasn't doing my nerves much good.

— Can Themba, The Will to Die

Growing frustrations with the restrictions of apartheid caused him to move to Swaziland, where he worked as a teacher. In 1966, he was declared a "statutory communist", as a result of which his works were banned in South Africa.

He died of Coronary thrombosis in his flat in Manzini on 8 September 1967.

== Writing ==
His literary output was only readily available in the 1980s with the publication of two collections, The Will to Die (1972) and The World of Can Themba (1985).

In his stories, he described the trials and tribulations of university-educated urban Black people, unable to realise their true potential because of apartheid and struggling to balance their modern urban cultures with their historical rural tribal ones.

In Themba's final years, his increasing dependency on alcohol led to darker, more introspective pieces, such as "Crepuscle", "The Will to Die", and "The Bottom of the Bottle".

Themba's most famous story, "The Suit", was first published in 1963 in the inaugural issue of The Classic, a South African literary journal founded by Nat Nakasa. The story is about Philemon, a middle-class lawyer, and his wife, Matilda, who live in Sophiatown. One day, Philemon hears that his wife is having an affair, so he goes home in the middle of the day and catches her in the middle of having sex with her lover, who jumps out of the window to escape, leaving behind his suit. Philemon then dreams up a strange and bizarre punishment. Matilda has to treat the suit as an honoured guest, feed it, entertain it, and take it out for walks. This serves as a constant reminder of her adultery. A remorseful Matilda eventually dies of humiliation. Too late, Philemon regrets his actions.

A stage version of The Suit was created by Mothobi Mutloatse and Barney Simon at the Market Theatre in Johannesburg in the early 1990s. It was subsequently translated into French as Le Costume by Barney Simon and Jean-Claude Carrière for a production by Peter Brook in Paris in 1994, revived in London in 2012. In 2016, Jarryd Coetsee wrote and directed a short film adapted from the story.

== Awards ==
- South African Order of Ikhamanga in Silver for "Excellent achievement in literature, contributing to the field of journalism and striving for a just and democratic society in South Africa" (posthumous).

== Books ==
- Deep Cuts: graphic adaptations of stories by Can Themba, Alex La Guma & Bessie Head / project co-ordinator: Neil Napper; editor: Peter Esterhuysen, Maskew Miller, Longman, 1993, ISBN 0-636-01896-2
- The Suit by Can Themba; adapted by Chris van Wyk; illustrated by Renée Koch. Viva Books, 1994. ISBN 1-874932-14-X
- The Will To Die / Can Themba; selected by Donald Stuart and Roy Holland, Heinemann, 1972. ISBN 0-435-90104-4
- The World of Can Themba: selected writings of the late Can Themba, edited by Essop Patel, Ravan Press, 1985. ISBN 0-86975-145-X
- Requiem for Sophiatown. London: Penguin, 2006. ISBN 9780143185482

== Sources ==
- Mike Nicol, Good-looking Corpse: World of Drum – Jazz and Gangsters, Hope and Defiance in the Townships of South Africa, Secker & Warburg, 1991, ISBN 0-436-30986-6
- Anthony Adams & Ken Durham (eds), Writing from South Africa, Cambridge University Press, ISBN 0-521-43572-2, contains "Mob Passion" by D. Can Themba.
