= Nat Nakasa =

South African writer and journalist (1937–1965)

- Born: 12 May 1937; Durban, Natal, South Africa
- Died: 14 July 1965 (aged 28); Harlem, New York, US
- Resting place: Chesterville, KwaZulu-Natal
- Education: Nieman Fellow
- Alma mater: Harvard University
- Occupations: Journalist and editor
- Employer(s): Drum, The Rand Daily Mail
- Known for: Drum, Rand Daily Mail, The Classic

Nathaniel Ndazana Nakasa (12 May 1937 – 14 July 1965), better known as Nat Nakasa, was a South African journalist and short story writer.

== Early life ==
Nat Nakasa was born in outside Durban, South Africa, on 12 May 1937; his mother Alvina was a teacher while his father Chamberlain was a typesetter and writer. Nakasa was one of five children. He attended the mission school, Zulu Lutheran High School in Eshowe, completing his junior certificate.

== Journalism ==
After leaving school, aged 17, he returned to Durban and after many jobs, two friends helped him find a job a year later as a junior reporter at the Ilanga Lase Natal, a Zulu-language weekly. After his reporting attracted the attention of Sylvester Stein of Drum magazine, Nakasa joined the magazine in 1957. He and the other journalists writing at the Drum were influenced by the Suppression of Communism Act, 1950 and had to show the effects of Apartheid indirectly on black lives without condemning it directly for fear of being banned from practising journalism.

With the Sharpeville Massacre of 1960, the world took an interest in South Africa and so in 1961, Nakasa was asked to write an article entitled "The Human Meaning of Apartheid" for The New York Times.Drum struggled to keep its black writers, due to the severe restriction they found themselves in and many went into exile in Europe or America. In 1963, Nakasa announced the formation of a quarterly literary magazine called The Classic, an English-language publication for African intellectual writers and poets from any race around Africa. The first year's printing would be funded by Professor John Thompson of the Farfield Foundation, that unknown to Nakasa was funded by the CIA in order to cultivate a pro-American intellectual elite around the world. The Classic was first published in June 1963 and featured writers such as Can Themba, Es'kia Mphahlele, and Casey Motsisi. Doris Lessing and Léopold Sédar Senghor would feature in other issues and the magazine would later be edited by writer Barney Simon. In 1963, the Publications and Entertainment Act was passed, which allowed the South African government broad powers to ban or censor content it deemed unfavourable to the interest of the country, further hindering Nakasa's work, as he attempted to stay within the law.

In 1964, Nakasa applied for a Nieman Fellowship, a journalism program at Harvard University out of fear for his future employment prospects in South Africa and was accepted for 1965 intake. At the same time, Allister Sparks, editorial page editor of the white anti-apartheid newspaper The Rand Daily Mail, invited Nakasa to write a black perspective column for the paper. On accepting a Nieman Fellowship, Nakasa applied for a passport; however, like many other black intellectuals, he was refused and had to accept an exit permit instead, which meant relinquishing his citizenship and not being allowed to return to South Africa. Unbeknown to Nakasa, the South African police had been monitoring him since 1959 and were about to issue him with a five-year banning order under the Suppression of Communism Act when he left for the United States in October 1964.

Nakasa soon found that racism existed in America as well, albeit more subtly than in South Africa. He did not like New York City and soon moved to Cambridge, Massachusetts, where he spent his time at Harvard "steeped in the somber business of education". While attending the Nieman Fellowship, he participated in protest meetings against Apartheid at Cambridge, Massachusetts, and in Washington DC, and unsuccessfully attempted again to write an article for The New York Times.

He completed his Nieman Fellowship at the end of June 1965, by which time he was short of money and his attempt to extend his visa beyond August seemed unsuccessful. Now living in Harlem, New York City, he wrote articles for several newspapers after leaving Harvard, appeared in the television film The Fruit of Fear and was planning to write a biography of Miriam Makeba, but two days before his death he told a friend, "I can't laugh any more and when I can't laugh I can't write." Nakasa seemed homesick, unable to return to South Africa, unsettled and drinking, he became depressed and confessed to his friend Nadine Gordimer that he was worried he had inherited his mother's mental illness. On 14 July 1965, Nakasa died by suicide when he jumped from his friend's seventh-storey apartment.

== Death ==
As it was not possible to bring his body home, Nakasa was buried at the Ferncliff cemetery in upstate New York.

A headstone placed by the Nieman Foundation 30 years later simply reads:

Nathaniel Nakasa May 12, 1937 – July 14, 1965. Journalist, Nieman Fellow, South African.

— 1038 (the tombstone number).

=== Reburial ===
A project was begun in May 2014 to return his body to South Africa. His remains were returned to South Africa on 19 August 2014. "This will hopefully bring closure to a horrific chapter that has remained a blight in our history for almost 50 years. His homecoming is the restoration of his citizenship and dignity as a human being", said Nathi Mthethwa, South Africa's minister of arts and culture.

He was re-buried on 13 September 2014 near his childhood home in Chesterville, a township outside Durban. The ceremony was preceded by a procession of his coffin through Chesterville before his remains were interred at Chesterville's Heroes Acre.

== Books ==
- The World of Nat Nakasa: selected writings of the late Nat Nakasa/edited by Essop Patel; with an introduction by Nadine Gordimer, Ravan Press, 1971, ISBN 0-86975-050-X

== See also ==
- List of South African writers
- Nat Nakasa Award for Media Integrity
