= Jarryd Coetsee =

South African writer and filmmaker

- Born: 5 August 1982 (age 43); Pretoria, South Africa
- Occupation(s): Writer, filmmaker

Jarryd Coetsee (born 5 August 1982) is a South African writer and filmmaker. His short film, The Suit won numerous international awards.

== Early life and education ==
Coetsee was born in Pretoria where he attended Pretoria Boys High School. When he was 19, he was a Semi-Finalist in the Chesterfield Writers' Fellowship originated at Steven Spielberg's Amblin Entertainment in Los Angeles. He completed a Master of Arts in Screenwriting at the London Metropolitan Film School (Met Film School) at Ealing Studios, part of the University of West London. Initially, he was accepted into a Master's program in Filmmaking but chose to shift his focus to Screenwriting midway through. Coetsee was awarded a merit scholarship from the Oppenheimer Memorial Trust for his talent and portfolio, as well as the Voices That Matter Scholarship, aimed at supporting diversity, inclusion, and accessibility in the screen industries.

Before his studies in London, Coetsee was accepted into the University of Oxford to pursue a Master of Studies (MSt) in the History of Art, and was a finalist for the Chevening Scholarship of the British Foreign and Commonwealth Office. However, he chose to follow his passion for screenwriting and filmmaking.

Coetsee also holds a Master of Arts Degree in English Literature which he passed with cum laude distinction from the University of Stellenbosch, where he authored a thesis on themes of identity in the 1970s East African travel literature of Trinidadian author Shiva Naipaul. Additionally, he has a Bachelor of Arts with Honors in Film Studies from the University of Cape Town and studied Filmmaking and Film Production at South African institutions, including AFDA (the South African School of Motion Picture Medium and Live Performance) in Cape Town, and South Africa's oldest film school, the Motion Picture Academy at Pretoria Technikon (now the Tshwane University of Technology). Coetsee has contributed to the industry as a juror at the Scotland African Film Festival in Glasgow and Edinburgh.

== Career ==
His short film, The Suit, won numerous international awards including the Best Short Film Award at the 11th SAFTAs and has been shown in 83 cities and towns in over 20 countries. The film features performances by Tony Award-winner John Kani and Atandwa Kani. Three of the film festivals for which it was selected are Oscar qualifiers (Urbanworld Film Festival, Pan African Film Festival and BronzeLens Film Festival). Coetsee was the only filmmaker from Africa selected by the Académie des Arts et Techniques du Cinéma for its prestigious Les Nuits en Or 2017 (Golden Nights 2017) which saw him participate in film-related programmes in France, Italy and Greece, and receiving an award from UNESCO at its headquarters, the World Heritage Centre, in Paris for The Suit which was selected as one of the thirty top short films from around the world.

=== Filmography ===
Year(s)	Title(s)	Writer(s)	Producer(s)	Studio(s)
2016	The Suit	Jarryd Coetsee	Luke Sharland	Mandala Films
