= Arthur Mayisela =

South African boxer

Personal information
- Nicknames: The Fighting Prince; The People's Champ
- Nationality: South African
- Born: Arthur Mayisela; September 20, 1953 Soweto, Johannesburg, South Africa
- Died: September 17, 1986 (aged 32) South Africa
- Weight: Super light Welterweight

Boxing career
- Stance: Orthodox

Boxing record
- Total fights: 26
- Wins: 20
- Losses: 4
- Draws: 2
- No contests: 0

Arthur "The Fighting Prince" Mayisela (born 20 September 1953 – 17 September 1986) was a South African professional boxer who competed in the super light (Light welterweight) and welterweight divisions from 1980 to 1986.

== Early life ==
Mayisela was born in Soweto, a township southwest of Johannesburg, on 20 September 1953. Growing up under the oppressive laws of apartheid, he turned to the sport of boxing at a young age to navigate the harsh socio-economic conditions of the township.

== Professional career ==
Mayisela made his professional boxing debut on 22 March 1980, defeating Nkululeko Nkosi in Soweto.

Called "The People's Champ" by his loyal fans, Mayisela became a cultural and sporting figure during the apartheid era and a symbol of hope and unity for South Africa’s Black majority during a time of intense political and social unrest. In September 1982, Mayisela won the Transvaal Light Welterweight title by defeating Ernest Moledi. He went on to capture the South African Super Light Championship in February 1984 with a victory over Nkosana Mgxaji.

One of the highlights of his career occurred on 30 November 1985 at Sun City, where his opponent was the highly rated white South African prospect Brian Baronet. Baronet, who was on the verge of a world title shot, was handed a surprise defeat when Mayisela secured a high-profile victory, instantly elevating his status to a national sporting hero.

=== Welterweight step-up ===
In June 1986, Mayisela stepped up to the welterweight division to challenge veteran champion Harold Volbrecht for the South African Welterweight Title, and the bout at Sun City ended in a draw when the two boxers accidentally bumped heads during the match, with Volbrecht suffering a cut on his forehead. His final professional fight took place on 6 September 1986, where he secured a victory against Antonio Guerra at the Crown Mines Showgrounds in Johannesburg.

== Death and legacy ==
Mayisela died on 17 September 1986, three days before his 33rd birthday, when he was killed in a tragic traffic accident. Mayisela is remembered for leveraging his platform to foster hope. During the heightened state of emergency and political violence in South Africa in the mid-1980s, his fights served as rare, cross-cultural gatherings where Black and white fans could temporarily transcend apartheid divisions to appreciate world-class athletics.

=== Posthumous honors ===
In November 2021, the South African Presidency honored Mayisela's legacy by posthumously awarding him the Order of Ikhamanga (Silver). The national order recognized his exceptional skill, his contribution to South African boxing, and his status as "The Fighting Prince" who brought joy to the masses during a bleak period in the nation's history.

== Professional boxing record ==
Res.	Record	Opponent	Type	Date	Location	Notes
Win	20–4–2	Antonio Guerra	PTS	6 Sep 1986	Johannesburg, Gauteng	
Draw	19–4–2	Harold Volbrecht	PTS	14 Jun 1986	Sun City, North West	For South African Welterweight Title
Win	19–4–1	Pedro Avila	PTS	15 Mar 1986	Sun City, North West	
Loss	18–4–1	Brett Taylor	PTS	8 Feb 1986	Johannesburg, Gauteng	For South African Super Light Title
Win	18–3–1	Brian Baronet	PTS	30 Nov 1985	Sun City, North West	For South African Super Light Title
Win	17–3–1	Julius Mnwana	PTS	23 Mar 1985	Springs, Gauteng	For South African Super Light Title
Win	16–3–1	Stephen Balene	PTS	16 Feb 1985	Boksburg, Gauteng	
Win	15–3–1	Najib Daho	PTS	25 Aug 1984	Boksburg, Gauteng	
Win	14–3–1	Adolfo Omar Arce Rossi	PTS	25 May 1984	Springs, Gauteng	
Win	13–3–1	Nkosana Mgxaji	PTS	18 Feb 1984	East London, Eastern Cape	Won South African Super Light Title
