= Sylvia Glasser =

South African dancer and choreographer (born 1940)

- Born: 1940 (age 85–86); Polokwane, South Africa
- Education: University of the Witwatersrand, bachelor's degree, 1973 University of Houston–Clear Lake, master's degree in dance, 1997
- Occupations: Dancer and choreographer
- Known for: Pioneering the dance genre Afrofusion
- Awards: Lifetime Achievement Award from the Tunkie Arts and Culture Trust (2005)

Sylvia Glasser (born 1940) is a South African dancer and choreographer known as a pioneer of Afrofusion, a dance genre that combines African culture with Western modern dance. She served as founding director of the influential dance company Moving into Dance from 1978 to 2013.

== Early life and education ==
Sylvia Glasser was born into a white Jewish family in Pietersburg, now Polokwane, South Africa, in 1940.

She moved to England to study dance at the London College of Drama and Dance, where she graduated in 1963. She later obtained a bachelor's degree from the University of the Witwatersrand, in 1973; pursued further studies in anthropology at Witwatersrand in the late 1980s; and graduated with a master's in dance from University of Houston–Clear Lake in the United States in 1997.

== Career ==
Returning to South Africa from the U.K., Glasser established herself in the local dance scene with the Experimental Dance Theatre, an annual platform she founded in 1967. By the late 1970s, she had become a prominent figure in the modern dance community of South Africa. Beginning in 1978, she was the founder and longtime director of the influential company Moving into Dance, whose dancers affectionately call her Magogo, meaning "mother" or "grandmother." Notable artists who trained with Glasser include Vincent Mantsoe, Gregory Maqoma, Moeketsi Koena, and Portia Mashigo.

Her choreography blends South African, African and Western traditions and techniques, which came to be known as Afrofusion, a style that would come to be adopted by many dancers and musical artists. Her seminal work of choreography Tranceformations, inspired by the art of the San people, was first staged in 1991.

During the apartheid period, Glasser used dance to demonstrate opposition to the regime's oppression of black South African culture. From its founding, her company was the first in the country to racially integrate, which was still illegal at the time. She also emphasized the power of education through dance, which she dubbed "Educdance."

In 1996, Glasser was given an FNB Vita Special Achievement Award for her work as a choreographer and dance educator. In 2000, she was named a National Living Human Treasure and Foremost Pioneer of South Africa. She was also given a Lifetime Achievement Award from the Tunkie Arts and Culture Trust in 2005. She holds both a Dutch knighthood (2014) and the Order of Ikhamanga Silver from South Africa (2016).

Since her retirement in 2013, Glasser has published a book, Contemporary Dance and Southern African Rock Art: Tranceformations and Transformations.
