= Eddie Roux =

South African botanist and anti-apartheid activist

Eddie Roux OIS
- Born: Edward Roux; April 24, 1903; Transvaal Colony
- Died: March 2, 1966 (aged 62); Johannesburg, South Africa
- Education: PhD
- Alma mater: Downing College, University of Cambridge
- Occupation: Botanist
- Years active: 1929 - 1964
- Spouse: Winifred Lunt
- Father: Phillip Roux

Eddie Roux (24 April 1903 – 2 March 1966) was a Transvaal Colony-born botanist, academic, writer, member of the South African Communist Party and anti-apartheid activist.

== Early life ==
He was born Edward Roux to Afrikaner father Phillip R. Roux, a pharmacist and botanist, who was involved in the Labour Party and English mother, Edith May Wilson. He grew up in Bezuidenhout Valley, Johannesburg. Roux's political view were further inspired by the events of the 1917 Russian Revolution. After matriculating at Jeppe High School, he enrolled at the University of Witwatersrand and studied botany and zoology. At university, he joined in demonstrations against Jan Smuts' policies and met Sidney Bunting, later a leading member of the new South African Communist Party. In 1925, he would obtain an honour's degree in biology and a scholarship to Cambridge University. From 1926, he was studying at Downing College, Cambridge. He completed his PhD at Cambridge in 1929 and then returned to South Africa. After failing to obtain a position at the University of Fort Hare mainly due to his non-religious views, his old lecturer Charles Moss helped him obtain a research position at the Department of Agriculture's, Low Temperature Research Laboratory in Cape Town. He was dismissed from that position in 1929 after joining demonstrations conducted by the African National Congress (ANC).

== Political life ==
At the University of Witwatersrand, he would be an early member of the South African Communist Party (SACP). Roux, in 1924, as a member of the Communist Youth League, would support Buttings' effort to move the SACP towards recruiting black workers. His political views were further moulded by the events of the 1922 Rand Rebellion. At Cambridge University his view were moulded by Frederick Frost Blackman a left-wing lecturer and the latter National Union of Scientific Workers and he also joined the communist Labour Club and debated at the Heretics group. While in Europe, he attended the Sixth Congress of Communist International in 1928 in Moscow with Bunting and his wife. In 1929, he met Lancelot Hogben a biology professor at the University of Cape Town, a supporter of communism and who held meetings at his home with black activists. In 1930, he returned to Johannesburg and became part of the SACP's leadership and editor of its weekly paper Umsebnzi. Following Stalinist purging of the SACP during the New Line and its movement away from the black liberation struggle, he was expelled in 1936 because of his support for League of South African Rights and the Black Republic which were contrary to a Stalinist centralised approach to the movement. Without a job at the SACP nor the prospect of an academic career, he became a municipal pool cleaner.

== Later academic career ==
Through Izak Donen at the University of Cape Town, he obtained a research position in 1937 which led to, with another colleague, the discovery of higher levels of Vitamin A in certain South African fish livers. His colleague would form a private company to monetise the new research and would fund Roux's research. He would write several books, including a dictionary of socialist terms translated into African languages, a biography of Sidney Bunting and several articles and academic textbooks concerning biology. In order to improved language skills amongst Black people, he published a book in 1938 called Easy English for Africans. In 1948, he joined the University of the Witwatersrand's Frakenwald Research Station at the invitation of John Phillips and researched vitamins, potatoes, antibiotics, herbicides and grassland ecology. In 1962, he was granted a professorship at the university.

== Later politics ==
With the National Party winning control of the South African government after the 1948 election, they began to introduce Apartheid laws. Due to the Suppression of Communism Act of 1950, when Roux applied for a passport to travel Africa in 1959, it was rejected due to his past sympathies. From 1957 until 1962, Roux was a member of the Liberal Party. He joined because the party's membership was open to all races. Roux was eventually subjected to a banning order by Justice Minister John Vorster on 15 December 1964, preventing him from teaching or entering a university and it also included his academic books and articles, after he refused to name communist members of SACP even though he had not been a member since 1936. Students, as well as local and international academics, would protest against Roux's banning order.

== Marriage ==
He would marry Winifred Mary Lunt whom he had met through Lancelot Hogben.

== Death ==
He died suddenly in March 1966.

== Honours ==
Roux was awarded a posthumous Order of Ikhamanga, silver class, by the South African government in 2007.

== Publications ==
- S.P. Bunting (1944)
- Harvest and Health in Africa
- The Veld and the Future
- Time Longer than Rope: A History of the Black Man's Struggle for Freedom in South Africa (1948)
- Botany for Medical Students
- A First Year Plant Physiology
- Rebel Pity: The Life of Eddie Roux (1970)
- Grass: The Story of Frakenwald
