= Mowille =

Afro-fusion singer

- Born: Adedamola Durodola
- Occupation: Musician
- Years active: 2014–present

Adedamola Durodola, better known as Mowille, is an Afro-fusion singer and song-writer based in the United Kingdom.

Mowille formally started his career in 2015 and is currently working as an independent artist.

== Career ==
In 2014, he released Pass Out along with DSkillz as a musical video.

In 2020, he released another new song, Get Up Now.

In 2021, he released a new song Dinner along with Damola Davis. In August 2021, he released Ride N Roll.

== Discography ==
- Afro Fiesta (2013)
- Moti Thirty (2017)
- Emi Ekun (2019)
- ODUSTY (2020)
- Get Up Now (2020)
- Dinner (2021)
- Ride N Roll (2021)
