= Afro fusion =

Dance genre and musical style

- Other names: Afrofusion; afro-fusion
- Stylistic origins: South African traditional music; traditional African music; world music; worldbeat; crossover music; afropop; experimental music
- Cultural origins: 1970s–1980s, South Africa
- Typical instruments: mbira; violin; saxophone; harmonica; drums; steel-string acoustic guitar; singing; keyboard

Other topics
- Afro; afro house; afro tech; afro rock; alté; amapiano; gqom; jaiva; jazz fusion; marabi; maskandi; motswako; shangaan electro; tsapiky

Afro fusion (also spelled afrofusion or afro-fusion) is a dance and musical style that emerged between the 1970s and 2000s. (Note: Cited to multiple sources:) In the same way as the dance style, the musical style invokes fusions of various regional and inter-continental musical cultures, such as jazz, hip hop, kwaito, reggae, soul, pop, kwela, blues, folk, rock and afrobeat. (Note: Cited to multiple sources:)

== Term and widespread usage ==
Vincent Mantsoe and Sylvia Glasser are the pioneering figures behind "Afrofusion," a contemporary African movement vocabulary and technique that emerged in response to the political changes following the near-end and end of the apartheid regime, a system of racial segregation that took place in South Africa from 1948 to 1991.

After the musical style was globally popularized by Freshlyground and Shakira's Waka Waka (This Time for Africa), which showcased afrofusion and soca, the term "afro fusion" was increasingly used as a hypernym to refer to both historical and as present-day examples of African music blended with other genres, for instance, Western music. Some instances include, in 2015, John Collins described the musical style as "Afro-Fusion music of Africa itself" in his biography and music criticism book Fela: Kalakuta Notes. American rapper GoldLink's 2019 album, Diaspora, merged African, Caribbean and North American music, inclusive of a song titled, "Zulu Screams". "Zulu Screams" demonstrated Bibi Bourelly, a German singer-songwriter of Haitian and Moroccan descent, singing in Lingala alongside British-Nigerian musical artist Maleek Berry, who was described as an "afro-fusionist" by Pitchfork.

== Dance style ==
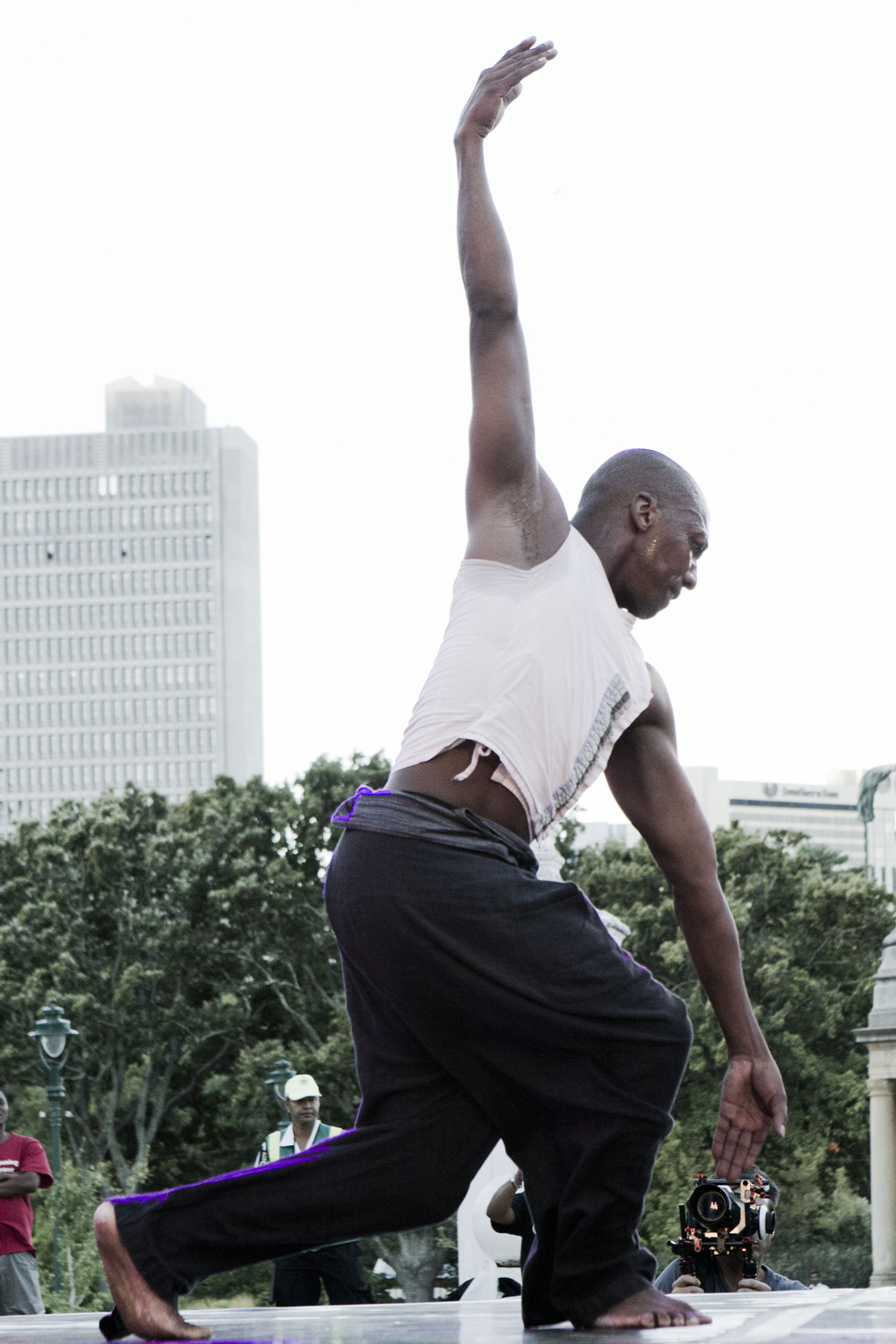
(Pictured) Vincent Mantsoe performing at Infecting The City (ITC) festival, in 2012

Afro fusion as a dance style was pioneered by South African dancer-choreographer Sylvia Glasser (Magogo) between the

1970s and 2000s. Glasser established The Sylvia Glasser Contemporary Dance Group in 1971. In 1978 Glasser co-founded an additional contemporary dance company, Moving into Dance, also known as "Moving into Dance Mophatong wa Thabo (MiD)" alongside Maria Kint.

Having established arguably South Africa's most important contemporary dance company in 1978 from the garage at her home in Victory Park – long before it was fashionable or even legal to host black and white dancers on the same stage – Glasser unequivocally changed the nature of dance in South Africa.

— Robyn Sassen, "Sylvia Glasser dances to her own drum", Mail & Guardian, 10 December 2015

Sylvia Glasser's protégés include international contemporary dance household names inclusive of Gregory Maqoma and Vincent Mantsoe. Mantsoe was a part of the participants in the earliest groups that performed Glasser's historic "San trance" dancing work, Transformations. In the 1970s, afro fusion garnered mainstream popularity in African countries such as Zambia and Namibia. Somatic techniques such as release and Alexander Technique were developed and commixed with African dance styles like kwassa kwassa and pantsula resulting in the hybrid dance style.

Glasser pioneered what has come to be called Afrofusion, bringing together African dance and Western dance. She pursued this vision from the company's very beginnings in 1978. Through her work and that of the company's young choreographers and dancers, the Afrofusion idiom now pervades South African dance.

— Staff Reporter, "In a dance state", Mail & Guardian, 16 October 1998

== Musical style ==
As a genre and musical compositional form, Afro fusion incorporates traditional African music, alternative music as well as Afropop, blending various genres in an experimental crossover-like style. Afrofusion songs often include vocals in a range of African languages alongside other languages such as Spanish, English and French. For example, English, isiXhosa, Duala and Spanish in the multilingual song "Waka Waka".

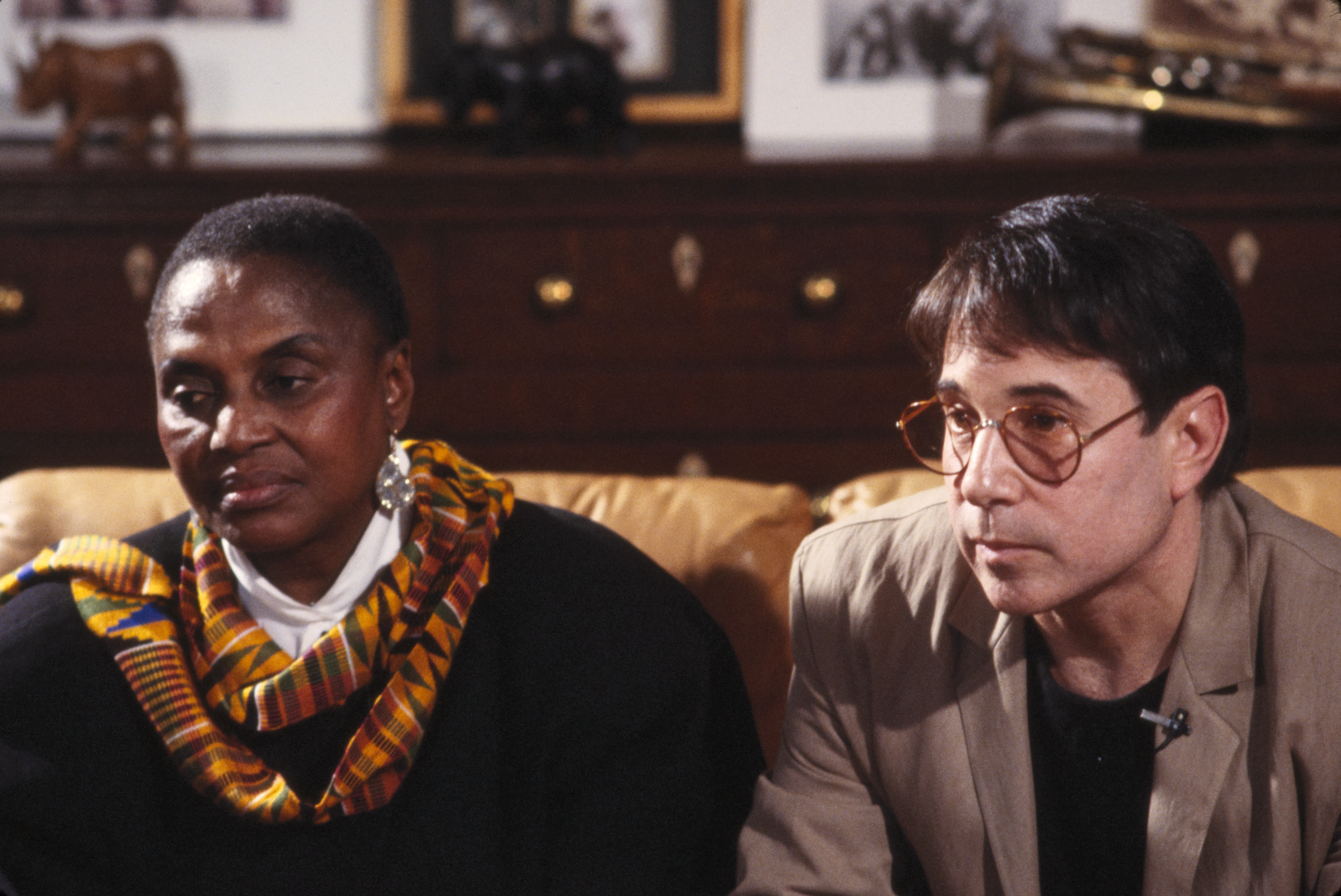
South African activist and singer, Miriam Makeba and American singer- songwriter Paul Simon.

The musical style's roots as well as music scenes can be traced as far back as before the 21st century. An early example was Stimela, a South African band formed in the 1970s by Ray Phiri. Phiri featured on Paul Simon's worldbeat Graceland album as a guitarist. Ray Phiri was renowned for fusing mbaqanga and jazz. Mbaqanga originated in South Africa in the early 1960s. The genre itself is a fusion of traditional Zulu music, jazz, European and American popular music. A significant portion of South African music in the 1950s originated from the intersection of American jazz, African American choral traditions and indigenous African folk music. The Manhattan Brothers were a widely acclaimed South African singing ensemble inclusive of Miriam Makeba between the 1940s and 1950s. The musical ensemble's musical style encompassed influences from American ragtime, jive, swing, doo-wop and various other jazz genres, along with African choral traditions and Zulu harmonies. Marabi evolved from makwaya which merged European hymnology with spirituals as well as close and open harmony between the 1890s to 1920s onwards, it incorporated a variety of elements such as jazz, ragtime, Pedi and Tswana bass music as well as keyboard adaptations of Xhosa folk melodies.

...Hugh Masekela on trumpet; Jonas Gwangwa on trombone;Kippie Moeketsi on saxophone, as well as Dolly Rathebe and Miriam Makeba's vocal prowess they ushered in an era of a new afro fusion sound...

— Max Mojapelo, "Chapter Fourteen – Joy or Jazz", Beyond Memory Recording the History, Moments and Memories of South African Music, 2008

Hugh Masekela's career was characterized by his experiments with jazz and diverse ethnic African music within a pop framework. Miriam Makeba, renowned for chart-topping tracks such as "Pata Pata" and "The Click Song" distinguished herself through an innovative blend of jazz, traditional African music, traditional South African music and Western popular music, incorporating her native Xhosa language.

== History ==
=== 1970s–1980s ===
During the peak of apartheid in the 1970s and 1980s, many South African artists went into exile, which complicated documentation of their careers during that period.

Primarily, protest musicians were united in a clear and simple mission— to end apartheid. They acknowledged the existence of influential voices across time, each initiating a seminal wave of protest with a suitable, alternative genre or style. Starting from within the camp of the defranchised (whether "exiles" like Miriam Makeba and Hugh Masekela or "inziles" like Dolly Rathebe and the bands Sakhile and Bayete) these dissenting voices were joined by troubadours and folk musicians of the more progressive elite, such as the Lindberg-duo, Jeremy Taylor, and later, the highly-censored Roger Lucey.

— Jonathan C. Friedman, "The Routledge History of Social Protest in Popular Music", 2013

Sylvia Glasser's afrofusion arose from the combination of African music and ritual and incorporating Western contemporary dance forms into her choreography. Glasser initiated the company, Moving into Dance Mopha-tong during a period of heightened racial oppression and segregation. As an anthropologist, she was motivated to create contemporary dance rooted in an African context. Her vision of afrofusion, which additionally incorporated a modified Graham technique, became a cornerstone training method for South African dancers for many years. When Vincent Mantsoe assumed artistic leadership of MIDM, his exploration of Eastern dance forms and mysticism influenced a shift in technique and training. The company underwent further transformation when Gregory Maqoma took the helm, introducing his vision of post-modern African dance and steering the company in a new direction.

Stimela originated from the soul group, The Cannibals, established by Ray Phiri during the 1970s. Phiri, best known for his contributions on Paul Simon's albums Graceland and The Rhythm of the Saints. Having garnered a series of successful singles in South Africa, the band achieved notable success. In the early 1980s, Phiri collaborated with former members of The Cannibals to establish Stimela, an afro-fusion ensemble (meaning "steam train"). Stimela fuses R&B and jazz with rhythmic elements of South African genres such as mbaqanga. Phiri led the band, taking on roles as guitarist, songwriter and often lead vocalist. Phiri sang in English and various other South African languages additionally the band recorded songs in the Malawian language, Chichewa, during a period when the apartheid regime, the recording industry and the South African Broadcasting Corporation were advocating for a policy of "retribalization", which promoted the idea that black music should be exclusively sung in one African language. Joy White served as the initial vocalist for Stimela. During the 1980s and early 1990s, Stimela's music occasionally confronted the boundaries of expression permissible under apartheid. Certain songs faced bans from airing on the state-controlled radio station, SABC, particularly "Whispers in the Deep" advocating for fearless expression, "Speak your mind. Don't be afraid." Additionally, a 1984, duet inclusive of a white singer, Katie Pennington, "Where Did We Go Wrong" faced rejection from radio stations for airplay. Despite radio restrictions, the band's 1986 album featuring the song, titled "Look, Listen and Decide" achieved significant commercial success, becoming a bestseller. Stimela's albums achieved gold and platinum status. The debut of Stimela occurred at a perfectly opportune moment, stepping in to fill the gap left by afrofusion band, Sakhile's (comprising Sipho Gumede, Khaya Mahlangu and Don Laka) sabbatical. Sankomota (previously named 'Uhuru') was an afrofusion band formed in the 1970s in Lesotho. They served as the resident band at Maseru's Victoria Hotel, entertaining notable figures like Miriam Makeba and Hugh Masekela, who were in exile from South Africa due to their political views. Their breakthrough came in 1983 when South African producer Lloyd Ross from Shifty Records recorded their debut album, Sankomota and Frank Leepa's hit composition "It's Raining" was released. Subsequent albums were released under labels such as Gallo Record Company, and the band relocated to South Africa. Tsepo Tshola toured Southern Africa with Hugh Masekela and later traveled to London, where the rest of Sankomota joined him in 1985. Bassist Bakithi Khumalo and his cousin, drummer Vusi Khumalo, supplied rhythms for country and Western bands. The Khumalos then formed the band Theta (meaning "talk"). Another South African fusion band, Tananas, comprising Ian Herman, Steve Newman and Gito Baloi was formed in 1987. Baloi sang in Portuguese and Tsonga. Their music melded elements of jazz, country, Congolese rumba, rock, township jazz, ragtime, township jive, Mozambican salsa and Spanish Music. Tananas recorded with Gallo and Sony. Peace released their debut record and performed alongside Dollar Brand (Abdullah Ibrahim) and Hugh Masekela. Collective, Night Cruiser performed in Zakes Mda's plays at the Space Theatre.

=== 1990s ===
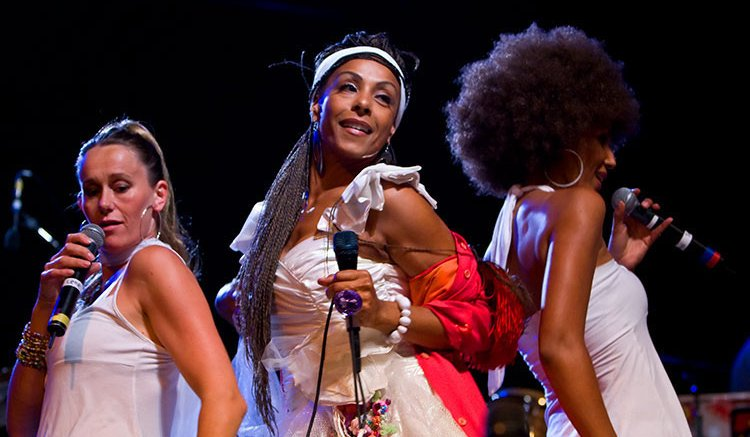
Zap Mama performing in Seattle at Bumbershoot in 2007

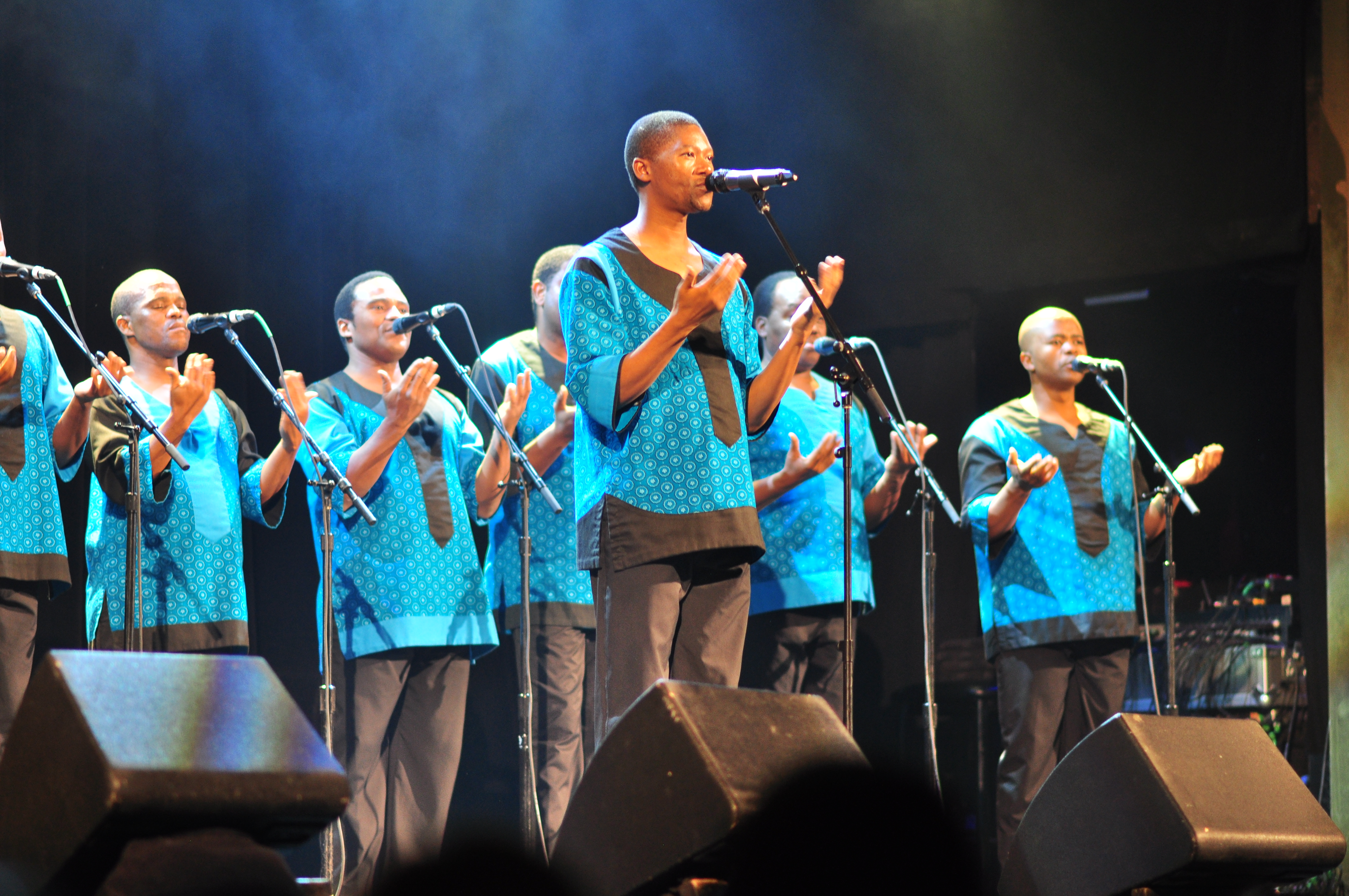
Ladysmith Black Mambazo performing at the Neptune Theater

In 1991, Zap Mama released their debut album Adventures in Afropea 1. The polyphonic group comprised founder and leader Marie Daulne along with Sabine Kabongo, Sylvie Nawasadio, Cecilia Kankoda and Celine Thooft. They were influenced by their diverse European and African heritages in addition the cosmopolitan ambience of Brussels, their hometown. They crafted an a capella repertoire blending elements from Congolese pop and Arabic melodies as well as various other influences. During Daulne's time in America she fused soul, jazz, hip hop, reggae and Latin music among other genres. Daulne collaborated with a range of artists such as South African male a capella ensemble Ladysmith Black Mambazo, Americans actor and rapper Common and Michael Franti.

As Nelson Mandela's release from prison and the end of minority-dominated white governance approached, Tsepo Tshola returned to South Africa from London and teamed up with Hugh Masekela for his homecoming Sekunjalo tour of South Africa in 1991.

In 1993, Tsepo Tshola released his debut solo album, The Village Pope a moniker that resonated well with fans and has remained associated with the songster ever since.

Grace Mpori Senne, together with her daughter Sandra Pheto established an all-women band named African Maroon. Senne was as an actor, author, director, dancer, researcher, percussionist and expert instructor with a focus on Southern African dance styles, namely gumboot dance. African Maroon showcased a diverse afro-fusion repertoire spanning jazz, mbaqanga and blues. While residing in Soweto in the 1960s, Senne was an engaged member of the African National Congress. Grace Senne's apprentices at the Community Dance Teachers Training Course (CDTTC) included Vincent Mantsoe and Gregory Maqoma. Sylvia Glasser described Senne as "a living storehouse of knowledge of traditional African dance".

In 1994, Tananas released Orchestra Mundo which earned them the Best Jazz Performance award at the inaugural, South African Music Awards.

In 1997, Maqoma had earned a scholarship to attend a choreographic workshop at DanceWeb in Vienna, an experience that broadened his horizons. Choreographer Emio Greco had urged him to "push more, go for more," and had introduced him to improvisation.

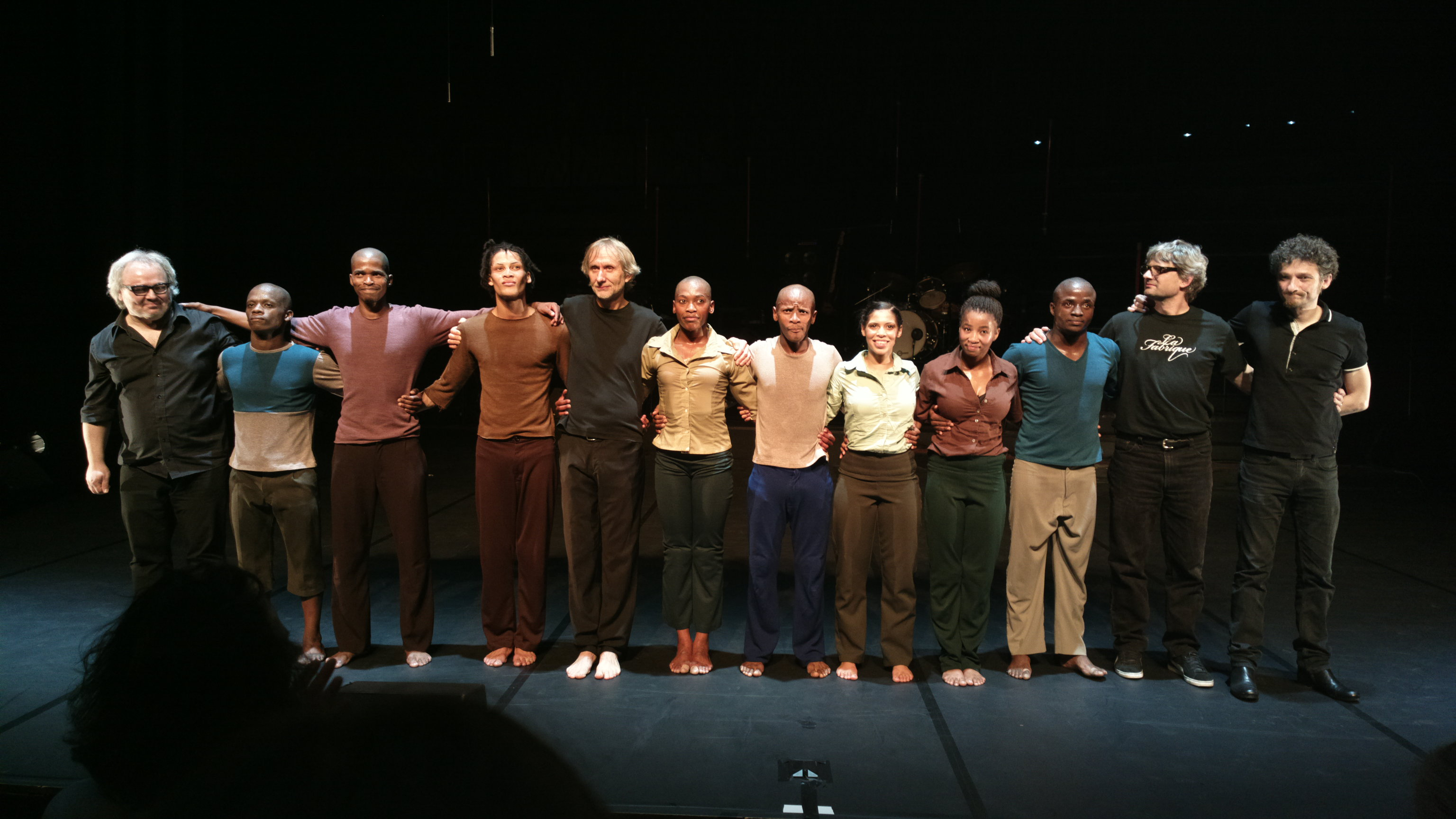
Gregory Maqoma, along with the Vuyani Dance Theater, collaborated with the Erik Truffaz Quartet, comprising Marcello Giuliani, Marc Erbetta, and Benoît Corboz, for a music and dance production hosted at the Musée du Quai Branly.

In 1999, Greg Maqoma established The Vuyani Dance Theatre. The Vuyani Dance Theatre derives its name from Maqoma's Xhosa name, "Vuyani," which in English translates to "joy".

Some arrive with just a suitcase. Then in three months they're on a flight to France to perform. We can do six productions in a month. They have to keep up the pace. We don't choose dancers. Dancers choose themselves.

— Greg Maqoma, "Dance: Dancing with the dead", TimesLIVE, 2014

=== 2000s–2010s ===
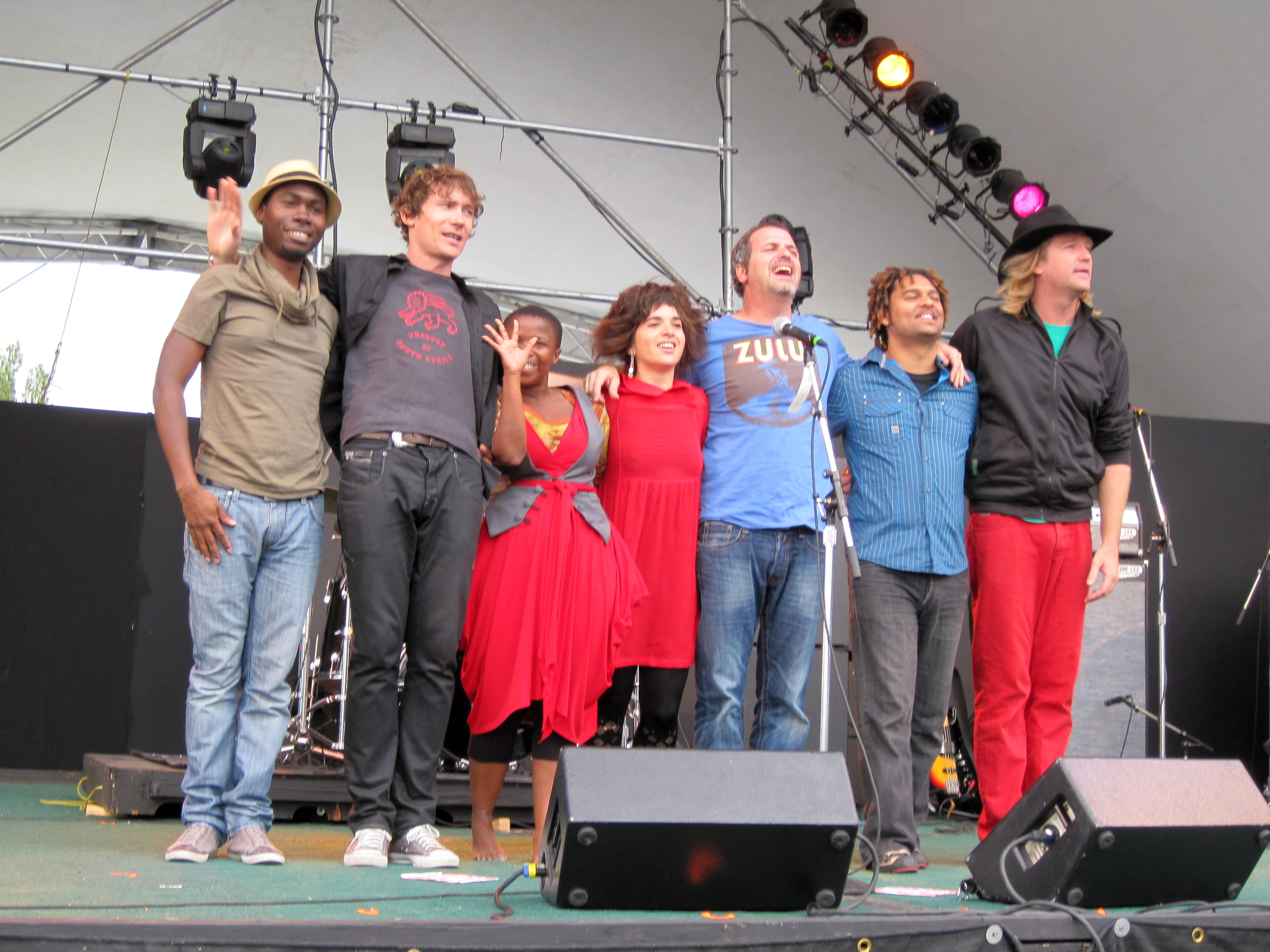
Afrofusion band, Freshlyground pictured in Cape Town.

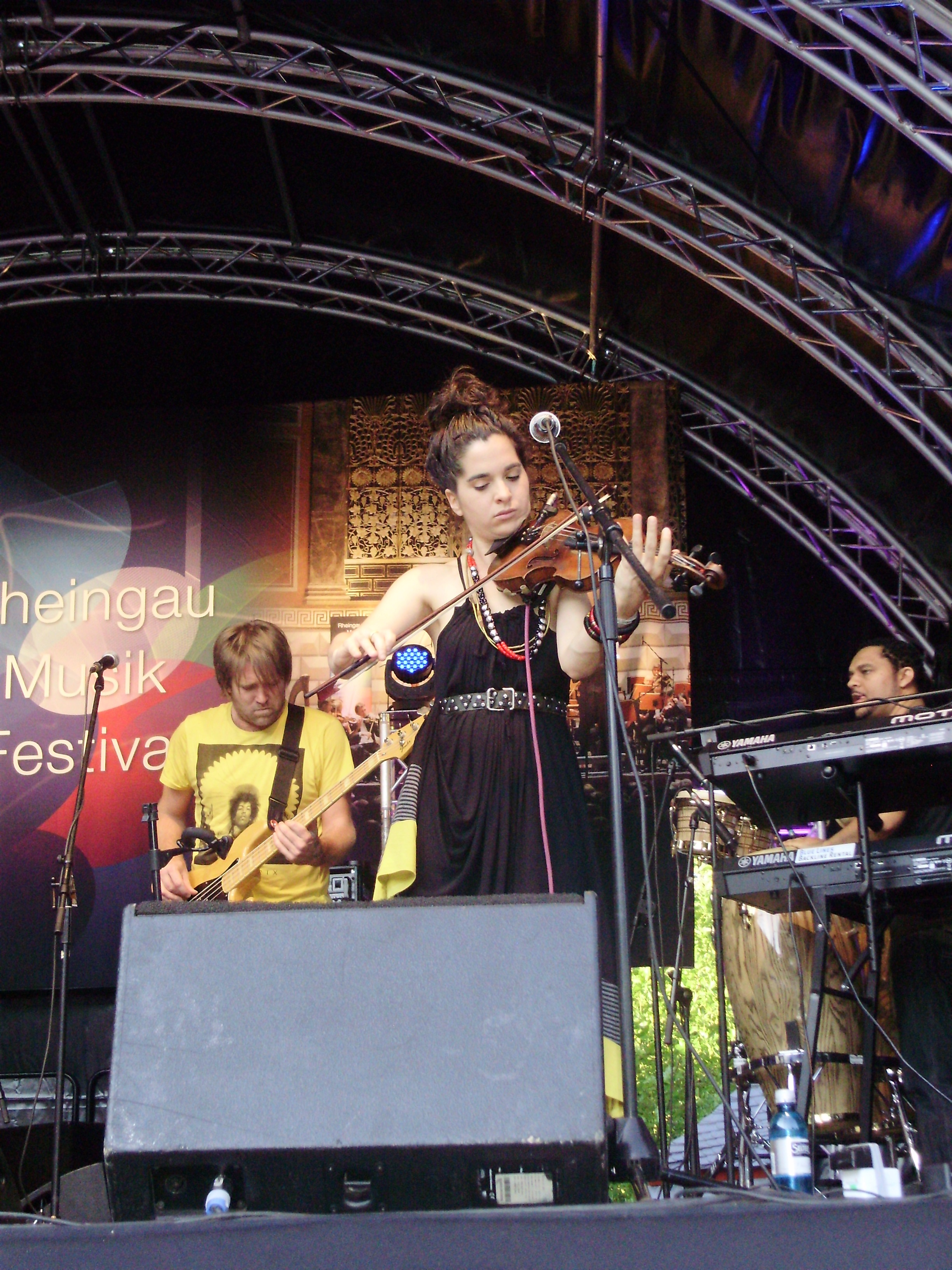
(Pictured) Kyla-Rose Smith at the Rheingau Music Festival in 2012

Freshlyground was formed in 2002, with its members citing diverse ethnic and multi-national backgrounds, which played a role in the popularization of the afro-fusion musical style as each band member would supply culturally as well as traditionally indigenous, distinctive musical elements for the band's musical compositional forms as well as performances.The band fused traditional South African music as well as afropop genres such as kwela with jazz, indie-rock and blues. Violinist and backing vocalist Kyla-Rose Smith was previously a part of and affiliated to Maqoma's dance company, The Vuyani Dance Theatre. Smith performed at the Centre National de la Danse in Paris as well as co-wrote the music and served as the principal violinist for performances. At the age of 15, Simon Attwell was playing the flute in the Zimbabwe National Orchestra. By 17, Attwell had earned a scholarship to the Chethams School of Music in Manchester. Aron Turest-Swartz had studied piano under Merton Barrow at the Jazz Workshop in Cape Town as a teenager. In 1998, he commenced playing drums and percussion in Dublin. The band's songs are multilingual performed in languages such as Xhosa, English, French and Zulu.

In 2003, East African talent yearly awards ceremony the Kisima Music Awards founded in 1994, was revivified inclusive of an afro fusion, category. Alliance Française de Nairobi is thought to be most notable in regards to solidifying afro fusion, in Kenya.

The Alliance leadership viewed supporting Afro fusion as part of their institution's mission to promote 'artistic and cultural diversity'

— Georgina Born, "Developing Afro-fusion", Music and Digital Media A planetary anthropology

In 2004, afro-soul singer, Zamajobe released her debut album Ndawo Yami which was a fusion of jazz, traditional African music, pop and folk. Zamajobe received the Best Newcomer Award at the 2005 South African Music Awards, along with a nomination for the inaugural Best African Act category at the 2005 MTV Europe Music Awards.

In 2005, Vincent Mantsoe established his dance company, Association Noa in France.

In 2006, Freshlyground was awarded the MTV Europe Music Award for Best African Act, a recognition thought to stem from the success of singles like "Doo Be Doo" and "I'd Like" from their second album, Nomvula, which had achieved double-platinum sales. The show was broadcast live in 179 countries, reaching a potential 1.4 billion viewers. It was the first time it had been transmitted simultaneously to third-generation cellphones in nine European countries, accessible to approximately 20 million subscribers, as reported by MTV Networks International.

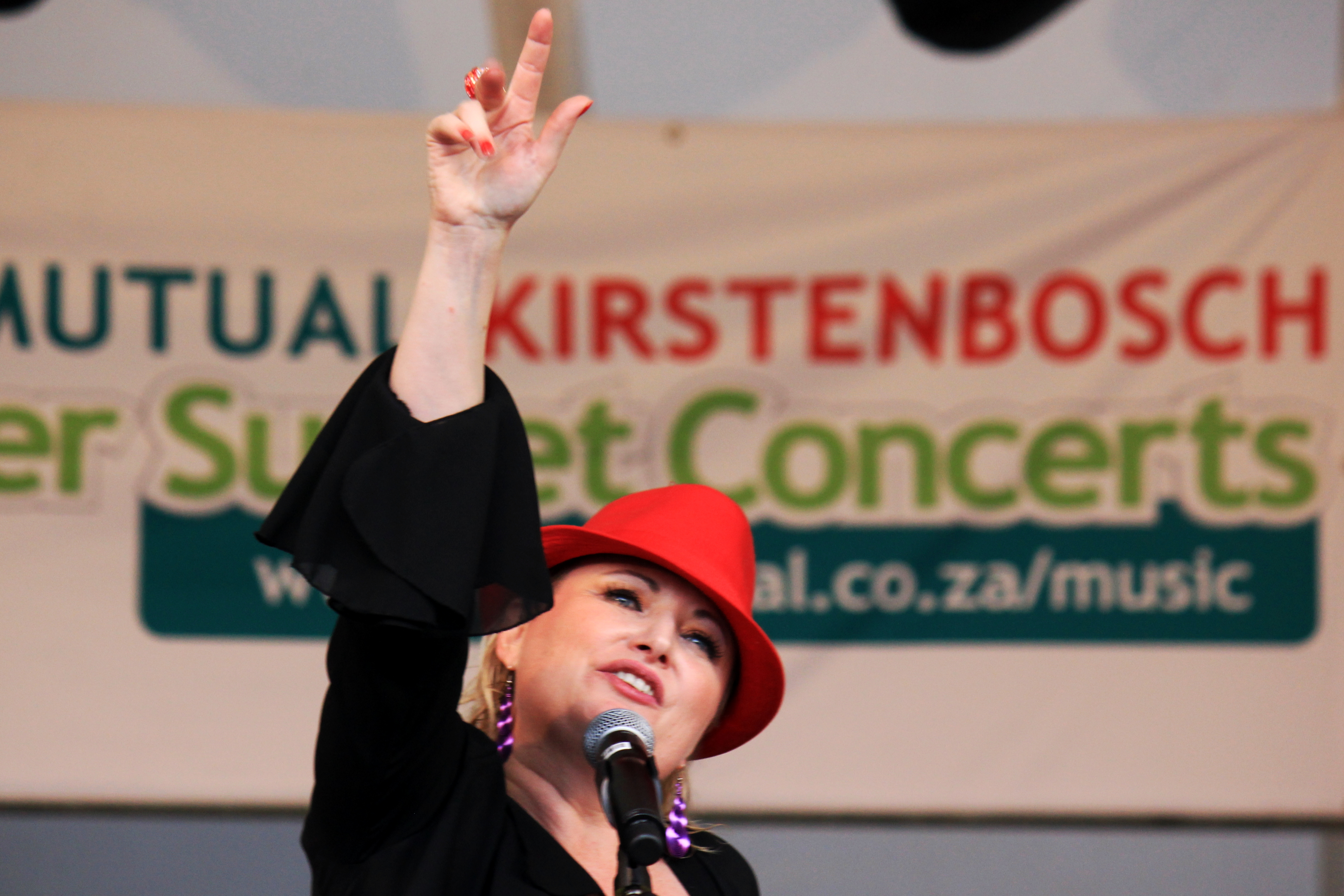
Claire Johnston, lead singer of Mango Groove pictured performing in 2012

In 2008, Botswana newspaper Mmegi's writer Tshireletso Motlogelwa wrote a think-piece regarding resemblances between fusion band Freshlyground and the acts that came before them, namely predecessors Mango Groove. Mango Groove is a South African, African popular music ensemble comprising 11 members inclusive of British descent South African Claire Johnston, formed in 1984. The band fuses pop with township music genres like marabi. Freshlyground welcomed their former drummer Peter Cohen into the band in 2002.

In 2009, Zap Mama released their album ReCreations. Their collaborators spanned a diverse spectrum, ranging from French actor Vincent Cassel, neo-soul singer Bilal and rock-blues singer-guitarist G.Love.

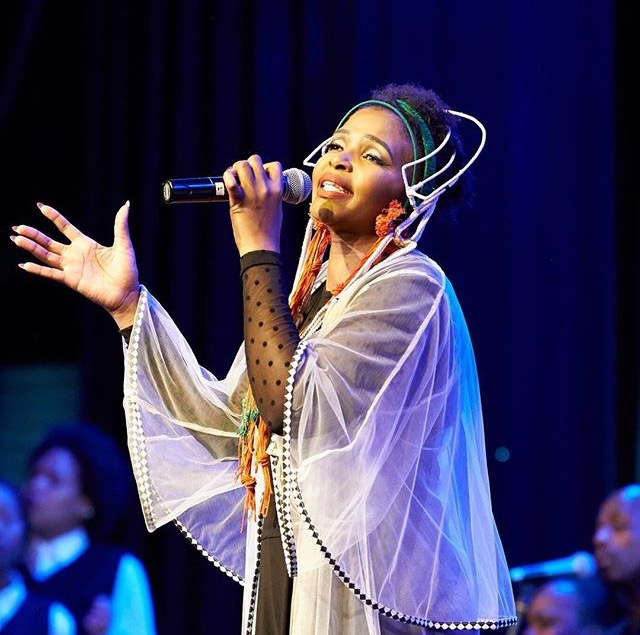
Simphiwe Dana, during a live performance.

In 2010, Freshlyground alongside "The Queen of Latin Music", Colombian singer Shakira released the multilingual afro fusion and soca 2010 FIFA World Cup signature-tune "Waka Waka (This Time for Africa)". The fusion song is considered as one of the best selling-singles of all time and obtained number 1 status, in 15 countries. The music video garnered over 4 billion views on YouTube, succeeding in it being one of the platform's most viewed videos.

Simphiwe Dana released her Kulture Noir album, which incorporated elements of afro-juju jazz guitarism by Kunle Ayo, harmonica played by Adam Glasser, Gordon Williams' funk afro-fusion reinterpretation of Miriam Makeba's music, ululation, maskandi-jazz, and a cappella.

In 2011, Stimela's A Lifetime, album released in 2010, received the award for Best Adult Contemporary Album at the South African Music Awards.

Themba Mkhize, (former member of afrofusion bands Bayete and Sakhile) served as the musical director for the stage play Kwela Bafana+. The production is set in the 1950s and highlights the "Sophiatown era".

Between the 2010s and 2020s the musical style developed further into having doubly local and regional scenes as more musicians started to experiment with afrofusion.

In 2012, Japanese musician Sakaki Mango fused Japanese vocals and the mbira, known as deza in South Africa, limba in Tanzania, timbili in Cameroon and likembe in Congo.

Afrofusion dancer Luyanda Sidiya choreographed Umnikelo, featured in the double bill Mayhem, and it won the Silver Standard Bank Ovation Award at the National Arts Festival in Grahamstown that year. Umnikelo incorporated Xhosa traditional lyricism. Sidiya conducted Afro-fusion dance workshops abroad and spent three years in the United Kingdom, initially as a dancer with the ACE Dance and Music Company before assuming the role of rehearsal director.

In 2013, Nigerian afrofusion and soul singer Villy (Oliseh John Odili) and his band the Xtreme Volumes blended afrobeat, soul and highlife among other genres.

In 2014, Luyanda Sidiya presented his afro-fusion piece Umnikelo at Vuyani Dance Theatre's, US premiere during the Fall for Dance Festival in New York. The performance garnered positive recognition, including a favorable mention in the New York Times.

Sylvia Glasser and Maria Kint received recognition from former Netherlands to South Africa ambassador André Haspels of His Majesty, King Willem-Alexander of The Netherlands. Glasser and Kint were honored with knighthoods for their individual efforts in advancing relations between South Africa and the Netherlands spanning the period from apartheid onwards. Sylvia Glasser and Maria Kint were bestowed with the Order of Oranje-Nassau for their contributions to democracy, cultural collaboration between South Africa and the Netherlands, education and the arts.

Bacardi house pioneer DJ Spoko, musical artist and afrofuturist Spoek Mathambo, guitarist Andre Geldenhuys, drummer Michael Buchanan and Bhekisenzo Cele formed the ensemble, Fantasma. Incorporating a wide range of influences Fantasma combined kwaito, traditional music, maskandi, Shangaan electro, hip hop, punk rock, electronica, psychedelic rock, Southern soul and various other genres.

Batuk, released their debut EP Musica da Terra (meaning ‘music of the earth’ in Portuguese). The collective was described as " a South African collective with a post-modern approach to spreading pan-Africanism" by Radio France Internationale. The trio comprises Aero Manyelo, Manteiga and Spoek Mathambo. Their songs delve into a diverse array of topics, spanning African pride, war, feminism, conservation and nature.The group's music bridges African culture and African languages alongside the drawing from and fusion of zouk, kuduro, afro house, deep house, tribal house, soul, techno and traditional African music. The EP included collaborations with Nandi Ndlovu, Grupo Zore and Grupo Makarita from Mozambique, Congolese musician Lebon alongside Giovanni Kiyingi, Annet Nandujja and Nilotica from Uganda.

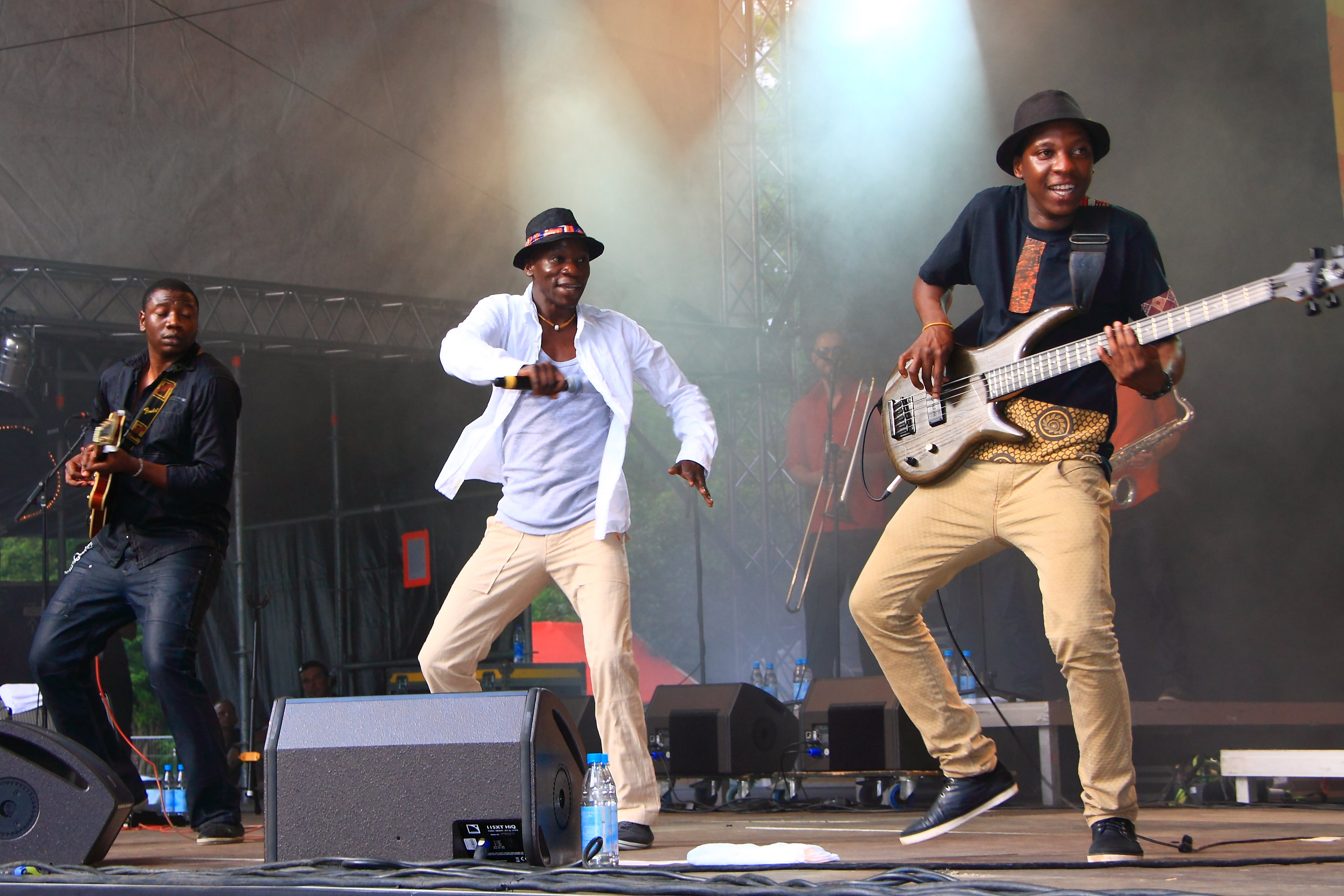
Musical group, Mokoomba performing at Rudolstadt-Festival, 2013

In 2017, Mokoomba made their debut on Mountain Stage which was recorded live at the Culture Center Theater in Charleston, West Virginia. Mokoomba was formed in 2002. Mokoomba comprises Mathias Muzaza on lead vocals, Trustworth Samende on lead guitar, Abundance Mutori on bass, Donald Moyo on keyboard, Miti Mugande on percussion and Ndaba Coster Moyo on drums.Mokoomba sings in Tongan and Luvale among other languages and fuses Tonga rhythms, soca, soukous, funk, ska, pop and other genres.

In 2018, Raymond Millagre Langa, a founding member of the Bulawayo-based afro-fusion band Ditswi, established a new band, the Ethnic Feeling.The group was established with the objective of advocating for cultural variety and acceptance, particularly by fusing traditional and contemporary instruments and linguistic diversity. Langa had stated, "Ethnic Feeling is more of a different feel, where I was experimenting with an acoustic feel and a fusion of traditional instruments like mbira. It is a solo project, I just orchestrated on the sidelines with a new and dynamic team. My aim was to experiment with the mbira sound on a Ndebele song and it worked well".

In 2019, The Pearl Rhythm Foundation hosted the 7th Pearl Rhythm Festival, hosted at the National Theatre of Uganda in Kampala, "to introduce and strengthen traditional and fusion music in Uganda".

Songstress Siphokazi, collaborated with and performed alongside songwriter-singer and humanitarian, Yvonne Chaka Chaka.

Following 17 years of touring the world, Zolani Mahola, the lead singer of Freshlyground, revealed her decision to embark on her solo career under the name "The One Who Sings". In an exclusive interview, the singer discussed her shift towards a new direction, where she planned to dedicate more time to public and motivational speaking while exploring a different musical path with her own compositions. Mahola expressed her intention to continue showcasing her ability to bridge social, racial and language divides through her music as she launched her solo career.

=== 2020s ===
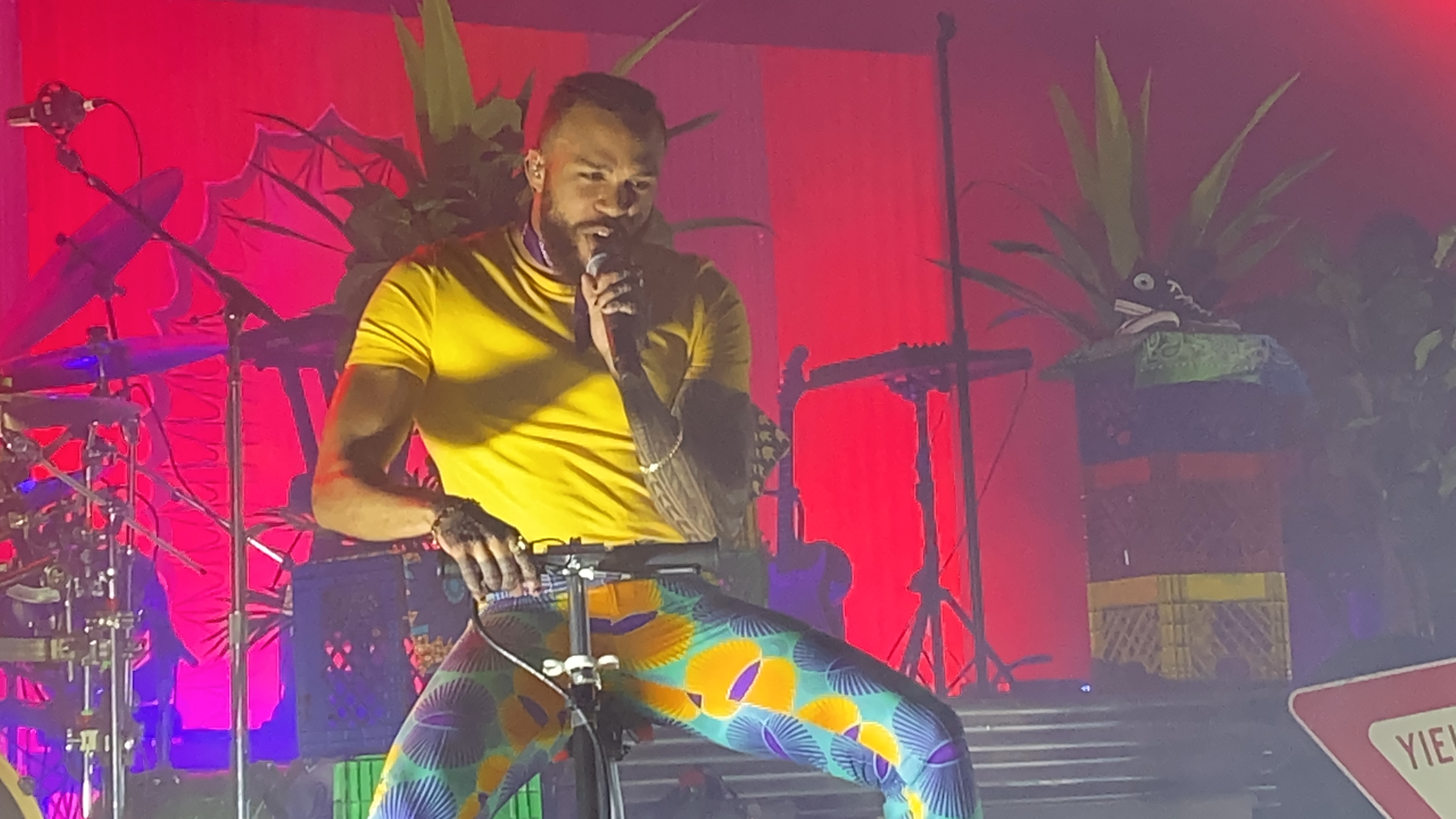
Rapper and songwriter Jidenna in 2019 during a performance for his 85 to Africa tour

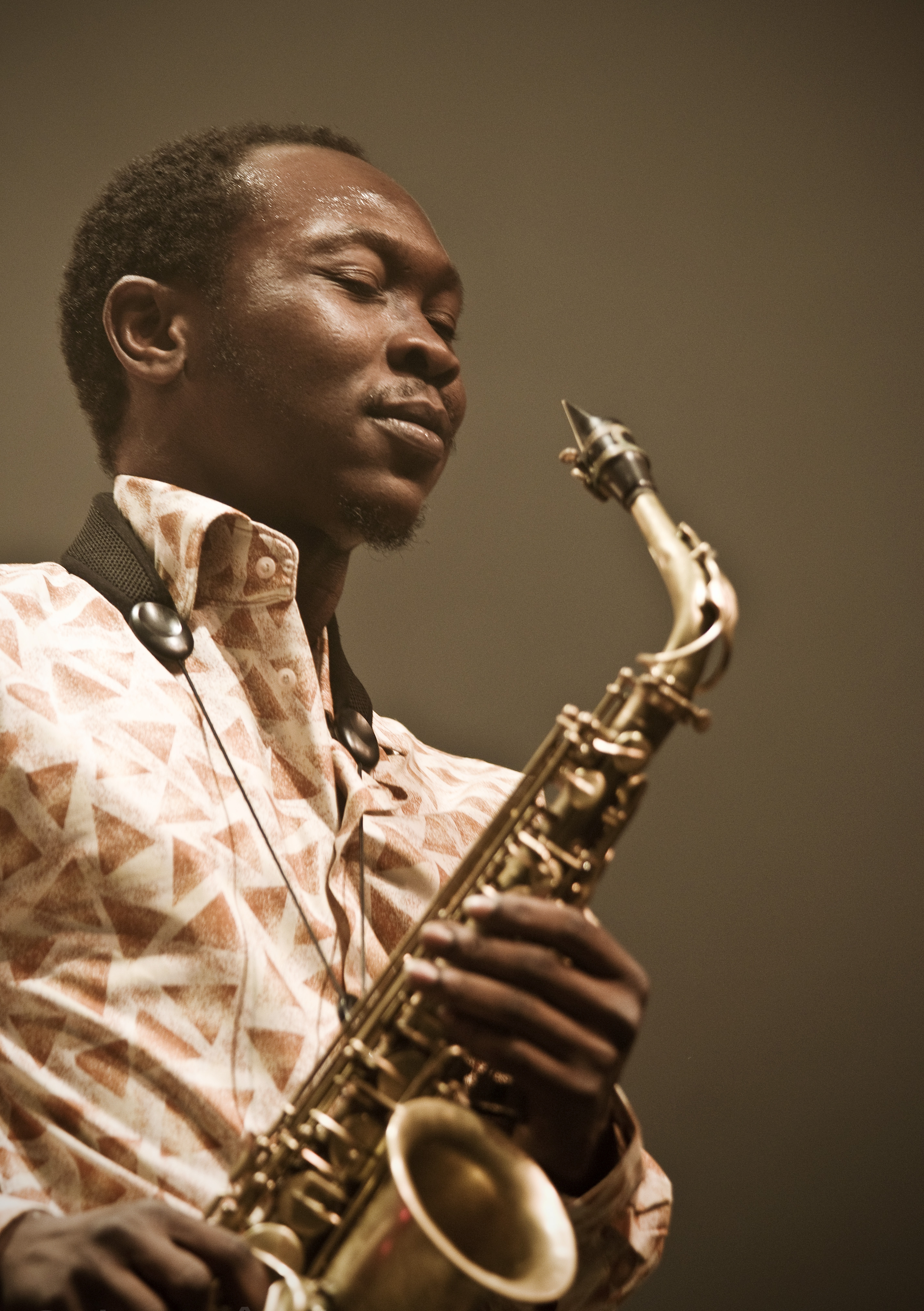
Afrobeat saxophonist and singer, Seun Kuti performing at Marsatac, 2008

In 2020, rapper and singer Jidenna's "Feng Shui" song which was featured in HBO's comedy-drama TV series, Insecure was described as an 808s-meets-afrofusion inclusive of a sped-up, highlife guitar sample. The song was from the singer's 85 to Africa album. The album included guest appearances by Seun Kuti, GoldLink, Mr Eazi, Ethiopian-American rapper Mereba and American musical ensemble St. Beauty. Jidenna travelled between two African countries, namely South Africa and Nigeria which the album was inspired by.

Zolani Mahola, performed alongside South African electronic duo Goldfish and Craig Lucas, who won the second season of The Voice South Africa. They performed at Project Playground's Safe Space fundraising gala. Swedish television presenter Renée Nyberg hosted the gala, which was streamed live in multiple countries.

Cape Verde singer Nelson Freitas and Central African record producer Boddhi Satva collaborated for the release "Goofy" from Freitas' kizomba and afro-fusion album, Sempre Verão. Kizomba, originating in Angola, is a dance and musical genre that surfaced in 1984.

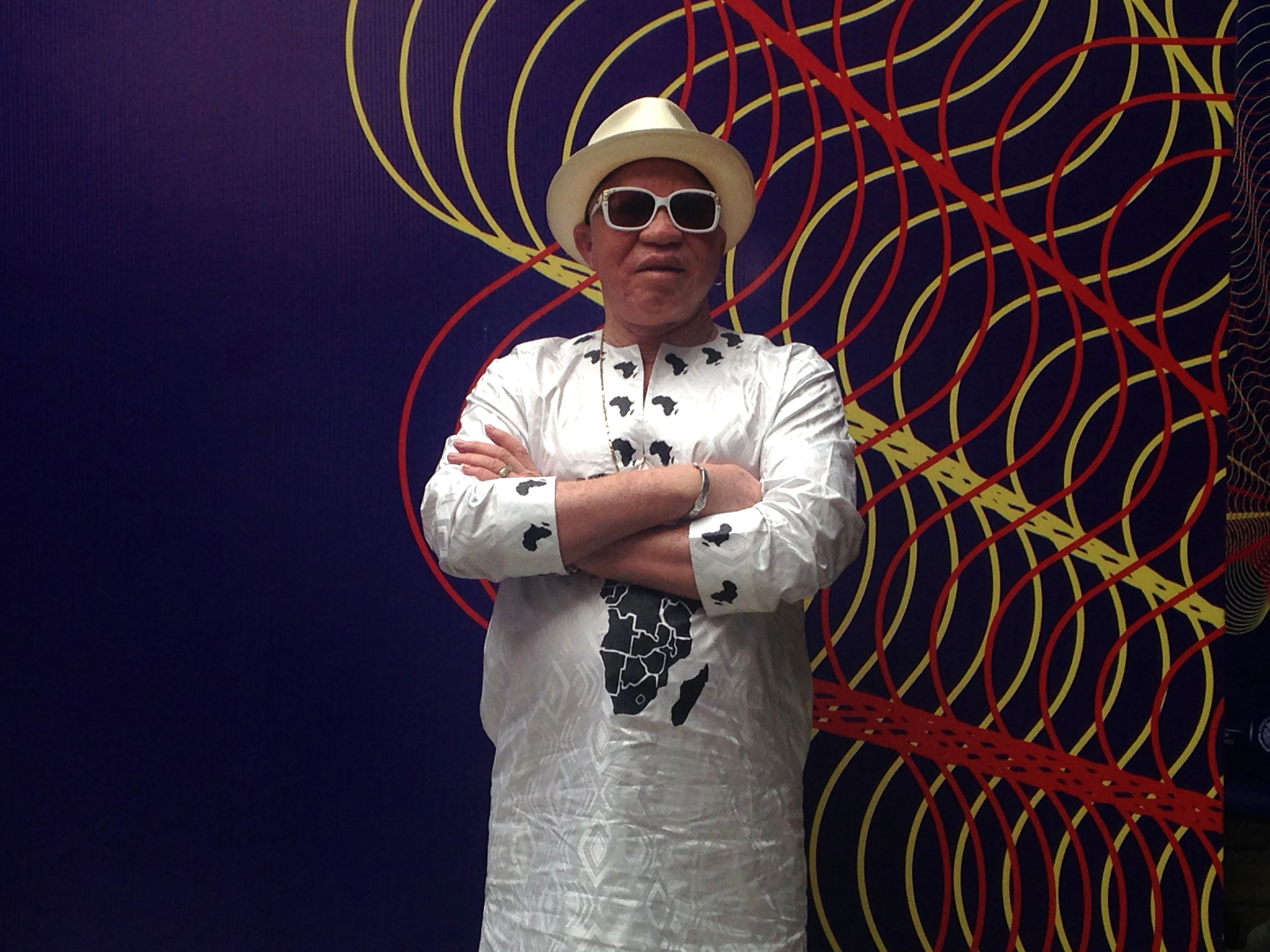
Songwriter-singer Salif Keita

Simphiwe Dana, released afrofusion album, Bamako which was co-produced by Malian songwriter-singer, descendant of the Keita dynasty and member Salif Keita. Two chord accompaniment was enriched by cross-rhythms, reminiscent of Dana's 2010 album, Kulture Noir.

In 2021, Mixmag named Magixx as "Nigeria's next big afro-fusion star". Magixx released his debut self-titled extended play, Magixx which incorporated blends of various afropop genres, dancehall and trap.

Choreographer and dancer, Gregory Maqoma performed at the Baxter Theatre in Cape Town, alongside former Freshlyground band member, Zolani Mahola.

Alliance Française organized a panel discussion titled "Music Business and How to Make Afro-Fusion Music Relevant and Consumable Within Tanzania and East Africa".

In 2022, Vincent Mantsoe was honored as the legacy artist for the 24th Jomba! a contemporary dance experience in Durban.The dance festival, organized by the Centre for Creative Arts at the University of KwaZulu-Natal returned to live programming after a two-year hiatus. In that year, Jomba! took place at the Elizabeth Sneddon Theatre, from August 30, 2022, to September 11, 2022.

In 2023, Grammy-winning Jamaican reggae band formed in 1994, Morgan Heritage's The Homeland album "was positioned as a beautiful fusion of African and Jamaican sounds." Morgan Heritage frequently journeyed to Ghana and toured various parts of Africa. The album included Senegalese politician and mbalax musician Youssou N'Dour, Ghanaian reggae-dancehall artist Shatta Wale, Beenie Man, Shaggy, Popcaan and Made Kuti.

Broken Chord, a South African production by composer Thuthuka Sibisi, quartet of singers; Nokuthula Magubane, Avuya Ngcaweni, Tshegofatso Khunwane, Luvo Rasemeni and led by Gregory Maqoma made its US premiere at the Brooklyn Academy of Music.The production focused on the African Native Choir, a group of South African singers who toured England and North America inclusive of an audience with Queen Victoria in the 19th century. The choir encountered racism and colonial mindsets during the tour.

Sylvia Glasser and MID's artistic director Sunnyboy Mandla Motau premiered work that celebrated African women and their origins. The double bill dance performance, titled Umthombo/Baobab, was showcased at Durban's Playhouse Company on August 18, 2023, and August 19, 2023, as part of the SA Women's Arts Festival 2023. Motau articulated that the performance aimed to highlight Africa's rich cultural heritage, the significance of embracing one's roots, and delved into the journey of personal growth and societal advancement. Motau further expressed a desire to explore African history and narratives predating colonization and humanity teachings of African people. Choreographed by Glasser the performance drew inspiration from the baobab tree's traits, representing a variety of themes such as its unconventional beauty and resilience.

Ugandan songwriter-singer Joshua Baraka's sophomore EP, Watershed which fused soul, afrofusion and R'n'B debuted at No.1 on Uganda's Apple Music.

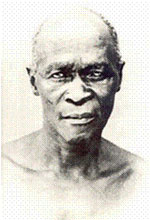
Xhosa, Chief Maqoma

In celebration of his 50th birthday, Greg Maqoma revisited his production Exit/Exist at the Pam Golding Theatre at the Baxter for three exclusive shows, which took place from Thursday, October 5, 2023, to Saturday, October 7, 2023. The production held a significant importance in Maqoma's career over the years and additionally marked his second-to-last performance in South Africa, as Maqoma retired from dancing later that year. Exit/Exist, directed by James Ngcobo, delved into the memory of Maqoma's distant ancestor, Chief Jongumsobomvu Maqoma, one of the most celebrated Xhosa leaders. Born in 1798, he was imprisoned for ordering the British colonizers to return Xhosa land and ultimately passed away on Robben Island prison in 1873. Gregory Maqoma explored the ancestral reverberations that connected him to that history. He began with portraying urban sophistication in a silk suit, then transitioned through a process of initiation and ritual observance while wearing a cowhide tunic, connecting with the memory of his rural ancestor. Prior to Maqoma's performance of the work, he needed to obtain permission directly from the chief. He stood before chief Maqoma's grave on a blustery hill in the Eastern Cape, under rainy skies. Gregory Maqoma said, "It rained the same day his remains were brought from Robben Island." Magqoma further stipulated that "the return of Exit/Exist to the South African audience is not only befitting to the extraordinary journey I have taken so far, but marks 150 years since the passing of my ancestor, Chief Maqoma". Four vocalists, Tobela Mpela, Sizwe Nhlapo, Lubabalo Velebayi and Sipho Mhlanga, accompanied by world-fusion Italian guitarist Giuliano Modarelli, joined Maqoma live on stage to present the music score composed by Simphiwe Dana, aided by the musical direction of Happy Motha.

Songstress Buhlebendalo Mda, performed at the Standard Bank Joy of Jazz Festival held at the Sandton Convention Centre in Johannesburg on September 29, 2023, and September 30, 2023. Accompanied by an all-female band, Mda's performance blended traditional Xhosa sounds with afro-fusion elements, inclusive of storytelling and sacred African spirituality. Throughout her performance, Buhlebendalo Mda periodically burned imphepho, a traditional ritual honoring the presence of ancestors. Mda is a former member of the afro-soul a cappella ensemble,The Soil.

American rappers Don Toliver and Offset released the single, "Worth It". The song's instrumental featured afro-fusion elements.

In 2024, Greg Maqoma was bestowed The Encore Award at the 59th Fleur du Cap Theatre Awards in recognition of his adept fusion of contemporary dance and indigenous movement as well as for the lasting impact he has had on South Africa's cultural storytelling. Nigerians, rapper Olamide and musical artist Asake's song "Amapiano" received a nomination for the inaugural Best African Music Performance category at the 66th Annual Grammy Awards. Additionally, former US President Barack Obama included the song in his list of favorite music for 2023. According to Collins Badewa of Style Rave, the song is characterized by "an infectious blend of energetic beats, vibrant melodies and catchy hooks". It gained recognition for fusing elements from hip hop, amapiano, afrobeats, deep house, and a "neo-fuji" aesthetic, creating a distinct rhythmic sound. Asake's studio album, Work of Art features the song as a single. Douglas Markowitz, writing for the Grammy Awards in 2024, observed that while the song paid tribute to the amapiano genre, it in fact, reimagined certain elements such as the iconic log drum. The lyrics predominantly feature Yoruba language and Nigerian Pidgin, interspersed with fragments of English.

== See also ==
- Sacred dance
- Ecstatic dance
- Ceremonial dance
- Music of the African diaspora
- African-American dance
- Magogo kaDinuzulu
- The Jazz Epistles
- The Skylarks
- Mahotella Queens
- Osibisa
- Assagai
- Bright Blue
- Savuka
- Skinflint
- Jain
- Nathy Peluso
- Dev Hynes
- Makeba
- Jump
