= Order of Ikhamanga =

South African award

Awarded by President of South Africa
- Type: Civilian national order
- Established: 30 November 2003
- Eligibility: South African citizens
- Awarded for: Excellence in the fields of arts, culture, literature, music, journalism or sport
- Status: Currently constituted
- Grades: Gold (OIG); Silver (OIS); Bronze (OIB)
- Ribbon of the order

The Order of Ikhamanga is a South African civilian honour that recognises achievements in arts, culture, literature, music, journalism, and sports. Before the order was established on 30 November 2003, such achievements were recognised by the Order of the Baobab. The Order of Ikhamanga is granted by the President of South Africa to South African citizens. Ikhamanga is the Xhosa name for Strelitzia reginae, a flower.

== Classes ==
The order has three classes:

- Gold (OIG), for exceptional achievement
- Silver (OIS), for excellent achievement
- Bronze (OIB), for outstanding achievement

== Design ==
The egg-shaped badge depicts a rising sun, a "Lydenburg head", two strelitzia flowers, a drum, three circles, and two roadways. The head represents the arts, the sun represents glory, the circles symbolise sport, and the roads represent the long road to excellence. The South African coat of arms is displayed on the reverse.

The ribbon is gold with four cream-coloured lines inset from each edge and a pattern of recurring stylised dancing figures down the centre. All three classes are worn around the neck.

The Order of Ikhamanga was designed by Charles Peter Gareth Smart, a graphic designer based in Pretoria, South Africa.

== Recipients ==
The table below lists the members of the Order of Ikhamanga.

Members of the Order of Ikhamanga
| Recipient | Class | Year | Field | Ref. |
|---|---|---|---|---|
| Bessie Head † | Gold | 2003 | Literature | |
| Alex La Guma † | Gold | 2003 | Literature | |
| Dumile Feni † | Gold | 2003 | Visual arts | |
| Cecil Skotnes | Gold | 2003 | Visual arts | |
| Steve Mokone | Gold | 2003 | Football | |
| Gary Player | Gold | 2003 | Golf | |
| Magogo ka Dinizulu † | Gold | 2003 | Music | |
| 2010 Soccer World Cup Bid Committee | Gold | 2004 | Football administration | |
| Natalie du Toit | Gold | 2004, 2009 | Swimming | |
| Joseph Albert Mashite Mokoena † | Gold | 2004 | Mathematics | |
| George Pemba † | Gold | 2004 | Visual arts | |
| N. P. van Wyk Louw † | Gold | 2005 | Literature | |
| A. C. Jordan † | Gold | 2005 | Literature | |
| Alan Stewart Paton † | Gold | 2006 | Literature | |
| Tiyo Soga † | Gold | 2006 | Literature | |
| Elisabeth Eybers | Gold | 2007 | Literature (poetry) | |
| Selope Thema † | Gold | 2008 | Journalism | |
| Lewis Pugh | Gold | 2009 | Swimming | |
| Miriam Makeba † | Gold | 2009 | Music | |
| Jonas Gwangwa | Gold | 2010 | Music | |
| Hugh Masekela | Gold | 2010 | Music | |
| Danny Jordaan | Gold | 2011 | Football administration | |
| Molefi Oliphant | Gold | 2011 | Football administration | |
| Irvin Khoza | Gold | 2011 | Football administration | |
| Julian Bahula | Gold | 2012 | Music | |
| Benedict Wallet Vilakazi † | Gold | 2016 | Literature | |
| Mamokgethi Phakeng | Gold | 2016 | Science | |
| Amandla Cultural Ensemble | Gold | 2011 | Zulu language and culture | |
| Wayde van Niekerk | Gold | 2017 | Athletics | |
| Johaar Mosaval | Gold | 2019 | Ballet | |
| Raymond Louw † | Gold | 2021 | Journalism | |
| David Maphalla | Gold | 2021 | Literature and Sotho culture | |
| Sibusiso Nyembezi † | Gold | 2021 | Literature and Zulu language | |
| Joseph Shabalala † | Gold | 2021 | Music (Isicathamiya) | |
| Desiree Ellis | Gold | 2023 | Football | |
| Siya Kolisi | Gold | 2023 | Rugby | |
| Solomon Linda † | Gold | 2023 | Music | |
| Mono Arthur Sipho Badela | Gold | 2023 | Journalism | |
| Bokwe James Mafuna | Gold | 2023 | Journalism | |
| Noni Jabavu† | Gold | 2024 | Journalism | |
| Aggrey Klaaste† | Gold | 2024 | Journalism | |
| Madala Kunene | Gold | 2024 | Music | |
| Rassie Erasmus | Gold | 2026 | Rugby | |
| Wouter Kellerman | Gold | 2026 | Music | |
| Todd Matshikiza † | Gold | 2026 | Music | |
| Khabi Vivian Mngoma | Gold | 2026 | Music | |
| Kippie Moeketsi † | Gold | 2026 | Music | |
| Queeneth Maria Ndaba † | Gold | 2026 | Theatre | |
| Molefe Pheto † | Gold | 2026 | Theatre | |
| Hestrie Cloete | Silver | 2003 | Athletics | |
| Sydney Maree | Silver | 2003 | Athletics | |
| Zanele Situ | Silver | 2003 | Athletics | |
| Basil D'Oliveira | Silver | 2003 | Cricket | |
| Eric Majola | Silver | 2003 | Cricket | |
| Penny Heyns | Silver | 2003 | Swimming | |
| Lionel Ngakane | Silver | 2003 | Film | |
| Jake Tuli | Silver | 2003 | Boxing | |
| Ken Gampu † | Silver | 2003 | Performing arts | |
| Gladys Mgudlandlu † | Silver | 2003 | Visual arts | |
| Sewsunker Sewgolum † | Silver | 2004 | Golf | |
| Theo Mthembu | Silver | 2004 | Boxing | |
| Elijah Makhathini | Silver | 2004 | Boxing | |
| Hassan Howa † | Silver | 2004 | Cricket administration | |
| Alf Kumalo | Silver | 2004 | Photojournalism | |
| Sathima Bea Benjamin | Silver | 2004 | Music (jazz) | |
| Vera Gow Adams | Silver | 2004 | Music (opera) | |
| Dolly Rathebe † | Silver | 2004 | Music | |
| Elsa Joubert | Silver | 2004 | Journalism | |
| Johan Degenaar | Silver | 2004 | Philosophy | |
| James Matthews | Silver | 2004 | Literature (poetry) | |
| Ingrid Jonker † | Silver | 2004 | Literature (poetry) | |
| Helen Sebidi | Silver | 2004 | Visual and creative arts | |
| Stephanus Lombaard | Silver | 2005 | Athletics | |
| Lucas Radebe | Silver | 2005 | Football | |
| Peter Edward Clarke | Silver | 2005 | Visual arts and literature | |
| Allina Ndebele | Silver | 2005 | Visual and creative arts | |
| Henry Nxumalo † | Silver | 2005 | Journalism | |
| John Kani | Silver | 2005 | Theatre | |
| Athol Fugard | Silver | 2005 | Theatre | |
| Sophie Thoko Mgcina | Silver | 2005 | Performing arts | |
| George Singh † | Silver | 2006 | Football administration | |
| Ryk Neethling | Silver | 2006 | Swimming | |
| Roland Schoeman | Silver | 2006 | Swimming | |
| André Brink | Silver | 2006 | Literature | |
| Donato Francisco Mattera | Silver | 2006 | Literature and journalism | |
| Canodoise Daniel Themba † | Silver | 2006 | Literature and journalism | |
| Thandi Klaasen | Silver | 2006 | Music | |
| Dorothy Masuka | Silver | 2006 | Music | |
| Abigail Kubeka | Silver | 2006 | Music | |
| Willie Bester | Silver | 2006 | Visual arts | |
| Esther Mahlangu | Silver | 2006 | Visual arts (Ndebele arts) | |
| Boy Adolphus Mvemve | Silver | 2006 | Anti-apartheid struggle | |
| Yvonne Bryceland | Silver | 2006 | Performing arts | |
| Mandla Langa | Silver | 2007 | Literature and journalism | |
| Wally Serote | Silver | 2007 | Literature (poetry) | |
| Gladys Thomas | Silver | 2007 | Literature | |
| Henry Segome Ramaila | Silver | 2007 | Literature in Pedi | |
| Eddie Roux † | Silver | 2007 | Journalism and political literature | |
| Nat Nakasa † | Silver | 2007 | Journalism | |
| Schalk Pienaar † | Silver | 2007 | Journalism | |
| Morné du Plessis | Silver | 2007 | Rugby | |
| Kitch Christie † | Silver | 2007 | Rugby coaching | |
| Sam Ramsamy | Silver | 2007 | Sports administration | |
| Manhattan Brothers | Silver | 2007 | Music (jazz) | |
| William Kentridge | Silver | 2007 | Visual arts and theatre | |
| Percy Montgomery | Silver | 2008 | Rugby | |
| Bryan Habana | Silver | 2008 | Rugby | |
| Stanley Hlekani Sono | Silver | 2008 | Football and boxing | |
| Patrick Ntsoelengoe † | Silver | 2008 | Football | |
| Makhaya Ntini | Silver | 2008 | Cricket | |
| Shaun Pollock | Silver | 2008 | Cricket | |
| Gobingca George Mxadana | Silver | 2008 | Music (choral music) | |
| Sibongile Khumalo | Silver | 2008 | Music (jazz and opera) | |
| Ladysmith Black Mambazo | Silver | 2008 | Music | |
| Lionel Morrison | Silver | 2008 | Journalism | |
| Peter Abrahams | Silver | 2008 | Literature | |
| Alfred Hutchinson † | Silver | 2008 | Literature | |
| Miriam Tlali | Silver | 2008 | Literature | |
| Keorapetse Kgositsile | Silver | 2008 | Literature (poetry) | |
| Lauretta Ngcobo | Silver | 2008 | Literature | |
| Lewis Nkosi | Silver | 2008 | Literature | |
| Zakes Mokae | Silver | 2008 | Performing arts | |
| Ronnie Govender | Silver | 2008 | Theatre | |
| Barbara Jurgens (née Tyrell) | Silver | 2008 | Visual arts | |
| Abdullah Ibrahim | Silver | 2009 | Music | |
| Caiphus Semenya | Silver | 2009 | Music | |
| Letta Mbulu | Silver | 2009 | Music | |
| Jan Rabie † | Silver | 2009 | Literature | |
| Winston Ntshona | Silver | 2010 | Theatre and arts | |
| Makana Football Association | Silver | 2010 | Football | |
| Grant Khomo † | Silver | 2010 | Rugby | |
| Ernst van Dyk | Silver | 2010 | Wheelchair racing | |
| Nothembi Mkhwebane | Silver | 2010 | Music in Ndebele | |
| Percy Qoboza † | Silver | 2010 | Journalism | |
| David Goldblatt | Silver | 2011 | Photography | |
| Marlene van Niekerk | Silver | 2011 | Literature and philosophy | |
| Ray Phiri | Silver | 2011 | Music | |
| Busi Mhlongo | Silver | 2011 | Music | |
| Josiah Thugwane | Silver | 2011 | Athletics | |
| Mannie Manim | Silver | 2011 | Theatre | |
| Doc Bikitsha | Silver | 2011 | Journalism and literature | |
| Johnny Clegg | Silver | 2012 | Music | |
| Muthal Naidoo | Silver | 2012 | Literature and drama | |
| Cheeky Watson | Silver | 2012 | Rugby | |
| Joe Thloloe | Silver | 2012 | Journalism and literature | |
| Gladys Faith Algulhas | Silver | 2012 | Performing arts | |
| Chad le Clos | Silver | 2013 | Swimming | |
| Kaizer Motaung | Silver | 2013 | Football | |
| Ilse Hayes | Silver | 2013 | Athletics | |
| Pretty Yende | Silver | 2013 | Music (opera) | |
| Vusi Mahlasela | Silver | 2013 | Music | |
| Zolani Mkiva | Silver | 2013 | Praise poetry | |
| Victor Ntoni † | Silver | 2014 | Music (jazz) | |
| Lindiwe Mabuza | Silver | 2014 | Cultural activism | |
| Sandra Prinsloo | Silver | 2014 | Performing arts | |
| Rashid Lombard | Silver | 2014 | Music (jazz administration) | |
| Zakes Mda | Silver | 2014 | Literature | |
| Lucas Sithole | Silver | 2014 | Tennis | |
| Cameron van der Burgh | Silver | 2014 | Swimming | |
| Fanie van der Merwe | Silver | 2014 | Athletics | |
| Jomo Sono | Silver | 2014 | Football | |
| Darius Dhlomo | Silver | 2015 | Football and boxing | |
| Mbulelo Mzamane † | Silver | 2015 | Literature | |
| Johnny Mekoa | Silver | 2015 | Music (jazz) | |
| Winnie Busisiwe Mahlangu | Silver | 2015 | Radio broadcasting | |
| Marguerite Poland | Silver | 2016 | Literature and anthropology | |
| Sylvia "Magogo" Glasser | Silver | 2016 | Dance | |
| Thomas Chauke | Silver | 2016 | Music in Tsonga | |
| Zinjiva Winston Nkondo † | Silver | 2017 | Literature (poetry) and radio broadcasting | |
| John Smith | Silver | 2017 | Rowing | |
| Matthew Brittain | Silver | 2017 | Rowing | |
| James Thompson | Silver | 2017 | Rowing | |
| Sizwe Ndlovu | Silver | 2017 | Rowing | |
| Khaba Mkhize † | Silver | 2017 | Journalism | |
| Jeff Opland | Silver | 2017 | History | |
| Nakedi Ribane | Silver | 2018 | Performing arts and literature | |
| Hashim Amla | Silver | 2018 | Cricket | |
| John Smit | Silver | 2018 | Rugby | |
| Elana Meyer | Silver | 2018 | Athletics | |
| Neil Tovey | Silver | 2018 | Football | |
| Eric Risimati Baloyi | Silver | 2018 | Boxing coaching | |
| Sipho Hotstix Mabuse | Silver | 2018 | Music | |
| Johan Botha † | Silver | 2018 | Music (opera) | |
| Omar Badsha | Silver | 2018 | History | |
| John Koenakeefe Motlhankana † | Silver | 2018 | Visual arts | |
| Thami Mnyele † | Silver | 2018 | Visual arts | |
| Lillian Dube | Silver | 2018 | Performing arts | |
| Achmat Davids † | Silver | 2019 | Literature | |
| Jacques Kallis | Silver | 2019 | Cricket | |
| Yvonne Chaka Chaka | Silver | 2019 | Music | |
| Nomhle Nkonyeni | Silver | 2019 | Performing arts | |
| Mary Twala | Silver | 2019 | Performing arts | |
| Benjamin Pogrund | Silver | 2019 | Journalism | |
| Mathatha Tsedu | Silver | 2019 | Journalism | |
| Fee Halsted-Berning | Silver | 2021 | Visual arts | |
| Rebecca Malope | Silver | 2021 | Music (gospel) | |
| Arthur Mayisela † | Silver | 2021 | Boxing | |
| Keith Gottschalk | Silver | 2023 | Literature (poetry) | |
| Bongiwe Dhlomo-Mautloa | Silver | 2023 | Visual arts | |
| Duma Ndlovu | Silver | 2023 | Film and television | |
| Mthuthuzeli Ben Nomoyi † | Silver | 2023 | Film and television | |
| Mfundi Vundla | Silver | 2023 | Film and television | |
| Freek Robinson | Silver | 2023 | Journalism | |
| Angus Gibson | Silver | 2024 | Film and television | |
| Emile YX? | Silver | 2024 | Music | |
| Saray Khumalo | Silver | 2024 | | |
| Sophie Mahlangu | Silver | 2024 | | |
| Madosini† | Silver | 2024 | | |
| TD Mweli Skota† | Silver | 2024 | | |
| Jonathan Butler | Silver | 2026 | Music | |
| Johnny Dyani † | Silver | 2026 | Music | |
| Andiswa Gebashe | Silver | 2026 | | |
| Norman Hlabane | Silver | 2026 | Boxing | |
| Trevor Jones | Silver | 2026 | Film and television | |
| Oliver Kgadime Matsepe † | Silver | 2026 | Literature (poetry) | |
| Oscar “Oskido” Mdlongwa | Silver | 2026 | Music | |
| Deuteronomy Bhekinkosi Zeblon Ntuli | Silver | 2026 | Literature | |
| Benjamin Tyamzashe † | Silver | 2026 | Music | |
| Gerrie Coetzee | Bronze | 2003 | Boxing | |
| Goolam Abed | Bronze | 2003 | Rugby and cricket | |
| Victor Ralushai | Bronze | 2004 | History | |
| Jeanne Zaidel-Rudolph | Bronze | 2004 | Music | |
| Teboho Mokgalagadi | Bronze | 2005 | Athletics | |
| Marjorie Wallace | Bronze | 2005 | Visual arts | |
| Mildred Mangxola | Bronze | 2005 | Music | |
| Mahlathini Simon Nkabinde | Bronze | 2005 | Music | |
| Hilda Tloubatla | Bronze | 2005 | Music | |
| Nobesuthu Mbadu | Bronze | 2005 | Music | |
| Herbert Charles Woodhouse | Bronze | 2006 | History (rock art) | |
| Sibusiso Vilane | Bronze | 2006 | Mountaineering | |
| Matlhaela Michael Masote | Bronze | 2006 | Music (choral) | |
| Christian Ashley-Botha | Bronze | 2006 | Music (choral) | |
| Oscar Pistorius | Bronze | 2006 | Athletics | |
| Khotso Mokoena | Bronze | 2009 | Athletics | |
| Sindiwe Magona | Bronze | 2011 | Literature | |
| Sam Nzima | Bronze | 2011 | Photojournalism | |
| Thokozani Mandlenkosi Ernest Nene † | Bronze | 2011 | Zulu language and culture | |
| Caster Semenya | Bronze | 2014 | Athletics | |
| Mbulaeni Mulaudzi † | Bronze | 2015 | Athletics | |
| Themba Patrick Magaisa | Bronze | 2015 | Literature | |
| Laurika Rauch | Bronze | 2016 | Music | |
| Arthur Nuthall Fula | Bronze | 2017 | Literature | |
| Elsa Meyer | Bronze | 2018 | Athletics (senior) | |
| John Arthur Black | Bronze | 2023 | Mountaineering | |
| Warren Neil Eva | Bronze | 2023 | Mountaineering | |
| Mike Horn | Bronze | 2023 | Mountaineering | |
| Irene Mawela | Bronze | 2023 | Performing arts | |
| Gavin James Krastin | Bronze | 2026 | | |
| Dalene Matthee † | Bronze | 2026 | Literature | |
| Oscar Mdlongwa | Gold | 2026 | Music | |

== See also ==
- South African civil honours
