= Grant Khomo =

South African sportsman, rugby player, tennis player,educator and sports administrator

- Born: 1921 (age 104–105); Potgietersrus, Transvaal, Union of South Africa
- Occupations: Sportsman, rugby player, educator, sports administrator
- Known for: Rugby, tennis, sports administration
- Office: President of the South African African Rugby Board
- Awards: Order of Ikhamanga in Silver (posthumous, 2010)

Grant Khomo was a South African sportsman, rugby player, educator, and sports administrator. He was one of the leading Black rugby figures in South Africa in the mid-20th century and was also described as an accomplished all-round athlete in tennis, soccer, and athletics. He later served as president of the South African African Rugby Board (SAARB). In 2010, he was posthumously awarded the Order of Ikhamanga in Silver for his contribution to rugby and sports administration.

== Early life and education ==
Khomo was born in 1921 in Potgietersrus in the Transvaal, now known as Mokopane, in the Limpopo province of South Africa. Rugby histories described him as having represented his province in athletics, soccer, and tennis before rising to prominence in rugby. Khomo attended the University Fort Hare in 1940, where he trained as a teacher. In 1943 Khomo took up a teaching post at Orlando High School in Soweto, the same year that rugby was introduced to schools.

== Sporting career ==
=== Tennis Career and Style ===
Khomo competed during the height of the apartheid era, which restricted Black athletes to playing within the South African National Non-European Tennis Association (SANNETA). Despite the lack of access to premier facilities like Ellis Park, Khomo emerged as one of the most respected players in the country.

=== Playing Style ===
Khomo was noted for a cerebral and tactical approach to tennis. His peers in the 1950s described his game as one of high precision and mental endurance, likely influenced by his experience as a rugby tactician. He was known for his baseline accuracy and a versatile net game that allowed him to remain competitive against younger opponents well into his 40s.

== Major achievements and titles ==
Khomo's tennis peak coincided with his professional career as an educator and his captaincy of the national African rugby team. He held the National African Tennis Title multiple times during the late 1940s and early 1950s, and he frequently captained the Transvaal inter-provincial tennis teams. Khomo became one of the few South African athletes to earn "Triple-Blue" recognition, representing his country or province at the highest level in rugby, cricket, and tennis.

== Rugby career ==
Besides being a tennis player, Khomo is best known for his rugby career. The Presidency of South Africa has described him as "one of the best center three-quarters South Africa has ever had" and credits him with helping dispel racist assumptions that rugby excellence was limited to white players. Khomo's first introduction to rugby came while studying at the University of Fort Hare in the 1940s. After university he returned north and captained a Transvaal side composed largely of Cape-born players recruited by mining companies for their rugby abilities.

In September 1950, he captained the first Bantu Springboks, an African national rugby team, to a 14–3 victory over their colored counterparts at the Port Elizabeth Agricultural Show grounds and remained captain for the following two years, according to later rugby reporting.

== Administration ==
Khomo later became a rugby administrator and served as president of the South African African Rugby Board (SAARB). The Presidency records that his and his colleagues' efforts to form a non-racial rugby board in South Africa were documented in SAARB minutes. A 1974 survey reproduced by South African History Online identified Khomo as president of the SAARB during a period of contestation between racially segregated and non-racial rugby structures in South Africa.

== Legacy ==
The Grant Khomo Week, a national under-16 rugby tournament in South Africa, is named in his honour. Rugby365 has described him as the namesake of the national under-16 week, while later rugby coverage continues to refer to the event as a major fixture in the South African youth rugby calendar.

In 2010, Khomo was posthumously awarded The Order of Ikhamanga in Silver by the South African government for "excellent achievement in the field of rugby and his contribution as an excellent sport administrator".

== See also ==
- Order of Ikhamanga
- University of Fort Hare
