= Molefi Oliphant =

Molefi Nathanael Oliphant OIG (born 6 March 1952) is a South African sports and football administrator. Molefi has held various positions in local and internal football structures, including the National Olympic Committee of South Africa, Council of Southern African Football Association (COSAFA) and the International Federation of Football Associations (FIFA). Molefi was one of the key figures in bringing the 2010 FIFA World Cup to South Africa.

== Accolades ==
Molefi has received several accolades for his work in soccer administration in South Africa and abroad, including a school which is named after him and the Order of Ikhamanga in Gold in 2011.
