= Sam Ramsamy =

South African activist (born 1938)

- Born: 27 January 1938 (age 87); Durban, South Africa

Sam Ramsamy OIS (born 27 January 1938) is an educator, activist and sports administrator from South Africa.

== Career ==
Ramsamy was a physical education lecturer and a primary school teacher.

In the 1980s, he was a high-profile anti-apartheid campaigner in London and was chairman of the South Africa Non-racial Olympic Committee (SAN-ROC) during the apartheid years from 1976 to 1990, campaigning against discrimination in sport and against the participation of South Africa's white-only teams in international sporting events.

He returned to South Africa upon the lifting of ban on the ANC and became the President of South Africa's official National Olympic Committee from 1991. He led the first non-racial South African team to the 1992 Barcelona Olympics. He has served with the International Swimming Federation bureau and is currently also a vice-president and official FINA spokesman at all official events. He was inducted into the International Swimming Hall of Fame (ISHOF) in 2023 for his life-long contribution to the sport. Ramsamy was a member of the International Olympic Committee (1995-2018) and it's Executive Board (2006-2014) and sat on the Commission evaluating the bids for the 2012 Summer Olympics in London.

He was a member of the IOC co-ordination committee for the 2012 London Games. Ramsamy ceased to be a member at the end of 2018 when as per protocol he retired after turning 80.

In May 2011, following the announcement that South Africa will not bid for the 2020 Olympic Games, Ramsamy told Olympic news source Around the Rings that he was "disappointed" in the government's decision, but he is "certain" they will bid for 2024.
