= Darius Dhlomo =

South African association footballer

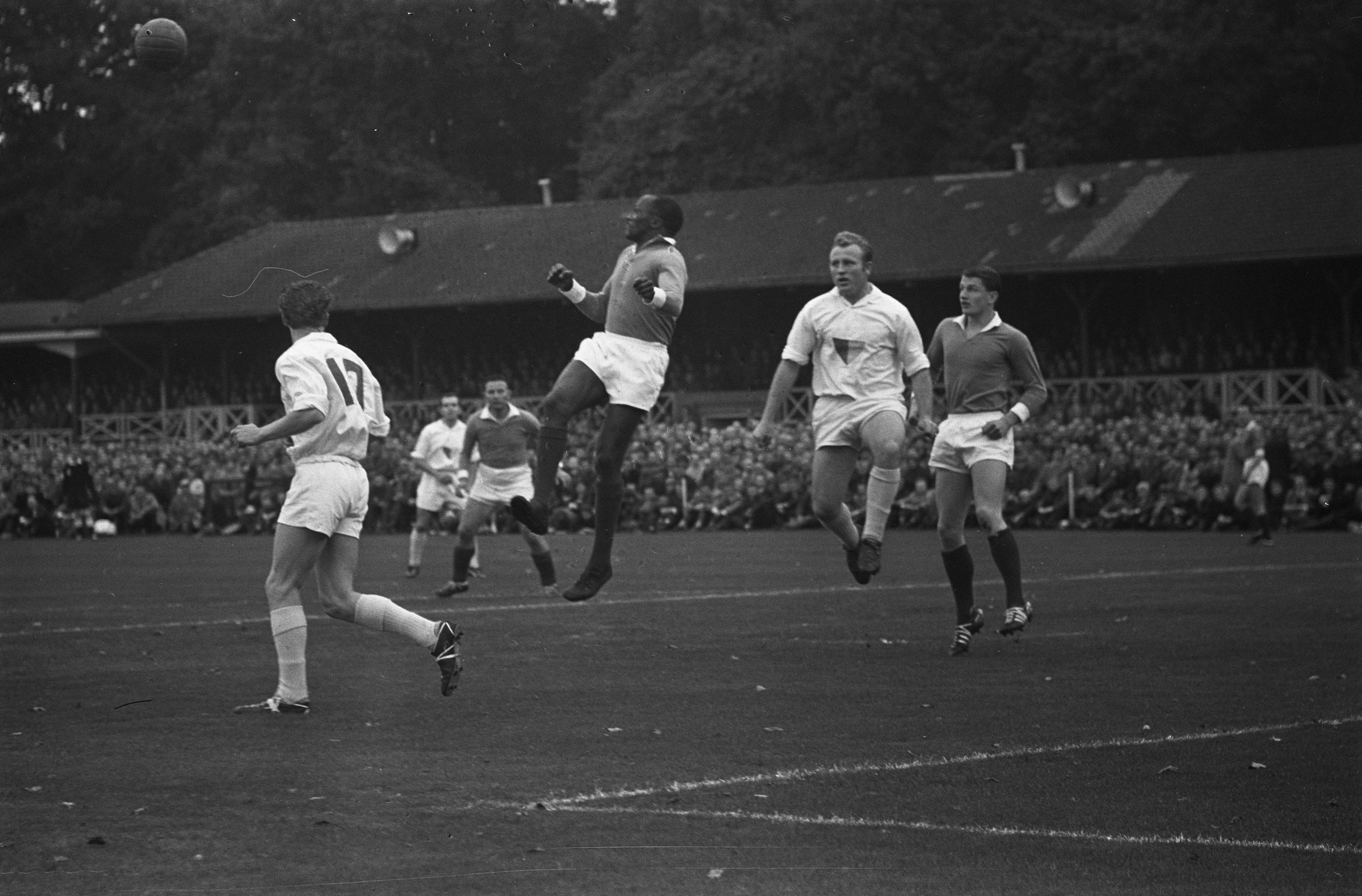
- Dhlomo in action for Enschedese Boys (21-10-1962)

Personal information
- Full name: Darius Mfana Temba Dhlomo
- Born: 9 August 1931 Durban, South Africa
- Died: 13 June 2015 (aged 83) Enschede, Netherlands

Darius Mfana Temba Dhlomo (9 August 1931 – 13 June 2015 in Enschede) was a South African footballer, boxer, musician and a political activist.

Born in Durban, he was the son of Ellias Dhlomo, a Lutheran Church of Southern Africa Priest. He began competing in non-white boxing contests in apartheid-era South Africa. A victory in Durban in 1956 over Gilbert Petros brought him the Natal non-white middleweight title and then, by defeating Ezrom Ngcobo, he became the non-white South African cruiserweight champion.

Alongside his budding boxing career, he was the captain of both the Baumannville City Blacks football team and the Natal national football team. Further to this, he also sang in a jazz quintet – a fact which led Drum, a national magazine aimed at the black South African market, to publish a feature on him titled "Darius Dhlomo, Man of Many Talents". He decided to move to the Netherlands having signed a professional football contract with Heracles Almelo in 1958, joining up with Steve Mokone who was the first black South African to play in the European leagues.

Before his debut match against Rigtersbleek, Dhlomo's absence sparked a search – striker Joop Schuman found him changing underneath the grandstand, unaware that a black player would be allowed into the team changing room. He won the support of the team's fanbase with his aggressive style and demonstrated his technical ability with passes using the outside of his boot – a trick which became commonplace in later years. Dhlomo and Mokone became prominent role models for black South Africans as the sportsmen were among the few people of such ancestry to enjoy prominence in a largely white society.

Despite success abroad, his position as an activist for the African National Congress meant he was not allowed to return home to the National Party-governed South Africa. The funerals of his mother, brother and sister were all held in his absence. While still continuing his boxing and music careers in the Netherlands, he went on to play football for Vitesse Arnhem, DHC Delft, Tubantia Hengelo and Enschedese Boys. Exiled from South Africa, he settled in Enschede and later worked as a teacher, social worker and a municipal councillor for the Labour Party.

He received permission to return to South Africa in 1992 and met with Nelson Mandela. Dhlomo was taken aback by the level of recognition he received in South Africa after an absence of over thirty years. The 2010 FIFA World Cup – hosted in South Africa – saw the media spotlight return to Dhlomo, and his life became the subject of a number of Dutch television specials. He performed as a live jazz musician, touring as "Darius Dhlomo and his swinging-4".

In 2015, he received South Africa's second highest honour for sporting achievement - the Order of Ikhamanga (Silver Class) for "his excellent talent in various sporting codes. His tenacity, sheer talent and triumph in sport inspiring generations of aspiring footballers and boxers who saw in him the epitome of excellence."
