= Theo Mthembu =

South African boxer

Theo Mthembu (27 February 1927 – 1 March 2007) was a South African professional boxer and renowned boxing trainer. Mthembu is known to have produced boxers such as Anthony "Blue Jaguar" Morodi, Levy " Golden Boy" Madi, and world renowned Jacob "Baby Jake" Matlala.

== Awards ==
Mthembu has received numerous awards for his contribution to boxing in South Africa. Some of his awards include:

- Jack Cheetham Memorial award - for contributing in sport
- President Award in Silver - awarded by former President Nelson Mandela
- Life Time Achievement Award - by Boxing South Africa
- King Kong Meritorious Award
- Special Recognition for Achievement - by the Gauteng Government
- Order of Ikhamanga in Silver - for contributing in boxing
