= Sibongile Khumalo =

South African opera singer (1957–2021)

Sibongile Khumalo OIS
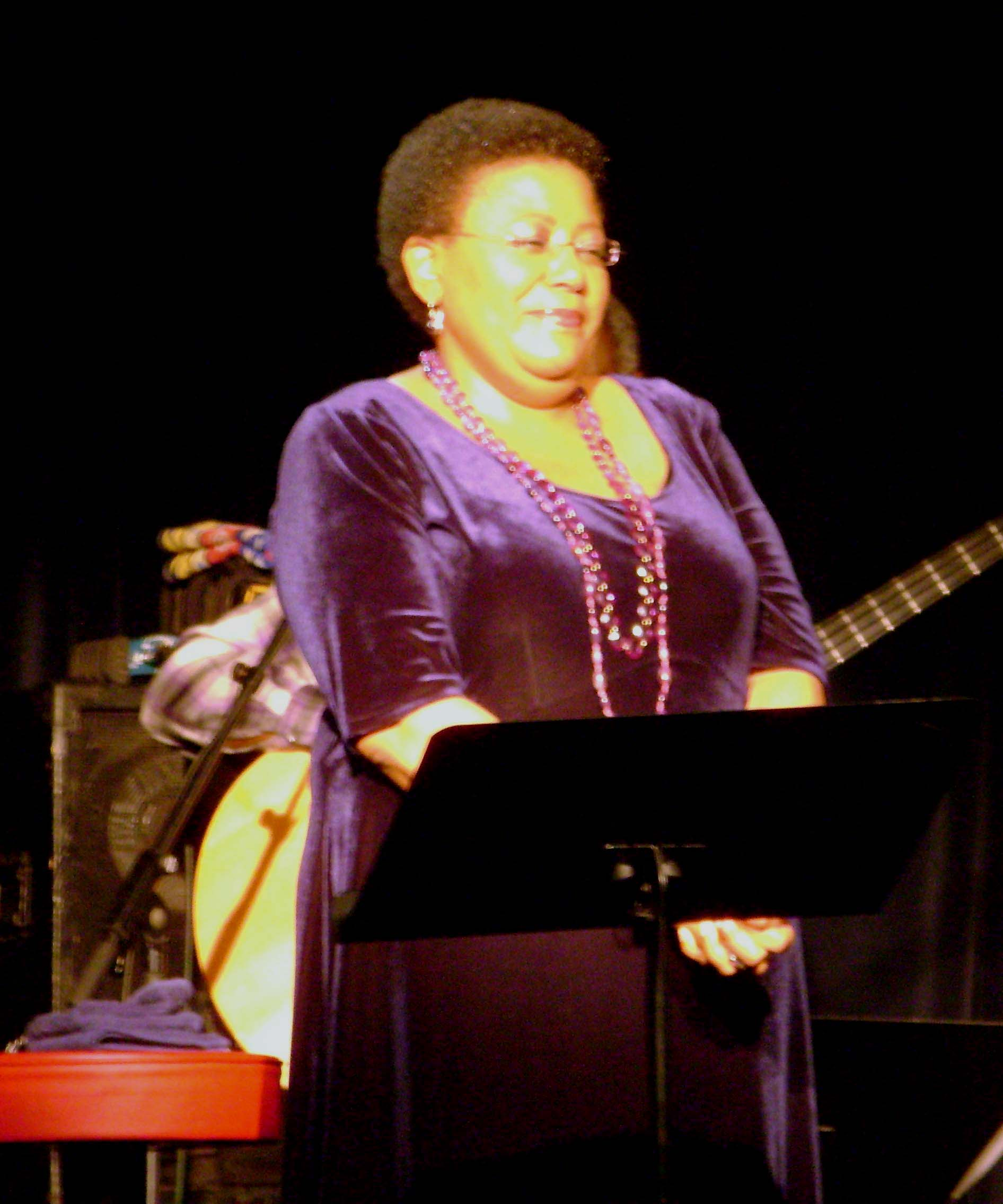
- Khumalo in 2008

Background information
- Born: 24 September 1957; Orlando West, Soweto, Johannesburg, South Africa
- Died: 28 January 2021 (aged 63)
- Occupation: Singer
- Instrument: Vocals
- Years active: 1992–2021

Sibongile Khumalo (24 September 1957 – 28 January 2021) was a South African singer and songwriter. She sang classical, jazz, opera and traditional South African music. She was noted for singing at the inauguration of Nelson Mandela in 1994, as well as the final of the Rugby World Cup the following year. She was appointed to the Order of Ikhamanga in 2008.

== Early life ==
Khumalo was born in Orlando West, Soweto, in Johannesburg, South Africa, on 24 September 1957. Her mother worked as a nurse; her father, Khabi Mngoma, was a professor of music. He inspired her to pursue music and Khumalo started learning when she was eight years old. She studied music at the University of Zululand, obtaining a Bachelor of Arts from that institution. She proceeded to earn a second Bachelor of Arts (with honours) from the University of the Witwatersrand, along with a postgraduate diploma in personnel management from the Wits Business School.

== Career ==
=== Academia ===
Khumalo taught at her alma mater, University of Zululand, and the Madimba Institute of African Music during the 1980s. During this time, she was also the Head of the Music department at the Federated Union of Black Arts. She served as the Arts Centre coordinator at the FUNDA Centre.

=== Music ===
Khumalo began her career in singing at the Kippies Jazz International in 1992. She went on to win the Standard Bank Young Artist Award at the National Arts Festival in Grahamstown the following year. Her show which sold-out, called The Three Faces of Sibongile Khumalo, involved a mix of jazz, opera, and local indigenous music.

Khumalo sang at the 75th birthday of Nelson Mandela in 1993, as well as at his inauguration as President of South Africa one year later. He gave her the popular moniker of South Africa's "First Lady of Song". She subsequently led the national anthems of South Africa and of New Zealand at the final of the 1995 Rugby World Cup. She later revealed in 2017 that this was "the one and only time I’ve ever watched a rugby match, at any level, of any kind". She released her debut album, titled Ancient Evenings, the following year. Several music critics stated that this was one of her finest works.

Khumalo sang as the mezzo-soprano soloist in Verdi's Requiem when The Bach Choir under David Willcocks toured South Africa in 1997. She featured as a soloist for symphony orchestras in South Africa, and performed as the title character in Carmen, Amneris in Aida, and Azucena in Il trovatore for national theatre operas. She went on to perform internationally at the Royal Albert Hall, Royal Festival Hall, Barbican Centre, Kennedy Centre, and the HetMuzik Theater in Amsterdam.

== Allegations of unlawful enrichment at SAMRO ==
In 2019 the Southern African Music Rights Organisation (SAMRO) sued Khumalo for unlawful enrichment. According to the lawsuit, Khumalo and a number of other members of the leadership of SAMRO overpaid themselves by more than R1.6 Million rand. Allegedly, Khumalo herself was irregularly overpaid by R312 000.

SAMRO would later become the centre of a scandal regarding the underpayment of royalties to artists, much of this taking place during Khumalo's time working for the organisation.

== Later life ==
Khumalo established the Khabi Mngoma Foundation in March 2007. Named after her father, the purpose of the foundation was to raise funds for the Khongisa Academy for the Performing Arts (which was created by him), as well as to provide scholarships to talented individuals in the arts. That same year, she did a tour in Europe with Jack DeJohnette, in which they featured at the London Jazz Festival in November. She also performed in an Opera Africa production in Oslo, Norway. Khumalo toured the United States the following year with Hugh Masekela and performed at the Celebrate Brooklyn! festival.

Khumalo was awarded Silver class of the Order of Ikhamanga in 2008. This was in recognition of her contributions to the country's arts and culture. She was granted a Doctor of Music honoris causa one year later by Rhodes University in Grahamstown. She was also awarded an honorary Doctor of Musicology by the University of South Africa in Pretoria, as well as an honorary Doctor of Philosophy by the University of Zululand and an Honorary Doctorate Degree in Music from the University of the Witwatersrand which was awarded posthumously in 2021.

Khumalo released her final album, Breath of Life, in 2016. She cited financial and artistic difficulties for the seven-year hiatus, explaining how the time she spent recording in a studio was sporadic as an independent artist. She also reportedly trained as an inyanga during this time.

Khumalo died on 28 January 2021. She was 63, and suffered a stroke following a long-term period of illness prior to her death.

== Discography ==
- Ancient Evenings (1996)
- Live at the Market Theatre (1998)
- Immortal Secrets (2000)
- Quest (2002)
- Sibongile Khumalo (2006)
- Greatest Hits (2006)
- Sibongile Khumalo Live (2009)
- Breath of Life (2016)
