= Gladys Thomas =

South African poet and playwright (1922–2024)

- Occupations: Poet; Short-story writer; Playwright
- Writing career
- Notable awards: Order of Ikhamanga - Silver (2007)

Gladys Doreen Thomas (née Adams, 14 December 1934 – 2 April 2022) was a South African poet and playwright. Thomas was one of the first black South African women poets to be published. Her co-authored debut anthology, Cry Rage, was the first book of poetry to be banned in South Africa.

On 24 April 2007, Thomas was awarded the Order of Ikhamanga (Silver) for "Outstanding contribution to poetry and short stories through which she exposed the political injustices and human suffering of the apartheid regime and for raising international consciousness about the ravages of apartheid."

Thomas died on 2 April 2022, at the age of 87.

== Works ==
- Cry Rage!, 1972
- Exile Within, 1986
- Spotty Dog and Other Stories: Stories for and of South African Township Children, c.1983
- Avalon Court (Vignettes of Life of the Coloured People on the Cape Flats of Cape Town)
