= J. F. V. Phillips =

(1899-1987) South African botanist

Dr John Frederick Vicars Phillips FRSE FRSS FLS
- Born: 15 March 1899; Grahamstown, South Africa
- Died: 17 January 1987 (aged 87); Hekpoort, South Africa
- Other names: John Frederick Vickers Phillips
- Education: University of Edinburgh
- Known for: Fire ecology
- Spouse: Jeanie Dalgleish Turnbull
- Children: Jean Dorothy; Marjory; Mary; John Saunders Turnbull; Frederick Jan Smuts
- Scientific career
- Fields: Forestry

Dr John Frederick Vicars (sometimes Vickers) Phillips FRSE FRSS FLS (15 March 1899 – 17 January 1987) was a 20th-century South African botanist. He was an advocate of fire ecology theories.

== Early life and career ==
He was born in Grahamstown in South Africa on 15 March 1899, the only son of Emily Dorothy Lovemore (born 1858) and her husband, Prof John Robert Centilivres Phillips (1850–1940).

He was educated at Dale College in King William's Town. He served an apprenticeship in the South African Forestry Department and then won a bursary to study at the University of Edinburgh in Scotland. There he gained a degree in forestry. He returned to South Africa as Forestry Officer in Deepwalls in Knysna undertaking ecological research on the indigenous forests. His work led him into work with Jan Smuts and Pole Evans.

In 1927 he became Deputy Director of the Tsetse fly Research Centre in Tanganyika.

In 1929 he was elected a Fellow of the Royal Society of Edinburgh. His proposers were Sir William Wright Smith, William Edgar Evans, Robert James Douglas Graham and James Ritchie.

In 1931 he was appointed Professor of Botany at the University of the Witwatersrand. There he created their first School of Ecology and established the Frankenwald Research station. He introduced courses on soil conservation in 1946. He left the university in 1948.

In the 1950s he began the Faculty of Agriculture at the University of Ghana. In 1960 he moved from Ghana to Rhodesia becoming an advisor to the World Bank and to the Food and Agriculture Organization. Between 1985 and 1986 he led a United Nations Narcotics Bureau mission to northern Thailand and other far eastern countries to investigate drug-producing crops. In 1969 he was appointed President of the South African Association for the Advancement of Science.

During his retirement he was the technical advisor on mine dumps and related problems for Anglo American plc.

He died at Bluebird Farm, Hekpoort near Gauteng in South Africa on 17 January 1987.

== Personal life ==
He married Jeanie Dalgleish Turnbull (1903–1979), whom he met while studying for a degree in the Botany Department, University of Edinburgh. They had three daughters, Jean Dorothy, Marjory and Mary, and two sons, John Saunders Turnbull and Frederick Jan Smuts.

== Publications ==
- Fire: Its Influence on Biotic Communities and Physical Factors in South and East africa (1930)
- Edology, the Foundation of Forestry (1931)
- Mortality Among Plants (1931)
- Plant Indicators in the Knsyna Region (1931)
- Committee of Inquiry into African Education (1962)
