= Khabi Vivian Mngoma =

- Born: 18 November 1922; Troyeville, Johannesburg, South Africa
- Died: 21 December 1999 (aged 77); South Africa
- Occupations: Tenor, pianist, choral conductor, music educator
- Known for: Pioneer of Black music education in South Africa
- Notable work: Establishing the music department at the University of Zululand
- Awards: Honorary Doctorate, University of the Witwatersrand (1987)

Khabi Vivian Mngoma (18 November 1922 – 21 December 1999) was a South African tenor, pianist, choral conductor, and a pioneering figure in Black music education in South Africa. Described as “a musical icon and a pioneer of music education in South Africa,” he is also the father of renowned opera singer Sibongile Khumalo.

== Early life and education ==
Khabi Mngoma was born in Troyeville, Johannesburg. He grew up in a musically fertile environment and came from musically gifted parents. His mother, Agnes Matutu Nyembe, was a schoolteacher and his father, David Zwelonke Mngoma, a virtuoso concertina-playing maskandi musician. He attended the Salvation Army Primary School (1930–1939), St Peter's Secondary School (1940–1942), Kilnerton Institution (1943–1944), and Adams College (1945–1946), where he earned his teacher's diploma in 1946.

Mngoma also continued with his music education. After initially receiving piano and singing lessons from R.C. Ellis and Simon Ngubane, he continued with Anny Lambrechts (singing), Milton Oersen (pianoforte), Joseph Spira (violin), and Joseph Trauneck (conducting). He also started studying for the B.Mus. degree at UNISA. Mngoma has achieved the diplomas UTLM, UPLM, LRSM (performer's and teacher's).

== Early career ==
Mngoma began teaching at Wilberforce Institute and Orlando High School before becoming Community Centre Supervisor of the Chiawelo Community Centre in Johannesburg in 1953. In 1957 he was promoted to Cultural Activities Officer of the Recreation and Community Services of the Municipal Non-white Affairs Department. Here he was responsible for the organisation and presentation of music classes, instrumental and vocal instruction at Black community centres and the promotion of music appreciation among Black communities in Johannesburg.

Mngoma founded the Orlando Music Society (1948), Moroka Township Music Appreciation Group (1954), Ionian Male Voice Choir and Ionian Mixed Choir (1960), and Jubilee String Players (1959), the latter the first Black string ensemble in Johannesburg. He also drove the establishment of the Syndicate of African Artists. During this time he also performed as soloist with the Durban Civic and Johannesburg Symphony Orchestras.

== Leadership and later career ==
In 1967, Mngoma received a United States Leader Exchange Grant with which he toured the US. Upon his return he became Director of Union Artists at Dorkay House. In 1975, he was appointed Senior Lecturer and Acting Head of the newly established Music Department at the University of Zululand. Here he would play a key role in widening access to formal music education for Black South African students.

Together with his role at the department, Mngoma became increasingly influential in institutionalised music studies in the 1980s, serving as the first central president of the South African Music Educator's Society and publishing several pieces in South African music journals. He retired in 1987 but continued to influence music education in South Africa.

Mngoma was awarded an honorary doctorate from the University of Witwatersrand in 1987 for his “service to the culture of the nation and to music”.

== Educational philosophy and legacy ==
Khabi Mngoma's educational philosophy centred on a balanced approach to the teaching of both African and Western music in southern Africa. When establishing the music department at the University of Zululand in 1975, he developed and refined his vision that music education should reflect the dual cultural worlds inhabited by present-day Africans. Drawing on the ideas of Cameroonian musicologist Francis Bebey, Mngoma emphasised that contemporary African identity is shaped by both African and Western cultural influences. While he acknowledged the importance of traditional practices, he argued that present-day Africans can and should engage with both traditional and modern forms of music.

Mngoma believed that the exclusion of African music in formal education limited the musical and creative potential of black students while confining white students within narrow cultural boundaries, thereby perpetuating the structures of apartheid in South African music education. He argued that:

…the teaching of western music to the exclusion of African music at all levels in the South African setting is both narrow and bigoted. It stultifies the black student because it dispenses with performance practices obtaining in his culture; it demusicates him; it reduces the capacity to enjoy music and musical creativity. And it keeps the white student in his cultural ‘laager’; it perpetuates apartheid…

Throughout his teaching and public performances, Mngoma sought to expand his students’ musical vocabulary and audiences’ listening experiences by incorporating African musical traditions alongside Western practices, encouraging musical literacy, research, and cultural relevance among African musicians. His contributions in this regard were recognised by the Council for Black Education and Research in 1987:

We salute you, son of Africa, who has taught us the alphabet of western music, and the meaning, the poetry of African music; for having fought through the many years for our music to be recognized as an imperative dimension of education in particular, and our spiritual well-being in general.

Mngoma's philosophy, recognition of the importance of both Western and African music in music curricula and advocacy for music curricula that acknowledges African music's dynamic, evolving nature within contemporary society remain significant in discussions on decolonising music education in South Africa.
