= Jonathan C. Friedman =

History professor of Holocaust and Genocide Studies (born 1966)

Jonathan C. Friedman (born 1966) is a history professor and director of Holocaust and Genocide Studies at West Chester University.

== Books ==
- The Lion and the Star: Gentile–Jewish Relations in Three Hessian Communities (1998)
- Rainbow Jews: Gay and Jewish Identity in the Performing Arts (2007)
- (Editor) Routledge History of the Holocaust. (2013)
- Haunted Laughter: Representations of Adolf Hitler, the Third Reich, and the Holocaust in Comedic Film and Television (2022)
