= Antonio Guerra =

Antonio Guerra may refer to:

- Tonino Guerra (1920–2012), Italian poet, writer and screenwriter
- Antonio Guerra (bishop) (died 1500), Roman Catholic prelate
