= Vincent Mantsoe =

South African dancer and choreographer (born 1971)

Vincent Sekwati Koko Mantsoe
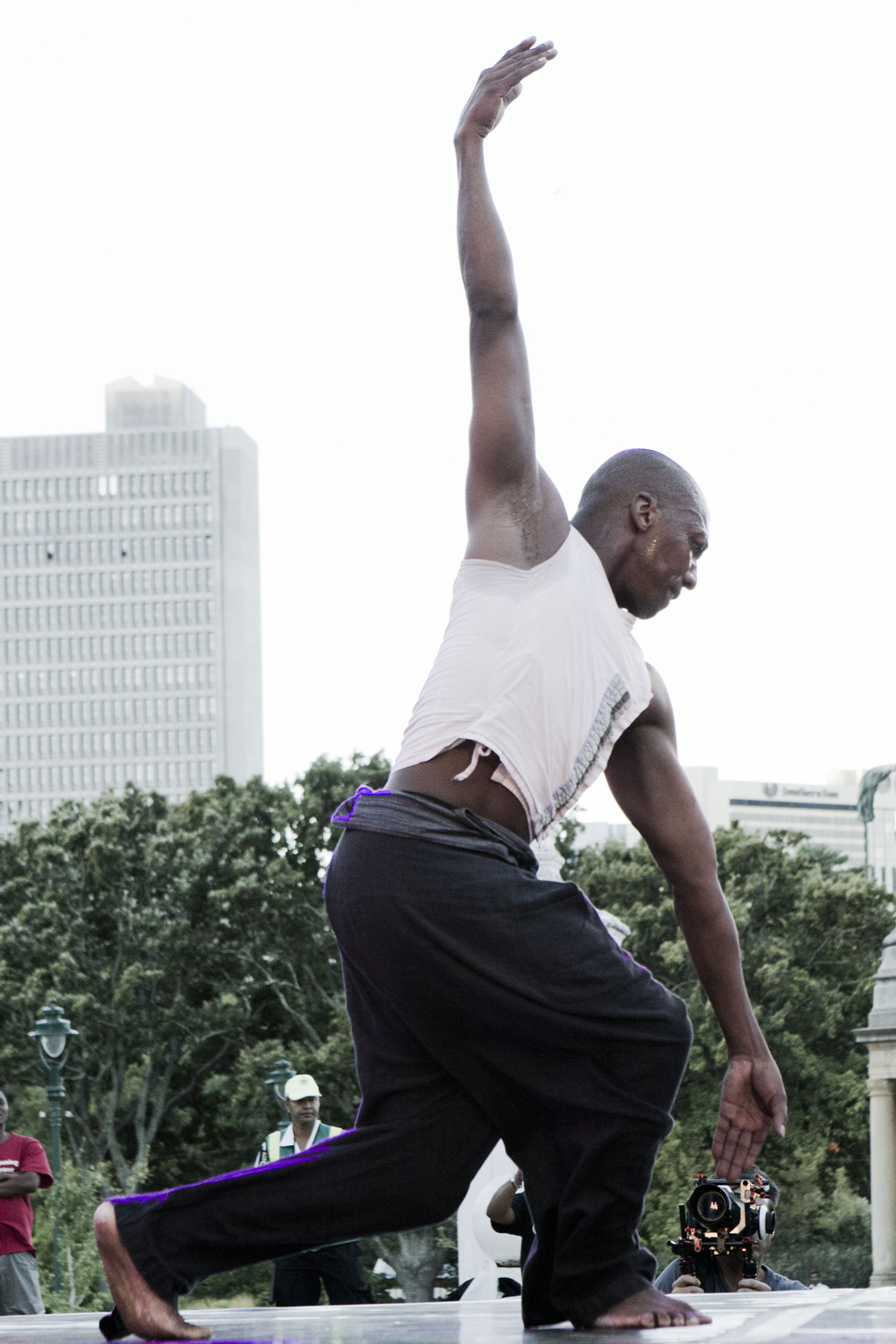
- Mantsoe at Infecting the City in 2012
- Born: 1971 (age 54–55); Soweto, South Africa
- Education: Moving Into Dance Mophatong (MIDM)
- Known for: Dance

Vincent Mantsoe (born 1971) is a South African dancer and choreographer. Raised in the Soweto township outside Johannesburg, he combines the street dance of his childhood with traditional and contemporary dance styles. Spirituality and the cultural influences of African, Aboriginal Australian, Asian, contemporary, and ballet traditions are important influences on Mantsoe's work. He is also the founder of Association Noa.

He developed “KOBA” (bend), a unique training method "where one can swim in a pool of energy within, to transcend the physical limitations of the body." He gives masterclasses around the world in this technique.

“What is key for me is to have respect for every aspect of movement I bring into my work. Dance for me is about living the maximum possibility of the past and the present. When I’m on stage, I’m no longer Vincent Sekwati Koko Mantsoe, I represent something larger. I am the past, carrying my ancestors into the present and into the new generation. Understanding and respecting this knowledge is very important. Without tlhompho le botho ba hao (respect and your humanity), you’re just a body,” Mantsoe says.

== Career ==
=== Education ===
Mantsoe began his training in 1990 with Johannesburg's Moving Into Dance Company.

=== Awards ===
- 1992 IGI Dance Umbrella (South Africa Johannesburg)
- 1995 Standard Bank Young Artist of the Year (South Africa)
- 1996 First Prize at Dance Encounters of Contemporary African Dance (Luanda, Angola)
- 1996 FNB Male Choreographer of the Year (South Africa)
- 1996 Sixth Recontres Choreographiques Internationales awards for Independent Choreographers (France, Paris)
- 1998 Sixth Recontres Choreographiques Internationales awards for Independent Choreographers (France, Paris)
- 1999 FNB VITA awards for Choreographer of the Year and Most Outstanding Performance by a Male Dancer (South Africa)
- 1999 Prix de Peuple, Festival International de Nouvelle Danse (Montreal Canada) –
- 2001 FNB Vita Choreographer of the Year and Best Male (South Africa)
- 2006 FNB Dance Umbrella and Gauteng MEC for Best Choreography and Best Male Dance
- 2007 Black Theatre Alliance Awards for best Choreography in Music and Dance (USA, Chicago)

=== Solo Work ===
- 1992, African Soul
- 1993, Gula `Bird`
- 1997, Mpheyane `Deceit`
- 1998, Phokwane
- 2000, Barena `Chief`
- 2001, Motswa-Hole `Person from far away`
- 2002, Bupiro-Mukiti `Dance of life`
- 2003, NDAA `Greetings`
- 2005, NTU `Nothing`
- 2007, EBHOFOLO `This madness`
- 2009, LEFA (solo work), Introdanse (Netherlands, Arhem)
- 2011, NTU/// Recreation
- 2025, 'Desert Poems' (UJ Arts & Culture, Johannesburg)
