= Medical exploitation of Black women in the United States =

Medical exploitation of Black women in the United States refers to a longstanding pattern of unethical medical practices and systemic abuse disproportionately targeting Black women throughout American history. These practices, often carried out without consent, have contributed to widespread health disparities, reproductive injustices, and a mistrust of the medical system within Black communities.

From the posthumous exploitation of Sarah Baartman—a South African woman whose body was dissected and displayed in 19th-century Europe—to the experimental surgeries performed without anesthesia or consent on enslaved Black women by Dr. James Marion Sims, often called the "father of modern gynecology," and the unauthorized use of Henrietta Lacks' cells in biomedical research, Black women have been repeatedly dehumanized and exploited in the name of science and medicine.

These events are not isolated, but rather part of a broader pattern of medical racism, including medical racism in the United States, that has devalued Black women's lives and bodies. The legacy of this exploitation continues to influence health outcomes, access to care, and institutional trust in the present day.

== Sarah Baartman and the colonial medical gaze ==
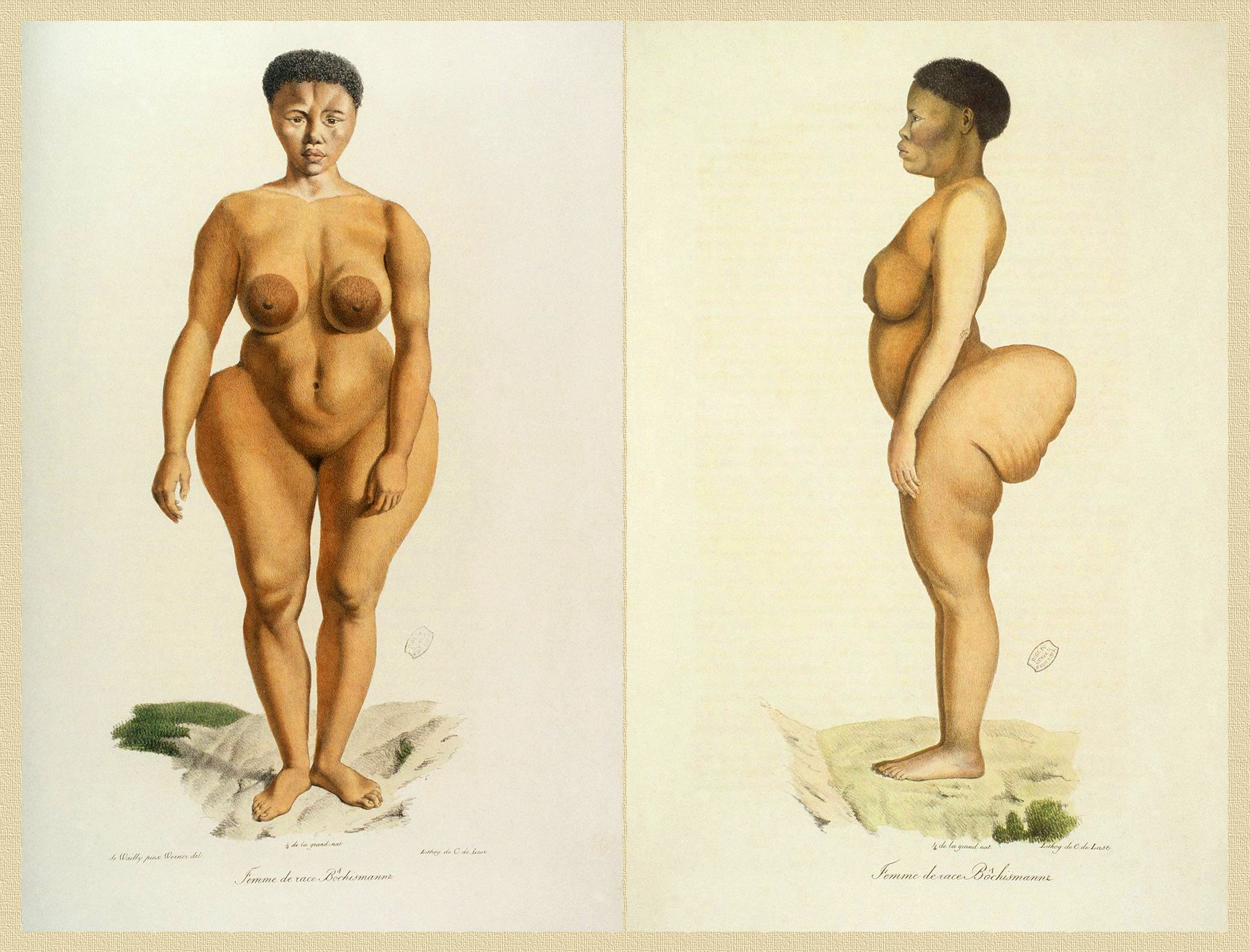
Sawtche, named Sarah "Saartjie" Baartman in Europe (ca.1790 - 1815), called the Hottentot Venus, captured in South Africa, exhibited in Europe as a freak show attraction, forced into prostitution, studied as a specimen of "Woman of race Bôchismann" in 1815 by Étienne Geoffroy Saint-Hilaire and Georges Cuvier.

Sarah Baartman was born on the South African frontier in the 1770s. She spent most of her early life in South Africa before being taken to Europe, where she lived for five years until her death in 1815. During her time in Europe, Baartman's body was exhibited in London and Paris as part of a freak show attraction. She was labeled the "Hottentot Venus" and displayed alongside other so-called human curiosities. Her physical features—particularly her large buttocks—were sensationalized and objectified, becoming the focal point of these exploitative exhibitions.

After she died in 1815, she became subject to scientific inquiry because of her private parts. She was subject to posthumous dissection by French Naturalist Georges Cuvier, who not only violated her body by doing so but also preserved her brain, genitalia, and skeleton, and made a full body cast, which was all displayed in the Musée de l'Homme in Paris. Baartman's body continued to be exploited long after her death, as Julien-Joseph Virey used published images of her to support racist typologies and theories of Black inferiority. He characterized black women as sexually primitive and biologically distinct from white women, citing her anatomy as evidence. These writings and posthumous exploitation of Baartman's body helped reinforce beliefs about the hypersexuality of black women and helped entrench a framework of scientific racism that influenced the medical community for decades.

== J. Marion Sims and the foundations of gynecology ==
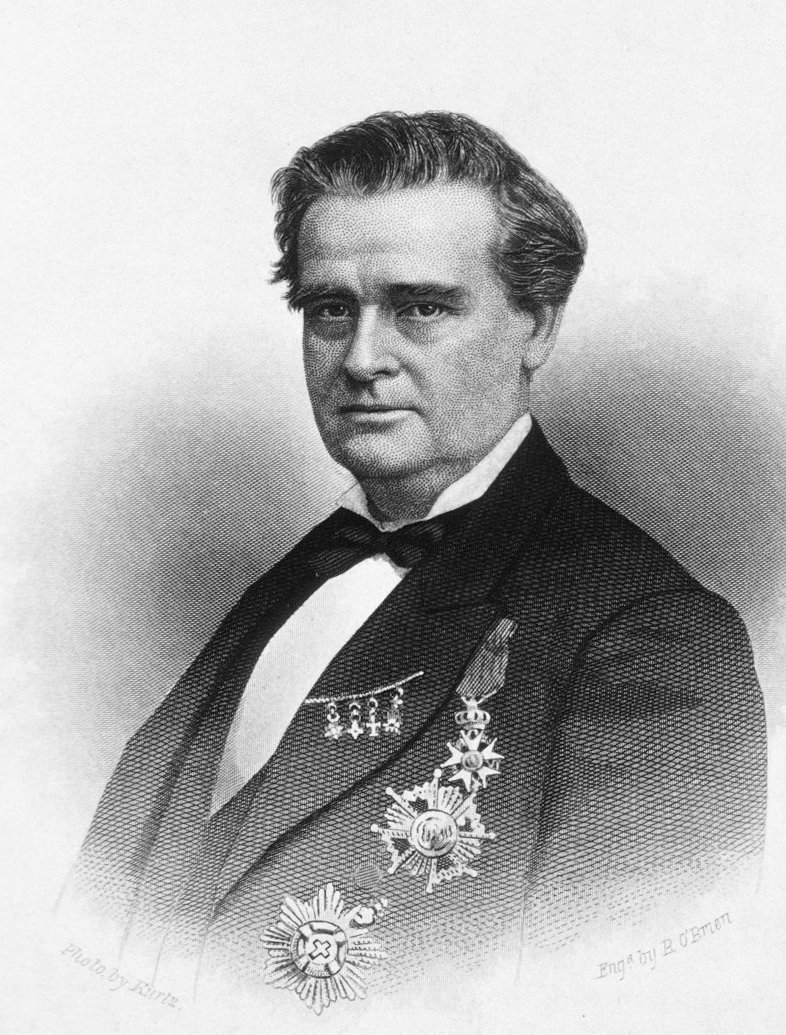
J. Marion Sims (January 25, 1813 – November 13, 1883)

James Marion Sims was an American surgeon in the 1840s. He is regarded as "the father of gynecology," most known for developing a surgical technique to treat vesicovaginal fistulas—a complication of childbirth. However, the development of this procedure was marked by profound ethical violations and immense suffering.

Sims used enslaved African American women brought to him by their slave master as his experimental subjects. Notably, three enslaved women, Anarcha, Lucy, and Betsey, were subjects of his non-consensual experimentation. Sims performed a series of experimental surgeries on these women, often without anesthesia despite its availability at the time. In one instance, an enslaved woman almost died on the table from the pain and humiliation she underwent during the surgery and at the hands of Sims.

At the time, prevailing medical beliefs included the false notion that Black individuals experienced less pain than white individuals, a theory used to justify the absence of anesthesia in these procedures. After standardizing the technique through repeated operations on Black women, Sims began to use anesthesia when treating white patients. His work and methods have since been the subject of extensive ethical and historical analysis regarding consent, medical ethics, and racial disparities in healthcare.

== Henrietta Lacks - Birth of Biomedical Ethics ==
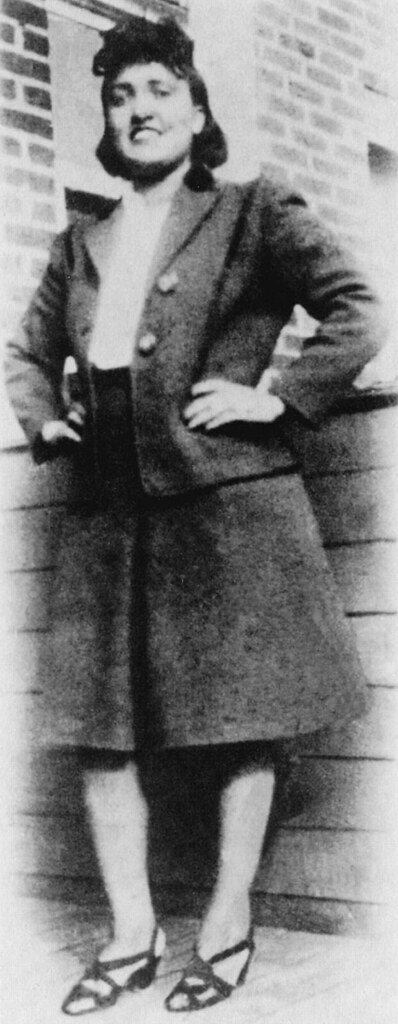
Henrietta Lacks around 1945, before her death from cervical cancer in 1951

Henrietta Lacks was a young mother of five who, in 1951 visited the Johns Hopkins Hospital complaining of vaginal bleeding. Upon examination, Dr. Howard Jones discovered a large malignant tumor on her cervix. A sample of her cancer cells was retrieved in a biopsy and sent to Dr. George Gey's tissue Lab. Gey was a prominent cancer researcher who collected cells from patients. Upon studying the sample, Gey discovered that Lacks' cells were unique in that they could survive and replicate indefinitely outside the human body. These cells were subsequently used to create the HeLa cell line - the first immortal cell line, which has contributed to numerous scientific breakthroughs today. Despite the significant contributions of HeLa cells to biomedical science, neither Lacks nor her family were informed of the use of her cells at the time, nor were they compensated.

Today, thanks to HeLa cells, researchers have gained insights into cancerous genes, herpes, leukemia, influenza, hemophilia, Parkinson's disease, sexually transmitted infections, and human longevity. The HeLa cell line has contributed to some of the most significant medical breakthroughs, including the development of the polio vaccine, chemotherapy, gene mapping, cloning, genetic research, and in vitro fertilization. The HeLa cell line has had a profound and lasting impact on biomedical science, and it continues to be a foundational tool in research today. However, it was not until 2023—more than 70 years after her cells were first used—that members of Lacks' family reached a legal settlement acknowledging her involuntary contribution. This resolution marked a significant, though long overdue, step toward addressing the ethical injustices surrounding the use of her cells and recognizing the legacy she left behind.

== Legacy and Lasting Implications ==
The historical medical exploitation of Black women in the United States has left a lasting impact on both the medical field and Black communities. As exemplified by cases of Sarah Baartman, J. Marion Sims, and Henrietta Lacks, Black women have been forced to take part in brutal trials and unethical experiments in the name of medicine. This legacy has contributed significantly to the persistent mistrust of medical institutions among many Black Americans, particularly Black women, and helps explain disparities in healthcare access, treatment, and outcomes that persist today. For example, studies show that Black women are more likely to report feeling dismissed by healthcare providers and are disproportionately affected by maternal mortality and under-treatment for pain issues rooted in long-standing racial myths, such as the false belief that Black people feel less pain than others.
