= Sarah Baartman =

Khoikhoi woman (c. 1789–1815)

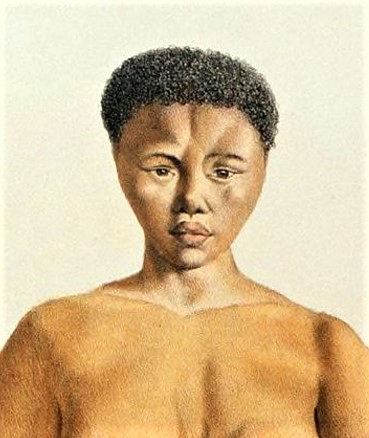
- Born: Ssehura? c. 1789; Gamtoos Valley, Eastern Cape, Dutch Cape Colony
- Died: 29 December 1815 (aged 26); Paris, France
- Resting place: Vergaderingskop, Hankey, Eastern Cape, South Africa; 33.8372°S 24.8848°E
- Other names: Hottentot Venus, Saartjie Baartman
- Citizenship: Cape Colony (now South Africa) – under Dutch/British colonial rule
- Education: No formal education recorded
- Occupations: Slave, exhibited performer ("freak show" displays in Europe)

Sarah Baartman (Afrikaans: [ˈsɑːra ˈbɑːrtman]; c. 1789 – 29 December 1815), also spelled Sara, sometimes in the Dutch diminutive form Saartje (Afrikaans: [ˈsɑːrki]), or Saartjie, and Bartman, Bartmann, was a Khoekhoe woman who was exhibited as a freak show attraction in 19th-century Europe under the name Hottentot Venus, a name that was later attributed to at least one other woman similarly exhibited.

The women were exhibited for their steatopygic body type – uncommon in Northwestern Europe – that was perceived as a curiosity at that time, and became subject of scientific interest as well as of erotic projection.

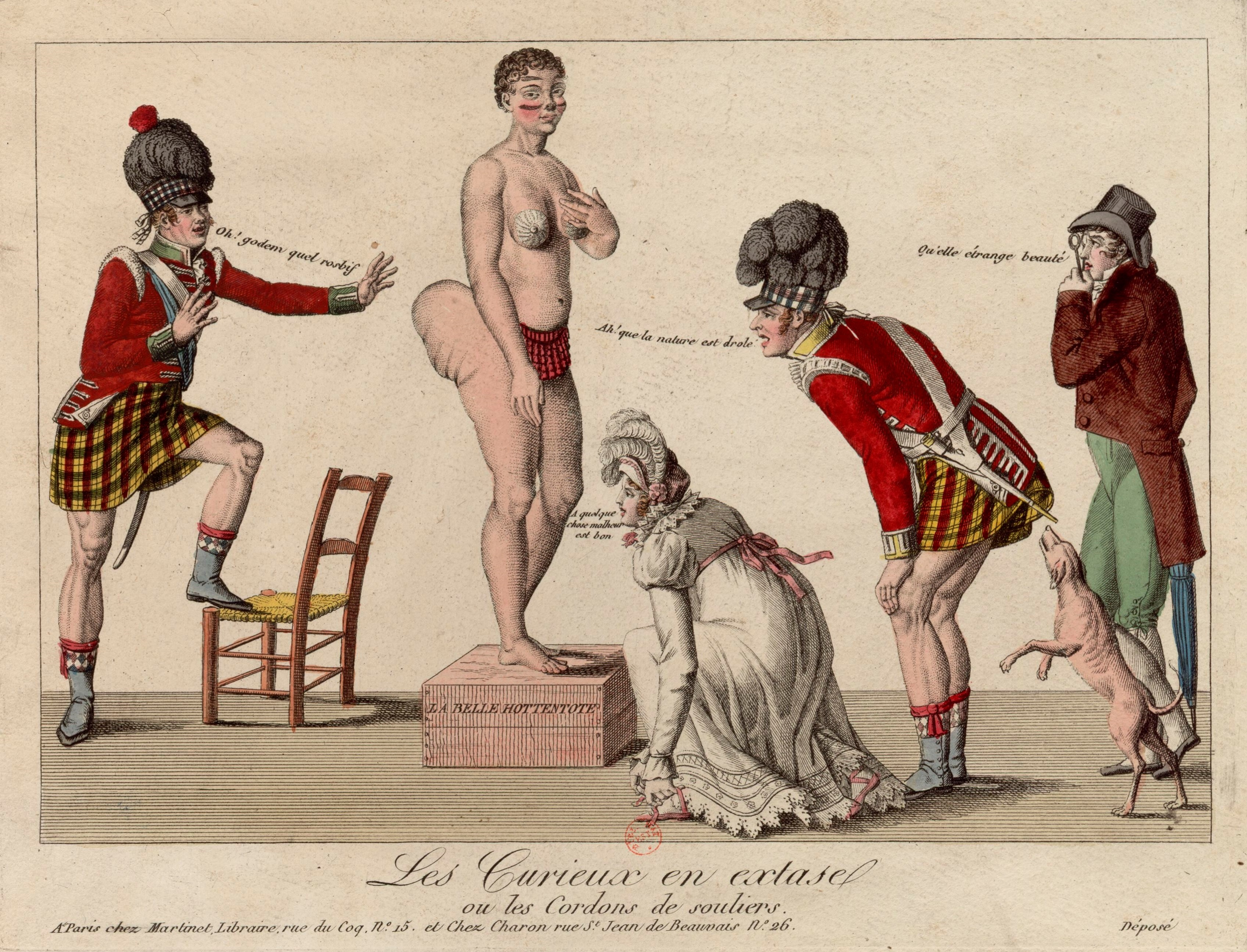
La Belle Hottentote, a 19th-century French print of Baartman

"Venus" is sometimes used to designate representations of the female body in arts and cultural anthropology, referring to the Roman goddess of love and fertility. "Hottentot" was a Dutch-colonial era term for the indigenous Khoikhoi people of southwestern Africa, which then became commonly used in English, and was shortened to "hotnot" as an offensive term; the term "Hottentot" refers to the tribe, like the Zulu or Xhosa. The Sarah Baartman story has been called the epitome of racist colonial exploitation, and of the commodification and dehumanization of Southern African people.

== Name and identity ==
No contemporary record of Baartman's original Khoekhoe name survives. Some writers have suggested that it may have been Ssehura, but this identification remains unconfirmed.

The name by which she is now best known, Sarah Baartman, was acquired during her lifetime in the Cape Colony (now part of South Africa). Historical records refer to her by several names, including Sara Baartman, Saartje Baartman, Saartjie Baartman, Bartman, and Bartmann. Saartje and Saartjie are Dutch diminutive forms of Sarah. In Cape Dutch, diminutives commonly indicated familiarity, endearment, or contempt.

During her public exhibitions in Britain from 1810 and later in France, she became widely known as the Hottentot Venus. The term Hottentot was a colonial-era name used for the Khoekhoe people of southern Africa and is now generally regarded as offensive. Venus referred to the Roman goddess Venus and was commonly used in titles associated with representations of female beauty. The name was created and promoted by her exhibitors rather than by Baartman herself.

== Life ==
=== Early life in the Cape Colony ===
Sara Baartman, a woman of KhoeSan descent, was born in 1789 near the Gamtoos River, in what is now the Eastern Cape region of South Africa.

Baartman spent her childhood and teenage years on Dutch European farms. She went through puberty rites and kept a small tortoiseshell necklace, most likely her mother's, until her death in France.

Around the age of 10, while working on the farm of Peter Cezar in Cape Town, she was seen by Hendrik Cezar (Peter’s brother) and Alexander Dunlop, an English ship’s surgeon, who were perversly impressed by features of her prepubescent anatomy. She lived in Cape Town for at least two years, working in households as a washerwoman and a nursemaid, first for Peter Cesars, then in the house of a Dutch man in Cape Town. She finally moved to be a wet-nurse in the household of Peter Cesars' brother, Hendrik Cesars, outside Cape Town in present-day Woodstock.

Around 1810, Hendrik took Baartman to England with him and Dunlop to exhibit her in public. She went from Cape Town to England and was exhibited in London as the "Hottentot Venus", in degrading conditions to satisfy European curiosity about KhoeSan women’s bodies and ongoing racial science-based speculation about ethnicities. Her captors always profited from these exhibits.

Being the property of these two individuals, she was subjected to assault consistently on a whim due to their fascination with her body. There is evidence that she had two children, though both died as babies.

She had a relationship with a poor Dutch soldier, Hendrik van Jong, who lived in Hout Bay near Cape Town, but the relationship ended when his regiment left the Cape.

=== First exhibitions ===
In exchange for cash, Hendrik Cesars began to show her at the city hospital, where surgeon Alexander Dunlop worked. Dunlop, (sometimes wrongly cited as William Dunlop), a Scottish military surgeon in the Cape slave lodge, operated a side business in supplying animal specimens to showmen in Britain, and he suggested she travel to Europe to make money by exhibiting herself. Baartman refused. Dunlop persisted, and Baartman said she would not go unless Hendrik Cesars came too. In 1810 he agreed to go to Britain to make money by putting Baartman on stage. It is unknown whether Baartman went willingly or was forced.

Dunlop was the frontman and driver of the plan to exhibit Baartman. According to a British legal report of 26 November 1810, an affidavit supplied to the Court of King's Bench from a "Mr. Bullock of Liverpool Museum" stated: "some months since a Mr. Alexander Dunlop, who, he believed, was a surgeon in the army, came to him to sell the skin of a Camelopard, which he had brought from the Cape of Good Hope. . . . Some time after, Mr. Dunlop again called on Mr. Bullock, and told him, that he had then on her way from the Cape, a female Hottentot, of very singular appearance; that she would make the fortune of any person who shewed her in London, and that he (Dunlop) was under an engagement to send her back in two years. . . ." Lord Caledon, governor of the Cape, gave permission for the trip, but later said he regretted it after he fully learned the purpose of the trip.

=== On display in Europe ===
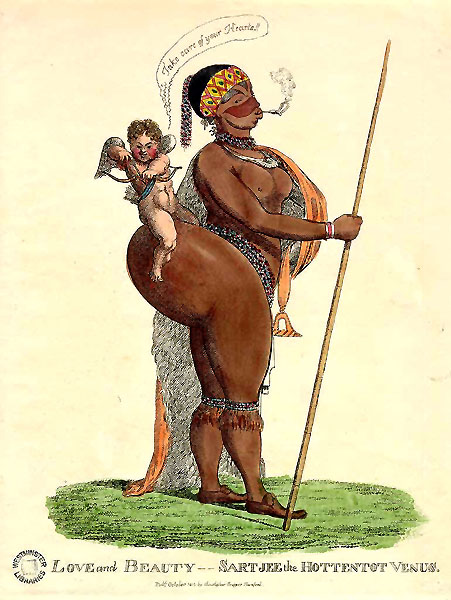
A caricature of Baartman drawn in the early 19th century

Baartman's exhibition poster in London

Hendrik Cesars and Alexander Dunlop brought Baartman to London in 1810. The group lived together in Duke Street, St. James, the most expensive part of London. In the household were Sarah Baartman, Hendrik Cesars, Alexander Dunlop, and two African boys, possibly brought illegally by Dunlop from the slave lodge in Cape Town.

Dunlop had to have Baartman exhibited, and Cesars was the showman. Dunlop exhibited Baartman at the Egyptian Room at the London residence of Thomas Hope at No. 10 Duchess Street, Cavendish Square, London. Dunlop thought he could make money because of Londoners' lack of familiarity with Africans and because of Baartman's large buttocks, which was viewed as variously grotesque, lascivious, and obscene.

A handwritten note made on an exhibition flyer by someone who saw Baartman in London in January 1811 indicates curiosity about her origins and probably reproduced some of the language from the exhibition; thus the following origin story should be treated with skepticism: "Sartjee is 22 Years old is 4 feet 10 Inches high, and has (for a Hottentot) a good capacity. She lived in the occupation of a Cook at the Cape of Good Hope. Her Country is situated not less than 600 Miles from the Cape, the Inhabitants of which are rich in Cattle and sell them by barter for a mere trifle. A Bottle of Brandy, or small roll of Tobacco will purchase several Sheep – Their principal trade is in Cattle Skins or Tallow. – Beyond this Nation is an other, of small stature, very subtle & fierce; the Dutch could not bring them under subjection, and shot them whenever they found them. 9 Jany, 1811. [H.C.?]"

The tradition of freak shows was well established in Europe at this time, and historians have argued that this is at first how Baartman was displayed. Baartman never allowed herself to be exhibited nude, and an account of her appearance in London in 1810 makes it clear that she was wearing a garment, albeit a tight-fitting one. She became a subject of scientific interest, albeit of racist bias frequently, as well as of erotic projection. She was marketed as the "missing link between man and beast".

=== Public reception ===
Her exhibition in London just a few years after the passing of the 1807 Slave Trade Act, which abolished the slave trade, created a scandal. A British abolitionist society, the African Association, conducted a newspaper campaign for her release. The British abolitionist Zachary Macaulay led the protest, with Hendrik Cesars protesting in response that Baartman was entitled to earn her living, stating: "has she not as good a right to exhibit herself as an Irish Giant or a Dwarf?"

Cesars was comparing Baartman to the contemporary Irish giants Charles Byrne and Patrick Cotter O'Brien. Macaulay and The African Association took the matter to court and on 24 November 1810 at the Court of King's Bench the Attorney-General began the attempt "to give her liberty to say whether she was exhibited by her own consent." In support he produced two affidavits in court. The first, from William Bullock of Liverpool Museum, was intended to show that Baartman had been brought to Britain by people who referred to her as if she were property. The second, by the Secretary of the African Association, described the degrading conditions under which she was exhibited and also gave evidence of coercion. Baartman was then questioned before an attorney in Dutch, in which she was fluent, via interpreters

In 1810, the African Association in London took Cezar and Dunlop to court, citing Sara’s degradation and ill-treatment. Sara provided testimony in a three-hour interview conducted in Dutch. The Case of the Hottentot Venus was heard on 24 and 28 November 1810. She reportedly stated that she had agreed of her own free will to come to England for six years and that she was under no restraint. On her evidence, the case was dismissed. After the court case, Sara disappeared from the public gaze in London.

=== Touring Britain and Ireland ===
The publicity given by the court case increased Baartman's popularity as an exhibit. She later toured other parts of England and was exhibited at a fair in Limerick, Ireland in 1812. She also was exhibited at a fair at Bury St Edmunds in Suffolk. On 1 December 1811 Baartman was baptised at Manchester Cathedral and there is evidence that she got married on the same day.

=== Exhibition in France ===
A man called Henry Taylor took Baartman to France around September 1814. Taylor then sold her to a man sometimes reported as an animal trainer, S. Réaux, but whose name was actually Jean Riaux and belonged to a ballet master who had been deported from the Cape Colony for seditious behaviour. Riaux exhibited her under more pressured conditions for 15 months at the Palais Royal in Paris. In France she may have been in effect enslaved.

She was brought out as an exhibit at wealthy people's parties and private salons. In Paris, Baartman's promoters did not need to concern themselves with slavery charges. Crais and Scully state: "By the time she got to Paris, her existence was really quite miserable and extraordinarily poor". She was sometimes exhibited with a collar around her neck. At the end of her life she was penniless, which was probably connected to the economic depression in France after Napoleon's defeat, resulting in a dearth of audiences that were able and willing to pay to see her. According to present-day accounts in the New York Times and The Independent, she was also working as a prostitute, but the biography by Crais and Scully only notes that as an uncertain possibility (since she was exhibited, besides other places, at the brothel in Cours des Fontaines).

== Death ==
Not much is known about Sara’s life between 1811 and 1813. In 1814, she was taken to Paris by Hendrik Cezar and sold to an animal trainer. She gained the attention of French savants, including Georges Cuvier, who arranged for her to be examined at the Jardin du Roi in March 1815. Sara Baartman died on 1 January 1816, at the probable age of 26. Georges Cuvier made a plaster cast of her body, removed her skeleton, and extracted her brain and genitals, which he pickled and displayed in bottles at the Musée de l’Homme in Paris.

== Display of remains after death ==
Saint-Hilaire applied on behalf of the Muséum d'Histoire Naturelle to retain her remains (Cuvier had preserved her brain, genitalia and skeleton), on the grounds that it was of a singular specimen of humanity and therefore of special scientific interest. The application was approved and Baartman's skeleton and body cast were displayed in Muséum d'histoire naturelle d'Angers. Her skull was stolen in 1827 but returned a few months later.

The restored skeleton and skull continued to arouse the interest of visitors until the remains were moved to the Musée de l'Homme when it was founded in 1937 and remained on display until the mid-1970s. Her body cast and skeleton stood side by side and faced away from the viewer, emphasising her steatopygia (accumulation of fat on the buttocks) while reinforcing that aspect as the primary interest of her body. The Baartman exhibit proved popular until it elicited complaints for being a degrading representation of women. The skeleton was removed in 1974, and the body cast in 1976.

== Repatriation ==
After her death in 1816, Baartman's remains remained in France for nearly 200 years. Beginning in the 1940s, there were periodic calls for their return to South Africa. The case gained worldwide prominence in the 1980s after American paleontologist Stephen Jay Gould wrote The Mismeasure of Man. Mansell Upham, a researcher and jurist specializing in colonial South African history, also helped spur the movement to bring Baartman's remains back to South Africa.

KhoeSan representatives and their supporters also launched a public campaign calling for Baartman’s remains to be returned to South Africa for burial. The campaign received coverage in South African and international media and subsequently brought the issue to the attention of the South African Government. Following the victory of the African National Congress in the 1994 South African general election, President Nelson Mandela responding to demands from representatives of the Khoisan group formally requested that France return Baartman's remains. In response, French President François Mitterrand made a personal promise to Mandela to return her remains.

In 1995 the Griqua National Conference formally wrote to the French Embassy in South Africa demanding the return of Sara Baartman’s remains from France for burial in South Africa invoking the Universal Declaration of Human Rights and the Draft Declaration on the Rights of Indigenous People. The organisation’s campaign formed part of wider KhoeSan efforts to secure her repatriation. The request was not acknowledged by the Embassy.

In 1996 the South Africa Deputy Minister of Arts, Culture, Science and Technology Brigitte Mabandla, commissioned a Reference Group led by palaeoanthropologist Professor Phillip Tobias. The group brought together KhoeSan representatives, activists, government officials, academics and human-rights and gender-rights representatives to advise on the cultural, legal, diplomatic, human-rights and burial considerations surrounding Baartman’s repatriation.

South African Ministers for Foreign Affairs and Arts, Culture, Science and Technology formally raised Baartman’s repatriation with French Minister of Cooperation Jacques Godfrain during his visit to South Africa. France and South Africa agreed that Henri de Lumley and Professor Phillip Tobias would examine the case, but the discussions did not produce an agreement on her return. Major conferences on KhoeSan studies were held in Germany and South Africa, addressing questions of language, identity, lineage and land. The South African conference placed greater emphasis on the participation of KhoeSan people themselves, contributing to broader discussions about KhoeSan identity, heritage and perspectives relevant to the repatriation of Baartman.

Alongside diplomatic negotiations and political campaigns, writers, filmmakers and visual artists contributed to public discussion of Sara Baartman's life, treatment and the campaign for the return of her remains. In 1998, South African poet Diana Ferrus, herself of Khoekhoe descent while studying at the Utrecht University, wrote the poem I've Come to Take You Home as a poetic tribute to Baartman, this played a pivotal role in spurring the movement to bring Baartman's remains back to South Africa.

The poem later came to the attention of French senator Nicolas About, who contacted Ferrus and received permission to use a French translation in support of the parliamentary bill to secure Baartman's return. Zola Maseko's documentary The Life and Times of Sara Baartman - "The Hottentot Venus", also explored the historical, social and racial ideas surrounding Baartman's representation. These cultural interventions occurred alongside campaigns by KhoeSan and Griqua representatives and efforts by the South African government to obtain Baartman's remains through diplomatic channels.

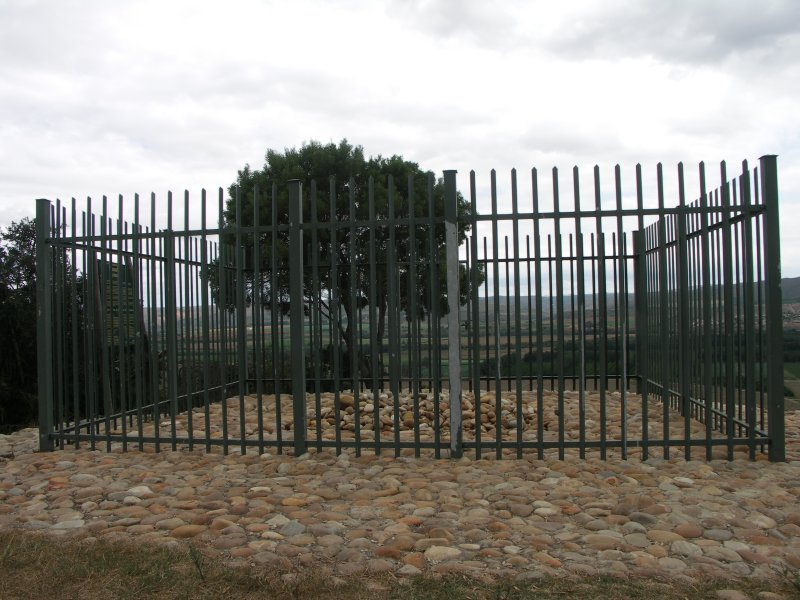
Sarah Baartman's grave, on a hill overlooking Hankey in the Gamtoos River Valley, Eastern Cape, South Africa

France did not immediately agree to Mandela's request. Years of legal negotiations and debate followed in the French National Assembly. During those discussions, the assistant curator of the Musée de l'Homme, Philippe Mennecier, argued against returning the remains, stating: "We never know what science will be able to tell us in the future. If she is buried, this chance will be lost ... for us she remains a very important treasure." According to historian Sadiah Qureshi, Mennecier's statement reflected the continued treatment of Baartman's body as a cultural artifact rather than as the remains of an individual.

Before her repatriation, Sara Baartman’s skeletal and soft-tissue remains, and body cast were preserved and displayed at the Musée de l'Homme in Paris, France, from 1816 until 1974. From 1974 – 2002, her reconstructed skeleton and soft-tissue remains were held in the storeroom of the National Museum of Natural History in Paris, France.

=== Sarah Baartman Center of Remembrance ===
Sara Baartman’s skeletal remains and soft tissue were buried in her birthplace of Gamtoos River Valley, in Hankey, in the Eastern Cape Province of South Africa in 2002. Her burial site, which has affectionately been named "Saartjie Baartman Memorial", has been declared a National heritage site. It is accessible to the general public, and to the community into which she was born.

Following her repatriation and burial, the South African government committed to a long-term development of the Sarah Baartman Centre of Remembrance. This initiative sought to honour her and to restore the dignity of the KhoeSan communities and their descendants. Announced in 2009 by the department of Arts and Culture, the project was intended to commemorate with Baartman's life, education and future generations about her experiences and preserve the heritage and cultural history of Khoekhoe and San peoples. The center was planned as part of the national Khoisan heritage route and envisioned as a culture and heritage tourist destination.

The costs of this project have reportedly escalated from an initial R161 million to over R221 million. This, along with the costs the new democratic government incurred in preparing, negotiating and implementing her return and burial (approximately R10 350 000), speaks to the financial implications of restitution that African States largely bear.

== Scientific examination and racial science ==
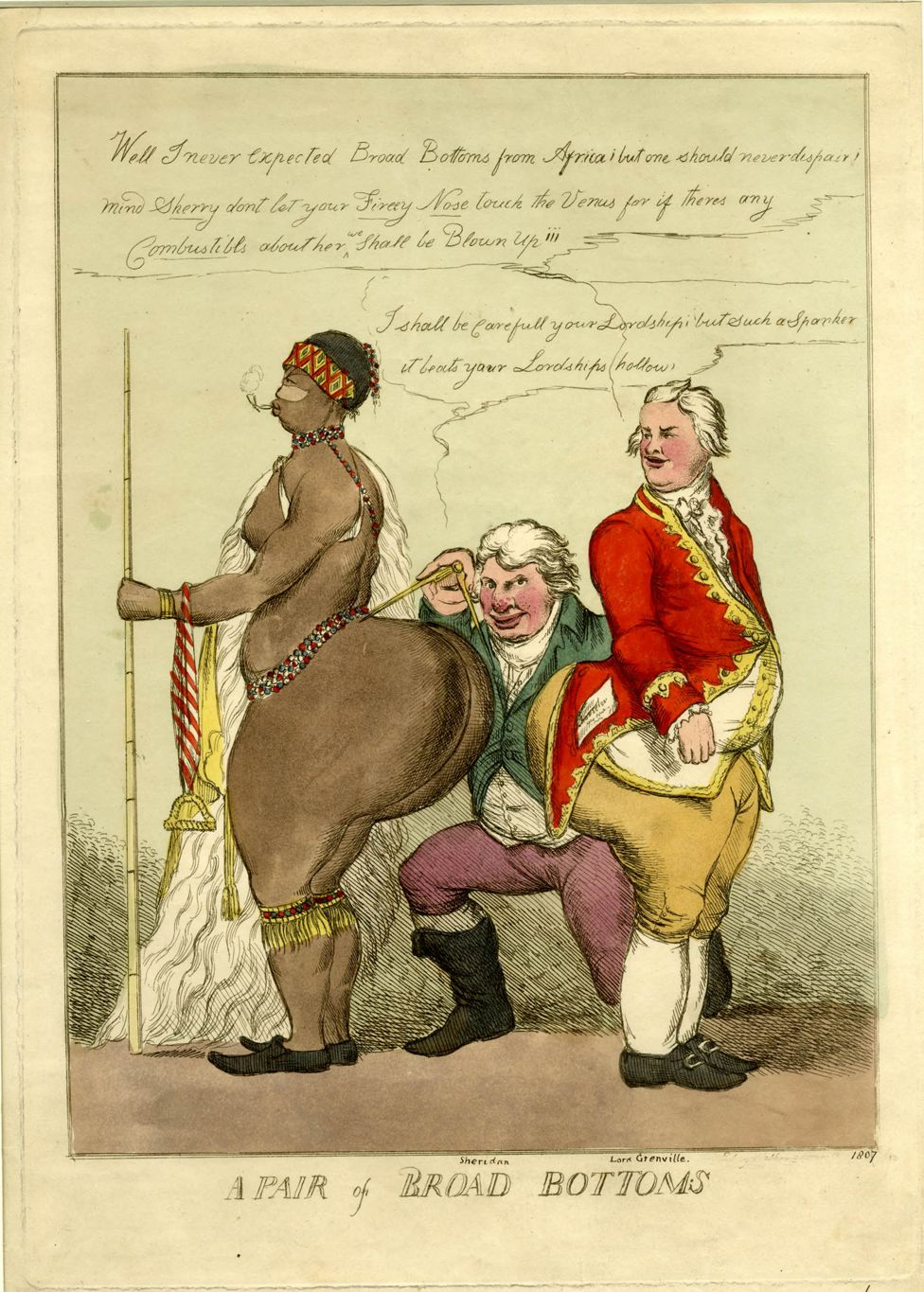
Caricature of Baartman by William Heath (1810)

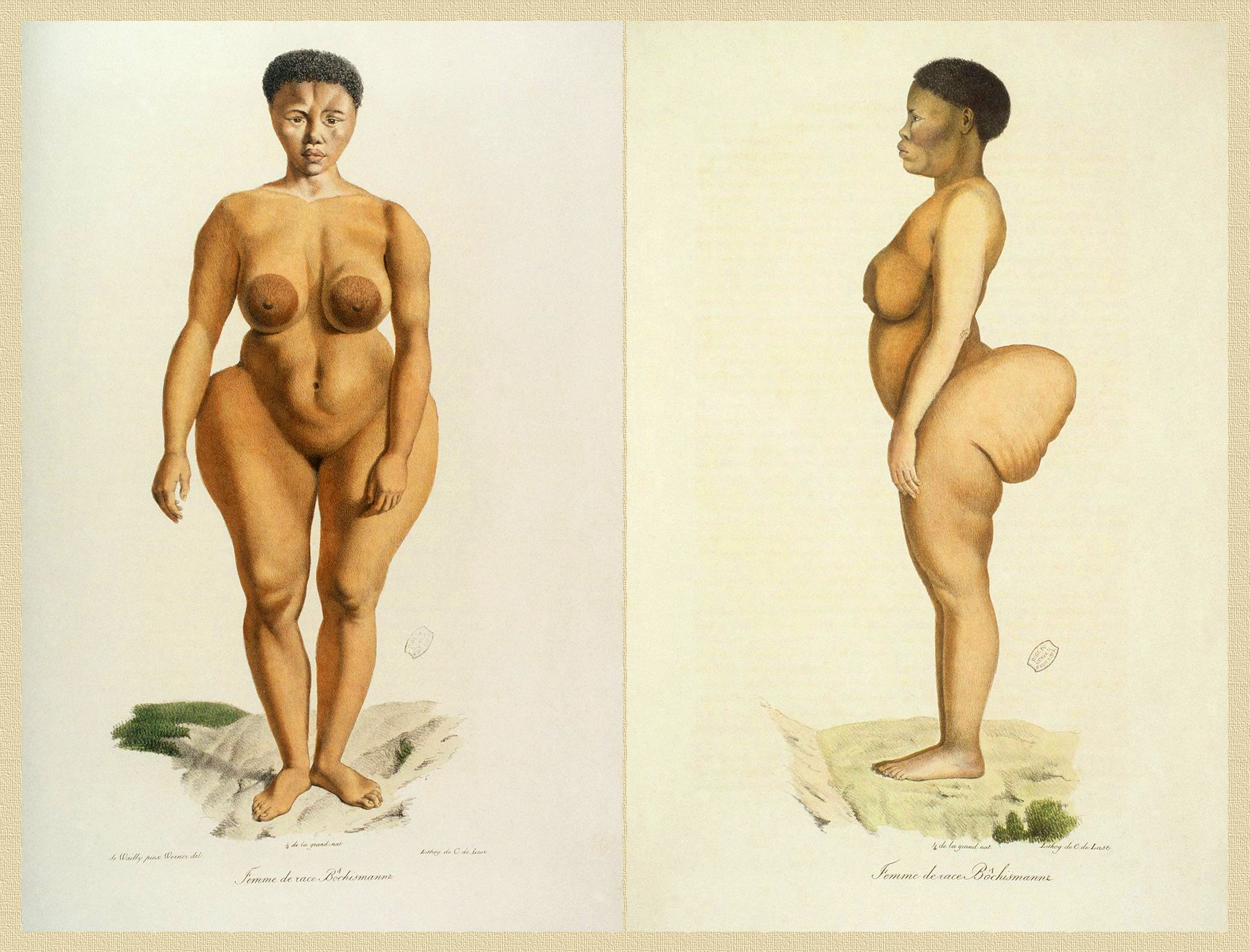
Image from Volume 2 of Natural History of Mammals (1819)

During Baartman's final years in Paris, her public exhibition became increasingly entangled with scientific racism. French scientists were particularly interested in whether she possessed elongated labia, a feature that French explorer and naturalist François Levaillant had previously claimed to have observed among Khoekhoe women at the Cape. In March 1815, Georges Cuvier, head keeper of the menagerie at the Muséum national d'Histoire naturelle and a founder of comparative anatomy, and other French naturalists examined Baartman at the Jardin du Roi, where she also became the subject of several scientific paintings.

After Baartman's death, Cuvier conducted a dissection of her body, although he did not perform an autopsy to determine the cause of death. The French anatomist Henri Marie Ducrotay de Blainville published notes on the dissection in 1816, which were republished by Cuvier in the Mémoires du Muséum d'Histoire Naturelle a year later in 1817.

In his published account, Cuvier described Baartman as an intelligent woman with an excellent memory, particularly for faces. In addition to her native tongue, she spoke fluent Dutch, passable English, and a smattering of French. He wrote that she was adept at playing the Jew's harp, could dance according to the traditions of her country, and had a lively personality. He described her shoulders and back as "graceful", her arms as slender, and her hands and feet as "charming" and "pretty".

Despite these observations, Cuvier interpreted her remains as evidencing ape-like traits. He thought her small ears were similar to those of an orangutan and also compared her vivacity, when alive, to the quickness of a monkey. He was part of a movement of scientists who sought to identify and study differences between human races, with the aim of theorising a racial hierarchy.

Julien-Joseph Virey used Baartman's published image in his essay Dictionnaire des sciences médicales ("Dictionary of Medical Sciences") to support theories about racial difference and female sexuality. Virey focused on identifying her sexual organs as more developed and distinct in comparison to those of white women. His theories regarding sexual primitivism were influenced by the anatomical studies and illustrations of Baartman produced by Cuvier.

It has been suggested by anthropologists that Baartman's body type was once more widespread in humans, based on carvings of female forms dating to the Paleolithic era which are collectively known as Venus figurines, also referred to as "Steatopygian Venuses".

== Symbolism ==
Sarah Baartman was not the only Khoekhoe to be taken from her homeland. Her story is sometimes used to illustrate social and political strains, and through this, some facts have been lost. Dr. Yvette Abrahams, professor of women and gender studies at the University of the Western Cape, writes, "We lack academic studies that view Sarah Baartman as anything other than a symbol. Her story becomes marginalized, as it is always used to illustrate some other topic." Baartman is used to represent African discrimination and suffering in the West although there were many other Khoekhoe people who were taken to Europe. Historian Neil Parsons writes of two Khoekhoe children, 13 and six years old, who were taken from South Africa and displayed at a holiday fair in Elberfeld, Prussia, in 1845. Bosjemans, a travelling show including two Khoekhoe men, women, and a baby, toured Britain, Ireland, and France from 1846 to 1855. P. T. Barnum's show "Little People" advertised a 16-year-old Khoekhoe girl named Flora as the "missing link" and acquired six more Khoekhoe children later.

Baartman's tale may be better known because she was the first Khoekhoe taken from her homeland, or because of the extensive exploitation and examination of her body by scientists such as Georges Cuvier, an anatomist, and the public as well as the mistreatment she received during and after her lifetime. She was brought to the West for her "exaggerated" female form, and the European public developed an obsession with her reproductive organs. Her body parts were on display at the Musée de l'Homme for 150 years, sparking awareness and sympathy in the public eye. Although Baartman was the first Khoekhoe to land in Europe, much of her story has been lost, and she is defined by her exploitation in the West.

== Colonialism ==
Much speculation and study about colonialist influence relates to Baartman's name and social status, her illustrated and performed presentation as the "Hottentot Venus", although considered an extremely offensive term, and the negotiation for her body's return to her homeland. These components and events in Baartman's life have been used by activists and theorists to determine the ways in which 19th-century European colonists exercised control and authority over Khoekhoe people and simultaneously crafted racist and sexist ideologies about their culture. In addition to this, recent scholars have begun to analyze the surrounding events leading up to Baartman's return to her homeland and conclude that it is an expression of recent contemporary post-colonial objectives.

In Janet Shibamoto's review of Deborah Cameron's book Feminism and Linguistic Theory, Shibamoto discusses Cameron's study on the patriarchal context within language, which consequentially influences the way in which women continue to be contained by or subject to ideologies created by the patriarchy. Many scholars have presented information on how Baartman's life was heavily controlled and manipulated by colonialist and patriarchal language.

Baartman grew up on a farm. There is no historical documentation of her birth name. She was given the Dutch name "Saartjie" by Dutch colonists who occupied the land she lived on during her childhood. According to Clifton Crais and Pamela Scully:

Her first name is the Cape Dutch form for "Sara" that marked her as a colonist's servant. "Saartje", the diminutive, was also often a sign of affection. Encoded in her first name were the tensions of affection and exploitation. Her surname literally means "bearded man" in Dutch. It also means uncivilized, uncouth, barbarous, savage. Saartje Baartman – the savage servant.

Dutch colonisers also bestowed the term "Hottentot", which is derived from "hot" and "tot", Dutch approximations of common sounds in the Khoekhoe language. The Dutch used this word when referencing Khoekhoe people because of the clicking sounds and staccato pronunciations that characterise the Khoekhoe language; these components of the Khoekhoe language were considered strange and "bestial" by Dutch colonisers. The term was used until the late 20th century, at which point most people understood its effect as a derogatory term.

Travelogues that circulated in Europe would describe Africa as being "uncivilised" and lacking regard for religious virtue. Travelogues and imagery depicting Black women as "sexually primitive" and "savage" enforced the belief that it was in Africa's best interest to be colonised by European settlers. Cultural and religious conversion was considered to be an altruistic act with imperialist undertones; colonisers believed that they were reforming and correcting Khoekhoe culture in the name of Christianity and the empire. Scholarly arguments discuss how Baartman's body became a symbolic depiction of "all African women" as "fierce, savage, naked, and untamable" and became a crucial role in colonising parts of Africa and shaping narratives.

== Feminist reception ==
=== Traditional iconography of Sarah Baartman and feminist contemporary art ===
Many African female diasporic artists have criticised the traditional iconography of Baartman. According to the studies of contemporary feminists, traditional iconography and historical illustrations of Baartman are effective in revealing the ideological representation of black women in art throughout history. Such studies assess how the traditional iconography of the black female body was institutionally and scientifically defined in the 19th century.

Renee Cox, Renée Green, Joyce Scott, Lorna Simpson, Carrie Mae Weems and Deborah Willis are artists who seek to investigate contemporary social and cultural issues that still surround the African female body. Sander Gilman, a cultural and literary historian states: "While many groups of African Blacks were known to Europeans in the 19th century, the Hottentot remained representative of the essence of the Black, especially the Black female. Both concepts fulfilled the iconographic function in the perception and representation of the world." His article "Black Bodies, White Bodies: Toward an Iconography of Female Sexuality in the Late Nineteenth Century Art, Medicine and Literature" traces art historical records of black women in European art, and also proves that the association of black women with concupiscence within art history has been illustrated consistently since the beginning of the Middle Ages.

Lyle Ashton Harris and Renee Valerie Cox worked in collaboration to produce the photographic piece Hottentot Venus 2000. In this piece, Harris photographs Victoria Cox who presents herself as Baartman while wearing large, sculptural, gilded metal breasts and buttocks attached to her body.

"Permitted" is an installation piece created by Renée Green inspired by Sarah Baartman. Green created a specific viewing arrangement to investigate the European perception of the black female body as "exotic", "bizarre" and "monstrous". Viewers were prompted to step onto the installed platform which was meant to evoke a stage, where Baartman may have been exhibited. Green recreates the basic setting of Baartman's exhibition. At the centre of the platform, which there is a large image of Baartman, and wooden rulers or slats with an engraved caption by Francis Galton encouraging viewers to measure Baartman's buttocks. In the installation there is also a peephole that allows viewers to see an image of Baartman standing on a crate. According to Willis, the implication of the peephole, demonstrates how ethnographic imagery of the black female form in the 19th century functioned as a form of pornography for Europeans present at Baartman's exhibit.

In her film Reassemblage: From the firelight to the screen, Trinh T. Minh-ha comments on the ethnocentric bias that the coloniser's eye applies to the naked female form, arguing that this bias causes the nude female body to be seen as inherently sexually provocative, promiscuous and pornographic within the context of European or western culture. Feminist artists are interested in re-representing Baartman's image, and work to highlight the stereotypes and ethnocentric bias surrounding the black female body based on art historical representations and iconography that occurred before, after and during Baartman's lifetime.

=== Media representation and feminist criticism ===
In November 2014, Paper Magazine released a cover of Kim Kardashian in which she was illustrated as balancing a champagne glass on her extended rear. The cover received much criticism for endorsing "the exploitation and fetishism of the black female body". The similarities with the way in which Baartman was represented as the "Hottentot Venus" during the 19th century have prompted much criticism and commentary.

According to writer Geneva S. Thomas, anyone who is aware of black women's history under colonialist influence would consequentially be aware that Kardashian's photo easily elicits memory regarding the visual representation of Baartman. The photographer and director of the photo, Jean-Paul Goude, based the photo on his previous work "Carolina Beaumont", taken of a nude model in 1976 and published in his book Jungle Fever.

A People Magazine article in 1979 about his relationship with model Grace Jones describes Goude in the following statement:

Jean-Paul has been fascinated with women like Grace since his youth. The son of a French engineer and an American-born dancer, he grew up in a Paris suburb. From the moment he saw West Side Story and the Alvin Ailey dance troupe, he found himself captivated by "ethnic minorities" — black girls, PRs. "I had jungle fever." He now says, "Blacks are the premise of my work."

Days before the shoot, Goude often worked with his models to find the best "hyperbolised" position to take his photos. His model and partner, Grace Jones, would also pose for days prior to finally acquiring the perfect form. "That's the basis of my entire work," Goude states, "creating a credible illusion." Similarly, Baartman and other black female slaves were illustrated and depicted in a specific form to identify features, which were seen as proof of ideologies regarding black female primitivism.

The professional background of Goude and the specific posture and presentation of Kardashian's image in the recreation on the cover of Paper Magazine has caused feminist critics to comment how the objectification of the Baartman's body and the ethnographic representation of her image in 19th-century society presents a comparable and complementary parallel to how Kardashian is currently represented in the media.

In response to the November 2014 photograph of Kim Kardashian, Cleuci de Oliveira published an article on Jezebel titled "Saartjie Baartman: The Original Bootie Queen", which claims that Baartman was "always an agent in her own path." Oliveira goes on to assert that Baartman performed on her own terms and was unwilling to view herself as a tool for scientific advancement, an object of entertainment, or a pawn of the state.

Neelika Jayawardane, a literature professor and editor of the website Africa Is a Country, published a response to Oliveira's article. Jayawardane criticises de Oliveira's work, stating that she "did untold damage to what the historical record shows about Baartman". Jayawardane's article is cautious about introducing what she considers false agency to historical figures such as Baartman.

An article titled "Body Talk: Feminism, Sexuality and the Body in the Work of Six African Women Artists", curated by Cameroonian-born Koyo Kouoh, mentions Baartman's legacy and its impact on young female African artists. The work linked to Baartman is meant to reference the ethnographic exhibits of the 19th century that enslaved Baartman and displayed her naked body. Artist Valérie Oka's (Untitled, 2015) rendered a live performance of a black naked woman in a cage with the door swung open, walking around a sculpture of male genitalia, repeatedly. Her work was so impactful it led one audience member to proclaim, "Do we allow this to happen because we are in the white cube, or are we revolted by it?".

Oka's work has been described as 'black feminist art' where the female body is a site for activism and expression. The article also mentions other African female icons and how artists are expressing themselves through performance and discussion by posing the question "How Does the White Man Represent the Black Woman?".

Social scientists James McKay and Helen Johnson cited Baartman to fit newspaper coverage of the African-American tennis players Venus and Serena Williams within racist trans-historical narratives of "pornographic eroticism" and "sexual grotesquerie." According to McKay and Johnson, white male reporters covering the Williams sisters have fixated upon their on-court fashions and their muscular bodies, while downplaying their on-court achievements, describing their bodies as mannish, animalistic, or hyper-sexual, rather than well-developed. Their victories have been attributed to their supposed natural physical superiorities, while their defeats have been blamed on their supposed lack of discipline. This analysis claims that commentary on the size of Serena's breasts and bottom, in particular, mirrors the spectacle made of Baartman's body.

Heather Radke's 2022 Butts: A Backstory heavily relied on Baartman's story to examine the cultural history of women's buttocks.

=== Reclaiming the story ===
In recent years, some black women have found her story to be a source of empowerment, one that protests against the ideals of white mainstream beauty, as curvaceous bodies are increasingly lauded in popular culture and mass media.

Paramount Chief Glen Taaibosch, chair of the Gauteng Khoi and San Council, says that today "we call her our Hottentot Queen" and honour her.

== Legacy and honours ==
Baartman became an icon in South Africa as representative of many aspects of the nation's history.

- The Saartjie Baartman Centre for Women and Children, a refuge for survivors of domestic violence, opened in Cape Town in 1999.
- South Africa's first offshore environmental protection vessel, the Sarah Baartman, is also named after her.
- In 2015 South Africa's former Cacadu District Municipality was renamed Sarah Baartman District Municipality in her honor.
- On 8 December 2018, the University of Cape Town made the decision to rename Memorial Hall, at the centre of the campus, to Sarah Baartman Hall. This follows the earlier removal of "Jameson" from the hall's name.

== Cultural references ==
=== Literature ===
- William Edmondstoune Aytoun, writing under the pseudonym "Dunshunner", referenced Baartman in the satirical poem "Crinoliniana" (1863), which compares a woman wearing a crinoline to a "Venus" from "the Cape".
- Dame Edith Sitwell referred to Baartman allusively in "Hornpipe", a poem in the satirical collection Façade.
- Elizabeth Alexander explored Baartman's life and legacy in the poem The Venus Hottentot (1987) and the poetry collection of the same name (1990).
- Mordechai Geldman explored Baartman's story in the poem "The Hottentot Venus" (1993), published in his collection Eye.
- Diana Ferrus wrote I've Come to Take You Home (1998), a poem that became closely associated with the campaign to repatriate Baartman's remains from France to South Africa.
- Joanna Bator referenced a fictional descendant of Baartman in her novel Chmurdalia (2010).
- Douglas Kearney reinterpreted Baartman's story through contemporary language and culture in the poem "Drop It Like It's Hottentot Venus" (2012).
- Diane Awerbuck featured Baartman as a central theme in the novel Home Remedies (2013), which reflects on the ways in which her story has been remembered and interpreted.

=== Non-fiction ===
- Heather Radke used Baartman's life and afterlife to examine the cultural history of women's buttocks in Butts: A Backstory (2022).

=== Theatre and film ===
- A pantomime titled The Hottentot Venus (1811) was staged at the New Theatre in London while Baartman was still alive and being exhibited in Britain.
- Zola Maseko directed the documentary The Life and Times of Sarah Baartman (1998), which examines both her life and her continuing significance in South African history.
- Lydia R. Diamond reinterpreted Baartman's life from a postcolonial perspective in the play Voyeurs de Venus (2008).
- Zodwa Nyoni debuted the play A Khoisan Woman (2019) at Summerhall, reimagining Baartman's voice and experiences.

=== Visual art ===
- Lyle Ashton Harris collaborated with Renee Valerie Cox to create the photographic work Hottentot Venus 2000 (2000), which reinterprets Baartman's image and critiques the historical objectification of Black women's bodies.
- Brett Bailey included a depiction of Baartman in Exhibit B (2014), a performance installation examining colonialism, racial spectacle, and human exhibitions.

== See also ==
- Awoulaba
- Ota Benga
- Body shape
- Jacinta Maria de Santana
- Female body shape
- Feminine beauty ideal
- Feminism and racism
- Human variability
- Human zoo
- Racial fetishism
- Racism in Europe
- Scientific racism
- Tono Maria
