= Diana Ferrus =

South African writer, poet and storyteller (1953–2026)

- Born: 29 August 1953; Worcester, Cape Province, Union of South Africa
- Died: 30 January 2026 (aged 72); South Africa
- Education: Utrecht University
- Occupations: Writer, storyteller
- Employer: University of the Western Cape
- Notable work: "A Poem For Sarah Baartman"
- Website: web.archive.org/web/20130405182247/http://dianaferrus.com/

Diana Ferrus (29 August 1953 – 30 January 2026) was a South African writer and storyteller of mixed Khoisan and slave ancestry. Her work was published in Afrikaans and English. Ferrus led writing workshops in Cape Town whilst working as an administrator at the University of the Western Cape.

Ferrus is best known for her poem about Sarah Baartman, a South African woman taken to Europe under false pretenses and paraded as a curiosity. She wrote the poem in 1998 while studying at Utrecht University. The popularity of this poem is widely believed to be responsible for the return of Baartman's remains to South Africa. The poem was published into a French law.

She was a founder of the Afrikaans Skrywersvereniging (ASV), Bush Poets, and Women in Xchains. Ferrus had a publishing company called Diana Ferrus Publishers and co-edited and published a collection of stories about fathers and daughters.

Ferrus died on 30 January 2026, at the age of 72.
