= The Life and Times of Sarah Baartman =

1998 South African film

- Directed by: Zola Maseko
- Release date: 1998
- Running time: 53 minutes
- Country: South Africa
- Language: English

The Life and Times of Sarah Baartman is a 1998 South African documentary film directed by Zola Maseko.

== Synopsis ==
The film concerns a woman named Sarah Baartman who lives in the Cape Colony. Set between 1810 and 1815, the documentary relates the true story of a 20-year-old woman travelling to London from Cape Town. A member of the Khoekhoe people, the woman was exhibited as a freak across England and became known as the Hottentot Venus. An abolitionist group unsuccessfully sued to free her from the exhibitionists. Baartman was taken to France in 1814 and from then on became a subject of scientific investigation. Even after her death the following year, she continued to be exploited as her sex organs and brain were displayed at the Musee de l'Homme until 1985.

== Production ==
Zola Maseko travelled to Paris to look at a plaster cast of Baartman's body at the Musee de l'Homme. In order to not replicate the objectification that the woman herself experienced, he decided not to film the cast in the nude. Instead, Maseko persuaded an African museum worker to let him use her robe to help keep some dignity for Baartman. Maseko worked on the film for seven years.

== Release and reception ==
The film was critically acclaimed. It garnered many awards including Best African Documentary, 1999 at the Panafrican Film and Television Festival of Ouagadougou (FESPACO), Best Documentary at the 1999 Milan African Film Festival and an award at the 2001 African Literature Association Conference Film Festival. Writing in the journal H-AfriLitCine, Miriam Ma'at-Ka-Re Monges called it "an excellent film" and said she "would recommend that it be made a part of the video library of African, African-American and Women's Studies programs." Keith Shiri wrote in The Guardian: "This powerful documentary is only the second film from this young South African filmmaker and heralds the emergence of an exceptionally talented filmmaker." Jane Bryce of the African Studies Review Journal wrote: "Maseko’s film makes its case with poignancy and compassion; imaginative use of historical documents and artistic representations, in-depth research and a wide range of contemporary expert opinion."
