= Sadiah Qureshi =

Professor of Modern British History at the University of Manchester

Sadiah Qureshi, FRHistS, FRAI, FLS, is a Professor, holding a Chair in Modern British History at the University of Manchester. She is an expert on race, science and empire in the modern world.

== Education ==
Qureshi was awarded all of her degrees from the University of Cambridge. Her PhD (2005) thesis was entitled Living Curiosities: Human Ethnological Exhibitions in London, 1800-1855. She received her MPhil in 2001, and began her academic career with an undergraduate degree in the Natural Sciences.

== Career ==
Following her PhD, Qureshi held a postdoctoral research fellowship with the Cambridge Victorian Studies Group on a five-year Leverhulme funded project entitled ‘Past versus Present: Abandoning the Past in an Age of Progress’, which explored Victorian notions of the past.

In 2013, her book, Peoples on Parade: Exhibitions, Empire and Anthropology in Nineteenth-Century Britain (2011) was joint winner of the Sonya Rudikoff Award for best first book published in Victorian Studies. In 2012, she was awarded a Philip Leverhulme Prize for Medieval, Early Modern and Modern History from the Leverhulme Trust in recognition of her outstanding research. Qureshi’s second book,Vanished: An Unnatural History of Extinction was published by Allen Lane/Penguin Books, in 2025 and was chosen by the Financial Times as a book to read in 2025. It was shortlisted for the 2026 Wolfson History Prize. She received a mid-career fellowship from the British Academy for this project.

Qureshi is a Fellow of the Royal Historical Society. She contributed to the RHS's Race, Ethnicity & Equality Working Group to examine the challenges facing black and minority ethnic historians in UK higher education. Qureshi has contributed to media outlets such as the New Statesman and the London Review of Books, and is an editor of History Workshop Journal.

== Bibliography ==
=== Books ===
- Peoples on Parade: Exhibitions, Empire, and Anthropology in Nineteenth-Century Britain. 2011, University of Chicago Press
- Vanished: An Unnatural History of Extinction, 2025, Allen Lane/Penguin Books

=== Articles and reviews ===
- ''Star-Spangled Racism'' New Statesman, 2017, pp. 44–45.
- ''We Prefer their Company'' London Review of Books, 2017, pp. 39–40.
- 'Peopling the landscape: Showmen, displayed peoples and travel illustration in nineteenth-century Britain', Early Popular Visual Culture, 2012, vol. 10, no. 1, pp. 23–36.
- 'Robert Gordon Latham, Displayed Peoples and the Natural History of Race, 1854-1866', The Historical Journal, vol. 54, no. 1, pp. 143–166.
- 'Displaying Sara Baartman, the ‘Hottentot Venus’', History of Science, vol. 42, no. 2, pp. 233–257

== See also ==
- Human zoo, one of her areas of study
- Victorian era
- Extinction
