= Butts: A Backstory =

2022 book by Heather Radke

- Author: Heather Radke
- Subjects: Female anatomy; Buttocks; Society and culture
- Genre: Non-fiction
- Publisher: Avid Reader
- Publication date: November 2022
- Pages: 320
- ISBN: 978-1-982135-48-5

Butts: A Backstory is a 2022 microhistory by journalist Heather Radke. It examines the cultural history of women's buttocks. It received generally positive reviews and was named to the Time, Esquire, Amazon, Inc. and Publishers Weekly lists of the best books of the year. Published in November 2022 by Avid Reader, it is Radke's first book.

== Content ==
The book examines the cultural history surrounding women's buttocks. It addresses exploitation, historical changes in women's fashions, historical changes in concepts of sexual attractiveness, body dysmorphia, body shaming, misogyny, gender-specific experiences, fitness fads, eugenics, appropriation, monetization, popular culture, racial stereotypes, and pseudoscientific racism. It also investigates the evolutionary development of the human buttocks.

== Reception ==
The book was reviewed favorably in multiple national publications and named to multiple best-of lists. Publishers Weekly, calling it "whip-smart" and "an essential study of 'ideas and prejudices' about the female body", gave it a starred review and named it to their list of best nonfiction books of 2022. Time named it to their 100 must-read books of the year. Esquire called it "wildly entertaining" and "the best kind of nonfiction—the kind that forces you to see something ordinary through completely new eyes" and named it to their list of best books of 2022. Library Journal called Radke's writing "captivating" and her approach "witty". Amazon named it to their list of 20 best books of the year. Inc. named it to their list of best books of the year.

Some reviews were more mixed. The Washington Post called the book "winning, cheeky and illuminating" but called the introduction "weak and gratuitous". Kirkus called it "a thorough uncovering of the symbolism, history, and significance of the female posterior in Western culture" but said the book's "language and sentence structures are repetitive, even tedious".

== See also ==
- Saartjie Baartman
- "Baby Got Back"
- Brazilian butt lift
- Buns of Steel
- Bustle
- Callipygia
- Twerking
