= Jacinta Maria de Santana =

Brazilian woman whose embalmed body was used for educational purposes

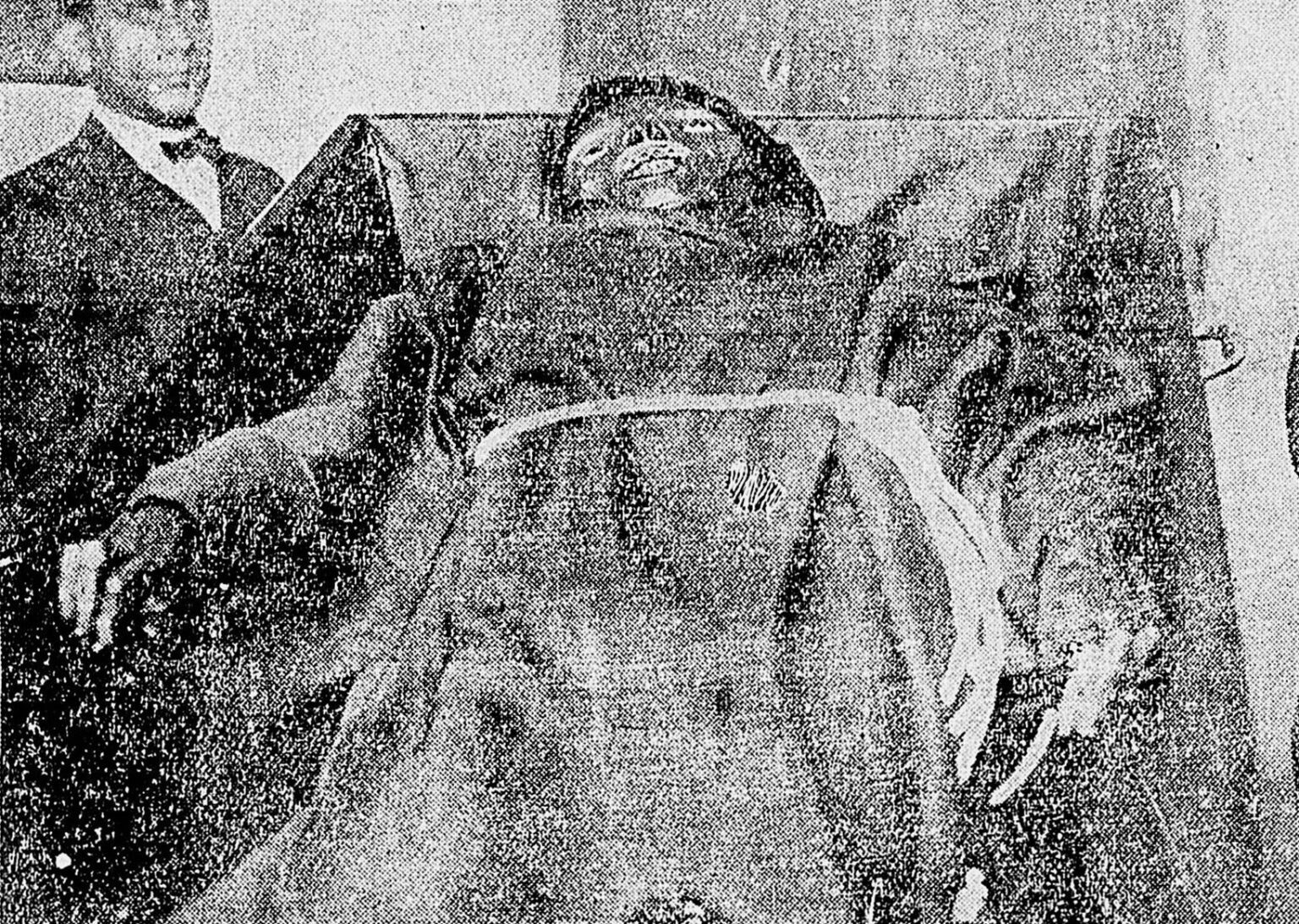
- Mummified body of Jacinta Maria de Santana in 1929, in a coffin, dressed in a Franciscan habit
- Born: c. 1870
- Died: 26 November 1900 (aged 29–30); São Paulo, Brazil
- Resting place: Cemitério São Paulo
- Other names: Raimunda; Benedita
- Known for: Having her embalmed body displayed as a scientific curiosity and used in student pranks

Jacinta Maria de Santana (c. 1870 – 26 November 1900) was an Afro-Brazilian woman. After her death, her body was embalmed by the coroner Amâncio de Carvalho and used as teaching material at the São Paulo Law School, before its affiliation with the University of São Paulo (USP), where it remained on display for nearly thirty years.

At the São Paulo Law School, she became primarily known for the student pranks involving her body, and she was referred to by students as Raimunda or Benedita. In the most notorious incident, the mummy was removed from its glass case and thrown out of a classroom window by students. After Amâncio de Carvalho's death in 1928, the director of the Law School granted the request of Emília Carvalho, Amâncio's widow, to bury "Raimunda." The public burial took place the following year at the Cemitério São Paulo, attended by members of São Paulo's Black community and representatives of media outlets. However, the current whereabouts of the embalmed body are unknown, and her name does not appear in the records of the Cemitério São Paulo, which are held in the São Paulo Municipal Historical Archive.

The case gained significant attention in April 2021, following a report by the website Ponte Jornalismo titled "How the country's leading law school violated a Black woman's body for 30 years," which highlighted findings from an ongoing master's research project. In response, the director of the USP Law School (FDUSP) acknowledged the institution's wrongdoing and pointed to the persistence of racism in contemporary society. The following month, he established a committee to investigate the matter, which, in the subsequent year, issued a report absolving Amâncio and the University of any blame.

At the time of the report's publication, students at FDUSP protested against honors previously bestowed upon Amâncio de Carvalho. Some sought to rename the Amâncio de Carvalho Room, where Raimunda's mummy was displayed for nearly 30 years. In a political intervention in the Vila Mariana district of São Paulo, other students placed names of Black historical figures on street signs honoring individuals with racist and eugenicist backgrounds. On this occasion, Doutor Amâncio de Carvalho Street was symbolically renamed "Jacinta Maria de Santana Street."

== Death and embalming ==
The documented history of Jacinta begins with her death. Jacinta Maria de Santana was a poor woman without fixed employment who often wandered the center of São Paulo. According to the coroner Amâncio de Carvalho, who embalmed her, she was approximately 30 years old and a "frequent guest of the police due to her excessive intemperance." She was "entirely infiltrated, particularly in the abdomen, where there was peritoneal effusion." She was to be admitted to the Santa Casa de Misericórdia with a diagnosis of cardiac injury when, at 10 a.m. on November 26, 1900, she died in the vehicle transporting her. Some sources indicate she fell ill and fainted in the public walkway at the beginning of Dutra Rodrigues Street, 700 meters from Estação da Luz, and died on the way to the Santa Casa de Misericórdia hospital in the Consolação district. Authorities were notified, and two officials attended the scene: Marcondes Machado, a police coroner, and Pinheiro Prado, the delegate of the 1st Precinct. According to coroner Marcondes Machado, the cause of death was a "cardiac injury."

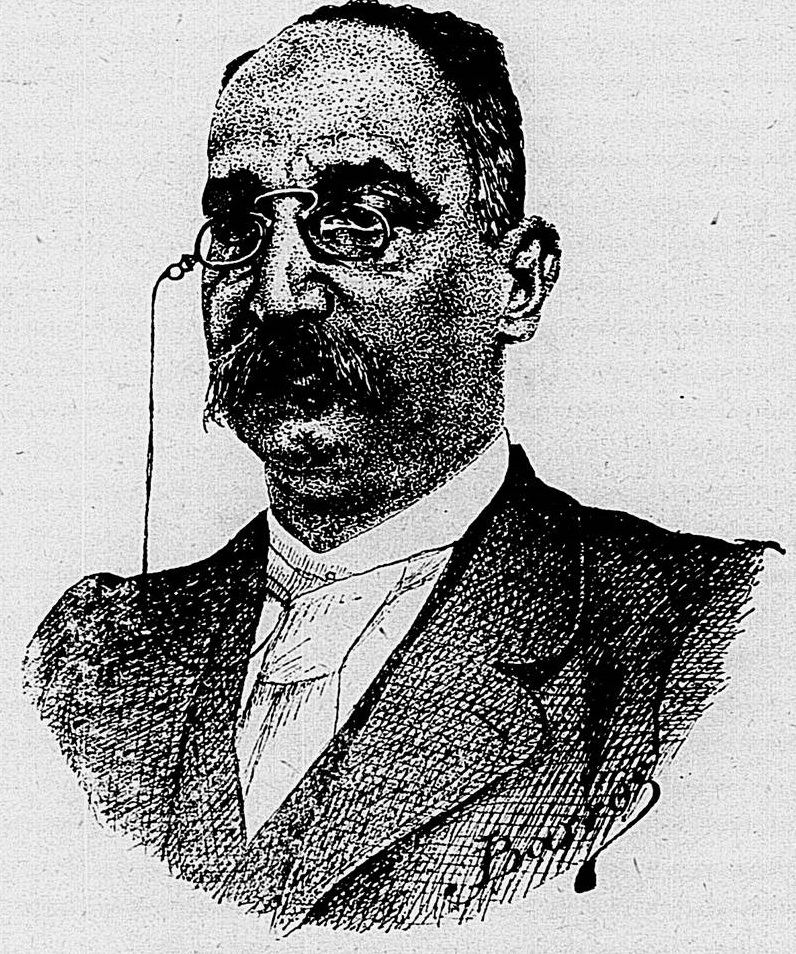
Amâncio de Carvalho, the coroner who embalmed Jacinta.

At noon on the same day, the body was handed over to Amâncio de Carvalho at his request. In 1891, Carvalho had established the new chair of forensic medicine at the São Paulo Law School, considered one of the most competent professionals in the country at the time. Carvalho requested the body to test a new embalming method and later use it for classroom studies. Years earlier, in August 1896, Carvalho had successfully embalmed the body of a child, which remained on display for 30 days in the central police doctors' room without decomposing. Carvalho used the same embalming process as Dubois and Lacassagne, involving interstitial injections of methyl alcohol, which he found particularly interesting due to its minimally invasive nature. He was the first to practice embalming a body in Brazil. Carvalho refined this method, garnering significant curiosity and recognition, with his technique compared to that used by the ancient Egyptians.

On December 1, 1901, after the embalming was completed, Jacinta's varnished body was temporarily displayed in the window of the Charutaria do Commercio on 15 de Novembro Street, between Tesouro Street and Direita Street, before being taken to the classroom at the Law School, attracting significant curiosity and crowds of passersby in front of the establishment. According to historian Lívia Maria Tiede, in the words of journalist, politician, and abolitionist Xavier da Silveira Júnior, the display provoked "the most varied comments" among passersby, eliciting a sense of compassion. Xavier da Silveira described the exhibition as an attempt to create a monstrous image to scare children, accusing Carvalho of charlatanism, desecration, and self-promotion. In response, Carvalho reportedly stated that displaying her was a "service to the nation," as "the experiment would enable marvelous discoveries and the embalming of notable national figures."

A few days later, the mummy was taken to the Law School, where it remained for three decades. Amâncio kept it locked in a veiled display case with a glass lid, hung by the scalp, to the left of his desk in Room 7, opposite a skeleton, where fifth-year students attended forensic medicine classes. According to some student descriptions, the body emitted a foul odor and had a sticky appearance, causing migraines among students seated in the rows closest to where the mummy was displayed in Amâncio’s classroom, while others noted it smelled of cinnamon.

The mummification of Jacinta was one of the reasons Amâncio de Carvalho became celebrated, particularly among his students. When he died on July 17, 1928, among the curious cases of his professional life reported in the eulogies published in the press was that of the "famous mummy that the distinguished doctor had obtained through his own undisclosed process," used to teach forensic medicine to fifth-year students, with accounts also describing the occasion when it was stolen by students at the faculty.

== Desecration of the embalmed body ==
Among students, mockery and desecration of the body were rampant, particularly in the 1900s, though the mummy later fell into obscurity over the years, only being remembered during class hours. Students nicknamed her Raimunda, and she was also known as Benedita. The April 22, 1929, edition of O Estado from Florianópolis reported that numerous student pranks involving the body took place at the São Paulo Law School. Among them, the article described an incident in which a blindfolded journalist was forced to kiss the mummy Raimunda. In the June 7, 1929, edition of the São Paulo newspaper O Diário Nacional, other "jokes" carried out by students at the São Paulo Law School (before its affiliation with USP) using the mummy Raimunda were detailed: students' hats were stolen and placed on her head, candles were put in her hands, and her body was arranged "in the strangest positions."

=== Kidnapping of the mummy ===
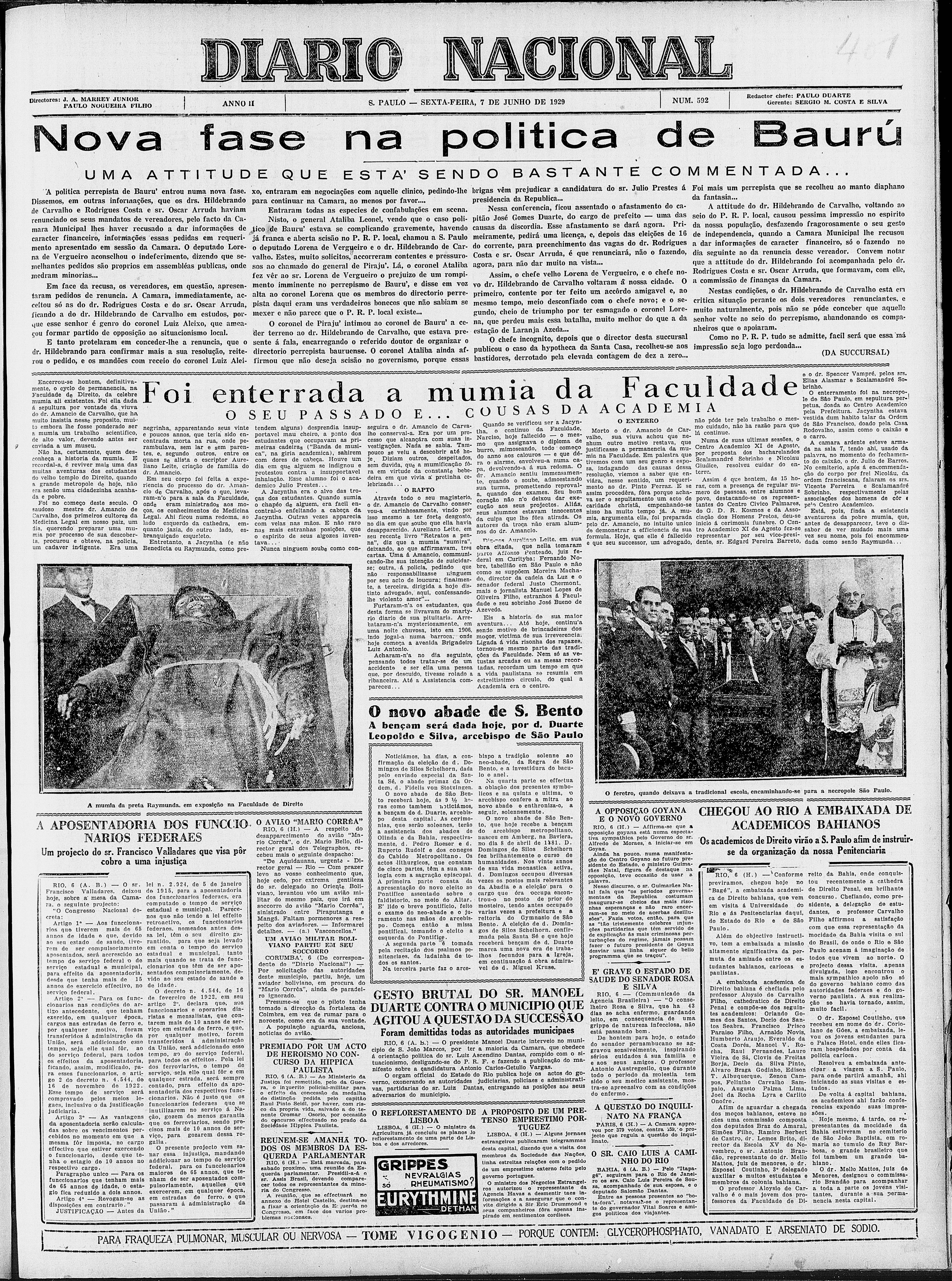
The burial of Jacinta Maria de Santana was reported on the front page of Diário Nacional.

The most infamous desecration became known as the "kidnapping of the mummy." On a rainy night, October 3, 1907, a group of students, intending to rid themselves of the foul odor it emitted and simultaneously pull a prank, stole the mummy from its display case and threw it out a window. The lawyer, writer, and historian Aureliano Leite, then a student at the Law School, described the incident in his work "Retratos a penna": the mummy "disappeared, leaving, as they claimed, three letters. One to Amâncio, announcing her intention to commit suicide; another to the police, asking that no one be held responsible for her act of madness; and finally, a third to a distinguished lawyer here, confessing her passionate love for him…". The mummy was then thrown into a ravine behind the Faculty of Law, in the Campos da Baronesa, where Brigadeiro Luís Antônio Avenue now begins. It was found the next day, causing great commotion, as people initially thought it was someone who had suffered an accident and, through carelessness, had rolled down the slope, prompting the Municipal Assistance to respond. Upon realizing it was not an ordinary corpse, it was mistaken for a Black woman who had been murdered and burned, leading to the Civic Guard being called, who initially believed it was a crime. When it was confirmed to be the Faculty’s mummy, a staff member who had reported the theft wrapped it in a cloak and returned it to its display case.

Upon discovering the mummy’s disappearance, Amâncio de Carvalho was deeply distressed and equally upset upon learning its fate. The individuals involved included Afonso Penteado, a federal judge in Curitiba; Fernando Nobre, a notary in São Paulo; the journalist Manuel Lopes de Oliveira Filho, an outsider to the Faculty; and his nephew José Bueno de Azevedo, none of whom were Amâncio’s students. Despite the culprits not being his students, Carvalho vowed to punish the class at the end of the year, which, according to some sources, he did not do, while others claim it resulted in the denial of distinctions even to the most outstanding students, including politicians Adolfo Konder and Vítor Konder, who also missed the graduation trip to Europe.

The incident was reported the next day by Correio Paulistano, which described it as a "magnificent prank." The episode was remembered for decades, considered the most significant event in student life among the graduates of 1907, as noted during the celebration of their 50th graduation anniversary in December 1957.

Over the years, many legends emerged about the woman whose body was mummified: "It was said she was an 'African princess or queen, brought from that continent as a rarity'; a 'Black woman who sold oranges'; a 'Black orphan'; a 'former slave'; a 'young Black woman in her twenties, found dead on the street'; or even the 'servant who worked for Amâncio for many years.'" After the mummy’s removal from the Faculty and its burial, Raimunda became a ghostly figure, with rumors claiming her spirit haunted the Faculty’s corridors.

In 1931, the memory of the "mummy Raimunda" remained alive, with the nickname given to basketball player José Vilhena of Athletica due to his thinness and dark skin. According to Lívia Maria Tiede, this is an example of the sarcastic and malicious reverberation of the mummy’s racial and gender condition, as it is unlikely such a nickname would have been given to a white player.

== Burial ==
After Amâncio de Carvalho’s death in 1928, his widow, Emília da Silva Carvalho, considering there was no longer any reason for the mummy to remain at the Faculty—since it had been prepared by her husband solely to demonstrate the effectiveness of his embalming formula, and his successor, a lawyer, lacked the expertise to maintain it—requested its burial. Emília viewed the burial as an act of Christian charity but also as her right, arguing that the mummy was not the Faculty’s property but belonged to her late husband, who had merely placed it there for instructional purposes. To this end, she sent a request to the institution’s director, Antonio Januario Pinto Ferraz.

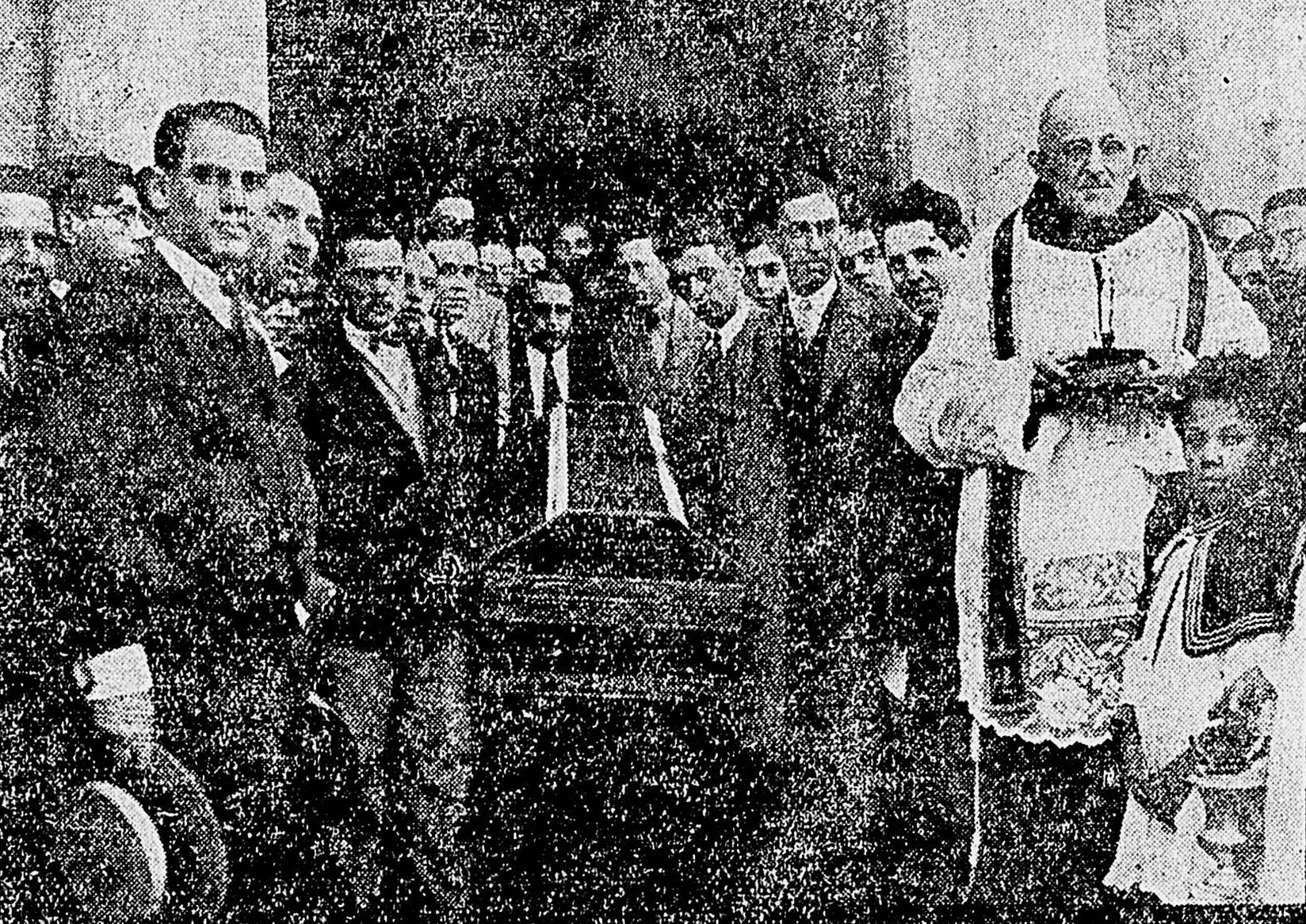
Entities present at Jacinta’s funeral, at the moment the escort left the coffin; on the right, Friar Nicolau, who performed the commendation

After initial deliberations, as the mummy was considered a scientific work of high value that should have been sent to a museum, in June 1929, nearly 30 years after Jacinta’s death, its burial was finally authorized. For this purpose, the Municipal Prefecture donated a perpetual grave at the Cemitério São Paulo in the Pinheiros neighborhood, in the western zone of São Paulo, to the Academic Center.

According to Lívia Maria Tiede, who describes the activist and journalist Frederico Baptista de Souza as "one of the leading figures of São Paulo’s Black press in the early 20th century," he was among those who actively worked to ensure the mummy’s burial, having witnessed its display during his time working at the Faculty of Law between 1900 and 1940.

The funeral took place on June 6, 1929. At least six Black organizations attended Jacinta’s burial: the Association of Black Men, the Palmares Civic Center, the Kosmos Dramatic and Recreational Guild, and the Society of Men of Color, along with the newspapers Clarim d’Alvorada and O Progresso. Frederico Baptista de Souza participated in the burial and published an article in the resistance newspaper O Clarim d'Alvorada criticizing the low attendance of Black individuals at the ceremony.

Jacinta’s body was dressed in a talar habit of the Order of Saint Francis, donated by Casa Rodovalho, along with the coffin and hearse. The chapel of rest was set up in Room 7, where Dr. Júlio de Barros spoke at the moment the coffin was closed. At the cemetery, after the commendation of the body by Friar Nicolau of the Franciscan order, speeches were given by Vicente Ferreira, representing the associations of people of color, and Scalamandré Sobrinho, representing the Academic Center.

The Diário Nacional published an extensive front-page article covering the burial, which reported a final affront to Jacinta’s memory. During the commendation, her real name was not used; instead, she was referred to by the nickname by which the mummy was known: Raimunda.

The newspaper O Estado also published a brief note in its June 7, 1929, edition, transcribed here in the original spelling:

The Mummy of Raymunda

São Paulo, 6 (A. A.), — The burial of the mummy of the Black woman Raymunda, who was a servant of the Faculty of Medicine professor Amancio de Carvalho, takes place this afternoon.

The mummy was kept in a glass case in the main room of the Faculty; now the professor’s family has requested that the academics allow its burial.

== Rediscovery of the case ==
In December 2020, student Caio da Silva Prado published an article in memory of the mummy Raimunda in the Gazeta Arcadas, the student newspaper of the São Paulo Law School, based on two newspaper articles from April and June 1929. The story gained broader media attention on April 9, 2021, when the website Ponte Jornalismo published a report titled "How the country's leading law school violated a Black woman's body for 30 years," highlighting the research of Suzane Jardim, a historian and master’s student in Social Sciences at the Universidade Federal do ABC. Suzane stated that she stumbled upon the story by chance while reading a 1929 text about the burial of a "mummy" nicknamed Raimunda. Researching contemporary periodicals such as O Estado and O Diário Nacional, the historian confirmed that Raimunda’s real name was Jacinta Maria de Santana. According to Suzane, newspapers consistently portrayed her in an extremely racist manner. Moved by the cruelty described in these texts, Suzane dedicated efforts to rediscovering this woman’s identity and bringing her memory back to light.

When seeking further information, the Ponte Jornalismo reporting team visited the cemetery and historical archive, discovering that Jacinta’s tomb, though documented as a perpetual grave, was no longer at the Cemitério São Paulo. The records of the Cemitério São Paulo, held at the Municipal Historical Archives of São Paulo, do not list Jacinta’s name on June 6, 1929, or subsequent dates. According to the cemetery’s administrative office, the Municipal Prefecture conducted a renovation in the 1930s, removing individual graves to make space for more family mausoleums, during which Jacinta’s body may have been discarded.

=== Repercussions ===
In May 2021, the University of São Paulo Law School established a committee to investigate the mistreatment of Jacinta Maria de Santana’s body.

The day after the Ponte report was published, on April 10, 2021, the director of the University of São Paulo Law School (FDUSP), Floriano de Azevedo Marques Neto, published an article titled "Revisiting history, acknowledging the mistake, enabling the future," in which he recognized the atrocities committed against Jacinta’s body, stating that the repeated disrespectful acts at the institution highlighted the strong racism of the time, which still persists. In the article, Floriano Neto also noted that, until 2012, Black students were rare at the USP Law School, and until recently, it was common for professors to make racist and sexist remarks in the classroom without reprimand.

On May 10, 2021, through Ordinance GDI-09/2021, issued by Floriano Neto, a committee was established to investigate the facts reported by Suzane Jardim regarding the mistreatment of Jacinta Maria de Santana’s body, with professors and students of the institution as members. The second article of the ordinance set a 120-day deadline for the committee’s work, which could be extended. One committee member was replaced by Ordinance GDI-14/2021 on July 1, 2021. On September 1, 2022, the Congregation of the University of São Paulo Law School (FDUSP) voted on the report of the committee established on May 10, 2021, by Ordinance GDI-09/2021. The report absolved Amâncio de Carvalho and the university of any blame.

Following the publication of the Ponte report, students at the FDUSP mobilized against past honors given to Amâncio de Carvalho, who mummified Jacinta. Students contacted professors and collectives to discuss renaming the room at the institution named after this tenured professor, where Amâncio taught forensic medicine classes and where the mummy Raimunda was displayed for nearly 30 years. On March 30, 2023, the Congregation of the USP Law School voted to remove the honor, approved almost unanimously (with one abstention). The decision outlined the steps to be taken: removal of the plaque and portrait of Amâncio (to be sent to the FDUSP museum) and replacement with a plaque detailing the history that occurred in the room and the justification for removing the honor.

Amâncio also lends his name to a street in São Paulo, in the Vila Mariana neighborhood, in the southern zone of the city, an honor bestowed by the Municipal Prefecture in 1928, the year of Amâncio’s death. On August 11, 2021, students from the University of São Paulo Law School conducted a political intervention in the city, placing names of Black historical figures on street signs honoring individuals with racist and eugenicist backgrounds. On this occasion, the Doutor Amâncio de Carvalho street sign was symbolically renamed "Jacinta Maria de Santana Street," with the description: "Black homeless woman whose body was embalmed, displayed as a scientific curiosity, and used in student pranks at São Paulo Law School." The intervention was symbolic and did not change the official street name, which remains Amâncio de Carvalho.

== See also ==
- Structural racism
- Saartjie Baartman
