= Zola Maseko =

Swazi film director (born 1967)

- Born: 1967 (age 58–59)
- Education: National Film and Television School
- Occupations: Filimmaker, screenwriter
- Notable work: Drum (2004)

Zola Maseko (born 1967) is a Swazi film director and screenwriter. He is noted for his documentary films related to xenophobia.

== Early life and education ==
Zola Maseko was born in exile in 1967 and educated in Swaziland (now Eswatini) and Tanzania.

After moving to the United Kingdom, he graduated from the National Film and Television School in Beaconsfield in 1994.

== Career ==
Maseko's first film was the documentary Dear Sunshine, released in 1992. He participated in several uMkhonto we Sizwe (MK) guerrilla campaigns.

Maseko moved to South Africa in 1994 after the end of apartheid and wrote The Foreigner, a short fiction film about xenophobia in this country. In 1996, after Maseko drove to his house, an unknown assailant pointed a gun at him and fired twice. He fled after the gun did not fire. A few minutes later, he called his house, and the assailant was on the phone. He "thought [Maseko was] a foreigner. We are a vigilante group going around killing foreigners. We don't want them here".

In 1998 he directed The Life and Times of Sarah Baartman, a 53-minute documentary film about a woman named Sarah Baartman in colonial times. Set between 1810 and 1815, the documentary relates the true story of a 20-year-old woman travelling to London from Cape Town. The woman is taken to France in 1814 and from then on became a subject of scientific investigation. Maseko's cinematic techniques were employed to depict the woman as a sub-human species, emphasising the racial prejudice against black Africans in Europe during imperialist times. Critically acclaimed, it garnered many awards including Best African Documentary, 1999, at the Panafrican Film and Television Festival of Ouagadougou (FESPACO), Best Documentary at the 1999 Milan African Film Festival and an award at the 2001 African Literature Association Conference Film Festival.

Other short films by Maseko include The Return of Sarah Baartman, Children of the Revolution, and A Drink in the Passage, all released in 2002. The latter won the Special Jury Award at FESPACO.

His first feature film was Drum, released in 2004. Set in 1950s Johannesburg, it tells of the magazine of the same name and specifically focuses on Henry Nxumalo, a journalist protesting apartheid. He received the top prize at FESPACO, the Golden Stallion of Yennenga, in addition to a cash prize of 10 million CFA francs (US$20,000) at its closing ceremony in 2005, the first South African to do so. Drum was the first English-language film to win the prize since 1989.

In 2017, he directed and wrote the film adaptation of Zakes Mda's 2006 novel The Whale Caller.

== Filmography ==
=== As director ===
- The Foreigner (1997)
- The Life and Times of Sara Baartman (1998)
- The Return of Sarah Baartman (2002)
- Children of the Revolution (2002)
- A Drink in the Passage (2002)
- Drum (2004)
- The Whale Caller (2017)
