= Tono Maria =

- Born: c. 1782; Minas Gerais, Colonial Brazil
- Died: 3 January 1826; Braunschweig, Duchy of Brunswick
- Other name: "Venus of South America"
- Occupation: Sideshow performer
- Years active: c. 1822–1826
- Known for: Exhibitions in London and continental Europe as the "Venus of South America"
- Children: 1 son

Tono Maria was a South American woman who was displayed at freak shows in London during the early 19th century. She was an Aimoré woman who was born in the Minas Gerais region of Brazil and eventually moved to London at some point in her life. Marketed as the “Venus of South America”, Maria was displayed on numerous freak shows throughout the city, where her body scars (which were claimed to signify a sexual transgression she had committed), large figure, lip and ear plugs became objects of fascination for numerous spectators who viewed her.

== Life ==
Tono Maria was an Aimoré woman who was born in the Minas Gerais region of Brazil around 1782. She eventually moved to London at some point in her life, and was displayed in numerous freak shows around the city.

== Career ==
Around 1822, Maria was exhibited in London, England, under the promotional name "Venus of South America". She appeared in Bond Street and other exhibition venues, where audiences paid to view her lip and ear plugs, body scars, and physical appearance.

An article published in The London Literary Gazette in February 1822 described Maria as "about forty years of age" and claimed she had "made conquest of no fewer than three chieftains in succession" in her homeland. The article also repeated the show's claim that the approximately one hundred scars on her body represented acts of adultery and that she would have been killed after a 105th offence.

Over the next four years, Maria toured Britain and continental Europe under the management of the French showman Jean-Baptiste Chabert. During the tour she gave birth to a son, who was about nine months old when the exhibition reached Braunschweig, in the Duchy of Brunswick (now Lower Saxony, Germany), on 1 January 1826.

== Death and aftermath ==
Shortly after arriving in Braunschweig, Maria became seriously ill. According to contemporary accounts, she removed her lip and ear plugs before her death and entrusted the care of her infant child to Chabert.

Maria died in Braunschweig on 3 January 1826, two days after the exhibition arrived in the city. Following her death, the Braunschweig city authorities purchased her remains for the Anatomical Theater, where her skeleton was prepared and added to the institution's collection.

More than six decades later, in 1890, the Anatomical Theater's collection was transferred to the Natural History Museum of Braunschweig, where Maria's skeleton became part of the museum's holdings.

== Legacy ==
University at Albany professor Janell Hobson briefly recounted Maria in her book, Venus in the Dark: Blackness and Beauty in Popular Culture, describing how spectators in London took particular note of the scars on her body which nearly numbered a hundred; with each scar supposedly representing a sexual transgression committed by Maria. Hobson used Maria to illustrate the contrasting depictions of femininity between white women and women of color. American scholar Rosemarie Garland-Thomson mentioned Maria in her book, Extraordinary Bodies: Figuring Physical Disability in American Culture and Literature, as a spectacle that the London spectators used to confirm their “sense of physical mastery”. Thompson also noted that Maria was seen as a cautionary tale of female hypersexuality.
