= Julien-Joseph Virey =

French naturalist and anthropologist

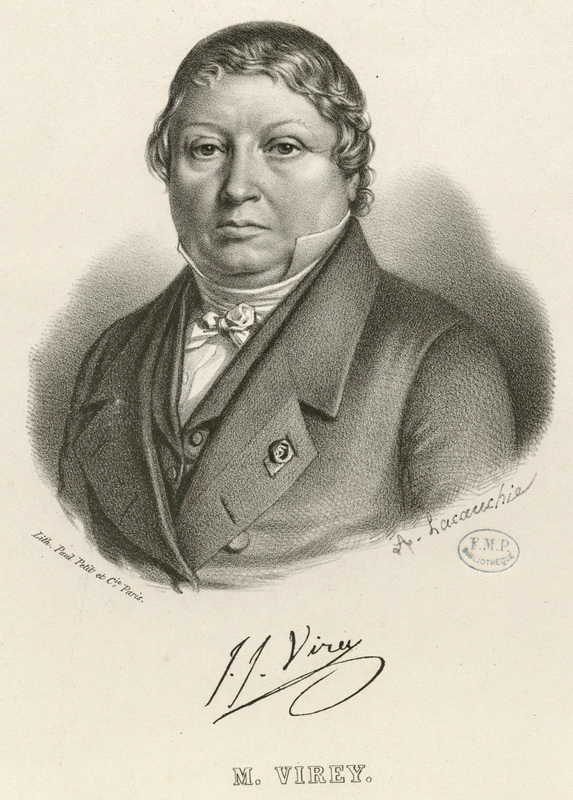
Julien-Joseph Virey

Julien-Joseph Virey (21 December 1775, Langres – 9 March 1846) was a French naturalist and anthropologist.

== Biography ==
Julien-Joseph Virey grew up in Hortes village in southern Haute-Marne, where he had access to a library. He educated himself and became an apprentice to his uncle, a pharmacist. Arriving in Paris, he attended the League of Ideologues and Human Observers.

He later studied medicine and became a medical doctor. After becoming a protégé of Antoine Parmentier (1737–1813), he wrote a major work quickly in the field of anthropology, in which he promoted the theory of polygeny. Virey was interested in the origin of the human races. He wrote the Natural History of Man (1801), which was reprinted in a new edition in 1824. Virey addressed these issues for a long time. The 20th-century scientists Paul Broca and Armand de Quatrefages rank him among the precursors of a style of anthropological questioning, without agreeing with all his ideas.

Most of Virey's work and personal contributions relate to pharmaceutical science and technology. He participated in the reissue of the works of Georges-Louis Leclerc, Comte de Buffon (1707-1788 ) with Charles-Nicolas-Sigisbert Sonnini de Manoncourt (1751–1812). He also contributed articles on many aspects of physiology and natural history to the Nouveau dictionnaire d'histoire naturelle (1816–19).

In 1821 he published a book entitled History of Morals and the Interests of Animals, in which, far from Étienne Bonnot de Condillac and especially in opposition to Descartes, he passed from discussing the "animal soul" to proposing "intelligence in animals".

== Evolution ==
Virey was an early advocate of transmutation of species who a postulated direct descent of humans from apes. Virey used the term evolution in 1803. He was highly critical of the ideas of Jean-Baptiste Lamarck such as spontaneous generation but supported an evolutionary history of life on earth. Virey commented that "It is thus plausible that, thanks to such evolution, nature has arisen from the most tenuous mould to the majestic cedar, to the gigantic pine, just as it has advanced from microscopic animals up to man, king and dominator of all beings." Virey also sketched an early version of the recapitulation theory.

He was a polygenist minimalist, proposing two human species (the "White" and "Black"), divided into six chromatic races. One group consisted of dark-skinned peoples such as Africans which he situated closer to apes than the other of Europeans, American Indians and light-skinned peoples. In 1819, Virey commented that "the apes would seem to be the root of the human genus. From the orang-utan to the Hottentot Bushman, through to the most intelligent negroes, and finally to white man, one passes indeed by almost imperceptible nuances."

Virey was influenced by Buffon and Cabanis. He was part of one of the central controversies in science in 1820–1830, related to the origin and age of man. Georges Cuvier, Jean Baptiste Bory de Saint-Vincent, Louis Antoine Desmoulins and Virey all struggled to determine the origin and age of man.

== Works ==
- Histoire naturelle des Médicamens, des Alimens et des Poisons . Rémont, Paris 1820 Digital edition by the University and State Library Düsseldorf
- Histoire naturelle du genre humain, ou, recherches sur ses principaux fondements physiques et moraux, précédées d'un discours sur la nature des êtres organiques (Paris: Dufart, an 9 [1801])
- Histoire naturelle du genre humain (new edition - Paris: Crochard, 1824)
- "Homme" in Nouveau dictionnaire d'histoire naturelle appliquée aux arts (new edition - Paris: Deterville, 1817)
- Natural History of the Negro Race translated by J.H. Geunebault (Charleston, South Carolina: D.J. Dowling, 1837)
