= Oppikoppi =

Music festival in Limpopo, South Africa

Coordinates: 24°53′02″S 27°08′10″E

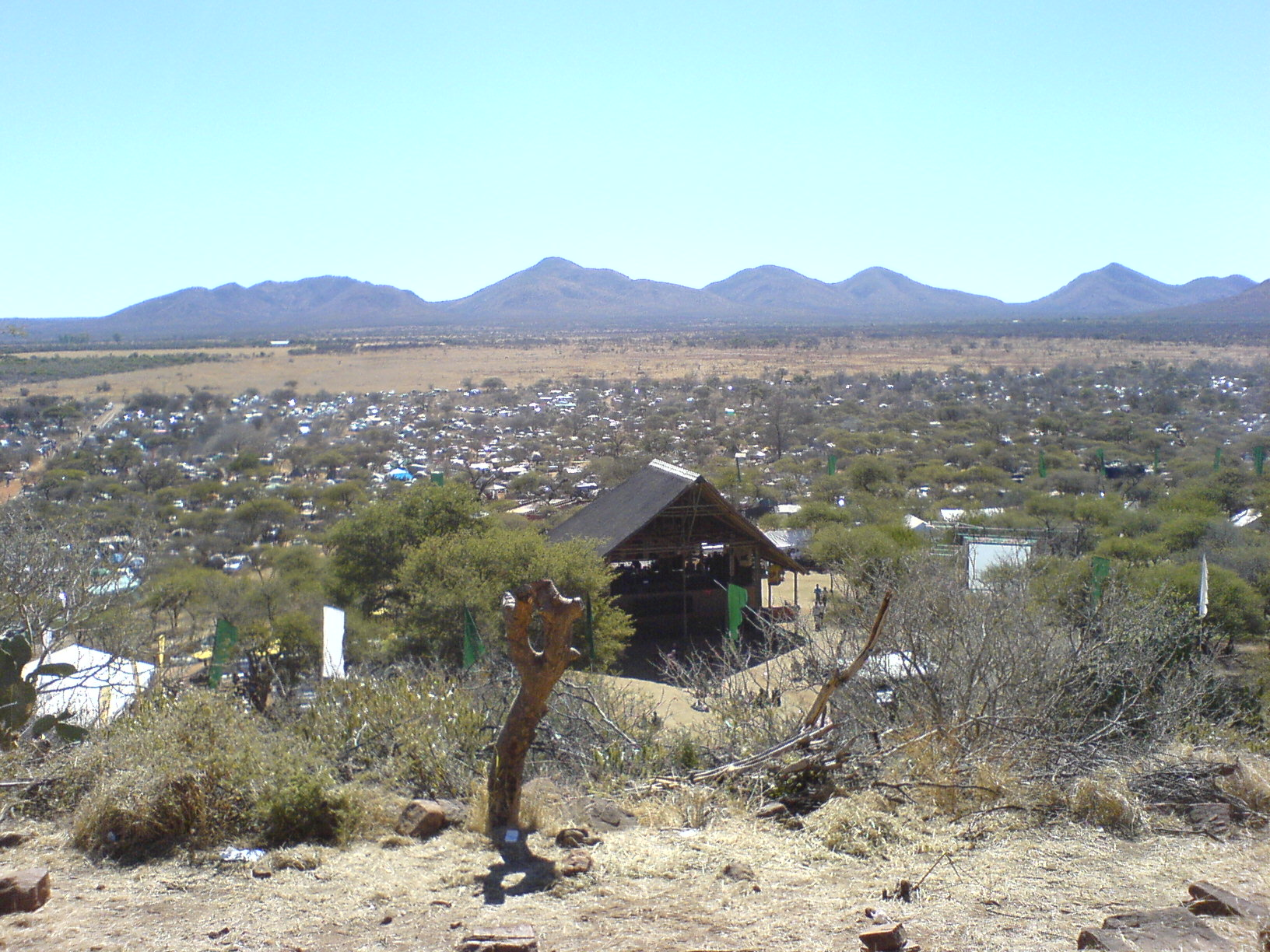
- Oppikoppi from the top
- Genre: Various – rock, jazz, house, acoustic, world music, comedy, metal, indie, soul, punk, emo, many more
- Dates: First week of August
- Locations: Northam, South Africa
- Years active: 1994–2018
- Website: oppikoppi.co.za

Oppikoppi was a music festival held in the Limpopo Province of South Africa, near the mining town of Northam. The festival started off focusing mostly on rock music, but gradually added more genres and now plays host to a complete mixed bag of genres. Anything from jazz, world music, house music, acoustic, comedy and all else in between can be heard on one of the multiple stages. Each year in the first week of August – except for 2017, when the festival was held in October – thousands of people used to flock to the farm to camp out in the bush and enjoy the music for several days. The festival featured mostly South African bands, although international acts were included in the line-up.

The 2018 edition received some negative reception, and that may have been the last year when the festival was held.

== Background ==
"Oppikoppi" was a colloquial abbreviation of the Afrikaans phrase "op die koppie", which literally means "on the hill". The festival derives its name from the resort on the piece of land where it is held, featuring a picturesque hill on top of which there is a bar and a small original stage. Once a year, the festival grounds were erected at the foot of that hill, where many simultaneous performances took place on the several stages. Beyond this were the camping grounds. A stage on a second hill usually featured dance acts and DJs.

== History ==
The festival was first held in August 1995, with 27 local talents performing to a small crowd of enthusiasts. It then grew substantially, with the addition of many new stages and thousands of people turning up each year. The festival was regarded by some as the primary influence in jump-starting the South African live music movement in the late 1990s. It attracted thousands of attendees annually.

According to the organizers, they have "rolled bakkies, burnt tents, driven over knees, slept in jails, slept outside jails and turned over several stones to make gigs and festivals work".

In 2008, the Daily Mirror ranked OppiKoppi as the fourth best music festival in the world.

The festival attendance grew in the early 2000s, with 16,000 attendees and around 100 acts for both 2010 and 2011 and an estimated 20,000 attendees and 130 acts for 2012.

== Acts and genres ==
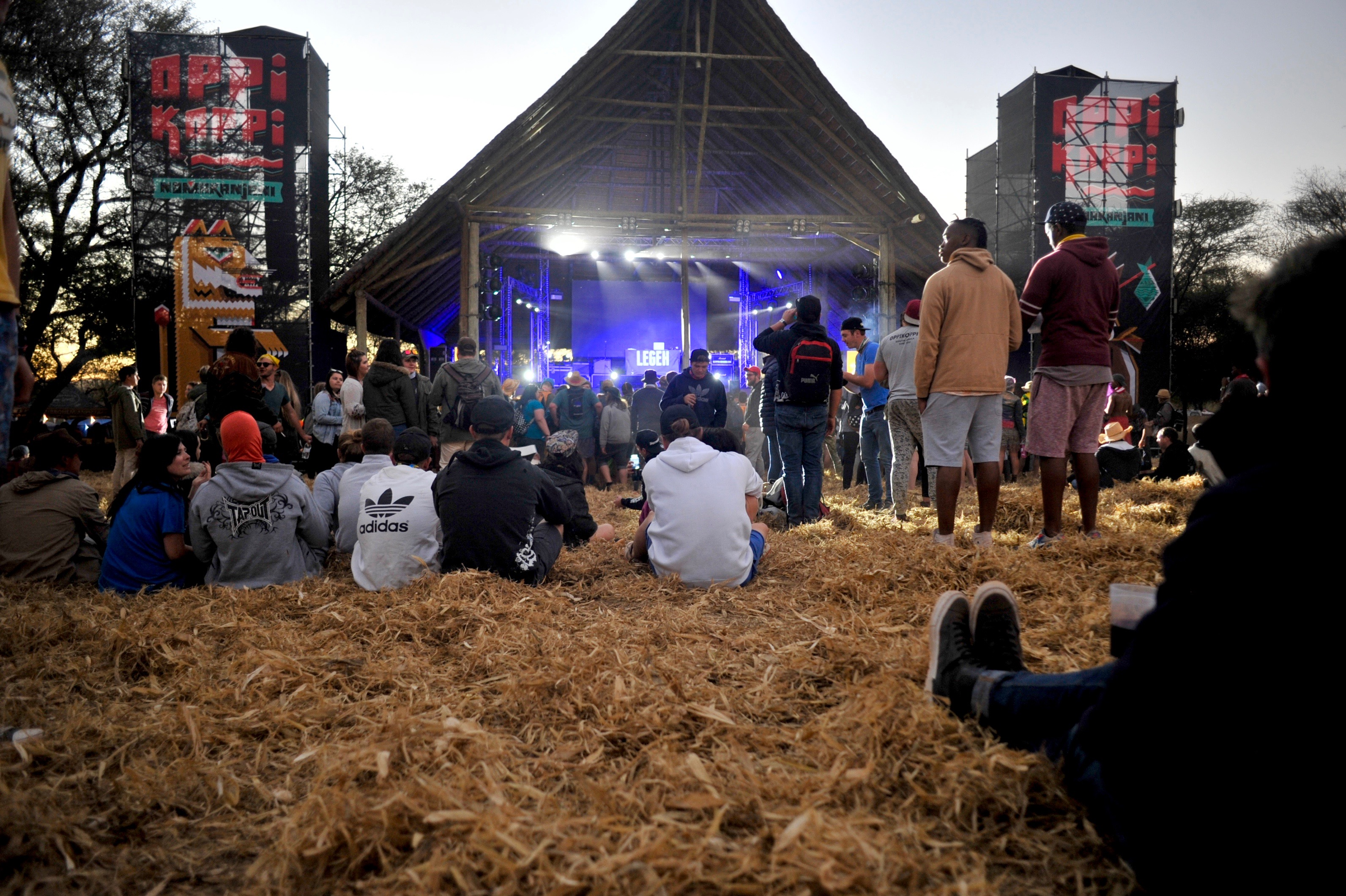
Waiting for the music.

The festival hosted a wide array of acts, with artists being booked from genres including, but not limited to: rock, hip hop, hardcore, punk, ska, folk, blues, drum 'n bass, big beats, funk, kwaito, jazz, traditional, world music, metal, and indie.

In the past there had been smaller, more intimate gatherings on each Easter weekend in April and New Year's gatherings.

In 2012, Oppikoppi announced that it would be organising a festival in Cape Town called "One Night in Cape Town". One Night in Cape Town was organised again in 2013, and every year since.

== Previous editions ==
For a time, Oppikoppi was generally divided into three different strains of Oppikoppi: the main event in August, the Easter edition (which was discontinued after 2009) and miscellaneous events for various reasons. Regardless of the occasion, date and size of each event, they all had different names and themes associated with them. The organisers took a "gap year" in 2019 following negative reviews of the 2018 edition. 2020 dates have not yet been announced.

August Festivals
Year	Date	Theme	Notable performers
1995	4–6 August	Festival of Rock 1	Koos Kombuis, Valiant Swart, Squeal, Sugardrive, Battery 9, Urban Creep, Cardboard
1996	8–11 August	Festival of Rock 2	Squeal, Wendy Oldfield
1997	7–10 August	One Big Bang	Valiant Swart, Squeal, Battery 9
1998	7–9 August	Bushveld Blast	Springbok Nude Girls, Koos Kombuis, Sugardrive, The Awakening
1999	6–9 August	Infestation	Vusi Mahlasela, Boo!, The Awakening, Koos Kombuis, Gert Vlok Nel, Valiant Swart, Sugardrive, Zim Ngqawana, Buckfever Underground, Brasse Vannie Kaap
2000	3–6 August	Trek 2000	Soulwax, Ashton Nyte, Zita Swoon, Bizarre Bazaar
2001	9–12 August	Tuned	Hooverphonic, Max Normal, Karen Zoid, Koos Kombuis, Valiant Swart, Battery 9, Ashton Nyte, Brasse Vannie Kaap, Frank Opperman, David Kramer, Lucky Dube
2002	5–8 September	Plunge	340ml, Albert Frost, Anton Goosen, Battery 9, Brixton Moord en Roof Orkes, De Heideroosjes, Frosted Orange, Fuzigish, Gito Baloi, Hog Hoggidy Hog, Jack Hammer, Kalahari Surfers, Karen Zoid, Kobus!, Koos Kombuis, Not My Dog, Mandoza, Shawn Phillips, Sipho "Hotstix" Mabuse, Tony Cox, Valiant Swart, Vusi Mahlasela, Zola
2003	8–10 August	Hond uit 'n Box	No notable artists
2004	6–9 August	Oppikoppi 10: Blood is thicker than Soda Water	340ml, Arno Carsten's New Porn, Arsenal, Ashton Nyte, Band 'O Gypsys, Battery 9, Bed on Bricks, Boo!, Brixton Moord en Roof Orkes, Buckfever Underground, Cutting Jade, Dan Patlansky, The Fake Leather Blues Band, Fokofpolisiekar, Freshlyground, Gert Vlok Nel, Jack Hammer, Jan Blohm, Karen Zoid, Kobus!, Koos Kombuis, Ollie Viljoen, Pestroy, Prime Circle, Southern Gypsy Queen, Springbok Nude Girls, Squeal, Sugardrive, Syd Kitchen, The Blues Broers, The Narrow, Tidal Waves, Triggerfinger, Valiant Swart, Wonderboom
2005	6–8 August	Wired	Freshlyground, Fokofpolisiekar, Chris Chameleon, 340ml, Sipho "Hotstix" Mabuse
2006	4–6 August	Rock, Paper, Scissors	Saul Williams, Goldfish, Das Pop, Vusi Mahlasela, Fokofpolisiekar, Malaika, Chris Chameleon, The Narrow, Lark, Valiant Swart
2007	9–11 August	Way of the Dassie	Jimmy Eat World, Groove Armada, Violent Femmes, The Parlotones, Prime Circle, Fokofpolisiekar, Hip Hop Pantsula, Chris Chameleon
2008	7–9 August	Wildcard	340ml, aKING, Albert Frost Trio, Bed on Bricks, Black Cat Bones, Cabins in the Forest, Dan Patlansky, Desmond & the Tutus, Farryl Purkiss, Foto na Dans, Freshlyground, Fuzigish, Gert Vlok Nel, Gordon's Suitcase with Strings & Skins, Guy Buttery, Harris Tweed, Isochronous, Jack Hammer, Josie Field, Juggernaught, Karen Zoid, Koos Kombuis, Laurie Levine, Lucky Fonz III (NL), New Academics, Nibs van der Spuy, Sipho "Hotstix" Mabuse, Southern Gypsy Queen, Syd Kitchen, Taxi Violence, The Mojomatics (IT), Tidal Waves, Valiant Swart, Van Coke Kartel, The Vendetta Cartel, Zebra & Giraffe
2009	7–9 August	Smoorverlief	aKING, Andra, Ashtray Electric, Battery 9, Balthazar (BE), Bed on Bricks, Black Hotels, Crash Car Burn, Die Antwoord, Die Heuwels Fantasties, Dirty Skirts, Farryl Purkiss, Fokofpolisiekar, Foto na Dans, Isochronous, Jack Hammer & Friends, Jack Parow, Karen Zoid, Koos Kombuis, Lucky Fonz III (NL), Luke Doucet & Melissa McClelland (CA), Riku Lätti & Albert Frost, Shadow Club, Short Straw, Taxi Violence, The Parlotones, Tidal Waves, Van Coke Kartel & Gerald Clark, Vusi Mahlasela, Wrestlerish, Zebra & Giraffe
2010	6–8 August	Sexy. Crooked. Teeth	Billy Talent, Cortina Whiplash, Die Heuwels Fantasties, Flash Republic, Gemma Ray (UK), Gordon's Suitcase, Hot Water, Jack Parow, Les Javan & Nonspkesifie, Lucky Fonz III (NL), Mind Assault, Pestroy, Philadelphia Grand Jury (AU), Prime Circle, Radio Kalahari Orkes, Schalk Joubert, Sisqó, Southern Gypsy Queen, Straatligkinders, Taxi Violence, The Narrow, Van Coke Kartel, Wrestlerish, Zebra & Giraffe
2011	5–7 August	"Unknown Brother"	Bittereinder, Black Hotels, Dan Patlansky, David Kramer, Desmond & the Tutus, Die Antwoord, Die Heuwels Fantasties, Fuzigish, GoodLuck, Harpdog Frost, Hot Water, Isochronous, Jax Panik, Josie Field, Karen Zoid, Lark, Michelle Shocked, Mr Cat & The Jackal, Not My Dog, Oros in 'n Lang Glas, Red Huxley, Sipho "Hotstix" Mabuse, Sisqó, Southern Gypsy Queen, Sum 41, The Used, Tidal Waves, Van Coke Kartel, Wrestlerish, Zebra & Giraffe
2012	9–11 August	SWEET\THING	340ml, aKING, Albert Frost & Friends, Bittereinder, BLK JKS, Buckfever Underground, Bullet for My Valentine, Crystal Park, Desmond & the Tutus, Diplo, Eagles of Death Metal, Enter Shikari, Flash Republic, Fokofpolisiekar, Gert Vlok Nel, Graeme Watkins Project, Jack Parow, Karen Zoid, Knorkator, Kongos, Livy Jeanne & Albert Frost, Newtown Knife Gang, Seether, Shadow Club, Southern Gypsy Queen & Friends, Taxi Violence, Tidal Waves, Valiant Swart, Yoav
2013	8–10 August	Bewilderbeast	Albert Frost, Andra, Arno Carstens, Bittereinder, Black Cat Bones, Chris Letcher, Cortina Whiplash, Crashcarburn, Dan Patlansky, Deftones, Die Heuwels Fantasties, Finley Quaye, Fokofpolisiekar, Fuzigish, Gangs of Ballet, Gerald Clark, Jack Parow, Jesse Clegg, Kidofdoom, Koos Kombuis, Laurie Levine, Oros in 'n Lang Glas, Manchester Orchestra, Mango Groove, Pestroy, Red Huxley, Robert DeLong, Short Straw, Shadow Club, Stefan Dixon, Straatligkinders, Tailor, The Narrow, Toya Delazy, Yellowcard
2014	7–9 August	Odyssey	aKING, Albert Frost & Dan Patlansky, Aloe Blacc, Ard Matthews, Birth of Joy (NL), Bittereinder, Boargazm, Bright Lights Big City, Cassper Nyovest, Cat Power, Editors, Gangs of Ballet, Gert Vlok Nel, Grassy Spark, Holly & The Woods, Hugh Masekela & Ollie Viljoen, Man As Machine, Matthew Mole, Mr Cat and the Jackal, Newtown Knife Gang, Rival Sons (US), Sarah Blasko (AU), Schalk Joubert Band, Shortstraw, Spoek Mathambo, Springbok Nude Girls, Squeal, Tatran (IL), Taxi Violence, The Fake Leather Blues Band, The Fishwives, The Inspector Cluzo (FR), Urban Creep, Valiant Swart & Friends, Van Coke Kartel, Willy Mason (US), Wolfmother (AU), Wonderboom, Wrestlerish, Zebra & Giraffe
2015	7–9 August	The Fantastic Mr. Vos Vos	Gogol Bordello, Johnny Clegg, Livingstone, Brand New, Twin Atlantic, The Parlotones, Francois Van Coke, Karen Zoid, aKING, Tweak, Felix Laband, ShortStraw, Crystal Park
2016	5–7 August	The Unsea	August Burns Red, Yelawolf, KONGOS, Prime Circle, Bittereinder, Boargazm, Jack Parow, Newtown Knife Gang, Scarlotte Will, Wonderboom, Valiant Swart, Willim Welsyn, Crystal Park, The Lectric Monks
2017	5–8 October	Me now, the Mango Picker	Flume (AU), Black Coffee, Two Door Cinema Club (NI), Francois Van Coke, The Naked and Famous (NZ), Mafikizolo, Beatenberg, Desmond and the Tutus, Die Heuwels Fantasties, The Black Cat Bones, Timo Odv, Chunda Munki, Fuzigish, The Muffinz, Nomadic Orchestra, Thor Rixon, Tha Cutt, Easy Freak, Hellcats, 2Lee Stark, The Kiffness, Bouwer Bosch, Martin Rocka and the Sick Shop, The Tazers, Deon Bakkes and the Stolen Horses, Yo Grapes, Adelle Nqeto
2018	9–11 August	Nomakanjani	Bad Peter, BLK JKS, Cockles, Crashcarburn, Die Horries, Die See, DJ Bob, Fokofpolisiekar, Frame Janko, Good Luck, Hellcats, Kwesta, Ohgod, Retro Dizzy, SDO, Sho Madjozi, Silvaback & the Midnight, Southern Wild, Spoegwolf, Stiff Pap, Stoker, Strait-Jackal, Sun Xa Experiment, The Barbosa Experience, The Black Cat Bones, Trancemicsoul, Van Pletzen, Vulvodynia, Wonderboom, #SOZLOL

Easter Festivals
Year	Name
1998	African Savannas Easter
1999	Ontlont!
2000	How's Your Mother?
2001	Patrolliehond
2002	Willie Smit
2003	If Not Tomorrow, Then The Next Day
2004	Oppikoppi 10: You Check The Level, The Level Is Fine With Me
2005	Dust on My Meerkat
2006	Haat My Want Ek Vrees My Hasie
2007	More Than Somewhat
2008	VMMIJDKWMKAHOID’nAPMWEMP
2009	Strictly Come Twakkie (Not quite Easter festival)

Other Festivals
Year	Name	Occasion
1995	New Year's Bushveld Jol	New Year's Eve
1996	Moerrit Boetie New Year's Jol	New Year's Eve
1997	Inni Tanne New Year's Jol	New Year's Eve
2003	Beetroot	–
2012	One Night in Cape Town	Cape Town leg of Oppikoppi featuring headlining performers
2013	One Night in Cape Town	Cape Town leg of Oppikoppi featuring headlining performers
2013	Post aKOPPIlyptic Punk Picnic	Billy Talent performance
2014	Original Voices	Cape Town leg of Oppikoppi featuring international performers
2014	One Night in Cape Town	Cape Town leg of Oppikoppi featuring headlining performers

== See also ==
- In The City
- Music of South Africa
- Splashy Fen
- RAMFest
