= The Independent Armchair Theatre =

Live music venue in Cape Town, South Africa

The Independent Armchair Theatre (aka The Armchair) was a live music venue in Cape Town, South Africa.

The Armchair opened in 1998 and hosted many different forms of live entertainment, including live music, comedians, film festivals, plays and exhibitions. The theatre closed in 2008. The venue was originally run by Carl Reynolds and Jess Morgan before being taken over by musician Gil Hockman in 2005.

South African artists that performed at the venue included: Freshly Ground, Goldfish, Fokofpoliesiekar, The Buckfever Underground, Waddy Jones, Chris Letcher & Matthew vd Want, Fuzigish, 340ml, Valiant Swart, Chris Chameleon, Cassette, Bed On Bricks, Blk Sonshine, The Dirty Skirts, Mikanic, Lithium, Lark, KidOfDoom, Unit.r, Robin Auld, Guy Buttery, Closet Snare, Microstripe, The Rudimentals, 7th Son, The Most Amazing Show, Tidal Waves.

International artists that performed at the venue included: Rodrigues, Jose Gonzalez, Missy Higgins, K's Choice, Scratch

On 20 April 2007, Wikipedia co-founder Jimmy Wales, along with Larry Lessig (Founder of Creative Commons) took part in an event at The Armchair as part of the Free Culture tour organised by iCommons.
