= RAMFest =

South African music festival

- Genre: Various alternative genres including metal, rock, punk, hardcore, drum and bass, electronic
- Dates: Annually in February/March
- Locations: Cape Town, Durban, Johannesburg and Port Elizabeth.
- Years active: 2007–present
- Founders: Dawid Fourie
- Website: ramfest.co.za

RAMFest is a music festival that took place a couple of times in South African cities. RAMFest caters to electronic and rock music, that offers local acts as well.

== Background ==
RAMFest was started by Dawid Fourie in 2007 in Worcester, Western Cape, South Africa featuring 20 local talents. Since then RAMFest has grown to multiple South African cities and was one of the largest music festivals in the country. The "RAM" in RAMFest stands for Real Alternative Music according to Fourie, thus making the full name of the festival the Real Alternative Music Festival.

== Previous editions ==
- 2007 – Twisted Playground (2 – 3 March) in Cape Town only.
- 2008 – Beyond Boundaries (29 February – 2 March) in Cape Town only.
- 2009 – Nekkies (27 February – 1 March) in Cape Town only.
- 2010 – The Real Alternative Music Festival (26–28 February; 6 March) in Cape Town and Johannesburg respectively.
- 2011 – RAMFest (4–5 March; 9 March; 12 March) in Cape Town, Durban and Johannesburg respectively.
- 2012 – A Day of Thunder (2 March; 3 March; 9 March; 10 March; 11 March) in Port Elizabeth, Bloemfontein, Durban, Johannesburg and Cape Town respectively.
- 2013 – Red Heart Rum presents: RAMFest (7–10 March; 8 March; 15 March; 15 March; 15–16 March) in Cape Town, Durban, Port Elizabeth, Durban (again) and Johannesburg respectively. The first Durban show was for electronic acts while the second was for rock and metal acts.
- 2014 - Red Heart Rum presents: RAMFest (6–9 March) in Cape Town and Johannesburg.
- 2019 - Halloween presents: RAMFest (16 June) in Pretoria.
- 2020 - Standard Bank presents: RAMFest (13 March) in Cape Town, RAMFest (14 March) in Pretoria.
- 2023 - RAMfest (1 September) in Cape Town, RAMfest (2 September) in Pretoria.

== Performers ==
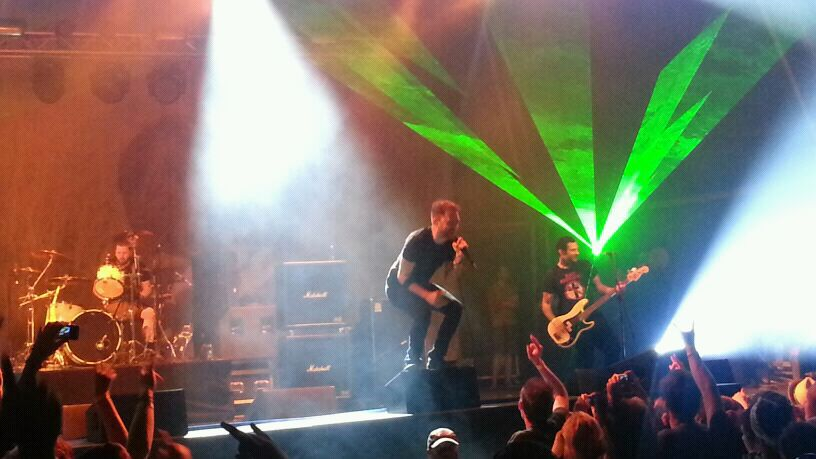
Rise Against live in Johannesburg, South Africa as part of RAMFest 2013.

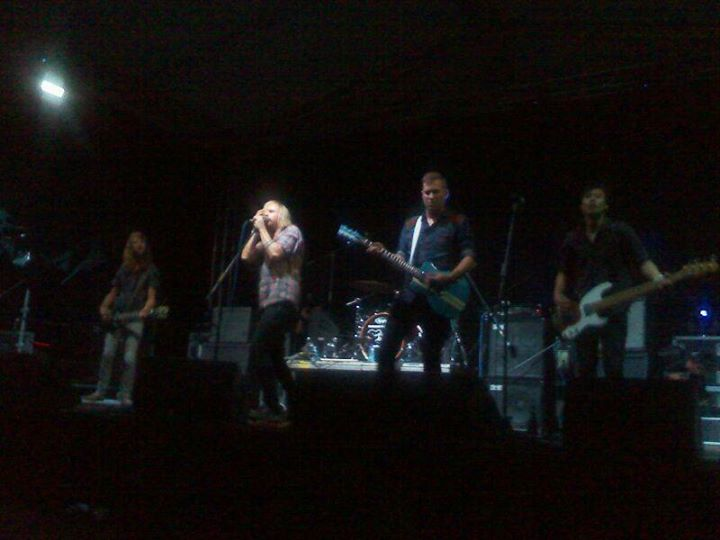
Taxi Violence live in Johannesburg, South Africa as part of RAMFest 2014.

The following table lists the notable artists that have performed at RAMFest.

Artist	Year Performed	References
Fokofpolisiekar		
Battery 9	2007, 2008, 2009	
The Awakening	2007, 2008	
aKING	2008, 2009	
Die Antwoord	2009, 2011	
Foto na Dans	2009	
Van Coke Kartel	2009, 2011, 2013	
Isochronous	2009, 2011	
Pendulum	2010, 2013	
Jack Parow	2010, 2013, 2023	
The Narrow	2010, 2012	
Boo!	2010	
Johnny Foreigner	2010	
Die Heuwels Fantasties	2010	
Alkaline Trio	2011	
Funeral for a Friend	2011	
Zebra and Giraffe	2011	
Awolnation	2012	
In Flames	2012	
Infected Mushroom	2012	
Netsky	2012	
BEAST	2013	
Man As Machine	2013, 2014	
Rise Against	2013	
Bring Me the Horizon	2013	
Taxi Violence	2014	
Biffy Clyro	2014	
Trivium	2014	
Foals	2014	
Killswitch Engage	2014	
Camo & Krooked featuring Dynamite MC	2014	
Junkyard Lipstick	2014	
Atilla	2019	
The Black Dahlia Murder	2020	
Enter Shikari	2023	
The Ocean Collective	2023	

== Controversies ==
In 2012, a chain mail was circulated, implying that RAMFest had a Satanic involvement. As a result, RAMFest had trouble organising another venue for the Bloemfontein leg of the fest and it was cancelled there due to pressure from religious groups.

In December 2012, the metalcore band As I Lay Dying pulled out from the RAMFest 2013 line-up due to being double booked to support The Devil Wears Prada on their tour. The Devil Wears Prada's tour dates conflicted with RAMFest 2013's dates, making it impossible for As I Lay Dying to have performed at Ramfest 2013.

During Bring Me the Horizon's set at the Johannesburg leg of the festival for 2013, tear gas was thrown into the crowd which caused fans to cough and tear up.

RAMFest announced that the 2015 edition of the festival was cancelled, citing the lack of suitable acts for the line up as the reason for its cancellation.

RAMFest announced that the 2016 edition will not feature any international acts, and cancelled the festival.

== See also ==
- In The City
- Oppikoppi
- Musical Performance
- Music of South Africa
- Splashy Fen
