= Dorp (band) =

- Origin: Cape Town, South Africa; London, UK
- Genres: Alternative rock, Electronic (Post 1999); Ska punk, Trip hop, Maskanda (Pre 1999)
- Years active: 1992–2008
- Label: Caned & Able
- Members: Pieter Bezuidenhout; Kevin Kieswetter; Fred Caïou; Rick Walsh
- Past members: Myburgh Grobbelaar; Albert (Frost) Loubser; David Poole; Dylan Kemlo; Timothy Rankin; Alan Bainbridge; Derrek Gripper; Douglas Armstrong; DJ Shane; Rob Driver
- Website: www.dorp.co.uk

Dorp was a South African rock band based in London, England.

== History ==
=== Formation ===
The band was formed in 1992 under its previous name, The Fauves, by Myburgh Grobbelaar (vocals), Albert Loubser (guitar), Dylan Kemlo (bass guitar), Timothy Rankin (drums) and David Poole (saxophone) at Parel Vallei High School in Somerset West.

In 1995 guitarist Albert Loubser (later known as Albert Frost) left the band to join The Blues Broers and was replaced by Alan Bainbridge. The band then changed its name to Dorp, the most recent name. Shortly thereafter, vocalist Myburgh Grobbelaar departed and was replaced by Pieter Bezuidenhout, the most recent frontman.

In 1996, Dorp released its first album, Indigenous Jewellery, independently, on a label set up by Bezuidenhout, Oom Gert Records. The band changed guitarists once more; Alan Bainbridge left and was replaced by most recent guitarist Kevin Kieswetter.

The band recorded its second release, a 5-track EP called Five Steps Off The Pacemaker in 1997 on Wildebeest Records. The band released its third disc in 1998, Danger Gevaar Ingozi.

=== Relocation and reformation, 1999-2002 ===
In 1999, the band relocated to London. After three members departed the band, Bezuidenhout and Kieswetter added Fred Caïou (later known as Fred KU). The three-piece band recorded an EP, called Boy/Girl.

The band released its 3rd full-length album in 2002 called Tap into the System on their own label, Contains Nuts Records. Later, the band added a drummer, Rob Driver.

=== Humans Being, 2008 ===
Dorp released the album Humans Being on 15 September, 2008.

Dorp disbanded at the end of 2008.

== Band members ==
=== Most recent ===
- Pieter Bezuidenhout – lead vocals, rhythm guitar (1996–2008)
- Kevin Kieswetter – lead guitar, backing vocals, bass guitar, keyboard (1997–2008)
- Fred KU – DJ, decks, synthesizer (1999–2008)
- Rick Walsh – drum kit (2008)

=== Former ===
- Rob Driver – drums, keyboards, backing vocals (2000–2008)
- Myburgh Grobbelaar – vocals (1992–1995)
- Albert Frost – guitar (1992–1995)
- David Poole – saxophone, clarinet, pennywhistle, backing vocals (1992–1999)
- Dylan Kemlo – bass guitar, whistle (1992–1999)
- Timothy Rankin – drums, percussion (1992–1999)
- Alan Bainbridge – drums, backing vocals (co-founder, 1995–1997)
- Derrek Gripper – viola (1998)
- Douglas Armstrong – trumpet (1998)
- DJ Shane – DJ, scratches (1998)

== Discography ==
=== Studio albums ===
Date	Title	Label
1996	Indigenous Jewellery	Oom Gert Records
1997	Five Steps Off the Pacemaker	Wildebeest Records
1998	Danger Gevaar Ingozi	Wildebeest Records
2001	Boy/Girl	
2002	Tap into the System	Contains Nuts Records
2006	Omni Present Bob E.P.	Sheer Sound CC
2008	Humans Being	Caned & Able

=== Singles ===
Release	Title	Label
2006	London Out There	Caned & Able
2007	Simon Says	Caned & Able
2008	Rollercoaster	Caned & Able
2008	Pigs Do Fly/Cops and Robbers	Caned & Able
