= Van der Want =

Van der Want is a Dutch surname. Notable people with the surname include:

- Maarten van der Want (born 1995), Dutch footballer
- Matthew van der Want (born 1972), South African singer-songwriter
- Jeremy Van Der Want (born 1976), South African visual artist
- Vincent van der Want (born 1985), Dutch rower

== See also ==
- Van der Walt
