= Radio Kalahari Orkes =

South African band

Die Radio Kalahari Orkes (English: The Radio Kalahari Orchestra) is a South African band, fronted by actor Ian Roberts, performing a mix of musical styles, focusing on Cape Malay and traditional Afrikaans styles. With authentic acoustic instruments such as tin guitar, harmonica, banjo, mandolin, violin and accordion, they had by 2011 produced the albums Stoomradio, Die Nagloper, Opgestook, Heuningland, and a "greatest hits" album, Grootste Treffers. In 2017 a new album came out, Mamba. Their collaborations include work with Chris Chameleon, Valiant Swart and Jack Parow, and they sometimes perform songs by Rian Malan.
