= Fourth Son South =

South African band

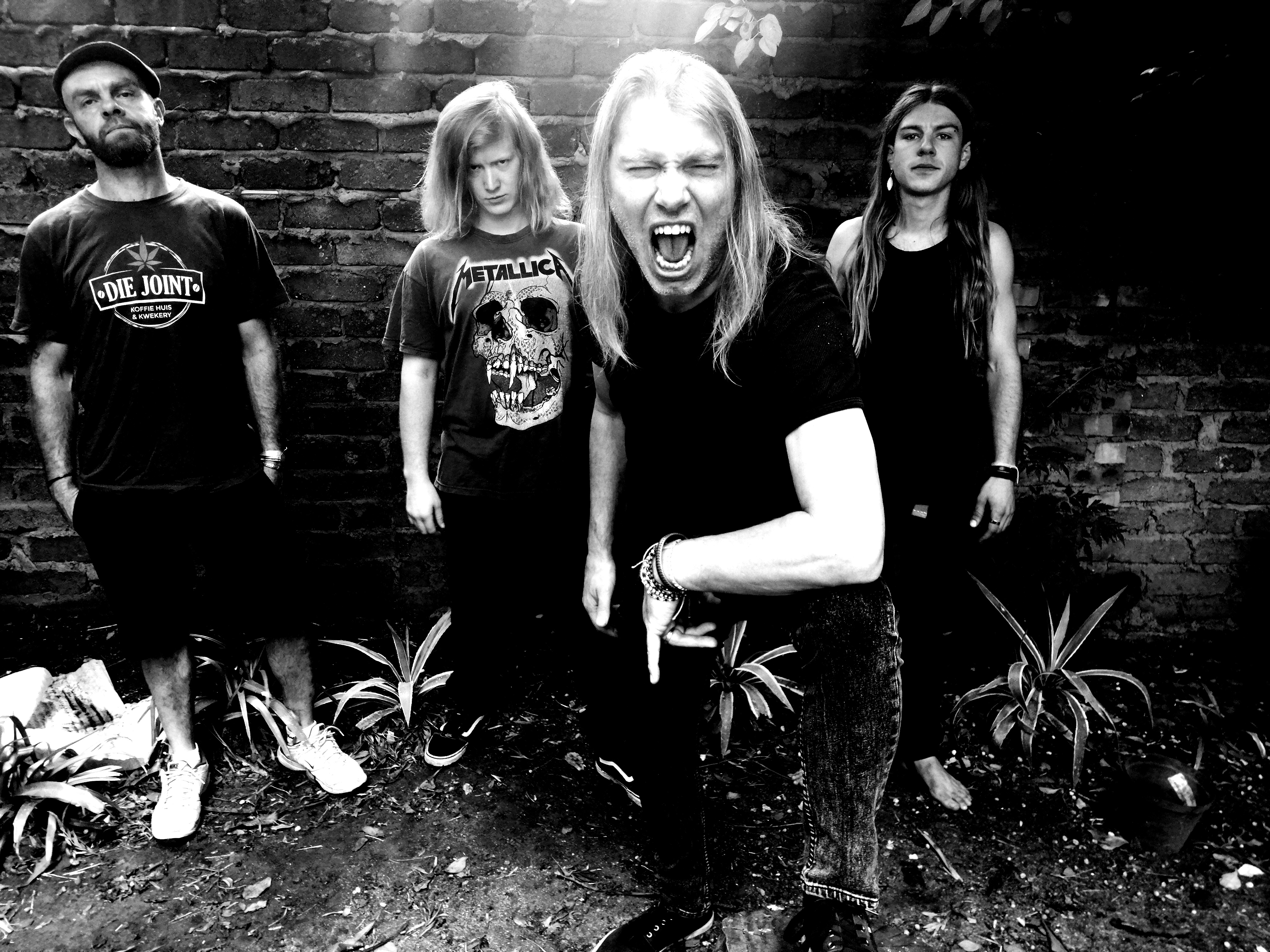
- Fourth Son South, Photo:Alouise Jamneck

Background information
- Origin: Pretoria, South Africa
- Genres: Rock; Classic rock; rock and roll; Blues
- Years active: 2020–present
- Members: Peter Toussaint; Franco Jamneck; Carel Viljoen; Dale McHardy

Fourth Son South is a South African band formed by Dutch born Peter Toussaint. After bringing out his solo album One Day in 2018, Peter brought together bass player Franco Jamneck and drummer Carel Viljoen. As a three-piece they toured for a while under the name Peter T Band.

== Band history ==
At the end of 2019 the band started recording their EP Another Mile. When the EP was ready for release in April 2020, the band name Fourth Son South was chosen. Having three elder brothers and hailing from The Netherlands, Peter was the Fourth Son, going South. Due to COVID-19 lockdowns, the band had to cancel all touring plans. Peter wrote and recorded a bunch of songs that formed the basis of their first full-length album titled The Sounds Around Your Head. When rehearsals could resume the band recruited guitarist Dale McHardy to perfect the live sound. The Sounds Around Your Head was released in November 2020 and received well around the world. In July 2021 the band released the single Hold On with plans of another EP still in 2021.

== Discography ==
- Another Mile EP (2020)
- The Sounds Around Your Head (2020)
- Hold On Single (2021)

== Band members ==
- Peter Toussaint – lead guitar and vocals
- Franco Jamneck – bass and back-up vocals
- Carel Viljoen – drums
- Dale McHardy – Rhythm Guitar
