= Stoker (band) =

- Origin: Cape Town, South Africa
- Genres: Hard rock; stoner rock; alternative rock
- Years active: 2011–present
- Members: Chris De Wet Bornman; Jurgen Bornman; Redge O'Kennedy; Morgan O'Kennedy
- Past members: Joe Theron
- Website: Stoker on Facebook

Stoker (or stylised as ⚡toker) is a hard rock band from Cape Town consisting of two sets of brothers from two rural country towns in the Western Cape. The current lineup was established in 2013 when Redge (lead guitar) and Morgan O'Kennedy (drums) joined Chris (vocals, rhythm guitar) and Jurgen Bornman (bass), the latter two having originally started as a three-piece with drummer Joe Theron. While establishing themselves on the local live scene over the next year, the band recorded their debut EP, Fox in a Hole, in 2014. After several single releases during 2016, they released their eponymous full-length album in early 2017 to local critical acclaim.

== History ==
"We’re [a] Rock’n’Roll band with dirty guitars and catchy vocal melodies, loud enough for head-banging and groovy enough for seductive dancing."

— Chris Bornman on Stoker's musical style

The band formed in 2011 as a three-piece rock outfit consisting of the Bornman brothers (originally from Rawsonville) and drummer Joe Theron from the band Woodstock Mafia, releasing the single "Stuck in the Alcohol". During this time they played as many shows as they possibly could, regardless of whether they were paid for them or not and according to vocalist Chris Bornman "it wasn't until our drummer at the time left the band and the O'Kennedy brothers joined the band, that we really found our sound and started to play the festival circuits." The O'Kennedy brothers, who were originally from Malmesbury and had played in several bands over the years, cemented the current line up in 2013. The band went on to perform at several local festivals including: Oppikoppi in 2014 and 2015, Up the Creek in 2015 and 2016, Ramfest in 2014, Synergy Live in 2011 and 2014, and Zeegunst in 2015.

In 2014, the band went into the studio to record their debut EP, Fox in a Hole, with recording and engineering duties undertaken by George van der Spuy of Taxi Violence. After releasing three singles with accompanying music videos in 2016, the band entered the studio that same year to start working on their first official full-length album. The eponymous album was released to local critical acclaim in February 2017.

"Evil Shaker II"
"Evil Shaker II" from Stoker's eponymous debut album demonstrates the band's attention to production and mixing.

== Members ==
Principal members

- Chris Bornman — vocals, rhythm guitar (2011—present)
- Jurgen Bornman — bass guitar (2011—present)
- Redge O'Kennedy — lead guitar (2013—present)
- Morgan O'Kennedy — drums (2013—present)

Past members

- Joe Theron — drums (2011—2013)

== Discography ==
=== Studio albums ===
- Fox in a Hole (2014)
- Stoker (2017)

=== Videography ===
- "Evil Shaker" (2016)
- "A Stranger Throne" (2016)
- "Take a Stab" (2016)
- "Forever Drive" (2017)
