= Lawrence Levine =

Lawrence Levine may refer to:

- Lawrence W. Levine (1933–2006), American historian
- Lawrence Michael Levine (born 1976), American actor, writer, and filmmaker
- Laurie Levine, English weightlifter
