= FLBB =

FLBB may refer to:

- Fédération Luxembourgeoise de Basketball (FLBB)
- Fédération Libanaise de Basketball (FLBB) or the Lebanese Basketball Federation
- The Fake Leather Blues Band (FLBB)
