= The Narrow =

South African rock band

- The Jonah Tour (Dec 2007)

Background information
- Origin: South Africa
- Genres: Hard rock Heavy Metal
- Years active: 2002–present
- Labels: The Narrow; Electromode (Distribution)
- Members: Hanu de Jong; Emile de Jong; Lias De Lange; Deon Kruger; Jow Feldtmann
- Past members: Sid

The Narrow is an alternative rock band from Pretoria, South Africa.

== Musical Style ==
The Narrow has several musical inspirations, and has been described as Hard rock, Grunge, Heavy Metal, Shoegaze, Alternative rock, Punk Rock, and Alternative Metal. The band holds a distinct South African sound, often times singing about political or social issues and personal struggles.

== Biography ==
The band was formed in 2002 by guitarists Emile and Sid, bassist Jow Feldtmann and drummer Nelius de Lange. Shortly thereafter Emile brought in his former Not My Dog bandmate Hanu de Jong as the band's vocalist, completing the line up.

In early 2003 the band released their debut album Self Conscious to wide critical acclaim and a South African Music Awards (SAMA) nomination. In June that same year founding guitarist Sid left the band and was replaced by Deon Kruger.

In 2004 the band released their follow-up album Travellers. The album earned the band their second SAMA nomination and the single "Lonely-Lonely" helped launch the band to greater recognition and popularity.

In 2005 the band remastered and re-released both their albums, with added tracks of old and new unreleased material.

After a slew of international stints the band underwent a brief hiatus in 2007 but became active again in 2008.

In 2010 they released their 3rd full-length album You Don't Get to Quit, earning them their third SAMA nomination. In 2012 the band released Understated, featuring acoustic versions of previously released material.

The band are known for their intense and energetic live shows, becoming important fixtures and regular headliners of various major South African rock festivals such as Oppikoppi, Ramfest, Woodstock and Seasons Wither. The band has opened up for various international acts, including The Used, Violent Femmes, In Flames, Underoath and Deftones.

== Band members ==
- Hanu de Jong - Vocals
- Emile de Jong - Guitar
- Deon Kruger - Guitar
- Jow Feldtmann - Bass
- Nelius De Lange - Drums

Touring

- Schalk Boshoff - Drums
- Ryan Greenwood - Drums

== Discography ==
Full Length

- 2003 Self Conscious
- 2004 Travellers
- 2005 Self Conscious (special edition)
- 2005 Travellers (special edition)
- 2010 You Don't Get to Quit
- 2017 Dream of Perelandra

Singles

- 2022 Dangerous
- 2025 Dying Heart
- 2025 Euphoria

EPs

- 2004 Split
- 2006 Sharing The Turbulence
- 2015 Crocodiles

Compilations

- 2010 Definitively Recycled
- 2012 Understated (acoustic album)
