= Straatligkinders =

Afrikaans Rock band

- Origin: Potchefstroom, South Africa
- Genres: Rock; Punk; Emo
- Years active: 2006 - current
- Labels: Brettian Records, Gallo, Universal, Kanada
- Members: Bouwer Bosch (lead singer); Benjamin (Bennie) de Jager (guitarist); Hein Kruger (bassist); Ruan Kruger (drummer)

Straatligkinders is an Afrikaans rock band from Potchefstroom, South Africa.

== History ==
Straatligkinders was formed in August 2006. Close to their first gig, they recorded four songs and in December 2006 a music video. The video to “Die Beskermer” was then recorded in a factory in Potchefstroom and aired on MK89 in January 2007.

The band launched their EP launch in Potchefstroom, and later played at Thrashers Skate Park in Pretoria. From here on, visits to Pretoria and Johannesburg came weekly. In March 2007, Straatligkinders was entered into a wish list competition for Oppikoppi Easter. They won this competition on votes from the public and topped bands like Lark and Taxi Violence. This event was also broadcast on MK89 with a whole half an hour devoted to the Straatligkinders performance.

They also played at a children's festival in June 2007. In August 2007, Straatligkinders had their first tour to Cape Town and Stellenbosch. The following weekend the band played their first gig in the Free State.

“Gedagte vir die dag” was released in October 2007, when Straatligkinders released their first full-length album, Bloeisels, which is being distributed countrywide by Brettian Productions. This single was also available on the MK89 compilation CD which was distributed across South Africa from the beginning of October. The video to "Gedagte vir die dag" also spent five weeks at number one on the MK Top 10. Thus far the band has been on the Top 10 for fifteen weeks.

Straatligkinders released an album in 2008, Sweef soos 'n vuishou. In 2010, they are slated to play at the Oppikoppi festival and to release a new album.

== Verdwyn 2018 ==
On 16 November 2018 the Straatligkinders' album Verdwyn is released. The album, the band's first new offering in 6 years, comes after the release of the first single from the album, Wonder, on 2 November. The album was recorded in the band's town of origin, Potchefstoom, as well as Johannesburg and Pretoria from August 2018. The first song on the album was written in June by frontman Bouwer Bosch, and immediately the music portrayed a new direction for the band. The band continued to write the rest of the album for the following 3 months, with recording taking a total of 6 weeks. For the album, the band chose to work with 7 producers, namely Ewald Jansen van Rensburg, Carlo de Villiers, Rudolph Willemse, Peach van Pletzen, Stefan Swart, Bouwer Bosch and Johan Oelofsenn.

"The inspiration for the album was time. How much time changes people, changes life and perspectives. How we grew as people." - Bouwer Bosch. A recurrent inspiration throughout the album was the life experiences of the band members throughout the last 6 years and all the changes which come with growing up.

Straatligkinders described their main challenge with the new album as the quest to marry their heavy rock sound with more popular pop angles and melodies heard on radio today. "When it comes to music, it's not about selling out, it's about buying in so we decided to make music without compromising on our voice and what we want to say. Growing older you have to unlearn a lot of stuff from your younger years, so unlearning was a big part of this album with regards to the way we thought about songwriting and recording. We were just open to do things differently this time." said Bouwer.

== Kom Saam 2021 ==
August 2021 sees the release of a brand new single from STRAATLIGKINDERS, entitled KOM SAAM. The song comes after the release of their last album ‘Verdwyn’ in 2018, and is the first offering from a collection of brand new songs and collaborations to come.

The song was written in June when a producer friend of the band, Spencer Harvey sent them a song that he made for them. The music inspired the rest of the song. An exciting new sound for STRAATLIGKINDERS, the single is an invite and serious gesture at the same time. It is about admitting your flaws and that you don’t want to go through life alone anymore.

“You have laid your insecurities and weapons down. It’s just you; the stripped down raw you standing in front of something that’s feeling the same way. It’s a gut punch, but also something for the feet to move on.” says Bouwer Bosch.

With a high energy feel to it, KOM SAAM is a rock song with electronic elements tapping into the current relevant sound and genres. A crossover between punk rock and electro, old and new STRAATLIGKINDERS fans will definitely relate to this single offering a modern pop punk sound.

== Awards ==
- 2007 ATKV Lier-award, (Bloeisels)
- 2008 Sondag VAMT, Best Alternative Album, (Bloeisels)
- 2009 MK award, Best Group
- 2009 Vonk Afrikaans Music award, Best Spiritual Album,(Sweef soos ŉ Vuishou)
- 2009 Vonk Afrikaans Music award, Beste Alternative Album,(Sweef soos ŉ Vuishou)
- 2013 Ghoema award, Best Rock Album,(Konings met Verskonings)

== Discography ==
=== 2006: Maak Jou Oë Toe En Jou Hart Oop ===
1. "Klassieke Geveg"
2. "Elektriese Blomme"
3. "Genesing"
4. "Kruis My Hart"

=== 2006: Bloeisels ===
1. "Verander Die Wêreld Deur By Jouself Te Begin" - 3:52
2. "Gedagte Vir Die Dag" - 3:09
3. "Sien Is Glo..Jou Keuse - 3:44
4. "Die Beskermer - 4:05
5. "Die Avontuur Van 'n Hartbreek - 3:35
6. "Kan Ek Met Jou Dans - 3:24
7. "Bloeisels - 2:39
8. "Blanke Skaamte - 2:27
9. "Jou Seer Is Die Brug Na Iemand Anders Se Hart - 3:40
10. "Totsiens - 5:14

=== 2008: Sweef Soos 'n Vuishou ===
1. "Inleiding"
2. "Neem My Weg"
3. "Gewonde Standbeeld"
4. "Die Vrae Op Jou Arms"
5. "Die Relevansie Van Vriendskap"
6. "Desvalido (Met Koldproduk)"
7. "Swaarder As 'n Swaard"
8. "D Vir Dans En L Vir Leuns"
9. "Laat Jou Vuiste Sweef En Skree"
10. "Eerlikheid Al Maak Dit Seer"
11. "Gebrande Lippe"
12. "Die Kuns Om Eg Te Wees"

=== 2010: Lank lank Oorlede en Ses Voet Benede ===
1. "Oudisie een"
2. "Helde het ook helde"
3. "Kinderkrans"
4. "Vredevegter"
5. "Die stof wat jy los"
6. "Jy vermaak my naar"
7. "Ink asem"
8. "Prins"
9. "Hande wat dra"
10. "Reisigers"

=== 2012: Konings Met Verskonings ===
1. "Tweede handse engele"
2. "Mooier as gedigte"
3. "Fluister fluister"
4. "Trane"
5. "Voete van klei"
6. "Duiwel dans"
7. "Sketse"
8. "Petrus"
9. "Engele skree"
10. "Verlore seën "
11. "Brandwonde"

=== 2018: Verdwyn ===
1. "Verkyker"
2. "Dorings"
3. "Nikodemus (feat. Hemelbesem)"
4. "Woord Vir Woord"
5. "Wonder"
6. "Herinner (feat. Lucinda Neethling)"
7. "Krake"
8. "Wvk"
9. "Sak Sarel"
10. "Verdwyn"
11. "Ek Wil Jou Nooit Weer Sien"
12. "Verdwyn (Unplugged)"
13. "Verkyker (Unplugged)"

=== 2019: Singles ===
1. "Goliat"
2. "Asem"

=== 2020: Singles ===
1. "Storms"

=== 2021: Singles ===
1. "Kom Saam"
2. "Dapper ft. Francois van Coke"
