= Ashley Titus =

South African rapper, musician and television presenter

- Born: 28 December 1970; Bonteheuwel, South Africa
- Died: 28 November 2007 (aged 36); Cape Town, South Africa
- Occupations: Rapper, musician and television presenter
- Years active: 1980s–2007

Ashley Titus (28 December 1970 – 28 November 2007), better known as Mr Fat, was a South African rapper, musician and television presenter.

Titus was born in Bonteheuwel, Cape Flats, South Africa. He started making hip hop in the 1980s, as well as hosting a hip hop show on Bush Radio. In the 1990s he rapped for Cape Flats-based hip hop group Brasse vannie kaap, who won an audience that crossed both musical and racial boundaries, attracting hip hop and rock fans of various ethnic backgrounds; they were also noted for their prominent use of the Afrikaans language in their music. With BVK, he also became known for his strong community involvement, musical focus on Cape Flats issues, and attempts to reach out to youth imprisoned in local jails.

In the early to mid-2000s, Titus present a magazine show simply named Hip Hop for the MK89 music channel. This focussed on the South African hip hop scene while also playing videos by international artists.

== Death ==
Titus was hospitalized in October 2007 with a heart complaint brought on by his weight, but was discharged after two weeks. The following month, he was rushed back into hospital with a recurrence of the illness, but died on the morning of 28 November at Groote Schuur Hospital in Cape Town, South Africa. He was survived by his mother and grandmother. His funeral took place on 3 December at the Methodist church in Bonteheuwel.
