= Matthew van der Want =

- Born: 1972 (age 53–54); South Africa
- Occupations: Singer, songwriter, recording artist
- Labels: Tic Tic Bang; Bitchin' Pitchin

Matthew van der Want (born 1972) is a South African singer, songwriter and recording artist.

== Albums ==
Matthew van der Want's debut album, "Turn on You", was recorded in 1996 by Lloyd Ross of Shifty Records and released on the Tic Tic Bang record label in December. "Turn on You" featured several well-known South African musicians, including former African National Congress member of parliament, Jennifer Ferguson, who performed on two duets on the album, and Tananas drummer Ian Herman. Two singles from Turn on You reached the 5FM National Top 40 and several of the tracks from the album received airplay in South Africa.

In 1998 and 2002, van der Want collaborated with songwriter and composer Chris Letcher (now based in London) to release two albums. 1998's "low riding" was nominated in two categories in the South African Music Awards in the Best Rock album and Best Adult Contemporary categories. 2002's "bignity" was also nominated for Best Rock album in the 2002 South Africa Music Awards. Both albums were recorded by Lloyd Ross of Shifty Records. The acoustic duo of van der Want and Letcher were critically acclaimed and they were repeatedly hailed as two of South Africa's top singer songwriters Bignity was listed in the Mail and Guardian's top ten albums of the decade (2000–2010)

In 2002, van der Want produced a tribute album to South African Afrikanns alternative singer Koos Kombuis called "Kombuis Musiek". On that album, various South African singers performed songs authored by Koos Kombuis.

van der Want released a further solo album in 2001, called "play my way". The single off that album reached no 6 in the 5FM South African Top 40.

A best of album "the Best and Worst of Matthew van der Want" was released in 2008, containing various tracks from "Turn on You", "bignity", "low riding" and "play my way", as well as six previously unreleased tracks.

In 2012, van der Want released a further solo album called 'Outstanding' through his own label, Bitchin' Pitchin'. While the album received positive reviews in the South African press, it received little attention from radio.

== Performance ==
Van der Want performed at every Oppikoppi music festival between 1996 and 2005 and he and Chris Letcher recently made a return to South Africa's biggest music festival at the August 2011 Unknown Brother Festival. He performed at the Dranouter Folk music festival in Belgium in 1997 and at the WOMAD Festival in South Africa in 2001. van der Want has also performed several times at the Grahamstown National Arts Festival, his most recent performance being in July 2009. In 2008, van der Want participated in the Old Mutual Acoustic Encounters series at the Grahamstown National Arts Festival, collaborating with Harris Tweed (now Dear Reader) He has also played at the Splashy Fen Music Festival in 1996 and 1997. He was the support act for Lloyd Cole for his Johannesburg show in July 2006 at the Bassline in Newton, Johannesburg.

Van der Want's live performance has been described as follows: "His cutting insights into matters of the heart, and satirical take on the music industry have probably made him a few enemies, but anyone with an ounce of self respect or taste should not be able to deny the talent behind the f*** off attitude. He says what he thinks, but he does so with such frightening beauty that you can't look away."

== Features elsewhere ==
Van der Want's music was featured in the documentary about the late James Phillips "Famous for not being famous" and his song "Pianist" was used in the 2010 movie "the Bang Bang Club" starring Ryan Phillipe. Three of his songs also featured on the 1996 album "New Africa Rock" The song "Turn on You" was featured on the album "My Generation" in 1996.
