= Peter Toussaint =

Dutch singer-songwriter and musician

- Peter Toussai{nt at Otterlake Festival 2016, Foto:Derius Erasmus

Background information
- Also known as: Peter Toussaint Band
- Origin: Pretoria, South Africa
- Genres: Rock; folk rock; rock and roll; Blues
- Years active: 2016–present
- Members: Peter Toussaint; Franco Jamneck; Jason Venter
- Past members: Wim van Vuuren; Lourene Mostert

Peter Toussaint is a Dutch singer-songwriter and musician, who has been living in Pretoria, South Africa since 2003. He played with De Niro in the Netherlands.

== Band history ==
In 2003 he moved to Pretoria, South Africa where he formed The Fake Leather Blues Band, together with brothers Conrad and Franco Jamneck. In 2010, Mozambican born Pedro Barbosa formed together with Peter The Barbosa Experience and in that year he also joined Hoot 'n Anny, together with Franco Jamneck and his wife Alouise. Looking to press his own stamp, he formed the Peter Toussaint Band in 2016 with Franco Jamneck and Wim van Vuuren. In 2017 Wim stopped due to not having enough time and Lourene Mostert (Tuin Band) stepped in on bass. Franco played drums in the band until Lourene moved to Europe in 2017. In 2020 Peter formed Fourth Son South.

== Discography ==
with De Niro:

- Flushing Boulevard (1998)
- Upstairs (2000)

with Hoot 'n Anny

- Countrees (2015)

with The Barbosa Experience

- I Got no Money (2016)

As Peter Toussaint

- One Day (2017)

== Band members ==
- Peter Toussaint – lead guitar and vocals
- Franco Jamneck – bass and back-up vocals
- Jason Venter– drums

Peter Toussaint Band in 2018
