= Junkyard Lipstick =

All-female metal band

- Origin: Cape Town, South Africa
- Genres: Heavy metal, Crossover thrash
- Years active: 2011–2016
- Label: Independent
- Members: Lucinda Villain; Louise Gorman; Jo Smit; Robyn Bruwer; Katinka JvR
- Website: junkyardlipstick.com

Junkyard Lipstick were a five-piece, female metal band from Cape Town, South Africa formed in 2011. Their songs are fast-paced, catchy, bass-heavy, and their lyrics incorporate "a playful sense of humour" with an "odd but interesting amalgamation of gore and a more delicate trace of femininity." In 2016 Junkyard Lipstick disbanded.

== Performance highlights ==
The band played at the 2011 and 2012 Rock The River New Years Festivals.

In April 2012 Junkyard Lipstick travelled to Durban to perform at the Splashy Fen music festival.

In September 2012, Junkyard Lipstick participated in Rolling Stone South Africa's event entitled Rolling Stone Weekend.

At the end of May 2013, Junkyard Lipstick travelled to Gauteng where they played the Emalyth Arts Expo as part of their first ever Gauteng tour.

In March 2014 Junkyard Lipstick played at RAMFest.

In April 2015, Junkyard Lipstick travelled to Gauteng to play Africa's largest ever Heavy Metal concert, Witchfest.

August 2015 marks the band's debut performance on the Metal4Africa Winterfest line-up.

Junkyard Lipstick was chosen as the main support act for the Cape Town leg of Aborted's South African Tour August 2015 . This would be the first time an all-female act supports an international metal band on a South African stage.

== Studio releases ==
=== Albums ===
- Hellbent – (March 2013)
- Repulsive Judgement – (September 2016)

=== EPs ===
- The Butcher's Delight – (March 2014)

=== Singles ===
- "Damned in the Deep South" – (January 2015)
- "Trafficked & Tortured" – (January 2016)

== Band members ==
Current members

- Lucinda Villain − Drums (2011–2016)
- Louise Gorman − Guitar (2012–2016)
- Robyn Bruwer − Guitar (2015–2016)
- Jo-mariè Smit − Vocals (2015–2016)
- Katinka Janse van Rensburg − Bass (2016–2016)

Former members

- Wendy Acton Burnell − Vocals (2011–2012)
- Lilian Fairall − Bass (2011–2012)
- Cami Scoundrel − Guitar (2011–2011)
- Chelsy Theron − Guitar (2011+2012)
- Jacky Roodt − Bass (2012–2015)
