= Intervensie =

Studio album by Foto na Dans
- Released: July 1, 2008
- Genre: Indie rock, progressive rock
- Length: 68:23
- Label: Rhythm Records
- Producer: Self-produced

Intervensie is the first studio album by progressive indie rock band Foto na Dans. The album was nominated for a SAMA (South African Music Award)

== Track listing ==
1. Betwyfel Beweging
2. Oorywerige Gelowige
3. Intervensie
4. Hou Jou Hande Bymekaar
5. Soldaatvolk (Akoesties)
6. Vergeet Van My
7. Die Wals
8. Die Ligte Skadu
9. Met 'n Laaste Asem
10. Verkleur En Vermom
11. Oggendstilte
12. Oorwinning Sonder Prys
