= Man As Machine =

- Origin: Johannesburg, South Africa
- Genres: Alternative Rock
- Years active: 2008-present
- Members: Rob Visser; KJ Forde; Xavier Knox; Norden Hartman
- Website: www.manasmachine.com

Man As Machine is an alternative rock band from Johannesburg, South Africa founded in 2008. Their debut album Nothing But A Thing was released in 2011 and their follow-up album Patterns was released in 2015. The band currently consists of bassist Xavier Knox, drummer KJ Forde, guitarist Norden Hartman, and singer Rob Visser.

== History ==
=== Early history (2008-2010) ===
The band was founded in 2008 as a result of Telkom's failed Do Band Up competition, which had a format similar to that of Big Brother's except that all the contestants were musicians that were required to perform together. During the two year period thereafter, they released an EP called What Makes A Man.

=== Nothing But A Thing (2011) ===
In 2011, Man As Machine released their debut album Nothing But A Thing, which received generally positive reviews. On 22 October 2012, the music video for Burnout was released. On 14 July 2013, the music video for Control was released. The band performed at RAMFest's 2013 and 2014 legs as well as Oppikoppi Odyssey in 2014.

=== Patterns (2015) ===
On 5 August 2014, Man As Machine released a new music video for the song Force, which alludes to Star Wars with lyrics mentioning Midichlorians as well as the Force. On 14 September 2014, the band announced via their Facebook page that they were working on their second album. It was confirmed in an interview that the new album would be slated for a 2015 release. The album was released on 3 March 2015 with the title Patterns. In a separate interview, the band hinted at heavy touring for the new album as well as possible dates in Australia or Europe. It was announced that Man As Machine would perform as a support act for one of Dead Letter Circus' South African dates in November 2014. Dave Grevler of Anti Motion Studios produced the album and Dead Letter Circus' guitarist Clint Vincent mastered it.

== Members ==
Rob Visser - Vocals and rhythm guitar
Xavier Knox - Bass guitar
KJ Forde - Drums
Norden Hartman - Lead guitar

== Musical style ==
Man As Machine's music is often referred to as alternative rock, grunge, or hard rock. Rob Visser's vocal technique and style is often compared to that of Chris Cornell's from Soundgarden and Audioslave fame. Xavier Knox' bass playing has been likened to that of Rage Against the Machine's Tim Commerford. Musically, the band has also been compared to Wolfmother and Alter Bridge.
