= The Fat Lady Sings: Best of the Springbok Nude Girls 1995–2001 =

The Fat Lady Sings - Best of the Springbok Nude Girls 1995–2001

Studio album by Springbok Nude Girls
- Released: October 2001
- Label: Epic

Springbok Nude Girls chronology
Relaxzor (2000)	The Fat Lady Sings - Best of the Springbok Nude Girls 1995–2001 (2001)	Goddank Vir Klank 1994 - 2004 (2004)

The Fat Lady Sings - Best of the Springbok Nude Girls 1995–2001 is a compilation album from the South African alternative rock band Springbok Nude Girls. It was released in 2001 by Epic records in South Africa.

== Track listing ==
No.	Title	Length
1.	"Lonely"
2.	"Blue Eyes"
3.	"Unworldly Beauty"
4.	"Bubblegum On My Boots"
5.	"Little"
6.	"Genie"
7.	"Giant Love Affair"
8.	"Managing Mula"
9.	"Baby Murdered Me"
10.	"Smiley Skull Of Faith"
11.	"J59"
12.	"I Love You"
13.	"Horizontal Landscape"
14.	"Dimmer"
15.	"Shot"
16.	"Supergirl"
17.	"X"
18.	"Spaceman"
