= Brasse Vannie Kaap =

South African hip-hop group

Background information
- Origin: Cape Town, South Africa
- Genres: Hip hop, rap
- Years active: 1996–2006
- Labels: Ghetto Ruff, KMD
- Past members: Mr. Fat; Garlic Brown; DJ Ready D DJ Azuhl

Brasse Vannie Kaap (BVK) was a hip-hop group from the Cape Flats in Cape Town, South Africa. They rapped predominantly in the Cape Flats dialect of Afrikaans. The original line-up included Deon Daniels (Boeta-D), Roger Heunis (Hamma), Ashley Titus (Mr Fat) and Enver Pietersen (DJ E20). Bboys Cheeze, Baby-L and Levi joined the group soon after they started to perform live.

Their debut album was a self-titled project named BVK and was released through Ghetto Ruff Records in 1997. This album became successful on the Afrikaans music circuit with tracks like "Fords Nissans Toys en Beetles (FNTB)", "Jy smaak my", "Kaap van storms", and many others getting high rotation on radio stations all over the country. It also received a South African Music Awards (SAMA) nomination for best hip hop album in 1998.

Their second album titled Yskoud was released in 2000. They became one of the most booked hip hop acts in the country and toured consistently for close to 6 years. Yskoud was also nominated for a SAMA award in 2001. DJ E20 left the band soon after the release of BVK and was first replaced with DJ Big Dre. DJ Big Dre's appearance in the band was short-lived and he was replaced by DJ Azuhl.

BVK was the first band to part take in the international exchange initiative between Belgium music festival Pukkelpop and South African music festival Oppikoppi in 2000. Hamma left the band in 2001. His replacement was Garlic Brown a.k.a. Judah. Even with their hectic tour schedules, the band still found time to engage in community out-reach projects, charities and workshops.

Mr. Fat (Ashley Titus) died on November 27, 2007, from heart complications.

Garlic Brown continues to perform as a solo artist and as a member of the hip-hop collective the League Of Shadows, and appeared on Die Antwoord's 2009 debut, $O$. Hamma went on to become a scratch DJ/turntablist and recently release his debut project titled CTRL-ALT-DEL. Boeta-D a.k.a. DJ Ready-D is currently hosting a radio show on Cape Town based radio station Good Hope FM (GHFM) and is also active in the motor car scene(drifting and modified cars).

BVK and Prophets of da City are credited with pioneering Afrikaans hip-hop in Cape Town, South Africa, during the early to late 1990s and paved the way for both hip-hop and kwaito artists to rap in languages other than English. In other words, they set the scene for 'rapping in the vernac' in South Africa and validated non-standard dialects Afrikaans, Zulu, Sotho and Xhosa via their performances and collaborations across cultural and linguistic divides. Ironically, many black working class artists from townships, like Mitchells Plain and Bonteheuwel, have yet to convert their cultural expression and art into the sort of commercial success that is now enjoyed by Die Antwoord in the international arena, which has been fascinated by Die Antwoord's performance of coloured and white Afrikaans working-class stereotypes.

== Discography ==
- BVK (1997)
- Yskoud (2000)
- Super Power (2004)
- Ysterbek (2006)
