= Wonderboom (band) =

South African band

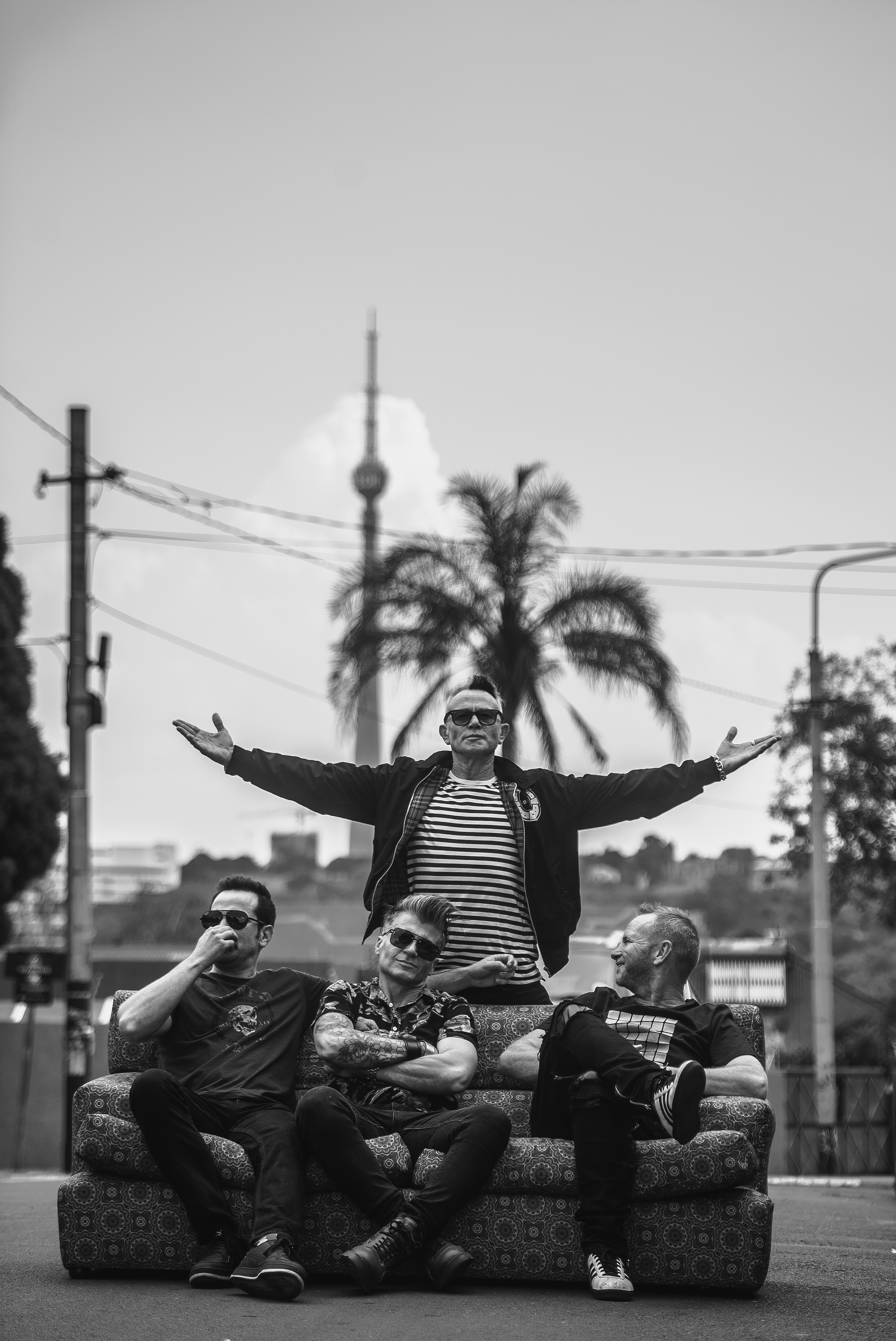
- The band, circa 2026, by Daniel Craig Johnson

Background information
- Origin: Johannesburg, RSA
- Genres: Rock, alternative rock, funk rock, kwaito rock, afro rock, ska, hip hop
- Years active: 1996–present
- Members: Martin Cito Otto - vocals; Martin Schofield - guitar; Wade L Williams - bass; Jonathan Bell - drums
- Past members: Danny de Wet (1996-2009); Garth McLeod (2009-2013)
- Website: www.wonderboom.co.za

WONDERboom is a four-piece South African rock band from Johannesburg, formed in 1996. Known for their energetic live shows and a sound that blends rock with elements of funk, punk and African rhythms, the band have remained active for three decades, releasing multiple studio albums and performing extensively across South Africa and internationally.

The group was formed when Martin Schofield (Martin Rocka), Wade Williams and Martin Otto (Cito), who had been playing together in an underground act called The Eight Legged Groove Machine, joined forces with drummer Danny de Wet of The Electric Petals. Initially performing under the name The Electric Petal Groove Machine, the newly formed band opened for Simple Minds on their South African tour just two weeks after coming together.

In 1997, while travelling near the Free State town of Kroonstad, Cito noticed a road sign pointing to a place called Wonderboom. The name was adopted and the band officially became WONDERboom.

Over the years, the band developed a reputation for their high-energy performances and eclectic songwriting. While rooted in rock, their music has incorporated funk grooves, punk influences and afro-dance rhythms. Their catalogue includes songs such as “Never Ever,” “Jafta Rebel,” “Something Wrong,” “Green Fever,” “Africa,” “Charlie,” and “It’s Great to Be Alive,” as well as later releases including “Ooh La La,” “Southern Light,” “Voodoo Doll,” and “Prodigal Son.”

WONDERboom have released nine studio albums and have received multiple South African Music Award nominations for Best Rock Album. In 2004, they won the South African leg of the Global Battle of the Bands and placed second worldwide at the international final in London. In 2017, they won the Silk Road Indie Music Festival in Chengdu, China, competing against artists from 14 countries.

In 2018, the band performed as the South African opening act for Guns N’ Roses at FNB Stadium in Johannesburg on the Not in This Lifetime tour, playing to a stadium-sized audience.

The band’s lineup has changed over time. In 2009, drummer Danny de Wet left the group and was replaced by Garth McLeod, formerly of Sugardrive. McLeod died in a motorcycle accident in 2013, after which Jonathan Bell joined the band on drums.

In 2021, the band released the retrospective compilation WONDERboom 25, marking their 25th anniversary. Approaching their 30th year, they continued releasing new material, including singles leading up to their album Hard Mode, produced with Matthew Fink.

As of the mid-2020s, WONDERboom remain active as a touring and recording act, maintaining a presence on the South African live circuit while continuing to release new music.

- Martin Cito Otto – Lead vocals, penny whistle, guitar, harmonica, multi instrumentalist.
- Martin Schofield – Guitar, backing vocals, multi instrumentalist.
- Wade Williams – Bass
- Jonathan Bell – Drums

== Discography ==
| Title | Year | Track listing |
|---|---|---|
| Is It? | 1996/1997 | 1. She Cries; 2. Smile Pantsula; 3. Bang; 4. Jafta Rebel; 5. Green Fever; 6. No Left Turn Unstoned |
| Never Ever | 2000 | 1. Never Ever; 2. Big Bash; 3. Something Wrong; 4. Running On Empty; 5. Don't Do Crime; 6. Never Ever (remix) |
| Rewind | 2001 | 1. Charlie (Ain't Slavin' 2 Da Habit) – Rabbitt; 2. Shadows 2001 – éVoid; 3. Kiss Or Kill – B World; 4. Africa – Johnny Clegg; 5. Johnny Calls The Chemist – Falling Mirror; 6. Sunday Morning (Coming Down) – Kris Kristofferson; 7. Shadows (remix); 8. Multimedia EPK track |
| Tell Someone Who Cares | 2003 | 1. Dead Right; 2. Wild Sunshine; 3. Sun Of A Gun; 4. Trippin'; 5. Night Falls Like A Grand Piano – The 6ths 6. Slow; 7. Soul Doubt; 8. White Lines; 9. Rise And Walk; 10. The Dear Hunter; 11. That Girl; 12. House Of Cards |
| Hoekom? | 2004 | 1. Royal Hotel – David Kramer; 2. Eyeshadow – Valiant Swart; 3. Engel – Karen Zoid; 4. Johnny Is Nie Dood Nie – Koos Kombuis; 5. XIXIXI – Nina Hagen; 6. Harlekyn – Anton Goosen; 7. Multimedia photo gallery |
| All The Hits? | 2005 | 1. Charlie; 2. Love Crash; 3. Jafta Rebel; 4. Shadows; 5. Never Ever; 6. Something Wrong; 7. Engel; 8. Africa; 9. White Lines; 10. Dead Right; 11. Four Keen Girls; 12. Rise & Walk; 13. Soul Doubt; 14. Green Fever; 15. Smile Pantsula; 16. Graffiti Love; 17. Eyeshadow; 18. Son Of A Gun; 19. Johnny Is Nie Dood Nie; 20. She Cries; 21. Turning; 22. Night Falls Like A Grand Piano |
| City Of Gold | 2006 | 1. It's Great To Be Alive; 2. Best Side; 3. Brain; 4. Take Me Home; 5. City Of Gold; 6. Loose End; 7. Fireball; 8. Nice Try; 9. Lovestruck; 10. E'Loop; 11. Come On; 12. Waited So Long |
| The Automatic Shuffle | 2011 | 1. Can You Feel It?; 2. Animal; 3. On The Radio; 4. Here I Am; 5. Riot; 6. Falling; 7. I Fought The Devil; 8. Karaoke Bar; 9. Superhuman; 10. Slowburn; 11. The Automatic Shuffle |
| Rising Sun | 2017 | 1. Humans; 2. Southern Light; 3. Northern Light; 4. Great Escape; 5. Hell; 6. In Place Of Something; 7. Rising Sun; 8. Ooh La La; 9. Praying Mantis; 10. Digital Dan; 11. Shark Bite |
| Hard Mode | 2024 | 1. My Name Is Freedom; 2. Deadly; 3. Alive; 4. Overground (Subway Queen); 5. Miss Demeanour; 6. Avalon; 7. Hip; 8. Prodigal Son; 9. Pretty Things; 10. Rabbit Hole; 11. Voodoo Doll |

== Awards and accolades ==
| Year | Organisation | Award | Nominated | Result |
|---|---|---|---|---|
| 1997 | SAMA | Rock Album of the year | Is It? | Nominated |
| 2000 | SAMA | Rock Album of the year | Never Ever | Nominated |
| 2001 | SAMA | Rock Album of the year | Rewind | Nominated |
| 2003 | People Mag Crystal Award | SA's Hottest band | WONDERboom | Won |
| 2004 | SAMA | Rock album of the year | Tell Someone Who Cares | Nominated |
| 2004 | KANNA Award | KKNK Toekenning Beste Rock, Pop & Jazz | WONDERboom | Won |
| 2004 | Global Battle Of The Bands | Astoria London | WONDERboom | 2nd Place |
| 2007 | SAMA | Rock Album Of The Year | FCity Of Gold | Nominated |
| 2017 | Silk Road Indie Music Festival | Sichuan Province | WONDERboom | Gold Award |
