= Foto na Dans =

South African rock band

Foto Na Dans
- Origin: Bellville, South Africa
- Genres: Progressive rock
- Years active: 2006–2012
- Label: Rhythm Records
- Members: Le Roi Nel; Alex Fourie; Neil Basson; John Havemann; Dirkie Uys
- Website: www.fotonadans.co.za

Foto Na Dans (English: Photo After Dance) was a five-piece Afrikaans progressive rock band from Bellville, South Africa, fronted by singer/songwriter Le-Roi Nel (vocals, guitar). Other band members are Neil Basson (lead guitar, vocals), John Havemann (bass), Alex Fourie (trumpet, keyboard), and Dirkie Uys (drums).

== Band formation ==
All of the band members beside Nel were previously in the band, Trompie Is Dood, which won the national highschool Afrikaans rock band competition, Rockspaaider, in 2005. Some band members from Trompie Is Dood went their separate ways which left space for a vocalist; this position was later filled by LeRoi Nel.

== Collaborations ==
The song "Afrikaans" was released by Foto na Dans in collaboration with Flash Republic and is freely downloadable from the Dans Republic website.

== Third studio album ==
The third studio unnamed studio album was announced on the band's Facebook page. The band stated that they were busy in studio, that the first single would be available mid-April 2010 and that the CD would be released in mid-May.

== Indefinite hiatus ==
In January 2012, the band announced that they would be going on indefinite hiatus in order to pursue other musical avenues. They played three final farewell shows in February 2012 entitled "Die Laaste Dans" (English: The Final Dance).

== Awards and nominations ==
Their video for the single Soldaatvolk was nominated for Best Love Scene and for Best Video, while the band is nominated for Best Group in the 2008 MK Awards. Foto Na Dans won the Best Group category after going up against the likes of The Parlotones, Springbok Nude Girls and Cassette.

Foto Na Dans was also nominated in 2008 for a SAMA (South African Music Award) for Best Afrikaans Rock Album for their debut album Intervensie.

== Discography ==
=== EPs ===
- Foto Na Dans EP - January 2007

=== Studio albums ===
- Intervensie - September 2007
- Pantomime op Herwinbare Klanke - 2008
- Die Vloed - 2010

=== Singles ===
Title	Album	Label
"Huiwerig"	Foto Na Dans EP 2007	Rhythm Records
"Soldaatvolk"	Foto Na Dans EP 2007	Rhythm Records
"Vergeet Van My"	Intervensie 2007	Rhythm Records
"Hou Jou Hande by Mekaar"	Intervensie 2007	Rhythm Records
"Natuurlik Verlig"	Pantomime Op Herwinbare Klanke 2008	Rhythm Records
"Die Vloed"	Die Vloed 2010	Rhythm Records
