= Sugardrive =

South African rock group

Sugardrive are a South African rock group.

Formed in 1994, they released five albums, headlined the major SA festivals, spawned a crop of radio hits, toured Australia on the Big Day Out tour and picked up a couple of SAMA awards. The band’s eclectic brand of soulful rock/electronica avoided easy comparisons and elevated them to the status of media darlings.

They received five South African Music Awards (SAMA) nominations of which they won three.

Composed of Paul Flynn (vocals and guitar), Michael Westwood (guitar), Gavin Wienand (bass) and Garth McLeod (drums), Sugardrive began their existence playing riff-heavy alternative rock, but later their sound shifted more towards pop, incorporating elements of electronica, dance music and jazz. Their debut album, Belly Full Under was released on cassette in 1993, and saw the band gain some attention in South Africa. The release in 1995 of the follow-up, Hey God, It's Me helped to build on their reputation. In 1996, the Snapshots EP was released, heralding a change in direction for the band. The EP saw Sugardrive move more into the trance-pop territory pioneered by Portishead, and the album following this, Sand.Man.Sky - expanded on this new direction. In 1999, Sugardrive returned with When I Died I Was Elvis, their most popular album to date.

In April 2001 the band decided to split up, with the band members each deciding to work on their own solo projects.

In 2008 lead singer Paul E. Flynn released a solo album titled 'Fields'.

Michael Westwood joined Goa Trance producer Jeff Fletcher (Splonge) to form One Mighty Atom .
