= In the City (South African festival) =

Annual music festival

In The City
- Vodacom In The City's logo.
- Genre: Alternative Rock, Indie
- Dates: 1st Friday of October
- Location: Johannesburg, South Africa
- Years active: Since 2012
- Founders: Seed Experiences
- Website: inthecityjhb.co.za

In The City is a South African, one day music festival that takes place annually in Johannesburg at the Mary Fitzgerald Square.

== Background ==
In The City was started in 2012 by Seed Experiences, the same company responsible for the Cape Town festival Rocking The Daisies. As such, both of the festivals have shared headlining acts since In The City's inception in 2012 and the first year's edition hosted Bloc Party as its international headlining act. In The City 2012 was considered a huge success as it sold out all of its tickets.

The festival is largely sponsored and endorsed by the South African telecommunications company Vodacom resulting in the festival often being called "Vodacom In The City" and "Vodacom Unlimited In The City".

== Previous editions ==
The following table displays the year, date and key performers of each year's edition of In The City.

In The City Concerts
Year	Date	Notable Acts	Attendance
2012	5 October	Die Antwoord, Tumi featuring Yesterday's Pupil, DJ Yoda, Bloc Party	10 000
2013	4 October	Skunk Anansie, Alt-J, The Hives, Boys Noize	TBC

== See also ==
- Musical Performance
- Music of South Africa
- RAMFest
- Splashy Fen
- Misty Waters
