= The Fake Leather Blues Band =

- Also known as: FLBB
- Origin: Pretoria, South Africa
- Genres: Blues, Rock
- Years active: 2003–present
- Members: Conrad Jamneck; Peter Toussaint; Franco Jamneck; Wim van Vuuren; Pedro Barbosa
- Past members: Gideon Meintjies; Nathan Smit; Riaan van Rensburg; Jaco Mans; Jonathan Peyper; Stefan Dixon

The Fake Leather Blues Band is a blues band from Pretoria, South Africa. They are also commonly known simply as FLBB.

== Band history ==
The band was formed in May 2003 during a jam session with Conrad Jamneck, Peter Toussaint, Franco Jamneck and Gideon Meintjies.

Over the years the band has had different drummers and rhythm guitar players. In the meantime, FLBB played the Oppikoppi festival several times, as well as other festivals such as the Up the Creek festival and the Strab and FORR festivals in Mozambique. As of 2018 the band has not released any albums, but they have filmed concerts that can be found on YouTube.

== Band members ==
- Conrad Jamneck – vocals
- Peter Toussaint – lead guitar and back-up vocals
- Franco Jamneck – bass and back-up vocals
- Wim van Vuuren – drums
- Pedro Barbosa – rhythm guitar
