= Gert Vlok Nel =

South African poet (born 1963)

- Born: 1963 (age 62–63); South Africa
- Occupation: Poet
- Writing career
- Language: English

Gert Vlok Nel (Beaufort West, 1963) is a South African poet. He studied English, Afrikaans and history at Stellenbosch University and worked as a guide, a bartender and a watchman. He has published one collection of poems, Om te lewe is onnatuurlik (To live is unnatural), for which he received the Ingrid Jonker Prize in 1994. His countryman Etienne van Heerden praised Vlok Nel as 'one of our finest talents'.

Om te lewe is onnatuurlik was followed by a CD, Beaufort Wes se beautiful woorde, an autobiographical sketch and a full-length show with poems, songs and visual material, which he has performed all over South Africa. Some people say he is a travelling bard with a guitar, comparable to Bob Dylan and the South African troubadour Koos du Plessis. He himself says he admires Tom Waits and Bruce Springsteen (‘Tom Waits, he messes about, just like me’).

In his début collection, Vlok Nel paints a personal portrait of his childhood in Beaufort West, a rural part of South Africa with a predominantly poor-white population. His father was a railway employee.

Vlok Nel writes his lyrics in an unusual and innovative Afrikaans, comparable with, if anything, the language experiments of Antjie Krog.

The Dutch poet Gerrit Komrij included eight of Vlok Nel's poems in his anthology of South African poetry in Afrikaans De Afrikaanse poëzie in 1000 en enige gedichten.

Gert's re-released album entered the Dutch charts at number 59 in 2006.
