= One Day (Peter Toussaint album) =

Studio album by Peter Toussaint
- Recorded: April–October 2017
- Studio: Wagon Wheel Records, Pretoria
- Genre: Rock
- Length: 43:56
- Label: Independent
- Producer: Illimar Neitz

One Day is the debut studio album by Dutch musician and singer-songwriter Peter Toussaint, who has been living in Pretoria since 2003. His first release as a solo artist, it was released on 11 December 2017. The album is an instrumental album and a concept album, musically going through a full day. As a bonus track, there is the song "Home" which follows after Moonlight.

== Critical reception ==
Initial reaction for One Day from music critics has been highly favorable. Lenore Germeshuys of The Flow described the album as "A very good listen."

Clive Fisher of Guitar Ninja wrote:"One Day is a great album created by awesome musicians..."

Pedro Barbosa of Running Wolf's Rant described the album as "chilled, melodic and relaxing."

Darren Johnston of GeoGravity wrote “‘One Day’ isn’t a string of songs loosely slapped together onto a record; it is a meticulously-curated and detail-driven thematic story, of which its songs seamlessly segue into each other.”

== Track listing ==
All tracks are written by Peter Toussaint.

No.	Title	Length
1.	"Sunrise"	4:08
2.	"A Journey"	3:49
3.	"The Forest"	3:06
4.	"Oak Trees"	3:38
5.	"Teckel Race"	2:43
6.	"Cay's Song"	3:15
7.	"Mosquito"	1:53
8.	"Sunset"	2:58
9.	"Thunderstorm"	3:45
10.	"Calm After"	3:15
11.	"Amsterdam by Night"	3:26
12.	"Moonlight"	8:08
Total length:		43:56

== Personnel ==
Taken from album liner notes.

- Peter Toussaint – acoustic and electric guitars, keyboards, vocals
- Franco Jamneck – bass guitar, trumpet
- Riaan van Rensburg – drums, percussion
- Rika du Plessis - cello
- Johan Scheppel - violin
- Illimar Neitz – producer, mixing
- Stephan Bester - mastering
