= Springbok Nude Girls =

South African rock band

- Also known as: Nudies; Nude Girls
- Origin: Stellenbosch, South Africa
- Genre: Alternative rock
- Years active: 1994–2001; 2006–present
- Label: Sony BMG
- Members: Arno Carstens; Francois Kruger; Theo Crous; Arno Blumer; Adriaan Brand

The Springbok Nude Girls (a.k.a. the Nudies, or the Nude Girls) is a rock band from Cape Town, South Africa.

An alternative rock band, the Nude Girls introduced punk rock, ska, acid jazz and heavy metal into their songs, introducing a new world of music to the youth of South Africa in the mid-to-late 1990s. Springbok Nude Girls derived their name directly from the glamour models featured on the cover sleeves of the vintage Springbok Hit Parade vinyl compilation series.

They played their first big gig in September 1994 in Stellenbosch. Since then, the Nude girls have toured extensively. In 2000, the band received a South African Music Award for Best Rock Album (Surpass The Powers). The Nude Girls were voted the Best South Africa rock band in a poll conducted by South African radio station 5FM.

== Break up and reformation ==
In 2001 the band announced an indefinite hiatus. However, in 2006, a blog entry on drummer Francious Kruger's site informally announced their reunion. Their reunion coincided with the return of trumpeter Adriaan Brand. Their first new album in four years, Peace Breaker, was released in March 2007. The Nude Girls performed as the opening act for U2 in Cape Town during their South African tour in February 2011.

== After the split ==
During the band's hiatus Arno Carstens formed a new band, Nu Porn, and also launched a successful solo career. In 2006, he won a SAMA award for his solo album The Hello Goodbye Boys, which was named Best English Adult Contemporary Album.

Guitarist Theo Crous went on to form the Afrikaans alternative band KOBUS! (also known as K.O.B.U.S!) with Francois Breytenbach Blom, ex-vocalist of South African heavy metal band Voice of Destruction. They have released three albums: kobus!, 100% Skuldgevoelvry and SwaarMetaal. Crous is also the music producer for Prime Circle, The Parlotones, aKING, Fokofpolisiekar, Karen Zoid and has collaborated with many acts such as Mafikozolo, Malaika and Loyiso Bala. Crous played live with Chris Cornell (of Audioslave and Soundgarden) at Mycoke Fest 2009.

The band got together once again in 2011 on the Isle of Wight to rehearse and record tracks for a new EP. The release appeared in December 2011 as Apes With Shades and was supported by a South African tour with Van Coke Kartel. The song Weekend was lead single and was accepted onto the 5FM playlist.

== Discography ==
- Neanderthal 1 (August 1995) (initially on Bluegum records CDSNG1, Epic)
- It Became A Weapon (October 1996) (Epic)
- be-vest@iafrica.com (1997) (Epic)
- I Love big EP (1997-03-04) (Epic)
- Afterlifesatisfaction (Epic, 1997)
- Omnisofa (April 1998) (Epic)
- OPTI MUM (November 1998) (Epic)
- Surpass the Powers (July 1999) (Epic)
- Un-E.Z. (1999) (Epic)
- Relaxzor (November 2000) (Epic)
- The Fat Lady Sings - Best of the Springbok Nude Girls 1995-2001 (October 2001) (Epic)
- Goddank Vir Klank 1994 - 2004 (July 2004) (Sony Music)
- Nude Girls (Exclusive UK release) (July 2006) (Golden Fairy Records/Sony BMG)
- Peace Breaker (March 2007) (Sony/BMG)
- Apes With Shades (December 2011) (Sony/BMG)
- Beautiful Evolution (April 2018) (Sony/BMG)
- Partypocalypse (September 2021) (Mongrel Records)
