= Dan Patlansky =

- Born: Daniel Patlansky; 12 December 1981 (age 44); Johannesburg, South Africa
- Occupations: Singer; Songwriter; Guitarist
- Musical career
- Genres: Blues; Rock music
- Instruments: Vocals
- Years active: 1997-present

Dan Patlansky is a South African blues guitarist, singer and songwriter. Patlansky opened for Bruce Springsteen in 2014. He toured in the United Kingdom in 2015, 2016, and 2023.

== Discography ==
Patlansky has released the following albums:

- Standing at the Station (1999)
- True Blues (2004)
- Real (2006)
- Move My Soul (2009)
- 20 Stones (2012)
- Wooden Thoughts (2013)
- Dear Silence Thieves (2014)
- Introvertigo (2016)
- Perfection Kills (2018)
- Shelter of Bones (2022)
- Movin' On (2024)
