= Van der Walt =

Van der Walt is an Afrikaans surname. Notable people with the surname include:

- Dawie van der Walt (born 1983), South African golfer
- Deon van der Walt (1958–2005), South African opera singer
- Eduan van der Walt (born 1987), South African rugby union player
- Jaco van der Walt (born 1994), South African rugby union player
- Lucien van der Walt (born 1972), South African sociologist, labour educator
- Nardus van der Walt (born 1992), South African rugby union player
- Piet van der Walt (born 1966), Namibian businessman and politician
- Philip van der Walt (born 1989), South African rugby union player
- Tjaart van der Walt (born 1974), South African golfer
- Wimpie van der Walt (born 1989), South African rugby union player
- Dirk van der Walt (born 2010), South African rugby player
