= Gerry Clark =

New Zealand sailor, writer and ornithologist

Gerald Stanley Clark MBE (9 May 1927 – June 1999) was a New Zealand sailor, writer and ornithologist. He is notable for his ornithological research work on subantarctic islands and for his circumnavigation of Antarctica in his self-built yacht Totorore.

== Early years ==
Clark was born in Colchester, England, and educated at boarding school and later at the Thames Nautical Training College, then known as HMS Worcester. In 1944, unable to join the Royal Navy because of a visual defect, he joined the British Merchant Navy, serving with the Union-Castle Line on the Liberty ship Samflora, and completing his cadet training during a two-year cruise without home leave. Upon discharge from the Samflora he joined the Straits Steamship Company, based in Singapore, as a junior officer on small ships trading through the islands of South East Asia.

In 1951 Clark returned to England to attend the Warsash Maritime Centre at Southampton to sit for his Master's Certificate. While he was there he married Marjorie Ellen Bates who later joined him in Singapore, where the couple had four daughters. There Clark was promoted first to captain and then to assistant marine superintendent of a fleet of fifty vessels.

== New Zealand ==
In 1958 Clark and his family moved to Kerikeri in New Zealand, where he bought the Homelands orchard. Although they struggled at first, eventually they successfully pioneered the organic farming of citrus and sub-tropical fruits in the area.

Clark also attended evening classes in boat building, building his first yacht, the 7 m Ketiga in 1968, in which he took part in the first Single-handed Trans-Tasman Yacht Race in 1970. In 1973 he sailed around New Zealand, including the Chatham, Auckland and Campbell Islands.

=== The Totorore expedition ===
The Totorore expedition was conceived as a circum-Antarctic voyage to study the seabirds of the Southern Ocean in order to further their conservation. Clark spent seven years building the 10 m yacht Totorore (the Maori name for the Antarctic prion) of kauri timber, completing and launching her in 1982.

The Totorore left Kerikeri on 26 February 1983, eventually returning on 6 November 1986, 3 years, 8 months and 16 days later, having travelled some 71,000 km eastwards, around and about the Southern Ocean and the Antarctic Peninsula, visiting numerous islands to survey and count seabirds. The most significant ornithological work was carried out in southern Chile where new colonies of several species were discovered, and in South Georgia where comprehensive and accurate counts were made of wandering albatrosses and king penguins along the long coastline. During much of the expedition Clark was accompanied and aided by one or two companions, but sometimes, as on a late leg of the voyage between Marion Island and Fremantle, Australia, he was alone and frequently imperilled by rough seas and equipment failure.

Following his return, honours received by Clark included:

- 1986 – Blue Water Trophy (Northland Harbour Board)
- 1986 – Tillman Medal for Cruising in High Latitudes (Royal Cruising Club of Great Britain)
- 1987 – Blue Water Medal (Cruising Club of America)
- 1987 – Member of the Order of the British Empire, for services to ornithology, in the 1987 Queen's Birthday Honours
- 1988 – Tequila Propeller Award (Royal Akarana Yacht Club)
- 1988 – Fred Norris Medal (Devonport Yacht Club)
- 1988 – Stolberger Memorial Award (New Zealand Yacht Club Navigators Society)
- 1988 – Fellow of the Royal Geographical Society

For the next twelve years Clark continued his interest in seabird conservation and New Zealand's subantarctic islands by making numerous trips in the Totorore to assist researchers from the Department of Conservation to count, map, and study seabirds. It was in the course of an expedition to recover satellite transmitters, used to track albatrosses breeding on the Antipodes Islands, that the Totorore disappeared on about 12 June 1999 off the south coast of Antipodes Island, along with Clark and his companion Roger Sale.

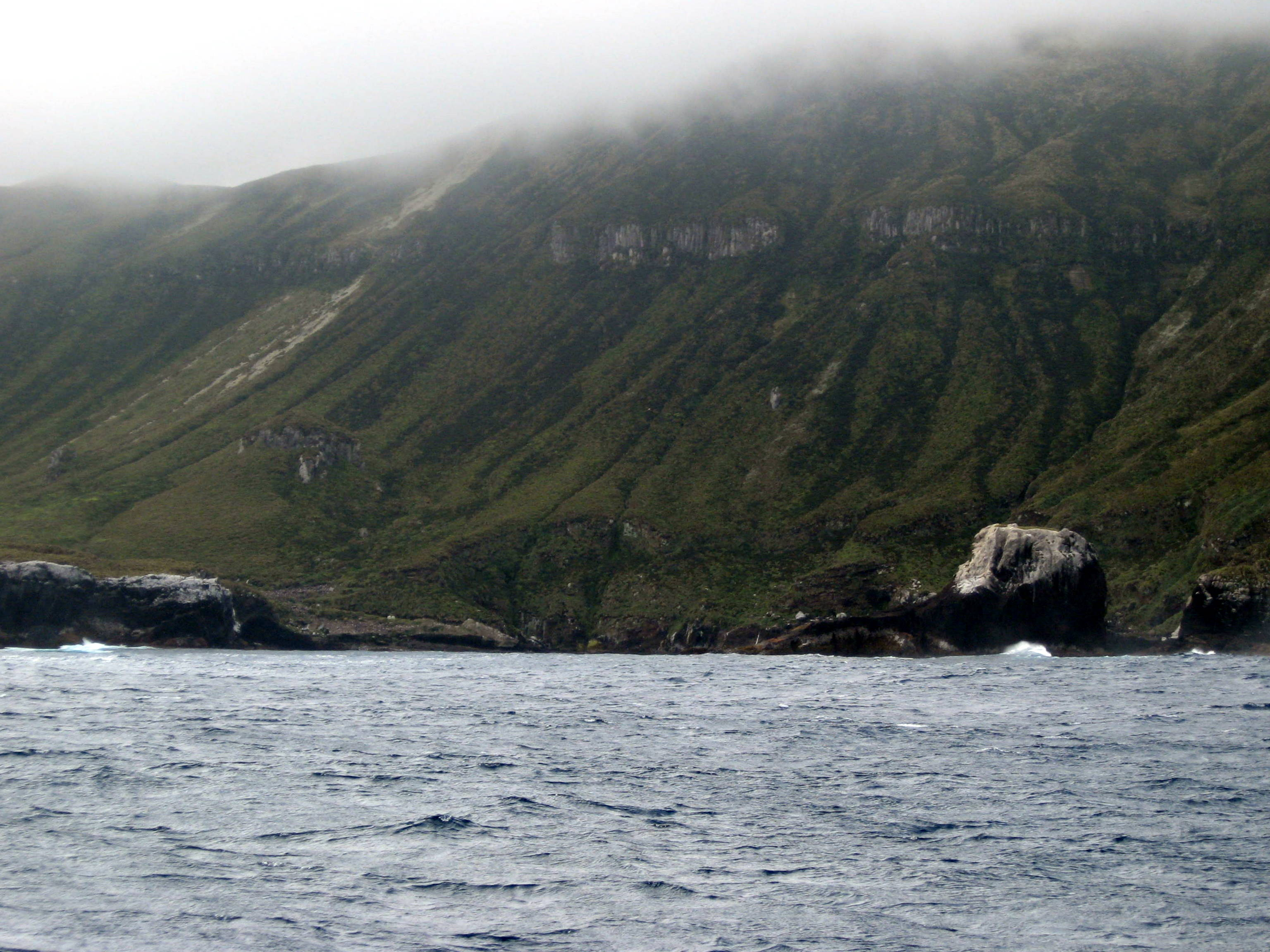
South Bay, Antipodes Island - The last known location of the Totorore

== Publications ==
Clark wrote a book, based upon extracts from his diary, about the Totorore expedition "The Totorore Voyage'’ first published in 1988 by Century Hutchinson, Auckland. He also produced reports and published papers in various journals and bulletins on his research, including:

- Clark, G. (1983). Totorore expedition to southern Chile. Australasian Seabird Group Newsletter 18: 20–21.
- Clark, G.S.; Meyer, A.P. von; Nelson, J.W.; Watt, J.N. (1984). Notes on the sooty shearwaters and other avifauna of the Chilean offshore island of Guafo. Notornis 31: 225–231.
- Clark, G.S.; Goodwin, A.J.; Meyer, A.P. von.. (1984). Extension of the known range of some seabirds on the coast of southern Chile. Notornis 31: 320–324.
- Clark, G.S. (1985). Cattle egrets near Antarctica in April. Notornis 32: 325.
- Clark, G.S. (1986). Seabirds observed in the Pacific Southern Ocean during autumn. Australasian Seabird Group Newsletter 23: 1–15.
- Clark, G.S.; Sale, C.S. (1986). Notes on the seabirds observed during the Totorore Expedition's voyage across the Drake Passage to the Antarctic Peninsula and return, April 1985. Australasian Seabird Group Newsletter 24: 5–7.
- Clark, G.S. (1987). Seabird observations between South Georgia and South Africa from a sailing vessel. Cormorant 14: 20–30.
- Clark, G.S. (1989). Cape pigeons breeding and Westland black petrels seen at Chatham Islands. Notornis 36: 51–52.
- Bourne, W.R.P.; Brooke, M. de L.; Clark, G.S.; Stone, T. (1992). Wildlife conservation problems in the Juan Fernandez archipelago, Chile. Oryx 26: 43–51.
- Clark, G.S.; Cowan, A.; Harrison, P.; Bourne, W.R.P. (1992). Notes on the seabirds of the Cape Horn islands. Notornis 39: 133–144.
- Tennyson, A.J.D.; Mayhill, R.C.; Clark, G.S. (1993). A visit to The Pyramid and the Murumurus, Chatham Islands. Tane 34: 171–179.
- Clark, G.; Amey, J.; McAllister, G. (1995). Unexpectedly large number of wandering albatrosses (Diomedea exulans) breeding on Antipodes Island, New Zealand. Notornis 42: 42–46.
- Clark, G.; Robertson, C.J.R. (1996). New Zealand whitecapped mollymawks (Diomedea cauta steadi) breeding with black-browed mollymawks (D. melanophrys melanophrys) at Antipodes Islands, New Zealand. Notornis 43: 1–6.
- Clark, G.; Booth, A.; Amey, J. (1998). The Totorore expedition to the Bounty Islands, New Zealand, October 1997 to January 1998. Unpublished report to Department of Conservation, Southland Conservancy, Invercargill. 64 pp.

== See also ==
- List of people who disappeared mysteriously at sea
