= Boo! (band) =

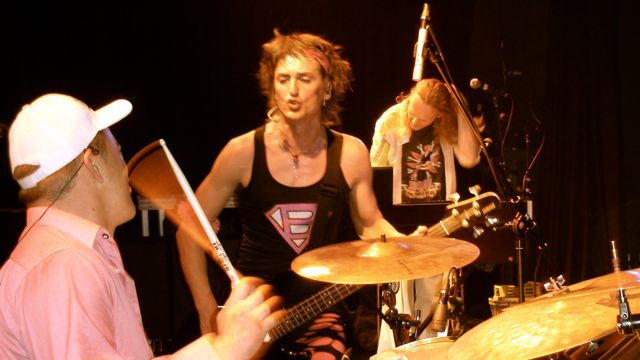
- Left to right: Riaan van Rensburg, Chris Chameleon, Ampie Omo

Background information
- Origin: South Africa
- Genres: Glam rock; punk
- Years active: 1997–2004, 2010–present
- Members: Chris Chameleon; Ampie Omo; Riaan van Rensburg
- Past members: Leon Retief

Boo! is a South African band. They describe their music as "Monki Punk". Originally Boo! consisted of three members; the cross-dressing "Miss" Chris Chameleon on bass guitar and lead vocals, Leon Retief on drums and Ampie Omo, filled in the rest of the sounds on trumpet, trombone, keyboard and percussion instruments. All music and lyrics were composed by Chris Chameleon.

The band disbanded in 2004, but reformed in February 2010.

== History ==
Boo! entered the South African music scene in October 1997, but grew especially famous in Europe. They acquired a worldwide following by performing 800 concerts in 17 countries, including 14 states in the United States. Boo! performed at many music festivals, appearing on the same stage as the White Stripes, Limp Bizkit, Slipknot, Franz Ferdinand, Cypress Hill, Coldplay and many more. In 2002, the band received a South African Music Award (SAMA) for 'Best Pop Album.'

After Boo! disbanded, Chris Chameleon went on to become a very prominent and platinum-selling solo artist, and Ampie Omo joined local band Fuzigish. Leon Retief went on to manage and book prominent South African artists.

Boo! reunited early in 2010 with a change in their line-up, replacing original drummer Leon Retief with Riaan van Rensburg. They have since recorded a new album, (The Three of Us) in the Netherlands.

"Champion"
30 Second sample recording of "Champion" from Boo!

== Discography ==
- Banana Flava (live) (cassette) [1998]
- Pineapple Flava (a.k.a. Monki Punk or Pynaple) [February 1999]
- The 3 Boo!dists [December 1999]
- Seventies, Eighties, Nineties, Naughties [October 2000]
- Shooting Star (live) [February 2002]
- TNTLC (August 2003)
- Boo! (compilation) (December 2003) free with Stage Magazine No. 24
- The Three of Us (2010)

== Gallery ==
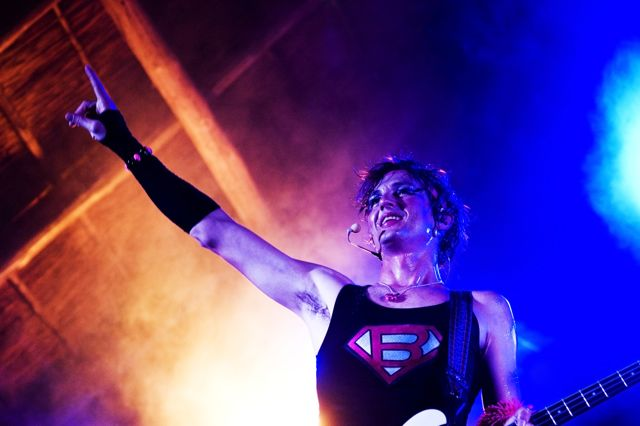
Chris Chameleon

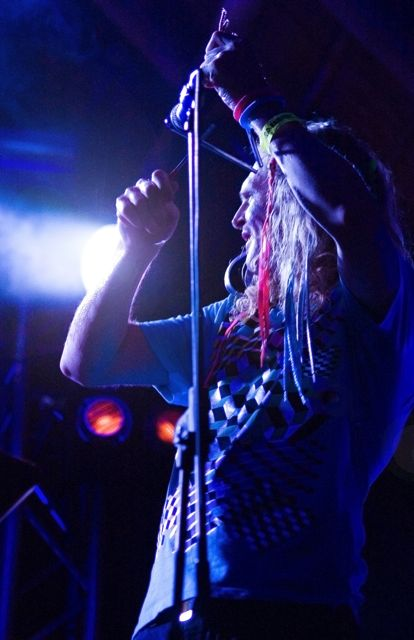
Ampie Omo
