= Urban Creep =

Urban Creep were a seminal South African rock band.

The band was formed in 1994 and recorded two critically acclaimed albums, `Sea Level` and `Tightroper`. `Sea Level` was nominated for Rock album of the year 1995 at the South African Music Industry awards. `Sea Level` and `Slow Thighs` both got to number 1 on the 5fm top 40 in 1995 and 1997 respectively.

According to well known musician and critic Dave Marks:

"Chris Letcher's finger-picking acoustic & electric guitar style, unique vocals & song writing abilities combined with the classical & maskanda strains of Brendan Jury's violin, keyboards & rock vocals, made the Creeps the urban legend & sensation they were".

The band members were Brendan Jury (viola, keyboard and vocals), Chris Letcher (guitar and vocals), Ross Campbell (drums) and Didier Noblia (bass). Ross Campbell originally drummed for the Durban band, Celtic Rumours (Slow Rain) and went on to play with Cape Town bands Fetish and Benguela. Didier and Ross were also part of Landscape Prayers with Nibs van der Spuy prior to Urban Creep.
