= Albert Frost (musician) =

South African guitarist

Albert Frost is a South African blues singer, rock guitarist and producer who has been performing since 1994. In 2017 he won the SAMA Award for Best Rock Album for The Wake Up.

He has played with The Blues Broers since 1994 at the age of 17.

== Discography ==
=== with The Blues Broers ===
- Sharp Street (1995)
- Been Around (1996)
- Cellar Tapes (1998)
- Out Of The Blue (2011)
- Into The Red (2014)

=== with Koos Kombuis ===
- Blou Kombuis (2000)
- Langpad Na Lekkersing (2016)

=== with Frosted Orange ===
- My Love Is A Leopard (2002)

=== with Arno Carstens ===
- Another Universe (2004)
- The Hello Goodbye Boys (2005)

=== with Anton Goosen ===
- Padkos (2017)

=== Solo ===
- Catfish (2002)
- Devils & Gods (2009)
- Live In Grahamstown (2013)
- The Wake Up (2016)
- Sacred Sound (2021)
