= Shortstraw =

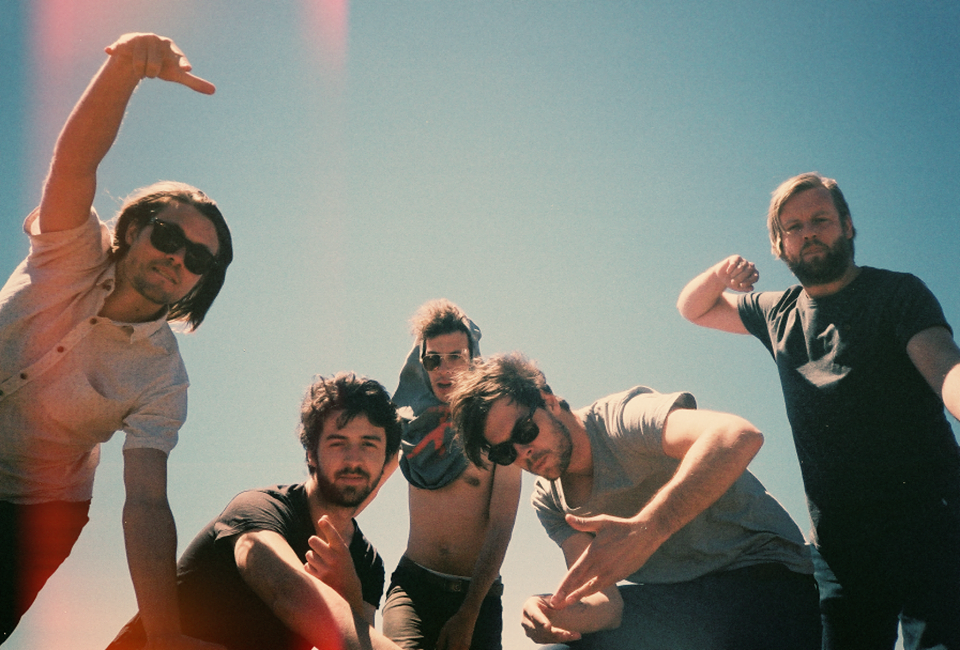

Background information
- Origin: Johannesburg, South Africa
- Genres: Indie rock
- Years active: 2007–present
- Website: shortstraw.co.za

Shortstraw is an indie rock band from Johannesburg, South Africa. Shortstraw is currently signed to their independently formed publishing label Boosh Records in South Africa, with digital distribution by Sony Music.

== History ==
The band was formed in 2007 as a two-piece consisting of Oliver Nathan (drums and backing vocals) and Alastair Thomas (lead vocals and guitar). Jason Hartford (guitar and keyboard) joined the band in 2008 and Phil Brierley (bass) later joined the band in 2009. In 2011, Jason Hartford and Phil Brierley left the band and were later replaced by Gad De Combes (keyboard and backing vocals), Tom Revington (lead guitar) and Russell Grant (bass). Jake Rubinstein replaced Oliver Nathan on drums in June 2013 to complete the current line-up

It wasn't until the recording of their first EP, We Slept Through it All in late 2008 that the group realised they needed a bassist to replicate the EP live. To solve this problem they recruited Phil Brierley in 2009 to complete the original line-up. After playing various shows across the country for the next two years, Jason Hartford and Phil Brierley left the band in 2011 to pursue personal interests. They were replaced by Gad De Combes, Tom Revington and Russell Grant to transform the band into a five-piece outfit.

Shortstraw's debut album, You're Underfed, I'm Wonderful was written, recorded and produced by the original lineup in 2011 along with friend Chris Brink who mixed and mastered the album. Tom, Gad and Russell joined the band just before the album was ready for release. The album was well received across South Africa and the video for their single "One Long Day" went to number 1 on the MK Top 10 Music Videos Chart. The band won a grant to produce a music video for their song, Waterworks through the MK Music Video Project. The Song "One Long Day" was featured in the then new Nissan X-Trail advertisement in late 2012. In 2013, the band won the Best Indie MK Award for their music video for One Long Day.

In April 2013 the band released their second album Good Morning, Sunshine. The album was recorded at High Seas Records in Rosebank, Johannesburg. It was produced by Jacques du Plessis and Marc de la Querra from High Seas Records. Grammy Award winning producer Darryl Torr had some production input on the track called "Gimme My Fix" and Cape Town based producer Teejay Terreblanche was involved with "Bikini Weather". Singer Shane Durrant from popular South African band Desmond and the Tutus, as well as local hip hop star Zubz made guest appearances on the album. This was the first album where all tracks were written and recorded by the new five-piece line-up. This resulted in a more mature and well-rounded sound for the band.

The band was described as one of the highlights of the Cape Town 'Up the Creek' festival in February 2014. Good Morning Sunshine won best album at the 2014 MK awards, Couch Potato reached no. 4 on 5FM's top 40, Good Morning Sunshine reached no 3 5FM's top 40 and Bikini Weather no 19 5FM's top 40. The Good Morning, Sunshine music video also went to number 1 on the South African MTV Rock Chart. The band won best video at the 2014 MK Awards for their 2011 release Waterworks from their first album You're Underfed, I'm Wonderful.

Youthless was Released 5 January 2015. However on 15 February 2015, Shortstraw celebrated the official album launch at The Bassline in Johannesburg along with special guest Sawagi. Those Meddling Kids was released 1 September 2017 and was nominated for best rock album at the 24th Annual South African Music Awards.

The band has toured with a number of international artists both in South Africa and abroad, including The Kooks (UK), The Jungle Giants (AUS), Bombay Bicycle Club (UK), Last Dinosaurs (AUS), and the Dune Rats (AUS).

== Awards ==
Won

- MK Awards 2014 Best Album for Good Morning Sunshine
- MK Awards 2014 Best Video for Waterworks
- MK Award 2013 Best Indie for One Long Day
- MK MVP for Waterworks 2012

Nominated

- 2014: MTV Africa Music Awards – Best Alternative

== Members ==
Current

- Alastair Thomas – lead vocals and guitar
- Tom Revington – lead guitar
- Gad De Combes – keyboard and backing vocals
- Russell Grant – bass guitar
- Jake Rubinstein – drums

Former

- Jason Hartford – guitar and keyboard
- Phil Brierley – bass
- Oliver Nathan – drums and backing vocals

== Discography ==
- 2008 – We Slept Through it All EP
- 2011 – You're Underfed, I'm Wonderful
- 2013 – Good Morning, Sunshine
- 2015 – Youthless
- 2017 – Those Meddling Kids
- 2019 - Beacon Isle
- 2022 – Fine Thanks, And You?
