= Laurie Levine =

English weightlifter

Personal information
- Nationality: British (English)

Sport
- Sport: Weightlifting
- Event: Middleweight
- Club: Kentish Town

Lawrence Levine is a male former weightlifter who competed for England.

== Biography ==
Levine represented the England team in the -75 Kg combined category at the 1958 British Empire and Commonwealth Games in Cardiff, Wales.

Eight years later he competed for the England team, once again in the -75 Kg combined category at the 1966 British Empire and Commonwealth Games in Kingston, Jamaica.

A third Commonwealth Games appearance resulted when he represented England, at the 1970 British Commonwealth Games in Edinburgh, Scotland.

He was also the British middleweight champion.

He won middleweight gold at the 1957 Maccabiah Games. Additionally, he was a member of Maccabi London weightlifting team and won a gold medal at the 1965 Maccabiah Games.
