= Isochronous (band) =

South African rock band

ISO
- Also known as: Isochronous
- Origin: Pretoria, South Africa.
- Genres: Progressive rock, art rock, electronic rock
- Years active: 2006–present
- Members: Richard Brokensha; Darren Petersen; Franco Schoeman; Alex Parker; Kyle Petersen
- Website: www.isoband.net

ISO, formerly known as Isochronous, is a rock band from Pretoria, South Africa. The group was formed in November 2006 by members Richard Brokensha, Marko Benini, Franco Schoeman and Alex Parker.

== History ==
ISO formed in late 2006 under the name Isochronous. They released their self-titled debut album in 2008 which was distributed through Sony BMG South Africa. Their second acoustic album Imago, was released and distributed independently in 2010.

After touring Germany in 2010 as the opening act for local music icon Marius Müller-Westernhagen, this Pretoria based band confirmed their status as one of the best live acts in South Africa. While participating in a 10 show stadium tour which reported over 100,000 spectators, the group performed at some venues in Germany. In 2012, they released their Live in Germany DVD of their performance at the 02 World Arena in Berlin.

In 2011, their third album, entitled Inscape, followed. The album was recorded at Sound & Motion Studios in Cape Town and has been described as a refreshing translation of what the group succeeds to create on stage. Destiny and Torpid brought commercial success with the singles being play listed on national radio stations across SA. Torpid also peaked at nr. 8 on the 5FM Top 40 Chart. ISO was also chosen as one of the winners of the MK MVP in 2011 for a music video for Destiny. The video reached nr. 1 on the MK Top 10 Music Videos Chart for two weeks in a row. In March 2012, ISO was chosen as one of the opening acts for international band, Two Door Cinema Club, on their first tour to South Africa. With the release of their DVD in June 2012, ISO also did a nationwide tour to promote its release.

September 2012 saw the release of Piece by Piece. No Fire, the first single from the album, went on to receive extensive airplay on national and regional radio stations across South Africa and reached nr. 2 on the 5FM Top 40 Chart. Everytime followed as second single, and reached nr. 7 on the 5FM Top 40 and also nr. 1 on UCT Radio, KovsieFM and PukFM. The band released Heaven as third single in April 2013, and it also reached nr. 1 on UCT Radio and KovsieFM within the first few weeks since its release.

In July 2013, the band recorded a single with JR entitled ‘Death By Designer’ for the 5FM MashLab feature, which was subsequently play listed on 5FM. July also saw the release of their music video for Heaven, as well as an iBook entitled ‘ISO Discography’ – a first for a South African band.

ISO released a brand new single, "Never Going Back", in February 2014, the first single from their EP Passages released in March 2014. ISO recorded the EP with producer Peach van Pletzen at Sleeproom Studios in Pretoria over a period of four weeks in 2013.

Early 2015, the band announced the departure of drummer Marko Benini from the band, and soon after Nick Mc Creadie joined the band as new drummer. ISO then went into studio to record their 6th album Polydimension before taking a break from the touring circuit.

Keyboardist Alex Parker relocated to Berlin during this time. In 2021, After a long hiatus from the live circuit, Franco and Richard decided to put together an acoustic show with a more Eastern sound. They invited Ronan Skillen on percussion to join the band for these shows as well as Ronald Davies on Cello (whom recorded on the Isochronous album - Imago).

In July 2023 ISO was invited to perform at the After Dark concert series, at the Two Oceans Aquarium in Cape Town. Richard Brokensha and Franco Schoeman (2 of the founding members of ISO), produced a show which takes the audience through a journey of their 6 album catalogue. They invited Darren Petersen (Drums), Kyle Petersen (Keyboards), Ronald Davey (Cello) as well as the VOX Cape Town choir to collaborate on the production. The performance is set inside the aquarium with a magical backdrop consisting of the oceans wonderful creatures. Richard Brokensha produced a live video with videographer Kyle Wesson of the performance, and the band released the show as a live album.

== Band members ==
- Richard Brokensha - Lead vocals and guitars
- Franco Schoeman - Bass guitar and vocals
- Alex Parker - Keyboards and vocals
- Marko Benini - Drums and vocals (2006 - 2015)
- Nicholas McCreadie - Drums and vocals (2017 - 2019)
- Darren Petersen - Drums
- Kyle Petersen - Keyboards
- Ronan Skillen - Percussion
- Ronald Davies - Cello

== Discography ==
=== Albums ===
- Isochronous (LP, 2008)
- Imago (LP, 2010)
- Inscape (LP, 2011)
- Piece by Piece (LP, 2012)
- Passages (EP, 2014)
- Polydimension (LP, 2016)

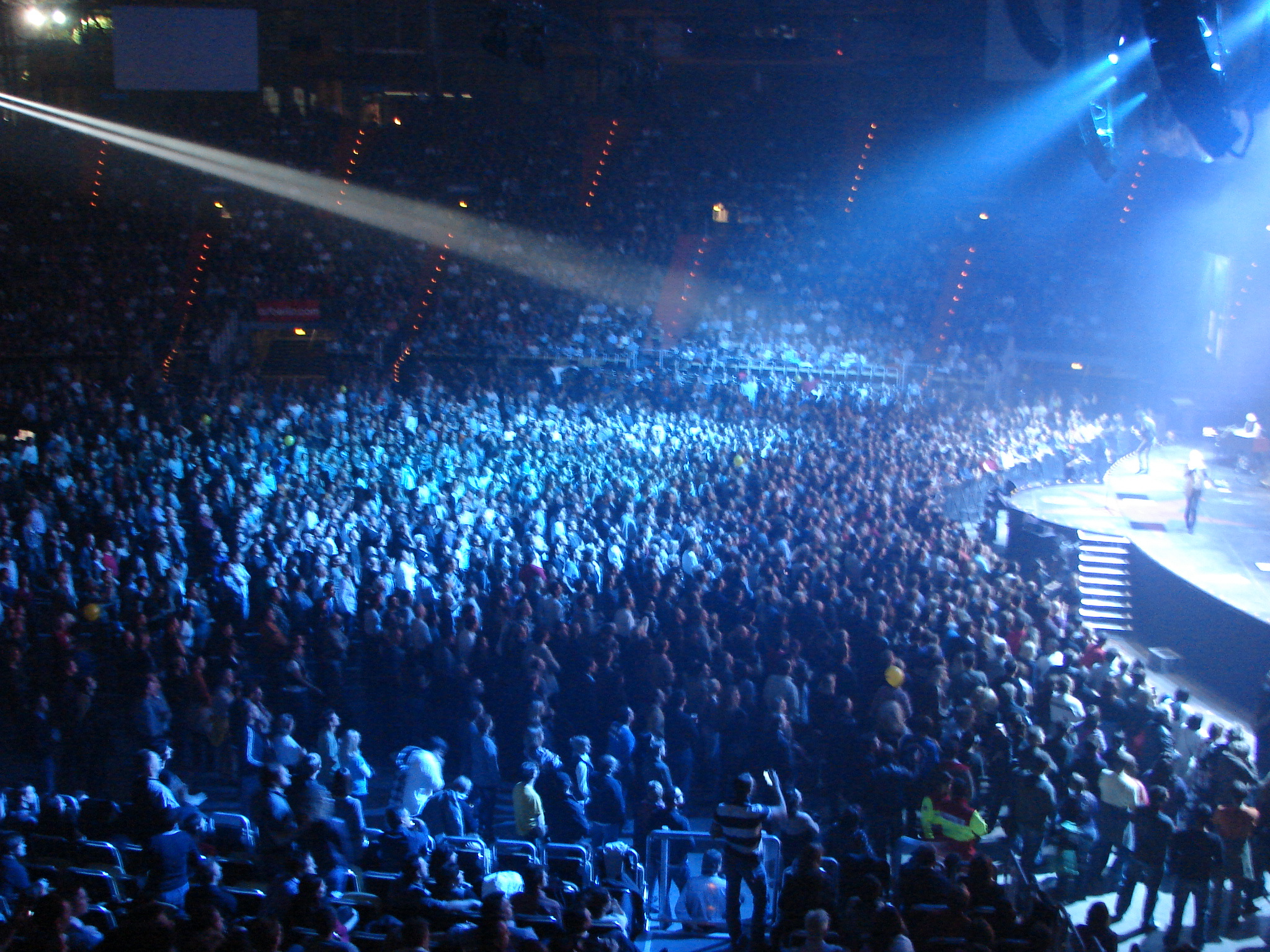
Isochronous performing at Olympiahalle, Munich. 11 October 2010.

=== Singles ===
Year	Single	Album
2008	Beauty Queen	Isochronous
2010	The Tempest	Imago
2010	The Curve	Imago
2010	Oxygen	Inscape
2011	Destiny	Inscape
2013	No Fire	Piece by Piece
2013	Everytime	Piece by Piece
2014	Heaven	Piece by Piece
2016	Rabbit Hole	Polydimension
2016	State of Blue	Polydimension

== Videography ==
=== Music videos ===
Year	Song	Director
2009	Beauty Queen	Brett De Vos
2009	The Tempest	Brett De Vos
2010	The Curve	Brett De Vos
2010	Oxygen	Fausto Becatti
2012	Destiny	Willem Grobler
2012	No Fire	Louis Minaar
2013	Heaven	Dave de Gasperi
2014	Never Going Back	Ryan Kruger
2014	Give me something to believe in	Dirk Boshoff
2016	State of Blue	Cremer van dango
2017	From the Skyline	Dizzy Khaki
