= 340ml =

Mozambican–South African band

- Origin: Maputo, Mozambique; Now based in Johannesburg, South Africa
- Genres: Experimental Tropical Pop, dub, alternative
- Years active: 2000–2012
- Labels: Sheer Sound; 340ml Music; Arame Farpado
- Members: Paulo Jorge Chibanga (Drums); Rui Soeiro (Bass); Tiago Correia-Paulo (Guitar); Pedro da Silva Pinto (Vocals and Melodica)

340ml (pronounced: three forty mil) is an African musical group who originate from Mozambique, Maputo, but were mostly based in Johannesburg, South Africa. They have therefore jokingly been described by some as being "Jozambican". The band incorporates many different elements into their music including Dub, Jazz, Ska, Afro-Jazz and Reggae. Their music has also been described by Jean Barker (a music critic on "Channel24.co.za".) as "sounding better than a cold beer opening on a hot day."

== History ==
The four band members arrived in Johannesburg in the mid-1990s in order to pursue academic careers. Paulo Chibanga had intentions on becoming an architect, Rui Soeiro studied a Bachelor of Commerce, Pedro da Silva Pinto's career choices lay in Industrial Psychology and Tiago Correia-Paulo pursued a career in Development Economics. Paulo branched out into a different area of design, with his Dubstars clothing label which was reportedly becoming very popular within Johannesburg. Rui started working on releasing music compilations called Dubvaults through the band's label 340ml Music. Pedro ventured into jewelry design and other crafts. Tiago worked as a designer and illustrator for many years and now is more involved in film scoring, video directing and musical production.

Despite all these academic qualifications, the band has always focused on producing music. Rui and Paulo joined a band which was led by their art teacher at St. Martin's School in Southern Johannesburg. That garage band was called Panic Orange. In the late 1990s Panic Orange earned a semi-final spot in the annual Emerging Sounds competition, but the then Rock band had begun to turn towards the genre of Ska and Reggae, and dropped its name, as well as its rock-playing member in the middle of the contest.

I think it became a bit of a battle... and when we hooked up with Tiago and Pedro it just worked. We were dying in the rock mode because we always wanted to do other things – different things.

— Paulo Jorge Chibanga

All four band members had known each other while growing up in Maputo. Tiago and Pedro had played together in a short lived band called 'Los Otros'.

=== Moving ===
340ml, after many false starts, derived its final name from a measurement on a beverage can when it formalised in 2000. Their debut album, Moving, was co-produced by the Jazzworx production team and incorporated parts of, amongst others, Dub, Reggae, Jazz, Brazilian music, Ska and Marrabenta

Just call it (the genre) Southern African contemporary, and it's bound to get 340ml noticed nationally, if not globally.

— Paulo Jorge Chibanga

=== Sorry for the Delay ===
Four years after releasing their debut album, Moving, 340ml released a second album entitled Sorry for the Delay. The name of their second album is a result of the many delays the band experienced while producing it, mainly due to the fact that they had been victims of Johannesburg crime four times, twice having their cars filled with equipment stolen, and twice having their studios broken into and stripped down.

=== Disbandment ===
A few years after releasing their second album, and after infinite touring, at around 2012, the band decided to quietly disband and stopped doing shows. All four band members decided to focus on other projects and spend more energy on their solo ventures.

In 2025 it was announced that the band would get back together for a few reunion shows.

== Discography ==
- I Don't Know (2001)
- Moving (2004)
- Sorry for the Delay (2008)
