= Buckfever Underground =

South African folk/punk/art band

- Genres: folk; punk
- Years active: 1997–present
- Members: Toast Coetzer; Gil Hockman; Jon Savage; Stephen Timm; Righard Kapp; Michael Currin
- Website: buckfeverunderground.bandcamp.com

The Buckfever Underground is a South African folk/punk/art band formed in 1997 by Toast Coetzer and Gil Hockman. They have English as well as Afrikaans songs. Their single "Die Volk (is in die kak)" from the 1998 debut album Jou medemens is dood was featured in the top 100 best protest songs ever in a Dutch survey. The band's third studio album, Saves, was included in lists of South Africa top ten South African albums of the decade 2000 - 2010 by both The Mail & Guardian and Die Beeld newspapers.

== Band members ==
- Toast Coetzer: vocals, lyrics
- Gil Hockman: bass / guitar
- Jon Savage: bass
- Stephen Timm: drums
- Righard Kapp: guitar
- Michael Currin: guitar

== Discography ==
- Jou Medemens Is Dood (1998)
- TAFL - Teaching Afrikaans as a Foreign Language (2003)
- Saves (2007)
- Limbs Gone Batty (2009)
- Verkeerdevlei (2012)
- The Last Days of Beautiful (2019)
