= AKING =

South African rock band

aKING
- Origin: Cape Town, South Africa
- Genre: Rock
- Years active: 2007–present
- Members: Laudo Liebenberg; Andrew Davenport; Hennie van Halen; Jaco Venter
- Past members: Hunter Kennedy

aKING is a South African melodic rock band based in Bellville, a suburb of Cape Town. The band was formed in November 2007 by Hunter Kennedy and Jaco 'Snakehead' Venter, both members of the Bellville-based Fokofpolisiekar, in collaboration with Laudo Liebenberg (vocals and guitar) and Hennie van Halen (bass).

== History ==
The band's first studio album, Dutch Courage debuted in 2008, followed by their second album, Against All Odds in early 2009. The band have toured extensively throughout South Africa, playing at major festivals such as Oppikoppi Music Festival and Coke Zero Fest in 2009, where they shared the stage with international acts Oasis, Snow Patrol and Panic! at the Disco. The band has been playlisted on major South African radio stations, including 5fm, Kfm and campus radio stations nationwide.

In 2009, aKING flew to Argentina to shoot the music video for their single, "You and I". Towards the end of 2008, the band recorded three songs for a project entitled "In The Twilight", which they did in collaboration with Cape Town-based production company Ghetto Vibrations, Khayelitsha United Mambaso and the Thokozani Brothers. aKING is associated with brother bands Fokofpolisiekar, the electronic group Die Heuwels Fantasties, and Van Coke Kartel, who often play together as part of their concept project, VanFokKingTasties. In early 2010, Andrew Davenport, a vocalist, bassist and friend of the band, replaced Hunter Kennedy on guitar. The band released their third studio album The Red Blooded Years in March 2011. The band were featured on the SABC 2 soap opera 7de Laan in early October 2015. Frontman Laudo Liebenberg featured in Shortstraw's 2017 song Eventually.

== Band members ==
=== Current members ===
- Laudo Liebenberg – vocals, rhythm guitar (2007–present)
- Hennie van Halen – bass guitar (2007–present)
- Jaco "Snakehead" Venter – drums (2007–present)
- Andrew Davenport – guitar (2010–present)

=== Former members ===
- Hunter Kennedy – guitar, vocals

== Discography ==
- Dutch Courage (LP, 2008)
- In The Twilight (EP, 2009)
- Against All Odds (LP, 2009)
- The Red Blooded Years (LP, 2011)
- The Red Blood Years: Special Edition (LP, 2012)
- Morning After (LP, 2014)
