= Chris Letcher =

- Born: Durban, South Africa
- Genres: Indie folk, baroque pop, experimental, film score
- Occupation: Singer
- Years active: 1998–present
- Labels: Sheer, Warner/Chappell
- Website: www.letchermusic.com

Chris Letcher is a South African singer-songwriter and film composer based in London and Johannesburg.

He has played with Urban Creep. Two of his albums made South Africa's Mail & Guardian "20 Best CDs of the Decade by South African Artists" list. Frieze, his 2007 album, is listed for that year in the Sunday Times Albums of the Decade. His second solo album, Spectroscope, was named 2011 album of the year.

He wrote the scores for Claire Angelique's debut feature film, My Black Little Heart, the BBC production of Women in Love, and director Ntshavheni Wa Luruli's film, Elelwani. which was shown at the Berlinale Film Festival 2013. He also composed the score for the BBC film, Challenger, which stars William Hurt. Letcher co-scored the film Black South-Easter in 2013 with Sub Pop's Spoek Mathambo.
