= Valiant Swart =

South African musician

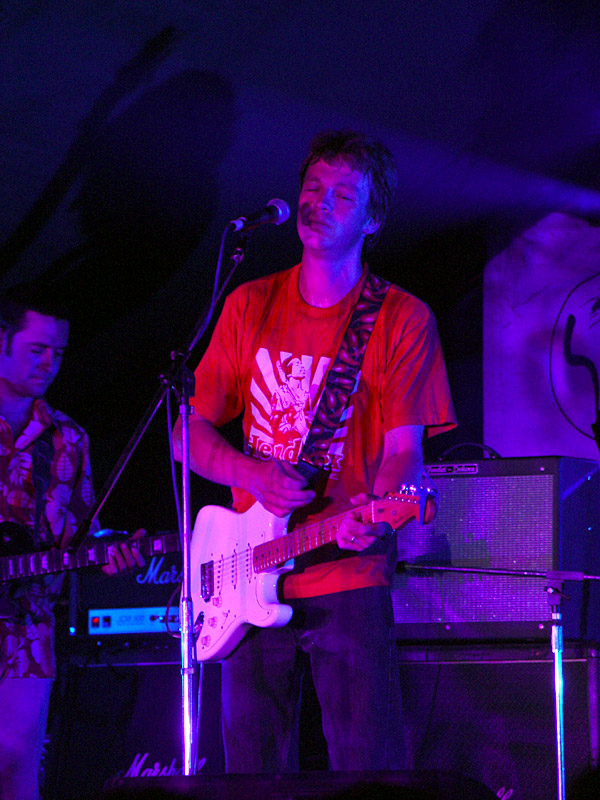
- Swart performing in 2005

Background information
- Origin: South Africa
- Genres: Alternative rock
- Years active: 1990–present
- Label: Rhythm
- Website: valiant.co.za

Valiant Swart (born Pierre Nolte, 26 November 1965), is a South African musician, Afrikaans folk rock singer-songwriter, and actor from Wellington.

== Career ==
Born in Wellington, he resided in Stellenbosch. In 1977, at 11 years old, Valiant was given a guitar by his father and taught himself to play songs from artists like George Baker and Joe Dolan. Two years later he owned his first electric guitar. He writes and sings in both English and Afrikaans. The work that was begun by artists like Anton Goosen and, later, Koos Kombuis was continued by Swart.

He has released a great number of albums debuting in 1996 with the album Die Mystic Boer. In 2014, he released a collaboration with the South African rapper Jack Parow called Tema van jou lied.

=== Song vir Katryn ===
He is most famous for his male lead role as “Jinx” in the Afrikaans romantic drama series “Song vir Katryn”, which first aired in 2003 and 2004. His character Jinx, also known as “Dr. Johan Bruwer”, is a doctor by day and musician by night. He played alongside lead actress Therese Benade, who portrayed Katryn, a mysterious woman with a complicated and dark past.

A lot of Swart’s original songs feature in the hit series, and he released an album with the same name “Song vir Katryn” in 2003. He later co-released the album “@Jinx” in 2004 with Mel Botes, who also played the character “Slab” in Song vir Katryn.

=== Sonvanger ===
His most well-known song is "Sonvanger" (meaning sun catcher) from his 2002 album Maanhare. He wrote the song after the suicide of a young Afrikaans musician from Stellenbosch. Swart wrote it with the musician's mother in mind, longing for her lost son.

He adds in an interview: "The song has since taken on a life of its own; it seems to have brought comfort to a lot of bereaved people, which, to be honest, makes me feel real good."

The song has been covered multiple times notably by Corlea Botha, Jurie Els, Laurika Rauch, Karen Zoid, Theuns Jordaan and Refentse.

== Discography ==
=== Albums ===
- Die Mystic Boer (1996)
- Dorpstraat Revisited (1996)
- Kopskoot (1997)
- Roekeloos (1998)
- Deur die Donker Vallei (1999)
- Boland Punk (2001)
- Maanhare (2002)
- Song vir Katryn (2003)
- ‘n Jaar in die son (with Koos Kombuis) (2003)
- @ Jinx (with Mel Botes) (2004)
- Mystic Myle (2005)
- Horisontaal (2006)
- Vuur en Vlam (with Ollie Viljoen) (2007)
- Vrydagaand/Saterdagaand (2008)
- Wild en Wakker (with Ollie Viljoen) (2010)
- Nagrit (2015)

=== Singles ===
- "Dis my Kruis" (1996)
- "Boomtown hotel" (1996)
- "Die skoene moet jy dra" (1996)
- "Dis 'n honde lewe" (1997)
- "Eldorado" (1997)
- "Ware liefde" (1997)
- "Eyeshadow" (1998)
- "Roekeloos" (1998)
- "Sonvanger" (2002)
- "Matrooslied" (2002)
- "Jakarandastraat" (2003)
- "Liefde in die suburbs" (2003)
- "Dans met my baby" (2003)
- "Die sewe af" (2003)
- "Lekker verby" (2003)
- "Dad se vastrap" (2003)
- "Horisontaal" (2006)
- "Vaalhoed se baas" (2006)
- "Spook en diesel" (2008)
- "Heaven Hill blues" (2008)
- "Tema van jou lied" (with Jack Parow) (2014)

== DVDs ==
- Live in die Staatsteater (2003)

== Awards ==
- Best Afrikaans Traditional Music Album (with Ollie Viljoen) - Vuur en Vlam: South African Music Awards 2008
