= Fuzigish =

South African ska punk band

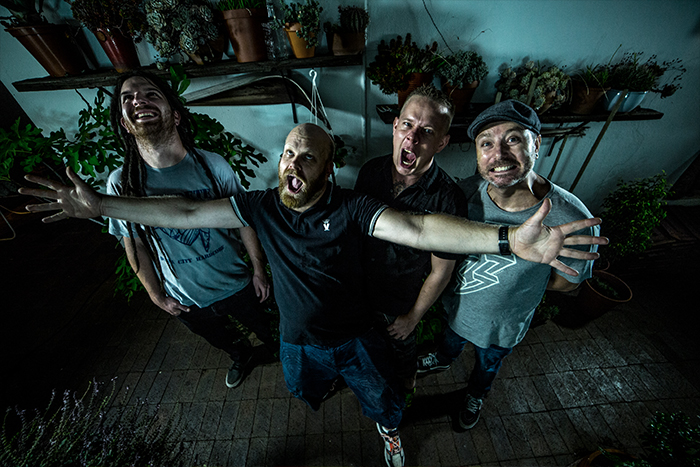

Background information
- Origin: Johannesburg, South Africa
- Genres: Ska punk
- Years active: 1997 – present
- Labels: Mongrel Records; Red Ambulance [R]evolution Records; Croakroom Records
- Members: Jay Bones (vocals, guitar); Malcolm King (Bass Guitar); William Bishop (trombone); Thomas Hughes (drums)
- Past members: Mike Martin (drums); Lee Thomson (trumpet); Jevon O'Donovan (trumpet); Ampie Omo (trombone); Ryan Tarboton (trumpet); Adriaan Van Vuuren (keyboards); Alistair Crouch (guitars); Matt Laubscher (bass); Mike Martin (drums); Leander Coetzee (drums); Robin Moir (drums)
- Website: fuzigish.org

Fuzigish (/ˈfʌziˌɡɪʃ/ FUZZ-ee-gish) is a South African ska punk band from Johannesburg, established in 1997. They are noted for their high energy performances and have released six full-length albums and one compilation since their inception. The band retain a strong DIY ethos, having released all their albums independently through their own Red Ambulance record label, as well as setting up Punk Safari, their own touring company.

== History ==
Fuzigish was officially formed in 1997 with Jay Bones (Jean-Pierre du Preez) on guitar and vocals, Capt. Rudabar (Mike Martin) on Drums, Alistair Crouch on Guitars & Matt 'Loppy' Laubscher on bass. During this period the band released the How Rude! E.P. containing the songs "Louise", "How Rude!", "Drivin'" & "No.17" amongst others. These early years culminated in headlining slot at Oppikoppi in 1998.

The band toured extensively across South Africa & Europe in 2003. After an August 2003 tour in Australia with Fat Wreck Chords band Frenzal Rhomb, 2005–2012 was Fuzigish's most stable period and saw the release of the album "Roll With The Punches" with Ampie Omo joining the line-up between from late 2006–2010 on trumpets and percussion. The album featured guest spots from Joey Cape & Fokofpolisiekar. During this period they featured in the 2007 'Footskating 101' Film Soundtrack directed by Thomas Ferreira and Brendan Jack.

In 2011 the band released the 25-track album "Setlist" which featured two new songs, and 23 songs from all four previous albums that were played at live shows, hence the title. Also in 2011, they featured in the musical/cultural documentary Punk in Africa directed by Deon Maas and Keith Jones.

Other notable international bands that Fuzigish has shared the stage with include the Violent Femmes, Q and Not U, The Selecter & New Model Army.

== Members ==
- Jay Bones - Vocals, Guitar
- Chest Rockwell - Vocals, Bass
- Big Willy - Trombone, Backing Vocals
- Tom Hughes - Drums

== Discography ==
- Skankers Union (2000)
- Southern Ska Stomper (2002)
- Exploited and Distorted (2004)
- Roll With The Punches (2007)
- Setlist (2011)
- Crazy Friends (2013)
- The Flaming Funnels of Fuzi (2020) - live album
- FUZIGISH (2022)
