= Chris Chameleon =

South African musician

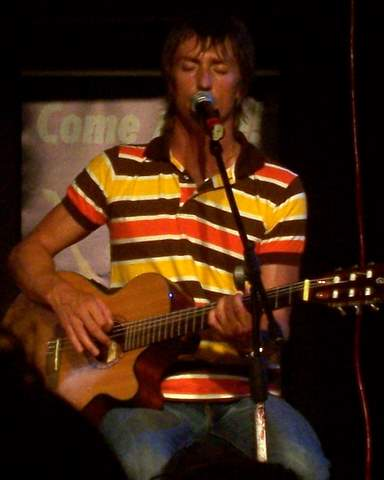
- Chris Chameleon at Mosselbay, South Africa, Dec 2006

Background information
- Born: Chris Mulder; 28 July 1971 (age 54)
- Origin: South Africa
- Genres: Folk, World, Rock, Acoustic
- Years active: 2003 – present
- Members: Chris Chameleon
- Website: www.chrischameleon.com

Chris Chameleon (born 28 July 1971) is a South African musician. He is the lead singer and bass guitarist for the band Boo!, and a solo artist. Chris has experience as an actor, making his debut in Franz Marx's Sonkring in the early 1990s, performing a role on 7de Laan as a musician, and starring in the South African soap opera, Binneland Sub Judice.

== Biography ==
Chris Chameleon was born Chris Mulder in Johannesburg on Wednesday, 28 July 1971.

Chameleon released his debut album, Ek Herhaal Jou, in 2005. It consists of the poems of Ingrid Jonker set to music. "Ek Herhaal Jou", and was nominated for a South African Music Award (SAMA) for Best Adult Contemporary Afrikaans Album in 2006. The album reached gold status in South Africa in July 2006 and platinum status in December 2007. A DVD, "Volkleur" was also released in 2005, and contained songs from "Ek Herhaal Jou" as well as hits from Boo!.

Chameleon released two albums in 2006, namely the English-language Shine, and 7de Hemel, consisting of songs sung by Chameleon's character on 7de Laan. 7de Hemel reached platinum status within two months, and Shine was nominated for a 2007 SAMA Award for Best Alternative Album.

In July 2007, he released another Afrikaans album titled Ek vir jou, which is a concept album with songs describing the different stages of a romantic relationship. His second DVD, Flight of an Extraordinary Alien, was released in October 2007, and his popular stage show, Klassieke Chameleon (Classical Chameleon), wherein he performed classical adaptations of his songs, was released as a DVD and a CD in 2008.

Kyk hoe lyk ons nou was released in March 2009, and received critical acclaim. Chameleon's album, As Jy Weer Skryf, was released on 1 June 2011, and also contains song forms of Ingrid Jonker's poems. Chameleon mentioned this in a press release on his website as something he had been wanting to do for a long time. The album contains 15 tracks, and has a more mellow and refined sound than his previous album. It is also his first album released under his own label, Chameleon Records. Herleef – Psalms en Gesange was released in October 2013.

Posduif, a collaboration between Chris Chameleon and Daniella Deysel was released in 2014. Firmament (an English album), also a collaboration with Daniella Deysel, was released in 2016. His studio album Jy en Ek en Ek en Jy, the third collaboration with Daniella Deysel, was released in 2017. At the 25th ceremony of South African Music Awards it was nominated for Beste Kontemporêre Musiekalbum.

== Discography ==
- Ek Herhaal Jou (2005)
- Shine (2006)
- 7de Hemel (2006)
- Ek vir jou (2007)
- Flight of an Extraordinary Alien (2007)
- Klassieke Chameleon (2008)
- Kyk hoe lyk ons nou (2009)
- As Jy Weer Skryf (2011)
- Herleef (2013)
- Posduif (2014)
- Firmament (2016)
- Jy en Ek en Ek en Jy (2017)

== See also ==
- List of South African musicians
