= The Blues Broers =

South African blues rock band

The Blues Broers is a blues rock band from South Africa formed in 1990.

== Discography ==
- Shake Like That (1991)
- Damn Fine Mojo (1994)
- Sharp Street (1995)
- Been Around (1996)
- Cellar Tapes (1998)
- Out Of The Blue (2011)
- Jungle Bells - Single (2013)
- Into The Red (2014)

== History ==
The Blues Broers' was formed by members of three other bands, the Flaming Firestones, All Night Radio and Black Frost, in early 1990, with the horn players joining in 1996 for their 4th album Been Around. They had gained attraction with their heavy gig-playing schedule, but did not impress any South African record labels. They recorded their first album Shake Like That with their own label, Guava Records.

Their 3rd album, Sharp Street was released in 1995 to general acclaim; the album had a range of different musical styles and themes, including ragtime and Chicago blues. At this point, the band had been getting worldwide attention, including a page from the Los Angeles Times, whose reporter said that they were a very visual group. In 1996, Been Around boosted their popularity. The album had 14 cuts, removing a tribute to Stevie Ray Vaughan. This album with their usual gigging had boosted their ticket sales, along with numerous festival appearances.
