= Jack Parow =

South African rapper (born 1982)

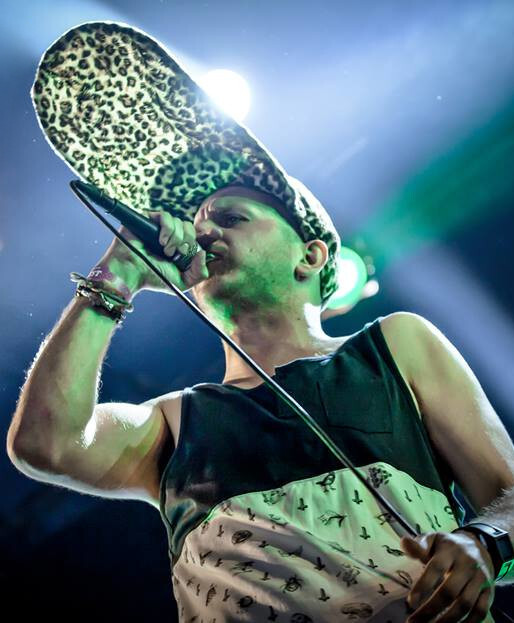
- Parow in 2015

Background information
- Born: Zander Tyler; 22 February 1982 (age 44); Durbanville, Western Cape, South Africa
- Genres: Hip hop; electronic dance
- Occupations: Rapper; singer
- Instrument: Vocals
- Website: jackparow.co.za

Zander Tyler (born 22 February 1982), better known under his stage name Jack Parow, is a South African rapper who has collaborated with other South African artists such as Die Heuwels Fantasties, Die Antwoord, and Francois Van Coke.

== Career ==
Parow wanted to be a rapper since he was in primary school. He used to rap with friend Keagan Cloete aka cutie cloete, citing Snoop Dogg's Doggystyle as an initial inspiration as well as the likes of T-Pain. Although he started rapping in English, he soon decided that he preferred Afrikaans.

His first hit came with the single Cooler as Ekke and jeffalingaling, which was promoted by friends in Die Heuwels Fantasties. He collaborated with them on their song Die Vraagstuk. He has since released four studio albums and toured around the world.

In 2015, Parow released a biography, Die Ou Met die Snor by die Bar, authored by local artist Theunis Engelbrecht.

In 2016, Parow and his friend Hardus van Deventer shot a nine episode TV series titled Dis Hoe Ons Rol, which aired from July to August 2016 on the Kyknet premium TV channel. Filming took place as two legs over 30 days, during which Parow performed in each of South Africa's nine provinces at least once.

In January 2017, Parow launched his own brandy product known as Parow Brandy.

He is currently managed by Fokofpolisiekar and Van Coke Kartel member, Wynand Myburgh.

== Personal life ==
Parow has a daughter, Ruby Tyler, born in 2012. Ruby was the inspiration for Parow's 2014 song "Dis Befok", and video footage for the 2016 remix of the song was shot by her via a chest-mounted camera.

== Discography ==
Jack Parow's first release was the Cooler as ekke EP in December 2009. It was released as a limited edition of 600 ice-creamcone-shaped USB flash drives and featured 10 songs and six music videos.

Studio albums

List of studio Albums
| Title | Album details |
|---|---|
| Jack Parow | Released: 2010; Format: digital download, CD |
| Eksie Ou | Released: 2011; Format: digital download, CD |
| Nag Van Die Lang Pette | Released: 2014; Format: digital download, CD |
| Dis Hoe Ons Rol | Released: 2016; Format: digital download, CD |
| Afrika 4 Beginners | Released: 2017; Format: digital download, CD |
| Die Evangelie van Goeie Tye | Released: 2023; Format: digital download |

EPs

List of studio EPs
| Title | EPs details |
|---|---|
| Cooler as Ekke | Released: 2009; Format: digital download, CD |
| From Parow with Love | Released: 2016; Format: digital download, CD |
