= Chasm (The Awakening album) =

2018 studio album by The Awakening

Studio album by The Awakening
- Released: 26 November 2018
- Studios: Intervention Studios, United States
- Genres: Gothic rock; Darkwave
- Length: 41:52
- Label: Intervention Arts
- Producer: Ashton Nyte

The Awakening chronology
Tales of Absolution and Obsoletion (2009)	Chasm (2018)	This Alchemy (2021)

Singles from Chasm
- 1. "Shore" Released: September 2018; 2. "Back to Wonderland" Released: 20 November 2018; 3. "About You" Released: July 2019

Chasm is the ninth studio album by the South African gothic rock band The Awakening, released on 26 November 2018 through Intervention Arts. Arriving nine years after Tales of Absolution and Obsoletion (2009), it was the band's first album of new songs since that record, and its first new music of any kind since "Fault", a new track on the 2013 compilation Anthology XV.

Ashton Nyte wrote, produced and mixed the album, and played everything on it apart from the drums. Its songs move between romantic darkwave ballads and driving gothic rock, with lyrics about loss, isolation and the state of the world. It was well received in the gothic and alternative music press: Torched Magazine found it "solid throughout" and declared the band "back with a vengeance", and Terra Relicta rated it 8.5 out of 10.

== Background ==
In the years after Tales of Absolution and Obsoletion, Nyte's work went largely into solo albums and collaborations, among them MGT, his duo with Mark Gemini Thwaite, and Michael Ciravolo's collective Beauty in Chaos. The Awakening released the compilation Anthology XV in 2013 and toured Europe in support of The Mission in 2016. Nyte said he wrote Chasm before he began working with Ciravolo, wanting to give both projects "the space and energy they deserved".

He wrote the opening track, "Other Ghosts", very quickly, as "a stream of consciousness of sorts", and intended it as the title track of a solo album. "At the eleventh hour" he decided that it should open Chasm instead, although he considered it "quite a departure in style for The Awakening".

== Recording ==
Nyte wrote all of the album's music and lyrics and recorded it at Intervention Studios in the United States, playing every instrument except the drums, which were played by the band's longtime drummer Sevven. He also produced and mixed the album and designed its packaging. The band paid for the release itself, funding it through a pre-order campaign that offered signed copies, handwritten lyrics and merchandise.

== Music and lyrics ==
Chasm ranges from romantic darkwave ballads to up-tempo gothic rock and heavier, more atmospheric pieces. Terra Relicta found it "deeper, more romantic, more elaborated" than anything the band had made before, and described The Awakening as "a link between The Sisters Of Mercy, HIM, Type O Negative and The Mission"; the German magazine Amboss also heard a strong Mission influence, and a "düstere Harmonie" (dark harmony) running through the album from its first notes. Both reviews identified loss, isolation and the state of the world as its lyrical concerns, and Amboss added grief.

The chorus of "Other Ghosts" builds, in Torched's words, into "a cinematic crescendo that should have Jim Steinman envious". Nyte called "About You" "one of the most personal songs on the album", its lyrics written "many years ago, after losing somebody very close to me". "Back to Wonderland", he said, is "a song about how we prefer to entertain or distract ourselves rather than actually dealing with the awful things going on in the world"; while he understood the need to escape, he felt that "we have become increasingly desensitized to the daily atrocities, injustices and inequities", and that "it is indeed time to swim against the flow". Elsewhere, "Gave Up the Ghost" is a 12-string acoustic ballad, and "A Minor Incision" builds a slow, menacing atmosphere before turning into what Terra Relicta called "a goth/punkish upbeat brawl".

== Release ==
The Awakening announced Chasm in September 2018, releasing "Shore" as its first single and opening the pre-order campaign. "It feels magical to be putting out a new Awakening album again," Nyte said. A lyric video for "Back to Wonderland" followed in November, and the album was released on 26 November on vinyl, CD and digital download.

The music videos were slower to arrive. Soon after the release, Nyte said, he "needed to put my energies elsewhere": he worked on a film score with the composer Ethan Gold, continued with Beauty in Chaos, and dealt with "a few life and health issues". The first video, for "About You", appeared in July 2019; Nyte directed and edited it, and Rose Mortem designed the clothing and appears in it. A video for "Back to Wonderland", drawing on excerpts from Fritz Lang's Metropolis, followed in August. Ahead of his autumn 2019 European tour supporting Wayne Hussey, Nyte said his solo sets would draw mainly on Awakening songs, "with a healthy dose off the new album".

== Critical reception ==
Professional ratings
Review scores
Source	Rating
Terra Relicta	8.5/10
Amboss	Gut+

Michael Mitchell of Torched Magazine found the album "solid throughout and full of memorable dark melodies and brooding lyrics", picked out the catchy hooks of "About You" and "Hear Me", and concluded that the band were "back with a vengeance". Terra Relicta credited its "good songwriting, solid performance and perfect production" and gave it 8.5 out of 10, while noting that it "doesn't offer anything especially new". Amboss rated it "gut+" (good plus), writing that the band struck a balance between quiet balladry and forceful dark rock, and called the closing "Shadows in the Dark" "ein mehr als würdiger Abschluss" (more than a worthy conclusion); in mood, the reviewer added, it was more of an autumn album.

== Track listing ==
No.	Title	Writer(s)	Length
1.	"Other Ghosts"	Ashton Nyte	4:24
2.	"Shore"	Nyte	4:41
3.	"About You"	Nyte	4:03
4.	"Raphael Awake"	Nyte	4:01
5.	"Back to Wonderland"	Nyte	4:33
6.	"Gave Up the Ghost"	Nyte	3:09
7.	"Savage Freedom"	Nyte	4:09
8.	"A Minor Incision"	Nyte	4:46
9.	"Hear Me"	Nyte	4:13
10.	"Shadows in the Dark"	Nyte	3:53
Total length:			41:52

== Personnel ==
- Ashton Nyte – vocals, all instruments except drums, production, mixing, package design
- Sevven – drums
- Rose Mortem – clothing design, cover model
- Todd Davis – cover photography
