= Anthology XV =

2013 compilation album by The Awakening

Compilation album by The Awakening
- Released: 27 April 2013 (digital); April 2014 (CD)
- Recorded: 1997–2013
- Genres: Gothic rock; Darkwave
- Label: Intervention Arts
- Producer: Ashton Nyte

The Awakening chronology
Tales of Absolution and Obsoletion (2009)	Anthology XV (2013)	Chasm (2018)

Singles from Anthology XV
- 1. "Fault" Released: 1 August 2013

Anthology XV is a compilation album by the South African gothic rock band The Awakening, released as a download on 27 April 2013 through Intervention Arts, and on CD in 2014. Marking fifteen years of the band's music, it gathers songs from across its catalogue, every one of them remixed, reworked or re-recorded, together with two new songs, "Fault" and "Beneath Your Feet". They were the band's last new songs until Chasm (2018), nine years after its previous studio album, Tales of Absolution and Obsoletion (2009).

== Background and content ==
Anthology XV revisits songs spanning The Awakening's first fifteen years, from its cover of Simon & Garfunkel's "The Sound of Silence", first released on the debut album Risen (1997), to "Upon the Water" from Tales of Absolution and Obsoletion. Along the way it returns to "The Dark Romantics" from The Fourth Seal of Zeen (2000), "My World" from Roadside Heretics (2002), "Angelyn" from Darker Than Silence (2004) and "Razors Burn" from Razor Burn (2006). Rather than reissuing the original recordings, Ashton Nyte, who produced the compilation, remixed, reworked or re-recorded every track and remastered the collection, labelling the new versions with tags such as "(XV)" and "(2014)". Terra Relicta described the result as having an "even more polished, deep and heavy sound" than the originals.

== Release ==
Anthology XV was first released as a 21-track download on 27 April 2013. A video for "Fault" followed on 1 August 2013. In April 2014 Intervention Arts issued the compilation on CD in a gatefold digipak, with 18 tracks; three songs, "Nothing Like the Rain", "Rain" and "Before I Leap", remained exclusive to the digital edition.

== Critical reception ==
Terra Relicta called Anthology XV "a monument of high quality and supreme gothic music" and "one of the best compilations from a band released in last years", praising its "special blend of all things goth music can offer" and recommending it to fans of Type O Negative, Diary of Dreams, HIM and The 69 Eyes. Its only reservation was that the compilation was available only as a download, and that it deserved a physical release; the CD edition followed the next year.

== Track listing ==
CD edition (2014)
No.	Title	Writer(s)	Length
1.	"The Sound of Silence" (2014)	Paul Simon	3:53
2.	"Descent" (Chrome Mix)	Ashton Nyte	4:18
3.	"Indian Summer Rain" (XV)	Nyte	4:32
4.	"Angelyn" (2014)	Nyte	4:48
5.	"Fault"	Nyte	3:45
6.	"Beneath Your Feet"	Nyte	5:08
7.	"Razors Burn" (XV)	Nyte	4:43
8.	"Upon the Water" (XV)	Nyte	4:26
9.	"Mirror Tricks" (XV)	Nyte	4:06
10.	"My World" (Apocalyptic Version)	Nyte	4:06
11.	"Eve" (Wish Version XV)	Nyte	4:33
12.	"The Dark Romantics" (XV)	Nyte	4:45
13.	"Maree" (XV)	Nyte	4:13
14.	"The March" (Single Mix XV)	Nyte	3:54
15.	"Vampyre Girl" (2014)	Nyte	4:12
16.	"Standing" (Axial Version)	Nyte	4:11
17.	"Martyr" (2014)	Nyte	4:56
18.	"Amethyst" (Live Piano Version XV)	Nyte

Digital edition bonus tracks
No.	Title	Writer(s)	Length
19.	"Nothing Like the Rain" (XV)	Nyte	4:09
20.	"Rain" (XV)	Nyte	4:15
21.	"Before I Leap" (XV)	Nyte	4:26
