= Roadside Heretics =

2002 studio album by The Awakening

Studio album by The Awakening
- Released: October 2002
- Recorded: June–September 2002
- Studios: Intervention Studios, Johannesburg
- Genres: Gothic rock; Industrial rock
- Length: 51:56
- Label: Intervention Arts
- Producer: Ashton Nyte

The Awakening chronology
The Fourth Seal of Zeen (2000)	Roadside Heretics (2002)	Darker Than Silence (2004)

Singles from Roadside Heretics
- 1. "The Maker"

Roadside Heretics is the fifth studio album by the South African gothic rock band The Awakening, released in South Africa in October 2002 through Intervention Arts. Ashton Nyte wrote, recorded, produced and played the album himself, and later described it as his "first experimentation with a harder sound". It reached number two on the SA Rock Digest South African album chart, its song "The Maker" spent two weeks at number one on the publication's weekly MP3 chart, and the Digest ranked it 22nd among the South African albums of 2002.

== Background and recording ==
Roadside Heretics followed The Fourth Seal of Zeen (2000) and the EP The Fountain (2001). Nyte recorded, mixed and produced it at Intervention Studios in Johannesburg between June and September 2002, writing all of the songs and playing all of the instruments.

In April 2002, while the album was still tentatively titled Beyond the Realm, Nyte said the songs being chosen were "decidedly more guitar-driven and aggressive than anything we've released before", and that he wanted "to capture the energy of the live band". The band's live line-up then included a second guitarist.

Looking back in 2009, Nyte saw the album as a dividing line in the band's history: "I think with 'Roadside Heretics' there was a very definite break in 'The Awakening' pre-'Roadside Heretics' and post-'Roadside Heretics'". He called it his "first experimentation with a harder sound and more, kind of, direct form of songwriting", an approach he varied on Darker Than Silence (2004) and pushed furthest on Razor Burn (2006).

== Release and promotion ==
Intervention Arts released Roadside Heretics in South Africa only, in October 2002. The band played Burn in Durban on 25 October with DJ Matthew Fink. On 29 November the band played at midnight at the 2002 edition of The Shadow Theatre, its club night of music, art, theatre and fashion, at Zeplins in Pretoria, and on 13 December it launched the album in Cape Town at a Shadow Theatre at the Purple Turtle, with Aftertaste.

The song "Vampyre Girl" was recorded during the period but left off the album; it appeared on the band's 2003 compilation Sacrificial Etchings.

== Chart performance ==
Roadside Heretics entered the SA Rock Digest Top 30 South African Albums chart on 11 November 2002. It climbed to number 4 on 25 November and reached its peak of number two on 9 December, spending 11 weeks on the chart.

"The Maker" entered the Digest's weekly chart of South African MP3 downloads at number 27 in November 2002, rose to number 7 the following week, and spent two weeks at number one in late November and early December.

== Critical reception ==
Introducing "The Maker" in the SA Rock Digest, the publication called it "more rock than goth", a "pounding track" that "would have fitted perfectly on the 'Triple X' soundtrack. Rammstein, anyone?" In its review of the year, the Digest placed Roadside Heretics 22nd among the South African albums of 2002. Its writers heard Bowie, Lou Reed and Iggy Pop "jostling for pole position with Goth gods Sisters of Mercy, Bauhaus and The Mission", mixed with "the nu-metal feel of Rammstein and Linkin Park", and concluded: "This album will melt your heart and your speakers."

Doug Van Pelt of HM wrote that Nyte "has a great understanding of the gothic aesthetic", and that alongside "modern day mainstream breakthru's like Reznor and Manson, The Awakening would surely make Bowie, Murphy, and Reed proud". He found the album "pendulum-swinging back more towards a Christcentric foundation lyrically", while noting that Nyte "can still make us squirm with a sensuous love song like 'Cover'". He summed it up in one word: "Brilliant."

== Track listing ==
All tracks are written by Ashton Nyte.

No.	Title	Length
1.	"Roadside Heretics"	4:32
2.	"Mirror Tricks"	4:05
3.	"The Maker"	4:04
4.	"Beautiful"	4:16
5.	"My World"	4:06
6.	"Fallen"	3:44
7.	"Angels"	4:40
8.	"Away from Home"	3:17
9.	"The No-Where Mind"	4:44
10.	"Tracey-Junkie"	5:27
11.	"Complexion"	3:43
12.	"Cover"	5:18
Total length:		51:56

== Personnel ==
- Ashton Nyte – vocals, all instruments, recording, mixing, production
- Michelle S. Theron – make-up
- L'Oreal van der Spuy, Peter Heyneke, Steven Brewis, Tasja Wohler – photography and package design
