= Matthew Fink =

Matthew Fink is a South-African record producer, sound engineer, and musician. Throughout his career, he has produced and recorded a wide range of South African Artists across many genres. In the early 2000's he broke through as a sought-after indie-producer, especially after producing Jim Neversink's eponymous debut album in 2005.

Many of the albums he has produced have received critical acclaim, with one journalist pronouncing him "the best rock producer in the country." In 2014, Fink was nominated twice for a South African Music Award in the category Best Engineer of the Year; the two albums in question were: The Home We Built by Matthew Mole and Goodbye Wild Child by Shadowclub.

== As a musician ==
Fink masters several instruments – keyboard, synthesizer, organ, accordion and guitar. He has been a member of Jim Neversink and The Black Hotels; he has performed live with both outfits and appears on their recordings.

In the early 2000s Fink worked with Ashton Nyte. In 2002 Nyte named him as the keyboard player in The Awakening's live band. Fink played grand piano on the live piano version of "Amethyst" on the band's 2001 EP The Fountain, appeared as a DJ on the bill with the band in 2002, and has since been described as a former member of The Awakening. He was also a member of Nyte's band Ashton Nyte and the Accused, playing guitar on its 2005 album Headspace and writing the music for its song "Violent Complex".

== Discography ==
Fink has produced the following artists (incomplete list)

- 2005: Jim Neversink – Jim Neversink (Ent Entertainment); with Fink on accordion and guitar
- 2006: Unspoken – Laurie Levine (Independent)
- 2007: Beautiful Mornings (EP) – The Black Hotels
- 2008: Shakey Is Good'– Jim Neversink (Radio Lava)
- 2009: Films for the next century – The Black Hotels (independent release); with Fink on keyboards
- 2011: Honey Badger – The Black Hotels (Sovereign Entertainment); with Fink on Keyboards
- 2011: Tale of the Son – Tale of the Son (Deconstruction Recordings 2011)
- 2011: Guns and Money – Shadowclub (Just Music)
- 2012: Songs from the Edge of the World – The One Night Stands (Sting Music)
- 2012: The Dark Horse – Tailor (Just Music)
- 2013 Abraham (EP) – Nakhane Touré (Just Music)
- 2013 The Home We Built – Matthew Mole (Just Music)
- 2013 Brave Confusion – Nakhane Toure (Just Music)
- 2014 Trouble – The Anti Retro Vinyls (Just Music)
- 2015 Serpente Masjien – Sannie Fox (Just Music)
- 2015 We're Still Running – Van T (Just Music)
- 2016 "Let Me In" (Single) – Ramdaz (Just Music) – Co-Producer
- 2017 "Butterflies" (Single) – Bianca Blanc (Just Music)
- 2017 "Lost" (Single) – Ramdaz (Just Music) – Co-Producer
- 2018 My Soul Got Stranger – Sannie Fox (Just Music)
- 2018 Bianca Blanc – Bianca Blanc (Just Music)
- 2019 "Come With Me" (Single) – Ramdaz (Just Music) – Co-Producer
- 2019 Deezer Sessions – Bianca Blanc
- 2020 Filth and Wisdom – The Medicine Dolls (Just Music)
- 2023 No Wah-Wah – Jim Neversink (Present Records / The Good Times)
- 2024 I'm with the Singer – Martin Schofield. Received a SAMA Award in the category "Best alternative album"

https://beatlab.co.za/getting-to-know-matthew-fink/
