= Sinister Swing =

2003 studio album by Ashton Nyte

Studio album by Ashton Nyte
- Released: 2003
- Genres: Electronic; Experimental
- Label: Intervention Arts
- Producer: Ashton Nyte

Ashton Nyte chronology
Dirt Sense (2002)	Sinister Swing (2003)	Headspace (2005)

Singles from Sinister Swing
- 1. "Fingertips"; 2. "Little Everything"; 3. "Distance"

Sinister Swing is the third solo studio album by the South African musician Ashton Nyte, frontman of the gothic rock band The Awakening, released in 2003 through Intervention Arts. Nyte's website describes it as "an Avant-Garde Pop-Art Semi-Dystopian love affair, once described as 'organic electronic'". "Fingertips", "Little Everything" and "Distance" were released as singles. Nyte later adapted the album into a cabaret, Subtle Deviant, staged at the University of Pretoria.

== Stage adaptation ==
Nyte later wrote and starred in a cabaret adaptation of Sinister Swing, staged with the University of Pretoria's theatre department. Titled Subtle Deviant, it was performed at the university's Masker Theatre in 2003.

== Remastered edition ==
In 2013 Nyte released a remastered edition of Sinister Swing, with new mixes of five of its songs: "Fingertips", "Distance", "The Cutting Room", "Rogue" and "Fading".

== Track listing ==
All songs written by Ashton Nyte. Track lengths are from the 2013 remastered edition.

No.	Title	Length
1.	"Revival"	3:33
2.	"Passing Phase"	3:53
3.	"Little Everything"	4:08
4.	"White White Noise"	4:59
5.	"Fingertips"	3:28
6.	"Distance"	5:02
7.	"Trivial Things"	3:41
8.	"The Cutting Room"	3:48
9.	"Real"	4:01
10.	"Borrow the Hatchet"	2:14
11.	"Rogue"	4:18
12.	"Fading"	4:51
Total length:		47:56
