= Finding Beauty in Chaos =

2018 album by Beauty in Chaos

Studio album by Beauty in Chaos
- Released: September 28, 2018
- Recorded: Los Angeles, California
- Studio: SAINTinLA Studio
- Genre: Majority: • Alternative rock • Industrial rock • Gothic rock • Alternative metal Minority: • Rock • Hard rock • Heavy metal • Hardcore punk
- Length: 79:00
- Label: 33.3 Music Collective (via Bandcamp)
- Producer: Micheal Rozon

Finding Beauty in Chaos is the debut album by alternative rock supergroup Beauty in Chaos. The album was released on September 28, 2018. The project was created by Michael Ciravolo of Human Drama and Gene Loves Jezebel, who writes on every track excluding cover track 4. Most of the album is composed of industrial and gothic bands, with various other genres also being featured on the album. Most of the album was recorded and mixed in Ciravolo's own SAINTinLA Studio which is based in Sun Valley, Los Angeles by producer Michael Rozon.

The release features various notable musicians, including Al Jourgensen (Ministry), Simon Gallup (The Cure), Ashton Nyte (The Awakening), Michael Aston (Gene Loves Jezebel), Robin Zander (Cheap Trick), Michael Anthony (Van Halen), Ice T (Body Count), dUg Pinnick (King's X), and Wayne Hussey (The Mission).

A follow-up remix album titled Beauty Re-envisioned will be released in March 2019.

== Reception ==
Professional ratings
Review scores
Source	Rating
The Spill Magazine	4.5/5.0 stars

Aaron Badgley of The Spill Magazine gave the album a very positive rating of 4.5/5. Badgley elaborates further on the album below.

Ciravolo has come up with a brilliant album, collaborating with a diverse list of artists. He lets the guests do what they do well and incorporates all of their talent into it to create a cohesive album. Beauty In Chaos is a dark, moody masterpiece for our dark moody times.

— Aaron Badgley of The Spill Magazine

== Track listing ==
1. Road to Rosario - 4:36 (Aston / Ciravolo)
2. Storm - 6:12 (Nyte / Ciravolo)
3. Man of Faith - 4:33 (Hussey / Ciravolor)
4. 20th Century Boy - 4:35 (Performed by Al Jourgensen/ Written by Marc Bolan)
5. Drifting Away - 4:49 (Zander, Ciravolo, Christian, Matchinga)
6. Memory of Love - 4:18 (Indovina / Ciravolo)
7. Look Up - 5:28 (Ciravolo)
8. Un-Natural Disaster - 5:29 (Pinnick / Ice-T / Ciravolo)
9. The Long Goodbye - 5:03 (Hussey / Ciravolo)
10. Beauty Lies Within - 6:36 (Indovina / Ciravolo)
11. Bloodless and Fragile - 8:10 (Nyte / Ciravolo)
12. I Will Follow You - 6:59 (Vine / Ciravolo)
13. Heliotrope - 5:16 (Martin / Ciravolo)
14. Finding Beauty in Chaos - 7:14 (Nyte / Ciravolo)
