= Headspace (Ashton Nyte album) =

2005 studio album by Ashton Nyte and the Accused

Studio album by Ashton Nyte and the Accused
- Released: 2005
- Recorded: March–June 2005
- Studios: Intervention Studios; Pyramid Rox Studios
- Genre: Alternative rock
- Length: 43:12
- Label: Intervention Arts
- Producer: Ashton Nyte

Ashton Nyte and the Accused chronology
| Sinister Swing (2003) | Headspace (2005) | The Valley (2009) |

Singles from Headspace
- 1. "My Little Rock 'n Roll"; 2. "Murder Me"; 3. "Sweet Nothing"

Headspace is the fourth solo studio album by the South African musician Ashton Nyte, frontman of the gothic rock band The Awakening. It was released in 2005 through Intervention Arts under the name Ashton Nyte and the Accused, the five-piece band that also included Frankie Clark, Katherine Hunt, Matthew Fink and Warrick Poultney. Nyte's website describes it as "an ode to life, love, and rock 'n roll", a "rather rugged lo-fi gem" that moves "between the spirit of New York City and the Nevada desert through the lens of Johannesburg, South Africa".

== Recording ==
Headspace was recorded with Nyte's full live band. It was recorded, mixed and produced by Nyte at Intervention Studios between March and June 2005, with the drums recorded by Garrick van der Tuin at Pyramid Rox Studios.

Nyte wrote the songs and sang, played lead and rhythm guitar and added bass, organ and piano on several tracks. Fink played rhythm, wah and ambient guitar and wrote the music for "Violent Complex"; Clark played bass and sang backing vocals; Poultney played drums; and Hunt played violin on seven tracks. "Like Jimmy Dean" is a solo performance by Nyte on vocals and acoustic guitars.

== Release ==
Headspace was released in South Africa by Intervention Arts in 2005, distributed by Alter Ego. "My Little Rock 'n Roll", "Murder Me" and "Sweet Nothing" were released as singles, and a music video was made for "Murder Me".

== Track listing ==
| No. | Title | Writer(s) | Length |
|---|---|---|---|
| 1. | "Unpredictable" | Ashton Nyte | 3:08 |
| 2. | "My Little Rock 'n Roll" | Nyte | 3:34 |
| 3. | "Murder Me" | Nyte | 4:06 |
| 4. | "Free" | Nyte | 3:25 |
| 5. | "City" | Nyte | 3:49 |
| 6. | "Like Jimmy Dean" | Nyte | 4:03 |
| 7. | "Play the Part" | Nyte | 4:05 |
| 8. | "Violent Complex" | Nyte, Matthew Fink | 4:37 |
| 9. | "Solitude" | Nyte | 4:21 |
| 10. | "Sweet Nothing" | Nyte | 4:00 |
| 11. | "Headspace" | Nyte | 4:04 |
| Total length: | | | 43:12 |

== Personnel ==
Ashton Nyte and the Accused

- Ashton Nyte – vocals, lead and rhythm guitar, acoustic and slide guitar, bass, organ, piano, tambourine; recording, mixing, production
- Frankie Clark – bass, backing vocals
- Katherine Hunt – violin
- Matthew Fink – rhythm, wah and ambient guitar, feedback
- Warrick Poultney – drums

Additional personnel

- Garrick van der Tuin – drum recording
- Robyn Davie – cover model
