= Autumn's Children =

2023 studio album by Ashton Nyte

Studio album by Ashton Nyte
- Released: 25 August 2023
- Genres: Folk; Acoustic
- Length: 33:17
- Label: Intervention Arts
- Producer: Ashton Nyte

Ashton Nyte chronology
| Waiting for a Voice (2020) | Autumn's Children (2023) |

Singles from Autumn's Children
- 1. "Something Beautiful" Released: 30 May 2023; 2. "Cinnamon" Released: 3 July 2023; 3. "Horses" Released: 2 August 2023; 4. "The Garden" Released: 25 August 2023

Autumn's Children is the ninth solo studio album by South African singer-songwriter Ashton Nyte, released on 25 August 2023 through Intervention Arts together with a companion book of the same name. An intimate, largely acoustic record of ten original songs and a cover of "Secret Love", it followed his 2020 album Waiting for a Voice. Nyte said it had "a fragile vulnerability to it which I've never fully revealed before", and called it "a terrifying and exhilarating new chapter for me".

The album was well received. Reviewing it for Louder Than War, Julianne Regan called it "an album of veil'd Melancholy, with a capital 'M'", and American Songwriter included it in its list of the best albums of 2023.

== Background and recording ==
Autumn's Children followed Waiting for a Voice, which had also been released with a book of Nyte's writing. American Songwriter described the new album as a set of self-confessions and contemplations, the work of an artist who had turned inward in the three years since. Nyte wrote, performed, produced and mixed it himself.

== Music and lyrics ==
The album has eleven tracks and runs just over half an hour. Regan singled out its restraint, with acoustic guitar, piano, soft electronics and orchestral percussion arranged around Nyte's voice, which she described as "absolutely centre stage". She heard it as a concept album and compared it to Nick Drake, Richard Hawley and Brett Anderson, describing "Into the Dream" as an "aural film noir" and "Rivers Run Black" as dark art-folk. Jammerzine called it Nyte's most intimate and personal work to date.

Nyte described the first three singles as dealing with inadequacy, hope in the face of adversity, and the courage to let go. "Something Beautiful" explores a relationship from the perspective of someone who feels undeserving of love but is grateful for it, and Post-Punk.com heard influences from Nick Cave, Jeff Buckley and Beck in it. Nyte called "Cinnamon" "an ode to hope in the face of adversity", written while "navigating various shades of depression and self-doubt", and "a song about coping". He described "The Garden" as "a celebration of nature and life in its most organic and fundamental form".

The album includes a cover of "Secret Love", written by Sammy Fain and Paul Francis Webster for the 1953 film Calamity Jane and made famous by Doris Day. Regan wrote that Nyte had "made it his own".

== Release ==
"Something Beautiful" was released as the first single on 30 May 2023, with a black-and-white video directed by Nyte, who also created the single's cover art. "Cinnamon" followed in July with a video that intercut Nyte's performance with the silhouette of a ballerina, and "Horses" on 2 August. A self-directed video for "The Garden" was released with the album.

Autumn's Children was released on 25 August 2023 on CD, vinyl and digital download. The companion book, Nyte's second, collects the album's lyrics with poetry, short stories and other writings that expand on its themes.

== Critical reception ==
Regan praised Nyte as "a singer's singer ... with a warm, velvety baritone" and recommended listening on headphones, describing the album as thoughtful and thought-provoking rather than background music. Of "Secret Love", she wrote that it "can do a lot of rather sweet damage to the heart" in just over two minutes. Ryan Martin of Jammerzine praised its lyrics and Nyte's voice for conveying to listeners that they are not alone. Andrew Frolish of Americana UK described the vocal on "Cinnamon" as low, vulnerable and intimate. American Songwriter included the album in its list of the top 17 albums of 2023, summing it up as "Life, art, death, and magic, and the endless blurred cycle of it all."

== Track listing ==
| No. | Title | Writer(s) | Length |
|---|---|---|---|
| 1. | "The Garden" | Ashton Nyte | 2:56 |
| 2. | "Into the Dream" | Nyte | 3:36 |
| 3. | "Something Beautiful" | Nyte | 3:11 |
| 4. | "Rivers Run Black" | Nyte | 3:36 |
| 5. | "Horses" | Nyte | 4:08 |
| 6. | "Cinnamon" | Nyte | 2:46 |
| 7. | "Secret Love" | Sammy Fain, Paul Francis Webster | 2:13 |
| 8. | "Go to Sleep" | Nyte | 2:49 |
| 9. | "The Little Ones" | Nyte | 1:21 |
| 10. | "Trapped Inside the World" | Nyte | 4:19 |
| 11. | "Your Story" | Nyte | 2:22 |
| Total length: | | | 33:17 |

== Personnel ==
- Ashton Nyte – vocals, instruments, production, mixing
