= The Valley (Ashton Nyte album) =

2009 studio album by Ashton Nyte

Studio album by Ashton Nyte
- Released: 2009 (South Africa); 15 June 2010 (United States)
- Recorded: December 2003 – December 2007
- Studios: Intervention Studios, Johannesburg
- Genres: Alternative country; Americana
- Length: 37:36
- Labels: CapeTown Sound; Intervention Arts
- Producer: Ashton Nyte

Ashton Nyte chronology
Headspace (2005)	The Valley (2009)	Moederland (2014)

Singles from The Valley
- 1. "Jennifer"; 2. "The Carnival"; 3. "A Little Low"

The Valley is the fifth solo studio album by South African singer-songwriter Ashton Nyte. Recorded in Johannesburg before his move to the United States, it was released in South Africa in 2009 and in the United States on 15 June 2010, with new artwork and packaging, as his American debut. A spare, largely acoustic record with an American and Western theme, it moved away from the glam rock of his earlier solo work towards Americana and alternative country; Nyte called it "the most American album I've made", and LEO Weekly described it as "more Man in Black than Ziggy".

== Background and recording ==
Nyte wrote, recorded and produced The Valley over several sessions between December 2003 and December 2007, using a portable studio and Intervention Studios in Johannesburg, and played all of its instruments himself. He had previously treated his solo records as side projects alongside The Awakening, but said that with The Valley he "put everything on hold", and the band went on an extended hiatus. The album was completed shortly before he moved to the United States.

== Music and lyrics ==
Nyte described the album as his own version of "an Americana/alt-country/lo-fi type of experience", and elsewhere as "a hybrid of post-punk and alt-folk". He said the influence of American music on his work, "from Elvis to Cash", could not be overestimated, and that the album "reflects many dark, yet romantic ideas of early America". LEO Weekly noted its spare arrangements built around Nyte's baritone. Its ten songs deal with lost love, drugs and salvation, and reviewer Mandy Southgate heard the influence of Johnny Cash, Lou Reed and Nick Cave, while describing the album as "a very personal journey" rather than a simple tribute to them.

The title track, which opens the album, is described in the sleeve notes as a "rough demo", and evokes a desolate place in South Africa where the album's journey begins. Southgate singled out the alternative-country hook of "Dead Man's Road", the religious imagery of "Salvation" and the guitar hook of "Pale Horse", and described the first single, "Jennifer", as a song about lost love.

== Release ==
The Valley was first released in South Africa in 2009 by CapeTown Sound. Intervention Arts released it in the United States on 15 June 2010, using the same recordings with different artwork and digipak packaging. "Jennifer", "The Carnival" and "A Little Low" were released as singles; the video for "Jennifer" premiered on the website Pop Culture Madness ahead of the album's American release. Nyte then made his first solo tour of the United States, opening at Fontana's in New York on 29 June 2010 and playing St. Louis, Chicago, Minneapolis, Des Moines, Austin, Houston, New Orleans, Louisville and Washington, D.C. through July. He also performed live on the Voice of America programme Border Crossings.

== Critical reception ==
Professional ratings
Review scores
Source	Rating
Addicted to Media	5/5 stars

Southgate gave the album five out of five stars, comparing its emotional depth and imagery of wide open spaces to U2's The Joshua Tree, and wrote that it "stirs up all sorts of emotions". Previewing his Minneapolis show for the St. Paul Pioneer Press, Ross Raihala wrote that the album had "earned raves for its unique take on Americana themes". LEO Weekly's Mat Herron described it as a "dusty postcard" that traded glam for country-tinged Americana. In 2010 Public Radio International's The World featured Nyte and The Valley in a segment on South Africa's alternative rock scene, and in 2015 the Cape Times counted it among the solo albums he had released "to critical acclaim".

== Track listing ==
No.	Title	Writer(s)	Length
1.	"The Valley"	Ashton Nyte	3:47
2.	"Jennifer"	Nyte	4:10
3.	"Dead Man's Road"	Nyte	3:04
4.	"Without Warning"	Nyte	3:28
5.	"A Little Low"	Nyte	3:13
6.	"Medicine"	Nyte	2:20
7.	"Salvation"	Nyte	4:40
8.	"Pale Horse"	Nyte	4:03
9.	"The Carnival"	Nyte	4:49
10.	"Uncertain Light"	Nyte	4:02
Total length:			37:36

== Personnel ==
- Ashton Nyte – vocals, all instruments, recording, production
