= Ethereal Menace =

1999 studio album by The Awakening

Studio album by The Awakening
- Released: July 1999
- Studio: NytesounD Studios
- Genres: Gothic rock; Darkwave; Industrial rock
- Length: 45:25
- Label: Intervention Arts
- Producer: Ashton Nyte

The Awakening chronology
Request (1998)	Ethereal Menace (1999)	The Fourth Seal of Zeen (2000)

Singles from Ethereal Menace
- 1. "The March" Released: July 1999; 2. "Sentimental Runaways" Released: November 1999

Ethereal Menace is the third studio album by the South African gothic rock band The Awakening, released in July 1999 through Intervention Arts. Ashton Nyte wrote, performed and produced the album, which brought industrial elements into the band's sound, a style Nyte later called "dark future rock". It was accompanied by two companion EPs, The March and Sentimental Runaways.

== Recording ==
Nyte wrote, performed, engineered and produced Ethereal Menace, beginning work in November 1998. The album was mastered by Graham Handley at Sweet 16.

== Music ==
The band's website describes the album as "multi-layered, atmospheric soundscapes of guitar-oriented dark-wave". Nyte has described Ethereal Menace as introducing the industrial-influenced sound he called "dark future rock", a step on from the guitar-driven gothic rock of Risen (1997) and the New Romantic electronics of Request (1998).

The album closes with "The March", in two parts, and "Dreams in Fire".

== Release ==
Intervention Arts released Ethereal Menace in July 1999, alongside The March, the first of two companion discs to the album. It featured a single version of "The March", the extended "Raising Flames" version, and two non-album songs, "Above" and "The Tyrant". A second companion EP, Sentimental Runaways, followed in November 1999. A music video for "The March" was directed by South African Music Awards winner Eban Olivier of Concrete Productions, and was placed in rotation on MTV Europe.

== Critical reception ==
Alex Figgis of Cross Rhythms praised the album's complex keyboard arrangements over moody guitar and understated piano, and lyrics with depth that rewarded close study, concluding that it "may well be Nyte's best work to date".

== Track listing ==
All tracks are written by Ashton Nyte.

No.	Title	Length
1.	"In Etherea"	4:06
2.	"Naked"	4:25
3.	"Chains"	4:29
4.	"Wasted Miracle"	3:43
5.	"Still the Sun"	3:41
6.	"Sentimental Runaways"	5:39
7.	"Nostalgia"	5:57
8.	"The March (Part I)"	5:40
9.	"The March (Part II)"	3:01
10.	"Dreams in Fire"	4:44
Total length:		45:25
