= The Fourth Seal of Zeen =

2000 studio album by The Awakening

Studio album by The Awakening
- Released: 3 November 2000
- Studios: Intervention Studios, Johannesburg
- Genres: Gothic rock; Darkwave
- Length: 73:01
- Label: Intervention Arts
- Producer: Ashton Nyte

The Awakening chronology
Ethereal Menace (1999)	The Fourth Seal of Zeen (2000)	Roadside Heretics (2002)

Singles from The Fourth Seal of Zeen
- 1. "The Dark Romantics"

The Fourth Seal of Zeen is the fourth studio album by the South African gothic rock band The Awakening, released on 3 November 2000 through Intervention Arts. Ashton Nyte wrote and produced it in an intense two-week session, and it includes "The Dark Romantics", which he has called the band's "best-loved song", "played at goth clubs worldwide for 25 years".

== Background and recording ==
Nyte made The Fourth Seal of Zeen soon after his first solo album, The Slender Nudes (2000), which followed three Awakening albums in quick succession and a period of constant touring. About six months after The Slender Nudes, he said, "I locked myself in the studio for about two weeks with very little sleep. 'The Fourth Seal of Zeen' just came out of me." He described reaching "a state of almost hallucinating" during the sessions, and added: "I don't advise people try this, but that's how that album happened."

Nyte wrote and produced the album and designed its packaging. The band's website describes it as a "swirling ode" to what Nyte called "a surrealistic, dream-like state or place".

== Release ==
Intervention Arts released The Fourth Seal of Zeen in South Africa on 3 November 2000, first as a limited edition and then in a standard edition in 2001. A Russian edition followed on CD-Maximum in 2004. The CD ends with a hidden track, a version of "Amazing Grace".

== "The Dark Romantics" ==
In 2026 Nyte described "The Dark Romantics" as the band's "best-loved song" and "our most streamed song, played at goth clubs worldwide for 25 years". The band later revisited the song on the compilations Sacrificial Etchings (2002) and Anthology XV (2013).

== Track listing ==
All songs written by Ashton Nyte, except "Amazing Grace" (traditional).

No.	Title	Length
1.	"Precious (A Shard)"	2:36
2.	"Stigma"	6:09
3.	"Amethyst"	4:54
4.	"A Promise of Zeen"	1:03
5.	"The Dark Romantics"	4:41
6.	"Eve"	5:20
7.	"Prophet"	5:16
8.	"Zeen"	7:38
9.	"The Other Garden"	3:31
10.	"Ward"	3:04
11.	"The Harmony of Imperfection"	5:56
12.	"Missing Chapters"	5:06
13.	"Figment"	2:02
14.	"Precious"	7:22
15.	"Amazing Grace" (hidden track; traditional)	2:18
Total length:		73:01

== Personnel ==
- Ashton Nyte – songwriting, production, package design
- Hein Gates – photography
