= Jim Neversink =

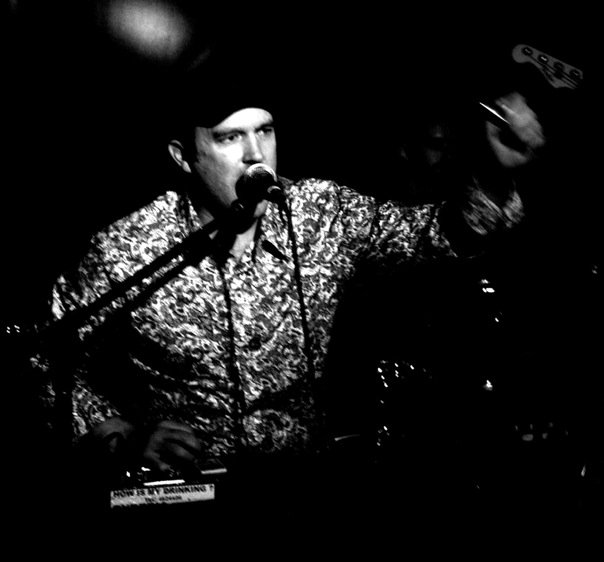
- Neversink performing at Mojo, Copenhagen, February 2010

Background information
- Born: Michael James Whitehead; 16 June 1969 (age 57); Durban, Natal, South Africa
- Genres: Indie rock, Americana, country, alternative country, punk
- Occupations: Singer-songwriter, musician
- Years active: 1990–present
- Labels: Ent Entertainment; Radio Lava
- Website: jimneversink.com

Jim Neversink (born Michael James Whitehead; 16 June 1969) is a South African musician, singer and songwriter. His musical style spans indie rock, country, americana and punk.

He is best known as a solo artist who performs with changing line-ups. As such, he has released three albums to critical acclaim. Despite being released on independent labels, two of them were included in lists of best album of the year in South African magazines as well as in Billboard. Three South African newspapers also listed Neversink albums among their albums of the decade.

Before he went solo, Neversink was the co-founder and lead guitarist of Famous Curtain Trick, a country/pop/rock band which rose to mainstream popularity in South Africa in the 1990s and was nominated for a SAMA Award.

His most notable instrument is the guitar, including a home-built lap steel guitar.

== Childhood and early youth ==
Neversink was born in Durban on 16 June 1969. Growing up in Durban, he would listen to jazz, blues and country at home. He took up the guitar at the age of eighteen.

== 1990's: Early career ==
=== Famous Curtain Trick ===
In the early nineties, Neversink and Nadine Raal founded the pop-rock-country band Famous Curtain Trick, which performed songs written mainly by Neversink and Raal. The band consisted of lead singer/guitarist Raal, Neversink on guitar, lap steel and backing vocals, Garth Johnstone, later Duncan Smith on bass, and in the early stages Kevin O'Grady, then Warren Peddie, later Craig Nash on drums.

They released Famous Curtain Trick (EMI, 1995; produced by Neill Solomon) and Land of no Cadillacs (Universal, 1996; produced by Dave Birch, front man of Squeal, previously guitarist in The Camera Club), nominated for a South African Music Award in the category "Best Pop Album". Live performances included the music festivals Splashy Fen (1995, 1997, 1999), Wingerdstok (1997), Oppikoppi (1997), Southern Cross Folk & Rock Festival (2000) as well as opening for Roxette in Durban (1995) and touring South Africa with Bryan Adams (1999). In 2000, the band split up.

=== Other collaborations ===
For a while, Neversink formed part of the alternative country/lo-fi rock band Lilo. He appears on bass on the band's first album Light me up a Lucifer (2002). Other members were, at the time, Alexander Sudheim, Graeme Barnes and Dean Henning.

He appears on lap steel on "Calling" off Syd Kitchen's album Africa's not for sissies (2001).

== 2000–2009 ==
Jim Neversink

Studio album by Jim Neversink
- Released: 2005
- Genres: Indie rock, americana, alternative country, punk
- Length: 41:50
- Label: Ent Entertainment
- Producer: Matthew Fink

In 2001, Neversink moved to Johannesburg and began using the artistic name Jim Neversink.

=== Jim Neversink (Ent Entertainment 2005) ===
Neversink's self-titled solo debut album was produced by Matthew Fink. Recorded partly under primitive circumstances in Neversink's bedroom, it was nominated "Album of the Year" by The Star, pronouncing it "a masterpiece that will no doubt stand the test of time". Beeld listed it among the "Top-Ten Albums" of the year, and, at the turn of the decade, included it in a list of South African albums of the decade. Channel24.co.za had it on their five-item list of "South African releases of the year", giving it five stars out of five. Their review, which likewise referred to the album as a "South African masterpiece", awarded it five stars out of five, remarking that "Neversink and Matthew Fink have produced a benchmark album, seemingly out of nowhere."

The CD has Jim Neversink on voice, guitar, lap steel, piano and harmonica, Matthew Fink on accordion and guitar and Katherine Hunt on bass, violin and backing vocals. Two tracks feature Paul "Roach" Cochrane on bass and Ashton Nyte on lead guitar.

=== Shakey is Good (Radio Lava, 2008) ===
Shakey is Good

Studio album by Jim Neversink
- Released: 2008
- Genres: Indie rock, americana, alternative country, punk
- Length: 40:14
- Label: Ent Entertainment
- Producer: Matthew Fink

Jim Neversink chronology
Jim Neversink (2005)	Shakey is Good (2008)

A second album, with Fink, Hunt and now Warrick Poultney on drums, and produced by Fink, likewise earned critics' acclaim: it came in as No. 2 on The Times' international "Top 20 albums" of 2008; Billboard's South African correspondent placed it as no 6 on her international list of "2008 Billboard Critics Top 10s"; Isolation.tv placed it as no 1 on their top-10 "South African albums of the year". The Times and Mail & Guardian included it in its listings of "albums of the decade". Channel24.co.za awarded it five out of five stars.

=== Live performances ===
Live appearances with the Fink/Hunt/Poultney line-up included performing at the London Forum as support act for Sixto Rodriguez (2005) and at the Oppikoppi festival (2006), the White Mountain Folk Festival (2006) and the Splashy Fen (2007).

=== Other collaborations ===
Television actor and singer Emmanuel Castis performs one of Neversink's songs, "Stay", on South of Nowhere (Next Music (Pty) Ltd, 2008). The song "Mail Order Russian Bride" (off Jim Neversink) is included on Southern Gems – 18 Flawless Tracks from SA Stars (Sheer Sound, 2007). "Monkey" off Shakey Is Good is included in Beginner's Guide to South Africa (Nascente, 2010).

Neversink contributes backing vocal and slide guitar on the song "Stranger" by Laurie Levine (Unspoken: Beyond The Box Music, 2006) as well as backing vocal on her song "Scrambling" (Living Room: Beyond The Box Music, 2009).

He contributes slide-guitar on the song "Son" on Radio Kalahari Orkes's 2009 CD Heuningland.

== 2010–2019 ==
Skinny Girls Are Trouble

Studio album by Jim Neversink
- Released: 2010
- Genres: Indie rock, americana, alternative country, punk
- Label: One F
- Producer: Richard Lloyd

Jim Neversink chronology
Shakey Is Good (2008)	Skinny Girls Are Trouble (2010)

=== Skinny Girls Are Trouble (One F, 2010) ===
2010 saw Neversink relocating to Copenhagen, Denmark and releasing his third album, Skinny Girls Are Trouble.

Shortly after the launch of Shakey is Good, he had begun to perform with Loandi Boersma (bass) and Kevin O'Grady (drums) and various guest performers. This is also the line-up of the third album which has guest performances from Rian Malan, Lani Pieters and Timon Wapenaar.

The album was produced in Johannesburg and New York by Richard Lloyd, former member of the new wave/punk rock band Television, and engineered, mixed and mastered by Peter Pearlson. An internet blog was set up to document the pre-production and recording processes.

Released in September 2010, Skinny Girls Are Trouble has so far only been reviewed by the Mail & Guardian which called it "arguably Neversink's finest hour and easily one of the best South African albums released in 2010" and also included in a list of "10 South African songs that rocked my world in 2010".

=== Copenhagen Collaborations ===
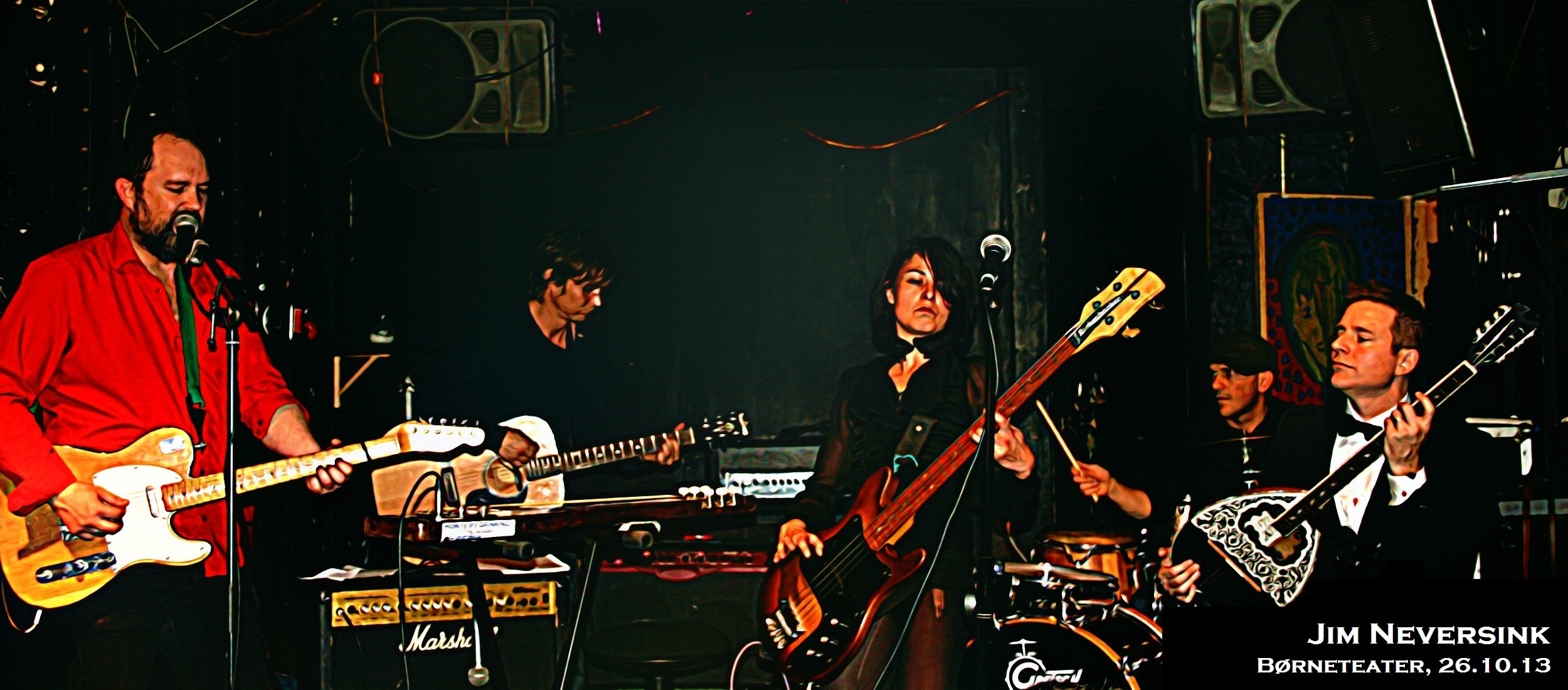
Jim Neversink Børneteater October 2013

Neversink has formed a new band for Jim Neversink in Copenhagen, while playing a number of guest spots at live concerts, playing guitar and lapsteel with a number of local acts, including Gutten & Gutten and the 'bluegaze' group Me After You.

In 2014 he was a founding member of Frederiksberg Country Club, a local scene for live experimental music of all genres.

He performed at Frederiksberg Country Club in 2016, in an outfit with Leonard Seabrooke (bass) and Metthe Mathiesen (drums) and again in 2019, this time with Nils Lassen (guitar), Sara Saxild (bass) and Mette Mathiesen (drums).

=== Other collaborations and activities ===
In 2013, Neversink wrote the score for Durban Poison, a crime/love story by South African film director Andrew Worsdale, that won 'Best South African Feature Film' at the 34th Durban International Film Festival in July 2013.

Neversink's score, noted as 'hypnotic' by one reviewer, was given a special jury award in the "Long Narratives competition" at the 3rd Luxor African Film Festival in 2014.

In 2015 he contributed a rendition of Afrikaans poet Ingrid Jonker's ‘Bitterbessie dagbreek’ to the compilation CD "Die kind is nog jonger".

== 2020–present ==
=== No Wah-Wah (Present Records / The Good Times Co 2023) ===
"No Wah-Wah" was an EP released in March 2024, featuring four songs by Neversink (Man's Best Friend, Wall out Songs, Dagga and Liefe) and a cover of Master Jack by David Marks. The albut was produced by Matthew Fink. The Daily Maverick Wrote: "With its underpinning drone, EP opener “Man’s Best Friend” comes by way of The Beatles’ The White Album and Velvet Underground's Venus in Furs. Unsettling in its telling of someone whose dogs “hate him so much they would rather eat him”, the cracked details of the lyric (“listening to a phone laying on its side/the voice is small and whining/packing all the things I need to hide/when I go out walking”) make for a setting that each listener will fill in for herself. The sketch and the plasticity of Neversink's lyrical screenplay is an unsettled piece that the listener completes on listening – and never less than uneasily. You fill in the details and wonder what they mean and what they say about Neversink. And, disconcertingly, about what that might say about you." The album's artwork was by Danish designer and artist Thomas Winkler.

== Lyrics ==
Neversink's lyrics have been the subject of special acclaim; the Mail & Guardian, upon the release of Shakey is Good, pronounced him "one of the finest songwriters in South Africa". The Star justified a no-1 placement on a best-albums list by referring to "the raw emotion, the intelligent songwriting which he has crafted beautifully"; and The Times remarked: "No one comes close to Jim Neversink in making observations about the small details of living in South African towns sound so cinematic (...) Neversink’s off-kilter way of looking at society’s damaged things stands alone." Channel24.co.za speaks of "moments of Sparklehorse brilliance, and (...) a Jim White feel to the strange tales of peri-urban paranoia and quixotic questing."

Love, together with death and longing for life on the other side, are recurring themes on both albums; the angle is often darkly romantic, occasionally humorous and defiant. Some songs would appear to be personal and autobiographical; thus, "Always dreaming about you" and "Angel" (off Jim Neversink), the former dedicated to his late father, the latter to an ex-girlfriend. Others, like "Monkey" (off Shakey Is Good) or "Transfer to Harding" (off Jim Neversink), are narrative-driven ballads about life's outsiders. Similarly, "Ride, Ride Ride" (off Jim Neversink) was written with bank-robber Andre Stander in mind; the title of "Even Elizabeth Klarer" (off Shakey Is Good) refers to a famous alien abductee, and the protagonist of "Klackerty Kate" is a statuette of a disabled girl, placed in supermarkets to collect funds for Polio research.

Neversink sings in South African English, his mother tongue. As can be seen from the examples mentioned in the preceding paragraph, the songs contain many references to life in South Africa. Additional examples (all from Skinny Girls are Trouble) are: in "Hope", the protagonist, a young girl, jumps off Van Stadens Bridge, known to attract suicidals; Emmarentia Dam which sets the scene for "Tambourine" is a recreative area in Johannesburg; and Steve Hofmeyr mentioned in "Durban City Hall" is a popular singer of Afrikaans pop.

== Influences and musical style ==
Whereas some journalists have dubbed Neversink "a modern-day Johnny Cash" and "SA's answer to Johnny Cash", others place him in the vicinity of Chris Isaak, the Jayhawks, Wilco and Calexico and detect influences from Lead Belly and Loretta Lynn. He himself has labelled his music "loserbilly". He has expressed his admiration for artists and bands as Lou Reed, The Beach Boys, The Band, Hank Williams, Emmylou Harris, Harry Nilsson, The Beatles, The Flying Burrito Brothers, Gram Parsons and Slim Whitman. The song "Always Dreaming of You" (off Jim Neversink) contains a reference to Slim Whitman and quotes his hit "Rose Marie". The word "Shakey" in the title of his second album is, partly, a reference to Neil Young's pseudonym, Bernard Shakey.

Jim Neversink playing live with Matthew Fink on accordion, Warrick Poultney on drums and Katherine Hunt on violin. Cellardoor Live, Johannesburg 2007.
