= Dirt Sense =

2002 studio album by Ashton Nyte

Studio album by Ashton Nyte
- Released: 30 April 2002
- Recorded: 2002
- Studios: Intervention Arts, Johannesburg
- Genre: Alternative rock
- Length: 50:40
- Label: Intervention Arts
- Producer: Ashton Nyte

Ashton Nyte chronology
The Slender Nudes (2000)	Dirt Sense (2002)	Sinister Swing (2003)

Singles from Dirt Sense
- 1. "Sick of This"; 2. "Window"; 3. "Splinters"

Dirt Sense is the second solo studio album by the South African musician Ashton Nyte, frontman of the gothic rock band The Awakening. It was released on 30 April 2002 through Intervention Arts, two years after his first solo album, The Slender Nudes. Nyte sang and played all of the instruments himself. The album spent 17 weeks on the SA Rock Digest South African album chart, peaking at number two, and its song "Stained" reached number one on the publication's South African songs chart. A second edition, remixed and remastered with a bonus disc of B-sides and outtakes, followed in 2005.

== Release and promotion ==
Dirt Sense was launched on 30 April 2002. Nyte described it as "vastly different from my first solo album", taking a dirtier, stripped-down approach to rock and roll that was not tied to a genre. The first single, "Sick of This", was played on national and college radio in South Africa, and on 31 May Nyte performed a short in-store set at CD Wherehouse at the V&A Waterfront in Cape Town, drawing on both The Slender Nudes and the new album. He then toured the album in June 2002, playing the Independent Armchair Theatre in Observatory, Cape Town, The Winston in Durban, The Jam in Margate and Up the Creek in Hatfield, Pretoria, along with free unplugged in-store shows in Durban and Pretoria billed as the "Glorious Revolution of the People". At the National Arts Festival in Grahamstown he also played an impromptu unplugged show while appearing in the stage production My Bloody Valentine, and repeated both at the end of July at the University of Pretoria's Krekvars Arts Festival. "Window" and "Splinters" followed as singles, and a music video was made for "Window".

== Reissue ==
In 2005 Dirt Sense was reissued in a second edition, remixed and remastered, with a bonus disc of four B-sides and outtakes, among them Nyte's version of "Fever".

== Chart performance ==
Dirt Sense entered the SA Rock Digest Top 20 South African Albums chart at number 17 in the week of 3 June 2002, climbing to number 7 the following week and reaching its peak of number two on 1 July. It spent 17 weeks on the chart.

"Stained" entered the Top 20 South African Songs chart at number 20 the same week, and rose through numbers 12, 6 and 3 to reach number one on 1 July 2002. It spent one week at the top, and the SA Rock Digest later ranked it 19th among the top 50 South African songs of 2002.

== Critical reception ==
Reviewing the album in the SA Rock Digest, a writer called Dirt Sense "a powerful album with strong tunes and hard-hitting lyrics". The review endorsed Stephen Segerman's description of Nyte, on SAfm, as the "chameleon of SA rock", and traced the album's influences to Lou Reed, Bono, David Bowie, Tom Waits and Andrew Eldritch. It also quoted the album's back cover: "Long live dirty Rock 'n Roll".

== Track listing ==
All tracks are written by Ashton Nyte.

No.	Title	Length
1.	"Conclusion"	0:50
2.	"Sick of This"	4:20
3.	"Valentine"	4:30
4.	"Stained"	4:26
5.	"Eloquent Verbosity"	3:52
6.	"Automation"	3:37
7.	"Clean Again"	3:58
8.	"Window"	4:50
9.	"Down"	4:43
10.	"The Other Band"	3:26
11.	"New Messiah of the Week"	4:24
12.	"Splinters"	3:59
13.	"Consequence"	3:45
Total length:		50:40

2005 edition bonus disc
No.	Title	Length
1.	"Plastic Industry"	4:00
2.	"Fever" (Eddie Cooley, Otis Blackwell)	3:45
3.	"Trite"	4:16
4.	"The Summer the Sun Ignored"	5:44
