= Request (The Awakening album) =

1998 studio album by The Awakening

Studio album by The Awakening
- Released: April 1998
- Recorded: 1997
- Studio: NytesounD Studios
- Genres: Gothic rock; Darkwave; New Romantic
- Label: Intervention Arts (1999 reissue)
- Producer: Ashton Nyte

The Awakening chronology
Risen (1997)	Request (1998)	Ethereal Menace (1999)

Singles from Request
- 1. "Maree"; 2. "Rain"; 3. "Before I Leap"

Request is the second studio album by the South African gothic rock band The Awakening, released in April 1998 and reissued by Intervention Arts with bonus tracks in March 1999. On it Ashton Nyte moved the band towards the electronic sound of the 1980s New Romantic movement. Its singles were "Maree", which topped the charts, "Rain" and "Before I Leap".

== Music ==
After the guitar-driven gothic rock of Risen (1997), Request drew on New Romantic electronics. The band's website described it as calmer, mellower and darker than its predecessor. Reviewing the reissue, Alex Figgis of Cross Rhythms wrote that it "still has one foot planted firmly in the '80s", but that Nyte had "come up with a slightly more contemporary sounding work of art", using newer technology to add "extra dynamics to Nyte's industrial soundscapes, mixing darkwave atmospheres with solid guitar playing".

== Release ==
Request was released in April 1998. Its singles "Maree", "Rain" and "Before I Leap" were played on radio and in clubs, and "Maree" went on to top the charts. A music video for "Rain" was directed by Katinka Harrod.

In March 1999 Intervention Arts reissued the album with bonus tracks, including a cover of Men Without Hats' "The Safety Dance".

== Critical reception ==
Figgis rated the reissue seven out of ten in Cross Rhythms. He singled out "the darkwave subtleties of the title track and the straight ahead goth rock mood and tone of 'In the Unholy'", though he felt that "the music does suffer from a lack of live drums". Overall he found Request "a coherent musical journey made up of a variety of musical textures, resulting in an oddly compelling work of art that awaits both exploration and appreciation by those with goth rock tastes".

== Track listing ==
All songs written by Ashton Nyte, except where noted.

No.	Title	Length
1.	"Request"
2.	"To Give"
3.	"Rain"
4.	"Carnival"
5.	"Before I Leap"
6.	"Maree"
7.	"Tamzin"
8.	"Marked"
9.	"In the Unholy"
10.	"Where Roses Grow"
11.	"Myst"

1999 reissue bonus tracks
No.	Title	Length
12.	"Before I Leap" (Dub-Coma Mix)
13.	"The Safety Dance" (Ivan Doroschuk; Men Without Hats cover)
14.	"Request" (Reprise)
