= Matthew Mole =

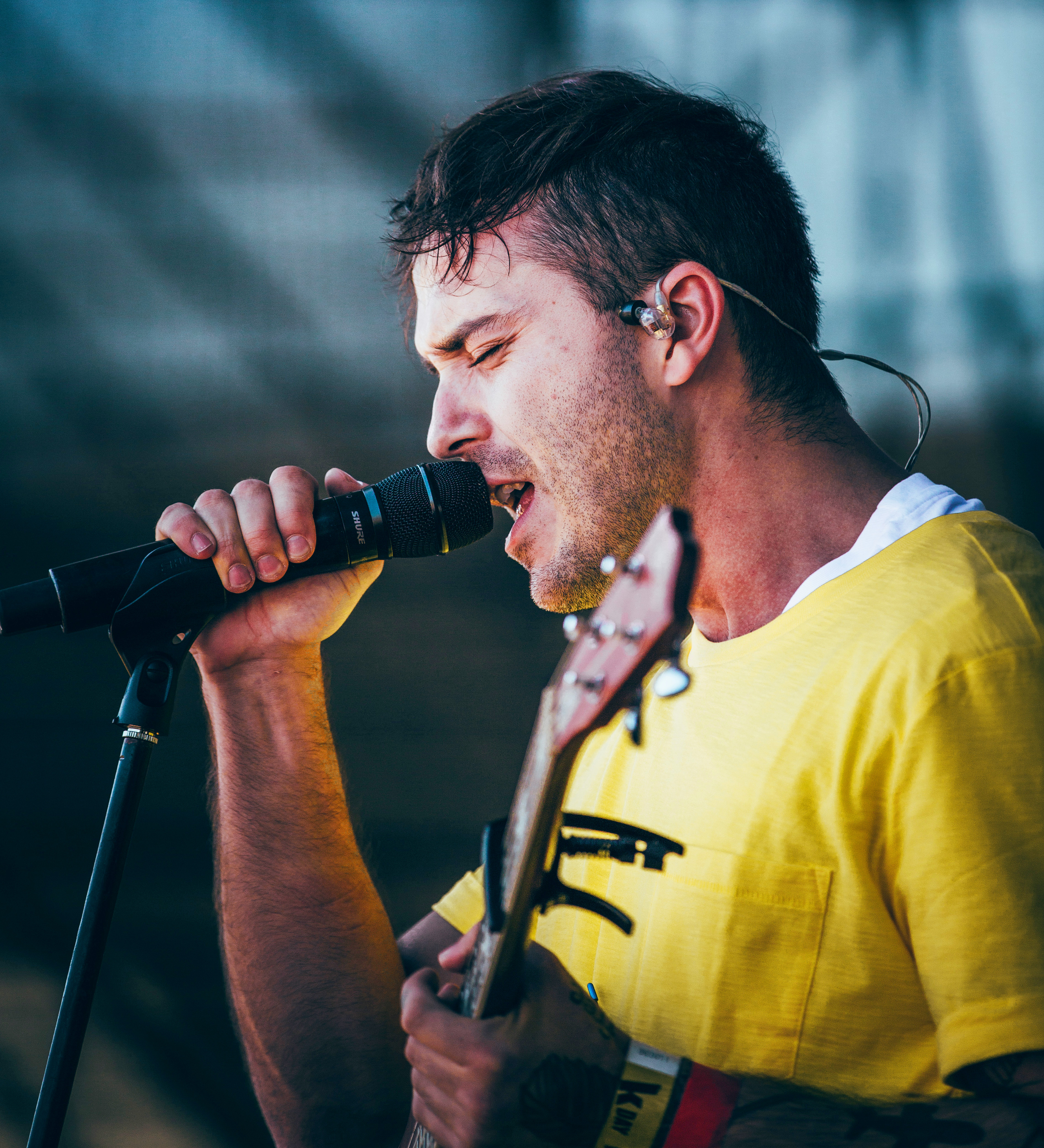
- Mole performing live at Huawei Kday

Background information
- Born: Matthew Joseph Mole; 28 October 1991 (age 34); Cape Town, South Africa
- Origin: Empangeni, South Africa
- Genres: Pop
- Occupations: Musician, songwriter, singer
- Instruments: Vocal, acoustic guitar, electric guitar, banjo, banjolele, piano, ukulele, drums
- Years active: 2011–present
- Label: Universal Music Group
- Spouse: Jessica Anne Mole (m. 2015)
- Website: https://www.matthewmole.com

Matthew Joseph Mole (born 28 October 1991) is a South African singer-songwriter from Cape Town, South Africa. He is the winner of the South African Music Awards record of the year 2021.

== Early life and education ==
Matthew Mole is from Fish Hoek in Cape Town.

Mole's father taught him how to play the guitar. He later learned how to play ukulele, banjo, piano, organ, and drums. He started writing his own music at the end of high school. According to Mole, his approach to writing music involves starting with a lyrical idea, a rhythm or a melody, and then recording different instruments and switching back and forth between them to build a finished song.

Mole studied music production in Cape Town in 2010.

== Career ==
His independent EP You Did Well, Kid was released online in 2011. He also opened his other singles for free on the Internet. In August 2012, he won Converse's Get Out of the Garage competition, which awarded him a gig in London's 100 Club and a recording session at Converse's studio in New York. After winning the competition, he signed to Just Music and released his second EP, Same Parts, Same Heart, in December 2012. His song from the EP, "Same Parts, Same Heart," was included in the soundtrack of the film Leading Lady.

Mole recorded and released his debut studio album, The Home We Built, in 2013. The album was produced by Matthew Fink. Mole became the first South African artist to enter the iTunes SA chart at #1 on the first day of releasing his debut album. The album received nominations for Male Artist of the Year, Best Pop Album, and Best Engineer of the Year (Matthew Fink). Mole also received a nomination for Best Newcomer in the MK Awards.

His second album, Run, was released in 2016, followed by Ghost, released in November 2019. Run was ranked number 1 on South Africa's iTunes within three months of release, and the single "Run" achieved Gold Status within three months of release. At the 23rd Annual South African Music Awards, the album was nominated for Best Pop Album, Best Produced Album, and Record of the Year.

Mole describes his musical style as folk with an electronica influence. In live performances, Mole can be seen playing guitar, synth, kick drum, and triggered beats at the same time. He has performed at festivals such as 5FM's Cape Town Live Loud, 947's Joburg Day, East Coast Radio's Durban Day, Oppikoppi, Rocking the Daisies, K Day, the Kirstenbosch Summer Sunset Concert, Redhill School's Redfest, and the Seattle International Film Festival. He has performed in South Africa, the UK, the US, Thailand, and Russia.

In 2020, Mole campaigned with Marine Protected Areas (MPAs) and NPO, WILDTRUST to raise awareness for ocean protection. He and his wife Jess are featured in a video highlighting the importance of oceans to the environment.

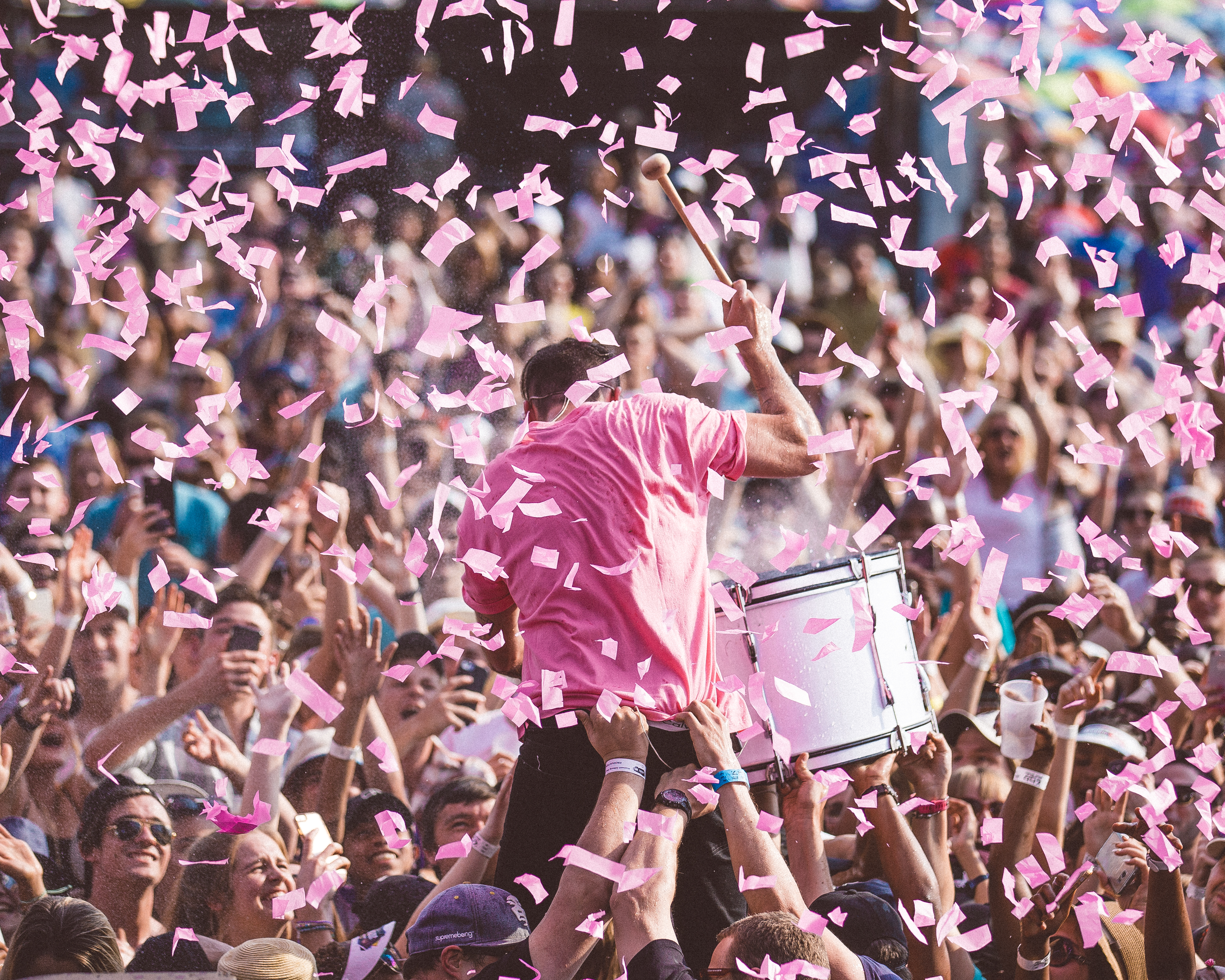
Matthew Mole performing at Huawei Joburg Day

== Discography ==
Year	Album	Comments
2013	The Home We Built	Released 29 July 2013
2016	Run	Album
2019	Ghost	Album
2020	Ghost Live	Live versions of songs from previous album
2023	Wake Up, It's Morning	Album

Year	EP / Single	Comments
2011	You did Well, Kid	EP
2012	Same Parts, Same Heart	EP
2020	Pennsylvania	Single
2020	Keep It Together	EP
2020	Honey, I'm Home	EP
2020	Fall	EP
2020	Silent Night	Single (Cover)
2021	I'm With You	Single

== Awards ==
- Winner of Converse's Get Out of the Garage Competition
- The 20th Annual South African Music Awards Nominee for Male Artist of the Year and Best Pop Album (2014)
- An MK Awards nomination in the Newcomer category.
- He is the winner of the South African Music Awards record of the year 2021.
