= The Awakening (The Awakening album) =

Studio album by The Awakening
- Released: 18 October 2024
- Genres: Gothic rock; dark wave; post-punk
- Label: Intervention Arts
- Producer: Ashton Nyte

The Awakening chronology
The Passage Remains (2022)	The Awakening (2024)	The Lost Theatre (2026)

Singles from The Awakening
- 1. "Mirror Midnight" Released: 4 September 2024; 2. "Haunting" Released: February 2025; 3. "Through the Veil" Released: April 2025

The Awakening is the twelfth studio album by the South African gothic rock band The Awakening, released on 18 October 2024 through Intervention Arts, the band's own label. As with the band's earlier records, Ashton Nyte wrote the album, played all of the instruments, and produced, mixed and mastered it himself. Nyte described the album as a return to the band's roots after the heavier and more electronic sound of This Alchemy (2021) and The Passage Remains (2022).

The album was preceded by the single "Mirror Midnight" and followed by the singles "Haunting" and "Through the Veil". It entered Germany's Deutsche Alternative Charts at number 3, and was supported by the Haunting Tour, the band's first full tour in nine years.

== Background and recording ==
After This Alchemy and The Passage Remains, Nyte set out to return to the classic gothic rock that had first inspired the band. He said that while making it he "fell in love all over again" with the bands and records that had made him want to make music in the first place. In the period before its release he had also published his second book, released the solo album Autumn's Children and continued working with the collective Beauty in Chaos.

Nyte wrote and performed the album alone, as on most of the band's releases.

== Music and lyrics ==
Reviewers placed the album firmly in the tradition of first-wave gothic rock. Christopher Nosnibor of Aural Aggravation compared it to the debut album of The Sisters of Mercy, to The Mission's Children and to Bauhaus, describing it as a renewal of the classic goth template rather than an imitation of it. Myth of Rock described a blend of darkwave, gothic rock, post-punk, electronic rock and folk noir, with cinematic, layered production built around Nyte's baritone. Regen's Ilker Yücel heard guitars thick with chorus, flange and phase effects over a steady bass, and noted that Nyte pushed his vocal range lower on "See You Fall" and higher on "Cabaret".

"Mirror Midnight" addresses self-obsession and the way mass and social media manipulate how people see themselves. "Haunting" is a tribute to classic gothic rock and post-punk, set to campy B-movie horror imagery, which Nyte described as a deliberately lighter "wink at the camera" after the social commentary of "Mirror Midnight". "Through the Veil" tells of someone who has died but wishes to stay near the person they love.

== Release and promotion ==
"Mirror Midnight" was released with a monochrome video, shot by Nyte, on 4 September 2024, when the album was announced. The album was released on CD, vinyl and digitally on 18 October 2024. "Mirror Midnight" also appeared on the cover CD of the November 2024 issue of the German magazine Sonic Seducer.

"Haunting" followed as the second single in February 2025, with a video directed by Nyte, and "Through the Veil" followed in April 2025, accompanied by a three-track EP collecting the three singles.

The band supported the album with the Haunting Tour, which ran from July to December 2025 and included co-headlining appearances at Castle Party in Poland and Brainstorm Festival in the Netherlands, the band's first concert in Mexico, and its first South African shows in more than a decade.

== Critical reception ==
Professional ratings
Review scores
Source	Rating
Mauce	8/10
Myth of Rock	8.5/10

The album received generally positive reviews. Sean Bailey of Mauce rated it 8 out of 10, writing that it took several listens to reveal itself as a record built on atmosphere, mood and message, though he felt it rarely built to big climaxes. Myth of Rock gave it 8.5 out of 10 and called it possibly one of Nyte's finest works, singling out "Continuum". Christopher Nosnibor of Aural Aggravation praised it as a return to the beginning of the genre, highlighting "See You Fall" as a standout. Judy Lyon of Torched Magazine described it as both a homecoming and a rebirth for the band, and heard echoes of Peter Murphy on "Fallout".

Regen was more measured. Yücel called the album a statement of intent and an assertion of identity, but wrote that it offered few surprises for listeners already familiar with the band.

== Track listing ==
All tracks are written by Ashton Nyte.

No.	Title	Length
1.	"Shimmer"
2.	"Mirror Midnight"
3.	"Through the Veil"
4.	"Your Vampire"
5.	"Haunting"
6.	"Below the Emptiness"
7.	"See You Fall"
8.	"Fallout"
9.	"Sliver"
10.	"Not Here"
11.	"Cabaret"
12.	"Continuum"

== Personnel ==
- Ashton Nyte – vocals, all instruments, production, mixing, mastering

== Charts ==
Chart (2025)	Peak position
Germany (Deutsche Alternative Charts)	3
