= The Lost Theatre =

2026 studio album by The Awakening

Studio album by the Awakening
- Released: 23 August 2026
- Studios: Intervention Studios, United States
- Genres: Gothic rock; dark wave
- Label: Intervention Arts
- Producer: Ashton Nyte

The Awakening chronology
The Awakening (2024)	The Lost Theatre (2026)

Singles from The Lost Theatre
- 1. "Until The Dawn" Released: 23 July 2026

The Lost Theatre is the thirteenth studio album by the South African gothic rock band the Awakening, released on 23 August 2026 through Intervention Arts. Ashton Nyte wrote all of the music and lyrics, performed everything on the album and produced it at Intervention Studios in the United States.

Preceded by the single "Until The Dawn", the album reached number 2 on Germany's Deutsche Alternative Charts, following the number 3 peak of its self-titled predecessor. It was supported by the Lost Theatre Tour of Germany in September 2026.

== Background and recording ==
The album followed The Awakening (2024) and the Haunting Tour of 2025, which took the band across Europe, North America, Mexico and South Africa. Nyte described "Until The Dawn" as the song from which the rest of the album grew. As on the band's earlier records, he wrote and performed the album alone, and produced it at his own Intervention Studios.

The album was announced in June 2026, when pre-orders opened in standard, signed and limited deluxe editions.

== Music and lyrics ==
Writing for Jammerzine, Ryan Martin described The Lost Theatre as cinematic and theatrical, blending gothic rock, darkwave and electronic textures, and heard it as a record about the places people disappear into and what they find of themselves there. He felt its darkness was balanced by warmth, memory and hope, and that the album opened new ground rather than revisiting the band's past. Sean Bailey of Mauce heard a progression through brokenness and healing towards hope, and compared Nyte's baritone to that of David Bowie.

Nyte described "Until The Dawn" as a song about the courage to ask for help, and as a song of hope. Bailey contrasted driving gothic rock songs such as "Severed" and "Burning Room" with quieter pieces: "Crystal Morning" built around acoustic guitar, and "Isobel", a sparse song without drums or bass set against dissonant electronics. He described "Voices" as the album's emotional climax and the closing track, "This Dance", as rising like a sunrise after a long night.

== Release and promotion ==
"Until The Dawn" was released as the lead single with a music video on 23 July 2026. The album followed on 23 August 2026 on CD, clear vinyl and digital formats.

The Lost Theatre Tour began in Germany in September 2026, with a solo performance by Nyte at the Pauluskirche in Dortmund followed by full-band shows in Cologne, Hamburg and Berlin and an appearance at NCN Festival. Nyte also played solo dates in Switzerland and France.

== Critical reception ==
Professional ratings
Review scores
Source	Rating
Mauce	9/10

Mauce rated the album 9 out of 10. Bailey found it as dark as its predecessor but more hopeful, praised the way the instrumentation supported rather than overpowered Nyte's voice, and wrote that the album had no filler. In Jammerzine, Martin praised its sense of artistic freedom and its restraint, writing that it felt lived in rather than manufactured.

== Track listing ==
All tracks are written by Ashton Nyte.

No.	Title	Length
1.	"Berlin"
2.	"Until The Dawn"
3.	"Crystal Morning"
4.	"Severed"
5.	"Isobel"
6.	"Across Every Ocean"
7.	"Burning Room"
8.	"Behind The Curtain"
9.	"Drown"
10.	"Voices"
11.	"This Dance"

== Personnel ==
- Ashton Nyte – vocals, all instruments, production, mixing, mastering

== Charts ==
Chart (2026)	Peak position
Germany (Deutsche Alternative Charts)	2
