= Waiting for a Voice =

2020 studio album by Ashton Nyte

Studio album by Ashton Nyte
- Released: 20 July 2020
- Genres: Folk; Acoustic
- Length: 41:38
- Label: Intervention Arts
- Producer: Ashton Nyte

Ashton Nyte chronology
Some Kind of Satellite (2015)	Waiting for a Voice (2020)	Autumn's Children (2023)

Waiting for a Voice is a studio album by South African singer-songwriter Ashton Nyte, released on 20 July 2020 through Intervention Arts. It was released together with Nyte's first book, also titled Waiting for a Voice, a collection of poetry, lyrics, short stories and personal reflections.

Written largely in the months after a 2019 acoustic tour of Europe, and completed after the death of Nyte's father, the album is a stripped-down, largely acoustic record of eleven original songs and a cover of David Bowie's ""Heroes"". Nyte wrote, performed and produced it alone. American Songwriter described it as his most exposed work, darker and more reflective than his electric recordings, and Reflections of Darkness gave it ten out of ten, calling it his most personal album to date.

== Background ==
In late 2019 Nyte toured Europe as the support act for Wayne Hussey of The Mission, playing stripped-down acoustic versions of songs from a largely electric catalogue that spanned about 25 years and nearly 20 albums. Back home in St. Louis he was drawn to that unadorned sound, and began revisiting older songs that suited it while new ones came quickly. "Once I had written the title track," he said, "the floodgates opened, and everything came out." Eight of the album's eleven original songs were written after the tour ended in October 2019. The other three, "I Asked for Nothing", "This Isolation" and "Disappear", had been written about a decade earlier but never released, and "This Isolation" had nearly appeared on Some Kind of Satellite (2015).

Nyte's father died unexpectedly in February 2020, while the album and book were in progress. Nyte said the loss was one reason he chose to release the album that year rather than wait, and that although he hesitated to announce new work during the COVID-19 pandemic, he concluded that "we always need art".

== Recording ==
Nyte wrote, performed and produced the album himself. He usually writes on guitar, and "Awake" was the only song he composed on piano. He avoided programmed sounds and sample libraries, saying "I wanted all of it to be mine", and even the gramophone crackle that opens "Soon It Will Be Morning" was part of that approach. He described the aim as "telling a story and capturing an atmosphere, or emotion and painting pictures" rather than writing hooks.

== Music and lyrics ==
Tina Benitez-Eves of American Songwriter described the album as traversing "childhood inspirations, a spiritual and mystical connection to nature", and wrote that it dealt with growth, self-discovery, loss and grief. The arrangements centre on Nyte's baritone and acoustic guitar, with strings on "Dark Star", piano on "Awake" and fuller, more theatrical instrumentation on "Has Anybody Seen My Love". Benitez-Eves heard "Dark Star", a tribute to Bowie sung in a childlike voice, as a nocturnal folk tale with a nursery-rhyme feel, and "Disappear" as gypsy folk.

"I Asked for Nothing", one of his father's favourite songs, was performed at his father's memorial, and Nyte dedicated the album's cover of "Heroes" to him. The cover had originally been recorded as a gift for fans who pre-ordered the album, but was added to the track listing after a positive response. Nyte called the album and book "words of hope", and said fans had written to him about their own struggles in response.

== Book ==
The 134-page book was published by Intervention Arts in hardcover and paperback alongside the album, and was Nyte's first book. Nyte said the idea for it came from both him and his wife, Rose Mortem, and that he wanted it to "stand on its own as a piece of written work". It collects the album's lyrics with poetry, short stories and reflections, among them a tale called "Ghostboy", an homage to New Orleans and a note on his ambition to play Frank-N-Furter in The Rocky Horror Picture Show. It closes with "My Father's Hands", a poem written as a letter to his father. Jammerzine called it "a brilliant and compassionate collage of lyrics, poetry, and autobiographical segments".

== Release ==
Waiting for a Voice was released on 20 July 2020 on CD, vinyl and digital download. Nyte directed and edited a video for the title track, filmed in St. Louis.

== Critical reception ==
Professional ratings
Review scores
Source	Rating
Reflections of Darkness	10/10

Eva Lhum of Reflections of Darkness gave the album full marks, calling it "unusually touching and emotionally intense" and Nyte's most personal album to date. She praised its focus on voice and sparse instrumentation, named "Awake" and "Icicles" among its highlights, and recommended listening "in a low-lit room, with decent headphones". In American Songwriter, Benitez-Eves described the album as Nyte's most exposed work, with a folk-influenced sound darker and more reflective than his electric recordings. Jammerzine called it his "most personal songwriting to date".

== Track listing ==
All tracks are written by Ashton Nyte, with the exception of ""Heroes"", which was written by David Bowie and Brian Eno.

No.	Title	Length
1.	"Waiting for a Voice"	2:41
2.	"Ocean Song"	3:48
3.	"This Isolation"	3:38
4.	"Has Anybody Seen My Love"	3:14
5.	"Dark Star"	3:08
6.	"I Asked for Nothing"	3:00
7.	"Time (Just Before the Light Got In)"	3:28
8.	"Disappear"	3:25
9.	"Soon It Will Be Morning"	4:15
10.	""Heroes""	3:57
11.	"Awake"	3:32
12.	"Icicles"	3:32
Total length:		41:38

== Personnel ==
- Ashton Nyte – vocals, all instruments, production
