= Risen (The Awakening album) =

1997 studio album by The Awakening

Studio album by The Awakening
- Released: April 1997
- Studio: Mega Music Recording Studio
- Genre: Gothic rock
- Length: 48:27
- Labels: Tic Tic Bang; Intervention Arts (1999 reissue)
- Producers: Ashton Nyte; Leon Erasmus

The Awakening chronology
Risen (1997)	Request (1998)

Singles from Risen
- 1. "The Sounds of Silence"

Risen is the debut studio album by the South African gothic rock band The Awakening, first released in April 1997 by Tic Tic Bang and reissued by Nyte's own label, Intervention Arts, in 1999, remastered and with two bonus tracks. It includes the band's cover of Simon & Garfunkel's "The Sound of Silence", which went to number one in South Africa.

== Background and recording ==
Ashton Nyte made Risen while studying and working part-time. "I recorded 'Risen' as I could afford it", he recalled in 2026, "working part time, studying, funding the record myself." He recorded it at Mega Music Recording Studio, co-producing and engineering the album with Leon Erasmus, who also played keyboards on four tracks.

Nyte wrote the album, sang and played most of the instruments, with contributions from bassist Jenni Hazell, who co-wrote the music of "Turn Away" and "Sacrificial", guitarist Philip Booyens, Erasmus and backing vocalist Cheryl Staples. He had initially resisted recording "The Sound of Silence", which his father had urged him to try: "I can't do covers, I have to be original." Near the end of the sessions, Erasmus offered him the keys to the studio in return for looking after the house for a weekend, and Nyte recorded the song then, "almost as an afterthought".

== Release ==
Risen was first released by Tic Tic Bang in April 1997. In 1999 Intervention Arts reissued it, remastered by Graham Handley at Sweet 16 Studio and with two bonus tracks produced at Nyte's own NytesounD studio: an acoustic version of "Standing" and "No Reason". The reissue was also sold in the United States, where some copies carried an "American re-release" sticker. The South African radio DJ Barney Simon chose "The Sound of Silence" as the single, and the cover went to number one in South Africa. Nyte played his first show as The Awakening to about 400 people before the song had been released. LEO Weekly later wrote that the band's "fame spread thanks to" the cover. In 2015 Channel24 wrote that The Awakening had "enjoyed a dedicated following in South Africa since the release of Risen in 1997, featuring their rendition of The Sound Of Silence, now a cult classic", and in 2019 The Big Takeover recalled the song as the band's "stunning hit".

The cover charted again in late 2002 on the SA Rock Digest songs chart, peaking at number four, and Nyte later re-recorded it for the compilations Sacrificial Etchings (2002) and Anthology XV (2013).

== Critical reception ==
Reviewing the 1999 reissue for the British magazine Cross Rhythms, Alex Figgis placed The Awakening in the line of 1980s gothic acts such as The The, The Sisters of Mercy, The Mission and The Cure, noting that the band held "perhaps more firmly than others to their '80s heritage". Describing the album as "awash with keyboards, sampling and macabre guitar and vocals", he wrote that Nyte "emerges as something of a musical genius", having composed, arranged, produced and performed nearly all of it himself. He found the overall sound "rather dated", but concluded that Risen was "a good introduction to some excellent musical ideas from an artist bent on originality".

== Track listing ==
No.	Title	Writer(s)	Length
1.	"Nightfall"	Ashton Nyte	0:34
2.	"Past Idol"	Nyte	4:00
3.	"Change"	Nyte	4:05
4.	"Focus"	Nyte	3:30
5.	"The Sounds of Silence"	Paul Simon	3:53
6.	"Difference"	Nyte	4:28
7.	"Intervention"	Nyte	3:55
8.	"Holocaust"	Nyte	5:09
9.	"Standing"	Nyte	4:14
10.	"Turn Away"	Nyte, Jenni Hazell	3:20
11.	"Jezzebel"	Nyte	4:30
12.	"Sacrificial"	Nyte, Hazell	4:33
13.	"Child of the Moon"	Nyte	2:16
Total length:			48:27

1999 reissue bonus tracks
No.	Title	Writer(s)	Length
14.	"Standing" (acoustic version)	Nyte	3:42
15.	"No Reason"	Nyte	4:21

== Personnel ==
- Ashton Nyte – vocals, instruments, production, engineering
- Jenni Hazell – bass guitar (tracks 1–4, 6, 8–12)
- Philip Booyens – guitar solo (track 3), lead guitar (track 12)
- Leon Erasmus – keyboards (tracks 3, 4, 7, 9), production, engineering
- Graham Handley – remastering (1999 reissue)
- Cheryl Staples – backing vocals (tracks 9, 11)
