= The Slender Nudes =

2000 studio album by Ashton Nyte

Studio album by Ashton Nyte
- Released: 22 May 2000
- Genres: Glam rock; Synth-pop
- Length: 46:40
- Label: Intervention Arts
- Producer: Ashton Nyte

Ashton Nyte chronology
The Slender Nudes (2000)	Dirt Sense (2002)

Singles from The Slender Nudes
- 1. "Glam Vamp Baby"; 2. "Need for Air"; 3. "Hunting"

The Slender Nudes is the first solo studio album by the South African musician Ashton Nyte, frontman of the gothic rock band The Awakening, released on 22 May 2000 through Intervention Arts. A deliberate departure from the band, it set glam rock in the style of T. Rex and David Bowie's Ziggy Stardust period against 1980s synth-pop, and was built around a cast of characters including the Glam Vamp and the Electric Man. It appeared on the first album chart published by the SA Rock Digest, and was ranked 14th among the South African albums of 2000 by the Digest, which also placed its song "Hunting" ninth among the year's top 50 songs.

== Background ==
Nyte made The Slender Nudes as a break from The Awakening, whose albums he also wrote and largely performed alone. He composed, arranged and performed all of the music on the album himself. He later described it as "a Ziggy meets Rocky Horror glam thing" that "terrified a lot of Awakening fans". Where The Awakening was a "dark-rock-goth-orientated outfit", he said, his solo work had "no stylistic or genre allegiance", and on this album it "dabbled with glam rock and new romantic".

The album was partly a reply to listeners who saw him as "a one dimensional artist obsessed with a 'gothic/sinister' facade". In a 2002 interview Nyte explained that its imagery was "intentionally theatrical in an intentionally very non-goth way", and that the album was "loaded with characters like The Glam Vamp, The Naked Poet, The Electric Man".

== Artwork ==
The South African edition's cover shows Nyte kneeling beside a pale nude woman. Nyte said the model was "representative of an artwork to be appreciated in the bare essence of itself", which he described as one of the statements the album was making. Unlike The Awakening's albums, which were distributed in the United States through the Christian market, The Slender Nudes was not. Copies sold in the United States carried a different cover, showing Nyte as the Glam Vamp, the character he played in the "Glam Vamp Baby" video.

== Release ==
Intervention Arts released The Slender Nudes on 22 May 2000, with a launch party on 25 May. Announcing the album, the label presented it as a deliberately pop record, distinct from Nyte's gothic work, "treading the glitter-paved line between 70s Glam Rock and 80s Synth Pop". The first single, "Glam Vamp Baby", was already being played on national and campus radio. "Glam Vamp Baby", "Need for Air" and "Hunting" were issued as singles, and according to Nyte's website "Glam Vamp Baby" reached number 14 on 5FM's International Top 40. A music video was made for "Need for Air", and the CD carried the video for "Glam Vamp Baby" as a bonus.

== Chart performance ==
The SA Rock Digest did not publish an album chart until 13 August 2000, nearly three months after the album's release. The Slender Nudes appeared on that first chart at number 17.

== Critical reception ==
Reviewing the album in the Mail & Guardian in August 2000, Riaan Wolmarans called it "a very professional-sounding and -looking release, with the hopelessly talented Nyte composing, arranging and performing all the music". He praised the opening "glam-rocky Glam Vamp Baby, with Nyte's deep, dark voice gliding effortlessly over the guitar riffs", and wrote that "Need for Air" "must be one of the most beautiful ballads ever released in this country". He noted the album's themes, from androgyny on "Girlie" and "Electric Man" to appearances on "Fashion Forgot" and labelling on "Obscene", and its "good balance between the sleek, laid-back tracks and those one can move to", concluding: "Definitely one of the most interesting releases of the year."

In its review of 2000, the SA Rock Digest ranked The Slender Nudes 14th among the year's South African albums. Its writers noted that Nyte, stepping away from The Awakening, had "relaunched himself as a contemporary 'Glam Vamp Baby'" and released the album "to the expected mixed reactions", but judged that "'Nudes' proved Ashton can write and play a bit and these darkish, sinister songs throbbed, thrilled and rocked". They singled out "Hunting", "Glam Vamp Baby" and "Girlie", writing that Nyte "does his finest Iggy and the Sisters of Mercy impression on the menacing 'Hunting'". "Hunting" was ninth in the Digest's top 50 South African songs of 2000.

== Track listing ==
All tracks are written by Ashton Nyte.

No.	Title	Length
1.	"Glam Vamp Baby"	4:07
2.	"Selling Skin"	4:18
3.	"Obscene"	3:41
4.	"Need for Air"	4:50
5.	"Too Young"	3:15
6.	"Hunting"	4:15
7.	"Fashion Forgot"	5:00
8.	"Noisecolour"	4:03
9.	"Electric Man"	3:48
10.	"Lilly's World"	4:39
11.	"Girlie"	4:44
Total length:		46:40
