= Razor Burn =

2006 studio album by The Awakening

Studio album by The Awakening
- Released: 22 September 2006
- Studios: Intervention Studios; SonoVision Studios
- Genres: Gothic rock; Gothic metal
- Length: 49:05
- Labels: Massacre Records; Intervention Arts
- Producers: Ashton Nyte; Jon Buckley

The Awakening chronology
Darker Than Silence (2004)	Razor Burn (2006)	Tales of Absolution and Obsoletion (2009)

Razor Burn is a studio album by the South African gothic rock band The Awakening, released on 22 September 2006. It was released in Europe by the German label Massacre Records and in South Africa by Intervention Arts. The band has since used the title Razors Burn for the album and its title track.

Recorded with the band's full line-up and co-produced by Ashton Nyte and Jon Buckley, it pushed the band's sound towards gothic metal, with industrial touches. At the time Nyte called it "obviously our best album". Its release through Massacre Records brought the band to the European gothic and metal press: the Dutch site Metalfan.nl called it "without doubt their best work to date", and the Austrian Stormbringer described it as a thoroughly solid gothic album with "a few really beautiful songs".

== Background and recording ==
Razor Burn followed Darker Than Silence (2004), the year in which The Awakening also toured the United States. It was made with the band's line-up of guitarist Marcus van der Tuin, bassist Frankie Clark and drummer Herman Kruger. Nyte described it as "the album featuring the most actual band involvement", and as "the first album I've mixed and produced with someone else at a studio other than my own".

The album was recorded at Intervention Studios and SonoVision Studios in South Africa, with the drums engineered at Pyramid Rox Studios. Nyte, who wrote all of the music and lyrics, co-produced and mixed it with Jon Buckley, who also played additional guitar.

== Music ==
Metalfan.nl described the album as gothic rock and metal with a strong industrial influence, which it credited largely to Kruger's drumming, and compared the band to Lacrimas Profundere and HIM "minus the pop influences"; it likened Nyte's voice to that of Spider One of Powerman 5000. The reviewer singled out the opening track, "Arrow" and the guitar solo on "Oblivion", and noted that the album was not only melancholic, with atmospheric keyboards that never overwhelmed the songs.

The album is framed by "(Outside the Asylum)", a short opening piece, and "Asylum", its longest track. The title song is followed by a sequel, "Darkness Calls (Razor Burn Part 2)". Looking back in 2009, Nyte said that "'Razor Burn' was about as 'Rock' as I wanted to go".

== Release ==
Massacre Records released Razor Burn in Europe on 22 September 2006, with Intervention Arts handling the South African release. At the time the band was managed by the German company MCM Music. Shortly after the release Nyte said the band was finalising plans for European tours and festival appearances.

The title track was later re-recorded, as "Razors Burn", for the band's 2013 compilation Anthology XV.

== Critical reception ==
Edo of Metalfan.nl called Razor Burn "een mooie plaat" (a beautiful record) and "zondermeer hun beste werk tot op heden" (without doubt their best work to date), rating it 78 out of 100. His reservation was that the tension faded after the first five songs, and that the album became "steeds voorspelbaarder" (increasingly predictable) as it went on.

Stormbringer rated it three out of five, calling it "ein grundsolides Gothic-Album" (a thoroughly solid gothic album) of well-crafted, catchy gothic rock. The reviewer found the production "unterkühlt, fast schon zu sauber für Gothic" (cool, almost too clean for gothic), and felt that the polish left the listener without a point of connection to the music and lyrics, though the album contained "ein paar wirklich schöne Songs" (a few really beautiful songs) and gothic fans could still pick it up.

== Track listing ==
No.	Title	Writer(s)	Length
1.	"(Outside the Asylum)"	Ashton Nyte	1:37
2.	"Arrow"	Nyte	4:06
3.	"Heaven Waits"	Nyte	4:20
4.	"The Neon Sky"	Nyte	3:56
5.	"Razor Burn"	Nyte	4:37
6.	"Darkness Calls (Razor Burn Part 2)"	Nyte	3:28
7.	"Bleeding"	Nyte	4:13
8.	"Descent"	Nyte	4:08
9.	"Oblivion"	Nyte	4:55
10.	"Halo"	Nyte	4:04
11.	"Below"	Nyte	3:03
12.	"Asylum"	Nyte	6:38
Total length:			49:05

== Personnel ==
The Awakening

- Ashton Nyte – vocals, guitar, keyboards, production, mixing
- Marcus van der Tuin – guitars
- Frankie Clark – bass, backing vocals
- Herman Kruger – drums

Additional personnel

- Jon Buckley – additional guitars, production, mixing
- Garrick van der Tuin – drum engineering
