= Rose Mortem =

American fashion designer

- Known for: Gothic fashion
- Label: Rose Mortem
- Spouse: Ashton Nyte
- Website: rosemortem.com

Rose Mortem is an American fashion designer, musician, visual artist, model, and entrepreneur. Rose is most widely known for her dark romantic fashion stylings and as a member of the Gothic rock band The Awakening. She is a graduate of Harvard University.

Launching in 1998, the Rose Mortem fashion label was featured in several publications including Mick Mercer's cult classic, 21st Century Goth. Her work was frequently featured in goth subculture magazines including Gothic Beauty, Cynfeirdd, Terrorizer, and Fangoria. Rose also created fashions for independent films and theatre productions, and live performers of varying kinds including members of several bands, symphonies, operas and chamber music ensembles. Use of velvets, chiffons, satins, tulles and lace with sharply angled hemlines and layered skirting became the label's trademark style. As a musician, Rose is linked most notably with gothic rock band The Awakening of South Africa and has been married to the band's front man Ashton Nyte since 2009. In addition to live touring, she is credited with taking several of the band's album photographs and has filmed and appeared in many of their music videos.

According to interviews with Rose, her designs are inspired greatly by musicians, ranging widely in style, from David Bowie to Loretta Lynn. The designer also draws on her studies of Bohemianism, Dark Romanticism, and love for the literature, art and music of the Decadent movement. She credits her knowledge of fashion design entirely to her mother and grandmother's instruction, and to her "youthful passion for dissecting thrift store wedding gowns." Rose attributes her creativity to her eccentric upbringing by a non-nuclear family of various artists, and her long-time obsession with "making fashions that feel like music."

In 2009, Rose Mortem announced a partnership with South African record label Intervention Arts to distribute The Awakening's albums in the US. Shortly thereafter, Rose joined the band on piano and keyboards, and was featured in their 2009 release entitled Tales of Absolution and Obsoletion and the single Fault released on the band's 2014 Anthology XV compilation. Rose describes her latest fashion since joining The Awakening as "combining the elegance and extravagance of classic New Wave and Gothic fashion with touches of Bohemian elegance and Lolita chic — updated and reinvented for the modern world." In a 2015 Gothic Beauty magazine feature, the artist states her latest fashion stylings are directly inspired by her most recent music collaborations with rocker husband Ashton Nyte.

In 2019, Rose Mortem announced to fans that she was taking a hiatus from running her company; in 2021, she announced that after twenty years, she was stopping work in fashion to focus on music and health. She has since continued to appear in music videos and on tour with The Awakening in 2025 and 2026.

== See also ==
- Gothic fashion
- Gothic subculture
