= Tales of Absolution and Obsoletion =

2009 studio album by The Awakening

Studio album by The Awakening
- Released: August 2009
- Recorded: South Africa and United States
- Genres: Gothic rock; Darkwave
- Length: 42:47
- Label: Intervention Arts
- Producer: Ashton Nyte

The Awakening chronology
Razor Burn (2006)	Tales of Absolution and Obsoletion (2009)	Anthology XV (2013)

Tales of Absolution and Obsoletion (stylised as Tales of Absolution + Obsoletion) is the eighth studio album by the South African gothic rock band The Awakening, released through Intervention Arts in August 2009. Made after Ashton Nyte moved to the United States, it was recorded partly in South Africa and partly in the US. Nyte described it as a deliberate turn away from the heavier rock of Razor Burn (2006) towards "something that's more theatrical and romantic again", and as the most spiritually focused album the band had made in years.

== Background ==
After Razor Burn, which Nyte said was "about as 'Rock' as I wanted to go", he set out to make a record that "very clearly was not going to be mistaken for a Rock band", having become "disheartened by people thinking we were a Rock band with eyeliner". He called it "a conscious decision to reign in the aggression" of the previous album.

Nyte described Tales as "a transition album": half of the songs were written almost immediately after Razor Burn, and the other half in the months before he spoke about it in September 2009. Half of the album was recorded in South Africa, and he saw it as "an album to seal things up so we can move on" after his move to the United States.

== Music and lyrics ==
Nyte said he had been "comfortable in effectively making a nice, gloomy, Gothic record again", and that the album was "more cohesive in terms of its threads. The melancholy is quite present". Lyrically, he said, "there has been a spiritual rebirth in myself", and "the music is more spiritually charged now than it has been in a while."

Nyte wrote, performed and produced the entire album himself. The opening track, "Ivory", is in two parts. Three of the album's songs, "Indian Summer Rain", "Upon the Water" and "Nothing Like the Rain", were later reworked for the band's compilation Anthology XV (2013).

== Release and touring ==
Intervention Arts released Tales of Absolution and Obsoletion in August 2009. The band, by then based in the United States, toured extensively after its release, before beginning work on Anthology XV.

== Critical reception ==
Fangoria described the album as "a beautiful mix of ethereal dark romantic music to make angels and vampires alike weep for wanting". Gothtronic wrote that "this band fiddles your emotions", finding songs such as "Ivory" "breathtaking thanks to the classically theatrical romantics", and the music "atmospheric, not overly hard... without becoming a direct copy of any iconic goth band (although the Awakening could almost be called as such themselves)".

== Track listing ==
All tracks are written by Ashton Nyte.

No.	Title	Length
1.	"Ivory (Part 1 + 2)"	6:17
2.	"Indian Summer Rain"	4:29
3.	"Upon the Water"	4:24
4.	"A Carnival of Souls"	3:59
5.	"Frozen"	4:52
6.	"Nothing Like the Rain"	4:08
7.	"Where the Shadow Goes"	4:01
8.	"Open"	4:02
9.	"Prayer for the Song"	3:06
10.	"Alone"	3:29
Total length:		42:47

== Personnel ==
- Ashton Nyte – all vocals, instruments and production
- Rose Mortem – cover photography
