= Darker Than Silence =

2004 studio album by The Awakening

Studio album by The Awakening
- Released: June 2004
- Studios: Intervention Studios, Johannesburg
- Genres: Gothic rock; Industrial rock
- Length: 60:46
- Labels: Intervention Arts; Sonorium
- Producer: Ashton Nyte

The Awakening chronology
| Roadside Heretics (2002) | Darker Than Silence (2004) | Razor Burn (2006) |

Darker Than Silence is the sixth studio album by the South African gothic rock band The Awakening, released in June 2004 by Intervention Arts in South Africa and by Sonorium in Germany. Ashton Nyte wrote and produced the album. Reviewers called it the band's strongest album yet: iafrica.com described it as "easily the most fully realised album from The Awakening", and SA Rock as "their best album to date". The same year the band made its first tour of the United States.

== Background ==
Darker Than Silence followed Roadside Heretics (2002) and the compilation Sacrificial Etchings. Looking back in 2009, Nyte said that Roadside Heretics had been his "first experimentation with a harder sound and more, kind of, direct form of songwriting", and that he "tried variations of that in 'Darker Than Silence'" before pushing the band's rock side further on Razor Burn (2006).

== Music ==
Nyte again wrote, produced and performed almost all of the album himself. Nils van der Linden of iafrica.com summed up its sound as "riffing guitars, metronomic synth drums, industrial rhythms, alternately eerie and delicate keyboards, and that enthralling guttural voice", with songs ranging from "dark, aggressive all-out behemoths" such as "Armageddon Style" to "fragile, haunting ballads" such as "Page 3". SA Rock called it "The Awakening's heaviest album to date", its guitars, synth drums and vocals "more aggressive, giving the album a more industrial than gothic edge. Think Marilyn Manson with a guy who can actually sing." Both SA Rock and Absolute Tabs noted the religious content of the lyrics, the latter describing The Awakening as "a band with a spiritual message in their songs".

== Release ==
Intervention Arts released Darker Than Silence in South Africa in June 2004, and the German label Sonorium issued it in Germany the same year. In 2004 The Awakening also made its first tour of the United States.

== Critical reception ==
Darker Than Silence was well received in South Africa. Van der Linden, writing in July 2004, found that "despite such similarities with their past work", it was "easily the most fully realised album from The Awakening", with Nyte "still finding new ways to expand the goth brand with which they've been labeled". He wrote that Nyte "hasn't lost his ability to write melodies that are both beautiful and instantly memorable", pointing to "the delicate keyboard parts beneath the wall of guitars on 'Angelyn'", which he called "easily the band's most spellbinding love song since 'Maree'", and singled out the instrumental "Deprivation (Part 1)" as "a transfixing, rather than incidental, interlude".

SA Rock called it "their best album to date", adding that "The Awakening just keep getting better with each release" and that there were "hardly any fillers present". Its verdict: "Two thumbs up."

Odey Dorfling of Absolute Tabs wrote that "This album simply blew me away! Not only is it beautifully presented, superbly produced and laid out, but it also got rid of some of the stigmas surrounding South African music as a whole." He heard echoes of Sisters of Mercy, Rammstein and Type O Negative, and praised the album's "originality", though he would have liked the CD booklet to say more about the band. He called it "Most definitely a go-getter!"

== Track listing ==
All tracks are written by Ashton Nyte.

| No. | Title | Length |
|---|---|---|
| 1. | "Death Says Yes" | 5:23 |
| 2. | "One More Crucifixion" | 3:33 |
| 3. | "The Needle and the Gun" | 3:41 |
| 4. | "Frozen Icon" | 4:43 |
| 5. | "Gospel Song" | 3:24 |
| 6. | "The Man Who Wasn't There" | 3:25 |
| 7. | "Angelyn" | 4:45 |
| 8. | "Armageddon Style" | 3:27 |
| 9. | "Deprivation (Part 1)" | 2:31 |
| 10. | "Self" | 5:02 |
| 11. | "The Chosen" | 3:15 |
| 12. | "Animal" | 4:37 |
| 13. | "Page 3" | 2:19 |
| 14. | "Faith Falling?" | 4:13 |
| 15. | "Traffic" | 6:28 |
| Total length: | | 60:46 |

== Personnel ==
- Ashton Nyte – songwriting, production, package design
- Roger Machin – photography
