= This Alchemy =

2021 studio album by The Awakening

Studio album by The Awakening
- Released: 28 May 2021
- Genres: Darkwave; Gothic rock
- Label: Intervention Arts
- Producer: Ashton Nyte

The Awakening chronology
Chasm (2018)	This Alchemy (2021)	The Passage Remains (2022)

Singles from This Alchemy
- 1. "Zero Down" Released: 26 May 2021

This Alchemy is the tenth studio album by the South African gothic rock band The Awakening, released on 28 May 2021 through Intervention Arts. Written and recorded by Ashton Nyte during the COVID-19 pandemic, it is a colder, more outward-looking record than his preceding solo work, set in what he described as the underbelly of a dystopian city.

The album was well received. Regen praised its execution and Nyte's baritone, writing that it had no bad tracks, and Reflections of Darkness rated it 7 out of 10 before one of its writers named it the electronic gothic album of 2021.

== Background and recording ==
This Alchemy followed Chasm (2018) and Nyte's 2020 solo album and book of poetry and short stories, Waiting for a Voice. With touring halted by the pandemic, Nyte began by going through archived songs, story fragments and unused compositions from his 25-year career. Some of this material was first gathered as B-sides and songs for a side project, work that also produced the band's cover of Alice Cooper's "Clones (We're All)".

Nyte said he wanted the album to be the opposite of the intimate, personal Waiting for a Voice. Because live performance was not a consideration, he could write without thinking about how the songs would be played on stage. He called the record a new creative chapter for the band.

== Music and lyrics ==
Nyte described the album as exploring transformation, creation and the relationship between people and the world around them. Its lyrics look outward and adopt characters rather than dwelling on personal introspection, and he intended it as an immersive world rather than a collection of songs.

Regen's Ilker Yücel heard 1980s new wave influences on "When the Fear Subsides" and "A Victory of Love", an orchestral synthesiser hook on "Into the Machine", whose second half he likened to Nine Inch Nails, and acoustic and piano arrangements on "Take Me Home", "Winter's Unknown" and "Zero Down". He compared the band's style to Peter Murphy, Clan of Xymox and The Sisters of Mercy. "Zero Down" criticises the way the media, the music industry and fans exploit musicians after their deaths.

The album includes a cover of Alphaville's "A Victory of Love".

== Release ==
"Zero Down" was released with a video directed by Nyte on 26 May 2021, two days before the album. This Alchemy was released on 28 May 2021 on CD and digitally through Intervention Arts.

== Critical reception ==
Professional ratings
Review scores
Source	Rating
Reflections of Darkness	7/10

This Alchemy received generally positive reviews. Yücel of Regen found it confidently executed, praising Nyte's deep baritone and the emotional lift of his higher register on "All Tomorrow's Saints", and wrote that the album had no bad tracks. He noted that it stayed within the conventions of goth rather than trying to reinvent them. Stephen Kennedy of Reflections of Darkness rated it 7 out of 10, singling out the atmosphere and guitar work of "Empty Garden" and the vocal range of "Take Me Home" as highlights and praising the album's melodies, though he found some tracks less successful than others.

In January 2022, Reflections of Darkness writer Count_Death placed This Alchemy first in his list of the top ten electronic gothic albums of 2021.

== Track listing ==
No.	Title	Writer(s)	Length
1.	"Bitter Bliss"	Ashton Nyte
2.	"Into the Machine (Part 1 + 2)"	Nyte
3.	"Zero Down"	Nyte
4.	"Shadow Call"	Nyte
5.	"Winter's Unknown"	Nyte
6.	"When the Fear Subsides"	Nyte
7.	"A Victory of Love" (Alphaville cover)	Marian Gold, Bernhard Lloyd, Frank Mertens
8.	"Take Me Home"	Nyte
9.	"Empty Garden"	Nyte
10.	"All Tomorrow's Saints"	Nyte
11.	"This Alchemy"	Nyte

== Personnel ==
- Ashton Nyte – vocals, all instruments, production, mixing, mastering
