= Ashton Nyte =

South African singer, songwriter and producer

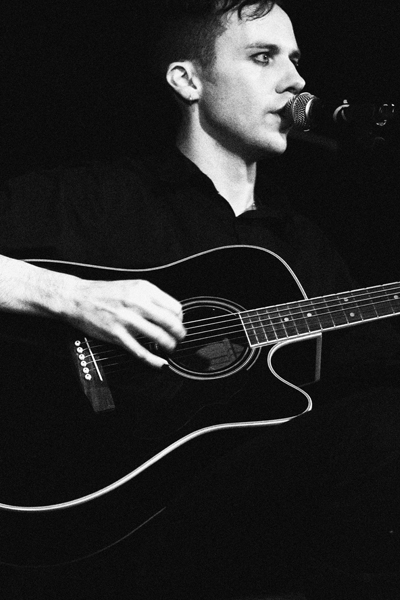
- Nyte performing live

Background information
- Born: Port Elizabeth, South Africa
- Origin: Johannesburg, South Africa
- Genres: Alternative rock; Gothic rock; Folk; Americana
- Occupations: Singer; songwriter; multi-instrumentalist; record producer; author
- Instruments: Vocals; guitar; keyboards; bass; drums
- Years active: 1995–present
- Label: Intervention Arts
- Website: ashtonnyte.com

Ashton Nyte is a South African singer, songwriter, multi-instrumentalist, producer and author, and the founder and frontman of the gothic rock band The Awakening. Since forming the band in Johannesburg in 1995, he has been a central figure in South African alternative rock, topping the country's rock charts and headlining its major festivals, and the band's work has been described as shaping the trajectory of South Africa's gothic and darkwave scenes. His baritone voice and theatrical range have earned him the nickname "Johannesburg's Bowie".

Nyte writes, performs and produces The Awakening's recordings, and has released thirteen albums with the band. Alongside them he has released nine solo albums, ranging from the glam rock of The Slender Nudes (2000) and the Americana of The Valley (2009) to the Afrikaans-language Moederland (2014), the post-punk of Some Kind of Satellite (2015) and the largely acoustic Waiting for a Voice (2020) and Autumn's Children (2023), each of the last two released with a book of his poetry and prose. American Songwriter named Autumn's Children one of the best albums of 2023. His lyrics deal with love and loss, isolation, mental health, spirituality and hope.

Nyte has toured extensively as a solo artist and with The Awakening across Europe, North America and South Africa, and has also written and starred in theatre productions. In South Africa he founded the Rock Against Rape concert series, and in the United States he has given a lecture series at universities on tolerance and acceptance. He has been based in the United States since 2008.

== Early life ==
Nyte was born in Port Elizabeth and spent his formative years in Johannesburg, growing up in what he has called "a household of music lovers" and listening to Elvis Presley and Johnny Cash. He has said that seeing a rerun of Presley's '68 Comeback Special at the age of five was his introduction to music, and that he discovered David Bowie at about eight on hearing "Space Oddity".

Nyte grew up in Johannesburg under apartheid. He has said that art was discouraged at his school, and that the separatism enforced on him "ended up being a huge catalyst" for pursuing an artistic path. Afrikaans was his second language, and he was writing poems in it by the age of seven or eight, drawing on South African authors and poets who, he said, "shone a light on alternative ways of thinking about the country". As a teenager he adopted the look of Bowie's Ziggy Stardust, and later moved into the gothic style he saw as "a natural evolution" from glam rock.

He began his career as the singer of the Johannesburg band Martyr's Image, before leaving in 1995 to form The Awakening. He recorded the band's debut album, Risen (1997), while studying and working part-time, funding the recording himself.

== Career ==
=== The Awakening and early solo albums (1995–2008) ===
With The Awakening, Nyte became one of the leading figures in South African alternative music. The band's cover of Simon & Garfunkel's "The Sound of Silence" went to number one in South Africa, and the band went on to headline the country's major festivals, including Oppikoppi and RAMfest. Nyte writes, performs and produces the band's recordings. In 1999 he founded the label Intervention Arts, which released The Awakening's and his own records as well as those of other South African artists, including Not My Dog, Fuzigish, Matthew van der Want, Four Ounce Freedom, Silex and The Narrow, and distributed local and international labels such as SPV, Cleopatra, TVT, EFA and Metropolis in South Africa. In 2003 he opened the Red Room, an alternative club in Honeydew, outside Johannesburg, which he intended as "a positive environment and a completely non-genre specific venue".

His first solo album, The Slender Nudes (2000), was a deliberate departure from the band, which Nyte described as "a Ziggy meets Rocky Horror glam thing" that "terrified a lot of Awakening fans". It appeared at number 17 on the SA Rock Digest's first album chart, in August 2000, and ranked 14th among South Africa's top 30 albums of 2000; its song "Hunting" was ninth among the year's top 50 songs. His second, Dirt Sense (2002), spent 17 weeks on the South African album charts, peaking at number two. Its song "Stained" reached number one on the South African songs chart in July 2002 and ranked 19th among the top 50 South African songs of that year. A Rock.co.za reviewer called it "a powerful album with strong tunes and hard-hitting lyrics", noting Stephen Segerman's description of Nyte as the "chameleon of SA rock" and his range of influences, from Lou Reed and Bowie to Tom Waits. It was followed by Sinister Swing (2003) and Headspace (2005), the latter released as Ashton Nyte and the Accused. During this period Nyte also wrote and starred in theatre productions; in 2002 he performed in My Bloody Valentine at the National Arts Festival in Grahamstown and at the University of Pretoria's Krekvars Arts Festival.

=== Move to the United States and The Valley (2008–2014) ===
Nyte recorded his fifth solo album, The Valley, in Johannesburg shortly before moving to the United States in 2008. He called it the most American album he had made, his own version of "an Americana/alt-country/lo-fi type of experience", while LEO Weekly described it as "more Man in Black than Ziggy". Released in the United States in June 2010, it received a five-star review from Addicted to Media, which likened its reflective journey to U2's The Joshua Tree. Nyte supported the release with his first solo tour of the United States in June and July 2010, from New York to New Orleans, and the St. Paul Pioneer Press wrote that the album had "earned raves for its unique take on Americana themes". Public Radio International's The World featured Nyte as a figure at the centre of South Africa's alternative rock scene.

His sixth solo album, Moederland, released in April 2014, was his first in Afrikaans, with twelve original songs. Its singles included "Kan Ons Weer Begin", "Geheime en Momente" and "Lukas", a duet with the Afrikaans singer Karin Hougaard. Netwerk24 named the album one of the ten best Afrikaans albums of 2014. Nyte joined Hougaard on stage to perform "Lukas" at her concert at the Atterbury Theatre in Pretoria in March 2014.

=== Some Kind of Satellite and collaborations (2015–2019) ===
Some Kind of Satellite (2015), his seventh solo album, marked Nyte's return to English-language songwriting and, in his own description, to his "post-punk theatrical roots". Texx and the City found its lyrics "poetic and intensely emotional" and called Nyte "South Africa's musical chameleon". The video for its first single, "Dressing Like You", premiered in Auxiliary magazine. In 2017 he released a cover of "The Crying Game" with a music video.

In 2016 Nyte appeared as a guest on Volumes, the debut album of MGT, the project of Mark Gemini Thwaite, guitarist with The Mission and Peter Murphy's band. Nyte co-wrote and sang "The Reaping" and "Jesamine", and MGT then became a duo of Thwaite and Nyte, releasing Gemini Nyte on Cleopatra Records in 2018. The same year he began contributing to Michael Ciravolo's collective Beauty in Chaos, whose contributors have included members of The Cure, Cheap Trick, Ministry and The Mission; Nyte co-wrote and sang songs on its second album, The Storm Before the Calm, including "The Outside".

In 2016 The Awakening supported The Mission on its 30th anniversary European tour. Nyte worked with composer Ethan Gold on the score for the film Don't Let Go, which premiered at the 2019 Sundance Film Festival under the title Relive. Later in 2019 he performed solo as the support act on 30 mainland European dates of Wayne Hussey's Salad Daze tour, between September and October.

Nyte's music has also been used on television, in The Purge and Pretty Little Liars: Original Sin, and in Pearry Teo's 2024 film Pale Horse.

=== Waiting for a Voice and Autumn's Children (2020–2023) ===
In July 2020 Nyte released his eighth solo album, Waiting for a Voice, together with his first book of poetry, short stories and personal reflections. A stripped-down, largely acoustic record that includes a cover of Bowie's ""Heroes"", it received a ten out of ten review from Reflections of Darkness, which called it "a magical piece of art". Writing in American Songwriter, Tina Benitez-Eves described it as traversing "childhood inspirations, a spiritual and mystical connection to nature"; Nyte called the album and book "words of hope".

His ninth solo album, Autumn's Children, followed on 25 August 2023, again with a companion book. Nyte said the new work had "a fragile vulnerability to it which I've never fully revealed before". He described its single "Cinnamon" as "an ode to hope in the face of adversity", written while "navigating various shades of depression and self-doubt". Reviewing the album for Louder Than War, Julianne Regan called it "an album of veil'd Melancholy, with a capital 'M'", and Nyte "a singer's singer ... with a warm, velvety baritone". American Songwriter included it in its top 17 albums of 2023.

=== Return to The Awakening and touring (2024–present) ===
In September 2024 Nyte began his first tour since the COVID-19 pandemic, a solo acoustic tour of Germany, the United Kingdom, Belgium and the Netherlands. At the tour's show at the Pauluskirche in Dortmund that October, he was joined on stage by Eric Clayton of Saviour Machine. In September he sang lead vocals on a cover of the Thompson Twins' "Doctor! Doctor!", with harmony vocals by Regan, on George Allen's collection The Complete Le Cygne Noir, and sang "Made of Rain", his fifth song with Beauty in Chaos, on its album Dancing with Angels. Onyx Music Reviews praised his "superb voice with an extraordinary range" on the song.

The Awakening's self-titled twelfth album, released in October 2024, reached number 3 on Germany's Deutsche Alternative Charts, and the band toured Europe, North America, Mexico and South Africa in 2025. In 2025 Nyte also contributed lyrics to IX, the debut album by the South African band Blvd Hvnny, and sang on its track "She's One of Us Now". The Awakening's thirteenth album, The Lost Theatre (2026), reached number 2 on the Deutsche Alternative Charts, and was followed by a German tour and solo dates by Nyte in Switzerland and France.

== Artistry ==
Nyte sings in a deep baritone, and his voice and theatrical range have drawn comparisons with Bowie and Johnny Cash. On most of his recordings he performs all of the instruments himself. He has named Presley and Bowie as his earliest influences, and Bauhaus and The Sisters of Mercy as the inspiration for The Awakening. His solo work has moved between glam rock, Americana, post-punk, folk and acoustic music, while The Awakening's has centred on gothic rock and darkwave.

Nyte has described songwriting as his way of making sense of his place in the world, of relationships and society, and of God and the universe. His lyrics deal with love and loss, isolation, mental health, spirituality and hope. He has spoken openly about depression in connection with "Cinnamon" and The Awakening's "Shadow Call", and has described spirituality as fundamental to him as a person and an artist. Reviewers have noted the religious imagery in his lyrics since the early 2000s, when HM wrote of their "Christcentric foundation".

== Activism ==
In 2001 Nyte founded Rock Against Rape, a series of three benefit concerts staged by Intervention Arts in response to South Africa's having the highest reported rate of rape in the world. The first two, held in Pretoria in 2001 and 2002, were timed for the week before the city's student RAG week to reach young rock audiences, and raised money for People Opposed to Woman Abuse (POWA) and the counselling organisation Inter-Trauma Nexus; the first drew 1,096 people and raised R20,000. In the United States he has given a lecture series at universities on tolerance and acceptance.

== Personal life ==
Nyte married the fashion designer and artist Rose Mortem in 2009. She played keyboards with The Awakening on its 2009 United States tour. He lives in St. Louis, Missouri.

== Discography ==
=== Solo studio albums ===
- The Slender Nudes (2000)
- Dirt Sense (2002)
- Sinister Swing (2003)
- Headspace (2005, as Ashton Nyte and the Accused)
- The Valley (2009; United States release 2010)
- Moederland (2014)
- Some Kind of Satellite (2015)
- Waiting for a Voice (2020)
- Autumn's Children (2023)

=== With The Awakening ===
- Risen (1997)
- Request (1998)
- Ethereal Menace (1999)
- The Fourth Seal of Zeen (2000)
- Roadside Heretics (2002)
- Darker Than Silence (2004)
- Razor Burn (2006)
- Tales of Absolution and Obsoletion (2009)
- Chasm (2018)
- This Alchemy (2021)
- The Passage Remains (2022)
- The Awakening (2024)
- The Lost Theatre (2026)

=== With MGT ===
- Gemini Nyte (2018)
