= The Awakening (band) =

South African alternative rock band

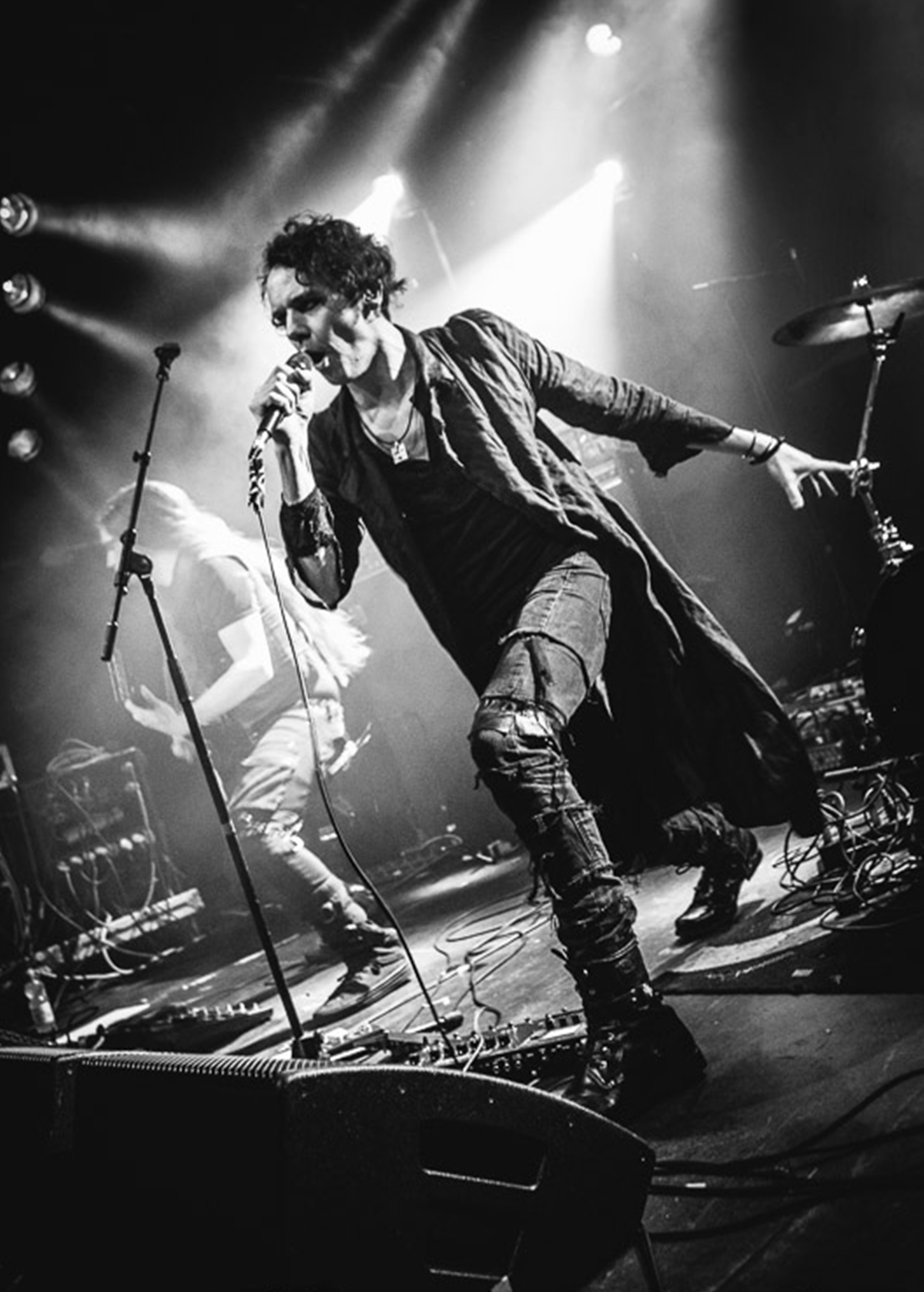
- The Awakening performing in 2016

Background information
- Origin: Johannesburg, South Africa
- Genres: Alternative rock; Gothic rock; Darkwave; Post-punk
- Years active: 1995–present
- Labels: Intervention Arts; Massacre Records
- Members: Ashton Nyte
- Website: theawakening.com

The Awakening is a South African alternative rock band formed in Johannesburg in 1995 by singer, songwriter, multi-instrumentalist and producer Ashton Nyte. Rooted in gothic rock and darkwave, the band has been credited with introducing gothic rock to South African audiences. Nyte has been the band's sole permanent member since its formation. He writes, performs and produces its recordings, and assembles a live band to perform with him when touring.

The band's debut album, Risen (1997), included a cover of Simon & Garfunkel's "The Sound of Silence" that went to number one in South Africa. It was followed by Request (1998), Ethereal Menace (1999), The Fourth Seal of Zeen (2000), Roadside Heretics (2002) and Darker Than Silence (2004). These produced further hits, including the number-one singles "Maree" and "The Maker", while the band headlined South African festivals including Oppikoppi and RAMfest. After its first United States tour in 2004, the band released Razor Burn (2006) in Europe through Massacre Records, and Nyte relocated to the United States in 2008.

Since the move, the band has released Tales of Absolution and Obsoletion (2009), Chasm (2018), This Alchemy (2021), The Passage Remains (2022), The Awakening (2024) and The Lost Theatre (2026). Both The Awakening and The Lost Theatre reached the top three of Germany's Deutsche Alternative Charts, the latter peaking at number 2. The band supported The Mission on its 30th anniversary European tour in 2016. Its 2025 Haunting Tour included co-headlining slots at Castle Party and Brainstorm Festival, its first concert in Mexico, and a return to South Africa for the first time in more than a decade to headline Praise the LOUD Fest.

== History ==
=== Formation and South African success (1995–2003) ===
Nyte began his career as the singer of the Johannesburg band Martyr's Image. He and the band's bassist, Jenny Hazell, shared an interest in Bauhaus and The Sisters of Mercy that the rest of the band did not. In 1995 Nyte left to start The Awakening, initially working with Hazell and a drum machine. The band's first show drew around 400 people.

The debut album, Risen (1997), included a cover of "The Sound of Silence" that was championed by South African radio DJ Barney Simon. It went to number one in South Africa and became something of a cult classic. Request (1998) moved toward the electronic sound of the 1980s New Romantic movement, and its single "Maree" also went to number one. Both albums were reissued with bonus tracks in March 1999. The band's dark image and sound drew both attention and controversy in South Africa. During this period Nyte also set up his own studio and record label, Intervention Arts, which has released the band's albums since.

In its second year the band headlined the second stage of South Africa's largest festival, and the main stage the following year. It went on to headline Oppikoppi and RAMfest. In July 1998 the band also launched The Shadow Theatre, a recurring club night it hosted that combined its live performances with art, theatre and fashion. The SA Rock Digest described it as a "union of art, music, theatre, fashion and dark-culture related activity that has been emulated by many"; by 2002 it was being held in both Pretoria and Cape Town.

Ethereal Menace (1999) added industrial elements, a sound Nyte described as "dark future rock". The band released two EPs the same year, The March and Sentimental Runaways. After his first solo album, The Slender Nudes, Nyte returned with The Fourth Seal of Zeen (2000). Its song "The Dark Romantics" became a staple of goth club playlists and remains the band's most-streamed track. The song was later featured in the 2022 HBO Max series Pretty Little Liars: Original Sin. The EP The Fountain followed at the end of 2001, five new songs and two reworkings that the SA Rock Digest's Stephen Segerman said showed "Ashton Nyte's versatility as a songwriter". It spent nine weeks on the South African rock album chart, peaking at number 4, and its single "Martyr" reached number 5; the SA Rock Digest later ranked "Martyr" among the top 50 South African songs of 2002. Reviewing the EP, Brian Currin recalled first hearing "Martyr" on Barney Simon's 5FM show and taking it for a new David Bowie song, before deciding it was "Bowie but better".

By Nyte's account, Roadside Heretics (2002) was his first experiment with a harder, more direct sound. Released in South Africa in October 2002, it spent eleven weeks on the South African rock album chart, peaking at number 2, and its single "The Maker" spent two weeks at number one. The SA Rock Digest placed the album 22nd among the South African albums of 2002, hearing Bowie, Lou Reed and Iggy Pop "jostling for pole position with Goth gods Sisters of Mercy, Bauhaus and The Mission" alongside "the nu-metal feel of Rammstein and Linkin Park", and concluding that "this album will melt your heart and your speakers".

Sacrificial Etchings, released in Europe in October 2002 and in South Africa in February 2003, was a 15-track retrospective of the band's work from 1996 to 2002. Rather than a straightforward best-of, it gathered new versions, remixes and remasters of earlier songs, including a heavier new recording of "The Sound of Silence", together with the previously unreleased "Vampyre Girl". It also reached number 2, as did "Vampyre Girl", and was among the top 20 South African rock albums of 2003. Between them, the band's releases spent a combined 35 weeks on the SA Rock Digest album chart between 2002 and 2003.

=== International releases and move to the United States (2004–2013) ===
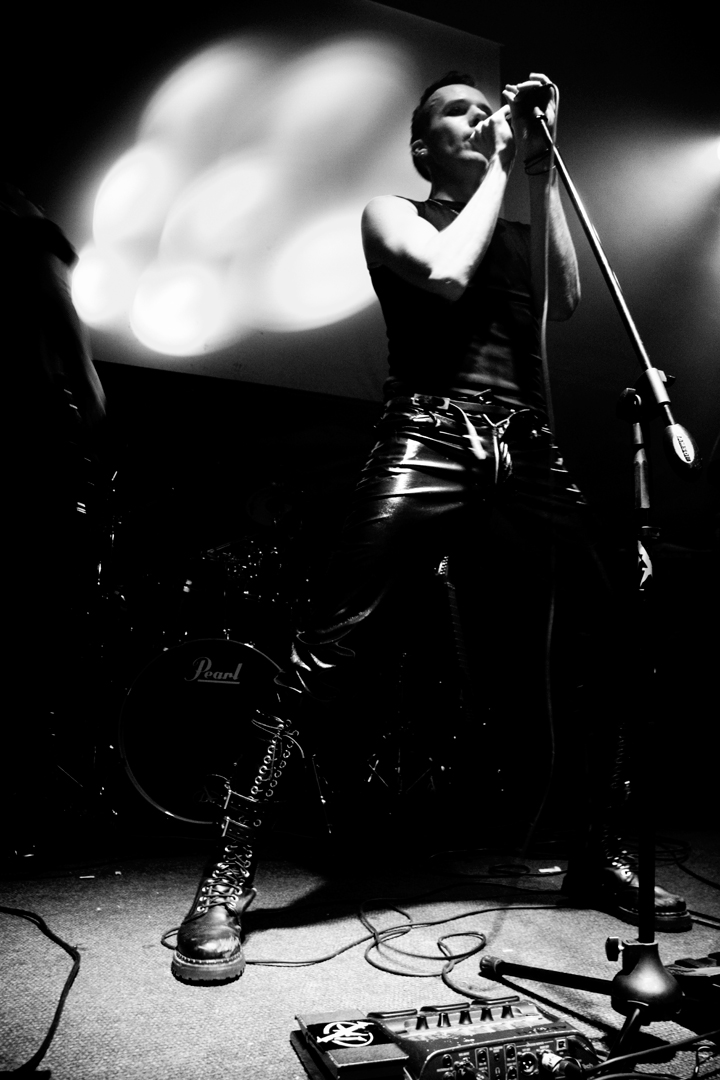
The Awakening performing live

iafrica.com rated Darker Than Silence (2004) four out of five and called it the band's most fully realised album. The same year, the band made its first tour of the United States. The German label Massacre Records released Razor Burn in Europe on 22 September 2006, and the album was reviewed in the European metal and gothic press. Nyte later described it as about as "rock" as he wanted the band to go.

Nyte relocated to the United States in 2008, marrying American artist and fashion designer Rose Mortem in 2009. Tales of Absolution and Obsoletion (2009) was a deliberate return to the more theatrical and romantic style of the Fourth Seal of Zeen era.The band then went on an extended hiatus while Nyte concentrated on his solo work. It returned with Anthology XV (2013), which collected re-recorded and remixed versions of earlier songs alongside two new tracks.

=== Return, Chasm and This Alchemy (2015–2023) ===
In October 2015 the band released the single "The Carriage". The following year it supported The Mission on 17 dates of its 30th anniversary European tour, and in 2019 Nyte opened for Wayne Hussey on more than 30 dates across mainland Europe.

Chasm, the band's first studio album since 2009, was released on 26 November 2018. This Alchemy followed in May 2021. Regen described it as a confident mix of darkwave and classic gothic rock in the tradition of Clan of Xymox and The Sisters of Mercy. The Passage Remains was released in 2022.

=== The Awakening and the Haunting Tour (2024–2025) ===
The self-titled twelfth album was released on 18 October 2024, preceded by the single "Mirror Midnight". Regen described it as a return to the band's roots after the heavier and more electronic sound of the two previous albums. The album was featured in the November 2024 issue of Sonic Seducer, whose cover CD included "Mirror Midnight". It was also covered by Orkus and American Songwriter. Critics compared it to early Sisters of Mercy, The Mission and Bauhaus, and Regen called it a statement of intent and an assertion of identity, while noting that it offered few surprises for listeners already familiar with the band. The album entered the Deutsche Alternative Charts at number 3. The singles "Haunting" and "Through the Veil" followed in 2025, along with the Through the Veil EP in April.

The Haunting Tour of 2025, the band's first full tour in nine years, took it across Europe, to North America and back to South Africa. Along the way it co-headlined Castle Party in Poland and Brainstorm Festival in the Netherlands, and played its first concert in Mexico. The tour ended with the band's first South African shows in more than a decade, headlining Praise the LOUD Fest in Johannesburg and Stellenbosch.

=== The Lost Theatre (2026–present) ===
The thirteenth studio album, The Lost Theatre, was announced in June 2026. Its lead single, "Until The Dawn", was released with a video on 23 July 2026. The album followed on 23 August 2026 and reached number 2 on the Deutsche Alternative Charts.

Mauce rated the album 9 out of 10, finding it as dark as its predecessor but more hopeful in tone. Jammerzine wrote that it did not attempt to recreate an earlier version of the band and showed a strong sense of artistic freedom. The album was followed in September 2026 by a tour of Germany, including NCN Festival, and solo dates by Nyte in Switzerland and France. Nyte described the "lost theatre" of the title as a metaphor for art and the community that shares and celebrates it, something he felt was being lost amid the noise and distractions of modern life, and called the album "essentially a quest": for one's own truth, for direction and for help.

== Musical style and influences ==
The Awakening's sound has shifted across its catalogue. Risen leaned on guitar-driven gothic rock, Request drew on New Romantic electronics, and Ethereal Menace introduced the industrial-influenced "dark future rock" sound. Nyte has described Roadside Heretics through Razor Burn as a heavier, rock-oriented period, and Tales of Absolution and Obsoletion as a deliberate return to a more theatrical style. Reviewers of later albums have placed the band in the darkwave and traditional goth lineage, noting elements of post-punk, electronic rock and folk noir. They have compared it with The Sisters of Mercy, Bauhaus, The Mission and Clan of Xymox.

Nyte has said that a shared love of Bauhaus and The Sisters of Mercy led him to start the band, and has named Bauhaus's Shadow of Light concert video as an early inspiration. He has described The Mission as a significant influence on the band's beginnings and named David Bowie and Kate Bush as personal heroes. He also placed The Sisters of Mercy's "Marian" first on a list of his favourite gothic songs. Music journalists have called him "Johannesburg's Bowie" for his stylistic range and theatrical performance. Nyte has described the band's live shows as ritualistic and theatrical, built on "passion, beauty, poetry and theatrics". In 2026 the French magazine Regards protestants described the band's aesthetic as gothic, drawing on Bowie, Kate Bush, Ingmar Bergman and David Lynch, but carrying an openly spiritual thread of faith centred on compassion, inclusion and love.

== Lyrical themes ==
Nyte has described songwriting as his way of making sense of his place in the world, of relationships and society, and of God and the universe. Recurring subjects in his lyrics include love and loss, isolation, mental health, spirituality and hope.

Love and loss have been constants. Reviewers of the band's early albums noted sensuous love songs and "impassioned declarations of love", while later records turned increasingly to loss and isolation: the songs on Chasm (2018) deal with isolation, loss and the state of the world, and "Through the Veil", from The Awakening (2024), tells of someone who has died but wishes to stay near the person they love.

Spirituality runs through the band's catalogue. Reviewers in the 2000s noted the lyrics' "Christcentric foundation" and religious metaphors, and Absolute Tabs described The Awakening as "a band with a spiritual message in their songs". Nyte has described spirituality as fundamental to him as a person and an artist, and said that his lyrics on Tales of Absolution and Obsoletion (2009) reflected a spiritual rebirth. He has said that when the band began, listeners were surprised to find a spiritual current, "not so hidden", in its lyrics, citing "Sacrificial", from Risen, a song about the crucifixion. He has described his work not as dwelling in darkness but as exploring paths through it, and ways of celebrating the light that stands out all the more within it.

Nyte has also written openly about mental health. He has described working through personal demons in his lyrics, and released the video for "Shadow Call", from This Alchemy (2021), in solidarity with "all who suffer from depression and other forms of mental illness". His recent work leans towards hope: The Lost Theatre (2026) moves through brokenness and healing towards hope, and he described its lead single, "Until The Dawn", as a song about the courage to ask for help.

Some later songs also carry social commentary, including "Zero Down", about the posthumous exploitation of musicians by the media and the music industry, and "Mirror Midnight", about self-obsession fed by mass and social media.

== Members ==
Nyte is the sole permanent member of The Awakening and performs all instruments and vocals on its recordings unless otherwise credited. The live band has changed between tours. Touring musicians named in coverage include:

- bassist Jenny Hazell, in the band's early years
- keyboardist Rose Mortem, from 2009
- bassist Chela Rhea Harper (formerly of Coal Chamber), in 2015
- on the 2025 Haunting Tour, guitarist Jeremy Kohnmann of London After Midnight, bassists Diego "Ashes" Ibarra of Wednesday 13 (formerly of Static-X and DevilDriver) and Rob Dokter of Eric Clayton and the Nine and Saviour Machine, on different legs of the tour, and drummer Sevven

== Other projects ==
Nyte has released nine solo albums alongside his work with The Awakening, beginning with The Slender Nudes (2000). American Songwriter named his 2023 album Autumn's Children one of the best albums of that year.

Nyte co-wrote and sang two songs, "The Reaping" and "Jesamine", on Volumes (2016), the debut album of MGT, the solo project of former Mission guitarist Mark Gemini Thwaite. MGT then became a duo of Thwaite and Nyte. Their album Gemini Nyte, written and recorded by the pair with Killing Joke drummer Paul Ferguson and guests including Burton C. Bell of Fear Factory, was released by Cleopatra Records on 23 February 2018.

Since 2018 Nyte has been a regular contributor to Michael Ciravolo's collective Beauty In Chaos, singing on five of its songs by 2024, from "Storm" (2018) to "Made of Rain" from the album Dancing with Angels (2024). He also worked with composer Ethan Gold on the score for the film Don't Let Go, which premiered at the 2019 Sundance Film Festival under the title Relive.

== Discography ==
Studio albums

- Risen (1997)
- Request (1998)
- Ethereal Menace (1999)
- The Fourth Seal of Zeen (2000)
- Roadside Heretics (2002)
- Darker Than Silence (2004)
- Razor Burn (2006)
- Tales of Absolution and Obsoletion (2009)
- Chasm (2018)
- This Alchemy (2021)
- The Passage Remains (2022)
- The Awakening (2024)
- The Lost Theatre (2026)

EPs

- The March (1999)
- Sentimental Runaways (1999)
- The Fountain (2001)
- Through the Veil (2025)

Compilations

- Sacrificial Etchings (2003)
- Anthology XV (2013)
