= List of South African musicians =

This list of South African musicians includes notable individual musicians as well as musical ensembles whose members are South African by birth or nationality.

== A ==
- The African Renaissance Ensemble, Johannesburg-based early music ensemble
- Afrotraction (Mzwandile Moya; born 1983), R&B and neo-soul musician and producer
- AKA (1988–2023), hip-hop artist and record producer
- aKing, acoustic rock band
- Sizwe Alakine (born 1987), Amapiano musician (aka Reason, rapper)
- Amampondo, traditional Xhosa percussion group from Cape Town
- Anatii (born 1993), hip-hop artist and record producer
- A-Reece (born 1997), hip-hop artist and lyricist
- Leigh Ashton (born 1956), singer-songwriter from Johannesburg
- Assagai, Afro-rock band active in the early 1970s
- Robin Auld, singer songwriter
- The Awakening, gothic rock
- Aymos (born 1989), singer songwriter

== B ==
- Baby Queen, South African-born London-based alternative pop singer
- Julian Bahula (1938–2023), jazz drummer
- Ballyhoo, 1980s pop band best known for the hit "Man on the Moon"
- Zakes Bantwini
- Leonel Bastos (born 1956), Mozambiquan adult contemporary musician and producer working in South Africa
- Battery 9, industrial music project from Johannesburg
- Beatenberg
- Amanda Black (born 1993), Afro-soul singer-songwriter
- BlackByrd, pop trio
- BLK JKS, rock band
- Elvis Blue, musician and songwriter
- Bongo Maffin, kwaito music group
- Boo!, band
- Boom Shaka, kwaito music group
- Stef Bos (born 1961), singer
- Cristina Boshoff (born 1980), folk pop singer and pianist
- Brasse Vannie Kaap, hip-hop group
- Bles Bridges (1947–2000), singer
- Bright Blue, 1980s pop band, best known for the hit song "Weeping"
- The Brother Moves On, performance art ensemble
- Buckfever Underground, folk/punk/art band
- Bucie (born 1987), R&B and soul singer
- Bulletscript, metal band
- Busiswa (born 1988), house musician
- Jonathan Butler (born 1961), singer-songwriter and guitarist
- Guy Buttery (born 1983), guitar player

== C ==
- Adrienne Camp (born 1981), singer-songwriter
- Captain Stu, ska, funk, punk, and soul fusion band
- Arno Carstens (born 1972), former lead singer of Springbok Nude Girls
- Louise Carver (born 1979), folk rock singer-songwriter and pianist
- Cassette, rock band
- Cassper Nyovest (born 1990), rapper and record producer
- Tony Cedras (born 1952), musician
- Chad (born 1993), rapper
- Yvonne Chaka Chaka (born 1965), singer
- Chris Chameleon (born 1971), solo artist, lead singer and bass guitarist for Boo
- Blondie Chaplin (born 1951), singer and guitarist
- Jesse Clegg (born 1988)
- Johnny Clegg (1953–2019)
- Clout, 1970s rock group
- Basil Coetzee (1944–1998), saxophonist
- Mimi Coertse (born 1932), soprano singer
- Fifi Cooper (born 1991), singer
- Tony Cox (born 1954), guitarist
- Crashcarburn, rock band
- Civil Twilight, four-piece rock band
- Crow Black Sky, black metal band
- Costa Titch (1995–2023), Amapiano rapper and dancer
- Covenant Voices, mass gospel choir with elements of traditional Zulu music, jazz, R&B and contemporary music

== D ==
- Da L.E.S (born 1985), hip-hop artist
- Simphiwe Dana (born 1980)
- Danny K (Daniel Koppel), R&B singer-songwriter
- Kurt Darren (born 1970), singer
- Pierre de Charmoy (born 1961), singer-songwriter
- Steven De Groote (1953–1989), classical pianist and winner of the Van Cliburn International Piano Competition
- Fanie de Jager (born 1949), operatic tenor
- Die Antwoord, alternative hip hop group
- Die Heuwels Fantasties, Afrikaans rock band
- Bonginkosi Dlamini (born 1977), poet, actor and singer, also known as Zola
- Dollar Brand (1934–2026)
- Donald (born 1985), singer
- Dorp, rock band
- Downfall, ska and punk band
- Dr Victor and the Rasta Rebels, reggae
- Dreamteam, hip-hop group from Durban
- Jabulani Dubazana, singer, Ladysmith Black Mambazo
- Lucky Dube (1964–2007)
- Ampie du Preez, singer and guitarist
- Johnny Dyani (1945–1986), jazz double bassist
- DJ Speedsta, hip-hop DJ

== E ==
- Dennis East, singer
- Shane Eagle (born 1996), hip-hop artist
- Alton Edwards, singer
- Eden, pop band
- Elaine (born 1999), singer and songwriter
- Endorphine
- Emtee (born 1992), hip-hop artist
- Dawid Engela (1931–1967), composer and musicologist
- éVoid, 1980s new wave
- Erica Eloff, soprano

== F ==
- The Fake Leather Blues Band
- Falling Mirror, alternative rock band
- Brenda Fassie (1964–2004)
- Ricky Fataar (born 1952), drummer
- Duncan Faure, singer-songwriter formerly with the band Rabbitt
- Mongezi Feza (1945–1975), trumpet player and flautist
- Anton Fig (born 1952), drummer
- Josh Fix, singer-songwriter
- Fokofpolisiekar, Afrikaans rock band
- Foto na Dans, Afrikaans rock band
- Four Jacks and a Jill, folk rock ensemble
- Johnny Fourie (1937–2007), jazz guitarist
- Freshlyground, Afro-fusion band
- Fuzigish, ska punk band

== G ==
- Hotep Idris Galeta (born 1941), jazz pianist
- Goldfish, electronic duo
- Goodluck, electronic music band
- Anton Goosen (born 1946), singer
- Die Grafsteensangers, comical entertainment group

== H ==
- Half Price, punk rock band
- Paul Hanmer (born 1961), composer, pianist, and jazz musician
- The Helicopters, pop rock band active in the 1980s
- Ken E Henson (born 1947), musician
- Henry Ate, band
- Sonja Herholdt (born 1952), singer-songwriter
- Hog Hoggidy Hog, band
- Steve Hofmeyr (born 1964), singer and actor

== I ==
- Abdullah Ibrahim (1934–2026)
- Zaki Ibrahim, singer-songwriter
- iFANi (born 1985), hip-hop/rap artist,
- Isochronous, rock band

== J ==
- Jabu Khanyile (1957–2006)
- Robbie Jansen (1949–2010)
- Jeremy Loops (born 1986), modern folk, singer
- Theuns Jordaan (1971-2021), singer and songwriter
- Claire Johnston (born 1967), lead singer of Mango Groove
- Trevor Jones (born 1949), composer
- Armand Joubert (born 1995), singer-songwriter
- Joy, a vocal group
- John Edmond (born 1936), singer
- John Ireland (born 1954), singer and songwriter
- Juluka, band
- Just Jinjer (previously Just Jinger)
- JR, rapper
- Junkyard Lipstick, five-piece, female metal band
- L-Tido (born 1982), hip-hop artist, aka 16V

== K ==
- Kabelo Mabalane (born 1976), kwaito artist, former member of TKZee
- Kabza de small (born 1992), an amapiano producer and DJ
- Kalahari Surfers
- Kamo Mphela (born 1999), an amapiano musician and dancer
- K.Keed, hip-hop artist and rapper
- Wouter Kellerman (born 1961), flautist
- Johannes Kerkorrel (1960–2002)
- Sibongile Khumalo (1957–2021), singer
- Francois Klark, pop singer based in Canada
- KOBUS!, band
- Koos Kombuis (born 1954)
- John Kongos (born 1945)
- Kongos, band
- Gé Korsten (1927–1999)
- David Kramer (born 1951)
- Kwesta (born 1988), hip-hop artist and poet
- K.O, hip-hop artist and record producer
- Kyle Watson, record producer and DJ

== L ==
- Felix Laband, electronic musician
- Riku Lätti, songwriter, composer, music producer
- Ladysmith Black Mambazo (born 1960), isicathamiya group
- Don Laka, jazz musician, pianist, producer
- Robert Lange (born 1948), music producer
- Lark, band
- Jack Lerole (c. 1940–2003), tin whistle player; singer
- Solomon Linda (1909–1962), songwriter
- Lira (Lerato Moipone Molapo; born 1979), singer
- Locnville, electro hop music duo
- Steve Louw (born 1955), singer-songwriter
- Roger Lucey, singer and guitarist
- Lucky Dube, singer and keyboard player

== M ==
- Mark Haze, rock singer
- Sipho Mabuse (born 1951), singer
- Arthur Mafokate (born 1969), kwaito singer and composer
- Mahlathini and the Mahotella Queens, a mbaqanga band
- Vusi Mahlasela (born 1965)
- Patricia Majalisa (1967–2020), bubblegum artist
- Mandisi Dyantjis (born 1983), musician, composer, and trumpeter
- Makgona Tsohle Band (1964–1999), a mbaqanga instrumental band
- Bongi Makeba (1950–1985), singer-songwriter
- Miriam Makeba (1932–2008)
- Malaika (group)
- Petronel Malan (born 1974), concert pianist
- Man As Machine
- Mandoza (born 1978), kwaito singer
- Mango Groove
- Mildred Mangxola (born 1944), singer in Mahlathini and the Mahotella Queens and member of the Mahotella Queens
- Manfred Mann (born 194)
- MarcAlex, group known for the hit "Quick Quick"
- Josef Marais (1905–1978)
- Martin PK
- Hugh Masekela (1939–2018)
- Dorothy Masuka (1935–2026), jazz singer
- Neels Mattheus (1935–2003), traditional musician
- Dave Matthews (born 1967), lead singer and founding member of Dave Matthews Band
- Irene Mawela (born 1940), veteran singer and composer
- Illana May (born 1976)
- Abednego Mazibuko, singer with Ladysmith Black Mambazo
- Albert Mazibuko (born 1948), singer with Ladysmith Black Mambazo
- Thandiswa Mazwai (born 1976)
- Chris McGregor (1936–1990), jazz pianist and composer
- Busi Mhlongo (1947–2010), singer, dancer and composer
- Mind Assault
- Moreira Chonguica (born 1977), jazz saxophonist and producer
- Kippie Moeketsi (1925–1983), saxophonist
- Pops Mohamed (1949–2025), jazz musician
- Louis Moholo (1940–2025), drummer
- Matthew Mole (born 1991), singer-songwriter
- Moonchild Sanelly (Sanelisiwe Twisha, born 1987), musician and dancer
- Moozlie (born 1992), hip-hop artist and television presenter
- Lebo Morake (aka Lebo M) (born 1965)
- Shaun Morgan (born 1980), singer also known as Shaun Morgan Welgemoed
- Ike Moriz (born 1972), singer, composer and lyricist
- Jean Morrison, alternative rock singer-songwriter
- Mshengu White Mambazo (1976–2003), junior choir of Ladysmith Black Mambazo
- Mthunzi (born 1992), amapiano singer-songwriter
- Colbert Mukwevho (born 1965), reggae singer
- Russel Mthembu, singer with Ladysmith Black Mambazo
- Muzi (born 1991), electronic musician
- MVZZLE (born 1995), record producer
- Msaki (born 1988), singer-songwriter, composer

== N ==
- Nádine (born 1982), singer-songwriter
- The Narrow
- Nasty C (born 1997), hip-hop artist and record producer
- Bongani Ndodana-Breen, composer
- Jim Neversink, alternative country singer-songwriter and guitarist
- New Academics
- Steve Newman
- Bernoldus Niemand (1959–1995)
- Simon "Mahlathini" Nkabinde (1937–1999), Mbaqanga singer
- Nkosazana Daughter, an upcoming amapiano artist
- West Nkosi (1940–1998), mbaqanga musician
- No Friends of Harry
- Nobesuthu Mbadu (born 1945), singer in Mahlathini and the Mahotella Queens and member of the Mahotella Queens
- Siphiwo Ntshebe (1974–2010), operatic tenor from New Brighton, Port Elizabeth
- Ashton Nyte, solo artist as well as lead singer and producer of The Awakening
- Nadia Nakai (born 1990), hip-hop artist

== O ==
- Sarah Oates, violinist and associate leader Philharmonia orchestra
- Wendy Oldfield, rock singer-songwriter
- Oskido (born 1967), record producer and songwriter

== P ==
- Jack Parow (born 1982), hip-hop artist
- The Parlotones, indie rock band
- Al Paton, singer-songwriter, producer, and percussionist
- Orville Peck, country musician
- Petit Cheval, New Romantic rock group
- Ray Phiri (1947–2017), Jazz, jazz fusion, reggae and mbaqanga musician
- James Phillips, singer-songwriter also known as Bernoldus Niemand
- Anke Pietrangeli (born 1982), winner of the second series of Idols
- Dizu Plaatjies, founder and former lead singer of Amampondo
- PJ Powers (born 1960)
- Prime Circle, rock band
- Professor (born 1978), Kwaito musician
- Dudu Pukwana (1938–1990), saxophonist, pianist, and composer
- Purified, Christian hip-hop artist

== Q ==
- Qkumba Zoo

== R ==
- Rabbitt
- Trevor Rabin (born 1954), musician
- Dolly Rathebe (1928–2004)
- Laurika Rauch, Afrikaans singer
- Reason, rapper
- Surendran Reddy (1962–2010) pianist and composer
- Riddare av Koden
- Riky Rick (born 1987), hip-hop artist and record producer
- Rooibaardt, rock band
- Rouge (rapper)

== S ==
- Sandy B, house music singer
- Savuka, band
- Robert Schneider of The Apples in Stereo
- Leon Schuster (born 1951), singer
- Seether, formerly called Saron Gas, hard rock and alternative metal band
- Gerard Sekoto (1913–1993)
- Judith Sephuma (born 1974), jazz and Afro-pop singer
- Jockey Shabalala (1943–2006), singer with Ladysmith Black Mambazo
- Joseph Shabalala (born 1941), lead singer and founder of Ladysmith Black Mambazo
- Msizi Shabalala (born 1975), singer with Ladysmith Black Mambazo
- Sibongiseni Shabalala (born 1973), singer with Ladysmith Black Mambazo
- Troye Sivan (born 1995), South African-born
- Thamsanqa Shabalala (born 1977), singer with Ladysmith Black Mambazo
- Thulani Shabalala (born 1968), singer with Ladysmith Black Mambazo
- Shane Eagle (born 1996), hip-hop artist and lyricist
- Shiraz, band active 1984–1984
- Silver Creek Mountain Band, folk band
- Margaret Singana (1938–2000)
- Robert Sithole, pennywhistle player
- Skylight, pop rock band
- Kyla-Rose Smith (born 1982), violinist and dancer
- Enoch Sontonga, teacher, lay-preacher and composer who wrote "Nkosi Sikelel' iAfrika"
- South African National Youth Orchestra
- Springbok Nude Girls
- The Square Set
- Zanne Stapelberg (born 1977), opera soprano
- Dale Stewart (born 1979)
- Sterling EQ, Classical crossover group
- Stimela, Afro-fusion band formed in 1982
- Straatligkinders, Afrikaans rock band
- Sugardrive, rock group
- Okmalumkoolkat (born 1983), hip-hop artist
- Stogie T (born 1981), hip-hop artist
- Sun-El Musician (born 1989), DJ and music producer

== T ==
- Tananas
- Taxi Violence
- Peta Teanet, singer
- TKZee, kwaito group
- Hilda Tloubatla (born 1942), lead singer of Mahotella Queens, and singer in Mahlathini and the Mahotella Queens
- Tokollo Tshabalala, kwaito singer also known as Magesh
- Peter Toussaint, singer-songwriter and guitar player
- Toya Delazy, pop singer and pianist
- Tribe After Tribe, alternative rock band
- Tuks, hip-hop artist
- Tumi and the Volume, hip-hop music ensemble
- Tweak, alternative rock band
- Tyla, a South African pop artist

== U ==
- Uhuru, Kwaito and afropop music group
- Uncle Waffles, Swazi-born DJ and record producer
- Urban Creep, rock band

== V ==
- Bobby van Jaarsveld (born 1987), singer-songwriter and actor
- Bok van Blerk (born 1978)
- Van Coke Kartel, Afrikaans alternative rock band
- Amor Vittone (born 1972), singer

== W ==
- Watershed, pop rock band founded in 1998
- Shaun Welgemoed (born 1978)
- Heinz Winckler (born 1978), singer who won the first series of Idols
- Winston's Jive Mixup (1943–2009), tenor saxophone player
- Babes Wodumo (born 1994), gqom musician
- Wonderboom, rock band
- Markus Wormstorm (born 1981), electronic musician and composer

== Y ==
- Pretty Yende (born 1985), operatic soprano from Piet Retief, Mpumalanga
- Yorxe (born 1998), singer and songwriter
- YoungstaCPT (born 1991), rapper and songwriter

== Z ==
- Zahara (born 1987-2023), singer-songwriter and poet
- Zebra & Giraffe, alternative rock band
- Karen Zoid (born 1978)
- Zola (born 1977)
- Zonke (born 1979), singer-songwriter and record producer
- DJ Zinhle, DJ and producer

== See also ==
- List of Afrikaans singers
- Music of Namibia
- Music of the Netherlands
- Music of South Africa
