= Punk in Africa =

2012 African musical film

- Directed by: Deon Maas; Keith Jones
- Written by: Deon Maas; Keith Jones
- Produced by: Keith Jones; Jeffrey Brown
- Starring: Ivan Kadey; Paulo Chibanga; Lee Thomson; Warrick Sony
- Cinematography: Gary Keith Griffin
- Edited by: Andrew Wills
- Music by: Numerous
- Release date: 29 January 2012; (USA)
- Running time: 182 08 minutes
- Countries: South Africa; Czech Republic; Zimbabwe; Mozambique
- Languages: English; Portuguese

Punk in Africa, is a 2012 multilingual African documentary historical punk music film co-directed by Deon Maas and Keith Jones and co-produced by director himself with Jefe Brown. The film includes contributions from African punk musicians Ivan Kadey, Paulo Chibanga, Lee Thomson, and Warwick Sony. The film examines the multiracial African punk movement during various political and social upheavals through the lens of three Southern African countries: South Africa, Mozambique and Zimbabwe.

The film premiered on 29 January 2012 in the United States, receiving mixed reviews from critics, but being screened at many film festivals. The music featured in the documentary includes a number of Southern African musicians and bands including: Suck, Wild Youth, Safari Suits, Power Age, National Wake, KOOS, Kalahari Surfers, The Genuines, Hog Hoggidy Hog, Fuzigish, Sibling Rivalry, 340ml (Mozambique), Panzer, The Rudimentals (Zimbabwe), Evicted, Sticky Antlers, Freak, LYT, Jagwa Music, Fruits and Veggies, Swivel Foot.

In 2013, the DVD of the film was released as an international version without a regional code and with English, German, Spanish and Portuguese subtitles for the English-language audio version.

== Cast ==
- Paulo Chibanga
- Michael Fleck
- Ivan Kadey
- Ruben Rose
- Warrick Sony
- Lee Thomson
