= Hog Hoggidy Hog =

South African band

- Also known as: The Hogs, HHH
- Origin: Cape Town, South Africa
- Genres: Punk; Ska punk; Rock
- Years active: 1995–present
- Labels: Way Cool Records; Hogmosh Music; Bellville Records
- Members: Amos Keeto; Sean Snout; Lee Lips; Ross McDonald; Sean Devey
- Past members: George Bacon; Peter Porker; Robin Stehlik; David Mybergie; Mike Horne
- Website: hoghoggidyhog.co.za

Hog Hoggidy Hog was a band from Cape Town, South Africa. The band blended a mixture of punk, ska and many other influences, including traditional African music to create an original sound, sometimes referred to as Porkrock. The band was active within the South African music scene from 1995 to 2015. They toured the European circuit from 2005 until 2015. They were one of the longest standing live acts in South Africa and are often regarded as the best band that ever came out from South Africa for their intensely original music. They are credited as being the frontrunners and founders of the SA punk scene and are sometimes also referred to as the godfathers of punk in SA, regularly cited as being the first punks in SA to have mohawks and dreadlocks. They have also had a profound impact on South African alternative music influencing bands from The Rudimentals, Half Price to Fokofpolisiekar.

== History ==
=== Formation and early years (1995–97) ===
The original line-up of Hog Hoggidy Hog was George Bacon on vocals, Sean Snout on Bass, Peter Porker on Drums and Amos Keeto on guitar. Bacon and Snout both played in thrash/hardcore/ska/punk band, Leviathan (which eventually set the blueprint for much of what became the Hog Hoggidy Hog sound). Keeto played in surf/thrash band, Cerebral Frenzy and Porker was the drummer for death metal band, Decimated. Bacon, Keeto and Porker all attended the same college together. Keeto and Bacon had also known each other previously from the beach in the Cape Town surf scene and they all knew each other from the relatively small Cape Town underground music scene. So when all of their respective bands broke up around the same time, they decided to form Hog Hoggidy Hog. It wasn't always an obvious choice of band members. Apparently Poker wanted to, "...start a band that sings about death and Satan" and Skeeto wasn't really a big fan of ska or punk. The band admits to thinking that nothing serious would ever come of Hog Hoggidy Hog, but they went ahead and made it official on 24 June 1995. Because they all had quite different influences, the band didn't actually decide on a genre and their intention was to borrow from any and all genres and see what came of it. After only a few months together, the band played their first show at The Purple Turtle opening up for The Springbok Nude Girls. Right up until ten minutes before they went on stage, they were still undecided on a name for the band. Bacon and Skeeto wanted to call the band The Dingleberries, whereas Snout and Porker wanted to call it Hog Hoggidy Hog. Evidently it was Snout that made the final call, Bacon and Keeto weren't happy, but as they hardly expected the band to last, they didn't think too much of it. It is unclear exactly where the name Hog Hoggidy Hog originated. The band like to make fun of this question in interviews and generally give a different answer every time it's asked.

The sound of the band in the beginning was relatively eclectic, but it was already in this early stage that the Hogs experimented with traditional African sounds such as the Cape Goema inspired song, Nkosi Concertina. The band was well received from the beginning, but didn't really think that they were going anywhere and very nearly called it a day. It was around this time that Porker had negotiated a record deal with Way Cool Records. Way Cool was an independent label started by an old punk rocker turned advertising executive, Hennie La Grange. He started the label with the sole purpose of recording the Hogs, but later went on to sign, among others, Fungy gone West, Pothole and 7th Breed. Porker, however, left the band to emigrate to England shortly before the first album could be recorded. The Hogs got in old Leviathan drummer, Robin 'Porkchop' Stehlik to take over. At this stage the band was now 3 quarters of the old Leviathan members and while still keeping to the plan of borrowing from various genres, the Hogs started going more in the direction of punk and ska. The punk scene at the time was Hog Hoggidy Hog and a group of about 4 or 5 friends, but the band started holding 'punk nights' at Arties Underground, where the scene started to grow and eventually a few more bands appeared too such as Fungy gone West and Diminished Return (The original incarnation of 3 Chord Theory).

=== Fishpaste & Vibe and drug addiction (1997–99) ===
It was around this time that Hog Hoggidy Hog recorded the album, 'Fishpaste & Vibe'. The first single, 'The Popstar Explosion' was released as a cassette in 1996 and the original pressing was completely sold out on the first day of release. Popstar explosion was the first local punk song ever to be played on national radio and the popularity of the band and the scene as a whole increased even more. In late 1996 Hog Hoggidy Hog did their first tour to Johannesburg and released the 'Timebomb' EP cassette. Stehlik left the band at the end of 1996 before the full-length album was released and although he was only part of the writing process for two songs, his influence on the band stuck. David Myburgh (Later Miss David Mybergie) drummer for future label buddies, Pothole, filled in on drums 'temporarily' until the band could find a suitable replacement. 'Fishpaste & Vibe' was eventually released in 1997. This was the first SA punk album to be released on CD and the 2nd single, 'Jim' reached the top ten on the national rock charts. 'Fishpaste & Vibe' was a relative success and everything seemed to be going right for the band. However, by late 1997, although Myburgh was still filling in at shows, the band still hadn't found a permanent drummer. By 1998 the Hogs had lost the momentum from 'Fishpaste & Vibe'. They were in the writing process for the next album, but the newer material tended to be more experimental (sources say that this was mostly due to the band's excessive drug and alcohol abuse at the time) and most of it never ever made it out of the practice room. Bacon says of this time period, "I was fairly convinced that I would be dead by the age of 25". The band was eventually dropped from the label as well as kicked out of their practice studio. Myburgh was also fired from Pothole for his excessive substance abuse, but on the bright side this enabled him to become a permanent member of Hog Hoggidy Hog as Miss David Mybergie. In late 1998 Bacon and Keeto moved in together. It was at this point that the band started pulling themselves back together and a period of renewed inspiration followed and the band started focusing on the music once again. It was during this period that tracks such as Time 4 Love, Just a Lie and John & Philippp's song were written.

=== Porkrock sound, touring, and "Naked" (1999–2003) ===
1999 was seen as a turning point for the Hogs. It was the year that Lee Lips first joined the band and the first introduction of horns to the Porkrock sound. The Time 4 Love single was recorded for a music video shortly after Lips joined. The single was extremely well received and placed in the top 5 of the national rock charts. Their new national popularity lead to the band getting out of Cape Town more and their first solo tour to Gauteng. This was when Hogs first met up with the two other main pioneers of the SA scene, Leek & The Bouncing Uptones from Pretoria and Fuzigish from Joburg. In late 1999 the band was invited to play at their first major mainstream festival at the 3 Passes Festival in Wolseley, Western Cape. The Hogs were supposed to play at 18:00 on the Friday night, however, dummer Mybergie had got arrested on the way to the festival for possession of illegal substances. The band eventually managed to get him out, but only in time to play the 22:00 headline slot. Mybergie claimed at the time, "This shows you, crime does pay." In 2000 The band recorded the single Just a Lie for the Croakroom Records compilation. Croakroom was an independent label from Pretoria, owned and run by Andrew Wright (lead guitarist and vocalist for Leek and the Bouncing Uptones) and the compilation featured international bands such as Nofx, Millencolin and New Found Glory alongside South African bands such as Hog Hoggidy Hog, Fuzigish, Leek & the Bouncing Uptones, Pet Flyz (Pretoria), Humphrey the Teacup (Joburg), Crossingpoint (Durban) and The Vendetta Cartel (Joburg). A lot of the friendships and bonds made in these early days set the foundations for the infrastructure of the SA scene on a national level and paved the way for a touring circuit to be used much more frequently. In late 2000 the Hogs went into the studio to record a new album. By this stage the band already had a reputation as a formidable live act and apparently had wanted to recreate that on the album. Lips recalls, "We wanted to capture the live energy so we did everything exactly like we would have at a live show, right down to the two cases of beer and a bottle each of tequila and whiskey. Although it was a lot of fun, in the end it just sounded like a drunken mess."

During the recording of the album, Lips also announced that he would be emigrating to Scotland to follow the girl of his dreams. This was when the song, Bye Lips was written. A young 17-year-old Ross McDonald was brought in to replace Lips, but the band found that the trombone sound wasn't cutting through the punk rock quite like the trumpet did. This was when the band decided to get a two-piece horn section and played a few shows with Andrew Chicken of Fungy gone West, then Jody Engelbrecht of Rudimentals and finally Miles McDonald (McDonald's older brother) alongside McDonald. Meanwhile, in Scotland, Lips and his girlfriend broke up and he decided to return to Cape Town. This was just in time for the Hogs to release the album, Driving Over Miss Davie in 2001. Although the band claim that the album is "a drunken mess", it was still really well received with two of the singles reaching the top 5 of the national rock charts and most of the band's defining songs are said to have been on this album. Hog Hoggidy Hog also did their first nationwide SA tour and were by then well known throughout the country as one of the pioneers of the scene. The July 2001 edition of Cosmopolitan (magazine) SA featured a naked picture of the Hogs. Following which the band kept being asked to take their clothes off on stage. In late 2001 the Hogs played a small intimate show at the Bio Cafe at CityVarsity in Cape Town. The show was said to have been poorly organised and the sound for the opening bands was apparently very bad. It was at this point that the Hogs, evidently wanting to take the focus off the poor sound, decided to walk out onto stage completely naked. The band then encouraged the audience to get naked too, by the end of the set the entire venue was full of naked to semi-naked people. It is a little known fact that the Hog song, Naked was first performed on this night and because it didn't have a title at the time, they just ended up calling it the Naked song. The Hogs' penchant for excess and debauchery was renowned, but Mybergie's alcohol and Crack cocaine addictions started affecting the band a little too much. The band admits to having to secretly drug Mybergie with sleeping pills while on tour in order to keep him under control. Eventually Mybergie was replaced by Mike Horne in 2003. Snout recalls, "When Davie was still in the band it was probably the closest we ever were as a band. Having to fire him was one of the hardest decisions we've ever had to make, but it was obvious that we couldn't carry on the way things were going." With Horne now on Drums, the Hogs went into the studio again to record Naked (the song) with producer, Theo Crous. This was released on the Naked EP along with all the music videos off Driving Over Miss Davie and a couple of live tracks. The band was extremely happy with how the song turned out and continued to work with Crous for their next full-length album.

=== Oink! and European tour (2004–08) ===
The recording of the Oink! album was another turning point for the band. Although, the music itself hadn't changed much, finally having a professional recording saw the band being accepted a lot more into the mainstream. In an interview for MCA Bacon once said, "We never wanted it, we certainly didn't ask for it and you never really feel comfortable with it. I mean, we spent most of the last decade fighting against the mainstream and now all of a sudden that's supposed to be cool?" The song Great Escape was apparently written about the conflicts the band felt at this time. Oink! Became a quintessential album in, not just the SA punk scene, but for SA music as a whole with a generation of musicians and bands over wide range of differing backgrounds and genres siting this album as having influenced them in some way or another. However, the landscape of SA broadcasting had changed quite dramatically since the previous release so ironically, this was the first time Hog Hoggidy Hog released an album without any singles that would make the national radio charts. In response to the political changes in national broadcasting, the popularity of campus stations went through a boom phase and because songs from Hog Hoggidy Hog's Oink! were being played extensively on campus radios across the country, the band benefited from it too. In 2005 they toured Europe for the first time. The tour was documented on the, Hog Hoggidy Hog Tourope 2005 documentary released in 2006. It's in this documentary that George Bacon can be seen wearing a cast on his foot after breaking some bones kicking over a monitor in frustration at a poorly organised festival in Paarl, Western Cape. By this stage the band had played headlining slots at every major festival in the country. Earlier in 2005, Lee Thompson and Ross McDonald co-produced the debut album of another up and coming Cape Town ska band called Captain Stu. In 2007, they went back to Europe again. The tour must have been quite excessive because trombonist, Ross McDonald, upon landing at Cape Town airport, was taken directly to rehab for alcohol and substance abuse. South Africa had by then reached the radar of international acts wanting to tour somewhere slightly different. Hog Hoggidy Hog got to play with, and also, in conjunction with Punk Safari, helped to organize the SA shows for bands such as Lagwagon, Nofx, Mad Caddies, Frenzal Rhomb and more. The band then go to working on their next studio album. However, Mike Horne announced he would be leaving the band. Horne still continued on to recording on the album, but was in the meantime replaced by Sean DV. Lips recalls his first meeting DV, "We were at a festival and George pointed out the person he was considering to replace Mike on drums. I looked around and there was DV, lying facedown, passed out in the dirt. From that moment, I knew he was our man!". Whilst working on the new album, the band received some tragic news. On 1 December 2008, Ex-drummer and still close friend, Miss Davie Mybergie had died. He was apparently stabbed outside of a 7 Eleven in his home suburb of Southfield while buying cigarettes, but the rest of the details remain unclear. Although there were witnesses who identified the killer, he still remains at large. Although Mybergie hadn't been in the band for a few years, the band is said to have remained in contact with him and were deeply affected by his death. Singer George Bacon gave the eulogy at his funeral.

=== Method to the Madness, and recognition (2009–14) ===
The Hogs released the album Method to the Madness in 2009 and dedicated it to the memory of ex-drummer, Mybergie. The album saw the sound of the Hogs taking a much heavier and less commercial musical direction. Although the album was less 'radio friendly' than their previous offerings, various singles including Carry On, Out of Control and Sherry Anne did extremely well on the campus radio charts and received heavy rotation on campus and independent radio stations across the country. The album Method to the Madness was nominated for a SAMA (South African Music Awards) in 2010. In 2010 Hog Hoggidy Hog also released the music video for the single Sherry Anne. The video spent a number of weeks at number 1 on the popular MK (channel) music video charts in South Africa and was nominated for an MK Award also in 2010. The Sherry Anne video was also play-listed on MTV Brasil. In 2011 Method to the Madness was also released in Europe on an independent label, Southern Pulse. The Hogs followed this up with another European tour in 2011 hitting the festival circuit in Slovenia sharing the stage with bands like Nofx, Bad Religion, Strung Out, The Toasters, The Real McKenzies, The Bouncing Souls, Total Chaos, Talco and more. The Hogs toured Europe once again in 2012 and have had well-received shows in Germany, Austria, Slovenia, England, Switzerland, Czech Republic and Netherlands. According to the band's Facebook page, they are currently working on a new album and hope to support that up with a South African as well as a European tour.

=== Bacon's death and twentieth anniversary (2015–present) ===
Following the death of lead singer George Bacon in May 2015, the band's future is currently unclear. George Bacon was found dead in his car the morning after a Hogs reunion gig. The gig was the first show of a new South African tour

== Members ==
Present members

- Amos Keeto — guitar (1995–present)
- Sean Snout — bass guitar (1995–present)
- Lee Lips — trumpet (1999–present)
- Ross McDonald — trombone (1999–present)
- Sean Devey — drums (2008–present)

Past members

- Peter Porker — drums (1995–1996)
- Robin Stehlik — drums (1996–1997)
- Miss David Mybergie — drums (1997–2003)
- Mike Horne — drums (2003–2008)
- George Bacon — vocals (1995–2015)

== Discography ==
=== Studio albums ===
- Fishpaste & Vibe (1997)
- Driving Over Miss Davie (2001)
- Oink! (2005)
- Method to the Madness (2009)

=== Extended plays ===
- The Popstar Explosion (1996)
- Timebomb (1996)
- The Happy Medium (2000)
- Naked (2003)

=== Videography ===
- "Hogmosh" (1996)
- "Time 4 Love" on YouTube (1999)
- "Crack Whore" on YouTube (2001)
- "John & Phillip's Song" on YouTube (2001)
- "Just a Lie" (2001)
- Tourope 2005 (2006)
- "Sherry Anne" on YouTube (2009)
