= Mandisi Dyantyis =

South African musician, composer, and trumpeter

Mandisi Dyantyis (born 1983) is a South African musician, composer, and trumpeter known for his fusion of jazz, gospel, and African traditional music. He has gained recognition for his powerful storytelling through music, his emotive performances, and his ability to blend different musical styles seamlessly.

== Early life and education ==
Dyantyis was born in 1983 in Gqeberha (formerly Port Elizabeth), South Africa. He developed an interest in music at a young age, particularly influenced by gospel and jazz traditions. Dyantyis later pursued formal music training at the University of Cape Town, where he honed his skills as a trumpeter, vocalist, and composer.

== Musical career ==
Dyantyis has carved out a niche in the South African music scene with his unique blend of jazz, gospel, and indigenous African sounds. He is known for his deep, resonant voice and his ability to convey powerful emotions through his compositions. His music often explores themes of love, struggle, heritage, and spirituality.

In 2018, he released his critically acclaimed debut album, Somandla, which showcased his ability to merge storytelling with rich musical arrangements. The album received widespread praise and established him as a leading figure in contemporary South African jazz. His subsequent work continued to receive acclaim, earning him a growing international audience.

The third album by Dyantyis, Intlambululo: Ukuhlambulula, was released in late 2025. It explores themes of renewal and rebirth through music. The album won Best Jazz at the 32nd ceremony of the South African Music Awards .

== Discography ==
- Somandla (2018)
- Cwaka (2021)
- Intlambululo: Ukuhlambulula (2025)

== Achievements ==
=== South African Music Awards ===
| Year | Nominee / work | Award | Result | Ref. |
|---|---|---|---|---|
| 2026 | Intlambululo: Ukuhlambulula | Best Jazz Album | Won | |

== See also ==
- Hugh Masekela
- Abdullah Ibrahim
- List of South African musicians
