= Dreams Never Die (Dreamteam album) =

Studio album by Dreamteam
- Released: July 31, 2015
- Recorded: 2013–2015
- Genre: Hip hop; rap; kwaito; house
- Length: 81:46
- Language: English; isiZulu
- Label: DreamTeam Music Group; Afrotainment
- Producer: Trevor Sineke; Anatii; Gemini Major; Tellaman; Lastee; Abdus; Tweezy

Singles from Dreams Never Die
- 1. "Phambili" Released: May 26, 2014; 2. "What's Your Name" Released: February 14, 2015; 3. "iNgoma" Released: October 24, 2015; 4. "Shandis" Released: October 16, 2015

Dreams Never Die is the debut studio album by South African hip hop recording trio Dreamteam. The album was released on July 31, 2015.

== Track listing ==
| No. | Title | Writer(s) | Producer(s) | Length |
|---|---|---|---|---|
| 1. | "Intro" | Trevor Sineke*Mpilo Shabangu | | 01:34 |
| 2. | "Dreams Never Die" | Thelumusa Samuel Owen*Thulasizwe Dlamini*Trevor Sineke*Mthokozisi Mkhathini*Lusaso Ngcobo | Lastee & Tellaman | 04:32 |
| 3. | "Uzokwenzani" | Trevor Sineke*Mpilo Shabangu*Mthokozisi Mkhathini*Lusaso Ngcobo | | 04:50 |
| 4. | "S'hamba Kanje" | Tumelo "Tweezy" Mathebula*Trevor Sineke*Mthokozisi Mkhathini*Lusaso Ngcobo | Tweezy | 04:20 |
| 5. | "iNgoma" | Gemini*Trevor Sineke*Mthokozisi Mkhathini*Lusaso Ngcobo | Gemini Major | 04:30 |
| 6. | "Trey" (Interlude) | Trevor Sineke*Mpilo Shabangu | Trey | 03:42 |
| 7. | "Phambili" (featuring Ihhashi Elimhlophe) | Wandile Ngidi*Muzi Mazibuko*Trevor Sineke*Mthokozisi Mkhathini*Lusaso Ngcobo*Bheki Ngcobo | | 04:01 |
| 8. | "Svunguvungu" (featuring Abdus) | Trevor Sineke*Mthokozisi Mkhathini*Lusaso Ngcobo*Ndlela Biyase | Abdus | 04:56 |
| 9. | "iMuncu" | Trevor Sineke*Mthokozisi Mkhathini*Lusaso Ngcobo | | 04:30 |
| 10. | "Shandis" (featuring Anatii) | Anathi Mnyango*Trevor Sineke*Mthokozisi Mkhathini*Lusaso Ngcobo | Anatii | 04:38 |
| 11. | "Talk That Shit" (featuring Ice Prince and AKA) | Tumelo Mathebula*Trevor Sineke*Mthokozisi Mkhathini*Lusaso Ngcobo*Kiernan Forbes*Panshak Zamani | Tweezy | 04:42 |
| 12. | "Dash" (Interlude) | Trevor Sineke*Mpilo Shabangu*Mthokozisi Mkhathini | Trey | 03:57 |
| 13. | "Get Up" (featuring Monaco) | Bongani Nyembe*Siphesihle Mngengwe*Trevor Sineke*Mthokozisi Mkhathini*Lusaso Ngcobo | | 04:26 |
| 14. | "What's Your Name" (featuring NaakMusiQ and Donald) | Claude Ndlovu*Mpilo Shabangu*Tumelo Mathebula*Anga Makubalo*Donald Moatshe*Trevor Sineke*Mthokozisi Mkhathini*Lusaso Ngcobo | Tweezy | 04:40 |
| 15. | "Sthandwa Sam" (featuring Linda) | Trevor Sineke*Mpilo Shabangu*Mthokozisi Mkhathini*Lusaso Ngcobo*Linda Sifumba | Trey | 05:20 |
| 16. | "Saso" (Interlude) | Trevor Sineke*Mpilo Shabangu*Lusaso Ngcobo | Trey | 04:32 |
| 17. | "How You Been" | Thelumusa Samuel Owen*Thulasizwe Dlamini*Trevor Sineke*Mthokozisi Mkhathini*Lusaso Ngcobo | Trey | 04:23 |
| 18. | "Toast" (Outro) | Trevor Sineke*Lusaso Ngcobo*Mthokozisi Mkhathini | Trey | 08:13 |
| Total length: | | | | 81:46 |

== Release history ==
| Country | Date | Format | Label |
|---|---|---|---|
| South Africa | July 31, 2015 | Digital download | Afrotainment, DreamTeam Music Group |
| South Africa | July 31, 2015 | CD | Afrotainment, DreamTeam Music Group |
