= Bulletscript =

South African metal band

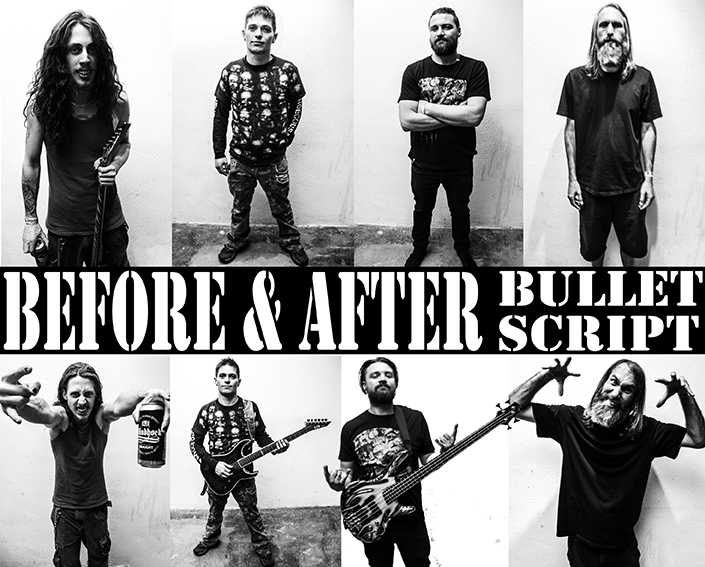
- Bulletscript, 2015

Background information
- Origin: Cape Town, South Africa
- Genres: Heavy Metal
- Years active: 2006-present
- Members: Brett Bruton; Jacques Hugo; Oliver Saggerson; Jacques du Toit; Kyle Curran

Bulletscript is a five-piece South African metal band from Cape Town. They were formed in 2006.

== History ==
Bulletscript toured Namibia with Half Price in 2015. They also participated in the South African Wacken metal battle Final.

In 2015, Bulletscript opened for Darkest Hour in Cape Town.

== Studio Releases ==
- Knotted (2014)

== Band members ==
=== Current members ===
- Brett Bruton - Vocals
- Jacques Hugo - Guitar
- Oliver Saggerson - Guitar
- Jacques du Toit - Bass
- Kyle Curran - Drums

=== Previous members ===
- Ian Watson
- Marcus van der Tuin
- Matthew Howard-Tripp
