= Deon Maas =

South African filmmaker, writer and journalist

- Born: Deon Maas; Durban, South Africa
- Occupations: Director, Writer, Journalist, Media personality
- Years active: 1980–present
- Notable work: Punk in Africa

Deon Maas is a South African filmmaker, writer and journalist. He is best known for directing the critically acclaimed documentaries such as Punk in Africa, Jam Sandwich and Dis Rugby!.

== Personal life ==
Maas was born and grew up in Durban, South Africa. He is currently resides in Berlin with his wife.

== Career ==
He started his career in marketing at First National Bank. After a short stint at the bank, he became a journalist for many newspapers such as: "You / Huisgenoot", "Rooi Rose", "Personality" and "Scope". Meanwhile, he became the editor of "Youth" magazine. In early 1980s, he developed an interest in music, and particularly discovered his talent for hip hop in 1985. After that, Maas started to work for record companies. Then in 1990, he discovered a special brand of hip hop originating from the Cape Flats. In the meantime, he worked for Tusk Music as Music Manager from 1992 and 1998. After quitting from that, he joined with "Gallo Music" in 1998 as Marketing and later General Manager until 2003. As a journalist, he continued to work as a presenter of the talk show "Saturday Night" telecast on KykNET.

In 2006, he worked as a judge on "Afrikaanse Idols" season 1 along with Taliep Petersen, Mynie Grové and Sean Else. As an author, he wrote the bestselling book Witboy in Africa. In 2008, he wrote the television serial Dis Rugby! and documentary Durban Poison, both received popularity. After the success, he directed the serial Jam Sandwich and reality show with the same name. Apart from that, Maas was the former head of Gallo Records.

He also the produced a reality show ‘Gulder Ultimate Search’ in Nigeria, along with Jam Sandwich and Fortuinsoekers. He was fired after a viral boycott campaign when he wrote about Satanism: “a religion that has the right to be practiced” in his first column in "Rapport". After that, he also worked as the creative director for the South African Music Awards, and then as the marketing manager for Marvel Comics. Then in 1997, he involved to launch the album "The Motherload Compilation". In 2011, Maas launched a nationwide contest called "Hip Hop Kop" where large number of Afrikaans rappers compete for a R100,000 recording contract with Ghetto Ruff Records.

In 2012, he co-directed the documentary musical film Punk in Africa with Keith Jones. The film received mixed reviews from critics and screened at many film festivals such as International Film Festival Rotterdam. He is also the founder of documentary film company "Meerkat Media" in August 2014. In 2017, Maas moved to the textile industry along with the fashion line "First World".

== Filmography ==
Year	Film	Role	Genre	Ref.
2008	Dis Rugby!	Writer	TV series	
2008	Durban Poison	Writer	Documentary	
2008	Jam Sandwich	Director, Executive producer	TV series	
2010	Gulder Ultimate Search	Writer	TV series	
2012	Punk in Africa	Director, writer	Documentary	
2013	Die Ballade van Robbie de Wee	DJ Witboy	Film	
2016	Jam Sandwich	Producer	TV series	
