= John Ireland (South African musician) =

South African pop artist (born 1954)

John Ireland (born 23 August 1954) is a South African pop artist who began performing in the late 1970s. His single "I Like" charted in the top-20 in South Africa for 15 weeks in 1982. Another well-received single was "You're Living Inside My Head", which is based on the English folk song "Greensleeves". John Ireland is the stage name of Dr John Griffith, a reclusive man who almost never gives interviews.
