= Captain Stu =

South African ska band

- Also known as: Captain Stu & The Llamas
- Origin: Cape Town, South Africa
- Genres: Cape Town Ska/Reggae
- Years active: 2002–2014
- Past members: Nick Charlie Key, James Klopper, Ryan McArthur, Joshua Watson, Jon Shaban, Clement Carr, JP Arrow, Dylan Hichens, Stigue Nel, Matt Willis, Devin Jones, Ryk Otto
- Website: http://www.captainstu.co.za/

Captain Stu was a South African ska band. The band developed their signature style in the Cape Town ska scene, combining elements of jazz and reggae with South African influences to create an upbeat sound reflecting the atmosphere of Cape Town.

After their formation in 2002, the band released two full-length albums with founding member and lead singer Nick Charlie Key. After Key's departure in 2009, Captain Stu released a short EP in 2010. In 2007, they came under management by Sophie Doherty, a music management graduate from the UK.

== History ==
=== The Untold Tales ===
Captain Stu was formed in 2002 with two members, initially named 'Captain Stu and the Llamas'. By 2004 the band had grown to seven members, before going back down to six. As a result of frequent gigs, they began to be recognised by some of the more prominent bands in Cape Town at the time, including Hog Hoggidy Hog and The Rudimentals. Captain Stu became their protégées and were invited to play with them at gigs on numerous occasions. Lee Thompson and Ross McDonald from Hog Hoggidy Hog worked with them on the pre-production of their debut album The Untold Tales, released in July 2005. The album was a success, with the launch night attended by over 1300 fans (as well as local press and radio), and the music video was aired on MTV Base for a number of months.

The band spent the next few writing music for their new album and playing with a number of local and international groups, including opening for Skalladin on their worldwide tour. Their 2007 nationwide tour included performances at Uprisings Festival in Durban and with renowned group Fuzigish in Johannesburg, to positive reviews.

In 2008, Captain Stu entered the Virgin Mobile "Road To V" competition, which saw them involved in workshops with many of the industry's top professionals and performing at various shows in Cape Town and Johannesburg, culminating in a performance at the Coca-Cola Dome where they shared the stage with Maroon 5 and OneRepublic, amongst others.

=== The Adventures of Captain Stu ===
In February 2009, they released their second album, The Adventures of Captain Stu.

The first single from their second album, "The Journey", reached #2 on the Tuks FM South Africa Top 10, as well as #4 on the MK University Charts. The second single from the album, "More Than Friends", was released in June 2009 to radio stations nationwide and reached #1 on the Tuks FM South Africa Top 10. The music video was released in July and reached #5 on the MK Top 10 Music Video Chart. In July, Captain Stu returned to the north of South Africa for the third time and toured to Johannesburg and Pretoria with appearances on Studio 1, UJFM and Tuks FM. The third single from the album, "Shake", was released in August 2009 and reached #2 on the Tuks FM chart.

Captain Stu appeared on MK Celeb in October 2009 and MK Unplugged in January 2010. They have also appeared at festivals including Splashy Fen in Underberg (2008, 2010), Oppikoppi in Northam (2009) and the Grahamstown Festival (2009).

Founding member and front man Nick Charlie Key left the band in October 2009 to pursue a career overseas. The now 5-piece group released an EP titled Free Music in October 2010.

== Discography ==
- The Untold Tales (2005)
- The Adventures of Captain Stu (2009)
- Free Music EP (2010)
