= Neels Mattheus =

Neels Mattheus (30 August 1935 – 23 January 2003) was a South African Afrikaner traditional musician.

Mattheus was one of South Africa's best known traditional musicians of the Boeremusiek genre. His career spanned several decades, and included radio and television appearances, prizes and awards.

He was known for his virtuoso concertina playing, and combined the traditional genre of Boeremusiek with later genres such as jazz to produce a vibrant, modern sound while preserving the essence and beauty of Boeremusiek. A regular performer at festivals and dance halls throughout South Africa, Mattheus gained a reputation for affability and warmth. His hits, such as the Groot Leeu Mazurka, Mooi Bly and Gamtoos Opskud, were enjoyed by South Africans of all ages.

Mattheus was survived by two sons, Deon and Kevin, both musicians in the Boeremusiek and rock genres in their own right, who have started a band named after their father, playing also with his granddaughters, Michelle and Jo-Anne.
