= Martin PK =

South African Musical artist

- Birth name: Martin Phike
- Also known as: Martin PK, Mr Superman, Man on a Mission, Mr Holy Spirit, The Gospel Stepper
- Origin: Gugulethu, Western Cape, South Africa
- Genres: Gospel
- Occupation(s): Musical Artist, actor, song writer, entrepreneur, ceo
- Years active: 1998–present
- Labels: PK Records
- Website: www.martinpk.com

Martin PK is a South African singer, songwriter and actor. He is part of the Christ Embassy's LoveWorld Music and Arts Ministry.

In 2017, Martin PK and his song "Beautiful Jesus" won a LIMA Award for Song of the Year.

== Early life ==
At age 16, it looked like Martin had hit the big time when his brother invited him to be part of a three men group that was to work with top producer, Gabi Le Roux. That group was Inadiflo of "Halala" fame. They signed to Sony Music and released their first album.

In 2004, he entered the Coca-Cola Popstars and was selected out of 15,000 entrants for the winning group, Ghetto Lingo.

== Ghetto Lingo ==
The group has since released two albums, and had its fair share of the live music scene, in the country.

== Martin's acting career ==
Martin has also gone on to appear on e.tv’s "Backstage" SABC 7de Laan, Channel O and presented "Bibo" on SABC2 nd e.tv Pop Star.
