= Sterling EQ =

South African all-woman classic crossover group

Sterling EQ is an all-woman classical crossover group from South Africa. Sterling EQ won a South African Music Award (SAMA) in 2011, becoming only the second girl band to do so.

== History ==
Sterling EQ was formed in 2007, and is led by flutist Carina Bruwer, who is also an ex-professional open water swimmer, who holds some South African and international records. Other members changed between 2007 and 2009, until the release of Sterling EQ's debut album, Nova (produced by South African Kwaito producer Gabi Le Roux), when the quartet's line-up settled, with Bruwer on flute, Eriel Huang on violin, Magdalene Minnaar on viola and Ariella Caira on cello. In 2010 the band self-released their debut live DVD "Sterling EQ Live in Concert", which won them the SAMA Award in 2011. Minnaar left the band in pursue of a singing career in 2010. She was replaced in 2010 by Renate Riedemann. Sterling EQ's 2nd studio album, Sterling Speel Afrikaans, was released in October 2010. This was a concept album, consisting of instrumental versions of Afrikaans songs. In September 2011, Sterling EQ signed a record deal with EMI South Africa, and during March 2012, it was announced that EMI would release their 3rd studio album in August 2012. In March 2013, the group announced on their Facebook page, that Riedemann would be leaving the group and that the band would continue as a three-piece. In August 2013, South African violinist Luca Hart joined the group when Huang relocated to Boston.

They featured as special guest stars on the semi-finals of Season 7 of SA Pop Idols in 2011.

== Discography ==
- Pulse (Audio CD, 2012)
1. Pulse
2. Sarabande
3. Carnaval
4. Arabesque
5. Mumbai Theme
6. Chimera
7. Asturias
8. Genesis
9. Khulu's Groove
10. Crane's Crying
11. O Fortuna
12. Mission Impossible
13. Bravo
- Sterling EQ Live in Concert (Live DVD, 2010)
1. Electric storm
2. Badinirie
3. Spring
4. Bach's kitten at play
5. Reel around the sun
6. Caruso
7. Spain
8. Theme from caravans
9. Beethoven's fifth
10. Nkalakatha
11. Toccata & fugue
12. Nova
13. Bombay crush
14. Mundian to bach ke (Emo adams)
15. Czardas
16. Tango fatale
17. Storm
18. Sway
19. Mbube
- Sterling Speel Afrikaans (Audio CD, 2010)
- Nova (Audio CD, 2009)

== Awards and nominations ==
- South African Music Award (SAMA) 2011 for Sterling EQ Live in Concert (Live DVD)
- Ghoema Music Award 2013 for Pulse
- Huisgenoot Tempo Award 2013 for Pulse
- SAMA nominations for Nova, Sterling Speel Afrikaans
- Tempo Award nomination for Sterling Speel Afrikaans
