= Crow Black Sky =

South African black metal band

- Origin: Cape Town, Western Cape, South Africa
- Genres: Black Metal
- Years active: 2009–present
- Label: Independent
- Members: Gideon Lamprecht; Ryan Higgo; Lawrence Jaeger
- Past members: Chris Gilbert; Kean Malcolmson; Brad Saunders; Stephen Spinas; Arie Korf
- Website: crowblacksky.com

Crow Black Sky is a South African black metal band from Cape Town which has been active since 2009. The band has released two albums, with later material described by the band as "cosmic black metal". Multiple lineup changes occurred between the release of the debut album, Pantheion (2010), and 2012. On 17 January 2018, they released their second album, Sidereal Light: Volume One. The band releases its material independently.

== History ==
In April 2009 Crow Black Sky was formed by Kean Malcolmson and Stephen Spinas, who recruited the now lead guitarist Gideon Lamprecht. They were joined by vocalist Ryan Higgo soon thereafter, and their first live appearance took place later that year. Arie Korf, the original drummer, was replaced by Lawrence Jaeger (Wings of Aggression, The Broken Result). Several guitarist changes occurred, including Westley Byrne, Chris Gilbert (Dogs of War), Jesse Vos (Wildernessking), and Brad Saunders (The Broken Result).

The band began working on their debut album, Pantheion, which was entirely self-produced, at their home recording studio in February 2010 . The album was officially released on 18 December 2010, and was well received by many international critics. However, the band has mentioned that they consider it to be more of a demo release than anything else. In response to the praise received, a music video for the song "Stars of God" was released in December 2012. Crow Black Sky was booked for a national tour in support of Canadian death metallers Kataklysm in May 2011, but the tour was subsequently cancelled.

The lineup was solidified by the end of 2012, consisting of Gideon Lamprecht (guitars), Ryan Higgo (bass and vocals) and Lawrence Jaeger (drums).

On 17 January 2018 Crow Black Sky returned with Sidereal Light: Volume One, the first offering in a series of cosmic black metal releases.

== Musical direction and influences ==
"Musically the band’s sound is an amalgam of styles that incorporate inspired progressive movements, along with classical, atmospheric, and acoustic elements. Their songs are aggressive and at times brutal while also remaining melodically accessible, crisp and heavy."

"The musicality and songwriting on Pantheion is of really high quality. It is very easy to get lost in Crow Black Sky's music and a lot of it would not feel out of place in an action/fantasy film, accompanying Tolkien-esque battles or sprawling mountain vistas."

== Band members ==
=== Current ===
1. Ryan Higgo – vocals (2009–present)
2. Gideon Lamprecht – lead guitar (2009–present)
3. Lawrence Jaeger – drums (2010–present)

=== Previous ===
1. Chris Gilbert – lead guitar (2010–2011)
2. Kean Malcolmson – rhythm guitar (2009–2012)
3. Stephen Spinas – bass guitar (2009–2012)
4. Arie Korf – drums (2009–2010)
5. Brad Saunders – lead guitar (2011–2012)

== Discography ==
=== Albums ===
- Pantheion (2010)
- Sidereal Light: Volume One (2018)
