= Dreamteam =

South African musical group

DreamTeam
- Also known as: DreamTeam Durban; DreamTeam DBN; Rookies of the Year
- Origin: Durban, KwaZulu-Natal, South Africa
- Genres: Hip hop; house; kwaito
- Years active: 2011–present
- Labels: Dreamteam Music Group; Afrotainment
- Members: Saso (2011–present); Trey (2011–present)
- Past members: Zulu Mkhathini (2011–2018)
- Website: www.dreamteamdbn.co.za

Dreamteam is a South African hip hop musical group formed at KwaZulu-Natal.They first nominated at the South African Hip Hop Awards in 2013.

The group was officially formed in 2011, and shot to fame in 2013, after the release of independent album, "The Blow Up", which was released in March 2013. They are most known for major debut single "Tsekede", a song with a version that later featured major South African hip hop artist AKA, and fellow Durban-based musical trio, Big Nuz.

== Music career ==
Childhood friends Mthoko Mkhathini and Lusaso Ngcobo were initially part of a hip hop dance crew. In 2011, they formed a trio with Saso's older brother's friend, Trevor Sineke. Their first gig as a trio was in a well-liked spot in Durban, called De La Sol. To their surprise, the crowd responded favourably.

Their debut major single "Tsekede" from their mixtape The Blow Up, was released in 2013. Their mixtape was well received, gaining over 12,000 downloads and distribution of 0 physical copies in March 2013. Later that year, they enlisted major South African hip hop recording artist, AKA, and fellow Durban-based music group Big Nuz for the remix of "Tsekede", which eventually became a summer anthem for that year. Other widely favored singles from their mixtape include "Ask Enibhadi" and "Izass".

Dreamteam earned their first nomination at the South African Hip Hop Awards in 2013 for Freshmen of the Year.

They were featured on DJ Fisherman's debut single "Call Out", along with frequent collaborator NaakMusiQ, which was released on 14 August 2014. MTV Base VJ and rapper Nomuzi Mabena a.k.a. Moozlie, from the Cashtime Life hip hop collective, twerks in the "Izass" music video.

Dreamteam's music video for their early 2015 single "Dubane", which is a tribute to their hometown Durban, has been compared to the music video American rapper Ludacris recorded in the same city in 2005.

DreamTeam released their single "What's Your Name" which contains features from fellow South African singers Donald and NaakMusiQ, in March 2015. The song would later serve as the debut single from their first major album Dreams Never Die.

Their debut studio album, Dreams Never Die, was released on 31 July 2015. Among the list of guest features for the album are fellow South African music acts AKA, Donald, NaakMusiQ, Big Nuz, and Nigerian rapper Ice Prince.

== Artistry ==
Trey serves as the executive producer for the group. Dash is most notable for his catchphrases "Ungasabi" and "Ai Ngeke", which in isiZulu, roughly translate to "do not fear / do not be scared" and "will not" respectively. All three members rap on all of their songs. Their music incorporates elements of new school hip hop, as well as kwaito and house music.

== Discography ==
=== Studio albums ===
List of studio albums
Title	Album details
Dreams Never Die	Released: 31 July 2015; Label: Dreamteam Music Group, Afrotainment; Format: digital download, CD

=== Mixtapes ===
List of studio albums
Title	Album details
The Blow Up	Released: March 2013; Label: Dreamteam Music Group, Afrotainment; Format:Digital Download
