= Falling Mirror =

South African rock band

- Origin: Cape Town, South Africa
- Genres: Alternative rock
- Years active: 1978–2013
- Label: Rhythm Records
- Past members: Allan Faull, Nielen Marais
- Website: fallingmirror.wordpress.com

Falling Mirror was an alternative rock band from Cape Town, South Africa founded in 1978 by cousins Allan Faull and Nielen Marais, who had adopted the stage name Falling Mirror.

The band gained popularity during the late 1970s and 1980s, and they are often associated with the alternative rock scene in South Africa during that time. The band’s name was derived from the duo’s surnames (“Faull and Mirror”).

Falling Mirror’s music is characterized by its eclectic style, incorporating elements of new wave, rock & roll, blues and psychedelic rock, blended with a dark pop sensibility.

“Everything we do is psychotic…” — Nielen Mirror, 1985

One of their most well-known songs is “Johnny Calls the Chemist,” which became a radio hit in South Africa in the ’80s and is considered a classic.

While Falling Mirror may not be widely known on the global music scene, they have left a significant impact on South African music history, particularly within the alternative rock genre.

Allan Faull died in September 2013.

Nielen Mirror died in September 2024

== Discography ==
=== Singles ===
- "I Am The Actor" / "Makin' Out With Granny" (1979) Warner Brothers, WBS 722
- "Highway Blues" (1979)
- "If I Was James Dean" (1980) also released by WEA Europe
- "Neutron Bop" (1980)
- "Johnny Calls The Chemist" (1986)
- "Let's Paint The House Pink"
- "Cosmic Night" (aka Louise The Astronaut) (1986) Warner Brothers, WBS 775
- "As Sly As The Fox"
- "Encounter In A Takeaway Shop" (1987) WEA France (12-inch 45 rpm single, 258426-0)

=== Albums ===
- Zen Boulders (1979) WEA Records, WBC 9011
- The Storming Of The Loft (1980) WEA Records, WBC 9013
- Fantasy Kid (1981) WEA Records, WBC 9021
- Johnny Calls The Chemist (1986) WEA Records, WBC 9029
- Shattered (compilation LP) (1989) Tusk, TUSB 3008
- Shattered (CD re-issue with 3 bonus tracks) (1992) Tusk, TUCD 3008
- Hammerhead Hotel (download-only, November 2006, recorded 1996) Spaced Out Sounds
- Johnny Calls The Chemist (CD re-issue with bonus tracks) (May 2001) RetroFresh, freshcd 112
- Zen Boulders / The Storming Of The Loft (2 for 1 CD re-issue) (August 2002) RetroFresh, freshcd124
- Singles and Rarities (Virtual Collection, compiled by Brian Currin) (September 2008) Spaced Out Sounds
- Special Agent Duck (December 2010) Spaced Out Sounds

=== Various artist compilations ===
- Sharp Cuts Volume 1 [1992] Tusk, WOND 103
- Sharp Cuts Volume 2 [1994] Tusk, WOND 121
- 40 Single Hits 40 Hit Singles Volume 2 [1997] Sony Music, CDSM 010 Z
- SA Top 40 Hits Of All Time Volume 6 [2002] Sting Music, STIDFCD 037
- SA Rock Gold (3-CD set) [2010] Universal Music, TUMGCD 100

=== Guest appearances (Allan Faull) ===
- McCully Workshop Inc [1970], Trutone
- Buccaneer – McCully Workshop [1998] MicMac, MS001
