= No Friends of Harry =

Alternative rock,Post Punk band from South Africa

No Friends Of Harry
- Origin: Johannesburg, South Africa
- Genres: Alternative rock, gothic rock, post punk
- Years active: 1986–1998
- Labels: Principal; Clear Cut; EMI; RPM records Fresh Music
- Past members: Rob McLennan; Dave de Vetta; Ian Wiggins; Annette McLennan; Adrian Hamilton; Mark Williams

No Friends Of Harry were a South African gothic/alternative rock band from Johannesburg who were active in the 1980s and 1990s. They released three albums on independent South African labels, with a compilation album being released by EMI Records shortly after the band broke up in 1998. The band has since released a new album in 2020 and still do shows across South Africa and London

== Band members ==
- Robert Mclennan – Lead Singer / Guitar
- Annette McLennan – Drummer
- Dave Devetta – Bass
- Ian Wiggins – Guitars
- Adrian Hamilton – Keyboards
- Mark Williams – Manager

== Discography ==
The band released five albums and three singles, as well as appearing on compilation albums with other artists.

=== Albums ===
- One Came Running (1987), Principal
- Into the Valley (1989), Principal
- Fifteen Seconds (1991), Clear Cut
- Fly By Night (1998), EMI
- The Present has Passed – The Best of No Friends Of Harry (2003), Fresh Music
- Fifteen Seconds Redux (Remixes) (2018)

=== Singles and EPs ===
- "Competition Rules" (1987), Principal
- "Paint it Black" (1989), Principal
- "The Present has Passed" (1990), RPM records
