= Yorxe =

South African singer and songwriter

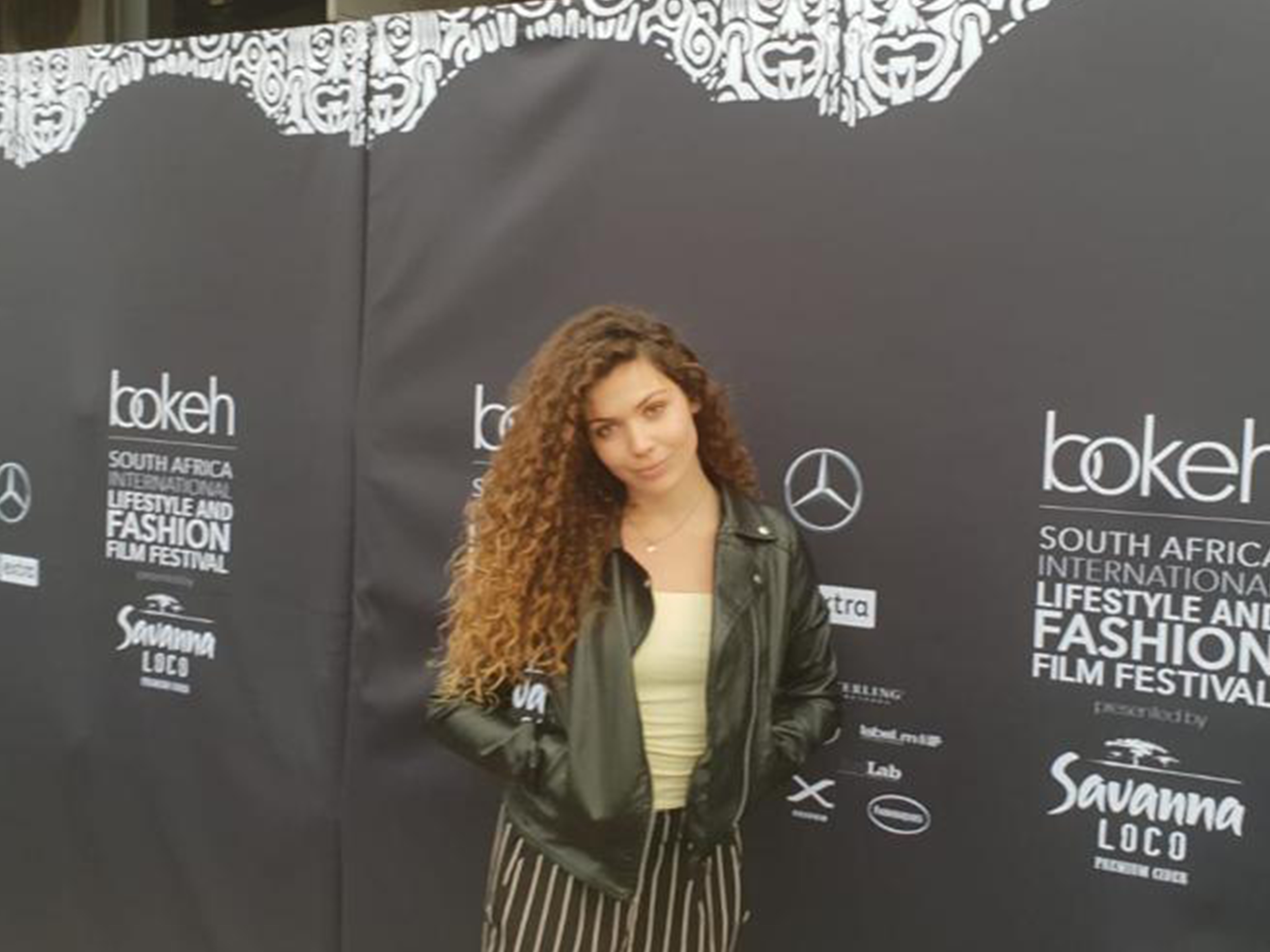
- Yorxe at Bokeh Lifestyle And Fashion Film Festival

Background information
- Born: Roxanne Jeanal Bolzonello; June 2, 1998 (age 28); Cape Town, South Africa
- Genres: Pop, dark pop
- Occupations: singer; songwriter
- Instruments: Vocals; piano; guitar
- Years active: 2018–present
- Label: Right Coast Music
- Website: yorxeofficial.com

Roxanne Jeanal Bolzonello (born June 2, 1998), known under the stage name Yorxe, is a South African singer and songwriter. She first gained attention in late 2020 when her single "Down with Me" was featured in a trailer for the movie The Doorman. She also released her singles "Bang Bang", "Hide Your Bodies", and "Like Me" in 2020.

== Career ==
=== Early life and influences ===
Yorxe began producing and writing music at the age of 13, while also performing on world-class cruise liners and hustling as a street busker. She grew up in a non-musical family, but fell in love with music when she began listening to her dad's Pink Floyd and Van Morrison CDs at a young age. After writing a series of unreleased songs in her bedroom-turned-studio, “Yorxe” was a singular pseudonym born in mid 2018 to symbolize a new alter-ego and a fresh start. Yorxe's ambition is "to try to get big enough to hear my music in other people's cars in traffic."

=== 2019-present: Commercial singles ===
On January 17, 2020, Yorxe released her debut single Down With Me. The single is a tribute to the struggles of dating someone unorthodox and it has an alternative pop music feel with a driving rhythm and a melodic baseline. The "Down with Me" music video was also released on Vevo on January 24, 2020. On August 28, 2020, her debut single "Down with Me" was featured in the official trailer for the movie The Doorman, which sparked Yorxe's popularity on Spotify and YouTube.

On February 14, 2020, Yorxe released her next single "Bang Bang". According to S. Ben Ali, "Bang Bang" is "a beautiful piece of art and an honest reflection of Yorxe's lyrical strength."

Yorxe also released "Hide Your Bodies" on April 10, 2020. The single is a combination of alternative rock and dark pop, with a unique sound full of bass, synths and real time instrumentation like piano and electric guitar.

On August 14, 2020, Yorxe premiered her single "Like Me". According to Yorxe, the single is "about every brutally honest and unspoken thought you've ever had, specifically topics that are taboo and uncomfortable." Similar to her single "Hide Your Bodies", it maintains ominous production undertones which is slowly coming together as one of Yorxe's signature sounds. Yorxe released an official music video for the single "Like Me" on Vevo on August 14, 2020.

Yorxe's newest single "Black Dog" was released on October 1, 2021. According to Indie Criollo, "Black Dog" is a heavy and pure rock track to enjoy.

== Discography ==
=== Singles ===
- "Down with Me" (2020)
- "Bang Bang" (2020)
- "Hide Your Bodies" (2020)
- "Like Me" (2020)
- "Black Dog" (2021)
