= The Square Set =

Rock band from Cape Town, South Africa

- Origin: South Africa
- Genres: Psychedelic rock, blues rock, hard rock, jazz-rock, acid rock
- Years active: 1966–1974
- Labels: Epic Columbia, Decca
- Past members: Neville Whitmill; Keith Moffat; Derek Marks; Mercia Love; Nol Klinkhamer; Don Robertson; Malcolm Postlethwaite; Mike Faure; Johnny Boshoff; Tony Moore

The Square Set was a 1960s rock band from Cape Town South Africa, known for their songs Silence is Golden (SA number 1 Hit (1967)) "Carol Corina" (SA number 10 hit (1968)), and "That's What I Want" (international number 1 hit in Brazil, Argentina, and Portugal (1971-1972)).

== History ==
The band formed in March 1966 and was called Neville Whitmill and the Humans. Founder members Nol, Neville, Derek and Keith rehearsed daily for 6 months composing new songs like 'Silence is Golden', 'Dance With Me', 'Night Then Comes The Morning' and learning suitable covers always given them the Square Set feel before contracting their first professional gig at the Clifton Hotel.

Nol Klinkhamer hailed from the Conservatoire of Music in Holland having attained a degree in Jazz and classical music. He played piano, organ and the vibraphone also trying his hand at the Harpsichord. His love of Jazz music and the freedom it gave him to improvise, was certainly a major influence in the unusual sounds that were created by this unusual combination of players. Neville Whitmill a Soul singer from Cape Town previously performing with The Settlers, had influences from Buddy Holly, Ray Charles, Ottis Redding, Marvin Gaye. Derek Marks from Cape Town enjoyed rock bass playing previously performing with 'The Marksmen', 'The Hawks' later 'The Beathovens Five', 'Ronnie Singer Sound' with influences from bands like The Beatles, Small faces, Dave Clark 5 and Keith Moffat from Port Elizabeth previous drummer for Ronnie Singer also enjoy playing Rock music. During the rehearsal stage they landed a gig at the "Stables nite Club" in Church Street Cape Town which gave them a venue to hone and perfect their craft. The venue was usually packed to capacity to hear the band. At this time the band recorded their music and in August 1966 met Ian Martin (recording engineer) and Lindsay du Plessis (owner) of A.V.S studios Bree Street CT. It was decided at this time that a name change was much needed. During a studio break the four got together to thrash out names and it was Nol Klinhamer who suggested "The Square Set".

The band combined soul vocals and jazz organ (with the Hammond organ growing in popularity at the time) with rock bass and drums. The Hammond sound can be heard on most of The Square Set songs.

The previously unreleased 'Silence Is Golden' had a makeover with Graham Beggs at the helm and was released on Gallos Continental label in or about March 1967. It reached number 4 on the Springbok radio charts in August 1967. This led to the release of the band's first full album, 'Silence Is Golden'.

'That's What I Want', a song first recorded by UK group The Marauders in 1963, was also recorded by The Ronnie Singer Sound, a Cape Town band Marks had previously worked with. The latter version was given to The Square Set to record. The song was changed to accommodate the lineup and added to the 'Silence Is Golden' album. This song was later released in South America on the Decca label and rose to number 1 in Brazil, Argentina 1971 and number 1 in Portugal in 1972.

The band went on to record a follow-up album, Loving You is Sweeter than Ever, with the original members, but then the band took a break. Nol Klinkhamer went to study jazz at Berklee college of music in California, after which Nol Klinkhamer and Neville Whitmill were joined by Johnny Boshoff and Tony Moore on Bass and drums to record Those Many Feelings in 1972, an album influenced by contemporary jazz rock musicians like Michael Colombier.

== Members ==
- Nol Klinkhamer, Dutch born Jazz piano/organ, left October 1968, rejoined 1972
- Neville Whitmill, Cape Town born lead vocals, left October 1968, rejoined 1972
- Keith Moffat, Born Port Elizabeth drums on first album
- Derek Marks, bass on first two albums, Carol Carina. Left October 1968
- Mercia Love, vocals, joined November 1967
- Don Robertson, drums, left September 1967, ex Gene Rockwell and the Falcons
- Malcolm Postlethwaite, drums, joined September 1967
- Mike Faure, sax, 1968
- Johnny Boshoff, bass, 1972
- Tony Moore, drums, 1972

== Discography ==
=== Albums ===
- Silence Is Golden, Continental ZB 8167, 1967
- Loving You Is Sweeter Than Ever, Gallotone GALP 1573, 1968
- That's What I Want, Continental/Sony SZB 8221, 1969
- Those Many Feelings, Gallotone SGALP 1657, 1972

=== Singles ===
The Square Set

- "Silence Is Golden"/"It's A Man's World", Continental PD 9222, 1967; SA no. 3
- "Carol Corina"/"U", Continental PD 9284, 1967
- "Loving You Is Sweeter Than Ever"/"Georgia (On My Mind)", Continental PD 9348, 1968
- "That's What I Want"/"Come On", Jazzville SL.5, 1968

Neville Whitmill

- "Have Mercy On Me"/"Get Me Some Help", Continental PD 9773, 1971; SA no. 2
- "That's Why"/"Gone Those Days", Continental PD 9796, 1971
- "Silence Is Golden"/"One More Tear, One More Heartache", Continental 9982, 1974

Nol Klinkhamer

- "The In Crowd / Critics Choice", Smanje Manje SJM 12, 1967
