= Donald (singer) =

South African singer

- Born: Donald Moatshe; 7 February 1985 (age 41); Mantserre, North West, South Africa
- Origin: Rustenburg, North West, South Africa
- Genres: Afro-Soul; Dance; House; R&B
- Occupations: Musician; vocalist; performer; songwriter; recording artist; entertainer
- Years active: 2002–present
- Label: D-Exclusive

Donald Moatshe (born 7 February 1985), commonly known by the mononym Donald, is a South African afro-soul singer, songwriter, recording artist and entertainer. He was born in the town of Rustenburg, in the North-West province.

His career began at an early age, and he signed a record deal with the Will of Steel Imprint in 2008. He came to prominence with his single "I Deserve" released in 2011.

== Life and career ==
Donald Moatshe was born in the village of Kraalhoek in the North West province. He began singing at a young age in the church choir, where his musical talent was discovered.

=== 2011:Train of Love ===
In 2008, he signed a recording deal with South African DJ Cleo on his Will of Steel imprint. The label released Donald's debut album, which received a lukewarm reception. He departed from the DJ Cleo's label, and started his own imprint, D-Exclusive in 2011, and began production on his second album Love Train.

=== 2011:Love Train ===
He rose to fame in 2011 with his notable single I Deserve, which later appeared on his much anticipated and critically acclaimed second album Love Train, which was released in 2012. He released three singles from the album, titled I Deserve, Denial, and Over the Moon. I Deserve topped the RAMs Top 100 & Top 40 charts, as well as entering the Top 10 on the Media Guide charts, instantly making him a celebrity in South Africa.

Film and Production Media The success of the album brought him much attention, enabling him to make appearances on South African TV shows such as Rhythm City, 3Talk with Noeleen, MTV Base, Vuzu and various others. Over the Moon became a well known song in Africa at large.

Donald has worked with fellow South African acts such as KB, Malaika, Selaelo Selota and rapper Slikour. Donald was nominated for the Best New Artist at the 2012 Channel O Music Video Awards.

In 2013, Donald became the stand-out artist at the 2013 Metro FM Music Awards for having been the most nominated artist; among the nominations were Best Produced Album, Best Video, Best Male and Best Dance Album. He was nominated for Best International Act: Africa at BET Awards 2013.

=== 2015:Train of Love ===
Two years later, in 2015, his album critically acclaimed album Train of Love was certified Platinum by the Recording Industry of South Africa.

In March 2015, Donald was featured on Dreamteam's first single "What's Your Name" from their debut studio album Dreams Never Die, along with South African singer NaakMusiQ.

=== 2014:Black and White (2014) ===
On March 25, 2014, his third studio album Black and White was released, and was certified Gold by the Recording Industry of South Africa, only three months after its release.

At MTV Africa Music Awards 2014, he received a nomination for Best Male Artist of the Year.

In October 2021 Donald announced his album, Dreams, releasing in October the first single from the album, "Inkayezi", an RnB song.

== Discography ==
=== Studio albums ===
Title	Album details	Certification
Know You Better	Released: 2010; Label: Will of Steel Productions; Formats: CD	
Train of Love	Released: 2012; Label: D-Exclusive, Universal Music; Formats: CD, Digital Download	RISA: Platinum
Black and White	Released: 2014; Label: D-Exclusive, Universal Music; Formats: CD, Digital Download	RISA: Platinum
