= Illana May =

South African musician (born 1976)

Illana May (born February 1976) is a South African singer-songwriter/guitarist.

She was educated in Messina, (now known as Musina), South Africa at Eric Louw High School.

Averaging over 180 live shows per year, she is the busiest female musician in South Africa. With 7 CDs and a DVD released, her music is popular across Southern Africa.

Whilst performing a wide range of cover songs, she also produces her own original music with a distinct rock feel. She sings in English and Afrikaans, and performs music in the genres of rock, pop, country and western and R&B.

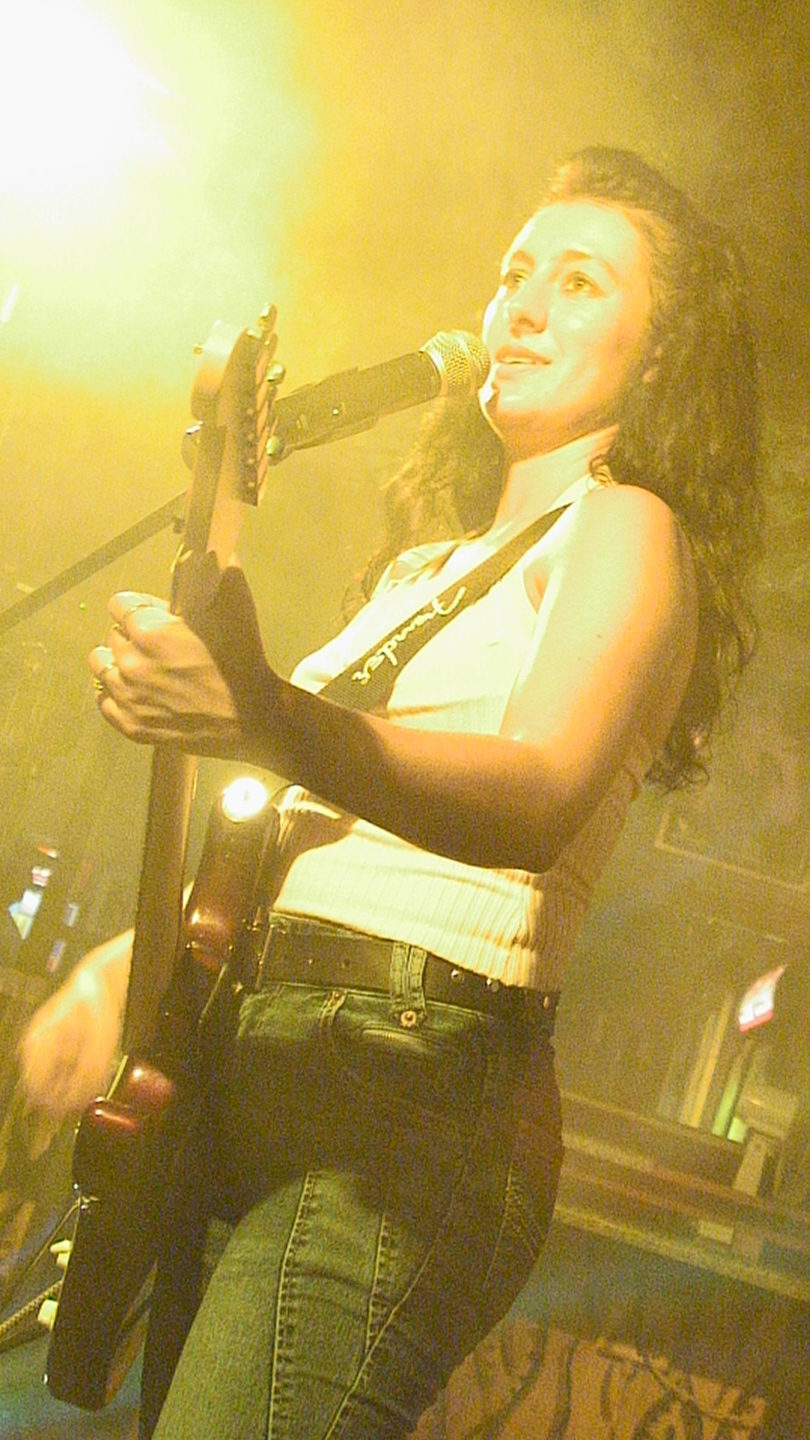
Live on Stage in Rustenburg, North West Province.

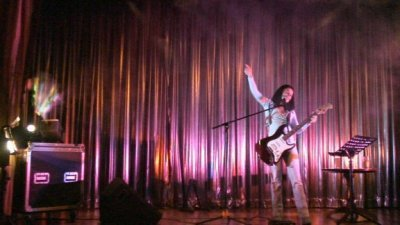
Live on Stage at Graceland Casino, Secunda, Mpumalanga Province

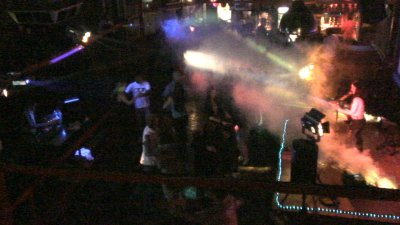
Live on Stage at Bela Bela, Limpopo Province

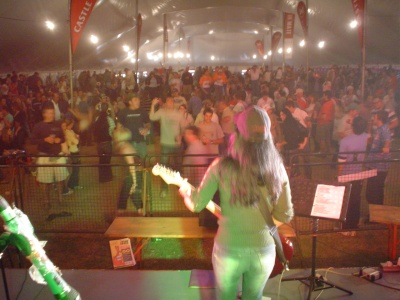
Live on Stage at Thabazimbi, in front of 3000 people Limpopo Province
