= Covenant Voices =

African gospel choir

- Origin: Durban, South Africa
- Years active: 2007–present

Covenant Voices is a South African mass gospel choir with traditional Zulu, jazz, R&B and contemporary music influences. It was founded in 2007 by international televangelist Tim Omotoso, who also mentors the group. The band has 80 members and is based in Durban, South Africa.

== History and evolution ==
The choir was founded and named in 2007 by Rev. Tim Omotoso, after he hosted gospel music auditions. This became the first initiative of the Youth Empowerment Project (Y.E.P.) of Tim Omotoso Global Outreach. The singers had no previous training or experience when the choir was formed, just raw talent waiting to be polished.

In 2008, Covenant Voices gave birth to the girl band, Simply Chrysolite.

== Performance ==
In November 2007, Covenant Voices performed at the T.O.G.O Gala Dinner held at the Durban ICC in South Africa.

Covenant Voices have also shared the stage with well-known South African gospel artists including Pastor Benjamin Dube, and Hlengiwe Mhlaba. They have performed at the Gagasi FM Christmas concert in December 2007, and the success of their performance credited them to perform again at the beach festival concert in the same year.

== Awards and nominations ==
The song "Children (medley)" was nominated at the 2015 Gathering of Africa's Best awards in London; the 2015 Utah Music Awards, US; and the 2015 SABC Crown Gospel Awards in South Africa. Covenant Voices were nominated at the 2015 Utah awards in the same category and at the 2015 SABC Crown Gospel Awards in the Best Engineered song category.
