= Alton Edwards =

Zimbabwean singer

- Citizenship: Zimbabwe
- Occupations: Singer; Writer

Alton Edwards is a Zimbabwean singer, who had a UK Top 20 hit with "I Just Wanna (Spend Some Time with You)" during January 1982. He wrote and recorded a song called "Thank You from Africa" which was a song to thank the Western artists for the help given to Africa, mostly to Ethiopia. The song is still played on Zimbabwean TV and some other African countries. All proceeds were collected by the International Red Cross.

Edwards is uncle to Warren Mills who had hits with "Mickey's Monkey" and "Sunshine" on the Zomba / Jive Records label. Mills is also a cousin to Rozalla, who had hits with "Everybody's Free" and "Are You Ready to Fly". Edwards is still an active singer on the UK circuit. He works frequently with Angelo Starr (Edwin Starr's brother) and Alexander O'Neal.

Edwards appears as himself in the 2011 documentary Dreams of a Life.

== Discography ==
=== Singles ===
Year	Single	Peak chart positions		
Year	Single	US Dance	US R&B	UK
1981	"I Just Wanna (Spend Some Time with You)"	66	75	20
1982	"Strange Woman"	―	―	―
1982	"Shining Light"	―	―	―
1983	"Take Me"	―	―	―
1984	"Everybody's Watching"	―	―	―
"—" denotes releases that did not chart or were not released in that territory.
