= Shiraz (band) =

South African electronic band

- Origin: South Africa
- Years active: 1984–1985
- Labels: Man Alive Productions; Siversong; Trutone Music
- Members: Marshall Harmse; Grant Fisher; Paul Crossley; Terry Owen

Shiraz was a South African group from the 1980s best known for their song "Fighting For Our Lives".

== History ==
Shiraz was formed in 1984 as 'Jeraz' originally, a club band who performed for six months in newly opened 'Club '84' in Pretoria, South Africa. After firing their founder and manager, they renamed the band "Shiraz" and with a newly appointed drummer and keyboard player, continued performing at various venues around greater Johannesburg (Riebeek hotel in Springs and the Germiston Hotel) until their break-up in December 1985. The band's line-up was Victor Kotzen and Liz Allen (vocals), Grant Fisher (bassist), Marshall Harmse (lead guitar), Eddie Gilbert (keyboards and saxophone), Pierre de Vos (drums).

The song "Fighting for our lives" was recorded in 1984 in conjunction with producers Paul Crossley and Terry Owen who presented the lyrics to Fisher and asked the band to put it to music. Fisher and Harmse then collaborated to write the music and play the instruments in the studio version. They performed the song live in multiple clubs around Johannesburg. The song addressed the HIV/Aids pandemic that was starting to become a widespread disease during 1984 when the song was released. Fisher currently lives in Germany and Harmse currently works for Mathambo Productions, and who was involved with South Africa's official presentation video for the winning 2010 FIFA World Cup soccer bid. In 1987, People Like Us covered the Shiraz song "Fighting For Our Lives".
