= Silver Creek Mountain Band =

South African music group

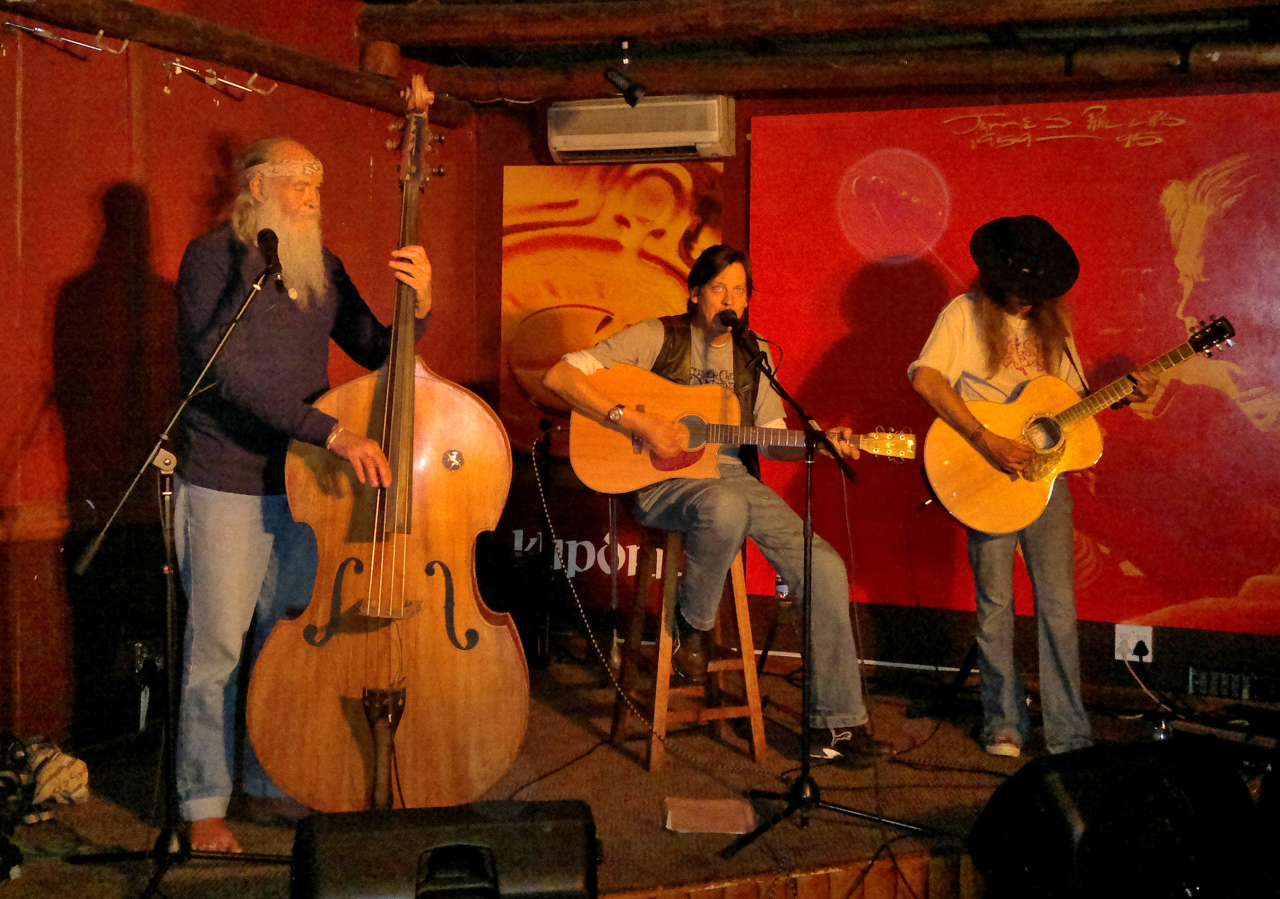
- Silver Creek Mountain Band in 2011

Background information
- Origin: East London, South Africa
- Genres: Folk Songs, Blues, Bluegrass, Folk
- Years active: 1970s-present
- Label: RAP Records
- Members: Rod Dry (Double Bass & Vocals), Dennis Schultz (Banjo, guitar, Dobro Mouth-harp & Vocals), Shugg Dry (Lead Guitarist), Bryan Daniel (Vocals, Guitar, Mouth Harp, Tin Whistle)
- Website: https://silvercreekmountainband.co.za/

Silver Creek Mountain Band is a South African music group that was founded in East London during the early 1970s. Rod Dry, one of the founding members of the band has kept the band alive over the years by appointing new members. Throughout the years more than 30 musicians have been part of the group. In 1981 they released their first album called, Silver Creek Mountain Band. The group has performed in pubs and clubs, weddings, parties, rallies, theatres and self-run venues. The group is known for its formidable range of instruments which includes, among others, the double bass, mandolin, banjo, violin, flute, accordion, tin whistle, guitar and mouth organ.

== Biography ==
Rod Dry was born in Bloemfontein in 1944 and went to school in East London. In high school, he started playing the guitar and met Dennis Schultz in 1965, who was performing at coffee bars and folk clubs. They founded a folk group in 1966 called Clapperdogeons. However, before joining the group permanently, Dry worked on the railways and managed a hypermarket that lasted four years.

Dennis Schultz was born in 1948 and started playing folk music at the age of 16. He first only sang but expanded to the guitar, banjo, dobro and flute. He performed alongside many folk groups but ultimately decided to permanently join the folk group.

Roger Cummings was born in 1950 in East London and started playing the guitar at the age of 15. He was especially interested in rock music but expanded his knowledge of other instruments. For a short time, he joined a rock group in East London but left for Cape Town in search of another. After failing to find a rock band in Cape Town he returned to East London where he met Dry and Schultz and joined the folk group.

David Tarr attended a classical art school during his youth and studied instruments such as the clarinet, violin and cello. By 1971 he had left the school to join the South Country Band. Before permanently joining the group in 1976, Dave Tarr toured with a jazz group through South Africa, Rhodesia (now Zimbabwe) and Botswana and even appeared for eight weeks on a television programme called Hoedown. He joined the folk group after they appeared on Starbound.

=== Career ===
They first stood out at the Natal Folk Music Association festival in 1972 where they performed with several other musicians under their new name Silver Creek Mountain Band. The group turned professional in 1975 and appeared on a television series called Starbound. Their music is difficult to define, and it includes bluegrass, jazz, a cross-section of traditional music and even country music. Their show was dubbed "bluegrass and beyond" and contained "country styles, ranging from western swing and folk through to Cajun, bluegrass and Nashville sounds."

In 1976, the group performed at the Los Angeles Hotel and the Ocean View Hotel in Durban before performing for five weeks at the Market Theatre Café in Johannesburg per the request of David Marks. After these performances, they performed at the Keg 'n Tankard in Pretoria for three months. On 1 September 1977, Roger Cummings suffered a fatal car crash between Johannesburg and Pretoria and left the band with three members. Despite the death of Cummings, the group continued and completed their contract at the Keg 'n Tankard. Following their performances in Pretoria they performed in Hillbrow for the whole of October 1977 at the Chelsea Theatre. They were, however, through popular demand requested back by the Keg 'n Tankard for performances for another three months.

In the second half of 1978 the band, now with a fourth member John Moulang, was scheduled to perform in Port Elizabeth (now Gqeberha) at the Marine Hotel. After these performances, the band returned to East London and performed at Rhodes University in Grahamstown (now Makhanda) on 23 July 1978. Other notable performances include at the Charlton Cellar, Gonubie Farmers Hall, Boulevard Holiday Inn (Cape Town), Holiday Inn (Port Elizabeth) and Wagon Wheels Hotel (Durban).

The band struggled to record an album as Rod Dry stated, "we would rather not record than have our music buttered up as a commercial proposition." This was because the band found inspiration from immigrants or records that they could find, which created a unique, undefined and free music style. They, however, did record an album in the 1980s called Silver Creek Mountain Band through RAP Records that contains 16 singles. The Silver Creek Mountain band was also featured in the TV-series Sebastian Senior produced by Manie van Rensburg in 1978. and in a book called The Journey Man – A South African Reporter's Stories by Chris Marais.

From the 1980s onward until the present, particularly after Dennis Schultz left the band, the Silver Creek Mountain Band now led by Rod Dry has appointed more than 30 musicians to fill the band as members left. The group has continued to appoint members that have mastery over multiple instruments and musical genres and has become and still is one of the most unique bands in South African music history.

=== International Exposure ===
In 1978 they were asked to join as a supporting group for the British group Brotherhood of Man. This tour was promoted by the Quibell Brothers and featured performances in City Hall (Pretoria), Colosseum Theatre (Johannesburg), Three Arts Theatre (Cape Town), and Gqeberha among other places.

=== Personal life ===
In July 1977, Rod Dry and Roger Cummings appeared in court for allegations of possession of marijuana. They were, however, found not guilty, and the charges were dropped.

Archive

Silver Creek Mountain Band donated his archival material including photographs, vinyl records, letters and documents, to the Hidden Years Music Archive, preserved at the Documentation Centre for Music, Stellenbosch University in 2017.

== Past members ==
- Roger Cummings (Guitar, Fiddle, Mandolin, Sitar & Vocals)
- Martin Edwards (Banjo, Bass & Vocals)
- Dave Tarr (Violin, Viola, Guitar, Mandolin, Flute, Saxophone)
- Tin Whistles & Vocals)
- John Moulang (Guitar, Bongos, Congas & Vocals)
- Barrie Glenn (Guitar, Fiddle, Mandolin & Vocals)
- Iain McAlpine (Fiddle & Vocals)
- George Lotz (Guitar, Mandolin, Mouth-harp & Vocals)
- Stuart Kiddle (Guitar, Jew's Harp & Vocals)
- Matthijs (Thijs) Rührup (5-String Banjo, Guitar, Mandolin, Mouth-harp, Piano & Vocals)
- Lindsay Scott (Fiddle, Mandolin & Vocals)
- Dave Bekker (Peddle steel, Guitar & Vocals)
- Syd Wagner (Guitar)
- Kevin “Sticks” Sakke (Drums)
- Wimpie Rauch (Piano-accordion)
- “Drummer Dave” Lottering (Drums)
- Hennie Zeelie (Guitar & Vocals)
- “Cousin Hennie” Crous (Guitar & Piano-accordion)
- Mervyn Davis (Mandolin & Vocals)
- Peter Snibbe (Guitar & Vocals)
- Dean Potgieter (Guitar & Vocals)
- Piet Botha (Guitar, Piano & Vocals)
- Carnaby Roberts (Guitar, Mouth-harp, Kazoo & Vocals)
- Roy Burroughs (Drums)
- Helena Hettema (Vocals)
- Johnny Maritz (Drums & Percussion)
- Rina (Keyboards)
- Gerrit vd Merwe (Guitar, Mouth-harp & Vocals)
- Jean Philippe Fuss (Lead vocals & Guitar)
- Werner von Zweel (Guitar & Vocals)
- Carl Frayne (Guitar, Mandolin & Vocals)
- Oigen Ruetsche (Harmonica)

== Discography ==
Silver Creek Mountain Band produced an album through RAP Records called Silver Creek Mountain Band. It was performed by Rod Dry, Lindsay Scott (from Scotland), George Lotz, Stuart Kiddle and Matthijs (Thijs) Rührup (from the Netherlands).

Track Listing
No.	Title	Length
1.	"Look What They’ve Done To The Silver Creek"	2:52
2.	"Devil's Dream/Masons Apron"	2:27
3.	"Catfish John"	2:50
4.	"Detour"	2:58
5.	"Ricketts Horn Pipe/Boys Of Blue Hill"	2:38
6.	"Forget Me Not"	3:20
7.	"Teach Your Children"	2:30
8.	"Froggy Mountain Breakdown"	1:46
9.	"Mr. Bojangles"	4:22
10.	"Mrs. McCleods Reef"	2:22
11.	"Blue Train"	2:12
12.	"Resign Yourself To Me"	2:33
13.	"Blackberry Blossom/Dixie Hoedown"	3:58
14.	"Uncle Joe"	2:21
15.	"Wild Mountain Thyme"	3:29
