= Half Price =

South African punk rock band

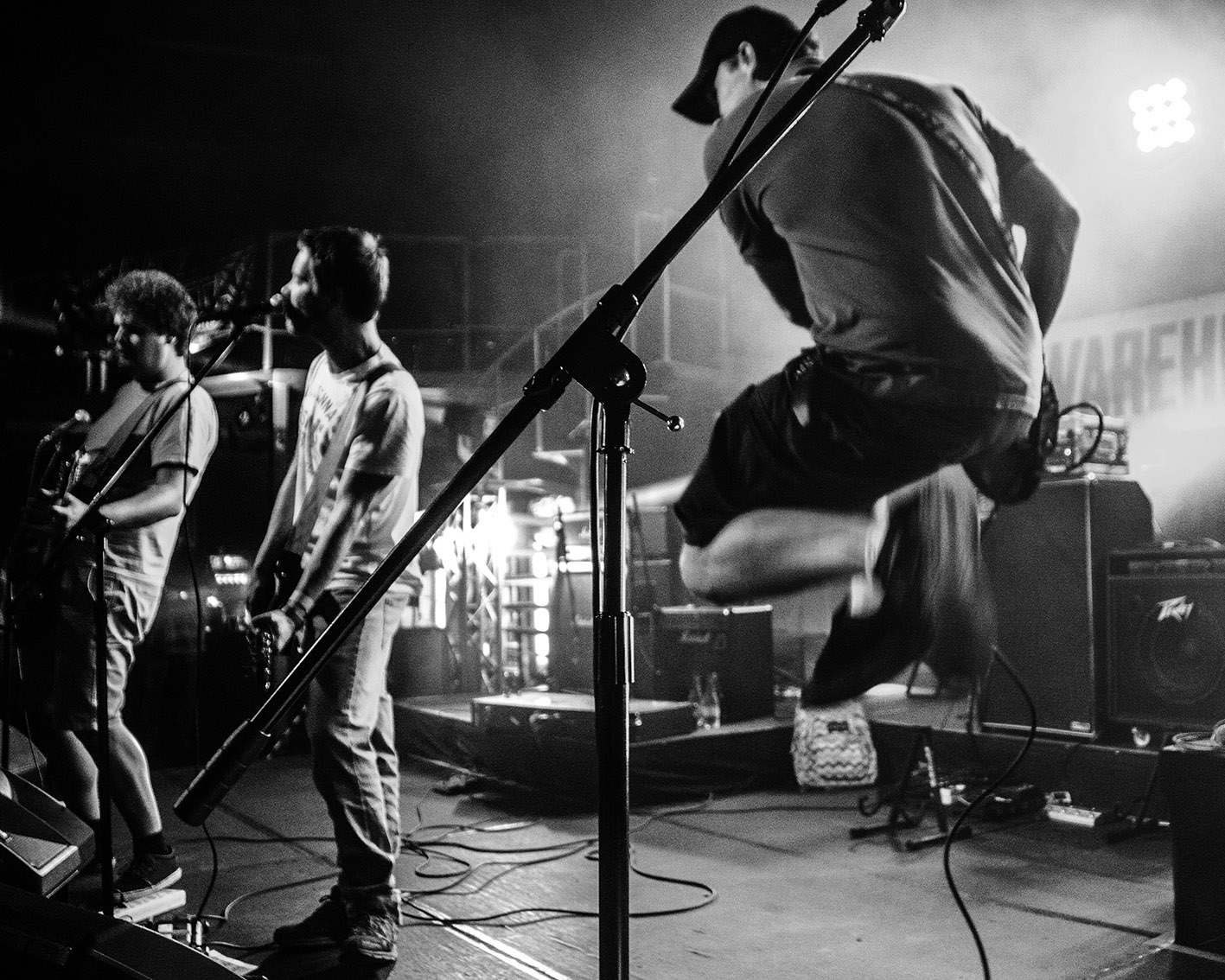

Background information
- Origin: Cape Town, South Africa
- Genres: Punk rock; Skate punk
- Years active: 2001–present
- Label: Punk Outlaw Records
- Members: Sober Pete aka Homo Erectus; The DFG; Emo Mawk; Kyle the Machine; Mister Willis
- Website: halfpriceband.co.za

Half Price is a punk rock band from Cape Town, South Africa established in 2001. They are identified by energetic performances and released 4 full-length albums, two EPs, a compilation album, two split albums, and a limited edition vinyl release since their inception. The band has always maintained a DIY ethos, remaining independent until 2016 when they became the first South African punk band to sign with an American digital record label, Punk Outlaw Records.

== History ==
Half Price was founded by Pete and The DFG in 2001 as a satirical punk rock outfit. They self-describe their style as trombone-fuelled non-profit party-punk, which is a mixture of punk rock, ska, reggae and a splash of hardcore with a focus on having fun rather than making money, while carrying a sarcastic leitmotif of music made for people that love to party. Half Price are notorious for their crazy stage antics, embracing the humor and reputation of the non-profit party-punk concept, while also talking a vocal stand against racism, sexism and other forms of discrimination.

They have played numerous shows and festivals around South Africa, as well as four tours in Europe. They toured Europe for the first time in 2005, and then in 2006, 2008, and 2013. Half Price have shared the stage with acts such as The Exploited, Mad Caddies, The Spermbirds, Leftöver Crack, and Antimaniax. In November 2017, Half Price were the supporting act for the Cape Town leg of the Alien Ant Farm South African tour.

In 2010, Half Price released a satirical song called "Soccer 2010" about the 2010 FIFA World Cup which was held in South Africa. Six years later, New York label Punk Outlaw Records released a compilation album of the band, titled Straight Outta South Africa. Following this, in 2018 the band released a split album with Alive at Midnight, another punk band from Cape Town.

After taking a ten-year break from international touring, the band returned to Europe together with Johannesburg punk band Mean Girls for nine shows including a performance at the world renowned Punk Rock Holiday festival in Slovenia in 2024. For the tour the bands released a joint split EP on major streaming services as well as on Cassette Tape, and CD. Building on this successful return to international touring, in 2025, the band embarked on its biggest tour since 2006 with seven shows in South Africa and 16 shows in Europe.

== Band members ==
- Sober Pete aka Homo Erectus: Main vocals & rhythm guitar
- The DFG: Bass & vocals
- Emo Mawk: Lead guitar & vocals
- Kyle the Machine: Drums
- Mister Matt Willis: Trombone & vocals

== Discography ==
=== Studio albums ===
- Taking Life Seriously (2004)
- Banned (2006)
- The Monotony of Monogamy (2010)
- Ska Daddy (2025)

=== Compilation albums ===
- Straight Outta South Africa (2016)

=== EPs ===
- Bush, Bin Laden & My Mom's Nought (2003)
- Programmed to Party (2013)

=== Split albums ===
- So Hard it Hurts (2018) - split album with Alive at Midnight
- Split Personalities (2024) - split EP with Mean Girls

=== Special Releases ===
- Learning to Fly (2025) - limited edition vinyl released in collobartion with Roastin' Records

=== Music videos ===
- Taking Life Seriously on YouTube
- 15 Years on YouTube
- Buy Your Own on YouTube
- Suicide Bomber on YouTube
- Still Playing Punk on YouTube
- So Hard It Hurts on YouTube
- The Forgotten Future on YouTube
