= The Rudimentals =

South African ska/reggae band

- Origin: Cape Town, South Africa
- Genres: Ska; Reggae
- Years active: 2000–present
- Labels: V-Labs/Rising Records/Independent
- Members: Lloyd 'King Labash' Muponda; Cotterell 'Khaos' Jop; Whosane Pangaea; Ross MacDonald; Simon Bates; Jodi Engelbrecht; Michael Levy; Giovanni Serci; Errol Strachan; Matt Willis; Benji De Kock
- Past members: Barry Clausen, Milandru Mapengo, Etienne Harris, Dirk Meerkotter, Duane Heydenrych, Teboes Maidza,, Kyle Gray, Clem Carr, Bonj Mpanza, Antonio Cencherle, Nikolai Atiros
- Website: http://www.therudimentals.com/

The Rudimentals are a nine-piece ska/reggae band from Cape Town, South Africa. The band's releases include two CDs, More Fire and Set It Proper, and a live DVD/CD combo of the 2007 Kirstenbosch Botanical Gardens Concert. More recently a new 5-song EP, Blaze Up The Fire was also released in November 2014, and a single track Bubbling for radio in February 2015. The band was previously signed to the United Kingdom-based Moon Ska World distribution label. The group is one of a handful of Cape Town reggae-influenced bands, and has been described as a South African institution in tourist guides and on websites.

== Career ==
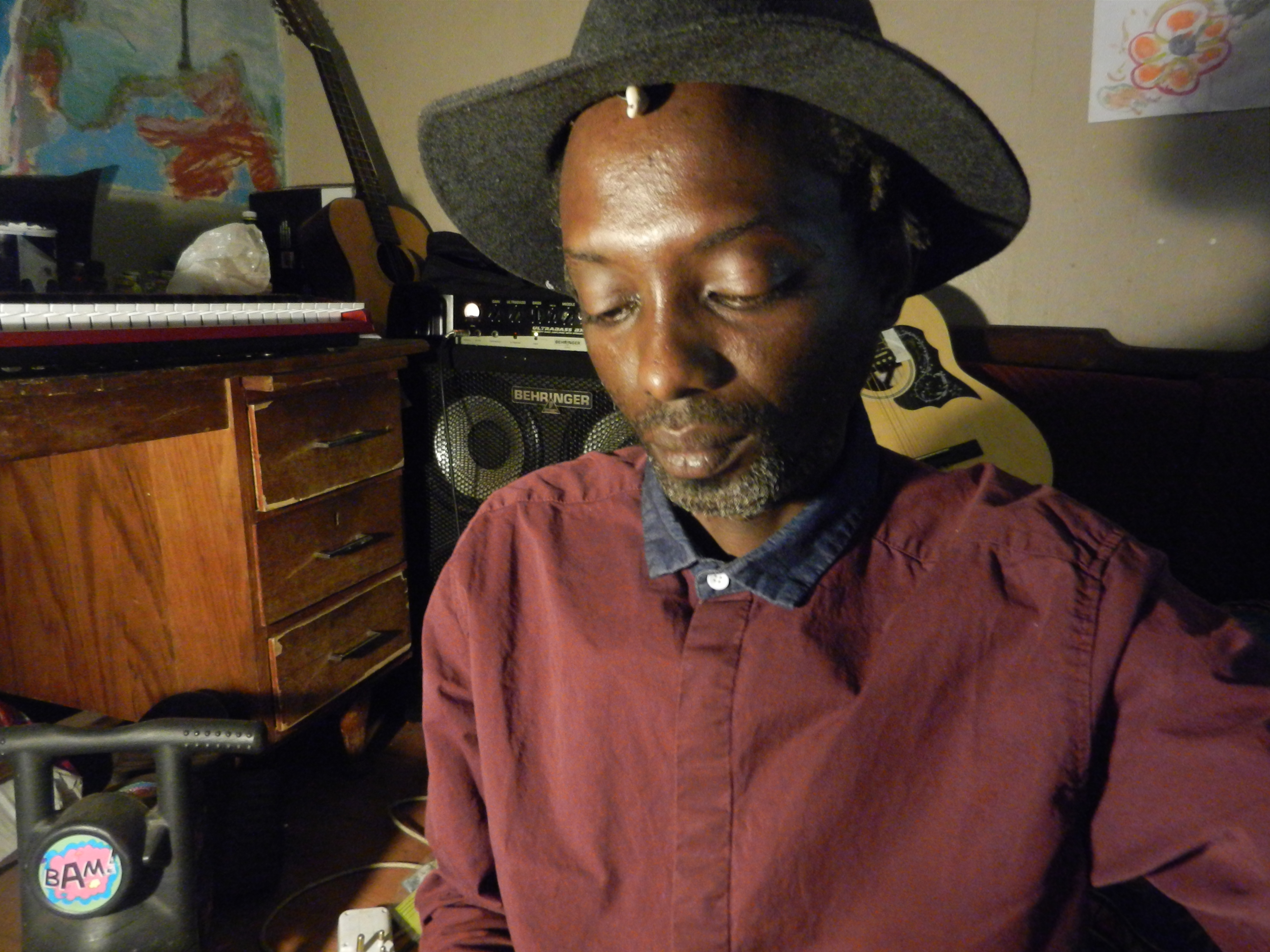
Milandru Mapengo, original keyboardist of The Rudimentals, a nine-piece ska/reggae band from Cape Town, South Africa, in the studio

The original members of the band were bassist Barry Clausen, guitarist Etienne Harris, drummer Duane Heydenreych and keyboardist Milandru Mapengo. It wasn't until they met with Zimbabwean showman Teboho (Teboes) Maidza that the band began to grow seriously. Teboes is known to have played alongside Andy Brown and Oliver Mtukudzi. The band subsequently took on a three-piece brass section, in the form of The University of Cape Town's Simon Bates on saxophone, Jody Engelbrecht on trumpet and Ross McDonald on trombone. Dirk Meerkotter replaced Milandru Mapengo on keys.

The band released its first CD, More Fire, in South Africa in October 2003, and the song "Noh TV" won a National Bronze Stone award for best music video in that same year. In 2004, Blunt Magazine designated the band "Best Reggae and Ska Band" in the country. In 2003, Michael Levy joined on lead guitar. Soon, Barry Clausen left, and six-times National Freestyle skateboarding champion Errol Strachan (AKA Bong) joined up on bass.

The band toured with UB40 in South Africa in July 2007, and has performed at the Cape Town Jazz Festival, Zimfest 08, and numerous other annual South African events and all the major festivals. The Rudimentals have also performed at concerts featuring: Mad Caddies, Joe Sample, Randy Crawford, Groove Armada, Violent Femmes, Johnny Clegg, Freshlyground, Lucky Dube, Vivian Jones, The Wailers, The UK/English Beat and Jimmy Eat World, and The Prodigy.

In 2007 the band released its second album entitled Set it Proper and two singles off the album reached number 1 in the South African best MP3 Awards, each running at top spot for longer than three months. The singles were "Radio Skaweto" and "London Sucks".

In 2014, the vocal section was beefed up with Jamaican born Dancehall vocalist and singer, Cotterell "Khaos" Jop, and famed Zimbabwean born Dancehall artist, Lloyd "King" Labash. Also in late 2014, The band released a 5-song EP entitled "Blaze Up the Fire" and the single "Sound Boy Killer" quickly rose to number 1 on the Nationally acclaimed 5FM Radio charts. The EP showcased a new musical direction and sound which included Dubstep, Drum and Bass, Hip-Hop and Dancehall.

== Current line-up ==
- Whosane Pangaea - lead vocals
- Cotterell "Khaos" Jop - vocals
- Matt Willis - trombone, backing vocals
- Simon Bates - saxophone
- Jody Engelbrecht - flugel, trumpet
- Gio Serci- drummer
- Michael "Doc Mike" Levy - lead guitar
- Benji De Kock - KeyBoards, Synth
- Errol 'Bong' Strachan - bass guitar
