= List of Afrikaans singers =

This is a list of notable singers who have performed in the Afrikaans language. Solo artists are alphabetised by their stage name or surname—whichever is more common. Choirs that sing in Afrikaans are also included in the list, but other music groups are listed in the "Music groups" section below.

The first major South African singers to record in Afrikaans were Ada Forrest and Annie Visser, in 1908.

== A ==
- Andriëtte
- Anke
- Fatheya Ahmed

== B ==
- Bok van Blerk
- Cristina Boshoff
- Piet Botha
- Bles Bridges
- Liza Brönner

== C ==
- Arno Carstens
- Chris Chameleon
- Mimi Coertse

== D ==
- Kurt Darren
- Izak Davel
- Al Debbo
- Coenie de Villiers
- Casper de Vries
- Ray Dylan

== E ==
- Erica Eloff
- Jurie Els
- Elvis Blue

== F ==
- Joanna Field
- Ada Forrest

== G ==
- Anton Goosen

== H ==
- Sonja Herholdt
- Steve Hofmeyr

== J ==
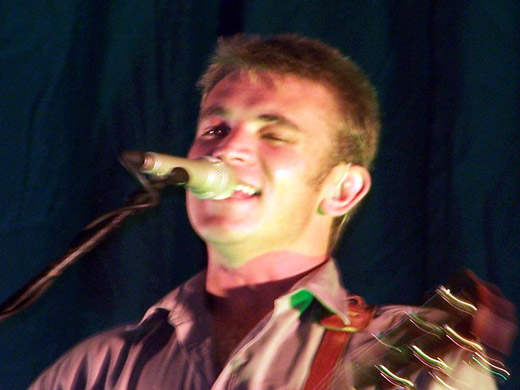
Theuns Jordaan

- Hennie Jacobs
- Fanie de Jager
- Lance James
- Watkin Tudor Jones
- Arno Jordaan
- Theuns Jordaan

== K ==
- Ada Cherry Kearton (married name of Ada Forrest)
- Johannes Kerkorrel
- Koos Kombuis
- Gé Korsten
- Karin Kortje
- David Kramer

== L ==
- Riku Lätti
- Patricia Lewis
- Nicholis Louw
- Stefan Ludik
- Laura Lynn
- Helmut Lotti

== N ==
- Nádine
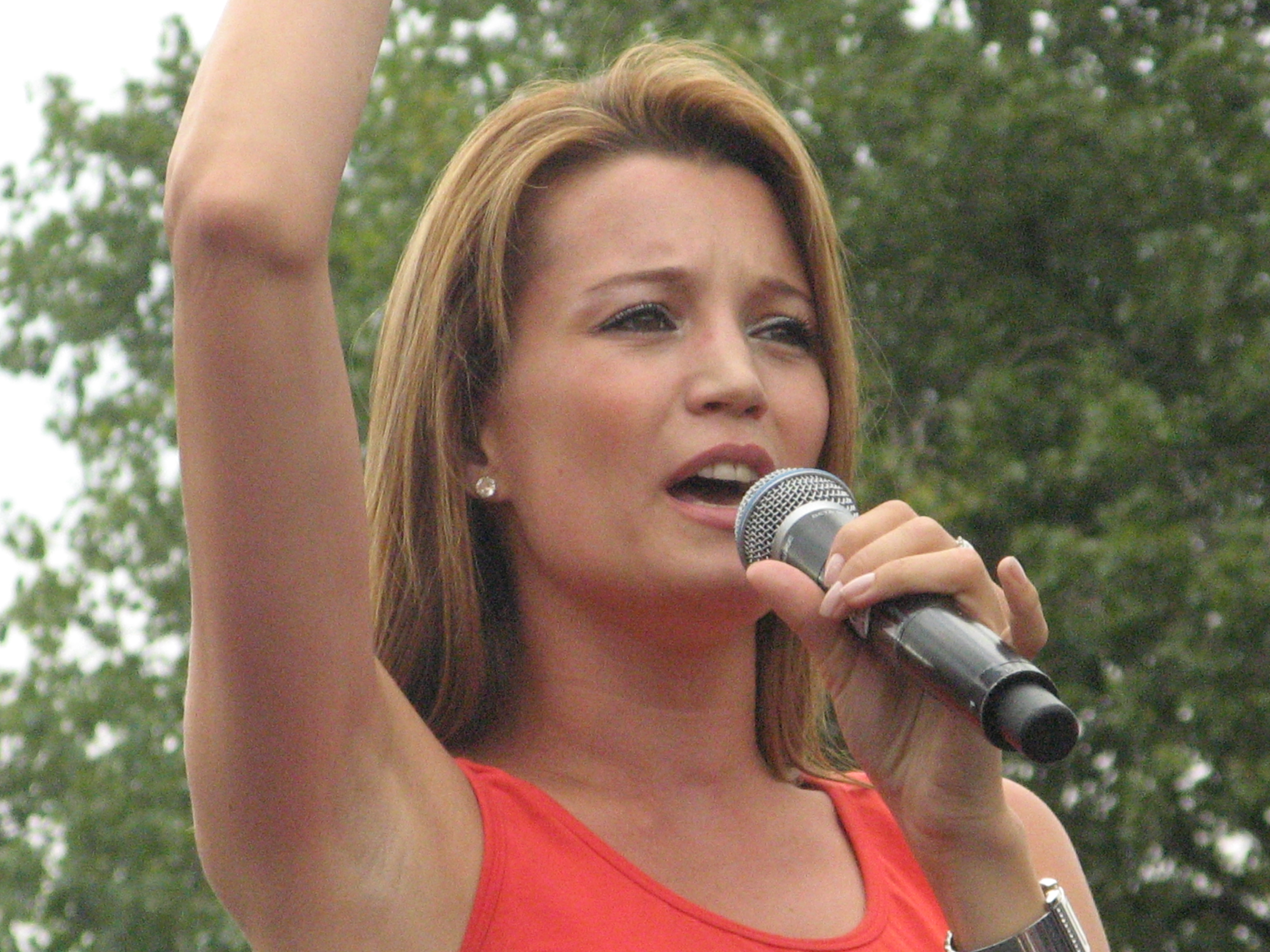
  Nádine in the Netherlands in 2009
- Nataniël
- Riana Nel
- Nianell

== O ==
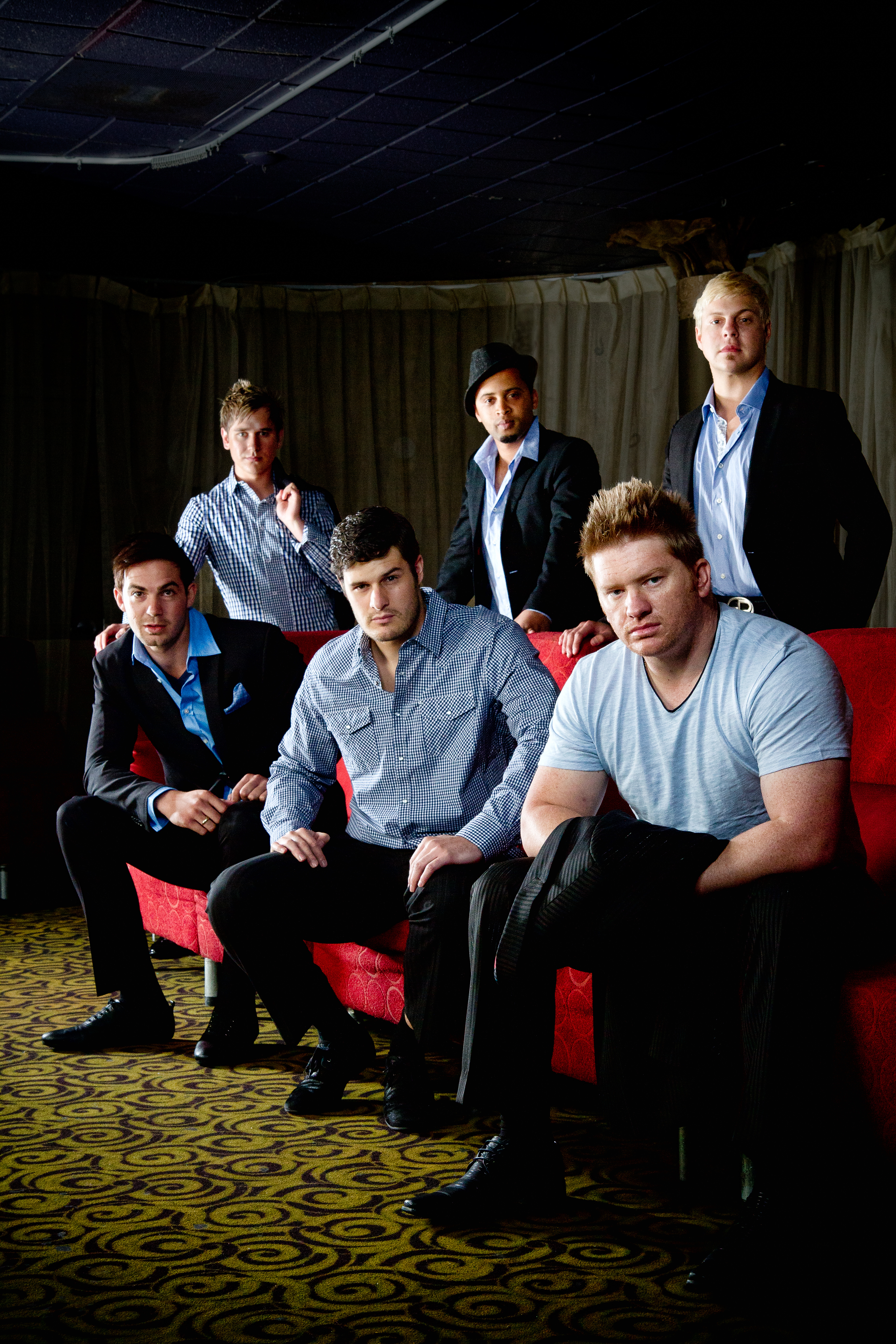
Overtone are an a cappella group from Johannesburg.

- Overtone

== P ==
- Jack Parow
- Brendan Peyper
- Juanita du Plessis
- Koos du Plessis
- Gert Potgieter

== R ==
- Laurika Rauch

== S ==
- Leon Schuster
- Snotkop
- Etienne Steyn
- Amanda Strydom
- Valiant Swart

== T ==
- Shaun Tait
- Adam Tas

== V ==
- Bobby van Jaarsveld

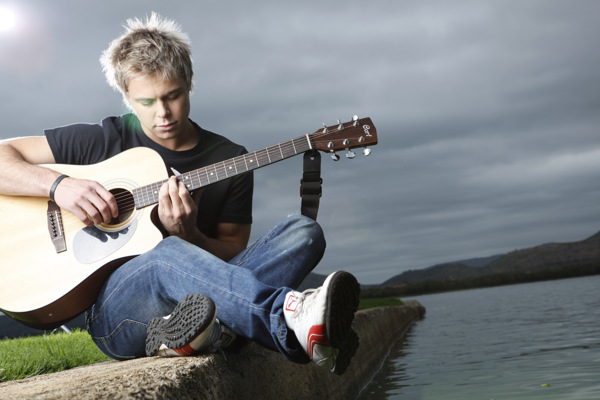
Bobby van Jaarsveld in 2009

- Piet van Wyk de Vries
- Yolandi Visser
- Amor Vittone
- Francois Van Coke; also the lead singer of punk rock bands Van Coke Kartel and Fokofpolisiekar

== W ==
- Willim Welsyn
- Robbie Wessels
- Heinz Winckler
- Dana Winner

== Z ==
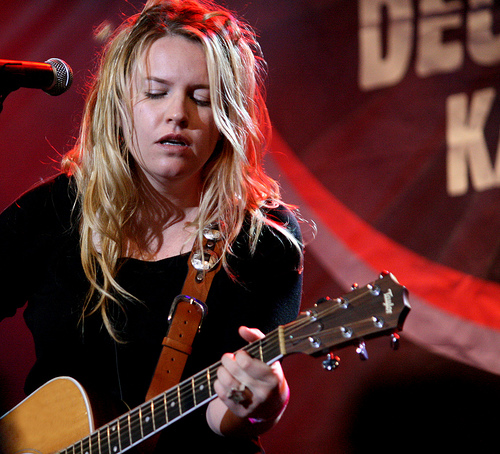
Karen Zoid performing on stage in 2009

- Karen Zoid

== Music groups that perform in Afrikaans ==
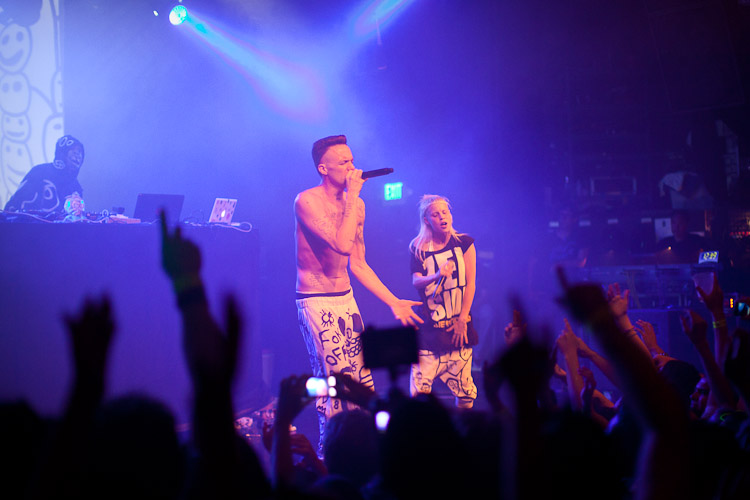
Die Antwoord performing in Los Angeles in 2010

- Die Antwoord
- Battery 9
- Fokofpolisiekar
- Foto na Dans
- Die Grafsteensangers
- Die Heuwels Fantasties
- Hi-5
- MaxNormal.TV
- Radio Kalahari Orkes
- Romanz
- Rooibaardt
- Straatligkinders
- Van Coke Kartel, a punk rock band in Cape Town
- Wonderboom

== See also ==
- List of Dutch musicians
- List of South African musicians
- Music of Namibia
- Music of the Netherlands
- Music of South Africa
