= Bles Bridges =

- Born: Lawrence John Gabriel Bridges; July 22, 1946
- Origin: Viljoensdrif; Free State
- Died: March 24, 2000 (aged 53) Bloemhof, North West Province
- Genres: Afrikaans/English/Country
- Years active: 1984-2000
- Label: EMI/Nolina/Brigadiers/BMG/Unika.

Bles Bridges (22 July 1946, in Viljoensdrif, Orange Free State – 24 March 2000, near Bloemhof, North West), born Lawrence John Gabriel Bridges, was a South African singer. He became known as Bles Bridges, as his Irish grandfather called him "Bles" (meaning "bald" in Afrikaans), due to his very thin hair from an early age.

Married to Leonie Bridges from 1969 until his death on 24 March 2000, he also had a long-term relationship with Marietjie van Heerden in the 90s.

In 1972, Bles and his then co-artist Mini van Heerden (1938-2018) made his debut with the album, Adios, My Skat. Bles debuted under the nickname Morné. He released his first solo album, Onbekende Weermagman (Unknown Military Man) in 1982. His professional career took off in 1984 with the release of his second album, Bles, which went gold in under a month (25,000 copies) and included Maggie, one of his better-known songs. The album had sold twice that by the time his third album was released. At the time of his death, Bles had sold more than 2.6 million albums (records and CDs). Up to 2016, he sold over 3 million records, making him the biggest-selling male singer in the Afrikaans Music industry.

Soon, Bles Bridges began alternating between Afrikaans and English language albums, to great acclaim. He also began working with Eurovision South Africa. In 2000, he began recording an album with his friends in the music industry. The first song - a duet with Patricia Lewis (and his last song as it turned out, as he died within a week of finishing it) - was "The First Kiss Goodnight" by Dennis East; it was recorded on 21 March 2000. His biggest hit was "Ruiter van die Windjie" (Rider of the Wind), which was released in 1986.

In the 1980s, he held a concert in support of the Volkshulpskema (People's Help Scheme) of the Afrikaner Weerstandsbeweging (Afrikaner Resistance Movement), a far-right paramilitary organisation, which raised R10,000.

He had cancer during the 1980s and gave generously to charity for cancer research after his recovery. His wife Leonie was his sound engineer and the composer and/or songwriter of most of his songs, including most of his biggest hits like "Maggie" and "I am the Eagle, You're the Wind".

It was his custom to hand out roses to some of the female audience members in the front row at his concerts.. This was the basis for a Leon Schuster skit in the hit movie, Oh Schucks... It's Schuster! (1989). In the skit, Shuster, dressed as an Afrikaner lady and became irate when Bridges refused to give her a rose. Chaos ensued.

His career highlight was when he performed to a sold-out 8,000-seater Super Bowl at Sun City, five times on one weekend, becoming the first and only artist to do so as feature artist on 14 and 15 November 1987. He managed to draw a bigger crowd than Frank Sinatra did when he opened the Super Bowl in 1982.

Bles died in a motorcar accident on 24 March 2000, leaving behind his wife, Leonie, and children Sunette and Victor. More than 20,000 mourners turned up for his funeral.

On 26 January 2020, Bles was inaugurated as a living legend in the South African Legends Museum. He was one of 20 legends of whom a bust was also made.

Albums & Cd's Released.

- Morne en Marie Sing - 1972
- Onbekende Weermagman - 1982
- Bles - 1984
- Uit die Boonste Rakke - 1985
- Vir een en Almal - 1986
- I Am the Eagle, You're the Wind - 1986
- Reik na die Sterre - 1987
- Fight For Love - 1987
- Laat My Lewe, Laat My Liefhê - 1988
- Ons Eerste Ontmoeting - 1989
- Nog 'n Nuwe Dag - 1989
- The Devil and the Song - 1989
- Let Me Love You - 1990
- Back on My Feet Again - 1991
- Soos Nooit Tevore - 1992
- Am I That Easy To Forget - 1993
- One Dance With You - 1994
- Grootste Treffers - 1994
- Sproetjies Kom Terug - 1995
- Love and Roses - My Greatest Hits - 1996
- Die Hart Van My Moeder - 1997
- Sweef Soos 'n Arend - 1998
- Classics My Way - 1998
- Country My Way - 1999
- Goue & Platinum Treffers Deur Die Jare Heen - 2000
- Môre Bring 'n Nuwe Dag - 2000
- Goue & Platinum Treffers Deur Die Jare Heen (Vol II) - 2000 (released 26 September 2000)
- Net Vir Jou (10 Jaar Huldeblyk) - 2010
- Die Bekroonde Kunstenaas - 2011

== Released videos ==
- In Search of Love
- Op Toer Met Bles (On Tour with Bles)

== Movie ==
He starred in a 1989 movie called The Devil and the Song.
