= Fanie de Jager =

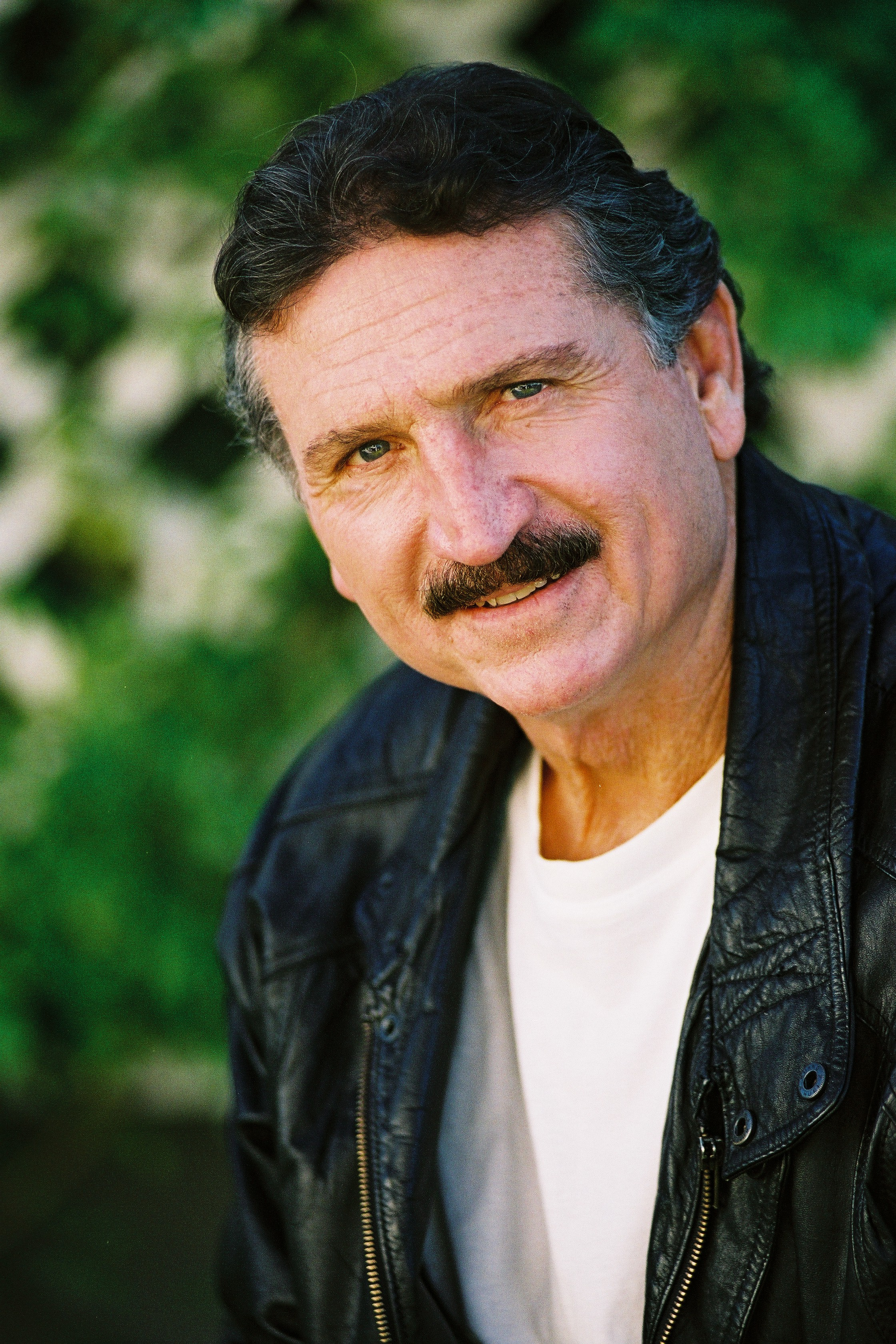
- de Jager in Cape Town, South Africa in 2010

Background information
- Born: 8 April 1949 (age 76); Newcastle, KwaZulu-Natal, South Africa
- Genres: Classical, opera
- Occupation: Singer
- Years active: 1970–present
- Labels: Braeview
- Website: english.faniedejager.co.za

Fanie de Jager (born 8 April 1949) is a South African operatic tenor and singer of light classical music.

== Early life ==
Fanie de Jager was born to Christiaan Lodevicus and Frederika Stefina de Jager in Newcastle, KwaZulu-Natal, South Africa. He completed his schooling in Pretoria in Gauteng, the former Transvaal. After his schooling, he studied classical music and singing from the age of 20 with maestro Albrecht Lewald and later the well known George Kok. During this time he joined the Performing Arts Council of Transvaal (PACT), where he performed as either the lead or understudy to the lead in the following operas and operettas: Aida, The Marriage of Figaro, La bohème, Rigoletto, La traviata, The Barber of Seville, The Merry Widow, Don Pasquale and Il matrimonio segreto. As guest artist for other theatres and opera houses, he appeared as the leading tenor in Gianni Schicchi, Rita, La traviata, Der Wildschütz and Ariadne auf Naxos. As a young tenor he performed many lunch hour concerts in Pretoria and the surrounding area, singing light classical music and songs from musicals.

== Recording career ==
My Sentimental Soul, de Jager's debut album, was launched in 2000 and reached gold status in South Africa. This album is known as one of Fanie's most loved amongst his fans, including songs in English, Italian, Afrikaans and Spanish. Afrikaanse Juwele (meaning "Afrikaans jewels"), de Jager's fourth album, reached gold status within two months and became the top-selling Afrikaans album for six consecutive weeks. It also featured in the South African Top 20, an international hit parade, during the same period. Fanie de Jager's popularity grew, and he was invited to appear on various South African television shows, such as Musiekforum, Platepraatjies, Maak 'n Las and Teletreffers. He appeared three times on the most popular show currently, Noot vir Noot (meaning 'Note for Note'), an Afrikaans musical quiz presented by Johan Stemmet. Over the past 10 years he has travelled throughout South Africa, performing more than 350 solo concerts.

In 2007, de Jager released an album, My Classical Soul. It includes a world-class collection of opera and operetta arias and duets with South African soprano Michelle Veenemans. It also includes the classical piece "Con Te Partiro" ("Time to Say Goodbye"). His latest album is Classics Forever.

As of 2012 de Jager is focussing on performing internationally, starting with Europe. Videos of his renditions of the Neapolitan song "'O sole mio" and the operatic aria "La donna è mobile" were aired by Classic FM TV in the UK in 2007. These videos were included in their daily playlist for some time, where he featured amongst artists such as Plácido Domingo, Andrea Bocelli, Katherine Jenkins, Sarah Brightman, Josh Groban, and André Rieu.

== Albums ==
- My Sentimental Soul (2000)
- Gloria Deo (2001)
- My Sentimental Soul – Vol 2 (2002)
- Afrikaanse Juwele (Afrikaans, 2004)
- From the Heart (2004)
- Sien Jou Weer (Afrikaans, 2005)
- My Classical Soul (2006)
- Fanie Sing Gé Korsten Treffers (Afrikaans, 2007)
- Classics Forever (2009)

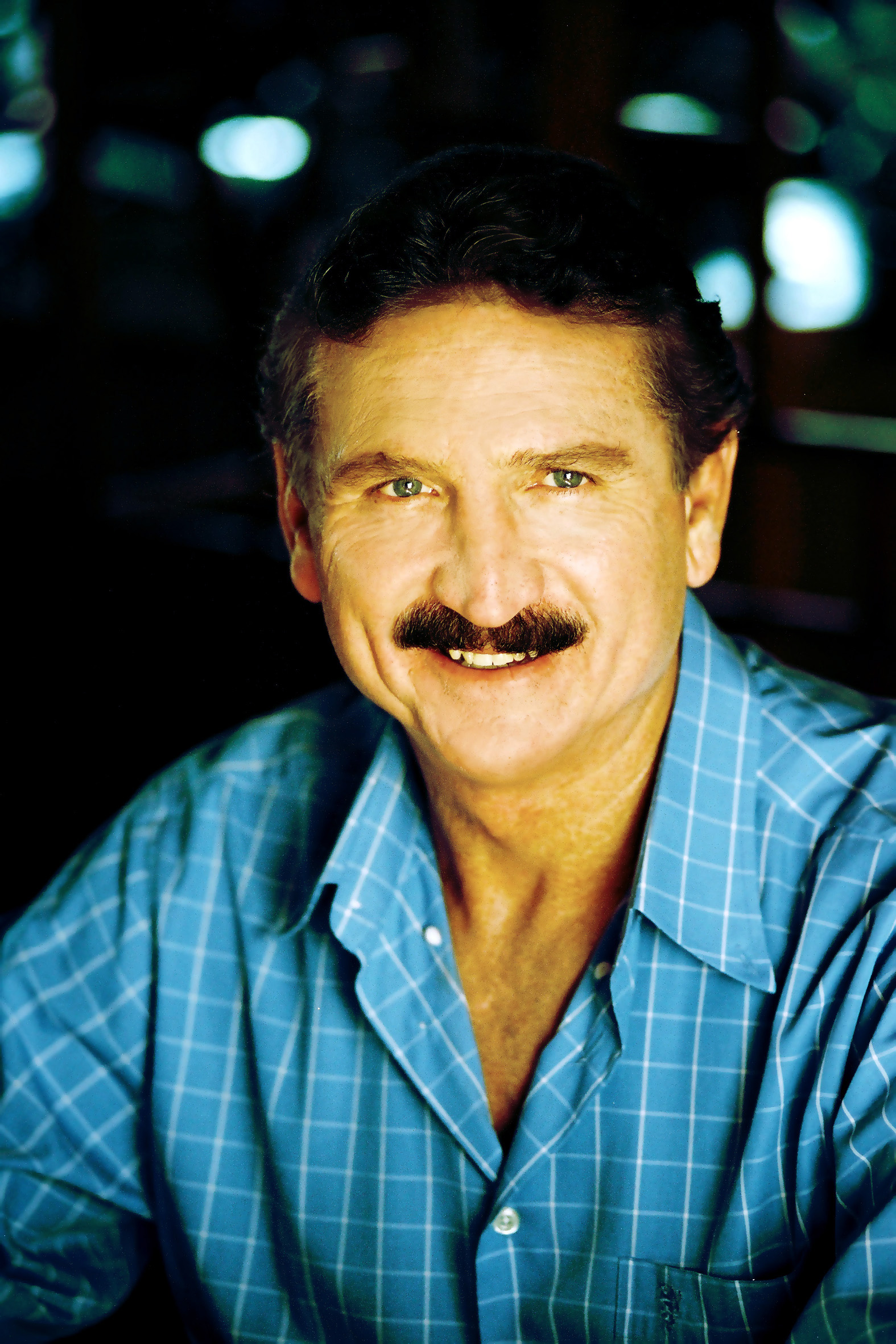
de Jager in 2011

== See also ==
- List of Afrikaans singers
- List of South African musicians
- Music of South Africa
