= Gérard Korsten =

Austrian conductor

Gérard Korsten (born 1960) is an Austrian musician and conductor.

== Life ==
Born in Pretoria, Korsten studied violin at the Curtis Institute of Music in Philadelphia with Ivan Galamian as well as in Salzburg with Sándor Végh. He was initially concertmaster of the Camerata Salzburg, and in 1987 took up the post of concertmaster with the Chamber Orchestra of Europe for nine years. Engagements followed as music director at the Teatro Lirico di Cagliari (Sardinia), music director of the London Mozart Players, chief conductor in Uppsala and at the Opera house in Pretoria, and as chief conductor of the Symphony Orchestra Vorarlberg in Bregenz.

Korsten is a jury member of the Internationaler Musikwettbewerb Pacem in Terris.

His father was South African tenor singer Gé Korsten.

== Recordings ==
as conductor

- 2006: Mozart: Le Nozze di Figaro, Teatro alla Scala, RaiCultura and Raitrade
- 2011: Richard Strauss: The Egyptian Helena, Dynamic 374/1-2
- 2010: Lehár: Die Lustige Witwe, Virgin Classics 96136
- 2008: Donizetti: Lucia Di Lammermoor, Dynamic 576/1-2
- 2004: Donizetti: Don Pasquale, Tdk USOPDP
- 1999: Crusell: Clarinet Concertos, Uppsala Co, Naxos 8554144
