= Roosevelt in Africa =

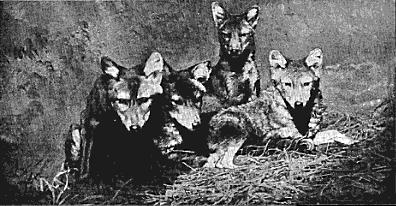
- A group of golden wolves from the film
- Directed by: Cherry Kearton
- Starring: Theodore Roosevelt
- Release date: April 18, 1910
- Country: United States
- Languages: Silent film English intertitles

Roosevelt in Africa is a film by Cherry Kearton, released in 1910. It is a documentary about the Smithsonian–Roosevelt African Expedition, featuring Theodore Roosevelt in Africa. It is shot in silent black and white.

One of the biggest headline-grabbing stories of 1910 was former president Theodore Roosevelt's safari into Africa. Landing in Mombasa in 1909, Roosevelt spent months in the wilds of East Africa, hunting big game in parts of what are now Kenya and Uganda.

For some of this journey, he was accompanied by famed British bird-and-animal photographer Cherry Kearton, who shot wildlife and native scenes with a hand-cranked motion picture camera. Among the scenes captured by Kearton's camera were a number of Maasai gatherings and dances – although the Maasai were incorrectly identified in the film's slates as "Zulus".

Quick to cash in on the media frenzy, the Selig Polyscope Company of Chicago released a fake documentary that it had shot at its own California game preserve, using a lookalike actor as a stand-in for Roosevelt when necessary.

Motion Picture Patents Company, using Pathé as its distribution arm, responded by releasing the authentic Kearton footage under the title Roosevelt in Africa.

Kearton had dreamed of filming an African lion, but was unable to do so during the Roosevelt voyage. The fake Selig film did feature a lion – a tamed aged lion.
