= Willim Welsyn =

South African singer-songwriter, filmmaker and podcaster

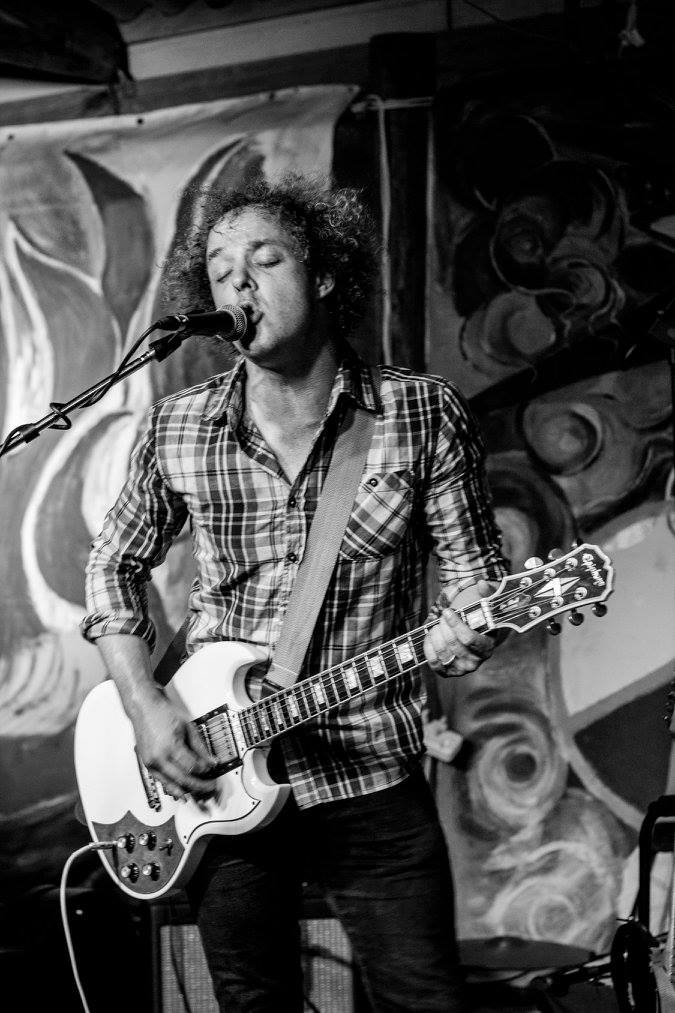
- Willim Welsyn performing at Zeegunst, Vleesbaai

Background information
- Also known as: William Welfare
- Born: John William F. Barnard; 17 September 1984 (age 41); Oudtshoorn, Western Cape, South Africa
- Origin: Ladismith, Western Cape
- Genres: Rock, folk, sunshine rock
- Occupations: Singer-songwriter, guitarist, bassist, podcaster
- Years active: 2002–present
- Labels: Next, Welfare
- Member of: Willim Welsyn en die Sunrise Toffies
- Website: www.williamwelfare.com

Willim Welsyn aka William Welfare (born William Barnard, 17 September 1984), is a South African rock singer-songwriter, filmmaker and an award-winning podcaster originally from Ladismith in the Western Cape. He is better known as the lead singer and guitarist for the Afrikaans Rock band, Willim Welsyn en die Sunrise Toffies and as former photographer, features writer and podcast host for the South African Rolling Stone magazine and for his weekly Afrikaans podcast show WAT Met Willim Welsyn Podcast.

== History ==
Willim Welsyn recorded his first self-titled solo EP in 2002 at the age of 17. In 2004 he recorded his first full-length solo album, Feromoon Rose. In the same year Welsyn met up with Panna Dekker (bass guitar) and Etienne Nel (drums) during a SABC 2 television interview where Welsyn asked Dekker and Nel to pose as his backing band for a promotional music video clip that would air with the initial interview. After the interview they formed Willim Welsyn en die Sunrise Toffies and recorded their first full-length album, Buikspraak in 2005.

Willim Welsyn en die Sunrise Toffies started touring in South Africa and shot two music videos for the songs, "Toastersport" and "Coca Cola Sunrise" for the then popular MK (channel). Dekker left the band soon hereafter. For three months Welsyn and Nel performed as a two-piece band, when Welsyn approached a bass guitar player from Jeffreys Bay, Gerhard Grobler, to join the band. In 2007 they recorded their second full-length album, Kompos en Kraai. Shortly after the Kompos en Kraai recording they signed a record deal with Next Music. Shortly after the release of Kompos en Kraai they released two music videos from the album, "Soos ’n Skoolhoof" en "Die mooiste van dit alles".

In 2008 drummer Etienne Nel was involved in a serious car accident in Stellenbosch. He suffered multiple injuries and was temporarily replaced by Tim Rankin, the sound engineer who worked on Kompos en Kraai and the drummer for the Cape Town-based band, Bed on Bricks. In the same year Welsyn recorded his second full-length solo album, Maanplaas, with Schalk van der Merwe, also from Bed Bricks, on bass guitar and Tim Rankin on drums. Van der Merwe also produced the album. Maanplaas's sound differed from Willim Welsyn en die Sunrise Toffies's previous high-paced rock albums, taking a more relaxed, country and folk direction.

In 2009 Welsyn enrolled at Stellenbosch University, Grobler enrolled at the Cape Audio College and Nel started working full-time. Willim Welsyn en die Sunrise Toffies still kept performing occasional live shows, while Welsyn also pursued his solo career.

In 2010 Grobler travelled to Thailand and was replaced by bassist Louis Esterhuizen, who was previously the bassist and guitarist of Rooibaardt. In September 2010 Welsyn recorded his third full-length solo album, Smeer die Weerlig, with Nel on drums, Jo Ellis on organ and piano and Welsyn on guitar, vocals and bass guitar. Smeer die Weerlig was produced by Jo Ellis, who also produced Welsyn's first two albums and Willim Welsyn en die Sunrise Toffies's first album.

== Music style ==
In a 2014 review of William Welfare's Shunt author Annie Klopper noted: "As an Afrikaans rocker Welsyn proved that he's not a Fokofpolisiekar-wannebe that can only play two false chords on the guitar. His music is always without a touch of pretentiousness and his lyrics are well-thought-out."

== Rolling Stone South Africa ==
In 2012 Welsyn graduated from the University of Stellenbosch with a bachelor's degree in Humanities and then started working full-time at the South African Rolling Stone magazine as online editor, features writer and photographer.

In March 2013 Welsyn launched the Rolling Stone SA podcast show on www.rollingstone.co.za which he produced and co-hosted with RS editor in chief, Miles Keylock and RS digital editor, Anton Marshall. The podcast show featured a mixture of in-depth conversations, interviews, previews of upcoming feature articles and discussions of relevant topics of the day.

== William Welfare ==
In September 2013 Willim Welsyn changed his name to William Welfare (an English translation) for his first upcoming English album set to be released in 2014. "4 Cups of Dust" is the first official single and video by William Welfare. The video sees Welfare and drummer Kyle Gray recording the track live at Blooroom Studios in Ladismith and then traveling to the Oppikoppi Bewilderbeast 2013 Festival.

The footage was shot by Welfare and Gray on a GoPro knock-off camera while they were both covering the festival for Rolling Stone SA Magazine in August 2013. Welfare interviewed most of the artists seen in the video during the festival. Some of these artists include Chino Moreno from Deftones, Koos Kombuis, Black Cat Bones, Bittereinder, Shadowclub, Jack Parow and Tumi Molekane from Tumi and The Volume.

In 2014 Welfare released Shunt on 180g vinyl via Valve House Music and Publishing.

== WAT Met Willim Welsyn Podcast ==
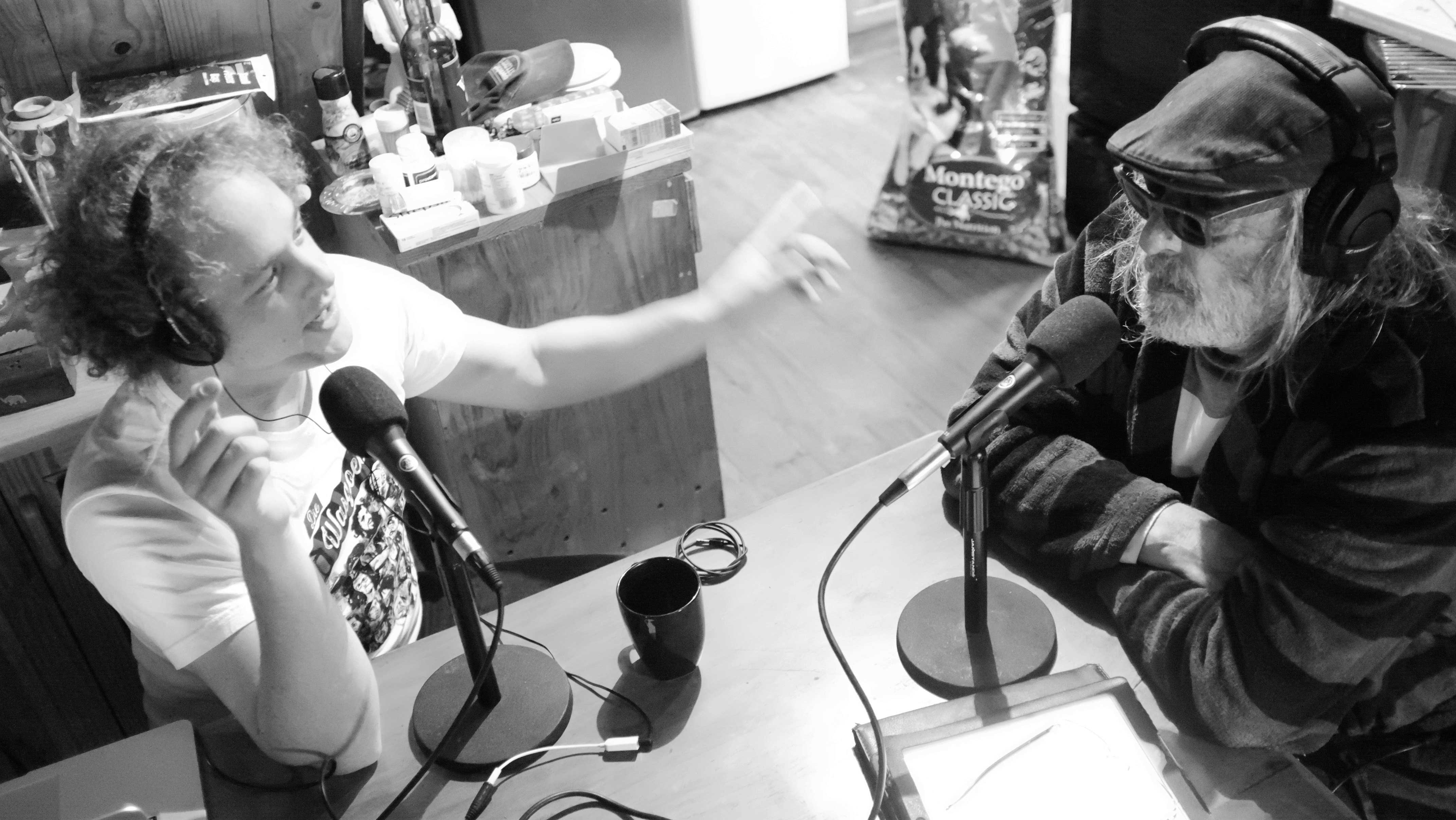
Willim Welsyn interviewing Anton Goosen on his WAT Podcast show.

After Rolling Stone South Africa magazine closed its doors in 2014, Welsyn started a weekly Afrikaans podcast show called 'WAT Met Willim Welsyn'. Released on Thursdays, the show features interviews with fellow musicians and legendary South African artists, writers and comedians. On 8 April 2016, after releasing 51 episodes, WAT Met Willim Welsyn Podcast became the first Afrikaans podcast show to reach the number 1 position on iTunes South Africa's podcast charts in the Performing Arts category. On 9 March 2017 Welsyn published the 99th episode of the WAT Podcast with RSG radio host Izak du Plessis as guest. On the intro of the episode Welsyn announced to his listeners that he's in the process of finalizing a new solo album called Blitzkriek, the album would see Welsyn return to his Afrikaans rock roots.

On 16 March 2017 Welsyn published the 100th episode of the WAT Podcast where he cold called regular listeners and fans of the show asking them how and when they listen to the show and what their favorite episodes were.

On 2 March 2018 Welsyn published the 150th episode of the WAT Podcast titled "Behind The Scenes & Cheers Vir Eers" where he answered a few fan questions, shared some behind the scenes trivia about the show and announced that he would be taking a break from the show for a few months. Welsyn explained that the weekly production of show started to become very labour-intensive and that he needed some time to clear his head before returning to the show.

He also mentioned that if you were to listen to all 150 episodes back-to-back that it would take you 9 days in total to complete.

On 12 April 2018, while still on hiatus, Welsyn got nominated for an ATKV Mediaveertjie (Media Feather) Award in the "Luister" (Listen) radio category for Best Presenter or Interviewer of a Magazine Programme. On 11 May 2018 Welsyn made history by becoming the first independent, self-funded South African podcaster to win an award in this category ruled by personalities from terrestrial radio stations.

== Awards and nominations ==
Award	Year	Recipient	Nomination	Result
South African Music Awards	2009	Kompos en Kraai (Willim Welsyn en die Sunrise Toffies)	Best Afrikaans Rock Album	Nominated
South African Music Awards	2010	Maanplaas (Willim Welsyn)	Best Alternative Afrikaans Album	Nominated
Huisgenoot Tempo	2010	Maanplaas (Willim Welsyn)	Beste Kopskuif Album	Won
Rapport Vonk	2010	Maanplaas (Willim Welsyn)	Best Alternative Album	Nominated
Huisgenoot Tempo	2011	Smeer Die Weerlig (Willim Welsyn)	Best Rock Album	Nominated
Huisgenoot Tempo	2011	"FRIEK YT!" (Willim Welsyn)	Best Alternative Music Video	Nominated
Ghoema Music Awards	2018	Blitzkriek (Willim Welsyn)	Best Rock Album	Nominated
Ghoema Music Awards	2018	Willim Welsyn	Favourite Male Artist	Nominated
ATKV Mediaveertjie (Luister)	2018	Willim Welsyn (WAT met Willim Welsyn Podcast)	Best Presenter or Interviewer of a Magazine Programme	Won
South African Music Awards	2018	Blitzkriek (Willim Welsyn)	Best Rock Album	Nominated

== Discography ==
- Willim Welsyn – Willim Welsyn EP 2002
- Willim Welsyn – Feromoon Rose 2004
- Willim Welsyn en die Sunrise Toffies – Buikspraak 2005
- Willim Welsyn en die Sunrise Toffies – Kompos en Kraai 2007
- Willim Welsyn – Maanplaas 2009
- Willim Welsyn – Smeer die Weerlig 2010
- William Welfare – Shunt 2014
- Willim Welsyn – Blitzkriek 2017

== Filmography ==
- "Zeegunst: By Invite Only" – Documentary 2014

In 2014 Welsyn got commissioned to shoot a behind-the-scenes video of a private music festival. During post production the video began to take the shape as a documentary. Valve House Music and Publishing decided to release the film on DVD. Hidden among the South African dunes of Vlees Bay and Fransmanshoek's nature reserve and conservation area you'll find the private holiday property of the four Hanekom brothers named Zeegunst. The documentary investigates the four Hanekom brothers’ logistical building blocks and motives for hosting one of the most secretive new year's festivals in the country. With interviews and live recordings of some of the most legendary local fringe bands and artists like Piet Botha, Akkedis, The Black Cat Bones, Albert Frost, Gerald Clark, Ann Jangle, William Welfare, Southern Gypsey Queen en Dirk Ace of the Voëlvry movement – "Zeegunst" tells the underground story of one family's ambitious efforts to begin the new year on a high note.
