= Leonie =

- Pronunciation: English: /ˈliːəni, liˈoʊni/ LEE-ə-nee, lee-OH-nee; French: [leɔni]
- Gender: Female

Origin
- Meaning: "lioness"

Other names
- Related names: Leon (masculine)

Leonie or (in French) Léonie or (in German) Leonie or in Arabic liuni is a Latin-origin feminine given name meaning "lioness", from the masculine personal name Leon (meaning "lion"). It is rare as a surname.

== People ==
People with the name or its variants include:

- Léonie Abo (born 1945), Bambunda author
- Léonie Adams (1899–1988), American poet
- Leonie Archer, British academic and author
- Leonie Benesch, German actress
- Leonie Bennett (born 1993), Dutch cricketer
- Leonie ter Braak (born 1980), Dutch actress and television presenter
- Leonie Brinkema (born 1944), American judge
- Leonie Bronkalla (born 1996), German politician
- Leonie Burke, midwife
- Léonie Duquet (1916–1977), French nun
- Leonie Elliott (born 1988), British actress
- Leonie Fiebig (born 1990), German bobsledder
- Leonie Forbes (1937-2022), Jamaican actress, broadcaster and producer
- Leonie Frieda (born 1956), Swedish-born former model, translator, and writer
- Léonie Gilmour (1872–1933), American educator, editor, and journalist
- Leonie Greiner (born 2002), German singer
- Leonie Hanne, German fashion blogger
- Léonie Horstmann (1898–1954), German writer
- Leonie Huddy, Australian-American political scientist
- Leonie Joubert, South African science writer
- Leonie Kluwig (born 1998), German bobsledder
- Leonie Krail (born 1986), Swiss ice dancer
- Leonie Kramer (1924-2016), Australian academic, educator and professor
- Leonie Maier (born 1992), German footballer
- Myriam Léonie Mani (born 1977), Cameroonian runner
- Léonie Martin (1903-1941), French nun
- Léonie Jeanne Razet (1884–1950), Marie Curie's secretary at the Radium Institute in Paris.
- Leonie Rysanek (1926–1998), Austrian dramatic soprano
- Leonie Saint (born 1986), German pornographic actress
- Leonie Sandercock (born 1949), Australian academic
- Leonie Short (born 1956), Australian politician
- Leonie Swann (born 1975), nom de plume of a German crime writer
- Leonie Maria Walter (born 2004), German biathlete

== Fictional characters ==
- Leonie Pinelli, a character from Fire Emblem: Three Houses
- Aunt Léonie, a character from In Search of Lost Time (À la recherche du temps perdu), novel written by Marcel Proust (1871-1922)

== See also ==
- Leonie (film), a 2010 film
- Leon (disambiguation)
