= Jurie Els =

South African singer

- Occupations: Music producer, singer
- Instrument: Vocals
- Spouse: Hestrie Cloete (m. 2005)

Jurie Els is a South African singer with a great number of albums and singles to his credit. He is owner of Stetson Music. Between 1994 and 2003, he was an artist and music producer with Sony, Johannesburg, South Africa.

== Early life and songwriting ==
Els started singing professionally in 1994 after winning the popular South African TV quiz programme Noot vir Noot in 1991. Since 1984, Els has written lyrics for over 600 songs recorded by more than 50 South African artists, including Sonja Herholdt, Rina Hugo, Gé Korsten, Patricia Lewis and Bobby Angel, Carike Keuzenkamp, Bobby Angel, Robbie Klay, OTH, Joanna Field, Nadine and Patricia Lewis—establishing him as one of the most prolific songwriters in Afrikaans popular music. He has to date 37 CD and DVD releases and total sales of over half a million units. Most of his albums were released on BMG (later Sony BMG), EMI and Universal Music. Two of his albums (Vat-Vat and Duet met Patricia Lewis) have gone platinum and five gold as a recording artist. He has also won many awards as music producer and songwriter.

== Personal life ==
In 2005 Els married the high jump world champion Hestrie Cloete. Their daughter Chrizette was born in 2006 and their son Jason John in 2008.

Els was involved in a high profile court case after ex child star singer Robbie Klay in 2008 alleged sexual molestation by Els when Klay was between 11 and 16. The allegations first appeared in Beeld in February 2008. The Pretoria High Court trying the case found the evidence insufficient, Judge Chris Eksteen stating that Klay was a "very poor witness who misled and deceived the court and had a money motive". Klay's claims were dismissed in December 2009 acquitting Els on all charges of sexual molestation. Earlier the Supreme Court had ordered a ban on publication of details of the alleged incidents. Major media outlets Huisgenoot, You and Media24, defying the court's publication ban, were successfully sued by Els and eventually sanctioned and fined.

Els went on to release eight more albums/greatest hit compilations after the 2009 court case. Klay left South Africa and now lives in Los Angeles.

Els and his family fled to New Zealand in March 2010 after severe public backlash against him after the court case and they now live in Silverdale, Auckland on the North Island. Els retired from the music business in 2016 and now owns a small company (Retro Records) that buys and sells vinyl records.

Hestrie, his wife, is a store manager at a popular women’s sport wear store in Albany Mall. The family owned three properties in the Auckland area and spent a few years developing some land outside the historical village of Puhoi which Els is believed to have bought after a final court case/settlement.

=== Autobiography ===
In September 2010, Els published his memoir Ver van vrede – My Volle Verhaal in which he recounts his upbringing in Vrede, his rise in the Afrikaans music industry and his side of the Robbie Klay controversy.

=== Legal battles ===
On 18 February 2010, Acting Judge Jan Hiemstra in the North Gauteng High Court dismissed a R 500 000 defamation suit brought by Robbie Klay’s mother against Els—ruling that no evidence of defamation existed and upholding the earlier December 2009 acquittal on molestation charges.

== Discography ==
Jurie Els albums / DVDs and "sell-thru" videos:

- 1994: Soveel Drome, Stetson Music
- 1994: Laat My Weet, BMG
- 1995: Vat-Vat (certified platinum), BMG
- 1996: Vat-Vat Vol. 2: K-K-Kyk na my! (certified gold), BMG
- 1997: Vat-Vat Vol. 3: My Deure Staan Oop (certified gold), BMG
- 1997: Ek Hoor As U Roep (certified gold), BMG
- 1998: Vat-Vat 4: Dans, Dans Met My!, BMG
- 1998: Hoe Sê Mens Dankie: Treffers op Video (sell-thru video), BMG
- 1998: Duet met Patricia Lewis (certified platinum), BMG
- 1999: Neem My T'rug' (compilation album)
- 1999: Die Hart Van ´n Wenner, BMG
- 2000: Verbly jou in die Here, BMG
- 2000: Sewe Reënboë, Stetson Music
- 2001: Goud (certified gold, BMG
- 2001: Sonvanger, Stetson Music
- 2002: Goud 2, BMG
- 2003: Gospel 21 Treffers, BMG
- 2004: 10 Uit 10, Hoezit
- 2005: Jurie & Hestrie: Die Troue & 10 Musiekvideo's (DVD), Sony BMG
- 2004: Treffers, Sony BMG
- 2005: 18 Lekker Kinderliedjies (with Magda Greyling), Hoezit
- 2005: Honderd Bewonderd, Stetson Music
- 2006: Ek Bid, Sony BMG
- 2006: Is Jy Seker?, Maranatha
- 2007: Stille Rivierstroom: 16 Country Gunstelinge, Stetson Music
- 2007: Net Jy (compilation album), Stetson Music
- 2007: 'n Dans Met Pa: 25 Grootste Treffers (DVD), Sony
- 2007: Collections, Sony
- 2008: 40 Goue Treffers: Dankie Suid-Afrika, Stetson Music / SMD
- 2011: Voorbegin: Vat-Vat 5, Stetson Music / SMD
- 2011: SA Country Gold: The Very Best of Jurie Els (compilation album), EMI
- 2012: Vertrou Net en Glo: 21 Liedjies van Geloof, Hoop en Liefde, EMI
- 2013: Spring Bobbejaantjie: 23 Beste Kinderliedjies (with Magda Greyling), EMI
- 2014: Beach House in the Blue Mountains (duet album with Alan Garrity), Universal
- 2014: Super 12 Treffers, Next Music
- 2015: Stil Verby: 48 Hoogtepunte van 21 Jaar, Universal
- 2015: 20 Goue Treffers, Select / Sony
