= Pietro Neri-Baraldi =

Italian opera singer (1828–1902)

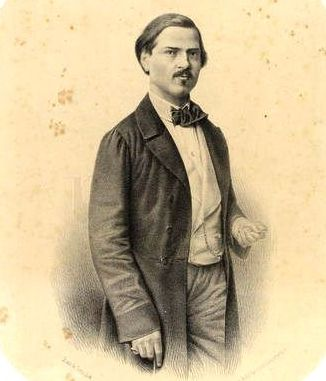
Neri-Baraldi c. 1860

Pietro Neri-Baraldi (1828 – 29 June 1902) was an Italian opera singer who sang leading tenor roles throughout Europe. He was born in Minerbio, a small town near Bologna and made his debut at the Teatro Comunale di Bologna in 1850. By 1853 he was engaged as the leading tenor at the Teatro del Corso where he sang in the first performances in Bologna of Il trovatore (as Manrico), Rigoletto (as the Duke of Mantua), and Elena da Feltre (as Ubaldo). He then appeared in Paris during the 1854/1855 season singing at both the Théâtre-Italien and the Paris Opéra. He sang a wide range of roles in London from 1856 to 1868, first at the Lyceum Theatre and then at the Royal Opera House. He also performed in Lisbon at the Teatro de São Carlos where he was the primo tenore assoluto from 1856 to 1867 and in St. Petersburg.

In 1863 Neri-Baraldi married the Austrian-born soprano Antonietta Fricci (1840–1912) and often appeared with her on stage. In his later years he taught singing. Amongst his pupils was the South African soprano, Ada Forrest. He died in Bologna.
