= Robbie Klay =

South African singer, songwriter and actor

- Born: 20 June 1986 (age 40); Pretoria
- Occupations: Songwriter, Television actor

Robbie Klay (born 20 June 1986) is a South African singer, songwriter, television and theatre stage actor. He sings in Afrikaans and English in the pop, rock and country genres.

== Career ==
Klay began singing at age 5 becoming a child performer. His debut album was released when he was just nine and was signed to BMG, later Sony BMG. He toured Cape Town, Durban, Johannesburg and Pretoria. He appeared at a number of notable art festivals including the Margate Music Festival in KwaZulu-Natal, and later as an adult performer at the Annual Afrikaans Music Festival. He has recorded eleven studio albums in South Africa. He has also acted in a number of films and stage productions.

Klay studied acting at the Pro Arte and Drama High School in Pretoria, South Africa. He continued his education and graduated from the Technikon Drama School in Pretoria. In 2007, he studied at the TVI Actors Studio in Los Angeles.

Klay is known for his role as Buks van Wyk (Amalia's son) in the South African TV series Amalia, for two seasons in 2005 and 2006. Amalia was last re-aired on local television in 2009. As a live stage performer, he appeared at the Aardklop National Arts Festival in October 2011 in the role of Colin Prop. He starred in the award-winning theatrical stage production of Vaselinetjie in 2012, produced and directed by Henry Mylne.

His album Ek is Hier/I am Here was a turning point writing 5 songs in the album, two in English and 3 in Afrikaans. Two singles were released from the album, "A Little Rock 'n Roll" and "Together". He has toured the United States including venues in Houston, Atlanta, New York, Charlotte, Orlando, Phoenix and California.

== In popular culture ==
In 2013, Klay was featured in a commercial playing a marine for Navy Federal Credit Union. He appeared as a boxer for DIRECTV's Bare Knuckle Boxing promotion

Klay appeared in Aloe Blacc's 2014 music video for "The Man".

== Personal life ==
Klay was involved in a high-profile court case after he alleged in 2008 of sexual molestation by the South African singer Jurie Els when Klay was between 11 and 16. The allegations first appeared in Beeld in February 2008. The court trying the case found the evidence insufficient and dismissed the case in 2009 acquitting Els. The Pretoria High Court upheld the decision and ruled in Els' favour acquitting him on all charges of sexual molestation. The court also ordered a ban on publication of further details of the alleged case. Major media outlets Huisgenoot, You and Media24 defying the court's publication ban were successfully sued by Els and eventually sanctioned and fined.

Klay became a father when he was just 16, when his daughter Jayhden was born out of wedlock. In 2011, DNA tests proved he was the biological father of a 16-year-old Pretoria girl's son, Calib, born in December 2010. Klay did not contest the results, saying he remained friends with the mother although they were not married.

== Discography ==
=== Albums ===
- 1997: Kan 'n man dan nie
- 1998: My Naam Is Robbie
- 1999: Tokolosh
- 2000: Ek hou van jou
- 2003: Ra Ta Ta (in English)
- 2003: Iko iko...net vir jou!
- 2003: Treffers 1997-2003 (compilation album)
- 2005: Nuwe Dag
- 2006: Hier by my
- 2007: Collections
- 2008: Ek is hier... (bilingual / English and Afrikaans)
- 2011: Amazing (English)

=== Singles ===
- "A Little Rock 'n Roll"
- "Together"

== Filmography ==
- 2005: Amalia as Buks van Wyk (South African TV series)
- 2015: Harper and Vlad as Investigator Harper

== Theatre ==
- 2011: Aardklop
- 2012: Vaselinetjie
