= Antonietta Fricci =

Austrian opera singer

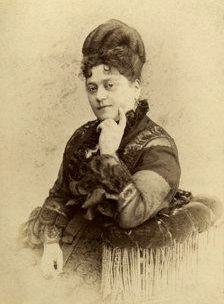
Fricci photographed in Trieste c. 1870

Antonietta Fricci (born Antonie Frietsche) (8 January 1840 – 7 September 1912) was an Austrian-born opera singer known for her performances in leading soprano and mezzo-soprano roles in the opera houses of Europe. She was married to the Italian tenor Pietro Neri-Baraldi from 1863 until his death in 1902.

== Roles created ==
- Lidia in Pacini's Lidia di Bruxelles (Teatro Comunale, Bologna, 21 October 1858)
- Isabella in Pedrotti's Isabella d'Aragona (Teatro Vittorio Emanuele, Turin, 7 February 1859)
- Aldona in Ponchielli's I Lituani (La Scala, Milan, 7 March 1874)
- Mirza in Coronaro's La creola (Teatro Comunale, Bologna, 24 November 1878)
