= Richard and Cherry Kearton =

English naturalists and wildlife photographers

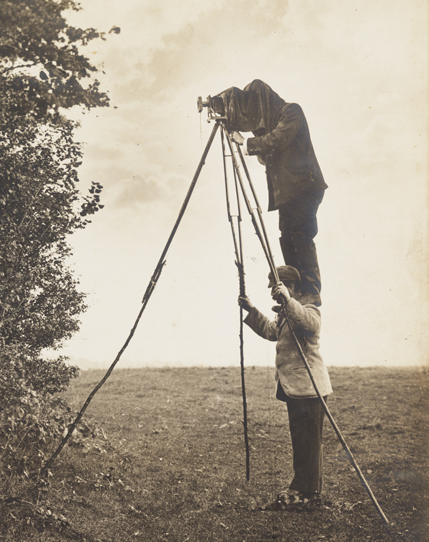
The Keartons photographing a bird's nest, 1890s. Cherry is on Richard's shoulders.

Richard Kearton FZS, FRPS (2 January 1862 – 8 February 1928) and Cherry Kearton (8 July 1871 – 27 September 1940), brothers, were a pair of British naturalists and some of the world's earliest wildlife photographers. They developed innovative methods to photograph animals in the wild and, in 1895, published the first natural history book to be entirely illustrated by wild photographs. Richard was made a Fellow of the Zoological Society of London and Royal Photographic Society. Cherry later became a wildlife and news filmmaker, and friend to Theodore Roosevelt. The Royal Geographical Society created the Cherry Kearton Medal and Award in his honour. David Attenborough credits Kearton's films for inspiring him as a child to "dream of travelling to far-off places to film wild animals."

== Biographies ==
Richard and Cherry were born in the village of Thwaite, North Riding of Yorkshire, England, the second and fourth sons of parents Mary and John Kearton. Their father was a yeoman farmer. The brothers were educated in Muker and Richard was a farmer in Swaledale, Yorkshire, until 1882, then manager of a publicity department at the publishing house Cassell & Co. until 1898. He married Ellen Rose Cowdrey in 1889 and had three sons and two daughters.

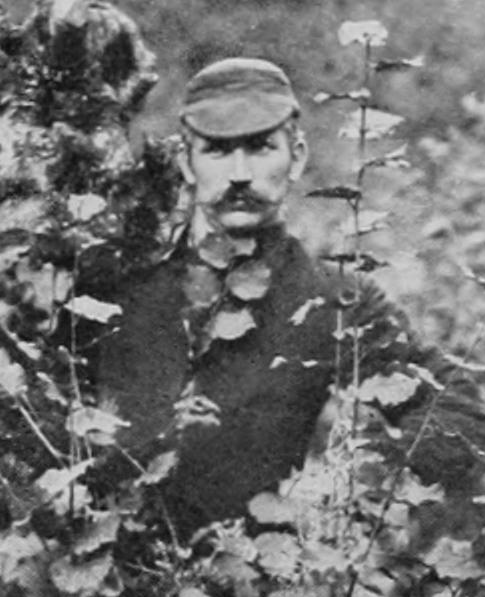
Richard Kearton, the "Machiavelli of bird photography."

Cherry married Mary Burwood Coates in 1900, with whom he had a son, named Edward Cherry, and a daughter, Mary Nina, known as Nina. They divorced in 1920, and he married Ada Forrest, a South African soprano, in 1923. He died in 1940. The Royal Geographical Society's Cherry Kearton Medal and Award was created in his honour.

== Photography ==
Cherry Kearton specialised in animal photography, having taken the first ever photograph of a bird's nest with eggs in 1892. In the summer of 1896 he and his brother, a naturalist, reached the Outer Hebridean islands of St Kilda and many other remote places. In 1898 their famous book, With Nature and a Camera, illustrated by 160 photographs, was published in London by Cassell. Cherry Kearton contributed photographs to seventeen of Richard Kearton's books, and wrote and illustrated a further seventeen titles of his own. He made the first phonograph recording of birds (a nightingale and a song thrush) singing in the wild in 1900; took the first film of London from the air in 1908, and the first footage of hostilities in the First World War at Antwerp in 1914. Cherry and Richard Kearton are perhaps best remembered for the development of naturalistic photographic hides, including the hollow ox of 1900 and the stuffed sheep of 1901.

== Films ==
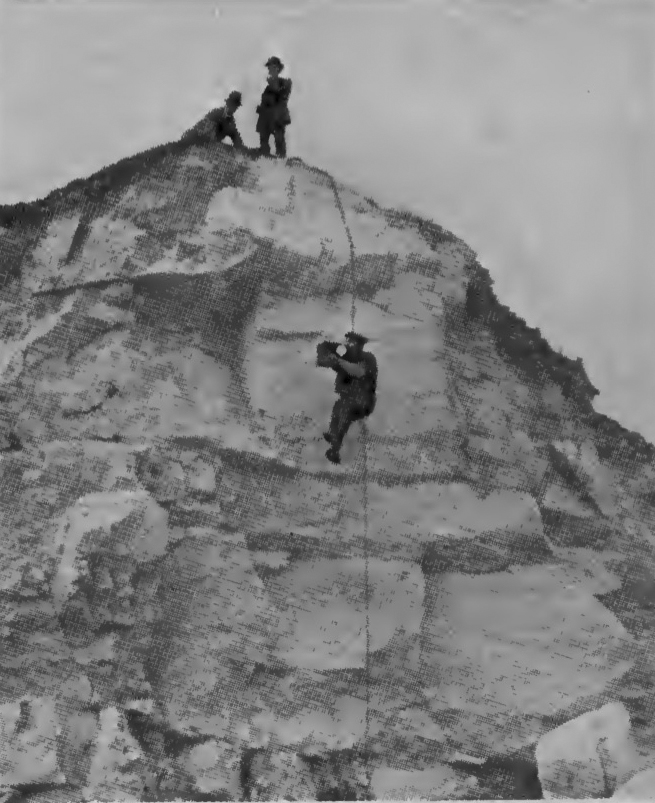
Cherry Kearton filming with aeroscope

Cherry and Richard Kearton shot a number of shorts of birds and animals for Charles Urban in the years 1905–1908. From 1909, Cherry moved into the field of wildlife documentary film making, shot on visits to Africa, India, Borneo, the US, Canada, Australia and New Zealand. He directed more than thirty films for his film companies Cherry Kearton Ltd and Cherry Kearton Films Ltd., including the following:

- A Primitive Man's Career to Civilization (1911)
- Roosevelt in Africa (1910)
- Lassoing Wild Animals in Africa (1910)
- Wild Life Across the World (1923)
- With Cherry Kearton in the Jungle (1927)
- Dassan: An adventure in search of laughter, featuring nature's greatest little comedians (1930)
- The Big Game of Life (1935)

In the beginning, Kearton used a clumsy Kinemascope film camera on tripod, but around 1911 he switched to Aeroscope camera, which led to superior results; for this light, one-hand-operated equipment was better suited to wildlife cinematography.

== Books ==
- Kearton, Richard; Kearton, Cherry (1898) With nature and a camera; being the adventures and observations of a field naturalist and an animal photographer, Cassell.
- Kearton, Richard. 1898. Wild Life at Home How to Study and Photograph it. Cassell, London
- Kearton, Richard. 1901. Strange Adventures in Dicky-Bird Land, Cassell, London
- Kearton, Richard. 1907. The Fairyland of Living Things. Cassell, London
- Kearton, Richard. 1911. The adventures of jack Rabbit. Cassell, London
- Kearton, Richard. 1912. Baby birds at home. Cassell, London
- Crane, Walter; Kearton, Richard; Kearton, Cherry; English, Douglas; Ward, John J.; Lockyer, J.S.; Irving, Henry; Fitzgerald, H. Purefoy. 1912. The Nature Book – A Popular Description by Pen and Camera of the Delights and Beauties of the Open Air. Profusely illustrated with Photographs and numerous coloured plates by famous artists. Cassell and Company, London.
- Kearton, Richard. 1913. Our bird friends. Cassell, London
- Kearton, Cherry. 1913. Photographing Wild Life Across The World. J. W. Arrowsmith Ltd.
- Kearton, Cherry and James Barnes. 1915. Through Central Africa from East to West. London: Cassell and Company.
- Kearton, Richard. 1922. Wild Nature's Ways Cassell and Company, Limited, London
- Kearton, Richard. 1926. A Naturalist's Pilgrimage
- Kearton, Cherry. 1926. My friend Toto. Arrowsmith, London
- Kearton, Cherry. 1926. My dog Simba. Arrowsmith, London
- Kearton, Cherry. 1929. My animal friendships;: The adventures of Timmy the rat, Chuey the cheetah, Robin Parker the mongoose, Mr. Penguin, Jane the elephant, and Mrs. Spider. Dodd, Mead and Company.
- Kearton, Cherry. 1929. In the land of the lion. NY: National Travel Book Club.
- Kearton, Cherry. 1931. The island of Penguins. Robert M. McBride & Co., New York: 1931.
- Kearton, Cherry. 1932. The animals came to drink. Longmans, Green & Co.
- Kearton, Cherry. 1934. The Lion's Roar. Longmans, London.

== Sources ==
- Kearton's Wildlife, part of the series Nation on Film BBC Two, 26 February 2007
- Bevis, John (2007). Direct From Nature: The Photographic Work of Richard & Cherry Kearton. Colin Sackett. ISBN 978-0953704866.
- Mitchell, W. R. (2001). Watch the Birdie: The Life and Times of Richard and Cherry Kearton, Pioneers of Nature Photography. Settle: Castleberg. ISBN 1871064341.
