= Etienne Steyn =

South African singer and songwriter (born 1978)

- Born: Etienne Benjamin Steyn; 24 November 1978 (age 47)
- Origin: Germiston, Gauteng, South Africa
- Genres: Rock; Pop; Folk
- Occupations: Singer, songwriter
- Instrument: Vocals
- Label: AKA Records

Etienne Steyn is a South African singer and songwriter who mostly sings in Afrikaans. He spent a large amount of his life growing up in George in the Western Cape province of South Africa. In 2005, Steyn recorded his debut album "Storie van my Hart".

== Early career ==
Etienne's music career started off when his father gave him an old guitar while he was in grade 8. Etienne never stopped making music after this. He formed his first "Hard Metal Rock" group Denizen, in 1995 and participated that year in "Battle of the Bands" in Stellenbosch, and also at Woodstock in Oudtshoorn. Etienne writes his own songs, and has since the beginning.

The very successful rock group Goose Gap was founded in 2000. Etienne's peak with this group was their popular song Sugar Up My Lollipop, which became a hit in South Africa. During this time he also played with groups such as Not My Dog, Wonderboom, Springbok Nude Girls and Prime Circle. In February and March 2004, Etienne was the lead singer for the band Cutting Jade when they went on a nationwide tour, because their previous singer had left the group.

In December 2001 Etienne moved to Pretoria, and pursued music as his full-time career, and in January 2002 he worked for a year at David Gresham Records.

== Discography ==
- Storie van my Hart (2005)
- Bietjie van My (2007)
- My Sonskyn (2010)

== See also ==
- List of Afrikaans singers
- List of South African musicians
- Music of South Africa

== Sources ==
- https://web.archive.org/web/20100630180914/http://www.stagedream.co.za/Artists/Etienne-Steyn Retrieved 26 April 2010
- https://web.archive.org/web/20090804013434/http://www.huisgenoottempo.com/kunstenaars/bio/etienne-steyn Retrieved 26 April 2010
- https://web.archive.org/web/20100427105653/http://www.take2.co.za/music-etienne-steyn-my-sonskyn-cd-6289727.html Retrieved 26 April 2010
- https://web.archive.org/web/20110724145752/http://www.take2.co.za/music-etienne-steyn-bietjie-van-my-cd-2432566.html Retrieved 26 April 2010
