= A Primitive Man's Career to Civilization =

- Directed by: Cherry Kearton
- Written by: Cherry Kearton
- Distributed by: WTC
- Release date: 1912
- Country: United Kingdom
- Languages: silent film English intertitles

A Primitive Man's Career to Civilization was a UK film released in 1912, directed and written by Cherry Kearton. Shot on 35mm film in silent black and white, it was distributed by WTC.

The film was produced in 1911 by the Ethnographic Society of London, who had previously commissioned Kearton to film a traditional Kenyan dance performed to honour Theodore Roosevelt when he visited the country in 1909.
