= Liza Brönner =

South African singer-songwriter

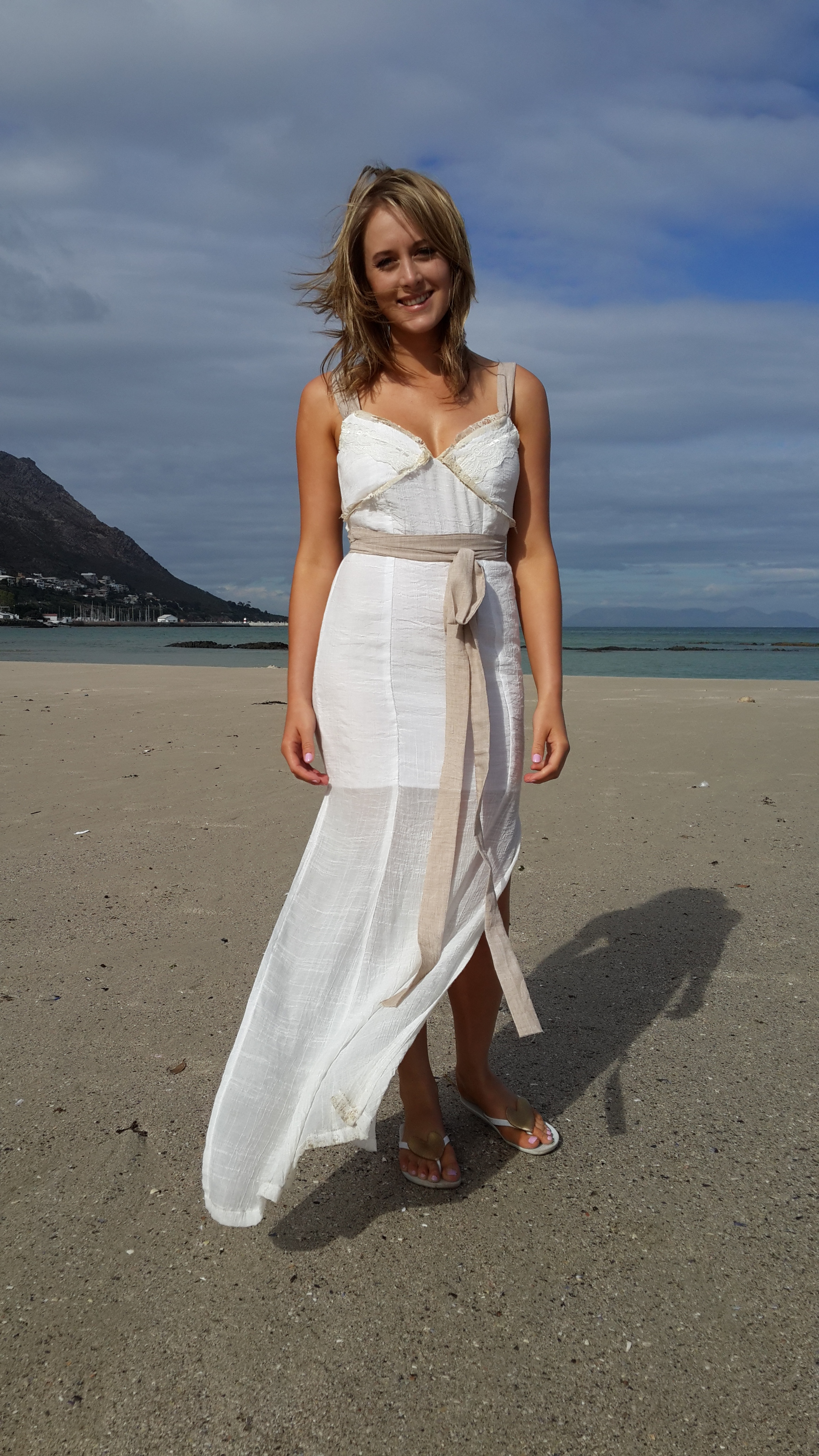
- Photo on Set (Gordon's Bay)

Background information
- Born: 11 December 1989 (age 36)
- Origin: South Africa
- Genres: Pop-country (Afrikaans • English)
- Occupations: Singer; Songwriter; Stage actress
- Instruments: Vocals, Guitar
- Years active: 2009–present
- Labels: EMI 2009-2011; Hit Records 2011-2013; 2Brothers Entertainment (Pty) Ltd 2013 – present
- Website: www.lizabronner.co.za

Liza Brönner (born 11 December 1989) is a South African singer and songwriter. Her music is performed in both Afrikaans and English. Brönner is also a stage actress. Her debut album, Onderstebo was released on 21 September 2009 by EMI. This album has been repacked on 29 March 2010 with four new songs as Asemloos and also released by EMI. Her third album, Vir eers is dit net ek... was released on 1 September 2011 by HIT Records.

In May 2013, Liza won the reality program searching for a replacement actor for the stage production (musical) Liefling. She played the lead role across from Bobby van Jaarsveld playing Jan in the musical.

In the same year, she released a new CD with 2Brothers Entertainment, entitled "Jy het my gevind". She felt that the title of her album expressed her experience of a new era in her career.

In December 2014, the "Liefling" theatre production was staged at the Teatro, Montecasino, becoming the first "Afrikaans" musical playing at the Teatro. Liza is playing the role of "Liefling" again opposite Bobby van Jaarsveld.

== Married to ==
- Ricus Nel.
- 26 Januarie 2013

== Discography ==
- Onderstebo, 2009
- Asemloos, 2010
- Vir eers is dit net ek, 2011
- Jy het my gevind, 2013
- New Single "Sit jou hand op jou mond", 2014

== Music video list ==
- Jy het my gevind
- Asem jou in
- Waar jou soene hoort
- Hier by my
- Clout - Substitute (Duet with Cindy Alter)
- Alles in 'n hartklop
- Sonder jou with Louis Fivas

== Philanthropy ==
Liza has been involved with the Hanna Charity and Empowerment Foundation, whose mission is to take hands with the poor and marginalized people of South Africa.

- Hanna Charity saam met Liza Bronner by Margaretha Ackerman Ouetehuis
- Hanna Charity en Liza Bronner sing Blinkvosperd by Margaretha Ackerman Ouetehuis

== Media ==
- "Liefling Liza loop oor van vreugde" by Beeld (Lourensa Eckard) Digital on 4 June 2013
- "Hoekom jy Liefling móét gaan kyk" by Huisgenoot (Wicus Pretorius) Digital on 7 June 2013
- "Jy is my liefling" - Reality show on Kyknet
- "Album van die week: Jy het my gevind deur Liza Brönner" by Huisgenoot (Naudé van der Merwe) Digital on 14 October 2013
- "Kersfees Skouspel terug" by Carnival City (Lefra Productions) 11/29/2013
- "Liza Interview" with NET NEWS (Ken Belter)
- "Hier by my CD Launch" by Kyknet (Bravo)
- "Hier by my CD Launch" by (Jacatainment TV)
- For a complete list of released products see VETSEUN Website

"Liefling" Teatro Montecasino

- "LIEFLING" in theatre @ the Teatro Montecasino
- "Liefling die Musiekblyspel in die Teatro, Montecasino"
- "Liefling die Musiekblyspel in die Teatro, Montecasino"
- "Liefling die Musiekblyspel" by Vrouekeur
- "Liefling is ‘n treffer!" by Kyknet (Sune Lotter)
- "Liefling" by BLCK TV
- Review: Liefling by B Sharp Entertainment (Chris Avant-Smith)

== See also ==
- List of Afrikaans singers
