= Ada Cherry Kearton =

South African singer

- Autographed portrait of Kearton, c. 1910
- Born: Ada Forrest; 17 July 1877; Congella, Colony of Natal
- Died: 19 January 1966 (aged 88); London, UK
- Education: Royal Academy of Music
- Occupations: Oratorio and concert singer
- Spouses: (i) Allen Hawes (ii)Cherry Kearton

Ada Cherry Kearton (born Ada Forrest; 17 July 1877 – 19 January 1966) was a South African classical soprano who sang in concert and oratorio. She made her London debut in 1907 and retired from the stage shortly before her marriage in 1922 to the English wildlife photographer Cherry Kearton. Her 1956 autobiography On Safari recounts their travels together in Africa, Australia and New Zealand.

== Life and career ==
Kearton was born in Congella, a settlement near Durban in the Colony of Natal. She received her first instruction in singing at her convent school in Durban and made her first public appearance at the South African Eisteddfod in Durban when she was 14. She went on to study at the Royal Academy of Music in London and subsequently studied under Charles Santley, Pietro Neri-Baraldi, and Henry Wood. A soprano, she made her London debut on 24 May 1907, at the Empire Day Concert in Queen's Hall. England was to become her home, although she returned to South Africa several times to perform, including a concert tour in 1909.

She appeared numerous times in the Henry Wood Promenade Concerts between 1909 and 1915. During the course of her career she appeared in many other concerts and recitals in England and Scotland, including a solo recital at London's Wigmore Hall in November 1918, where she sang 17th-century songs by William Lawes and Thomas Morley and modern settings of Tennyson's poems. The Wigmore performance did not impress Ezra Pound who wrote a scathing review for The New Age: "As Morley and Lawes scarcely preserved a trace of their beauties in the path of her assault, I fled before she began singing modern settings of Tennyson."

She made a last recital tour to South Africa in 1921 before retiring from the concert stage. She changed her name from Ada Forrest to Ada Cherry Kearton in 1922, upon marrying the wildlife photographer Cherry Kearton (his second marriage) and then "devoted her life to her husband and his work". The couple had a pet chimpanzee named Mary who lived with them for six years as "one of the Kearton family". The Keartons were said to have taught Mary to write her name and play three musical instruments. According to the Brisbane Courier-Mail, the chimpanzee would sit and sew with Ada for an hour at a time and accompanied the couple on many of their travels. Between 1934 and 1940 they lived at 'The Jungle' Firs Road, Kenley Croydon. The house was destroyed by bombing and the area is now known as Kearton Close. Ada Kearton's autobiography On Safari, an account of her travels through Africa, Australia and New Zealand with her husband, was published in 1956. On 8 October of that year she appeared as a "castaway" on the BBC Radio programme Desert Island Discs.

Cherry Kearton died in 1940. Ada died in London in 1966 at the age of 88.

== Bibliography ==
- —— (1941). Under African Skies. Robert Hale and Company.
- —— (1956). On Safari. Robert Hale.

== Recordings ==
According to the Standard Encyclopaedia of Southern Africa, Ada Kearton and Annie Visser were the first major South African singers whose recordings included works in Afrikaans. Both of their recordings were made in London in 1908. Kearton's other recordings were:

- Henry Purcell's "Nymphs and Shepherds" for the His Master's Voice.
- Frances Allitsen's "There's a Land" and Amelia Lehmann's "When love is kind" (double-sided disc) for Pathé Records.

== See also ==
- List of Afrikaans singers
