= Die Grafsteensangers =

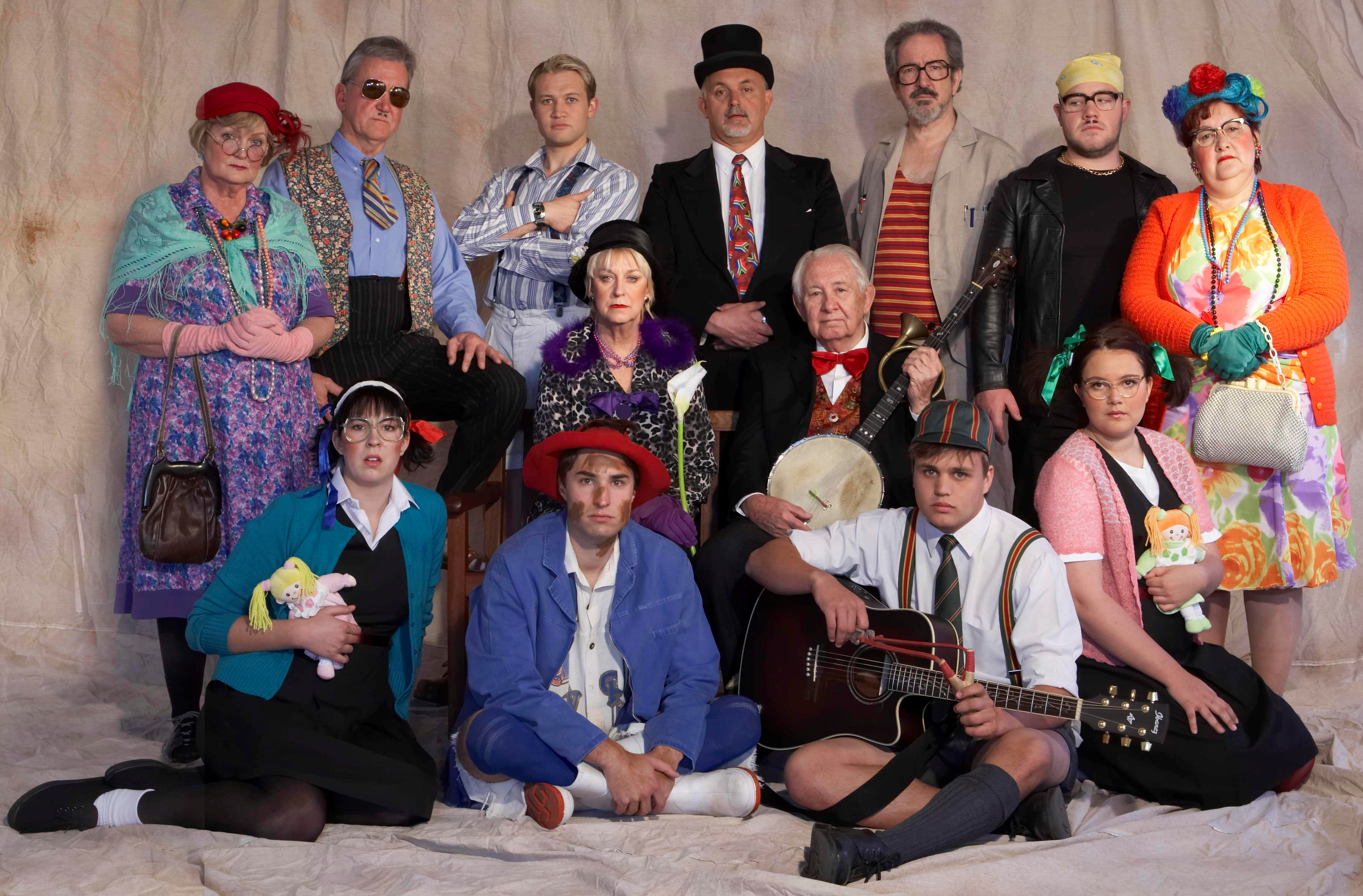
"Die Grafsteensangers" in 2007

Die Grafsteensangers (the Tomb Stone Singers) is a comical entertainment group in South Africa. The 12 members of the group, with ages varying between 18 and 83, sing mostly old Afrikaans songs with straight faces and in old costumes.

They have produced five CDs, one video and one DVD, and have performed at all the major Afrikaans arts festivals: Klein Karoo Nasionale Kunstefees (KKNK), Aardklop, Innibos, Volksbladfees, Suidoosterfees and UKkasie - a former Afrikaans art festival in London.
