= Leonie Bronkalla =

German politician (born 1996)

Member of the Landtag of Saxony-Anhalt
- Incumbent
- Assumed office 6 October 2026

Personal details
- Born: 1996 (age 29–30)
- Party: Alliance 90/The Greens (since 2020)

Leonie Bronkalla (born 1996) is a German politician who was elected member of the Landtag of Saxony-Anhalt in 2026. She has served as co-chair of Alliance 90/The Greens in Dessau-Roßlau since 2024.
