= Patricia Lewis (singer) =

South African actress

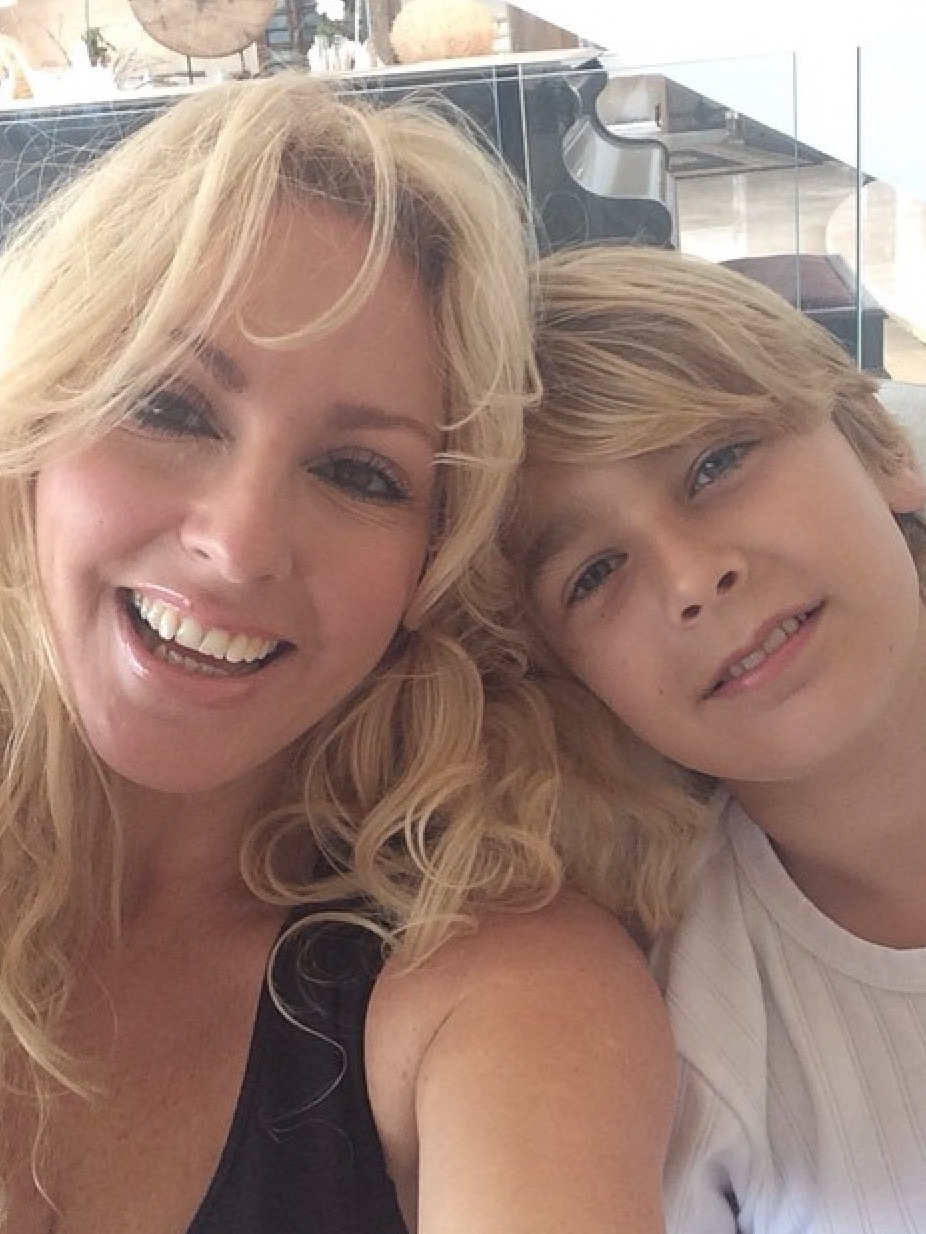
- Lewis with her son

Background information
- Born: 22 September 1967 (age 59); Transvaal (now Gauteng), South Africa
- Genres: Afrikaans, Pop
- Occupations: Singer; actress; television personality
- Years active: 1990-2009; 2015–present
- Labels: BMG, VAT VYF, Sony Music

Patricia Lewis (born 22 September 1967) is a South African singer, actress and television presenter.

== Career ==
=== Music ===
Lewis's debut album, Don't Tempt Me was released in 1992. "Ek Is Lief Vir Jou" which was released in 1997, achieved sales of 125,000. Patricia was rewarded the 1st Artist in the history of South African music that could achieve the number of sales. "Wie Sou Jou Kon Liefhê Soos Ek" reached gold status on the day it was released in 1997. Lewis has performed over 2500 shows in various countries and recorded duets with numerous local and international celebrities, including David Hasselhoff, Bles Bridges and Jim Reeves. To date, her albums have reached over 1,000,000 in total sales. In September 2021 Patrica released her 1st "comeback" single in 11 years called Hello Hello, Ek Het Jou Gemis, which reached the number one position on numerous radio stations in South Africa and Namibia.

=== Film and television ===
After a successful career in modelling, having won 13 beauty competitions, Lewis went on to star in numerous television shows, as well as an international film with Oliver Reed. She has produced and presented numerous television programmes, such as the SABC 2 reality series Blonde Ambisie and the Toyota Top 20. Lewis is the creator of the highly successful reality singing competition Supersterre, the third season of which aired in 2010 with a viewership of more than two and a half million people. She retired from public life when her only child, Max, started school. After four years, Lewis returned to television as a contestant on the celebrity edition of MasterChef South Africa where she finished in second position in early 2015. She was also a contestant on the third season of Strictly Come Dancing in 2007. Patricia was a guest on the 5th season of KykNET's Republiek van Zoid Afrika. The episode she appeared in had the highest viewership of all five seasons of the show.

== Personal life ==
Lewis was born in Transvaal, where she matriculated from Mondeor High School in 1985, an English-speaking high school located in the southern suburbs of Johannesburg. Known primary schools she attended were Aloe Ridge Primary and Mondeor Primary School. She is a former provincial gymnast, having won multiple medals, including gold, on a national level. Her mother, Linda Lewis, was a Johannesburg city councillor for the Democratic Alliance for many years. In May 2003, Lewis married Mark Whitfield, with whom she has a son, Max. Patricia and her family gave up the busy city life for a more relaxed life in 2010. She relocated from Gauteng to Zimbali in Ballito. In 2020, Patricia decided to release new songs to honour her mother and father, Linda and Patrick Lewis. However, Patricia lost her mother to Alzheimer's in 2021.

After the success of her new hit song Hello Hello and due to overwhelming popular demand, Patricia has decided that she will embark on a nationwide tour once her next album is complete.

== Discography ==
- Hello Hello, Ek het jou gemis (Single), 2021 Patricia Lewis Music
- First time I ever saw your face (Duet with Karen Zoid)(Single), 2018 Brainwave Productions
- 20 Goue treffers, 2014: Select Musiek/Sony Music Entertainment Africa
- Net Soos In Drome (Re-Issue) (includes duet with David Hasselhoff ), 2008 Vat 5 Musiek/Sony BMG Music Entertainment Africa
- Net Soos In Drome, 2008 Vat 5 Musiek/Sony BMG Music Entertainment Africa
- 10 Goue Jare: Die Grootste Treffers, 2006 Vat 5 Musiek/Sony BMG Music Entertainment Africa
- The DVD: 21 Grootste Treffers, 2004 Vat 5 Musiek/Sony BMG Music Entertainment Africa
- Special double CD 1: Sings Olivia Newton-John / CD 2: n Nuwe Lewe CD, 2004 Vat 5 Musiek/Sony BMG Entertainment Africa
- ´n Nuwe Lewe 2003 Vat 5 Musiek/BMG Africa
- Sings Olivia Newton-John (includes duet with Kurt Darren), 2002 Vat 5 Musiek/BMG Africa
- Vir Ewig En Altyd (spesiale uitgawe), Vat 5 Musiek/BMG Africa
- Vir Ewig En Altyd, 2000 Vat 5 Musiek/BMG Africa
- Jy's Die Een, 1999 Vat 5 Musiek/BMG Africa
- Duet, with Jurie Els, 1998 Vat 5 Musiek/BMG Africa
- Wie Sou Jou Kon Liefhê Soos Ek?, 1998 Vat 5 Musiek/BMG Africa
- Ek Is Lief Vir Jou, 1998 BSP/Vat 5 Musiek/BMG Africa
- Don't Tempt Me, 1992 GALLO
- Come on and shout (Debut Single), 1990 GALLO
