= Rooibaardt =

Band

Rooibaardt was a South African band formed in May 2004 with Hensi Van Staden, Denzl Keenan, Louis Esterhuizen and André du Plessis. They played their first gig in June 2004 at Konkakol Bloemfontein Arts festival.

They all lived in Bethlehem in the Free State province of South Africa The name of the band came to them in their "pirate ship", a Volkswagen Combi, on the way to the first gig. Redbeard was a great pirate of times gone bye.

== Biography ==
Previously Hensi Van Staden and Denzl Keenan had a project called Fumadores (1999) which took them all over South Africa, gipsy style, performing and selling their music. In 2000, while Van Staden and Du Plessis went traveling abroad, Keenan met Louis Esterhuizen and together they were involved in projects like Baraka, Spin Nasi and Shamanzi. Mario van Vuuren – pub owner and music lover from Bethlehem promoted their music.

Returning from their travels, André du Pessis became a school teacher outside Bethlehem, playing drums for local bands in his spare time. Van Staden passed through town one day, met his old friends and started jamming in the Game Cock Inn. Since then they have been on the road mostly using Bethlehem as their base.

In May 2006 another local talent, OB (Louis-II) Swart (previously from the Pretoria band Mrs B) joined the group on base and Esterhuizen moved to electric guitar.

But in January 2007, after losing their equipment and van they scaled down playing mostly in the small town Clarens. Esterhuizen relocated to Western Cape. Hensi and Denzl went on playing under the name Rooibaardt Light/Fumadores and OB and Andre together with Riaan de Jager (Pirhanna) formed the group BenDover. From August 2010 Rooibaardt started gigging again and was active at least until 2013.

== Style ==
Rooibaardt uses a wide variety of sounds and instruments: classical, electric and bass guitars, violin, colongo, mbira, pan pipes, pennywhistle, harmonica, concertina, melodium, trumpet, keyboard, jaw harp, didgeridoo, saw, samplers, djembe and clay pots. Their style is therefore hard to define, but has been described as Afro world trans, Boere reggae and Gipsy cowboy rock.

Their message – often serious, sometimes political, sometimes satirical in English, Afrikaans, Sotho and Zulu. Rooibaardt was one of few touring bands in South Africa and spends most time on the road, pirate style. Increase da Peace, Rooibaardt's debut album was recorded and engineered by the band themselves in their makeshift studio build from hay bales. The first album was released in May 2005. The second album "More Fire, Less Bullets" was released in 2013.
