= Gé Korsten =

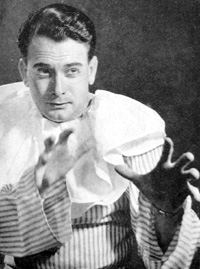
- Gé Korsten in his debut role as Canio in Ruggero Leoncavallo's Pagliacci.

Background information
- Born: Gérard Korsten; December 6, 1927; Schiedam, Netherlands
- Died: September 29, 1999 (aged 71) Wilderness, South Africa

Gérard Korsten (popularly known as Gé) (6 December 1927 - 29 September 1999) was a South African opera tenor and actor who had a great influence on Afrikaans culture.

Born in Schiedam, as the youngest of eight children, Korsten and his family emigrated to South Africa when he was nine years old. He married Elna Burger and had five children, among them renowned conductor and violinist Gérard Korsten.

== Career ==
Initially he worked as an electrician, but from the age of 20, started singing in choirs. However, he received his first formal vocal training in 1952, when he was well into his 20s, studying under Adelheid Armhold at the South African College of Music.

In 1955 he moved to Pretoria, where he was one of the founder members of the Pretoria opera company. In 1956, he debuted as Canio in Ruggero Leoncavallo's Pagliacci.

Korsten won a bursary to study in Vienna in 1962, where he received tuition under Judith Hellwig. During this period he had the opportunity to perform in Vienna and Munich, but he never sang professionally outside South Africa, mainly due to family considerations. It was only in 1970 that Korsten sold his business to devote himself to full-time singing. In the course of his operatic career, Korsten appeared on stage more than 3,000 times, playing 23 roles in most of the major operas.

In 1965, Korsten started his career in light music, with his album Gé Korsten Sing Uit Die Hart (English: Gé Korsten Sings From The Heart), and soon became a best-selling recording artist, with a career spanning 40 years. Nine of his 58 albums achieved gold status. Most of his recorded work is light Afrikaans music, including the song "Liefling" (English: Sweetheart). His popularity as a singer also led to lead roles in films such as Hoor My Lied (English: Hear My Song), Lied In My Hart (English: Song In My Heart) and A New Life, all of which included singing scenes. He received six Sarie awards and, in 1979, an ARTES award for his TV program Gé Sing (English: Gé Sings).

In his later life, Korsten was well known for his role as family patriarch Walt Vorster in the long-running South African soap opera Egoli: Place of Gold.

In 1985, he was appointed the managing director of the Cape Performing Arts Board (CAPAB) in Cape Town, a post which he held until 1989.

== Death ==
In 1999, he committed suicide with a self inflicted gunshot to his right temple, with the motive possibly being that he suffered from cancer.
